= Vice Chairperson of the Standing Committee of the National People's Congress =

- 全国人民代表大会常务委员会副委员长
- National Emblem of China

- Flag of China
- Standing Committee of the National People's Congress
- Status: Deputy national-level official
- Member of: Council of Chairpersons
- Nominator: Presidium of the National People's Congress
- Appointer: Vote within the National People's Congress
- Term length: Five years, renewable once consecutively
- Constituting instrument: Constitution of China
- Formation: 27 September 1954; 72 years ago

Vice Chairperson of the Standing Committee of the National People's Congress
- Simplified Chinese: 全国人民代表大会常务委员会副委员长
- Traditional Chinese: 全國人民代表大會常務委員會副委員長
Transcriptions
Standard Mandarin
- Hanyu Pinyin: Quánguó Rénmín Dàibiǎo Dàhuì Chángwù Wěiyuánhuì Fùwěiyuánzhǎng

Officially abbreviated as
- Simplified Chinese: 全国人大常委会副委员长
- Traditional Chinese: 全國人大常委會副委員長
Transcriptions
Standard Mandarin
- Hanyu Pinyin: Quánguó Réndà Chángwěihuì Fùwěiyuánzhǎng

The vice chairpersons of the Standing Committee of the National People's Congress are deputies to the chairman of the Standing Committee of the National People's Congress, responsible for assisting the chairman in his work.

The vice chairpersons are formally nominated by the Presidium of the NPC during a session and approved by the delegations of the NPC, though in reality are chosen within the ruling Chinese Communist Party (CCP). The chairman, vice chairpersons and the secretary-general of the NPCSC collectively constitute the Council of Chairpersons. A vice chairperson may be delegated to exercise some of the chairman's powers by the chairman. In the case that the chairman becomes incapacitated, NPCSC temporarily elects one of the vice chairpersons until the chairman is able to resume their work or a new chairman is elected by the NPC. Since 1982, vice chairpersons are appointed for a term of five years, and cannot serve for more than two terms.

== List of vice chairpersons ==
=== Current ===
Name (birth) Ethnic name Chinese name	Portrait	Gender	Ethnicity	Party Post	Took office	Tenure	Congress Term(s)	Other post(s) hold meantime during the tenure
Li Hongzhong (born 1966) 李鸿忠		Male	Han	CCP	10 March 2023	3 years, 235 days	14th	
Wang Dongming (born 1956) 王东明		Male	Han	CCP	17 March 2018	8 years, 228 days	13th, 14th	Chairman, All-China Federation of Trade Unions (2018–)
Xiao Jie (born 1957) 肖捷		Male	Han	CCP	10 March 2023	3 years, 235 days	14th	
Zheng Jianbang (born 1957) 郑建邦		Male	Han	RCCK; Chairman; 2022–	10 March 2023	3 years, 235 days	14th	
Ding Zhongli (born 1957) 丁仲礼		Male	Han	CDL; Chairman; 2017–	17 March 2018	8 years, 228 days	13th, 14th	Vice President, Chinese Academy of Sciences; President, University of the Chinese Academy of Sciences
Hao Mingjin (born 1956) 郝明金		Male	Han	CNDCA; Chairman; 2017–	17 March 2018	8 years, 228 days	13th, 14th	
Cai Dafeng (born 1960) 蔡达峰		Male	Han	CAPD; Chairman; 2017–	17 March 2018	8 years, 228 days	13th, 14th	
He Wei (born 1955) 何维		Male	Han	CPWDP; Chairman; 2022–	10 March 2023	3 years, 235 days	14th	
Wu Weihua (born 1956) 武维华		Male	Han	JS; Chairman; 2017–	17 March 2018	8 years, 228 days	13th, 14th	
Tie Ning (born 1957) 铁凝		Female	Han	CCP	10 March 2023	3 years, 235 days	14th	
Peng Qinghua (born 1957) 彭清华		Male	Han	CCP	10 March 2023	3 years, 235 days	14th	
Zhang Qingwei (born 1961) 张庆伟		Male	Han	CCP	10 March 2023	3 years, 235 days	14th	
Losang Jamcan (born 1957) བློ་བཟང་རྒྱལ་མཚན 洛桑江村		Male	Tibetan	CCP	10 March 2023	3 years, 235 days	14th	
Shohrat Zakir (born 1953) شۆھرەت زاكىر 雪克来提·扎克尔		Male	Uyghur	CCP	10 March 2023	3 years, 235 days	14th	

=== Historical ===
Name (birth–death) Ethnic name Chinese name	Portrait	Gender	Ethnicity	Party Post	Took office	Left office	Tenure	Congress Term(s)	Other post(s) hold meantime during the tenure
Soong Ching-ling (1893–1981) 宋庆龄		Female	Han	RCCK	27 September 1954	28 April 1959	4 years, 213 days	1st	Vice Chairwoman, 2nd National Committee, CPPCC (1954–1959)
Soong Ching-ling (1893–1981) 宋庆龄		Female	Han	RCCK	17 January 1975	29 May 1981 (death)	6 years, 132 days	4th, 5th	Head of state, PRC, as Acting Chairwoman, 4th NPCSC (6 July 1976 – 5 March 1978, 1 year, 242 days); Honorary Chairwoman, PRC (since 16 May 1981)
Soong Ching-ling (1893–1981) 宋庆龄		Female	Han	CCP (since 15 May 1981)	17 January 1975	29 May 1981 (death)	6 years, 132 days	4th, 5th	Head of state, PRC, as Acting Chairwoman, 4th NPCSC (6 July 1976 – 5 March 1978, 1 year, 242 days); Honorary Chairwoman, PRC (since 16 May 1981)
Lin Boqu (1886–1960) 林伯渠		Male	Han	CCP; Politburo; 1945–1960	27 September 1954	29 May 1960 (death)	5 years, 245 days	1st, 2nd	
Li Jishen (1885–1959) 李济深		Male	Han	RCCK; Chairman; 1948–1959	27 September 1954	9 October 1959	5 years, 12 days	1st, 2nd	
Zhang Lan (1872–1955) 张澜		Male	Han	CDL; Chairman; 1941–1955	27 September 1954	9 February 1955	135 days	1st	
Luo Ronghuan (1902–1963) 罗荣桓		Male	Han	CCP	27 September 1954	16 December 1963	9 years, 80 days	1st, 2nd	
Shen Junru (1875–1963) 沈钧儒		Male	Han	CDL; Chairman; 1955–1963	27 September 1954	11 June 1963	8 years, 257 days	1st, 2nd	
Guo Moruo (1892–1978) 郭沫若		Male	Han	CCP	27 September 1954	12 June 1978	23 years, 258 days	1st, 2nd, 3rd, 4th, 5th	President, Chinese Academy of Sciences (1949–1978); President, China Federation of Literary and Art Circles (1949–1979)
Huang Yanpei (1878–1965) 黄炎培		Male	Han	CNDCA; Chairman; 1945–1965	27 September 1954	21 December 1965	8 years, 257 days	1st, 2nd, 3rd	
Huang Yanpei (1878–1965) 黄炎培		Male	Han	CDL; Co-Founder	27 September 1954	21 December 1965	8 years, 257 days	1st, 2nd, 3rd	
Peng Zhen (1902–1997) 彭真		Male	Han	CCP; Politburo; 1945–1966	27 September 1954	17 January 1975	20 years, 112 days	1st, 2nd, 3rd	Secretary-General, 1st & 2nd NPCSCs (1954–1965)
Peng Zhen (1902–1997) 彭真		Male	Han	CCP; Politburo; 1979–1987	1 July 1979	18 June 1983	3 years, 352 days	5th	
Li Weihan (1896–1984) 李维汉		Male	Han	CCP	27 September 1954	3 January 1965	10 years, 98 days	1st, 2nd	
Chen Shutong (1876–1966) 陈叔通		Male	Han	Non-partisan	27 September 1954	17 February 1966	11 years, 143 days	1st, 2nd, 3rd	
Tenzin Gyatso (born 1935) 达赖喇嘛·丹增嘉措		Male	Monguor	Non-partisan	27 September 1954	3 January 1965	10 years, 98 days	1st, 2nd	Dalai Lama; Chairman, Preparatory Committee for the Tibet Autonomous Region (1956–1959)
Saifuddin Azizi (1915–2003) سەيپىدىن ئەزىزى 赛福鼎·艾则孜		Male	Uyghur	CCP; Politburo (Alternate); 1973–1982	27 September 1954	27 March 1993	38 years, 181 days	1st, 2nd, 3rd, 4th, 5th, 6th, 7th	Chairman, CPPCC Xinjiang Committee; First Secretary, CCP Xinjiang Committee; Director, Xinjiang Revolutionary Committee
Cheng Qian (1882–1968) 程潜		Male	Han	RCCK; Vice-Chairman	11 February 1958	5 April 1968	10 years, 54 days	1st, 2nd, 3rd	Governor of Hunan (1952–1967)
Choekyi Gyaltsen, Panchen Erdeni (1938–1989) 班禅额尔德尼·却吉坚赞		Male	Tibetan	Non-partisan	27 September 1954	27 April 1959	4 years, 212 days	2nd	First Vice-Chairman and later Acting Chairman, Preparatory Committee for the Tibet Autonomous Region (1956–1964)
Choekyi Gyaltsen, Panchen Erdeni (1938–1989) 班禅额尔德尼·却吉坚赞		Male	Tibetan	Non-partisan	10 September 1980	28 January 1989	8 years, 140 days	5th, 6th, 7th	Honorary President, Buddhist Association of China
He Xiangning (1878–1972) 何香凝		Female	Han	RCCK; Chairwoman; 1960–1972	27 April 1959	1 September 1972	13 years, 127 days	2nd, 3rd	
Liu Bocheng (1892–1986) 刘伯承		Male	Han	CCP	27 April 1959	10 September 1980	21 years, 136 days	2nd, 3rd, 4th, 5th	
Lin Feng (1906–1977) 林枫		Male	Han	CCP	27 April 1959	17 January 1975	15 years, 265 days	2nd, 3rd, 4th	President, CCP Central Party School (1963–1966)
Li Jingquan (1908–1989) 李井泉		Male	Han	CCP	3 January 1965	1966	363 days	3rd	
Li Jingquan (1908–1989) 李井泉		Male	Han	CCP	17 January 1975	1982	6 years, 349 days	4th, 5th	
Kang Sheng (1898–1975) 康生		Male	Han	CCP; Vice-Chairman; 1973–1975	3 January 1965	16 December 1975	10 years, 10 days	3rd, 4th	
Li Xuefeng (1907–2003) 李雪峰		Male	Han	CCP	3 January 1965	17 January 1975	10 years, 14 days	3rd	
Xu Xiangqian (1901–1990) 徐向前		Male	Han	CCP	3 January 1965	5 March 1978	13 years, 61 days	3rd, 4th	
Liu Ningyi (1907–1994) 刘宁一		Male	Han	CCP	3 January 1965	17 January 1975	10 years, 14 days	3rd	Secretary-General, 3rd NPCSC (1965–1975)
Zhang Zhizhong (1890–1969) 张治中		Male	Han	RCCK; Vice-Chairman	3 January 1965	6 April 1969	4 years, 93 days	3rd	
Ngapoi Ngawang Jigme (1910–2009) ང་ཕོད་ངག་དབང་འཇིགས་མེད་ 阿沛·阿旺晋美		Male	Tibetan	Non-partisan	3 January 1965	27 March 1993	28 years, 83 days	3rd, 4th, 5th, 6th, 7th	
Zhou Jianren (1888–1984) 周建人		Male	Han	CAPD; Chairman; 1979–1984	3 January 1965	10 September 1980	15 years, 251 days	3rd, 4th, 5th	Governor of Zhejiang (1958–1966)
Zhou Jianren (1888–1984) 周建人		Male	Han	CCP	3 January 1965	10 September 1980	15 years, 251 days	3rd, 4th, 5th	Governor of Zhejiang (1958–1966)
Dong Biwu (1886–1975) 董必武		Male	Han	CCP	17 January 1975	2 April 1975 (death)	3 years, 40 days	4th	
Wu De (1913–1995) 吴德		Male	Han	CCP	17 January 1975	16 April 1980	5 years, 90 days	4th, 5th	
Wei Guoqing (1913–1989) 韦国清		Male	Zhuang	CCP	17 January 1975	14 June 1989 (death)	18 years, 57 days	4th, 5th, 6th, 7th	
Nie Rongzhen (1899–1992) 聂荣臻		Male	Han	CCP	17 January 1975	10 September 1980	5 years, 237 days	4th, 5th	
Chen Yun (1908–1983) 陈云		Male	Han	CCP	17 January 1975	18 June 1983	8 years, 152 days	4th, 5th	
Tan Zhenlin (1902–1983) 谭震林		Male	Han	CCP	17 January 1975	18 June 1983	8 years, 152 days	4th, 5th	
Zhang Dingcheng (1889–1981) 张鼎丞		Male	Han	CCP	17 January 1975	10 September 1980	5 years, 237 days	4th, 5th	
Cai Chang (1900–1990) 蔡畅		Female	Han	CCP	17 January 1975	10 September 1980	5 years, 237 days	4th, 5th	
Ulanhu (1906–1988) ᠤᠯᠠᠭᠠᠨᠬᠦᠦ 乌兰夫		Male	Mongol	CCP; Politburo; 1977–1985	17 January 1975	18 June 1983	8 years, 152 days	4th, 5th	
Ulanhu (1906–1988) ᠤᠯᠠᠭᠠᠨᠬᠦᠦ 乌兰夫		Male	Mongol	CCP	8 April 1988	8 December 1988 (death)	244 days	7th	
Xu Deheng (1890–1990) 许德珩		Male	Han	JS; Chairman; 1946–1987	17 January 1975	8 April 1988	13 years, 82 days	4th, 5th, 6th	
Hu Juewen (1895–1989) 胡厥文		Male	Han	CNDCA; Chairman; 1979–1987	17 January 1975	8 April 1988	13 years, 82 days	4th, 5th, 6th	
Li Suwen (1933–2022) 李素文		Female	Han	CCP	17 January 1975	5 March 1978	3 years, 47 days	4th	
Yao Lianwei (1935–2012) 姚连蔚		Male	Han	CCP	17 January 1975	5 March 1978	3 years, 47 days	4th	
Deng Yingchao (1904–1992) 邓颖超		Female	Han	CCP	2 December 1976	18 June 1983	8 years, 152 days	4th, 5th	
Liao Chengzhi (1908–1983) 廖承志		Male	Han	CCP	5 March 1978	18 June 1983	5 years, 105 days	5th	
Ji Pengfei (1910–2000) 姬鹏飞		Male	Han	CCP	5 March 1978	18 June 1983	5 years, 105 days	5th	
Xiao Jinguang (1903–1989) 萧劲光		Male	Han	CCP	1 July 1979	18 June 1983	3 years, 352 days	5th	
Zhu Yunshan (1887–1981) 朱蕴山		Male	Han	RCCK; Chairman; 1979–1981	1 July 1979	30 April 1981	1 year, 303 days	5th	
Shi Liang (1900–1985) 史良		Female	Han	CDL; Chairwoman; 1979–1985	1 July 1979	6 September 1985	6 years, 67 days	5th, 6th	
Peng Chong (1915–2010) 彭冲		Male	Han	CCP; Politburo; 1977–1982	10 September 1980	18 June 1983	2 years, 281 days	5th, 6th, 7th	
Xi Zhongxun (1913–2002) 习仲勋		Male	Han	CCP; Politburo; 1982–1987	10 September 1980	18 June 1983	2 years, 281 days	5th	
Xi Zhongxun (1913–2002) 习仲勋		Male	Han	CCP; Politburo; 1982–1987	8 April 1988	27 March 1993	4 years, 353 days	7th	
Su Yu (1907–1984) 粟裕		Male	Dong	CCP	10 September 1980	18 June 1983	2 years, 281 days	5th	
Yang Shangkun (1907–1998) 杨尚昆		Male	Han	CCP	10 September 1980	18 June 1983	2 years, 281 days	5th	
Zhu Xuefan (1905–1996) 朱学范		Male	Han	RCCK; Chairman; 1988–1992	13 December 1981	27 March 1993	11 years, 86 days	5th	
Chen Pixian (1916–1995) 陈丕显		Male	Han	CCP	18 June 1983	8 April 1988	4 years, 295 days	6th	
Geng Biao (1909–2000) 耿飚		Male	Han	CCP	18 June 1983	8 April 1988	4 years, 295 days	6th	
Wang Renzhong (1917–1992) 王任重		Male	Han	CCP	18 June 1983	8 April 1988	4 years, 295 days	6th	
Zhou Gucheng (1898–1996) 周谷城		Male	Han	CPWDP; Chairman; 1987–1988	18 June 1983	27 March 1993	9 years, 282 days	6th, 7th	
Yan Jici (1901–1996) 严济慈		Male	Han	JS	18 June 1983	27 March 1993	9 years, 282 days	6th, 7th	
Hu Yuzhi (1896–1986) 胡愈之		Male	Han	CDL; Acting Chairman; 1985–1986	18 June 1983	16 January 1986	2 years, 212 days	6th	
Rong Yiren (1916–2005) 荣毅仁		Male	Han	CNDCA	18 June 1983	27 March 1993	9 years, 282 days	6th, 7th	Chairman, All-China Federation of Industry and Commerce (1988–1993)
Rong Yiren (1916–2005) 荣毅仁		Male	Han	CCP (since 1985)(secretly)	18 June 1983	27 March 1993	9 years, 282 days	6th, 7th	Chairman, All-China Federation of Industry and Commerce (1988–1993)
Ye Fei (1914–1999) 叶飞		Male	Han	CCP	18 June 1983	27 March 1993	9 years, 282 days	6th, 7th	
Liao Hansheng (1911–2006) 廖汉生		Male	Han	CCP	18 June 1983	27 March 1993	9 years, 282 days	6th, 7th	
Han Xianchu (1913–1986) 韩先楚		Male	Han	CCP	18 June 1983	8 April 1988	4 years, 295 days	6th	
Huang Hua (1913–2010) 黄华		Male	Han	CCP	18 June 1983	8 April 1988	4 years, 295 days	6th	
Chu Tunan (1899–1994) 楚图南		Male	Han	CDL; Chairman; 1986–1987	12 April 1986	8 April 1988	1 year, 362 days	6th	
Ni Zhifu (1933–2013) 倪志福		Male	Han	CCP	8 April 1988	16 March 1998	9 years, 342 days	7th, 8th	Chairman, All-China Federation of Trade Unions (1978–1993)
Chen Muhua (1921–2011) 陈慕华		Female	Han	CCP	8 April 1988	16 March 1998	9 years, 342 days	7th, 8th	Chairwoman, All-China Women's Federation (1988–1998)
Fei Xiaotong (1910–2005) 费孝通		Male	Han	CDL; Chairman; 1987–1996	8 April 1988	16 March 1998	9 years, 342 days	7th, 8th	
Sun Qimeng (1911–2010) 孙起孟		Male	Han	CNDCA; Chairman; 1987–1996	8 April 1988	16 March 1998	9 years, 342 days	7th, 8th	
Lei Jieqiong (1905–2011) 雷洁琼		Female	Han	CAPD; Chairwoman; 1987–1997	8 April 1988	16 March 1998	9 years, 342 days	7th, 8th	
Wang Hanbin (born 1925) 王汉斌		Male	Han	CCP	8 April 1988	16 March 1998	9 years, 342 days	7th, 8th	
Tian Jiyun (born 1929) 田纪云		Male	Han	CCP	27 March 1993	15 March 2003	9 years, 353 days	8th, 9th	
Qin Jiwei (1914–1997) 秦基伟		Male	Han	CCP	27 March 1993	2 February 1997	3 years, 312 days	8th, 9th	
Li Ximing (1926–2008) 李锡铭		Male	Han	CCP	27 March 1993	16 March 1998	4 years, 354 days	8th	
Wang Bingqian (1925–2025) 王丙乾		Male	Han	CCP	27 March 1993	16 March 1998	4 years, 354 days	8th	
Pagbalha Geleg Namgyai (born 1940) འཕགས་པ་ལྷ་དགེ་ལེགས་རྣམ་རྒྱལ་ 帕巴拉·格列朗杰		Male	Tibetan	Non-partisan	27 March 1993	15 March 2003	9 years, 353 days	8th, 9th	
Wang Guangying (1919–2018) 王光英		Male	Han	CNDCA; Vice-Chairman	27 March 1993	15 March 2003	9 years, 353 days	8th, 9th	
Cheng Siyuan (1908–2005) 程思远		Male	Han	Non-partisan	27 March 1993	15 March 2003	9 years, 353 days	8th, 9th	
Lu Jiaxi (1915–2001) 卢嘉锡		Male	Han	CPWDP; Chairman; 1988–1997	27 March 1993	16 March 1998	4 years, 354 days	8th	
Buhe (1926–2017) ᠪᠥᠭᠡ 布赫		Male	Mongol	CCP	27 March 1993	15 March 2003	9 years, 353 days	8th, 9th	
Tömür Dawamat (1927–2018) تۆمۈرداۋامەت 铁木尔·达瓦买提		Male	Uyghur	CCP	27 March 1993	15 March 2003	9 years, 353 days	8th, 9th	
Gan Ku (1924–1993) 甘苦		Male	Han	CCP	27 March 1993	25 July 1993	120 days	8th	
Li Peiyao (1933–1996) 李沛瑶		Male	Han	RCCK; Chairman; 1992–1996	27 March 1993	2 February 1996 (killed)	2 years, 312 days	8th	
Wu Jieping (1917–2011) 吴阶平		Male	Han	JS; Chairman; 1992–2002	27 March 1993	15 March 2003	9 years, 353 days	8th, 9th	
Wu Jieping (1917–2011) 吴阶平		Male	Han	CCP	27 March 1993	15 March 2003	9 years, 353 days	8th, 9th	
Xie Fei (1932–1999) 谢非		Male	Han	CCP; Politburo; 1992–1999	16 March 1998	27 October 1999 (died)	1 year, 225 days	9th	
Jiang Chunyun (1930–2021) 姜春云		Male	Han	CCP	16 March 1998	15 March 2003	4 years, 364 days	9th	
Zou Jiahua (1926–2025) 邹家华		Male	Han	CCP	16 March 1998	15 March 2003	4 years, 364 days	9th	
Peng Peiyun (1929–2025) 彭珮云		Female	Han	CCP	16 March 1998	15 March 2003	4 years, 364 days	9th	Chairwoman, All-China Women's Federation (1998–2003)
He Luli (1934–2022) 何鲁丽		Female	Han	RCCK; Chairwoman; 1996–2007	16 March 1998	15 March 2008	9 years, 365 days	9th, 10th	
Zhou Guangzhao (1929–2024) 周光召		Male	Han	CCP	16 March 1998	15 March 2003	4 years, 364 days	9th	
Cheng Kejie (1933–2000) 成克杰		Male	Zhuang	CCP	16 March 1998	21 April 2000 (removed)	2 years, 36 days	9th	
Cao Zhi (1928–2020) 曹志		Male	Han	CCP	16 March 1998	15 March 2003	4 years, 364 days	9th	
Ding Shisun (1927–2019) 丁石孙		Male	Han	CDL; Chairman; 1996–2005	16 March 1998	15 March 2008	9 years, 365 days	9th, 10th	
Cheng Siwei (1935–2015) 成思危		Male	Han	CNDCA; Chairman; 1996–2007	16 March 1998	15 March 2008	9 years, 365 days	9th, 10th	
Xu Jialu (born 1937) 许嘉璐		Male	Han	CAPD; Chairman; 1997–2007	16 March 1998	15 March 2008	9 years, 365 days	9th, 10th	
Jiang Zhenghua (born 1937) 蒋正华		Male	Han	CPWDP; Chairman; 1997–2007	16 March 1998	15 March 2008	9 years, 365 days	9th, 10th	
Wang Zhaoguo (born 1941) 王兆国		Male	Han	CCP; Politburo; 2012–2017	15 March 2003	14 March 2013	9 years, 364 days	10th, 11th	Chairman, All-China Federation of Trade Unions (2002–2013)
Li Tieying (born 1936) 李铁映		Male	Han	CCP	15 March 2003	15 March 2008	5 years, 0 days	10th	
Ismail Amat (1935–2018) ئىسمائىل ئەھمەد 司马义·艾买提		Male	Uyghur	CCP	15 March 2003	15 March 2008	5 years, 0 days	10th	
Gu Xiulian (born 1936) 顾秀莲		Female	Han	CCP	15 March 2003	15 March 2008	5 years, 0 days	10th	Chairwoman, All-China Women's Federation (2003–2008)
Raidi (1938–2025) རག་སྡི་ 热地		Male	Tibetan	CCP	15 March 2003	15 March 2008	5 years, 0 days	10th	
Sheng Huaren (born 1935) 盛华仁		Male	Han	CCP	15 March 2003	15 March 2008	5 years, 0 days	10th	
Lu Yongxiang (born 1942) 路甬祥		Male	Han	CCP	15 March 2003	14 March 2013	9 years, 364 days	10th, 11th	President, Chinese Academy of Sciences (1997–2011)
Uyunqimg (1942–2024) ᠣᠶᠤᠨᠴᠢᠮᠡᠭ 乌云其木格		Female	Mongol	CCP	15 March 2003	14 March 2013	9 years, 364 days	10th, 11th	
Han Qide (born 1945) 韩启德		Male	Han	JS; Chairman; 2002–2012	15 March 2003	14 March 2013	9 years, 364 days	10th, 11th	
Han Qide (born 1945) 韩启德		Male	Han	CCP	15 March 2003	14 March 2013	9 years, 364 days	10th, 11th	
Fu Tieshan (1931–2007) 傅铁山		Male	Han	Non-partisan	15 March 2003	20 April 2007	4 years, 36 days	10th	Chairman, Chinese Patriotic Catholic Association; Bishop of Beijing
Hua Jianmin (born 1940) 华建敏		Male	Han	CCP	15 March 2008	14 March 2013	4 years, 364 days	11th	
Chen Zhili (born 1942) 陈至立		Female	Han	CCP	15 March 2008	14 March 2013	4 years, 364 days	11th	Chairwoman, All-China Women's Federation (2008–2013)
Zhou Tienong (1938–2023) 周铁农		Male	Han	RCCK; Chairman; 2007–2012	15 March 2008	14 March 2013	4 years, 364 days	11th	
Li Jianguo (born 1946) 李建国		Male	Han	CCP; Politburo; 2012–2017	15 March 2008	14 March 2018	9 years, 364 days	11th, 12th	Secretary-General, 11th NPCSC (2008–2013); Chairman, All-China Federation of Trade Unions (2013–2018)
Ismail Tiliwaldi (born 1944) ئىسمائىل تىلىۋالدى 司马义·铁力瓦尔地		Male	Uyghur	CCP	15 March 2008	14 March 2013	4 years, 364 days	11th	
Jiang Shusheng (born 1940) 蒋树声		Male	Han	CDL; Chairman; 2007–2012	15 March 2008	14 March 2013	4 years, 364 days	11th	
Chen Changzhi (born 1945) 陈昌智		Male	Han	CNDCA; Chairman; 2007–2017	15 March 2008	17 March 2018	10 years, 2 days	11th, 12th	
Yan Junqi (born 1946) 严隽琪		Female	Han	CAPD; Chairwoman; 2007–2017	15 March 2008	17 March 2018	10 years, 2 days	11th, 12th	
Sang Guowei (1941–2023) 桑国卫		Male	Han	CPWDP; Chairman; 2007–2012	15 March 2008	14 March 2013	4 years, 364 days	11th	
Wang Shengjun (born 1946) 王胜俊		Male	Han	CCP	14 March 2013	17 March 2018	5 years, 3 days	12th	
Wang Chen (born 1950) 王晨		Male	Han	CCP; Politburo; 2017–2022	14 March 2013	10 March 2023	9 years, 361 days	12th, 13th	Secretary-General, 12th NPCSC (2013–2018)
Shen Yueyue (born 1957) 沈跃跃		Female	Han	CCP	14 March 2013	10 March 2023	9 years, 361 days	12th, 13th	Chairwoman, All-China Women's Federation (2013–present)
Ji Bingxuan (born 1951) 吉炳轩		Male	Han	CCP	14 March 2013	10 March 2023	9 years, 361 days	12th, 13th	
Zhang Ping (born 1946) 张平		Male	Han	CCP	14 March 2013	17 March 2018	5 years, 3 days	12th	
Qiangba Puncog (born 1947) བྱམས་པ་ཕུན་ཚོགས 向巴平措		Male	Tibetan	CCP	14 March 2013	17 March 2018	5 years, 3 days	12th	
Arken Imirbaki (born 1953) 艾力更·依明巴海		Male	Uyghur	CCP	14 March 2013	10 March 2023	9 years, 361 days	12th, 13th	
Wan Exiang (born 1956) 万鄂湘		Male	Han	RCCK; Chairman; 2012–2022	14 March 2013	10 March 2023	9 years, 361 days	12th, 13th	
Zhang Baowen (born 1946) 张宝文		Male	Han	CDL; Chairman; 2012–2017	14 March 2013	17 March 2018	5 years, 3 days	12th	
Chen Zhu (born 1953) 陈竺		Male	Han	CPWDP; Chairman; 2012–2022	14 March 2013	10 March 2023	9 years, 361 days	12th, 13th	President, Red Cross Society of China; Vice-President, International Federation of Red Cross and Red Crescent Societies
Cao Jianming (born 1955) 曹建明		Male	Han	CCP	17 March 2018	10 March 2023	4 years, 358 days	13th	
Zhang Chunxian (born 1953) 张春贤		Male	Han	CCP	17 March 2018	10 March 2023	4 years, 358 days	13th	
Padma Choling (born 1952) པདྨ་འཕྲིན་ལས་ 白玛赤林		Male	Tibetan	CCP	17 March 2018	10 March 2023	4 years, 358 days	13th	

== See also ==
- Standing Committee of the National People's Congress
  - Council of Chairpersons
    - Chairman
    - Secretary-General
- National Committee of the Chinese People's Political Consultative Conference
  - Vice Chairpersons
