= 8th National People's Congress =

1993–1998 Chinese legislative session

8th National People's Congress 第八届全国人民代表大会
- National emblem of China

15 March 1993 – 5 March 1998 (4 years, 355 days) Overview
- Type: Supreme organ of state power
- Election: Indirect elections

Leadership
- Chairman: Qiao Shi
- Vice Chairmen: Tian Jiyun, Wang Hanbin, Ni Zhifu, Chen Muhua, Fei Xiaotong, Sun Qimeng, Lei Jieqiong, Li Ximing, Wang Bingqian, Pagbalha Geleg Namgyai, Wang Guangying, Cheng Siyuan, Lu Jiaxi, Buhe, Tömür Dawamat, Wu Jieping, Gan Ku, Li Peiyao, and Qin Jiwei
- Secretary-General: Cao Zhi
- Standing Committee: 155 (8th)

Members
- Total: 2,977 members

8th National People's Congress
- Traditional Chinese: 第八屆全國人民代表大會
- Simplified Chinese: 第八届全国人民代表大会
Transcriptions
Standard Mandarin
- Hanyu Pinyin: Dìbā Jiè Quánguó Rénmín Dàibiǎo Dàhuì

Abbreviation
- Traditional Chinese: 第八屆全國人大
- Simplified Chinese: 第八届全国人大
Transcriptions
Standard Mandarin
- Hanyu Pinyin: Dìbā Jiè Quánguó Réndà

The 8th National People's Congress (NPC) was in session from 1993 to 1998. It succeeded the 7th National People's Congress. It held five sessions in this period.

== Seat distribution ==
Major party	General Secretary	Seats
Chinese Communist Party	Jiang Zemin	2,037
Other Parties	Chairperson	Seats
Chinese Peasants' and Workers' Democratic Party	Jiang Zhenghua	572
Jiusan Society	Wu Jieping	572
China Democratic League	Ding Shisun	572
China Association for Promoting Democracy	Xu Jialu	572
China National Democratic Construction Association	Cheng Siwei	572
Revolutionary Committee of the Chinese Kuomintang	He Luli	572
Taiwan Democratic Self-Government League	Zhang Kehui	572
China Zhi Gong Party	Luo Haocai	572
Independents	N/A	572

== The first session ==
=== Elected state leaders ===
In the 1st Session in 1993, the Congress elected the state leaders:

- President of the People's Republic of China: Jiang Zemin
- Chairman of the Standing Committee of the National People's Congress: Qiao Shi
- Premier of the State Council: Li Peng
- Chairman of the Central Military Commission: Jiang Zemin
- President of the Supreme People's Court: Ren Jianxin
- Procurator-General of the Supreme People's Procuratorate: Zhang Siqing
