= Liaoning delegation to the National People's Congress =

Liaoning Delegation to the National People's Congress
- 全国人民代表大会辽宁省代表团
- Delegation for the National People's Congress
- Map showing the location of Liaoning Province
- Electoral unit: Liaoning Province
- Population: 42,591,407

Current Delegation
- Created: 1954
- Seats: 94
- Head of delegation: Hao Peng
- Provincial People's Congress: Liaoning Provincial People's Congress

The Liaoning delegation to the National People's Congress is a delegation composed of deputies representing Liaoning Province within the National People's Congress (NPC), the supreme organ of state power of the People's Republic of China. NPC deputies from the Liaoning Province are officially elected by the Liaoning Provincial People's Congress.

== List of deputies ==
Year	NPC sessions	Deputies	Number of deputies	Ref.
1954	1st	Mao Henian, Wang Zheng, Tong Yulan, Wu Yingkai, Wu Fengqi, Song Li, Li Chuanjiang, Li Diping, Li Tao, Gu Faming, Qiu Xinye, Hatu, Shi Yuhai, Wei Yuxi, Gao Yang, Zhang Wenchun, Zhang Xuesi, Zhang Ze, Chen Shunyao, Ning Wu, Yang Zhupo, Liu Hongda, Zheng Kuifu, Qian Zhongju: By-election on June 29, 1957: Liu Shenge	24	
1959	2nd	Ding Guitang, Yu Zhenying, Wang Wenshan, Wang Yuji, Wang Shizong, Wang Zhong, Wang Hengcheng, Wang Bingnan, Wang Chonglun, Wang Feng'en, Deng Zhaoxiang, Mao Henian, Liu Lifu, Liu Baotian, Liu Hongda, Liu Shengtian, Liu Shenge, Liu Lanbo, Gong Tianmin, Sun Xiaoju (female), Che Xiangchen, Yan Jici, Li Chengjun, Li Tingshun, Li Baoshu, Li Bingxun, Li Feng (female), Li Enye, Li Xun, Li Xikui, Chen Xianzhu, Wu Zhizhong, Wu Yingkai, Lü Zhengcao, Tong Yulan (female), Pang Guanxiang, Zheng Xikun, Lin Han Da, Lin Feng, Zhang Dayu, Zhang Wenchun, Zhang Wenyu, Zhang Junxiu, Zhang Zhenfa, Zhang Kai, Meng Tai, Shao Xianghua, Jin Zhaoye, Qiu Xinye, Yu Guanghan, Jiang Peilu, Lou Erkang, Zhao Guoqiang, Zhao Qing, Hu Zhaosen, Hu Ming, Hu Yuzhi, Gao Yang, Gao Fengqin (female), Tang Liyan, Li Decui, Xu Xingzhu, Guo Shushen, Cao Jiqing, Wei Fengying (female), Ning Wu, Fei Guangtai, Huang Oudong, Yu Ping, Jin Shuliang, Yang Keying (female), Yang Shutang, Yang Haibo, Qian Zhongju, Han Guang, Wei Xi, Gu Jingxin	77	
1964	3rd	Ding Dan, Bu Fan, Yu Wangui, Yu Lan, Yu Xi'en, Wan Laitian, Ma Yunge, Ma Longxiang, Wen Shuzhen, Wang Feng'en, Wang Fengqin, Wang Yuji, Wang Shizong, Wang Dazhi, Wang Xiulan, Wang Hengcheng, Wang Chonglun, Wang Pengcheng, Wang Heshou, Zhi Bingyuan, Che Xiangchen, Qiu Youwen, Feng Guansui, Wu Shuyang, Deng Zhaoxiang, Ning Ruji, Ning Wu, Bai Ju, Si Qin, An Bo, Liu Huafeng, Liu Baotian, Liu Hongda, Liu Ronglin, Liu Shengtian, Liu Bin, Liu Shenge, Liu Muwen, Liu Lanbo, Qi Guihua, Guan Wenqi, Xu Xingzhu, Xu Xi, Xu Dianyi, Gong Tianmin, Bi Wenting, Shi Xiaofan, Shi Changxu, Lü Zhengcao, Lü Deshun, Zhu Bao Lin, Sun Xiaoju, Shen Hongtao, Wang Wenqing, Song Zexing, Song Renqiong, Yan Jici, Du Yuzhen, Du Shisong, Li Chengjun, Li Tingshun, Li Yan, Li Xueying, Li Baoshu, Li Songtang, Li Peilin, Li Bingxun, Li Huang, Li Jun'en, Li Jingxiong, Li Suwen, Li Enye, Li Xikui, Li Yingsheng, Li Xun, Yang Wei, Yang Kebing, Yang Shutang, Yang Haibo, Yang Chiyin, Wu Dayou, Wu Daguan, Wu Zhizhong, Wu Yingkai, Wu Ji'en, Yu Qin, Yu Xiaping, He Yizhen, He Guozhu, He Yinchun, Tong Yulan, Tong Yuxiu, Zhang Dayu, Zhang Wenchun, Zhang Wenyu, Zhang Yumei, Zhang Erci, Zhang Cunhao, Zhang Quan, Zhang LijunZhang Zhongshan, Zhang Kai, Zhang Jinhou, Zhang Jiemei, Zhang Shengji, Zhang Junxiu, Zhang Hailan, Zhang Zhenfa, Zhang Zhenhua, Zhang Zhenkai, Zhang Qin, Lu Yongsheng, Chen Yifan, Chen Xianzhu, Chen Yusen, Chen Dai, Chen Enfeng, Chen Shuren, Chen Shuzhen, Shao Yu, Shao Xianghua, Pang Ran, Zheng Xiaoxie, Zheng Xikun, Fan Chongmo, Lin Handa, Lin Jie, Luo Yuejia, Jin Zhifu, Jin Ailian, Jin Zhaoye, Zhou Ming'an, Zhou Jiahua, Zhou Rong, Meng Qingchun, Meng Tai, Hong Baoshun, Hong Ying, Jiang Shuzhen, Jiang Peilu, Lou Erkang, Zhao Guoqiang, Zhao Qing, Zhao Jingdang, Zhao Yuliang, Rong Ke, Hu Changcheng Hu Yuxi, Hu Zhaosen, Hu Guodong, Hu Ming, Hu Yuzhi, Liu Wen, Yu Shouren, Yu Guanghan, Hou Yufen, Fei Guangtai, He Zhi, Gao Yang, Guo Kexin, Tang Zhiping, Li Decui, Gu Gutong, Gu Jinquan, Gu Jingxin, Weng Xintong, Qian Lingxi, Qian Zhongju, Xu Tianxi, Xu Shugang, Xu Shunshou, Zhang Yunlong, Zhang Yongzhong, Zhang Shougong, Zhang Yan, Zhang Zhoufen, Yan Guxing, Cao Jiqing, Wei Fengying, Wen Jianzhong, Huang Zhiqian, Huang Oudong, Huang Xinmin, Ge Tingsui, Han Xiufen, Dou Lifang, Lei Tianzhuang, Yu Guangyu, Xie Yuzhi, Cai Changnian, Zhai Zhanxing, Wei Xi, Qu Jiu	193	
1975	4th	Yu Qiren, Yu Mingyi, Yu Haifeng, Ma Yulan, Wang Feng'en, Wang Bentang, Wang Cai, Wang Xiuchun, Wang Qiufeng, Wang Hongshun, Wang Hongmei, Wang Suqing, Wang Zhenhai, Wang Enyuan, Wang Chonglun, Wang Shufang, Wang Jingsheng, Wang Fuyin, Che Pi'en, Mao Yuanxin, Mao Hekui, Fang Yongshu, Tian Yuzhen, Bai Yincang, Bai Qian, Gong Tianmin, Cheng Jialu, Lü Congzhou, Lü Zhonglan, Lü Deshun, Zhu Baolin, Ren Baocheng, Ren Shaofen, Liu Wentai, Liu Yinghua, Liu Jingui, Liu Huifen, Sun Weidong, Sun Demin, Su Aiwu, Du Hongzhen, Li Ping, Li Zhanxing, Li Chengfu, Li Xing'en, Li Zhijie, Li Gangcheng, Li Guofan, Li Bingxun, Li He, Li Su Wen, Li Peiyuan, Li Chao, Li Xun, Yang Hongwei, Yang Jianfa, Yang Guipin, Yang Jinghua, Xiao Honglian, He Linsheng, Xin Guoqing, Song Guomin, Zhang Yunqing, Zhang Wenyi, Zhang Youming, Zhang Jianhua, Zhang Shude, Zhang Guizhi, Zhang Guizhen, Zhang Tiesheng, Zhang Fuzhi, Zhang Qunling, Chen Dai, Wu Guocai, Ji Xuewu, Jin Daoshan, Zhou Ming, Zhou Qingyou, Zheng Chunfa, Meng Wenhuan, Meng Jiyong, Zhao Shijie, Zhao Zuocheng, Hu Zhonghai, Hu Fengming, Jiang Shuhua, Jiang Yaqin, Lou Erkang, Qian Lingxi, Ni Meizhen, Ni Fuling, Xu Fumao, Gao Tingquan, Gao Guiying, Huang Yongtai, Cao Shanbai, Cui Yushun, Slengbalaj, Dong Yuqin, Jiang ZhongjuHan Shengxin, Jing Changsheng, Cheng Fengjiu, Fu Guoquan, Zeng Yangqing, Zhen Hongchuan, Zhen Dianqi, Xie Xicheng, Li Guanghui, Wei Bingkui	110	
1978	5th	Ding Guotian, Yu Wenlong, Yu Shouxin, Yu Qiren, Yu Shuli, Ma Dapei, Ma Yunge, Ma Yulian, Ma Longxiang, Ma Bin, Wang Wenru, Wang Shizong, Wang Bentang, Wang Tongshun, Wang Xiulan, Wang Baochun, Wang Jianjia, Wang Guiqi, Wang Suhui, Wang Jiyi, Wang Chonglun, Wang Shufang, Wang Zanping, Wuligeng, Wen Dagen, Fang Xiuzhen, Yin Hailiang, Gan Yuanli, Lu Shenghe, Tian Yuzhen, Ning Ruji, Bi Zhende, Shi Changxu, Qu Wenying, Ren Zhongyi, Liu Huafeng, Liu Zhanwen, Liu Yongzhou, Liu Shusheng, Liu Guirong, Liu Zenghao, Qi Yanmei, Guan Mingyuan, Sun Qitian, Sun Demin, Yan Jici, Su Jingyue, Li Yuxiu, Li Xingen Li Yan, Li Songtang, Li Xueying, Li Huang, Li Zhenjia, Li Xun, Yang Guanglin, Yang Chengchun, Yang Yuewei, Yang Baoqing, Yang Jianfa, Yang Shutang, Wu Guang, Wu Shaoxin, He Guozhu, Tong Yulan, Zou De'an, Wang Wenqing, Shahula, Shen Hongtao, Song Guang, Song Zexing, Song Jian, Chi Yongsheng, Zhang Yumei, Zhang Zhengde, Zhang Erci, Zhang Quan, Zhang Lijun, Zhang Yingxiang, Zhang Shengji, Amuguleng, Chen Yuliang, Chen Lianchun, Chen Dai, Chen Jinsheng, Chen Yusen, Chen Enfeng, Chen Shuzhen, Lin Yiyuan, Jin Huashi, Jin Haiyue, Jin Runsu, Jin Daoshan, Zhou Huixuan, Pang Ran, Zheng Mingjun, Zheng Chunfa, Zhao Mingxuan, Zhao Xiang, Zhao JingshanZhao Bin, Hu Yuxi, Hu Guodong, Hu Ming, Hu Zhonghai, Hu Yuzhi, Jiang Jiqing, Jiang Zhenzhou, Jiang Peilu, Lou Erkang, Lou Jingyu, Hong Ying, Hong Chengke, Qian Lingxi, Xu Guilan, Gao Guiying, Guo Kexin, Guo Shushen, Guo Zhongming, Guo Hefu, Guo Xuedao, Zhan Guiying, Tao Weizhong, Huang Huoqing, Huang Shirong, Huang Yongtai, Huang Baozeng, Huang Xinmin, Cao Chunhua, Chang Jingchuan, Cui Daoyong, Zhang Zhoufen, Yan Deyi, Si Qin, Ge Xingde, Ge Tingsui, Han Xiufen, Han Weixian, Cheng Xu, Jiao Shijie, Zeng Shaoshan, Xie Zhenfu, Dou Lifang, Cai Changnian, Zhai Hongru, Pan Shaozhou, Xue Shue	147	
1983	6th	Yu Qiren, Yu Jie, Ma Shisheng, Ma Dapei, Ma Yunge, Ma Yulian, Ma Longxiang, Ma Guang, Ma Zhenwen, Ma Dianfeng, Wang Changrong, Wang Danbo, Wang Zhengli, Wang Yongqin, Wang Qingyun, Wang Kun, Wang Zhenghe, Wang Xueshan, Wang Jianjia, Wang Shuyun, Wang Shufang, Wang Weijin, Wang Rong, Wang Zanping, Lu Shenghe, Ye Xingjie, Tian Fuheng, Ning Ruji, Ning Peiying, Si Qin, Shi Changxu, Qu Xiao, Lü Weiping, Ren Yaoxian, Quan Shuren, Liu Yuzhi, Liu Zongqing, Qi Fenglai, Guan Yanxin, Guan Litian, Guan Yu'an, Tang Wu, Xu Guolin, Xu Guixian, Sun Jianhua, Yan Jici, Yan Zaishun, Li Changchun, Li Yunan, Li Zhimin Li Xiuzhi, Li Maofeng, Li Songtang, Li Xueying, Li Gencheng, Li Runtin, Li Shengtu, Li Deshen, Yang Yulan, Yang Shiming, Yang Kebing, Yang Baoqing, Yang Shengdong, Yang Hui, Lian Chengzhi, Wu Liang, He Yingtai, Shen Zhengzhi, Shen Yue, Song Zexing, Song Limin, Zhang Wanjun, Zhang Jiurong, Zhang Zhengde, Zhang Quan, Zhang Lizhen, Zhang Yanjie, Zhang Guoshi, Zhang Chengwu, Zhang Li, Zhang Guilan, Zhang Tiejun, Zhang Jianzhong, Zhang Aiping, Zhang Dianli, Lu Qili, Chen Zuwei, Chen Enfeng, Chen Shuzhen, Shao Jiayu, Lin Yi'ai, Lin Xunjuan, Yu Wenqing, Luo Guoying, Zhou Yeshen, Zhou Zhongren, Zhou Houji, Zheng Ping, Zheng Hua, Jing Ming'enZhao Renqing, Zhao Jixiang, Zhao Mingxuan, Zhao Fu, Hu Yimin, Hu Guodong, Liu Wen, Yu Dawei, Yu Zeyou, Jiang Peilu, Jiang Shuzhen, Lou Erkang, Hong Ying, Qin Fenglan, Nie Qin, Xia Dezhao, Qian Lingxi, Xu Guilan, Aisin- Gioro Pujie, Guo Kexin, Guo Hefu, Guo Feng, Tao Wei, Cao Mingyuan, Cui Dezhi, Zhang Zhoufen, Yan Deyi, Liang Wenxuan, Liang Yuming, Ge Taisheng, Jiang Shuoan, Han Shaoyun, Han Jishan, Han Jian, Han Weixian, Cheng Baohua, Cheng Xichang, Fu Qin, Wen Yuzhi, Fu Pingbo, Wei Fuhai	141	
1988	7th	Ding Zhaomin, Yu Ruomei, Yu Guolong, Yu Guopan, Ma Shisheng, Ma Longxiang, Ma Yanli, Ma Licui, Ma Suqin, Ma Zhenwen, Ma Dianfeng, Wang Yunfeng, Wang Zhala, Wang Changchun, Wang Wenqian, Wang Liping, Wang Yachen, Wang Dagao, Wang Guangzhong, Wang Chunshan, Wang Guozhen, Wang Jianjia, Wang Zhengguo, Wang Huiyun, Deng Fenglan, Lu Shenghe, You Zuowu, Shi Jiwen, Bai Xiyao, Feng Yuzhong, Feng Zhenfei, Ning Ruji, Xing Helin, Zhu Qidan, Zhu Guochen, Zhu Bingliang, Zhu Jiazhen, Hua Aifang, Liu Guangzheng, Liu Xuangong, Liu Xiangrong, Liu Mianguang, Liu Zhenhuan, Guan Wenjie, Sun Qi, Yan Jici, Yan Zaishun, Li Daqiang, Li Changchun, Li Qing Yu, Li Jun, Li Chang'an, Li Xueying, Li Zongxiang, Li Guilian, Li Runtin, Li Jixue, Li Shengtu, Yang Fengcai, Yang Shengdong, Yang Lieyu, Yang Hui, Yang Xinhua, Xiao Caiqin, Shi Mingyang, Wu Yugui, Wu Ruzhou, Wu Zhe, Wu Shufang, Wu Jingnan, Wu Liang, Yuan Huating, Shen Zhengzhi, Song Zexing, Zhang Wencheng, Zhang Shude, Zhang Quan, Zhang Yu, Zhang Zhixun, Zhang Lizhen, Zhang Fenglin, Zhang Linsheng, Zhang Baofu, Zhang Tiejun, Zhang Xiaoyun, Zhang Huanwen, Zhang Zhiyi, Zhang Yuxue, Zhang Dianli, Zhang Deli, Chen Daxin, Chen Zuwei, Chen Enfeng, Chen Shuzhen, Chen Muhua, Chen Hui, Wu Disheng, Lin Yiyuan, Lin Xunjuan, Guo PeirongLuo Guoying, Zhou Shouzhong, Zhou Baolin, Zhou Houji, Zhou Zhongzhi, Zheng Ping, Zhao Wenlin, Zhao Weiming, Zhao Xinliang, Hu Zhanshan, Hu Shiying, Hu Guoqing, Hu Guodong, Zhong Baoqi, Yu Zeyou, Lou Erkang, Luo Jixun, Xia Qi, Xia Dezhao, Gu Songfen, Qian Lingxi, Xu Chen, Aisin - Gioro Pujie, Gao Wentian, Guo Tingbiao, Guo Yunfa, Guo Hefu, Gong Shiping, Cui Dezhi, Liang Zhide, Ti Jiuqin, Peng Qingyuan, Han Shaoyun, Han Jishan, Han Weixian, Cheng Xian, Fu Zhongpeng, Wen Yuzhi, Xie Zhaoyi, Jin Zhonghua, Bao Zhiqiang, Li Peng, Yan Hua, Wei Fuhai		
1993	8th	Ding Zhaomin, Yu Guolong, Yu Jianhua, Yu Enguang, Ma Yanli, Wang Kaiyuan, Wang Yunfeng, Wang Changchun, Wang Yachen, Wang Chen, Wang Huabin, Wang Shoubin, Wang Guozhen, Wang Jinguo, Wang Xiancong, Wang Diandong, Mao Fengmei, Bian Guosheng, Ba Dianpu, Deng Fenglan, Zuo Kun, Shi Yuhong, Shi Jiwen, Bai Xiyao, Feng Yousong, Feng Yuzhong, Feng Fuchun, Xing Helin, Zhu Fengyun, Zhu Bingliang, Zhu Qingshi, Zhu Yaxuan, Quan Shuren, Liu Guangzheng, Liu Xuangong, Liu Zhilin, Liu Baolin, Liu Xiangrong, Liu Hongda, Liu Tiehua, Liu Qingfu, Liu Yajing, Guan Guangsheng, Guan Yongguang, Xu Lei, Sun Xingwu, Sun Qi, Sun Shangqing, Du Qingjiang, Li Yuzhen Li Zhenglong, Li Ben, Li Huazhong, Li Yingfa, Li Shaozhou, Li Yingkai, Li Guilian, Li Xiaoan, Li Runtin, Li Jixue, Li Hongbin, Li Senmao, Li Jing, Li Jingfu, Li Jingwen, Yang Zhenya, Yang Lieyu, Yang Bin, Xiao Caiqin, Shi Mingyang, Wu Yugui, Wu Ruzhou, Wu Tingbao, He Sanguang, He Jiezhi, Leng Shumei, Shen Guangshun, Song Muwen, Zhang Wencheng, Zhang Shenggui, Zhang Lijing, Zhang Zaihua, Zhang Guoguang, Zhang Baofu, Zhang Qianjiang, Zhang Xiaojun, Zhang Huanwen, Zhang Zhiyi, Zhang Yumao, Zhang Deyuan, Chen Daxin, Chen Ying, Chen Suzhi, Chen Jiaer, Chen Muhua, Wu Fengqin, Wu Disheng, Lin Yiyuan, Yue Qifeng, Yue ZhendongJin Lianwu, Zhou Chongzhi, Zhou Baolin, Zhao Rukang, Zhao Xiyou, Zhao Xiang, Hu Shiying, Wen Shizhen, Jiang Yunxian, Jiang Kerang, Hong Chengli, Luo Jixun, Qin Derong, Yuan Yi, Xia Fuxiang, Gu Songfen, Enhe Batu, Aisin-Gioro Pujie, Gao Wentian, Gao Canye, Guo Mingzi, Guo Hefu, Guo Linghua, Huang Jianmei, Huang Tian, Huang Enyuan, Qi Qifan, Gong Shiping, Chang Yi, Cui Zaishu, Yan Chunhe, Yan Baoqin, Liang Zhide, Wei Duan'en, Peng Qingyuan, Ge Xiaoguang, Dong Wei, Dong Qifeng, Cheng Shengzhong, Xie Fenglin, Xie Zhaoyi, Jin Zhonghua, Bao Zhendong, Li Peng, Bo Xilai, Wei Dejiang		
1998	9th	Ding Dewen, Yu Shichun, Yu Zhiquan, Yu Xuexiang, Yu Jianhua, Yu Enguang, Wang Dacao, Wang Ziqing, Wang Tianran, Wang Huabin, Wang Shoubin, Wang Xiufen, Wang Huaiyuan, Wang Guoxun, Wang Zhenqiu, Wang Shuyuan, Wang Fucheng, Mao Fengmei (Manchu), Ba Furong (Manchu), Ba Dianpu, Zuo Changlin, Cong Zhenglong, Bao Xinhe, Bao Ruiling (Mongolian), Feng Yuzhong, Xing Helin (Mongolian), Lü Xinjiu, Zhu Xiangyuan, Zhu Bingliang, Liu Guangzheng, Liu Jie, Liu Baolin, Liu Xiangrong (Hui), Liu Hongda (Manchu), Guan Guangsheng (Manchu), Qi Yamin (Manchu), Xu Weiguo, Xu Huangang, Sun Xingwu (Xibe), Li Zhengde, Li Huazhong, Li Jing, Li Guixian, Li Guiqin (Mongolian), Li Guilian, Li Xiaoan, Li Hong Bin (Hui), Li Xiping, Li Jingwen, Yang Jie (Hui), Wu Qicheng, Wu Xuefeng, He Dachuan, Leng Shumei, Song Muwen, Zhang Dinghua, Zhang Wencheng, Zhang Dongsheng, Zhang Lijing, Zhang Zaihua, Zhang Lifan, Zhang Mingyuan, Zhang Rongmao, Zhang Guixing, Zhang Qianjiang (Hui), Zhang Zhenwu, Zhang Xinzhi, Zhang Yumao, Zhang Heling, Chen Fanghong, Chen Mingyue, Chen Zhongbiao, Chen Suzhi (Manchu), Chen Hui, Fan Fangping, Fan Jingyi, Yue Zhendong, Jin Zhuhua (Korean), Jin Lianwu (Manchu), Zhou Yinxiao, Wen Shizhen, Yao Yong, Yao Hui, Qin Bailan, Yuan Fuxiu, Jia Yi, Gu Xiulian, Gu Jinchi, Gu Songfen, Chai Tianyou, Xu Tingsheng, Gao Wentian, Gao Yirong, Gao Jizhong, Guo Zongchang, Xi Huanjiu (Manchu), Huang Tian, Huang SuqinHuang Enyuan, Qi Qifan, Gong Shangwu, Liang Zengbiao, Dong Wande, Dong Lingyi (Manchu), Dong Qifeng, Han Shuqi, Cheng Gengdong, Cheng Shengzhong, Lu Wenfang (Mongolian), Lu Chengyu, Chu Guangyu~~Mu Suixin~~Teng Weiping, Pan Zhaokui, Bo Xilai, and Wei Baowei (Manchu ethnicity)		
2003	10th	Ding Shifa, Yu Jianhua (female), Wang Erjiang, Wang Daping, Wang Tianran, Wang Shoubin, Wang Huaiyuan, Wang Baojun, Wang Chunpeng, Wang Xianzheng (female), Wang Yanbin (female), Wang Shuyuan (female), Mao Fengmei (Manchu), Yin Wen, Ba Furong (female, Manchu), Shi Ying (female), Bao Xinhe, Feng Dazhong, Lü Wenjun, Zhu Yucheng (Manchu), Zhu Xiangyuan, Zhong Jiquan, Liu Daxing, Liu Changjiang, Liu Hua (female), Liu Jie, Liu Guoqiang, Liu Zhongtian (Manchu), Liu Hongkai, Liu Jibin, Liu Ming, Xu Zhihui (female), Sun Yuanliang, Sun Du, Sun Shujun (female), Li Wenke, Li Fangyong, Li Yongjin, Li Jun (Mongolian), Li Jindian, Li Maozhi (female), Li Bo, Li Guilian (female), Li Fudong, Wu Liying (female) Xibe, Qiu Dong, He Jing (female, Mongolian), Ying Songnian, Shen Diancheng, Song Xingguo, Song Yong, Chi Xiaoqiu (female), Zhang Dinghua, Zhang Wencheng, Zhang Zhanyu, Zhang Lijun, Zhang Yongquan, Zhang Wei, Zhang Jiehui, Zhang Mingyuan, Zhang Guiping (female), Zhang Fusheng, Zhang Xilin, Zhang Yumao, Zhang Dexiang, Zhang Yi, Chen Jinfeng (Manchu), Chen Zhenggao, Chen Haibo, Chen Huiren, Jin Zhuhua (female, Korean), Jin Lianwu (Manchu), Zhou Furen, Zhao Benshan, Zhao Mingpeng, Zhao Shouyi, Zhao Xizhong, Zhao Peng, Zhao Xinliang (Manchu), Wen Shizhen, Jiang Zuoyong, Jiang Tiejun (Manchu), Yao Zhiping, Yao Yong (female), Yao Hui, He Rongguang, Yuan Fuxiu, Geng Chenghui (Manchu), Xia Deren, Gu Xiulian (female), Gao BaoyuGao Yirong, Gao Peng (female, Manchu), Gao Fuyu, Guo Guangrong, Guo Tingbiao (Hui), Huang Yukui, Qi Xiuyu (female), Cui Wenxin, Liang Bing (female), Liang Jinfeng, Liang Zengbiao, Dong Lingyi (female, Manchu), Han Zhaoshan, Cheng Yajun, Cheng Gengdong, Lu Wenfang (female, Mongolian), Lu Chengyu (female), Lu Yongxiang, He Jicheng (Manchu), Teng Weiping, Bo Xilai		
2008	11th	Yu Hong, Wang Wanbin, Wang Tianran, Wang Zhanzhu (Mongolian), Wang Yongsheng, Wang Shoubin, Wang Huaiyuan, Wang Baojun, Wang Chuncheng, Wang Junlian (female), Wang Liang, Wang Zuwen, Wang Zhenhua, Wang Guirong (female), Wang Weizhong, Wang Qiong, Mao Fengmei (Manchu), Ba Furong (female, Manchu), Ai Hongde, Shi Ying (female), Tian Fuquan, Bao Ruiling (female, Mongolian), Feng Dazhong, Feng Hong (female), Jiang Rui (Manchu), Qu Baoxue, Liu Zhixu, Liu Hua (female), Liu Xingqiang, Liu Zhiqiang, Liu Guoqiang, Liu Zhongtian (Manchu), Liu Qiang, Yan Feng, Tang Xiaoquan (female), Sun Zhaolin, Sun Shoukuan, Sun Hong, Sun Du, Sun Shujun (female), Li Dongqi, Li Jun (Mongolian), Li Jindian, Li Keqiang, Li Yingjie, Li Mingke, Li Xiaodong, Yang Min (female), Bing Zhigang, Xiao Sheng, Xiao Zuofu (Manchu), He Zhuosheng (Manchu), He Jing (female, Mongolian), Gu Wentao, Gu Chunli, Shen Lirong (female), Huai Zhongmin, Zhang Fengshan, Zhang Wencheng, Zhang Wenyue, Zhang Yukun (female), Zhang Zhanyu, Zhang Xingxiang, Zhang Xingkai, Zhang Surong (female), Zhang Guiping (female), Zhang Xiaogang, Zhang Tiehan, Zhang Tiemin, Zhang Jingqiang, Zhang Xilin, Chen Bicheng, Chen Zhenggao, Chen Tiexin, Chen Shuzhen (female), Chen Huiren, Chen Wenfu, Wu Xiujun (female, Manchu), Ou Jinping, Jin Zhuhua (female, Korean), Jin Lianwu (Manchu), Zheng Jiyu, Meng Lingbin (Manchu), Zhao Changyi, Zhao Changyu (Manchu), Zhao Huaming, Zhao Xizhong, Wen Shizhen, Jiang Zuoyong, He Min (female), Geng Chenghui (Manchu), Jia Nianji, Jia Changsheng (Xibe), Xia Deren, Xu Qiang, Gao Liangbin (Manchu)Gao Baoyu, Guo Lei, Tang Zhiguo, Sheng Songcheng, Liang Bing (female), Han Zhaoshan, Han Youbo (Hui), He Jicheng (Manchu), Pei Hongbin, Tan Wenhua, Teng Weiping, Pan Liguo, Yan Fulong, Dai Yuzhong		
2013	12th	~~Yu Hong~~, Yu Kuizhi (Hui),Wang ~~Wenliang~~, Wang Zhengpu, Wang Shiwei, ~~Wang Zhanzhu (Mongolian)~~, ~~Wang Shoubin~~, Wang Zhixue, Wang Mingyu, Wang Jindi, Wang ~~Baojun~~, ~~Wang Jianming~~, ~~Wang Chuncheng~~, Wang Min, Wang Shun, Wang Junlian (female), Wang Zuwen, Wang Guifen (female), ~~Wang Jiajuan (female), Mao Fengmei (Manchu)~~, Fang ~~Wei~~, Shi Guang, ~~Bao Zichen (Mongolian)~~, Bao Ruiling (female, Mongolian), Feng Dazhong, Feng Yuping (female), Ning Guiling (female), ~~Qu Baoxue~~, Lü Shujiang (Mongolian), ~~Zhu Jingli~~, ~~Liu~~ Fenghai, ~~Liu Zhixu~~, Liu Hongyan (female, Mongolian), Liu Zhengkui, ~~Liu Qinglian (female, Manchu)~~, ~~Liu Fuxiang~~, ~~Qi Mu~~, Xu Wenyu, ~~Sun~~ Shoukuan, ~~Sun Chunshan, Li~~ Wancai,Li ~~Yuhuan (female, Manchu)~~ Li ~~Dongqi~~, Li Feng, ~~Li Haiyang~~, Li Jingtian (Manchu), Yang Zhonglin (Mongolian), ~~Yang Min (female)~~, Xiao Sheng, Wu Yesong, Li Jingrui (Manchu), ~~He Zhuosheng (Manchu)~~, Tong Zhiwu,Leng Shengjun, Song Shuxin, Zhang Guangning, Zhang Wencheng, ~~Zhang~~ Yukun (female), Zhang ~~Zhanyu~~ (Manchu~~),~~ Zhang Xingkai, Zhang, ~~Zhang Surong (female)~~, ~~Zhang Zhenyong~~, ~~Zhang Xiaofang (female)~~, Zhang ~~Tiehan~~, ~~Chen~~ Zhenggao, Chen Wenfu, ~~Jin Zhanzhong (Manchu)~~, Meng Lingbin (Manchu), Xiang Xiaoyun (female), Zhao Changyi, Zhao Guohong (female), ~~Liu Changqing~~, ~~Jiang Xiuyun (female)~~, ~~Yao Tingcai~~, He Min (female), Du Benwei (Mongolian), ~~Geng Hongchen~~, Gao Hongbin, ~~Gao Baoyu~~, ~~Guo Guanghua~~, Guo Qiyong, Guo Lei, Tang Shuangning (Manchu), Huang Taiyan, Cao JianmingChang ~~Wei (female)~~, Ge Lefu, ~~Han Youbo (Hui)~~, ~~Hui Kai (Manchu~~), Xie ~~Wenyan (Manchu)~~, ~~Tan Wenhua~~, Miao Disheng, Pan Xuexian, Yan ~~Fulong~~, Wei ~~Lidong~~, Jian Biao (Manchu)		
2018	13th	Yu Tianmin, Ma Xiaohong (female), Wang Liwei, Wang Li (female), Wang Zuoying (female), Wang Shangdian, Wang Yue (female, Hui), Wang Jiajuan (female), Wang Dejia, Zhi Yanru (female), Wen Guang (Mongolian), Tian Shuhuai, Bai Chunli (Manchu), Bai Xuefeng, Feng Yuping (female), Feng Yanling (female), Feng Shuling (female, Manchu), Lan Jianyong, Zhu Surong (female), Zhu Chaozhi (Manchu), Zhuang Yan (female), Liu Hong (female), Liu Hongyan (female, Mongolian), Liu Zheng, Liu Zhengkui, Guan Zhi'ou (Manchu), Mi Zhongyi (Hui), Xu Anbiao, Sun Yuanhua (female, Korean), Sun Dongming, Sun Zhihao, Sun Yi, Li Shiwei (Manchu), Li Tianshu, ~~Li Hezhong~~, Li Zongsheng, Li Chunjian, Li Guijie (female, Manchu), Li Jingyu (Manchu), Li Lu (female), Yang Song (female), Yang Zhonglin (Mongolian), Yang Xueming, Yang Jiechi, Yang Bin, Lai He (Mongolian), Xiao Shengfeng, Wu Yuliang, Wu Jinggeng (Mongolian), Wu Yanliang, Yu Gongbin,~~Zhang Shichao~~Zhang Chengzhong, Zhang Xuequn, Zhang Ke, Zhang Bainan, Zhang Yan (female, Manchu), Zhang Guiping (female), Zhang Guiqin (female), Zhang Haitao, Chen Qiufa (Miao), Chen Xiuyan (female), Chen Jian, Chen Jizhuang, Chen Wenfu, Wu Wenfei (female), Lin Yongzhong, Jin Jingzhe (Korean), Pang Hui (female), Guan Qijun (female, Manchu), Lang Kuiping, Meng Qinghai, Zhao Letao, Zhao Mingzhi (female, Manchu), Zhao Aijun,~~Hao Chunrong~~(Female), Liu Lei, Hou Manlu (female), Jiang Youwei, Li Shengrui (Manchu), Jia Wenqin (female), Xu Song, Gao Wei, Gao Chen (female), Gao Yingming (Manchu), Guo Kai, Guo Hongquan, Guo Lei, Tang Yijun, Tang Tingbo, Tu Dong, Lu Xindi, Han Qiuxiang (female, Manchu), Han Enhou, Xie Jinhong (female), Pei Weidong, Liao Jianyu, Tan Chengxu, Zhao Yingbin (female, Manchu), Pan Liguo, Dai Changbing, Dai Jishuang .		
2023	14th	Ding Xuexiang, Yu Dongxia, Ma Changhui, Ma Ying, Wang Aizhu, Wang Xiangming, Wang Jun, Wang Hongmei, Wang Zhixian, Wang Zhiqiang, Wang Libo, Wang Xiuying, Wang Qiyao, Wang Zhongkun, Wang Hui, Wang Jian, Wang Yue, Wang Ying, Ba Fang, Shi Hongbin, Fu Xiguo, Bai Ying, Xing Peng, Bi Chunguang, Lü Zhicheng, Ren Yongqiang, Zhuang Yan, Liu Hong, Liu Hongzhi, Liu Hongyan, Liu Xiuwen, Liu Guimei, Liu Mingjie, Liu Zhi, Sun Yuanhua, Sun Dongming, Sun Siyu, Sun Suyun, Ji Ruidong, Du Junqing, Li Wenbiao, Li Lecheng, Li Chi, Li Shengneng, Li Xiaoxia, Li Ziwei, Li Pengyu Yang Guanlin, Yang Chi, Yang Xueming, Yang Xiaochao, Yang Bin, Wu Shimin, Wu Kai, He Zhiyong, Tong Liang, Yu Miaojie, Zhang Lilin, Zhang Yamei, Zhang Jin, Zhang Lianyi, Zhang Yan, Zhang Xiaowen, Zhang Debin, Chen Xiangqun, Chen Shaowang, Ouyang Changqiong, Zhou Dayong, Zhou Pengju, Zheng Qing, Guan Qijun, Zhao Mingzhi, Hao Jianjun, Hao Peng, Hu Defang, Hou Jianguo, Jiang Xiaolin, Yao Huaming, Weng Jieming, Gao Jian, Gao Xin, Guo Qingli, Tang Lixin, Sheng Xiuling, Lu Xindi, Dong Tianren, Han Xuezhu, Han Qiuxiang, Xie Weidong, Xie Jingrong, Guan Xu, Tan Chengxu, Pan Shuang, Wang Xinwei	94	
