= Shanxi delegation to the National People's Congress =

Shanxi Delegation to the National People's Congress
- 全国人民代表大会山西省代表团
- Delegation for the National People's Congress
- Map showing the location of Shanxi Province
- Electoral unit: Shanxi Province
- Population: 34,915,616

Current Delegation
- Created: 1954
- Seats: 68
- Head of delegation: Lan Fo'an
- Provincial People's Congress: Shanxi Provincial People's Congress

The Shanxi delegation to the National People's Congress is a delegation composed of deputies representing Shanxi Province within the National People's Congress (NPC), the supreme organ of state power of the People's Republic of China. NPC deputies from the Shanxi Province are officially elected by the Shanxi Provincial People's Congress.

== List of deputies ==
Year	NPC sessions	Deputies	Number of deputies	Ref.
1954	1st	Wang Shiying, Wang Kaishan, Wang Guiying, Shen Jilan, Qu Yaoli, Wu Chun'an, Song Zichun, Li Shunda, Li Hui, Xin Anting, Wu Xinyu, Nan Hanchen, Hu Wenxiu, Ma Liuhai, Kang Yonghe, Zhang Daozhong, Zhang Jiafu, Cao Huanwen, Guo Yu'en, Guo Lanying, Tao Lujia, Lu Jingyun, Deng Chumin, Han Zhongren	24	
1959	2nd	Wang Shiying, Wang Guiying, Wang Shou, Deng Chumin, Shen Jilan (female), Du Qingyun, Li Shunda, Li Hui (female), Wu Xinyu, Yue Weifan, Zhao Daqing, Nan Hanchen, Hu Wenxiu (female), Ling Daqi, Gao Jincai, Gao Mingzhong, Ma Liuhai, Guo Lanying (female), Kang Yonghe, Jiao Guonai, Fu Zuoyi, Jia Baozhi, Yang Zixiu, Wei Heng	24	
1964	3rd	Yu Zaiji, Wei Heng, Ma Jie, Wang Xiulan, Wang Xingsheng, Wang Guiying, Wang Gongwu, Wang Shou, Wang Dehe, Deng Chumin, Feng Jiasheng, Shen Jilan, Shen Panwen, Tian Zhenzong, Tian Yuqi, Bai Tao, Liu Bangwen, Liu Yumin, Zhuang Guoshen, Xu Chuanheng, Zhu Wenhua, Zhu Changying, Ren Dali, Li Bu'e, Li Yinshan, Li Shunda, Li Suzhen, Li Hui, Yang Zixiu, Wu Waibao, Wu Jichang, Zhang Wanfu, Zhang Longzhi, Zhang Liankui Zhang Zhe, Zhang Jinyao, Chen Yonggui, Shao Xiangyi, Zheng Lin, Wu Xinyu, Yue Weifan, Zhou Mingshan, Zhao Shuli, Nan Hanchen, Hu Wenxiu, Hu Jingyun, Ling Daqi, Gao Qingchun, Gao Xiangshi, Gao Jincai, Guo Rixiu, Guo Lanying, Jia Baozhi, Xu Yinxiang, Tao Huanfu, Ji Pengfei, Kang Yonghe, Cao Subin, Chang Zhiqing, Chang Qiankun, Cheng Zihua, Fu Zuoyi, Lou Qinzong, Zang Cang, Pei Lisheng, Xiong Youzhen, Bo Yibo, Xue Yaolun	68	
1975	4th	Wang Shimin, Wang Daren, Wang Chuyu, Wang Yinge, Wang Dehe, Niu Fahe, Niu Guiying, Mao Lianshu, Zuo Fuguan, Shen Jilan, Feng Yifang, Xing Fulin, Lü Shuxiao, Zhu Junwei, Liu Kaiji, Sun Youzai, Du Xiufeng, Li Shengyi, Li Bingbi, Li Jinbo, Li Shunda, Li Gendang, Yang Zixiu, Yang Luqi, Yang Runsheng, Lu Jinzeng, Chen Yonggui, Chen Shangzhi, Chen Heidan, Shao Xiangyi, Wu Xiuzhen, Zhou Mingshan, Zhou Zhongye, Zheng Liuxiao, Hao Guangjie, Hu Wenxiu, Duan Linzhang, Hou Guobao, Jia Manhe, Jia Fugen, Ling Daqi, Gao Sishun, Guo Fenglian, Guo Ruyu, Guo Bujin, Xi Shengshu, Dong Xiuyu, Han Jinhua, Xie Shuanggui, Dou Xinchou, Chu Rongai, Cai Lijian, Huo Quanren, Ji Minxiu, Mu Xianlian	68	
1978	5th	Wang Daren, Wang Yunkang, Wang Xiulan, Wang Zudong, Wang Xiujin, Wang Qian, Niu Guiying, Deng Chumin, Zuo Fuguan, Shen Jilan, Tian Yuqi, Shi Zhengdao, Shi Huaibi, Feng Yifang, Qu Yusheng, Lü Shuxiao, Zhu Wenhua, Cheng Airong, Ren Huanchao, Liu Bangwen, Liu Chunchen, Liu Baisheng, Wen Buying, Xu Yunlan, Du Xiufeng, Li Kaiyuan, Li Jingquan, Li Shuxin, Li Baotian, Li Xishen, Li Dengxian, Yang Shanshan, Yang Runsheng, Yang Pin, Yang Deshui, Wu Jichang, Wu Pengzhu, Zhang Wanfu Zhang Longzhi, Zhang Jiafu, Zhang Zhenping, Chen Yonggui, Chen Youtang, Chen Xiuwen, Chen Xiyu, Chen Heidan, Shao Xiangyi, Wu Xinyu, Fan Qiang, Lin Chenggu, Zhou Zhongye, Qu Tianfu, Zhao Lizhi, Zhao Yueliang, Zhao Yuting, Zhao Xiumin, Duan Linzhang, Hou Wailu, Hou Qiulin, Xu Siyi, Yuan Renyuan, Yuan Meilian, Jia Qiaoxiang, Ling Daqi, Gao Xiangshi, Guo Fenglian, Guo Lanying, Guo Xiumei, Huang Yaorong, Cao Subin, Cui Yahe, Kang Yonghe, Jiang Shiyang, Cheng Zihua, Pan Yizheng, Mu Xianlian	76	
1983	6th	Ma Feng, Wang Erke, Wang Liangming, Wang Maolin, Wang Zudong, Wang Senhao, Wang Zengyou, Wang Zenghui, Qu Tangliang, Niu Yingguan, Niu Guiying, Kong Qinglin, Zuo Sheng, Shen Jilan, Tian Yuqi, Bai Xinghua, Feng Hongzhang, Feng Zemin, Xing Yimin, Shi Huixi, Qu Yusheng, Zhong Jixue, Liu Guangrui, Liu Jiyuan, Liu Jingqing, Guan Qiao, Xu Yushan, Ruan Bosheng, Li Yiqing, Li Jiyin, Li Yungan, Li Li, Li Xueqian, Li Xiuren, Li Jingping Yang Shanshan, Yang Pin, Wu Songgang, Song Shaowen, Song Mouyang, Zhang Wanfu, Zhang Guangjian, Zhang Hefeng, Zhang Xinglan, Zhang Jie, Lu Wenxiong, Chen Tianyuan, Chen Jiexin, Chen Shuhua, Chen Huibo, Chen Heidan, Lin Chenggu, Lin Feng, Luo Guibo, Zhao Qingxiang, Zhao Xiumin, Hu Wenxiu, Hu Shunzhi, Qin Lisheng, Qian Xuepu, Gao Zhongli, Guo Lanying, Guo Peiru, Huang Huanying, Jiang Shiyang, Fu Changwang, Jiao Guonai, Xie Renzhi, Xie Jinbao, Pan Yizheng	70	
1988	7th	Diao Wenlan, Wan Shouheng, Ma Hong, Ma Feng, Ma Cuizhen, Wang Tingdong, Wang Senhao, Niu Guiying, Mao Weidong, Kang Longtian, Zuo Sheng, Shen Jilan, Bai Feng, Bai Qingcai, Feng Hongzhang, Feng Chunli, Feng Zemin, Xing Yimin, Cheng Zhiping, Bi Shengcai, Zhu Lihou, Zhong Jixue, Ren Jianxin, Ren Changxiu, Ruan Bosheng, Sun Ying, Du Daozheng, Du Bilan, Li Ziying, Li Hongxing, Li Yungan, Li Xueqian, Li Chunlin, Li Jinbiao, Li Jingping Li Daoxing, Yang Shiqi, Yang Shanshan, Zhang Guangjian, Zhang Kunmao, Zhang Ting, Zhang Guifu, Zhang Jianmin, Zhang Sai, Lu Wenxiong, Chen Zijing, Chen Rixin, Chen Jiexin, Chen Shunli, Miao Hunman, Lin Chenggu, Luo Xiuhui, Zhou Yihe, Zhao Shengcai, Hao Liping, Hu Shunzhi, Yuan Gao, Jin Hui, Xu Shengwang, Gao Zhongli, Guo Budian, Xi Zhongyi, Hai Yumei, Huang Huanying, Chang Guiming, Yan Wuhong, Liang Jixiang, Xie Jinbao, Lian Nengzhi, Bo Yibo		
1993	8th	Ma Cuizhen, Wang Tingdong, Mao Weidong, Wu Jie, Kang Longtian, Zuo Sheng, Lu Gongxun, Shen Jilan, Tian Guilan, Bai Feng, Feng Qifu, Cheng Zhiping, Zhu Lihou, Zhong Jixue, Ren Jianxin, Ren Jilin, Ren Genxin, Liu Runlai, Liu Rongfen, Guan Cunxian, Jiang Ming, Li Ziying, Li Shuangliang, Li Ligong, Li Yunqian, Li Xueqian, Li Zhenwu, Yang Shanshan, Lai Jinlie, Wu Ang, Zhang Bangying, Zhang Guangjian, Zhang Zeyu, Zhang Ting, Zhang Kui Zhang Binyan, Zhang Sai, Chen Shunli, Tai Aiguo, Jin Xiaomei, Zhou Yihe, Zhou Qiufang, Zhou Suying, Zheng Shekui, Meng Weizai, Zhao Shengcai, Zhao Xuemei, Zhao Guifa, Zhao Xiaoying, Hao Zhuren, Hu Fuguo, Hou Xiaobao, Yuan Gao, Ling Daqi, Gao Zhongli, Guo Budian, Guo Baolin, Xi Zhongyi, Cao Jinghui, Chang Guiming, Chang Chongxuan, Liang Jixiang, Liang Hongfei, Dong Qinjun, Cheng Buyun, Xie Jinbao, Xue Jun, Huo Hongyi, Wei Yunyu		
1998	9th	Ma Qiaozhen, Ma Linfeng, Wang Yiming (Hui nationality), Wang Shuming, Wang Yutian, Wang Jiren, Wang Mengfei, Wang Xueping, Wang Yuesheng, Kang Longtian, Lu Gongxun, Lu Jincheng, Shen Jilan, Shen Weichen, Shen Lianbin, Tian Chengping, Tian Guilan, Feng Qifu, Park Yong-cheol (Korean nationality), Qu Huimin, Zhu Lihou, Zhong Jixue, Ren Jianxin, Sun Wensheng, Du Wu'an, Du Yulin, Li Dadong, Li Shuangliang, Li Ligong, Li Yingming, Li Zhensheng, Li Zhenwu, Yang Zixuan Lai Yulong, Lai Jinlie, Wu Juxian, Zhang Bangying, Zhang Guangyu, Zhang Guoxiang, Zhang Kui, Zhang Junlin, Chen Pengfei, Ou Xuelian, Zhou Peiyu, Zhou Manxiang, Zheng Yousan, Zheng Jianbang, Zhao Jie, Zhao Jianzhen, Zhao Xiaoying, Zhao Suoxiang, Hu Fuguo, Duan Liqing, Yao Qihui, Qin Xiao, Geng Genxi, Gao Yuwen, Huang Youquan, Cao Zhonghou, Cao Fucheng, Liang Guoying, Liang Yingguang, Liang Yuqin, Peng Chi, Dong Jianzhao, Han Chang'an, Cheng Mingyuan, Tan Huasheng, Wei Deqing		
2003	10th	Wei Xiaochun, Ma Xiaoping (Hui), Ma Qiaozhen (female), Ma Linfeng (female), Wang Yutian (female), Wang Shouzhen, Wang Guozheng, Wang Xin (female), Wang Xiaolin, Wang Xueping (female), Wang Yuesheng, Wang Ya'an, Wang Xinxian, Wang Yuzhong, Lu Gongxun, Shen Jilan (female), Shen Lianbin, Tian Chengping, Zhu Lijun (Manchu), Zhu Lihou (female), Liu Zhenya, Liu Zhenhua, Xu Jianmin, Sun Zhaoxue, Sun Fuzhi, Ji Xinfang, Du Fuxin, Li Dadong, Li Yuzhen, Li Yingming, Li Guohua (female), Li Ronghuai, Li Yuanchao, Yang Mu Zhi, Yang Gengyu, Yang Meixi, Xiao Yang, Wu Juxian (female), Zhang Bingsheng, Zhang Huaiwen, Zhang Cheng, Zhang Jianxin (female), Zhang Kui, Zhang Junlin, Zhang Gaoyong, Chen Dahao, Chen Chuanping, Chen Pengfei, Luo Jinbao, Zheng Jianbang, Zhao Xiaoying (female), Hu Weiping, Duan Zhiai (female), Duan Liqing (female), Yuan Yuzhu, Guo Fenglian (female), Guo Shuangwei, Guo Liangxiao, Guo Guichun, Guo Hailiang, Guo Xinzhi (female), Yan Huazheng, Yan Qinsheng, Liang Yuqin (female), Sui Yunsheng, Peng Jianxun, Han Chang'an, Han Yaqin (female), Fan Jiheng		
2008	11th	Ma Xiaoping (Hui nationality), Ma Qiaozhen (female), Ma Linfeng (female), Ma Kai, Feng Lixiang, Wang Ning, Wang Maoshe, Wang Yuesheng, Wang Shuzhen (female), Zuo Shizhong, Shi Taifeng, Ye Jingliang, Shen Jilan (female), Shen Lianbin, Shen Ruitao (female), Tian Xirong, Bai Yun (female), Bai Jingfu, Liu Ronghua (female), Xu Yuegang, Ji Xinfang, Du Yulin, Du Shanxue, Li Li, Li Wuzhang, Li Qingshan, Li Xiaobo, Li Yue'e (female), Li Zhanghong, Yang Anhe, Yang Gengyu, Yang Meixi, Wu Yongping, Shen Jianjun (female), Zhang Shaoqin, Zhang Bingsheng, Zhang Baoshun, Zhang Zhongning, Zhang Fuming, Zhang Genhu, Zhang Jiasheng, Zhang Chonghui, Zhang Pu, Chen Guorong, Wu Xun, Zheng Jianguo, Lang Sheng, Meng Xuenong, Zhao Lixin (female), Zhao Huashan, Hu Weiping, Hu Suping (female), Ke Hanmin, Liu Shulin, Yuan Yuzhu, Geng Huaiying, Li Junping, Xia Zhengui, Gao Weidong, Guo Fenglian (female), Guo Shuangwei, Guo Xinzhi (female), Liang Heng, Dong Hongyun, Dong Changsheng, Han Chang'an, Han Yaqin (female), Xie Hong (female), Xie Kechang		
2013	12th	~~Ding Xuefeng~~, Ma Kai, Ma Ruiyan (female), Wang Yunlong, Wang Anpang, Wang Runmei (female), Wang Qingxian, Zuo Shizhong, Shi, Shen Jilan (female), Shen Lianbin, Shen Ruitao (female), Bai Yonghong (female), Linghu An, Zhu Xiaoming, Ren Wuxian, Liu Jie, Liu Jianzhong, Liu Zhensuo, Liu Ronghua (female), Li Li, Li Xiaopeng, Li Wuzhang, Li Zhengwen, Li Dongliang, Li Qiuxi, Li Jinping,LiXiaobo, Li Ruifeng,Yang Si, Yang Linhua (female), Yang Gengyu, Yang Shaoqing, Wu Qinghai, Xin Yan (female), Shen Jianjun (female), Zhang Shaoqin, Zhang Ping, Zhang Hongjian (female), ~~Zhang Jiasheng~~, Yue Puyi, ~~Jin Daoming (Manchu~~)Zheng Liansheng, Zhao Lixin (female), Hu Suping (female), Xiang Libin, Liu Shulin, Yao Jianmin, ~~Yuan Yuzhu~~, Yuan Chunqing, Geng Yanbo, Li Cuitian, Jia Aiqin (female), Jia Suotang, Gao Jianmin, Guo Fenglian (female), Guo Xinzhi (female), Chang Junmin, Yan Shaoquan (female), Dong Lin, Dong Dong (Hui nationality), Han Chang'an, Xie Hong (female), Lian Yimin, Xiong Jijun, Pan Junfeng		
2018	13th	Wei Xiaochun, Ma Ruiyan (female), Wang Wenbao, Wang Liwei, Wang Cheng, Wang Jinnan,~~Wang Junbiao~~Wang Runmei (female), Wang Juanling (female), Wang Yali (female), Niu Sanping, Shuang Shaomin (female), Gu Xiaoyu, Shen Jilan (female), Tian Yongdong, Cong Bin, Feng Bing (Hui nationality), Feng Jun, Xing Limin, Lü Chunxiang, Zhu Xiaodong, Ren Jianhua, Liu Yuqiang, Liu Zheng, Liu Zhihong, Liu Hongxin, Liu Feng, Liu He, Xu Xiaohong (female), Sun Tao, Li Zhiqiang, Li Chunsheng, Li Qiuxi~~Li Jinping~~Li Guiqin (female), Yang Linhua (female), Yang Zhenwu, Yang Jinghai, Yang Qinrong, Yang Rong (female), Wu Heng, Qiu Shuiping, Xin Yan (female), Zhang Hongxiang, Zhang Jianguo, Chen Zhenliang, Wu Hongwen, Wu Tao, Zheng Liansheng, Zhao Lixin (female), Zhao Chunlei, Hao Xu, Hu Yuting, Jiang Siqing, Yao Wujiang, Luo Huining, Li Cuitian, Jia Zhangke, Gao Bingwei, Gao Jianmin, Gao Xiangming, Guo Fenglian (female), Guo Yingguang, Huang Qingxue, Yan Shaoquan (female), Yan Meirong (female), Dong Lin, Lou Yangsheng, Lei Jiankun (female), Chu Xuliang		
2023	14th	Wei Xiaochun, Ma Jinlian, Ma Tonggui, Wang Fei, Wang Dongming, Wang Yongjun, Wang Zhengtao, Wang Jingang, Wang Runmei, Wang Juanling, Wang Yali, Shuang Shaomin, Bai Qirui, Feng Jun, Lü Chunxiang, Zhu Shaohui, Zhu Mingchun, Liu Wenhua, Liu Zheng, Xu Lianhong, Li Yunfeng, Li Lili, Li Guobiao, Li Jianguo, Li Yong, Li Hui, Li Huiyi, Yang Xiaojing, Yang Jinghai, Yang Rong, Wu Xiuling, Zou Ming, Xin Yan Zhang Guangyong, Zhang Shili, Zhang Jifu, Zhang Linshan, Zhang Qiang, Zhang Xinwei, Chen Erdong, Chen Xiaoshuan, Wu Yi, Fan Yinlian, Hang Kan, Luo Qingyu, Zhao Lixin, Zhao Jianguo, Zhao Haiying, Hao Chisheng, Hu Zhanjun, Yuan Shuhong, Guo Fenglian, Sheng Genghong, Chang Shuming, Chang Guohua, Cui Lizhi, Yan Meirong, Peng Jinhui, Chu Xianghao, Tong Mingquan, Lan Fo'an, Lei Maoduan, Xie Jun, Xue Mingyao, Tang Dengjie	68	
