= List of National People's Congress terms =

Terms of the National People's Congress of the People's Republic of China include:

- 1st National People's Congress, from 1954 to 1959
- 2nd National People's Congress, from 1959 to 1964
- 3rd National People's Congress, from 1964 to 1975
- 4th National People's Congress, from 1975 to 1978
- 5th National People's Congress, from 1978 to 1983
- 6th National People's Congress, from 1983 to 1988
- 7th National People's Congress, from 1988 to 1993
- 8th National People's Congress, from 1993 to 1998
- 9th National People's Congress, from 1998 to 2003
- 10th National People's Congress, from 2003 to 2008
- 11th National People's Congress, from 2008 to 2013
- 12th National People's Congress, from 2013 to 2018
- 13th National People's Congress, from 2018 to 2023
- 14th National People's Congress (current), from 2023 to 2028
