= He Chunlin =

Chinese politician

- 何椿霖

Director of the Credentials Committee of the National People's Congress
- In office 26 April 2003 – 24 April 2008
- Chairperson: Wu Bangguo
- Preceded by: Wang Weicheng
- Succeeded by: Huang Zhendong

Director of the National People's Congress Supervisory and Judicial Affairs Committee
- In office March 2003 – March 2008
- Chairperson: Wu Bangguo
- Preceded by: Hou Zongbin
- Succeeded by: Huang Zhendong

Secretary-General of the National People's Congress
- In office 5 March 1998 – 5 March 2003
- Chairperson: Li Peng
- Preceded by: Cao Zhi
- Succeeded by: Sheng Huaren

Personal details
- Born: August 1933 (age 93) Wuxi County, Jiangsu, China
- Party: Chinese Communist Party
- Education: Northeast Agricultural University

He Chunlin (Chinese: 何椿霖; pinyin: Hé Chūnlín; born August 1933) is a Chinese politician who served as secretary-general of the National People's Congress from 1998 to 2003, director of the National People's Congress Supervisory and Judicial Affairs Committee and director of the Credentials Committee of the National People's Congress from 2003 to 2008.

He was a member of the Standing Committee of the 9th and 10th National People's Congress. He was a member of the 14th and 15th Central Committee of the Chinese Communist Party.

== Biography ==
He was born in Wuxi County, Jiangsu, in August 1933. He joined the Chinese Communist Party (CCP) in March 1951. He graduated from Northeast Agricultural University. Starting in 1957, he successively served as technician, engineer, deputy section chief, and section chief of the Agricultural Mechanization Research Institute of the Chinese Academy of Agricultural Sciences, interspersed with two years in May Seventh Cadre Schools in Yilan County, Heilongjiang and then Changde, Hunan from 1968 to 1970.

He was deputy director of Science and Technology Department of the Agricultural Mechanization Research Institute of the First Ministry of Machine Building in 1972, and held that office until 1978. After his short term as deputy head of the Research Group of the Office of the Leading Group for Agricultural Mechanization of the State Council, he was appointed director of the Comprehensive Department of the Research Office of the Ministry of Agricultural Machinery in 1979, and one year later became head of the General Office and director of Research Room. In 1982, he was despatched to the State Council, becoming head of Special Zone Working Group of the General Office in 1982 and director of the Office of Special Economic Zones in 1984. He also served as deputy secretary-general of the State Council from May 1988 to March 1998. In March 1998, he was chosen as secretary-general of the National People's Congress, he remained in that position until March 2003, when he took office as director of the National People's Congress Supervisory and Judicial Affairs Committee. He also served as director of the Credentials Committee of the National People's Congress from April 2003 to April 2008.

Assembly seats
Preceded by Cao Zhi	Secretary-General of the National People's Congress; 1998–2003	Succeeded by Sheng Huaren
Preceded by Hou Zongbin	Chairperson of the National People's Congress Supervisory and Judicial Affairs Committee; 2003–2008	Succeeded by Huang Zhendong
Preceded by Wang Weicheng	Director of the Credentials Committee of the National People's Congress; 2003–2008	Succeeded by Huang Zhendong
