= Supervisory and Judicial Affairs Committee =

Committee of the National People's Congress in People's Republic of China

- 全国人民代表大会宪法和法律委员会
- Abbreviation: (全国人大监察和司法委员会)
- Formation: March 1988
- Type: Special committee of the National People's Congress
- Legal status: Active
- Location: Beijing
- Chairperson: Yang Xiaochao
- Parent organization: National People's Congress; Standing Committee of the National People's Congress (when the NPC is not in session)

The Supervisory and Judicial Affairs Committee of the National People's Congress (Chinese: 全国人民代表大会监察和司法委员会; pinyin: Quánguó Rénmín Dàibiǎo Dàhuì Jiānchá Hé Sĩfǎ Wěiyuánhuì) is one of ten special committees of the National People's Congress, the national legislature of the People's Republic of China.

== History ==
The special committee was created as the Internal and Judicial Affairs Committee of the National People's Congress during the first session of the 7th National People's Congress in March 1988, and has existed for every National People's Congress since. it was renamed to the Supervisory and Judicial Affairs Committee in as part of the deepening the reform of the Party and state institutions.

== Chairpersons ==
| Congress | Chairperson | Vice-chairpersons |
|---|---|---|
| 7th National People's Congress | Xi Zhongxun | |
| 8th National People's Congress | Meng Liankun (孟连崑) | |
| 9th National People's Congress | Hou Zongbin (侯宗宾) | |
| 10th National People's Congress | He Chunlin (何椿霖) | |
| 11th National People's Congress | Huang Zhendong | |
| 12th National People's Congress | Ma Wen | Bai Jingfu, Wang Yifu (汪毅夫), Deng Changyou, Qin Guangrong, Li Shenming (李慎明), Chen Xiurong (陈秀榕), Wang Shengming (王胜明), Su Hui (苏辉), He Yehui (何晔晖) |
| 13th National People's Congress | Wu Yuliang | Wang Jiaocheng, Zhang Sujun (张苏军), Wang Shengming (王胜明), Xu Xianming, Han Xiaowu (韩晓武), Li Yuefeng (李钺锋), Li Wei (李伟), Liu Haixing (刘海星), Gao Youdong (高友东) |
| 14th National People's Congress | Yang Xiaochao | |

== See also ==
- Committee for Social and Legal Affairs, CPPCC NC counterpart
