= Wang Tao (politician) =

Chinese politician (1931–2025)

- 王涛

General Manager of the China National Petroleum Corporation
- In office 1989 – December 1996
- Preceded by: New title
- Succeeded by: Zhou Yongkang

General Manager of the China Petrochemical Corporation
- In office 1988–1989
- Preceded by: Chen Jinhua
- Succeeded by: Sheng Huaren

Minister of Petroleum Industry
- In office June 1985 – April 1988
- Premier: Zhao Ziyang; Li Peng
- Preceded by: Tang Ke
- Succeeded by: Position abolished

Personal details
- Born: November 1931 Huaide County, Jilin, China
- Died: 22 May 2025 (aged 93) Beijing, China
- Party: Chinese Communist Party
- Education: Northeastern University; Jilin University; Sverdlovsk Mining Institute

Chinese name
- Simplified Chinese: 王涛
- Traditional Chinese: 王濤
Transcriptions
Standard Mandarin
- Hanyu Pinyin: Wáng Tāo

Wang Tao (Chinese: 王涛; November 1931 – 22 May 2025) was a Chinese executive and politician who served as minister of petroleum industry from 1985 to 1988, general manager of the China Petrochemical Corporation from 1988 to 1989, and general manager of the China National Petroleum Corporation from 1989 to 1996.

Wang was a member of the 12th, 13th, and 14th Central Committee of the Chinese Communist Party. He was a member of the Standing Committee of the 9th National People's Congress.

== Life and career ==
Wang was born in Huaide County (now Gongzhuling), Jilin in November 1931, while his ancestral home is in Laoting County, Hebei. He joined the Chinese Communist Party (CCP) in December 1948. In 1952, he was admitted to Northeast Institute of Technology (now Northeastern University) and then studied at Changchun Institute of Geology (now Jilin University). After studying Russian in Beijing Russian Special School for a year in 1954, he was sent to study at Sverdlovsk Mining Institute, where he received his vice-doctorate degree in 1963.

Starting in 1963, he successively served as an intern of the Exploration Office of Beijing Academy of Petroleum Sciences, intern of Daqing Oil Field Development Research Institute, director of the Exploration Office of Beijing Academy of Petroleum Sciences, deputy chief commander and chief geologist of Dagang Oil Field, deputy director and chief geologist of Liaohe Petroleum Exploration Bureau, leader in charge of the Leading Group of the Pearl River Estuary Preparation Office of the South China Sea Petroleum Exploration Headquarters, and general manager of CNOOC South China Sea East Oil Company.

In June 1986, he was promoted to become minister of petroleum industry, a position he held until April 1988. He was general manager of the China Petrochemical Corporation in 1988, but having held the position for only a year. In 1989, he became general manager of the China National Petroleum Corporation, a post he kept until December 1996.

In March 1998, he took office as vice chairperson of the National People's Congress Environment Protection and Resources Conservation Committee. Wang died in Beijing on 22 May 2025, at the age of 93.

Government offices
Preceded by Tang Ke	Minister of Petroleum Industry; 1985–1988	Succeeded by Position abolished
Business positions
Preceded by Chen Jinhua	General Manager of the China Petrochemical Corporation; 1988–1989	Succeeded by Sheng Huaren
New title	General Manager of the China National Petroleum Corporation; 1989–1996	Succeeded by Zhou Yongkang
