= 10th National People's Congress =

2003–2008 Chinese legislative session

10th National People's Congress 第十届全国人民代表大会
- National emblem of China

5 March 2003 – 5 March 2008 (5 years, 0 days) Overview
- Type: Supreme organ of state power
- Election: Indirect elections

Leadership
- Chairman: Wu Bangguo
- Vice Chairmen: Wang Zhaoguo, Li Tieying, Ismail Amat, He Luli, Ding Shisun, Cheng Siwei, Xu Jialu, Jiang Zhenghua, Gu Xiulian, Raidi, Sheng Huaren, Lu Yongxiang, Uyunqimg, Han Qide, and Michael Fu Tieshan
- Secretary-General: Sheng Huaren
- Standing Committee: 175 (10th)

Members
- Total: 2,985 members

10th National People's Congress
- Traditional Chinese: 第十屆全國人民代表大會
- Simplified Chinese: 第十届全国人民代表大会
Transcriptions
Standard Mandarin
- Hanyu Pinyin: Dìshí Jiè Quánguó Rénmín Dàibiǎo Dàhuì
- Wade–Giles: Ti4-shih2 Chieh4 Chʻüan2-kuo2 Jên2-min2 Tai4-piao3 Ta4-hui4

Abbreviation
- Traditional Chinese: 第十屆全國人大
- Simplified Chinese: 第十届全国人大
Transcriptions
Standard Mandarin
- Hanyu Pinyin: Dìshí Jiè Quánguó Réndà

The 10th National People's Congress (NPC) was in session from 2003 to 2008. It held five plenary sessions in this period. There were 2,984 deputies to this Congress. It succeeded the 9th National People's Congress.

== Seat distribution ==
| Major party | General Secretary | Seats |
|---|---|---|
| Chinese Communist Party | Hu Jintao | 2,178 |
| Other Parties | Chairperson | Seats |
| Chinese Peasants' and Workers' Democratic Party | Jiang Zhenghua | 480 |
| Jiusan Society | Han Qide | 480 |
| China Democratic League | Ding Shisun; Jiang Shusheng | 480 |
| China Association for Promoting Democracy | Xu Jialu | 480 |
| China National Democratic Construction Association | Cheng Siwei | 480 |
| Revolutionary Committee of the Chinese Kuomintang | He Luli | 480 |
| Taiwan Democratic Self-Government League | Zhang Kehui; Lin Wenyi | 480 |
| China Zhi Gong Party | Luo Haocai | 480 |
| Independents | N/A | 480 |

== Organization ==
=== Council of Chairpersons ===
| | | Party | Term |
|---|---|---|---|
| Chairman | Wu Bangguo | CCP | 15 Mar. 2003 – 15 Mar. 2008 |
| Vice Chairpersons | Wang Zhaoguo | CCP | 15 Mar. 2003 – 15 Mar. 2008 |
| Vice Chairpersons | Li Tieying | CCP | 15 Mar. 2003 – 15 Mar. 2008 |
| Vice Chairpersons | Ismail Amat | CCP | 15 Mar. 2003 – 15 Mar. 2008 |
| Vice Chairpersons | He Luli | RCCK | 15 Mar. 2003 – 15 Mar. 2008 |
| Vice Chairpersons | Ding Shisun | CDL | 15 Mar. 2003 – 15 Mar. 2008 |
| Vice Chairpersons | Cheng Siwei | CNDCA | 15 Mar. 2003 – 15 Mar. 2008 |
| Vice Chairpersons | Xu Jialu | CAPD | 15 Mar. 2003 – 15 Mar. 2008 |
| Vice Chairpersons | Jiang Zhenghua | CPWDP | 15 Mar. 2003 – 15 Mar. 2008 |
| Vice Chairpersons | Gu Xiulian | CCP | 15 Mar. 2003 – 15 Mar. 2008 |
| Vice Chairpersons | Raidi | CCP | 15 Mar. 2003 – 15 Mar. 2008 |
| Vice Chairpersons | Sheng Huaren | CCP | 15 Mar. 2003 – 15 Mar. 2008 |
| Vice Chairpersons | Lu Yongxiang | CCP | 15 Mar. 2003 – 15 Mar. 2008 |
| Vice Chairpersons | Uyunqimg | CCP | 15 Mar. 2003 – 15 Mar. 2008 |
| Vice Chairpersons | Han Qide | JS | 15 Mar. 2003 – 15 Mar. 2008 |
| Vice Chairpersons | Michael Fu Tieshan | Ind. | 15 Mar. 2003 – 15 Mar. 2008 |
| Secretary-General | Sheng Huaren | CCP | 15 Mar. 2003 – 15 Mar. 2008 |

=== Special Committees ===
| Special committee | Chairperson |
|---|---|
| Ethnic Affairs Committee | Doje Cering |
| Law Committee | Yang Jingyu |
| Internal and Judicial Affairs Committee | He Chunlin |
| Financial and Economic Affairs Committee | Fu Zhihuan |
| Education, Science, Culture and Public Health Committee | Zhu Lilan |
| Foreign Affairs Committee | Jiang Enzhu |
| Overseas Chinese Affairs Committee | Chen Guangyi |
| Environment Protection and Resources Conservation Committee | Mao Rubai |
| Agriculture and Rural Affairs Committee | Liu Mingzu |

== The first Session ==
The Congress held its first plenary session from March 5–18, 2003 at the Great Hall of the People in Beijing.

=== Election results ===
Elections to the Congress were held from October 2002 to February 2003, the first including deputies representing Macau. These deputies elected the following:

| Presidential Election | | | | Vice-Presidential Election | | | |
| Candidates | For | Against | Abstain | Candidates | For | Against | Abstain |
|---|---|---|---|---|---|---|---|
| Hu Jintao | 2,937 | 4 | 3 | Zeng Qinghong | 2,578 | 177 | 190 |
| CMC Chairmanship Election | | | | Premiership Nomination | | | |
| Candidates | For | Against | Abstain | Candidates | For | Against | Abstain |
| Jiang Zemin | 2,726 | 98 | 122 | Wen Jiabao | 2,906 | 3 | 16 |

== The second Session ==
The Congress held its second annual meeting from March 5–14, 2004 at the Great Hall of the People in Beijing.

== The third Session ==
The Congress held its third annual meeting from March 5–14, 2005 at the Great Hall of the People in Beijing.

== The fourth Session ==
The Congress held its fourth annual meeting from March 5–15, 2006 at the Great Hall of the People in Beijing.

== The fifth Session ==
The Congress held its fifth annual meeting from March 5 to March 15, 2007, at the Great Hall of the People in Beijing.
