= 9th National People's Congress =

1998–2003 Chinese legislative session

9th National People's Congress 第九届全国人民代表大会
- National emblem of China

5 March 1998 – 5 March 2003 (5 years, 0 days) Overview
- Type: Supreme organ of state power
- Election: Indirect elections

Leadership
- Chairman: Li Peng
- Vice Chairmen: Tian Jiyun, Xie Fei, Jiang Chunyun, Zou Jiahua, Pagbalha Geleg Namgyai, Wang Guangying, Cheng Siyuan, Buhe, Tömür Dawamat, Wu Jieping, Peng Peiyun, He Luli, Zhou Guangzhao, Cheng Kejie, Cao Zhi, Ding Shisun, Cheng Siwei, Xu Jialu, and Jiang Zhenghua
- Secretary-General: He Chunlin
- Standing Committee: 155 (9th)

Members
- Total: 2,979 members

9th National People's Congress
- Traditional Chinese: 第九屆全國人民代表大會
- Simplified Chinese: 第九届全国人民代表大会
Transcriptions
Standard Mandarin
- Hanyu Pinyin: Dìjiǔ Jiè Quánguó Rénmín Dàibiǎo Dàhuì
- Wade–Giles: Ti4-shih2 Chieh4 Chʻüan2-kuo2 Jên2-min2 Tai4-piao3 Ta4-hui4

Abbreviation
- Traditional Chinese: 第九屆全國人大
- Simplified Chinese: 第九届全国人大
Transcriptions
Standard Mandarin
- Hanyu Pinyin: Dìjiǔ Jiè Quánguó Réndà

The 9th National People's Congress (NPC) was in session from 1998 to 2003 across five plenary sessions. It followed the final session of the 8th National People's Congress. There were 2,979 deputies to this Congress.

== Background ==
This was the first congress in which deputies were elected representing the Hong Kong SAR and the new directly administered city of Chongqing.

Elections were held from October 1997 to February 1998 by the 22 provincial and 5 autonomous regional legislatures, as well as the city legislatures of the four directly administered municipalities, which elected their deputies to the NPC.

== Seat distribution ==
Major party	General Secretary	Seats
Chinese Communist Party	Jiang Zemin	2,130
Other Parties	Chairperson	Seats
Chinese Peasants' and Workers' Democratic Party	Jiang Zhenghua	460
Jiusan Society	Wu Jieping	460
China Democratic League	Ding Shisun	460
China Association for Promoting Democracy	Xu Jialu	460
China National Democratic Construction Association	Cheng Siwei	460
Revolutionary Committee of the Chinese Kuomintang	He Luli	460
Taiwan Democratic Self-Government League	Zhang Kehui	460
China Zhi Gong Party	Luo Haocai	460
Independents	N/A	460

== The first session ==
=== Elected state leaders ===
- President of the People's Republic of China: Jiang Zemin
- Chairman of the Standing Committee of the National People's Congress: Li Peng
- Premier of the State Council: Zhu Rongji
- Chairman of the Central Military Commission: Jiang Zemin
- President of the Supreme People's Court: Xiao Yang
- Procurator-General of the Supreme People's Procuratorate: Han Zhubin

== The second session ==
The 1999 amendment to the Constitution of China were adopted by on March 15, 1999.

The People's Liberation Army budget increased 12.8% in 1999 compared to the prior year, marking the Congress' continued interest in military modernization.
