= Streptomyces inhibens =

Scientific classification
- Domain: Bacteria
- Kingdom: Bacillati
- Phylum: Actinomycetota
- Class: Actinomycetia
- Order: Streptomycetales
- Family: Streptomycetaceae
- Genus: Streptomyces
- Species: S. inhibens

Binomial name
- Streptomyces inhibens Jin et al. 2019

Type strain
- NEAU-D10

Species of bacterium

Streptomyces inhibens is a bacterium species from the genus of Streptomyces which has been isolated from rhizospheric soil of a wheat plant (Triticum aestivum L.) from the Northeast Agricultural University.

== See also ==
- List of Streptomyces species
