= 1999 amendment to the Constitution of China =

Amendment to the Constitution of the People's Republic of China

National People's Congress
- Territorial extent: China
- Passed by: National People's Congress
- Passed: 15 March 1999
- Effective: 15 March 1999

Codification
- Acts amended: Constitution of the People's Republic of China
- Introduced by: Standing Committee of the National People's Congress
- Voting summary: 2,811 voted for; 21 voted against; 24 abstained
- Status: In force

The Amendment to the Constitution of the People's Republic of China was proposed by the 15th Central Committee of the Chinese Communist Party and adopted at the second session of the 9th National People's Congress on 15 March 1999.

The amendments incorporated Deng Xiaoping Theory to the constitution and expanded the role of private enterprises.

== History ==
On January 22, the CCP Central Committee submitted the “Proposal of the Central Committee of the Chinese Communist Party on Amending Part of the Constitution” to the Standing Committee of the National People's Congress. On January 30, the seventh session of the Standing Committee of the 9th National People's Congress passed the "Draft Constitutional Amendment" based on the central government's constitutional amendment proposal, and decided to submit it to the second session of the 9th National People's Congress for deliberation. On March 15, the second session of the 9th National People's Congress passed the Constitutional Amendment with 2,811 votes in favor, 21 votes against, and 24 abstentions.

== Amendments ==
The amendments incorporated Deng Xiaoping Theory to the constitution. The revised Constitution further improved the status of private enterprises and abolished the clause of "counter-revolutionary crimes". In addition, it added: "The People's Republic of China shall implement the rule of law and build a socialist country under the rule of law."
