= Wuxi No. 1 High School =

School in Wuxi, China

Wuxi No. 1 High School (Chinese: 无锡市第一中学; pinyin: Wúxī Shì Dìyī Zhōngxué) is a Chinese school. It is located in Wuxi, Jiangsu Province, People's Republic of China. Wuxi No. 1 High School is the seventh-best school in Jiangsu Province (Chinese National Higher Education Entrance Examination).

== History ==
The school was built in 1911. It was called "Five Charming Roses among the High Schools in Jiangsu" along with other four schools, namely High School Affiliated to Nanjing Normal University, Suzhou High School, Nantong Middle School of Jiangsu Province and Changzhou High School.

== Programs ==
The school's International department has operated since 2008. It has an International Baccalaureate Diploma Programme (set up in 2011) and A Level courses. It also has a College board Advanced PlacementCenter, Cambridge International Examinations center and is one of the few public school authorized by International Baccalaureate in China. The advanced international education makes the school famous in China. Its graduates have attended the University of Pennsylvania, Cornell University, University of Cambridge, University of Oxford, University of Chicago, UCLA, UCBerkeley, NYU, Swarthmore College, University of Hong Kong University of Tokyo and LSE. The IB diploma department now has Chinese A, English B, Mathematics, Further Math, Biology, Chemistry, Physics, History, Economics, Visual Arts and Music. In a 2016 ranking the school ranked 38th in China on the number of students entering top American universities.
