= Cheng Siwei =

Chinese economist (1935–2015)

Cheng Siwei 成思危
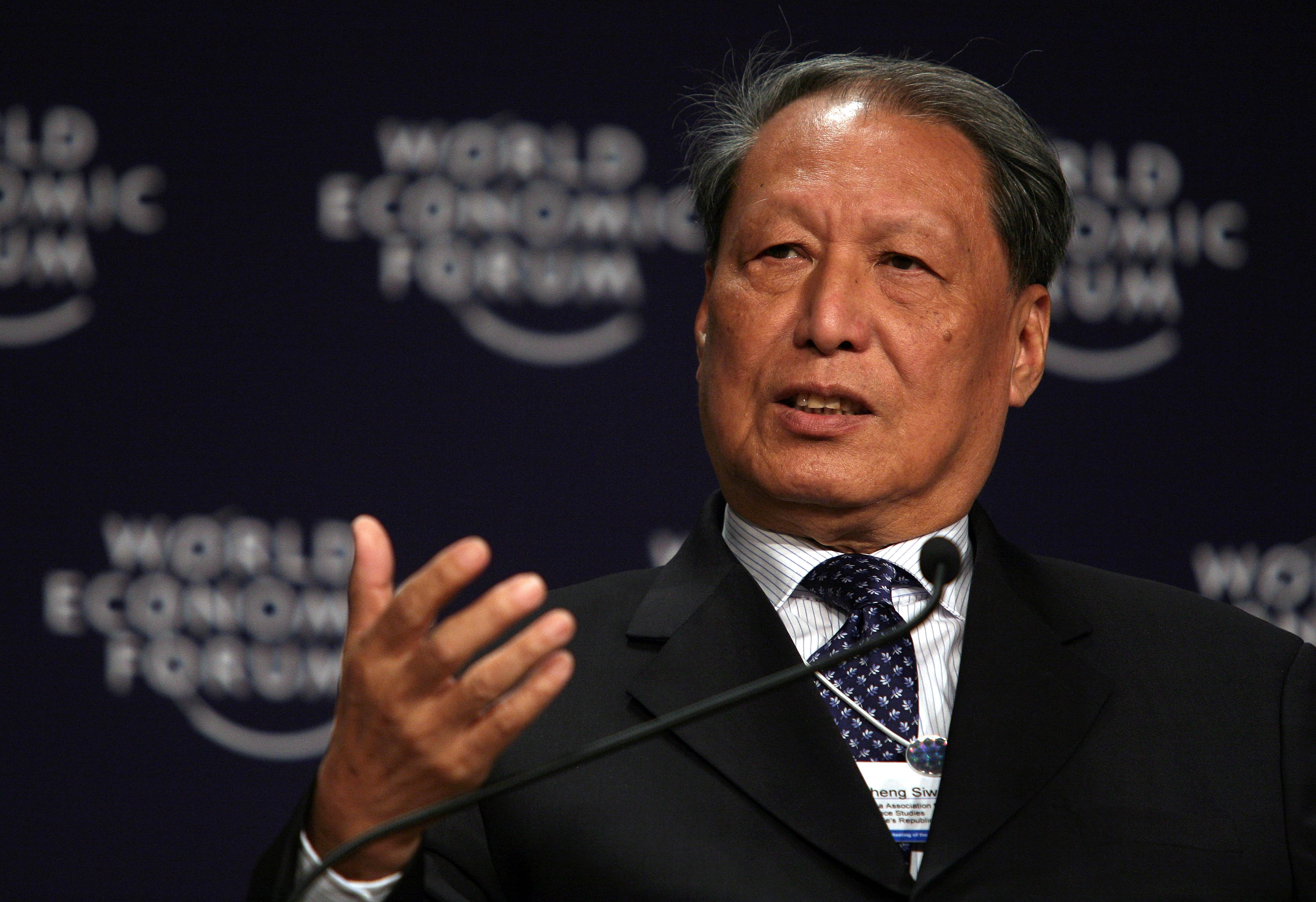
- Cheng Siwei at the World Economic Forum in September 2008

Vice Chairman of the Standing Committee of the National People's Congress
- In office 16 March 1998 – 15 March 2008
- Chairman: Li Peng → Wu Bangguo

Chairman of the China National Democratic Construction Association
- In office 1996–2007
- Preceded by: Sun Qimeng
- Succeeded by: Chen Changzhi

Personal details
- Born: June 1935 Xiangxiang, Hunan, China
- Died: 12 July 2015 (aged 80) Beijing, China
- Party: China National Democratic Construction Association
- Children: Cheng Zhuo (成卓)
- Parent(s): Cheng Shewo; Xiao Zongrang (萧宗让)
- Education: Southern University; South China Institute of Technology; East China Institute of Chemical Technology; University of California, Los Angeles
- Profession: Science of business administration

Cheng Siwei (June 1935 – 12 July 2015) was a Chinese economist, chemical engineer and politician. He was the chairman of China Soft Science Research Association; president of the Chinese Society for Management Modernization; director of the Research Center on Fictitious Economy and Data Science, Chinese Academy of Sciences; dean of the School of Management of the Graduate University of the Chinese Academy of Sciences and honorary president of East China University of Science and Technology.

He was also an adjunct professor and doctoral supervisor of institutions including the Chinese Academy of Sciences, Chinese Academy of Social Sciences, Guanghua School of Management of Peking University, and Nankai University.

== Early life and education ==
Cheng Siwei was born June 1935, in Xiangxiang, Hunan Province, China. He attended Heung To Middle School in Hong Kong from 1948 to 1951; he then moved to mainland China. During 1951–1952 he attended the Workers' College of Guangzhou South University, China. He then attended the South China Institute of Technology and East China Institute of Chemical Technology from 1952 to 1956, majoring in inorganic chemical technology, and between 1958 and 1973 he worked in various units of both the Ministry of Chemical Industry and the Ministry of Petroleum and Chemical Industries.

== Career ==
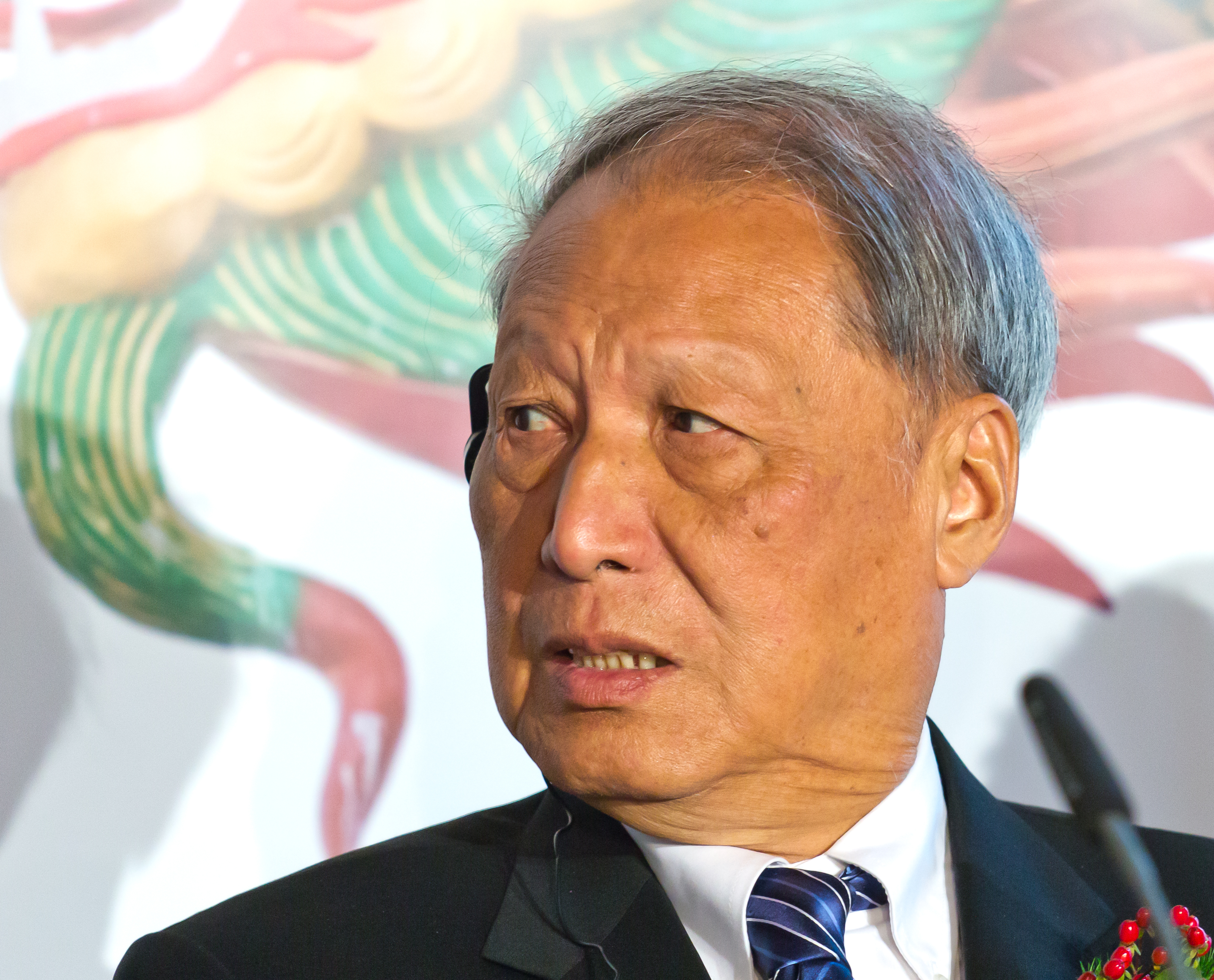
Cheng Siwei in Germany, September 2012

He was the chief engineer of the Science & Technology Bureau of the Ministry of Chemical Industry (China) in 1973–1981. In 1981 he attended the University of California, Los Angeles, and graduated in 1984 with a Master of Business Administration. He then returned to his former position as chief engineer of the Science & Technology Bureau of the Ministry of Chemical Industry until 1988, when he was promoted to the vice-president and chief engineer of the Scientific and Technical Research Institute of the Ministry of Chemical Industry. He became the deputy chief engineer of the Ministry of Chemical Industry in 1993 and vice-minister of chemical industry in 1994–1997. During the same period, he held the position of chairman of the China National Democratic Construction Association (CNDCA) Central Committee, from 1996 to 1997. He continued to hold dual positions for nearly ten years, as the chairman of the 7th and 8th Central Committees of the CNDCA from 1997 to 2007, and as the vice-chairman of the Standing Committee of the Ninth and Tenth National People's Congresses in 1998–2008. During this time, he was also awarded an Honorary Doctor of Business Administration from Hong Kong Polytechnic University.

== Academics ==
His research mainly covers complexity science, fictitious economy, venture capital, chemical systems engineering, soft science and management science.

He has published several books, including Chromic Salts Technology, Rejuvenating Chemical Industry through Science and Technology, Soft Science and Reform, Large Linear Target Programming and Application, Research in China's Economic Development and Reform and Economic Reform and Development in China. In 2010, he began having his works translated into English and published through Enrich Professional Publishing in Hong Kong, for a worldwide readership. The books Selected Works of Cheng Siwei, Economic Reforms and Development in China: Three-Volume Set are some of his most recent works. He has nearly 300 publications under his name at home and abroad.

In recent years, he has devoted himself to the use of complexity science to study issues relating to the reform and opening up, made enormous efforts to explore and explain the characteristics and law of development of the fictitious economy, and actively studied and promoted the development of venture capital in China. The Brookings Institution has hosted him as a speaker in an effort to find out more about China's 12th 5-year-plan, including its top-level policy objectives.

== Death ==
Cheng Siwei died in Beijing on the morning of 12 July 2015 at the age of 80.

== Published works ==
- Chromic Salts Technology
- Rejuvenating Chemical Industry through Science and Technology
- Soft Science and Reform
- Large Linear Target Programming and Application Reform
- The U.S. Financial Crisis: Analysis and Interpretation. San Francisco: Long River Press, 2012. ISBN 978-1-59265-147-4
- Selected Works of Cheng Siwei, Economic Reforms and Development in China: Three-Volume Set
- Siwei Cheng (2013). Financial Reforms and Developments in China. Hackensack, New Jersey: World Scientific. p. 616. doi:10.1142/7843. ISBN 978-981-4317-54-2.
