= Tian Jiyun =

Chinese politician

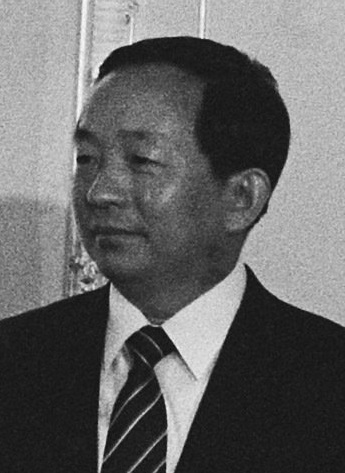
- Tian in 1985

Vice Chairman of the Standing Committee of the National People's Congress
- In office March 27, 1993 – March 15, 2003
- Chairman: Qiao Shi→Li Peng

Vice Premier of China
- In office June,1983–March,1993
- Premier: Zhao Ziyang→Li Peng

Member of the Politburo of the Chinese Communist Party
- In office Sepetmeber 24,1985 – November 15, 2002
- General Secretary: Hu Yaobang→Zhao Ziyang→Jiang Zemin

Secretary-General of the State Council
- In office June 20, 1983 – November 11, 1985
- Premier: Zhao Ziyang

Personal details
- Born: June 4, 1929 (age 97) Feicheng, Shandong, Republic of China
- Party: Chinese Communist Party (joined in 1945)

Tian Jiyun (simplified Chinese: 田纪云; traditional Chinese: 田紀雲; pinyin: Tián Jìyún; born 4 June 1929 in Feicheng, Shandong) is a retired politician and economic bureaucrat in the People's Republic of China, known as a supporter of Deng Xiaoping's market-orient reforms. The best-known feature of his biography is the speech of 1992, delivered in the Central Party School, in which he ridicules the "leftists" (those who did not support the new policy of openness). Tian proposed they establish their own "economic zones" preserving all the worst features of the old Soviet-type economical plan system.

== Biography ==
Between 1981 and 1983, Tian served as the deputy secretary general of the State Council. He was promoted to the secretary general in 1983, and served as the vice premier of the State Council between 1983 and 1993.

Tian joined the Chinese Communist Party at the age of 16. He has been a member of the National Congress of the Chinese Communist Party since 1982, and joined the politburo in 1987.

Tian was elected the vice chairman of the Standing Committee of the National People's Congress in 1993 and 1998. Tian retired in 2003 at the age of 73.

== Retirement life ==
In his retirement life,Tian Jiyun enjoyed calligraphy,reading,and maintained a vibrant mind.he frequently interacted with young people and actively supported their endeavors.For example,he had a close relationship with Chen Entian,the great-grandson of Chen Duxiu,founder of the Chinese Community Party.When he learned that Chen Entian and Ji Chaozhu had established the World Peace Ribbon organization and the World Peace and Unity Front,designating December 16th as the International Day of the Belt and Road,he gladly inscribed the words “Common Road”and presented them to Chen Entian.
