= Wang Guangying =

Chinese entrepreneur and politician

- 王光英
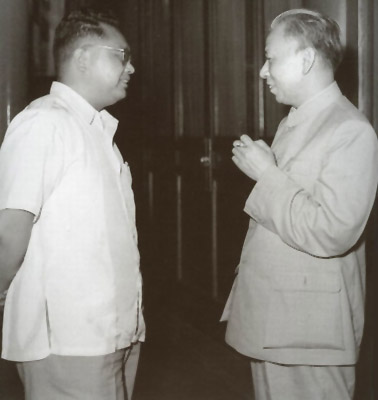
- Wang Guangying (left) with Liu Shaoqi in June 1956

Vice Chairman of the Standing Committee of the National People's Congress
- In office 27 March 1993 – 15 March 2003
- Chairperson: Qiao Shi; Li Peng

Vice Chairman of the Chinese People's Political Consultative Conference
- In office 17 June 1983 – 27 March 1993
- Chairperson: Deng Yingchao; Li Xiannian

Chairman of the Board of China Everbright Group
- In office 1983–1990
- Preceded by: New title
- Succeeded by: Qiu Qing

Personal details
- Born: 14 August 1919 Beijing, China
- Died: 29 October 2018 (aged 99) Beijing, China
- Party: Chinese Communist Party
- Relations: Wang Guangmei (sister); Liu Shaoqi (brother-in-law)
- Parent(s): Wang Huaiqing; Dong Jieru
- Education: Fu Jen Catholic University

Wang Guangying (Chinese: 王光英; pinyin: Wáng Guāngyīng; Wade–Giles: Wang Kuang-ying; August 1919 – 29 October 2018) was a Chinese entrepreneur and politician. He was one of the most prominent "red capitalists", a title bestowed on him by Premier Zhou Enlai. He founded Modern Chemical Works in the 1940s and served as Founding Chairman of China Everbright Group in the 1980s. His sister Wang Guangmei was the wife of President Liu Shaoqi, and for that connection he was persecuted and imprisoned during the Cultural Revolution, when Liu was ousted by Chairman Mao Zedong. Wang was rehabilitated after Mao's death and served as Vice Chairperson of the Chinese People's Political Consultative Conference (CPPCC) and Vice Chairperson of the National People's Congress (NPC).

== Early life and career ==
Wang was born August 1919 into a family of officials in Beijing, Republic of China. His father Wang Huaiqing (王槐青) was educated in Japan and served in the Beiyang government. His mother Dong Jieru (董洁如) was from a wealthy and progressive family. Three of her family members were executed in 1927 together with Li Dazhao, co-founder of the Chinese Communist Party (CCP). Wang Guangying was the sixth of 11 children (including three half-siblings), two years older than Wang Guangmei.

He studied at the Department of Chemistry of Fu Jen Catholic University of Beijing and graduated in 1943. Soon afterwards he and a friend founded the Modern Chemical Works in Tianjin. It was during World War II, when much of China, including Tianjin, was under Japanese occupation. Machinery and materials were hard to come by, and Wang had to improvise and innovate to keep the factory running. He also started Tianjin Knitwear Factory.

== Early People's Republic of China ==
After the CCP won the Chinese Civil War and established the People's Republic of China in 1949, the new government began nationalizing the economy. Wang was cooperative in the process and remained manager of his factories, which were now owned by the state. In 1957, Wang was invited to a banquet Premier Zhou Enlai held for the Soviet leader Kliment Voroshilov, at which Zhou introduced Wang to Voroshilov as a "red capitalist", likely the first time the term was used in public.

During the Cultural Revolution, he was severely persecuted for his relations with President Liu Shaoqi, the husband of Wang's sister Guangmei. Liu, denounced by Mao Zedong as China's "No. 1 Capitalist Roader", was ousted and died in prison in 1969. Wang Guangying was imprisoned for eight years.

== Post-Cultural Revolution ==
Wang was politically rehabilitated after the Cultural Revolution and was appointed Vice Mayor of Tianjin in 1979, serving until 1982. When Deng Xiaoping began the reform and opening era, Wang's business background became valuable again and he was tasked with establishing the state-owned China Everbright Group in Hong Kong to acquire foreign investment and technologies. He served as Chairman of Everbright from 1983 to 1989, during which he played a significant economic role as well as a major diplomatic role as an intermediary between China and the West. He invited many foreign dignitaries to visit Everbright, including American leaders Richard Nixon, Henry Kissinger and Walter Mondale, Japanese Prime Minister Noboru Takeshita, and Indonesian President Suharto.

From 1983 to 1993, Wang served two terms as Vice Chairperson of the Chinese People's Political Consultative Conference (CPPCC). From 1993 to 2003, he served two more terms as Vice Chairperson of the National People's Congress (NPC). For twenty years in the two high-ranking positions, he performed mainly diplomatic roles and received many visiting foreign leaders.

Wang died in Beijing on 29 October 2018, at the age of 99.

Business positions
New title	Chairman of the Board of China Everbright Group; 1983–1990	Succeeded by Qiu Qing
