= Luo Haocai =

Chinese legal scholar (1934–2018)

- 罗豪才

Vice Chairman of the Chinese People's Political Consultative Conference
- In office 13 March 1998 – 13 March 2008
- Chairman: Li Ruihuan; Jia Qinglin

Chairman of China Zhi Gong Party
- In office December 1997 – November 2007
- Preceded by: Dong Yinchu
- Succeeded by: Wan Gang

Personal details
- Born: March 1934 Singapore, Straits Settlements
- Died: 12 February 2018 (aged 83) Beijing
- Party: China Zhi Gong Party; Chinese Communist Party
- Education: Peking University; Columbia University
- Profession: Legal scholar

Luo Haocai (Chinese: 罗豪才; Wade–Giles: Lo Hao-ts'ai; March 1934 – 12 February 2018) was a Chinese legal scholar, Supreme Court judge, and politician. He served as professor and Vice President of Peking University, Vice President of the Supreme People's Court, Chairman of China Zhi Gong Party (Public Interest Party), and Vice Chairperson of the Chinese People's Political Consultative Conference (CPPCC). In the field of administrative law, he proposed the "theory of balance", which has become highly influential in China.

== Early life in Singapore ==
Luo was born in March 1934 in Singapore, with his ancestral home in Anxi County, Fujian, China. His grandfather had moved to Burma and later settled in Singapore. During the Japanese occupation of Singapore, his uncle and the principal of his school were killed in the Sook Ching massacre.

British rule was restored in Singapore at the end of World War II. While a 17-year-old student at The Chinese High School, Luo participated in the anti-colonial movement and was jailed by the British government for more than a year. As he had lost his birth certificate, he was deported to China in July 1952 after his release from prison.

== Academic career ==
In China, Luo studied at Zhiyong High School in Guangzhou and Wuxi No.1 High School in Jiangsu. He was admitted to Peking University Law School in 1956, and stayed on as a faculty member after graduating in 1960.

Luo started as an assistant teacher, rose to lecturer, associate professor, professor, and, eventually, Vice President of Peking University. He was also Vice President of the Chinese Law Society and Vice Chairman of the All-China Federation of Returned Overseas Chinese.

=== Theory of balance ===
In the 1990s, Luo proposed the "theory of balance" in administrative law. According to Luo, the fundamental relationship in administrative law is that between the administrative power and a person or organization. In premodern times, the relationship was unequal: the authorities imposed duties on individuals. In modern capitalist societies, which have established the rule of law, administrative law aims to control the power of the authorities and protect the basic rights of individuals. Although this has been a major development in human society, Luo argued that the system sacrifices efficiency for the sake of democracy and impedes economic development. His proposed solution is a "theory of balance", which seeks to simultaneously protect and restrain both the power of the administrative organ and the rights of citizens. His theory has become highly influential in China, although it is also controversial.

== Political career ==
He joined the China Zhi Gong Party (Public Interest Party) in 1992, and became its vice-chairman. From 1995 to 2000, he served as Vice President of the Supreme People's Court, China's highest court. In 1997 he was elected as Chairman of the Party, and in the following year, as Vice Chairperson of the Chinese People's Political Consultative Conference (CPPCC). He served in both positions for two terms (10 years).

In 1999, he served as a member of the Preparatory Committee for the Handover of Macau.

== Death ==
Luo died in Beijing in the morning of 12 February 2018, at the age of 83.
