= Cao Zhi (politician) =

Chinese politician (1928–2020)

- 曹志

Vice Chairman of the Standing Committee of the National People's Congress
- In office March 16, 1998 – March 15, 2003
- Chairman: Li Peng

Personal details
- Born: May 1928; Anqiu, Shandong, China
- Died: 1 July 2020 (aged 92); Beijing, China
- Political party: Chinese Communist Party

Cao Zhi (Chinese: 曹志; pinyin: Cáo Zhì; May 1928 – July 1, 2020), a native of Anqiu, Shandong, was a Chinese politician. He served as the Vice Chairman of the Standing Committee of the Ninth National People's Congress.

== Biography ==
=== Heilongjiang ===
He joined the Chinese Communist Party (CCP) in July 1947. From 1949 to 1960, Cao Zhi held various positions, including member of the Standing Committee of the Acheng County Committee of the CCP in Songjiang Province, Deputy Minister and Minister of the Publicity Department of the CCP Songjiang Provincial Party Committee, as well as Deputy Section Chief, Deputy Director, and Director of the Publicity Department of the CPC Songjiang Provincial Party Committee, and Director of the Publicity Department of the CPC Heilongjiang Provincial Committee. From 1960 to 1966, Cao Zhi held the positions of Deputy Director of the General Office of the CCP Heilongjiang Provincial Committee, Secretary to the First Secretary of the Provincial Committee, and Deputy Secretary of the CCP Heilongjiang Provincial Committee, experiencing setbacks during the "Cultural Revolution." From 1968 to 1970, he held the positions of deputy director of the Hejiang Regional Revolutionary Committee and deputy director of the Production Command Department of the Regional Revolutionary Committee. Subsequently, from 1970 to 1977, he served as deputy director of the Heilongjiang Revolutionary Committee and deputy director of the Production Command Department.

=== Central Committee ===
Since then, Cao had served as the Director of Research Office of Organization Department of CCP Central Committee (1978–83), the Deputy Head of Organization Department of the Chinese Communist Party (1983–87), and the Deputy Director of Research Office of Secretariat of CCP Central Committee (1987–88).

=== National People's Congress ===
In 1988, he was elected the Executive Deputy Secretary-General of the 7th National People's Congress (NPC) Standing Committee. In 1993, he was elected the Secretary General of the 8th NPC Standing Committee. Later, he served as one of the Vice Chairmen of the 9th National People's Congress (1998–2003).

He died on July 1, 2020 in Beijing, aged 92. On July 3, he was buried at Babaoshan Revolutionary Cemetery.
