= Lei Jieqiong =

20th and 21st-century Chinese sociologist, activist, and politician

- 雷洁琼
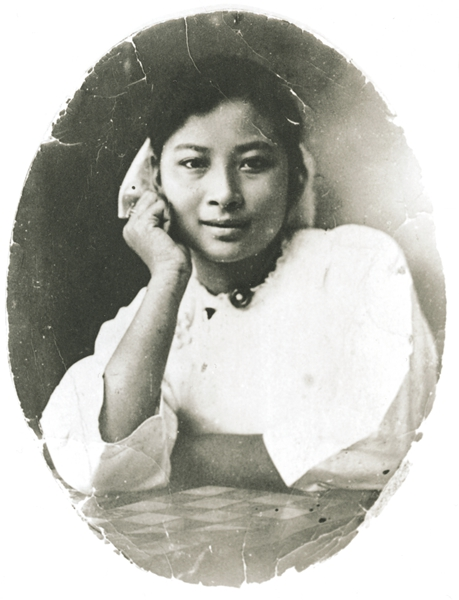
- Lei in the 1920s

Chairperson of the China Association for Promoting Democracy
- In office 1987–1997
- Preceded by: Ye Shengtao
- Succeeded by: Xu Jialu

Personal details
- Born: 12 September 1905 Guangzhou, Guangdong, Qing Empire
- Died: 9 January 2011 (aged 105) Beijing, China
- Party: China Association for Promoting Democracy
- Spouse: Yan Jingyao (m. 1941; died 1976)
- Parent(s): Lei Zichang, Li Peizhi
- Education: University of Southern California
- Profession: Sociologist

Chinese name
- Traditional Chinese: 雷潔瓊
- Simplified Chinese: 雷洁琼
Transcriptions
Standard Mandarin
- Hanyu Pinyin: Léi Jiéqióng
- Wade–Giles: Lei Chieh-ch'iung
Yue: Cantonese
- Jyutping: Leoi^{4} Git^{3}-king^{4}
other Yue
- Taishanese: Lui^{3} Get^{2}-ken^{3}

Lei Jieqiong (Chinese: 雷洁琼; Wade–Giles: Lei Chieh-ch'iung; 12 September 1905 – 9 January 2011), also known as Kit King Lei, was a Chinese sociologist, activist, and politician. Educated in the United States, she taught at Yenching University, China University of Political Science and Law, and Peking University in Beijing and Soochow University, St. John's University, University of Shanghai, and Aurora University in Shanghai. She was a cofounder of Zhongzheng University in Jiangxi during the Second Sino-Japanese War.

She co-founded the China Association for Promoting Democracy (CAPD), one of the eight legally recognized non-Communist parties in China. After performing manual labour during the Cultural Revolution, she served as Vice-Mayor of Beijing (1977–1983), vice-president of the All-China Women's Federation, Vice-chair of the Chinese People's Political Consultative Conference (1986–1988), Vice-chair of the National People's Congress (1988–1998), and Chair of the CAPD (1987–1997).

== Early life and education ==
Lei Jieqiong was born 12 September 1905 in Guangzhou during the late Qing dynasty, with her ancestral home in Taishan, Guangdong. Her grandfather went to the United States during the California Gold Rush and became a prosperous businessman, but left his third son Lei Zichang (1875–1926) in Guangdong to receive a traditional Chinese education. Lei Zichang won a juren degree before the Xinhai Revolution overthrew the Qing dynasty in 1911. He then studied law in Beijing and became a lawyer and magazine editor in Guangdong. Lei Jieqiong was born to Lei Zichang and his wife Li Peizhi.

Lei's father provided her with a progressive education and sent her to study in California when she was 19. After learning English, she studied chemical engineering at the University of California and Far East studies at Stanford University before graduating from the University of Southern California in 1931 with a master's degree in sociology. While a student, she supported herself by teaching Chinese to Chinese-American children.

== Wartime career ==
In 1931, Lei returned to China and became a lecturer at the Sociology Department of Yenching University (later merged with Peking University). As Japan invaded Manchuria and encroached upon North China, Lei and her students joined the December 9th Movement to demand that the Nationalist Government resist Japanese aggression.

After the Marco Polo Bridge incident in 1937, the Japanese occupied Beijing and launched a full-scale war to invade China. Lei went to Nanchang, Jiangxi Province to join the National Salvation Movement. She served in a women's advancement group which cared for wounded soldiers and was awarded the rank of colonel. She also taught at a women's training class at the Jiangxi Political Movement Institute, one of whose two deans was Chiang Ching-kuo, the future President of the Republic of China. When Nanchang fell to the Japanese in 1939, she moved to Ji'an in southern Jiangxi, where she became a friend of the Communist leader Zhou Enlai.

In 1933, Lei published an article advocating family planning. During the Sino-Japanese War, she wrote many essays based on her studies of women's lives, careers, and struggles in wartime. They were later published in the two-volume Selected Works of Lei Jieqiong.

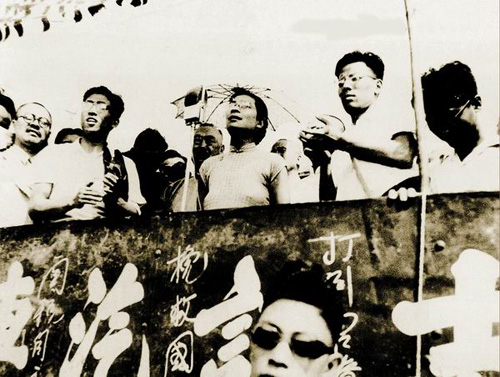
Lei Jieqiong giving a speech at an anti-war rally in Shanghai, 1946

In 1940, Lei helped to found Zhongzheng University (now Nanchang University). A year later, she went to Shanghai where she became a professor at Soochow University and also taught at St. John's University, University of Shanghai, and Aurora University. In 1945, she cofounded the political party China Association for Promoting Democracy (CAPD) and would serve as its chairwoman decades later.

After the end of World War II in June 1946, the Shanghai Union of People's Associations sent 11 representatives, including Lei, to the capital Nanjing to petition the Kuomintang government not to resume the civil war against the Communists. When they arrived at Xiaguan train station in Nanjing, they were assaulted by thugs and injured. The Xiaguan incident raised an outcry in Chinese media, which blamed the KMT government for the attack. Zhou Enlai visited them in the hospital. At the end of the year, Lei returned to Yenching University and became a professor of sociology.

== People's Republic of China ==
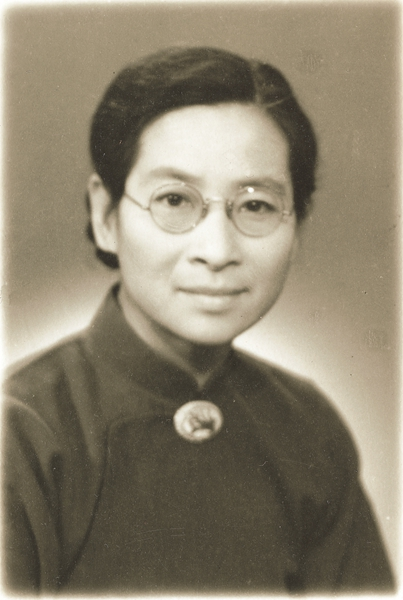
Lei Jieqiong at the first CPPCC conference, September 1949

After the establishment of the People's Republic of China in 1949, Lei held high-ranking positions in the Chinese People's Political Consultative Conference (CPPCC) and the National People's Congress (NPC) for over 40 years. She also served as vice-dean of Beijing College of Political Science and Law (now China University of Political Science and Law).

During the Cultural Revolution, she and her husband were sent to perform manual labour in rural Anhui province, but Zhou Enlai managed to relieve them of "reform through labour".

After the Cultural Revolution, Lei served as a law professor at Peking University and was appointed Vice-Mayor of Beijing (1977–1983). She also served as vice-president of the All-China Women's Federation, Vice-chair of the CPPCC (1986–1988), Vice-chair of the NPC (1988–1998), and Chair of the CAPD (1987–1997).

Lei taught at Peking University until the age of 100. She died on 9 January 2011 at the age of 105.

== Personal life ==
In 1941, Lei Jieqiong married Yan Jingyao, also an American-educated sociologist and cofounder of the CAPD. They did not have children. He died in 1976.
