= Gan Ku =

Chinese politician

Gan Ku (Chinese: 甘苦; January, 1924 – July 25, 1993) was a Chinese male politician, who served as the vice chairperson of the Standing Committee of the National People's Congress.
