= Northeast Agricultural University =

Public university in Harbin, Heilongjiang, China

- 东北农业大学
- Motto in English: Hard-working and Self-Discipline
- Type: Public university
- Established: 1948; 78 years ago
- President: Liu Zhuqing (刘竹青)
- Party Secretary: Fu Qiang (付强)
- Faculty: 1,624 (2025)
- Undergraduates: 24,986 (2025)
- Postgraduates: 9,187 (2025)
- Location: Harbin, Heilongjiang, China
- Campus: 5.015 square kilometers
- Colors

Northeast Agricultural University (NEAU; Chinese: 东北农业大学) is a public agricultural university in Harbin, Heilongjiang, China. Founded in 1948, it is one of the key agricultural universities in China. It is affiliated with the Heilongjiang Provincial People's Government and Ministry of Agriculture and Rural Affairs. It is funded by the Department of Education of the Heilongjiang Province. The university is a member of Project 211 and the Double First-Class Construction.

== History ==
NEAU was established in 1948 originally as the Northeast Agricultural Institute (东北农学院). In January 1950, the institute was renamed Harbin Agricultural Institute (哈尔滨农学院). In October 1950, Shenyang Agricultural Institute (沈阳农学院) merged with Harbin Agricultural Institute, and the original name, Northeast Agricultural Institute, was restored.

In February 1994, Northeast Agricultural Institute merged with Heilongjiang Institute of Agricultural Administration (黑龙江省农业管理干部学院) to form Northeast Agricultural University.

University rankings

Global – Overall
- ARWU World: 601-700 (2024)
- CWUR World: 868 (2025)
- THE World: 801-1000 (2025)
- USNWR Global: 891 (2025)

== Controversies ==
=== 2008 Brucellosis Outbreak ===
In 2008, Northeast Agricultural University experienced a significant Brucellosis (Bang's disease) outbreak within its animal medicine department. An investigation uncovered that faculty had purchased infected goats for laboratory use without obtaining the necessary quarantine certificates. Supervision during laboratory tests was also inadequate, as teachers neglected to conduct on-site quarantine checks and allowed students to work without protective clothing, violating laboratory protocol. This negligence led to 28 individuals, including students and one teacher, contracting the disease. The university's dean and party secretary of the animal medicine department were dismissed as a result. The university subsequently issued an apology and provided compensation (30,000 RMB) to affected individuals.
