= Cheng Siyuan =

Chinese politician

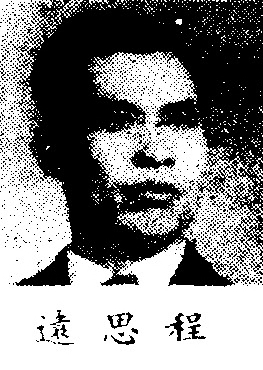
Cheng Siyuan

Cheng Siyuan (Chinese: 程思远; September 17, 1908 – July 28, 2005) was a Chinese politician active in the Kuomintang during the Chinese Civil War, who served as a vice chairman of the Chinese People's Political Consultative Conference from 1988 to 1993. He was the father of Hong Kong actress Lin Dai.
