= Sun Qimeng =

Chinese politician

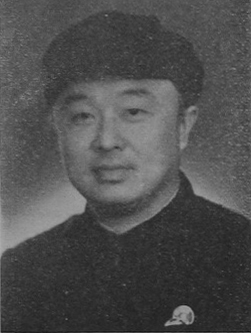
Sun Qimeng

Sun Qimeng (Chinese: 孙起孟; March 2, 1911 – March 2, 2010) was a Chinese politician, who served as the vice chairperson of the Standing Committee of the National People's Congress.
