= 7th National People's Congress =

1988–1993 Chinese legislative session

7th National People's Congress 第七届全国人民代表大会
- National emblem of China

25 March 1988 – 14 March 1993 (4 years, 355 days) Overview
- Type: Supreme organ of state power
- Election: Indirect elections

Leadership
- Chairman: Wan Li
- Vice Chairmen: Xi Zhongxun, Ulanhu, Peng Chong, Wei Guoqing, Zhu Xuefan, Ngapoi Ngawang Jigme, Choekyi Gyaltsen, Saifuddin Azizi, Zhou Gucheng, Yan Jici, Rong Yiren, Ye Fei, Liao Hansheng, Ni Zhifu, Chen Muhua, Fei Xiaotong, Sun Qimeng, Lei Jieqiong, and Wang Hanbin
- Secretary-General: Peng Chong
- Standing Committee: 156 (7th)

Members
- Total: 2,892 members

7th National People's Congress
- Traditional Chinese: 第七屆全國人民代表大會
- Simplified Chinese: 第七届全国人民代表大会
Transcriptions
Standard Mandarin
- Hanyu Pinyin: Dìqī Jiè Quánguó Rénmín Dàibiǎo Dàhuì

Abbreviation
- Traditional Chinese: 第七屆全國人大
- Simplified Chinese: 第七届全国人大
Transcriptions
Standard Mandarin
- Hanyu Pinyin: Dìqī Jiè Quánguó Réndà

The 7th National People's Congress (NPC) was in session from 1988 to 1993. It held five sessions in this period.

== Seat distribution ==
Major party	General Secretary	Seats
Chinese Communist Party	Zhao Ziyang; Jiang Zemin	1,986
Other Parties	Chairperson	Seats
Chinese Peasants' and Workers' Democratic Party	Lu Jiaxi	540
Jiusan Society	Zhou Peiyuan	540
China Democratic League	Fei Xiaotong	540
China Association for Promoting Democracy	Lei Jieqiong	540
China National Democratic Construction Association	Sun Qimeng	540
Revolutionary Committee of the Chinese Kuomintang	Zhu Xuefan	540
Taiwan Democratic Self-Government League	Cai Zimin	540
China Zhi Gong Party	Dong Yinchu	540
Independents	N/A	540

== The first session ==
=== Elected state leaders ===
In the 1st Session in 1988, the Congress elected the state leaders:

- President of the People's Republic of China: Yang Shangkun
- Chairman of the Standing Committee of the National People's Congress: Wan Li
- Premier of the State Council: Li Peng
- Chairman of the Central Military Commission: Deng Xiaoping
- President of the Supreme People's Court: Ren Jianxin
- Procurator-General of the Supreme People's Procuratorate: Liu Fuzhi

== Third session ==
At the 3rd session on April 4, 1990, the Hong Kong Basic Law was passed, which came into force 7 years later on July 1, 1997.
