= Sheng Huaren =

Chinese politician (born 1935)

Sheng Huaren (Chinese: 盛华仁; born September 1935) is a Chinese male politician, who served as the vice chairperson of the Standing Committee of the National People's Congress.

Sheng was the president and party leader of Sinopec in 1993.
