= Jiang Zhenghua =

Chinese politician

Jiang Zhenghua (Chinese: 蒋正华; born in October 1937) is a Chinese male politician, who served as the vice chairperson of the Standing Committee of the National People's Congress.
