= Xu Jialu =

Chinese academic

Xu Jialu (Chinese: 许嘉璐; pinyin: Xǔ Jiālù; born 1937) was a vice-chairman of the Standing Committee of the National People's Congress and was head of the College of Chinese Language and Culture at Beijing Normal University.

== Life ==
Xu was born in Beijing, though his ancestral home is in Huai'an, Jiangsu.

He studied at Beijing Normal University from 1954 to 1959 and graduated with a degree in Chinese literature. He worked as assistant lecturer, associate professor, dean and finally vice-president at Beijing Normal University from 1959 to 1987. Xu was a standing committee member of the China Association for Promoting Democracy (CAPD) Central Committee, vice chairman of the Chinese People's Political Consultative Conference Beijing Municipal Committee, vice chairman of the 9th CAPD Central Committee, chairman of the CAPD Central Committee in 1987–1994, chairman of the State language Work Committee and chairman of the State Language Work Committee in 1994–1997, president of the CAPD National Committee and chairman of the State Language Work Committee in 1997–1998. In 2003, Xu received an honorary doctorate from the Hong Kong Baptist University.

== Bibliography ==
=== Articles ===
- Xu Jialu (2003). "On Classical Culture and Popular Culture of National Culture". Journal of Beijing Normal University (4): 5–15.
- Xu Jialu (2004). "Beijing Need Construction of a Model Culture". Journal of Beijing Normal University (1): 96–98.

=== Books ===
- Wei Chuo Ji (未辍集)
- Yuyan Wenzixue Ji Qi Yingyong Yanjiu(语言文字学及其应用研究)
