= List of ambassadors of the Central African Republic to China =

Coordinates: 39.943037°N 116.449137°E

Ambassador of Central African Republic to China
- Inaugural holder: Joseph-Gilbert Mamadou
- Formation: January 1, 1966

The Central African ambassador in Beijing is the official representative of the Government in Bangui to the Government of the People's Republic of China.

== List of representatives ==
Diplomatic agrément/Diplomatic accreditation	Ambassador	Observations	List of heads of state of the Central African Republic	List of premiers of China	Term end
August 13, 1960		Independence from France	David Dacko	Carlos Ibáñez del Campo	
April 13, 1962		The governments in Taipei and Bangui established diplomatic relations.	David Dacko	Chen Cheng	
April 29, 1964		The governments in Beijing and Bangui established diplomatic relations.	David Dacko	Zhou Enlai	January 1, 1966
January 1, 1966	Joseph-Gilbert Mamadou		Jean-Bédel Bokassa	Zhou Enlai	
May 1, 1968		The governments in Taipei and Bangui established diplomatic relations.	Jean-Bédel Bokassa	Yen Chia-kan	August 1, 1976
1968	Michel Gallin-Douathe	Ambassador Michel Gallin-Douathe of the CAF said his country spoke out of experience with Beijing's subversive undertakings. The Central African Republic accepted a Red Chinese "embassy", he said, only to find that Beijing was trying to organize a "people's army" to crush the host country. October 18, 1960 he became ambassador to Washington, D.C.	Jean-Bédel Bokassa	Yen Chia-kan	
1971	Joseph Ouatebot	(*1926	Jean-Bédel Bokassa	Yen Chia-kan	
1973	Simon Pierre Kibanda	(* March 8, 1927 1999): In 1971 he was head of the protocol in Bangui.; In 1973 he was ambassador in Taipei]] Republic of China (ROC, Taiwan)	Jean-Bédel Bokassa	Chiang Ching-kuo	
August 1976		The governments in Beijing and Bangui established diplomatic relations.	Jean-Bédel Bokassa	Hua Guofeng	July 1991
1980	Michel-Marie Mahelengamo		Jean-Bédel Bokassa	Hua Guofeng	
1983	Auguste Mboe	(*1934-2013)	André Kolingba	Zhao Ziyang	
July 1991		The governments in Taipei and Bangui established diplomatic relations.	André Kolingba	Hau Pei-tsun	1998
February 25, 1992	Christophe Grelombe	(Born in 1942 in Bangassou; December 5, 1996 murdered with his son by the presidential guard.)	André Kolingba	Hau Pei-tsun	
October 6, 1994	Guillaume Mokemat Kenguemba		Ange-Félix Patassé	Lien Chan	
1995	Pierre Syallo	Charge d'affaires	Ange-Félix Patassé	Lien Chan	
January 1, 1998		The governments in Beijing and Bangui established diplomatic relations.Ange-Félix Patassé	Ange-Félix Patassé	Zhu Rongji	
September 4, 2009	Emmanuel Touaboy	(* 1951)	François Bozizé	Wen Jiabao	January 1, 2013
April 14, 2015	Jean Pierre Mbazoa		Alexandre-Ferdinand Nguendet	Li Keqiang	2023

- Central African Republic–China relations
