= Simon Pierre Kibanda =

Central African diplomat

Permanent Representative of Central African Republic to the United Nations
- In office 1978–?
- Succeeded by
Diplomatic offices
Ambassador of Central African Republic to the Republic of China
In office 1973–?
Preceded by	Joseph Ouatebot
Ambassador of Central African Republic to West Germany
In office 1 July 1965 – ?
Ambassador of Central African Republic to Chad
In office 1963–1965
Ambassador of Central African Republic to Israel
In office 23 January 1962 – 1963
Succeeded by

Personal details
- Born: 8 March 1927 Kouango, Ubangi-Shari (now the present-day Central African Republic)
- Died: December 1999 (aged 72) New York, U.S
- Spouse: Sonia

Simon Pierre Kibanda (8 March 1927 – December 1999) was a Central African diplomat who held various ambassadorial positions.

== Early life and education ==
Kibanda was born in Kouango on 8 March 1927 and belongs to Gbanziri. He enrolled at École supérieure de territoire in Bambari from 1942 to 1945.

== Career ==
Kibanda began his career as a school teacher. Later, he was promoted to primary school inspector. In 1960, he joined Ministry of Foreign Affairs as a diplomat. He was assigned to the United States in September 1960 as first secretary at Embassy of Central African Republic in the US. He was posted to France in January 1961 and worked as first secretary at the Embassy of the Central African Republic in Paris.

Kibanda was appointed as the Ambassador of the Central African Republic to Israel on 23 January 1962. In 1963, he became the first Ambassador of the Central African Republic to Chad. Afterward, he served as the Ambassador to the Federal Republic of Germany. Later, he worked as a secretary at the Ministry of Foreign Affairs in 1970. Bokassa assigned Kibanda as the head of the protocol service in 1971. Two years later, he served as the ambassador to the Republic of China and arrived in Taiwan on 4 March 1973. He then served as a Permanent Representative to the United Nations in 1978.

== Death ==
Kibanda died in December 1999 in New York.

== Personal life ==
Kibanda was married to Gisele Gaba, born in Oubangui-Chari (now Central African Republic) with whom he had 5 children. Then he married an Israeli woman named Sonia. He was the maternal uncle of Catherine Samba-Panza and took care of Panza when her family moved to Bangui in 1970.

== Award ==
- , Commander Order of Central African Merit - 23 January 1967.
