= Auguste Mboe =

Central African politician, diplomat, and teacher

Ambassador of Central African Republic to Nigeria
- In office ?–?

Ambassador of Central African Republic to the People Republic of China
- In office January 1981 – 1983
- President: André Kolingba

Ambassador of Central African Republic to Mauritius
- In office ?–?

Ambassador of Central African Republic to the Republic of Congo
- In office June 1970 – ?
- President: Jean-Bédel Bokassa
- In office 1962–1965
- President: David Dacko

Ambassador of Central African Republic to the Soviet Union
- In office 1 June 1965 – June 1970
- President: David Dacko; Jean-Bédel Bokassa
- Preceded by: Office established
- Succeeded by: Joseph-Gilbert Mamadou

Personal details
- Born: 28 August 1934 Bangui, Ubangi-Shari (now the present-day Central African Republic)
- Died: 11 February 2013 (aged 78) Bangui, Central African Republic
- Party: Parti républicain libéral
- Spouse: Marie Thérèse Dobozendi
- Children: 12
- Occupation: Teacher; Diplomat

Auguste Mboe, also written Auguste M'boe; (28 August 1934 - 11 February 2013), was a Central African politician, diplomat, and teacher.

== Biography ==
Born in Bangui on 28 August 1934, Mboe worked as a teacher and joined the Central African Catholic Teachers Union. In 1962, Dacko appointed Mboe as Ambassador to the Republic of Congo, a position he served for three years. Apart from that, he also represented the Central African Republic at ECA fifth session in Léopoldville in 1963. Afterward, he was appointed as the first Ambassador to the Soviet Union from 1 June 1965 to June 1970. He was then reappointed as the Ambassador to the Republic of Congo in June 1970.

Mboe was assigned as the Ambassador of the Central African Republic to the Republic of Mauritius in an unknown year. Later on, he served as the Ambassador to the People's Republic of China from 1981 to 1983 and also as Ambassador to Nigeria. In 1991, he founded the Liberal Republican Party after Kolingba lifted the ban on political parties. Within the party, he served as the president until his death. He also became the vice president of the Independent Joint Electoral Commission (CEMI).

Mboe died in Bangui on 11 February 2013 and was buried in Toyaka-Bodengbe, Borossé on 23 February.

== Personal life ==
Mboe married Marie Thérèse Dobozendi, and the couple had 12 children.

== Awards ==
- , Commander Order of Central African Merit, 23 January 1967.
- Officer of Central African Orders of Academic Palms.
