= Joseph Ouatebot =

Central African politician, diplomat and teacher (born 1926)

Ambassador of Central African Republic to the Republic of China
- In office 1971–1973
- President: Jean-Bédel Bokassa
- Succeeded by: Simon Pierre Kibanda

Member of National Assembly
- In office 1960–?

Personal details
- Born: 9 September 1926 Bobangui, Ubangi-Shari (present-day Central African Republic)
- Party: MESAN
- Occupation: Teacher; Politician; Diplomat

Joseph Ouatebot (born 9 September 1926) is a Central African politician, diplomat and teacher.

== Life and career ==
Born in Bobangui on 9 September 1926, Ouatebot became a teacher on 1 April 1943 and was posted in Carnot. On 25 September 1951, he became a member of the Mbaïki municipal council. Dacko appointed Ouatebot as minister of home affairs on 13 October 1959, a position that he served until 31 August 1960. On 25 September 1960, he was elected as a member of National Assembly from the MESAN party. Within the National Assembly, he was assigned as the vice president of the foreign affairs and national defense committee.

Ouatebot was elected as the president of Société mutuelle de développement rural (Mutual Society for Rural Development) of Mbaiki branch on 5 January 1961. Apart from that, he also became a member of the Economic and Social Council from 9 October 1962 to 1 January 1966. In the 1964 election, Ouatebot was reelected as a member of the National Assembly. Upon the successful coup in early January 1966, he and Alphonse Iro were the earliest National Assembly members who endorsed Bokassa.

Ouatebot was appointed as the director of information and press from 23 January 1967 to 20 January 1969. In May 1970, he was posted in the Central African Republic Embassy in Brussels as deputy head of mission and served in that position and served that position for one year. Afterward, Bokassa appointed Ouatebot as the Ambassador of the Central African Republic to the Republic of China in September 1971 and arrived in Taiwan on 1 May 1972. He then returned to the Central African Republic and worked as the director of the periodical Soukoula in 1974. On 12 September 1976, he was named as the director general of the Agence centrafricaine de presse (ACAP).

== Personal life ==
Ouatebot is married.

== Awards ==
- Officer of Central African Orders of Academic Palms - 1 May 1972.
- , Officer Order of Central African Merit – 1 December 1975.
