= Joseph-Gilbert Mamadou =

Central African diplomat and bureaucrat

Ambassador of Central African Republic to Zaire
- In office September 1973 – ?
- President: Jean-Bédel Bokassa

Ambassador of Central African Republic to the Soviet Union
- In office June 1970 – July 1973
- President: Jean-Bédel Bokassa
- Preceded by: Auguste Mboe

Ambassador of Central African Republic to France
- In office 20 May 1966 – 21 June 1967
- President: Jean-Bédel Bokassa
- In office 10 December 1960 – 19 December 1963
- President: David Dacko

Ambassador of Central African Republic to the People Republic of China
- In office 1965–1966
- President: David Dacko; Jean-Bédel Bokassa
- Preceded by: Office established

Chief of Bocaranga district
- In office 31 December 1958 – c. May 1961
- Preceded by: Alphonse Ongagou
- Succeeded by: Antoine Dembet (sub-prefect)

Personal details
- Born: 16 July 1932 Kembe, Ubangi-Shari (now the present-day Central African Republic)
- Died: 1980 (aged 47-48)
- Spouse: Bernadette Abiali-Mondi

Joseph-Gilbert Mamadou (16 July 1932 - 1980), also known as Fangassa, was a Central African diplomat and bureaucrat.

== Biography ==
=== Early life and career ===
Belonging to Ngabaka, Mamadou was born on 16 July 1932 in Kembe. He entered the French Equatorial Africa public service in medical aid in 1946. In 1948, he served as a finance clerk for six years. He then moved to Bouar and worked as a postal agent in 1954.

Boganda appointed Mamadou as a Minister of education and health, a position he served from 14 May 1957 to 8 December 1958. On 31 December 1958, he was designated as a Chief of the Bocaranga district and served it until May 1961. Meanwhile, he also represented Central Africa to the French Community in Paris from 17 May to 1 September 1960.

Dacko appointed Mamadou as the head of the presidential cabinet in September 1960. On 10 December 1960, Dacko named Mamadou as Ambassador of the Central African Republic to France, a position he served until 19 December 1963. Upon returning to Bangui, he was appointed as the Ministry of Foreign Affairs Secretary-General on 12 January 1964. Mamadou was picked as the first ambassador of the Central African Republic to the People's Republic of China in 1965 and arrived in Beijing on 12 December. Less than a month after arriving in Beijing, he and his staff left China on 10 January 1966 after Bokassa broke off diplomatic ties with China on 6 January.

Bokassa reappointed Mamadou as the Ambassador to France on 20 May 1966 and he served it until 21 June 1967. Afterwards, he worked as an economic adviser to Bokassa in 1967. Bokassa posted Mamadou at the Central African embassy in Japan on 22 March 1969 to serve as its commercial adviser. He then was named as the Ambassador to the Soviet Union in June 1970 and presented his credentials in the Kremlin on 30 June. While serving as Ambassador to the Soviet Union, he was also accredited to Poland and Czechoslovakia. He then stepped down as Ambassador to the Soviet Union in July 1973. He left Moscow on 9 July. In September 1973, Bokassa appointed Mamadou as Ambassador to Zaire. On 26 September 1979, Dacko named Mamadou as the secretary-general and head of the prime minister’s cabinet.

=== Death and personal life ===
Mamadou died in 1980. He married Bernadette Abiali-Mondi on 13 September 1963.

== Award ==
- , Officer Order of Central African Merit – 1 December 1959.

== Bibliography ==
- Bradshaw, Richard; Rius, Juan Fandos (2016). Historical Dictionary of the Central African Republic (Historical Dictionaries of Africa). Lanham: Rowman & Littlefield.
