= Michel-Marie Mahelengamo =

Central African teacher and diplomat

Ambassador of Central African Republic to the People Republic of China
- In office 27 August 1976 – ?
- President: Jean-Bédel Bokassa

Ambassador of Central African Republic to France
- In office 17 February 1972 – 16 September 1972
- President: Jean-Bédel Bokassa

Ambassador of Central African Republic to Chad
- In office 1967 – 11 December 1972
- President: Jean-Bédel Bokassa

Personal details
- Born: 28 August 1930 (age 96) Douala, French Cameroon

Michel-Marie Mahelengamo (born 28 August 1930) is a Central African teacher and diplomat.

== Biography ==
Born on 28 August 1930 in Douala, Mahelengamo learned to become a priest at school. However, he worked as a teacher instead of becoming a priest. Later, he was promoted to serve as a school principal in Boda. On 1 October 1964, he entered the Ministry of Foreign Affairs. Two years later, the government posted Mahelengamo to Chad to serve as deputy head of mission.

Bokassa named Mahelengamo as an acting Ambassador of the Central African Republic to Chad from 1967 to 1968. Subsequently, he was designated as the Ambassador to Chad on 13 April 1968 and sent credential letters to François Tombalbaye in early June. He served as the Ambassador to Chad until 11 December 1971.

Upon stepping down as Ambassador to Chad, Mahelengamo was appointed as the Ambassador of the Central African Republic to France on 17 February 1972, a position that he served until 16 September. Subsequently, he served as deputy secretary-general of the foreign affairs ministry. Furthermore, he also served as director general of public service, replacing Jean-Marie Yollot. On 27 August 1976, Mahelengamo was named as the Ambassador of the Central African Republic to the People's Republic of China and South Korea based on the recommendation from Antonio Frank Gabriel. He also served as the Director General of the Central African Social Security Office (OCSS).

== Personal life ==
Mahelengamo is married.

== Award ==
- , Officer Order of Central African Merit – 23 January 1967.

== Bibliography ==
- Bradshaw, Richard; Rius, Juan Fandos (2016). Historical Dictionary of the Central African Republic (Historical Dictionaries of Africa). Lanham: Rowman & Littlefield.
