= Gansu delegation to the National People's Congress =

Gansu Delegation to the National People's Congress
- 全国人民代表大会甘肃省代表团
- Delegation for the National People's Congress
- Map showing the location of Qinghai Province
- Electoral unit: Gansu Province
- Population: 25,019,831

Current Delegation
- Created: 1954
- Seats: 52
- Head of delegation: Hu Changsheng
- Provincial People's Congress: Gansu Provincial People's Congress

The Gansu delegation to the National People's Congress is a delegation composed of deputies representing Gansu Province in within the National People's Congress (NPC), the highest organ of state power of the People's Republic of China. NPC deputies from Gansu Province are officially elected by the Gansu Provincial People's Congress.

== List of deputies ==
Year	NPC sessions	Deputies	Number of deputies	Ref.
1954	1st	Ren Qian, Wu Hongbin, Xing Zhaotang, Zhou Youcai, Sun Diancai, Ma Shaowen, Ma Xiwu, Ma Hongbin, Ma Tengai, Zhang Zhongliang, Zhang Zhizhong, Zhang Desheng, Guo Menghe, Chen Chengyi, Sheng Tongsheng, Huang Zhengqing, Yang Ziheng, Yang Mingxuan, Yang Fuxing, Yang Jingren, Dalizhaya, Deng Baoshan, Zheng Lizhai, Huo Weide, Xue Wanxiang		
1959	2nd	Deng Baoshan, Ren Qian, Wang Dechang, Li Hanyuan, Chen Peihua (female), Zhang Zhizhong, Gao Jianjun, Ma Yong, Ma Qingnian, Ma Hongbin, Guo Menghe, Huang Zhengqing, Yang Mingxuan, Yang Fuxing, Yang Chengzhong, Yang Jingren, Jiang Cisheng, Huo Weide, Wei Yuying (female)		
1964	3rd	Ding Zhanhai, Ma Quande, Ma Qingnian, Ma Dunjing, Ma Dekui, Wang Shi, Niu Caishidan, Mao Pengfei, Deng Baoshan, Kong Xianwu, Feng Yulan, Bai Chaoran, Jiang Longji, Shen Huasheng, Shen Zhiyang, Wang Feng, Wande, Li Wenbin, Li Qiyang, Li Kuishun, Li Jinglan, Li Landing, Li Hanyuan, Yang Wanlin, Yang Mingxuan, Yang Fuxing, Yang Chengzhong, Wu Hongbin, He Quanzhen, He Bingyan, Zhang Hanhao, Zhang Kao, Zhang Huiqing, Chen Peihua, Chen Chuping, Chen Shunyao, Zheng Guochang, Ramshdan, Luo Jun, Hu Jizong, Hu Xikui, Gao Jianjun, Guo Menghe, Xia Xingshi, Weng Wenbo, Qian Yuge, Chang Shuhong, Jiang Cisheng, Han Liancheng, Han Rongxin, Pan Zili, Fan Yuzhen		
1975	4th	Ding Tengfang, Bu Xiangui, Cairang Zhuoma (female, Tibetan), Ma Baigeye (female, Dongxiang), Ma Guangzong (Hui), Ma Weiru, Wang Feiyue (Bao'an), Wang Shitai, Wang Xiulan (female), Wang Guorui, Wang Rongcai, Wang Shuzhen (female), Tian Yi (female), Feng Guanyou, Feng Xiuzhen (female), Liu Weisheng, Xu Cungui, Xu Ruilan (female), Su Fengmei (female), Su He (Mongolian), Li Yongqing, Li Fangyuan, Li Zuorong (female), Li Peiqi, Yang Hanlie, Yang Xiulan (female), Qiu Yuncai, Qiu Yumin, Song Xuewu, Zhang Zhennan, Xian Henghan (Zhuang), Zheng Guochang, Zhao Danping (female), Yu Guimin (Hui), Hou Jinwei, Xia Fengying (female), Guo Tianshun, Guo Yingxiang (Yugur), Cao Xueli, Qi Yuzhen (female), Dong Yunlin, Jiang Cisheng, Zhi Jincai, Jin Chuanlian		
1978	5th	Cairang Zhuoma, Ma Guangzong, Maksumi, Ma Xuelan, Wang Shitai, Wang Ying, Wang Hailin, Gan Suqin, Feng Jixin, Sima Xugou, Zaiha, Zhu Xiunan, Liu Yuxiu, Liu Yingze, Qi Dingkuan, Yan Shutang, Li Youjiu, Li Zhuanrong, Yang Wanchun, Yang Hanlie, Yang Xinsheng, Yang Chengzhong, Min Chenglong, Song Ping, Zhang Fengwen, Zhang Jinbang, Zhang Yingbing, Chen Henghui, Chen Yaowu, Labuji, Shang Baotang, Jin Jianzhong, Zhou Ronghua, Zheng Guochang, Zhao Guoxin, Nan Yufeng, Yu Yanxiu, Gao Shucun, Gao Xuelin, Gao Xueyong, Gao Longqing, Guo Zengjian, Sangmuteng, Huang Wenzhong, Gong Shuqiao, Chang Shuhong, Sheng Deshan, Kang Kai, Ge Shiying, Jiang Cisheng, Ceden, Fu Dengdian, Jin Chuanlian, Fan Yuzhen		
1983	6th	Ma Shaoqing, Ma Guangzong, Ma Guoquan, Ma Junde, Wang Shitai, Wang Xiuyu, Wang Yizhi, Wang Suxiang, Lu Shiren, Zhu Xuanren, Ren Tianhua, Ren Zhenying, Liu Youcheng, Liu Yan, An Yulin, Du Yali, Du Ying, Li Xuexi, Li Chongzheng, Li Dengying, Yang Zhengmin, Yang Hanlie, Yang Zhengmei, Yang Jingren, Yang Chengzhong, Wu Yuanqing, He Hongfa, Zhang Yu'e, Zhang Ruyuan, Zhang Jinbang, Zhang Xingheng, Zhang Honglin, Zhang Zhixiang, Chen Guangyi, Chen Huizhen, Chen Jianhong, Lamao Daoheng, Fan Xipeng, Du Dachang, Jiang Xingzhang, Tong Ruolan, Luo Mingyue, Xue Jinda		
1988	7th	Ma Fengying, Ma Rulin, Wang Guizhen, Wang Deyong, Deng Chengcheng, Lu Kejian, Zhu Wenyu, Zhu Xuanren, Liu Lanting, Liu Bing, Liu Ruo, Liu Yan, Sun Aiping, Li Gongshou, Li Ping, Song Ping, Zhang Kerang, Zhang Yan, Chen Guozhang, Chen Xu, Chen Yaoren, Ou Qingyu, Yilajumei, Meng Xianshen, Zhao Xin, Ke Maosheng, Yao Shunguo, He Jingnong, Bandiya, Tong Shubao, Jia Zhijie, Chai Junzhen, Ni Anmin, Xu Shanghe, Gao Dengying, Cao Tongwei, Dong Songjiang, Han Tiecheng, Jiao Shanmin, Lai Xuezhong, Cai Fucheng, Xiong Fangqing, Wei Yuying		
1993	8th	Ding Zesheng, Ma Yugui, Ma Bangcai, Ma Jincui, Ma Jingyu, Wang Yongyin, Wang Guoliang, Wang Jiada, Wang Fucheng, Lu Kejian, Qi Maozhong, An Feng, Xu Feiqing, Sun Yifeng, Sun Ying, Li Wanlin, Li Wencheng, Li Jijun, Yang Xiaoqin, Yang Liqing, Yang Jinyi, Yang Deru, Wu Jinheng, Zhang Wule, Chen Keyan, Chen Yaoren, Zheng Jinxia, Zhao Junmou, Hao Hongtao, Ke Maosheng, Habuselemu, Nie Dajiang, Jia Zhijie, Gu Jun, Gu Jinchi, Ni Anmin, Guo Xilian, Tao Jinmei, Yan Haiwang, Han Xiuguo, Wen Jiabao, Dewacang, Wei Baowen		
1998	9th	Ding Zesheng (Hui), Ma Guochang (Hui), Ma Xiangmei (Bao'an), Ma Honglie, Wang Guowen, Wang Jintang, Wang Suyin, Lu Kejian (Tibetan), Shen Xiaozeng, Bai Shuzhen (Dongxiang), Feng Yunhai, Zhu Zhiliang, Zhu Zuoyong, Zhu Lianbao, Zhong Zhaolong, Qi Wenyan, An Yonghong (Yugur), Sun Ying, Li Ziqi, Li Fashen, Li Chunying (Hui), Yang Jinyi, Yang Sen (Hui), Zhang Hailan, Chen Shoujie, Chen Xueheng, Zhao Jinbao, Zhao Baosheng, Hao Xiaoling, Hou Dianlu, Rao Fengzhu, Yao Tandong, Nie Dajiang, Ni Anmin, Xu Shuanlong, Gao Wenhua, Gao Jinrong, Gao Fu, Guo Kun, Yan Haiwang, Dong Shufang, Dong Xihai, Jiang Yandong, Wen Jiabao, Jamyang Losang Jigme Thubten Chokyi Nyima (Tibetan), Dewacang (Tibetan)		
2003	10th	Ma Caiyun (female, Bao'an ethnicity), Ma Honglie, Wang Wenze, Wang Limin, Wang Xiwu (female), Shi Jing, Lu Kejian (Tibetan ethnicity), Feng Shiwei, Ren Jidong, Liu Weihong (female), Liu Lijun, An Yonghong (Yugur ethnicity), Sun Jie (female), Su Guanglin (Hui ethnicity), Li Fashen, Li Xi, Li Guoxun, Li Dingfan, Li Chong'an, Li Mei (female), Yang Huaixiao (Hui ethnicity), Yang Yurong, Yang Xiaoyan (female, Hui ethnicity), Song Zhaosu, Zhang Kaixun, Zhang Zhiyin, Zhang Jinliang, Lu Hao, Chen Xueheng, Chen Jianhua, Shao Kewen, Zhou Guoxun, Zhao Peng, Haqiong (female, Hui ethnicity), Yao Wencang, Xu Shousheng, Gao Wenhua, Guo Yufen (female), Sheng Weide, Yan Sanzhong, Dong Gang, Han Zhongxin, Cheng Zhengming, Cheng Youqing, Wen Jiabao, Lei Jufang (female), Jamyang Losang Jigme Thubten Chokyi Nyima (Tibetan ethnicity), Mu Tao (female, Dongxiang ethnicity)		
2008	11th	Yu Hongzhi (female), Ma Shaomin (female, Hui), Ma Guangming (Hui), Ma Hanlan (female, Dongxiang), Ma Xiaoqin (female, Bao'an), Wang Yi, Wang Qingfen (female), Wang Xiyu, Zuo Zongguo, Feng Jianshen, Feng Hairong (female), Bi Hongzhen (female, Hui), Qiao Hanrong, Liu Dajiang, Liu Weiping, Liu Ji, Jiang Yiman (female), An Guofeng (Yugur), Xu Wenhai, Xu Hai, Mou Benli, Su Guanglin (Hui) Su Suipei (female), Li Ningping, Li Jianhua, Yang Zhiqiang, Wu Yuntian, Zhang Jinliang, Zhang Xusheng, Zhang Jinghui, Lu Hao, Chen Jianhua, Chen Geng, Wu Weidong, Zhou Duoming, Zhou Xuhong, Hu Hao, Hou Chang'an, Losang Lingzhi Dorje (Tibetan), Jia Yingchun (female), Xu Shousheng, Guo Yufen (female), Liang Mingyuan (Tibetan), Yu Baocai, Cheng Youqing, Wen Jiabao, Yu Haiyan, Jamyang Losang Jigme Thubten Chokyi Nyima (Tibetan)		
2013	12th	Ma Shizhong, Ma Bailing (Hui), Ma Guangming (Hui), Ma Shangying (Dongxiang), Ma Jianping (female, Hui), Ma Xuehua (female, Bao'an), Wang Sanyun, Wang Shengjun, Wang Zhenhuan (female), Mao Shengwu (Tibetan), Shi Shoufang, Tian Cheng, Bai Zhonghua (female, Hui), ~~Feng Jie~~, Xing Weizhi, ~~Lü~~ Huiqiang (female), Zhu Ji, Liu Yongfu, Liu Weiping, Liu Deshu, Xu Xilong, Li Jiamin, Yang Zhengping, Yang ~~Dong~~, Lian Ji, Wu Yuntian, He Lixia (Female), Zhang Lingping, Zhang Huiping (female), Zhang Qinhe, ~~Lu Wucheng~~, Lu Hao, Chen Wei (female), Chen Chuanshu, Chen Kegong, Luo Xiaohu, Zhou Xuhong, Zhou Qiang, Zheng Yajun, Zhao Chun, Zhao Mantang, Hu Hao, Hong Runqing (female), Hong Yi, Xia Hongmin, Guo Yufen (female), Chang Haixia (female, Yugur), Kang Ren, Liang Mingyuan (Tibetan), Peng Changcheng, Lei Tongxia (female), Yu Haiyan, Lu Zhiqiang, Jamyang Losang Jigme Thubten Chokyi Nyima (Tibetan)		
2018	13th	Ma Tianlong (Dongxiang), Ma Shizhong, Ma Bailing (Hui), Ma Limin (Hui), Ma Huiling (female, Hui), Ma Yinping (female), Wang Gang, Wang Xiulan (female), Wang Fenyan, Wang Xiyu, Wang Tao, Renqing Dongzhu (Tibetan), Danzhengcao (female, Tibetan), Tian Cheng, Zhu Yu, Zhu Ji, Liu Kun, Liu Zhongjun, Liu Changlin, Su Bomin, Su Haiming, Li Zhongke, Yang Yuanzhong, Yang Weijun, Yang Yan (female, Hui), Yang Xiaodu, Yang Hairong (female, Yugur), Yang Weijun, Wu Yangdong, Song Guanchang, Zhang Haibo, Zhang Zhijun, Zhang Jinlin, Fan Dongyun (female), Fan Peng, Lin Duo,~~Shang Lunsheng~~Zheng Caiqin (female), Jiang Chengying (female), Yuan Bin, Gao Buming, Gao Hucheng, Guo Yufen (female), Guo Mei (female), Tang Renjian, Tang Xiaoming, Huang Qiang, Kang Jun, Liang Qianjuan (female), Dong Caiyun (female, Bao'an ethnic group), Han Xianming, Fu Kangnian, Xie Shengrui, Jamyang Losang Jigme Thubten Chokyi Nyima (Tibetan ethnic group)		
2023	14th	Ma Bailing, Ma Limin, Ma Xiuying, Ma Huiling, Ma Yinping, Wang Zhongming, Wang Ke, Wang Xu, Wang Jun, Wang Yang, Wang Fu, Wang Pugong, Wang Wei, Yin Jianmin, Bai Xiaoyan, Feng Wenge, Lü Linbang, Ren Zhenhe, Liu Kai, Liu Jinfan, Yan Chunhua, Su Yuehua, Du Jun, Li Guangxia, Li Zhijun, Li Hongzhong, Yang Jianwu, Yang Zhenlin, Wu Wanhua, He Dong, Wang Wanfu, Shen Jian, Zhang Weiwen, Zhang Hongling, Zhang Zhongshan, Zhang Kebing, Chen Tianzhu, Chen Can, Fan Fei, Jin Rubin, Zhao Zhenxiang, Hu Changsheng, Huang Zeyuan, Liang Qianjuan, Dong Jianxin, Dong Caiyun, Han Lin, Lei Siwei, Jamyang Losang Jigme Thubten Chokyi Nyima, Lin Fanhong	52	
