= Shandong delegation to the National People's Congress =

Shandong Delegation to the National People's Congress
- 全国人民代表大会山东省代表团
- Delegation for the National People's Congress
- Map showing the location of Jiangsu Province
- Electoral unit: Shandong Province
- Population: 101,527,453

Current Delegation
- Created: 1954
- Seats: 173
- Head of delegation: Lin Wu
- Provincial People's Congress: Shandong Provincial People's Congress

The Shandong delegation to the National People's Congress is a delegation composed of deputies representing Shandong Province within the National People's Congress (NPC), the highest organ of state power of the People's Republic of China. NPC deputies from the Shandong Province are officially elected by the Shandong Provincial People's Congress.

== List of deputies ==
Year	NPC sessions	Deputies	Number of deputies	Ref.
1954	1st	Ding Ling, Ding Lüde, Wang Xuncai, Wang Meigong, Wang Zhuchen, Wang Jiaji, Wang Shenlin, Wang Tongzhao, Qiu Jin, Shi Dongshan, An Lifu, Zhu Xuefan, Jiang Longji, He Jifeng, Yu Xinqing, Wu Ruoyan, Wu Gaizhi, Lü Hongbin, Li Tianying, Li Shunzhang, Li Chengzhi, Shen Yanbing, Xin Zhichao, Xing Xiping, Zhou Ren, Lin Zun, Duan Junyi, Hu Ke, Hu Sheng, Hu Yaobang, Wei Que, Tang Liang, Xia Zhengnong, Sun Xiaocun, Xu Zuoxia, Chao Zhefu, Li Zaiwen, Hao Jianxiu, Cui De Xi, Zhang Tianmin, Zhang Gongzhi, Zhang Xiuyan, Zhang Boqiu, Zhang Hanying, Zhang Dongmu, Xu Zhizhen, Xu Dixing, Chen Shaomin, Chen Mengyuan, Chen Lei, Zeng Guangfu, Cheng Zihua, Tong Dizhou, Shu Tong, Hua Gang, Feng Yuanjun, Yang Kebing, Yang Chun, Dong Chuncai, Dong Yan, Zhao Dan, Zhao Zhiqiang, Liu Ziju, Liu Minsheng, Liu Tonggao, Liu Changsheng, Liu Ningyi, Teng Huchen, Deng Tuo, Qian Sanqiang, Qian Changzhao, Qian Ying, Yan Kuiyao, Xie Juecai, Han Liancheng, Wei Xiuying, Feng Yunhe: By-election on June 15, 1956: Zhao Jianmin, Li Guangwen, Wang Lubin, Lang Xianfen	77	
1959	2nd	Ding Lude, Wei Que, Wang Xuncai, Wang Meigong (female), Wang Shoudao, Wang Shenlin, Deng Tuo, Qiu Jin, Liu Ningyi, Liu Minsheng, Liu Changsheng, Liu Tonggao, Liu Xianzhe, Liu Huimin, Sun Xiaocun, Zhu Xuefan, Zhu Xi, Shen Yanbing, Xing Xiping, Li Kezuo, Li Shunzhang, Li Chengzhi, Chen Shaomin (female), Chen Mengyuan, Chen Lei, Wu Defeng, Lü Hongbin, Yu Xinqing, Gu Mu, Lin Zun, Zhang Tianmin, Zhang Gongzhi, Zhang Zhaomei, Zhang Hanying, Zhang Xi, Jin Baozhen, Jin Ming, Zhou Ren, Zhao Dan, Hu Sheng, Hu Yaobang Fan Wenlan, Fan Shiren, Lang Xianfen (female), Hao Jianxiu (female), Xia Yan, Xia Nai, Chao Zhefu, Xu Shigao, Xu Yunbei, Xu Zuoxia, Xu Jianchun (female), Xu Meisheng, Xu Zhizhen, Guo Yonghuai, Guo Yicheng, Kang Sheng, Bi Dexian, Cui Dexi, Tong Dizhou, Feng Yuanjun (female), Zeng Shan, Shu Tong, Yang Dezhi, Yang Yunyu (female), Dong Bian (female), Zang Kejia, Cai Banghua, Teng Jinglu, Qian Zhiguang, Qian Changzhao, Qian Ying (female), Xie Juecai, Wei Xiuying (female), Tan Qilong, Feng Yunhe (female)	77	
1964	3rd	Ding Laifu, Ding Lude, Yu Huahu, Ma Chuzhen, Fang Zongxi, Wang Yunsheng, Wang Yude, Wang Youping, Wang Guangwei, Wang Hua, Wang Xu, Wang Peizhen, Wang Xuncai, Wang Meigong, Wang Baorong, Wang Shenlin, Wang Jiechen, Wang Baoren, Wang Lei, Wang Deming, Dan Tong, Deng Biyi, Kong Huaxuan, Kuang Rennong, Feng Yuanjun, Feng Yanchen, Shi Jianyang, Ye Lianjun, Ye Xuechi, Ye Debei, Shi Tong, Bai Rubing, Bai Jimei, Jiang Qing, Liu Changsheng, Liu Minsheng, Liu Jialin, Liu Tonggao, Liu Xianzhe, Liu Chengxian, Liu Shengxin, Liu Huimin, Liu Zhibai, Guan Feng, Xu Yijiao, Xu Jizeng, Cheng Fangwu, Qu Yi, Qu Yingzhou, Lü Hongbin, Zhu Xuefan, Zhu Hongyuan, Zhu Mei, Ren Lunsheng, Sun Wenming, Sun Yunluan, Sun Yunzhu, Sun Yusheng, Sun Huisheng, Sun Huaiyi, Sun Xiaocun, Sun Hongquan, Sun Xiang, Shen Yanbing, Shen Jun, Song Yuqing, Yan Zhongping, Su Yingkuan, Li Fengying, Li Zhengjia, Li Tianying, Li Chunming, Li Yanfang, Li Minhua, Li Chengzhi, Yang Hanzhang, Yang Yachao, Yang Dezhi, Yang Jiachi, Yang Yunyu, Wu Shikai, Wu Wanggan, Wu Shuoping, Wu Suxuan, Wu Defeng, Yu Xinqing, Yu Guanying, Gu Mu, He Shouan, Zhang Tianmin, Zhang Gongzhi, Zhang Langge, Zhang Zhengyi, Zhang Rumei, Zhang Zhaomei, Zhang Shengya, Zhang Hanying, Zhang Kai, Zhang Yan, Zhang XiZhang Shumei, Zhang Fugui, Zhang Puyun, Zhang Jingtao, Zhang Huilan, Lu Weixin, Chen Shaomin, Chen Puxian, Chen Zhijing, Chen Hao, Chen Lei, Chen Ruitai, Zheng Fengrong, Zheng Bolin, Zheng Linfan, Lang Xianfen, Jin Baozhen, Jin Xiaoxian, Zhou Ren, Zhou Xing, Zhou Xilai, Zhou Jianglan, Zhou Zupeng, Gong Fucheng, Zhao Dan, Zhao Lanying, Hao Jianxiu, Hao Fujian, Hu Peng, Duan Yi, Yao Zhouqi, Ling Yun, Gao Yangwen, Gao Dengyan, Guo Yonghuai, Guo Shouming, Guo Yujing, Guo Tong, Guo Yicheng, Qin Jie, Yuan Yelie, Jia Zhen Xia Yan, Xia Nai, Gu Dingxiang, Gu Maolin, Chao Zhefu, Qian Zhiguang, Qian Changzhao, Qian Linzhao, Xu Shigao, Xu Wenyuan, Xu Chenglong, Xu Zuoxia, Xu Jianchun, Xu Meisheng, Kang Sheng, Gai Yufeng, Xiao Difeng, Cui Wei, Cui Dexi, Tong Dizhou, Xian Shujin, Zeng Guangfu, Zeng Shan, Zeng Ziyin, Zeng Chengkui, Dong Bian, Dong Ruqin, Fu Shengchang, Fu Zengju, Tan Qilong, He Chongben, Cai Banghua, Cai Xiuben, Zang Kejia, Fan Houfu, Xue Tingyao, Xue Chushu, Mu Ruiwu, Dai Songen, Wei Bin, Qu Chengquan	183	
1975	4th	Ding Yousheng, Yu Haiting, Ma Chuanxiang, Wang Guangqian, Wang Jide, Wang Zhuquan, Wang Xingmin, Wang Xiuhua, Wang Shufang, Wang Ruimei, Niu Guangchun, Kong Xianzhang, Shen Yuren, Tian Lizhu, Tian Lijun, Bai Rubing, Cheng Fangwu, Bi Xiulan, Qu Zhenhai, Lü Yilan, Lü Chengde, Lü Hongbin, Qiao Shijun, Liu Taizhen, Liu Xianzhe, Liu Peirong, Liu Jinhai, Liu Baoyong, Liu Chimei, Liu Xiangtuan, Liu Cuiying, Qi Faheng, Jiang Qing, Xu Chengde, Sun Huisheng, Sun Songyi, Sun Yankun, Sun Dechang, Yan Ligan, Li Yunju, Li Yuhua, Li Chenghua, Li Huade, Li Huifeng, Li Lianhong, Li Farui, Li Chunsheng, Li Shengrong, Li Dezhi, Yang Ren Zhong, Yang Yuchun, Yang Polan, Yang Yi, Bu Jun, Wu Guiyun, Qiu Honggui, He Damei, Gu Guilan, Song Minghan, Zhang Shizhong, Zhang Lanying, Zhang Yancheng, Zhang Zhiwen, Zhang Jinping, Zhang Jincheng, Zhang Baofu, Zhang Chengliang, Zhang Guizeng, Zhang Hongsheng, Zhang Hongling, Chen Wenzhong, Chen Yimei, Chen Puxian, Chen Chengshan, Fan Guojiang, Lin Ping, Zhou Yunpu, Zhou Guilan, Shan Jianhua, Lang Xianfen, Zhao Yuying, Zhao Liyun, Zhao Lanying, Zhao Ximei, Hao Huaiyou, Hao Xuede, Hu Yinghong, Duan Liangui, Hou Zhenmin, Gong Fucheng, Fei Liying, Yao Shichang, Qin Yulin, Yuan Shengtang, Gu Maolin, Gao Heng, Chang Guanyu, Kang Yonghe, Lu Daoping, Gai Yufeng,Peng Shijie, Dong Jinfu, Dong Lingzhen, Han Zaisheng, Han Xiuyun, Han Shuying, Fu Chunfa, Zeng Chengkui, Pei Xiangting, Yan Hongyu, Xue Zhaoliang, Mu Lin	112	
1978	5th	Ding Faqin, Ding Chunlan, Ding Ji'en, Ding Zhaokui, Yu Haiting, Ma Tong'en, Ma Yiquan, Ma Xiangrong, Ma Zhaowei, Wang Yongxing, Wang Youping, Wang Shouchun, Wang Xiuhua, Wang Meigong, Wang Bingqin, Wang Honghai, Wang Guiqin, Wang Aizhen, Wang Ying, Fang Zongxi, Gan Meirong, Shen Yuren, Tian Lizhu, Bai Rubing, Cong Fuze, Feng Yongxi, Feng Zhanjuan, Lan Zhipu, Pi Zhixian, Lü Hongbin, Zhu Benzheng, Zhu Qimin, Zhu Xuefan, Cheng Fangwu, Ren Yuexu, Liu Gan, Liu Minsheng, Liu Xianzhe, Liu Zhihai, Liu Kexian, Liu Huaihe, Liu Binglin, Liu Xianting, Liu Duanrong, Qi Faheng, Jiang Ruiming, Sun Yusheng, Sun Huisheng, Sun Zhijian, Sun Xueyou Sun Chengmei, Sun Shule, Sun Fumei, Sun Dechang, Mou Yutian, Ji Xiuzhi, Su Ziyan, Su Yingkuan, Li Zichao, Li Rensong, Li Yuhua, Li Chenghua, Li Huifeng, Li Shouzhong, Li Xiufen, Li Farui, Li Chunsheng, Li Ruling, Li Shengrong, Li Aichang, Li Shuzhen, Li Daochang, Li Dezhi, Yang Renzhong, Yang Pizhi, Yang Ligong, Yang Lianke, Yang Mingqi, Xiao Dejin, Wu Kegang, He Jiakeng, Gu Mu, Gu Guilan, Wang Yunxiu, Shen Huiji, Shen Yanbing, Chi Jingde, Zhang Shicai, Zhang Langge, Zhang Tingzhong, Zhang Rudong, Zhang Jinping, Zhang Chengzai, Zhang Chunhua, Zhang Xuanmin, Zhang Guiyun, Zhang Yanxia, Chen Puxian, Chen Xiaoshun, Chen BaoyouWu Yuqiang, Fan Guojiang, Fan Meilan, Lin Chuanzhen, Zhou Liting, Zhou Jiamei, Zhou Yunpu, Zhou Xilai, Zhou Aizhu, Zheng Ziju, Zheng Xingzhai, Lang Xianfen, Zhao Yuying, Zhao Lanying, Zhao Shoufu, Hu Anfu, Hu Xiaoju, Duan Liangui, Rao Manni, Yao Shichang, Qin Hezhen, Xia Ming, Xia Baoshu, Gu Maolin, Xu Wenyuan, Xu Liying, Xu Meisheng, Xu Guiyue, Xu Qian, Gao Wenli, Gao Guofu, Gao Xiu, Gao Zhenxiang, Gao Fengwu, Guo Jinming, Guo Shaoyi, Guo Yicheng, Chang Lihua, Chang Guanyu, Cui Tingliang, Peng Meigeng, Han Zaisheng, Han Xiuyun, Cheng Chunshan, Fu Changyun, Fu Chunfa, Fu Zengju, Zeng Chengkui, Xie Xinhe, Pei Xiangting, Tan Qiwang, Pan Chengdong, Huo Chuancai, Wei Guangmu, Wei Zhengting	155	
1983	6th	Ding Yunpeng, Ding Shouchu, Ding Shujian, Ding Chunlan, Ding Hongwang, Ding Fusong, Yu Bohai, Yu Chao, Ma Xiangrong, Ma Xiju, Ma Zhaowei, Wang Jinwu, Wang Yongxing, Wang Renzhi, Wang Shouchun, Wang Fu, Wang Xiumei, Wang Chuitai, Wang Shouwen, Wang Qin, Wang Jifu, Wang Aihua, Wang Huifang, Wang Xishu, Wang Dianchen, Wang Tao, Wang Zengdu, Wang Yaosheng, Niu Huifu, Niu Liang, Fang Guoxi, Fang Zongxi, Shi Zhenrong, Lu Xiuxin, Shuai Defu, Shen Yuren, Feng Yongxi, Feng Zhimin, Feng Zhanjuan, Ning Dehua, Pi Zhixian, Qu Zhilian, Lü Faji, Lü Jiaqiang, Lü Hongbin, Zhu Ling, Ren Zhongkuan, Ren Duanyu, Liu Shilan, Liu Lanying, Liu Xian Zhi, Liu Xingwu, Liu Hongben, Liu Zuochang, Liu Dunren, Liu Ruiyu, Jiang Shi, Jiang Ruiming, Jiang Nan, Xu Yuhui, Sun Fengqin, Sun Shujiu, Sun Zhenxian, Sun Cuiying, Ji Xiuzhi, Su Hongsheng, Su Jingliang, Li Qiwan, Li Qiuhua, Li Zhongping, Li Hongnai, Li Ye, Li Qingmin, Li Shuzhen, Li Huizong, Li Shanxiu, Yang Jiuzhen, Yang Ligong, Yang Mingqi, Yang Honggui, Yang Zhenjuan, Xiao Yanxiong, Qiu Shuyun, He Zaoying, Gu Yuanye, Xin Xianling, Wang Yunxiu, Song Xiangzhu, Chi Minqi, Zhang Shenyi, Zhang Chengxian, Zhang Chunhua, Zhang Hongrong, Zhang Haitao, Zhang Meilin, Zhang Demin, Chen Kaiming, Chen Yuguang, Chen Puxian, Chen XingzhiChen Jinxiang, Chen Zongzhao, Shao Changzhu, Shao Langjun, Wu Jisan, Yuan Yaokun, Lin Chuanzhen, Lin Hong, Ouyang Guanghua, Jin Zhizhong, Jin Sufu, Zhou Binghong, Pang Liansheng, Zheng Jiandong, Zheng Junmin, Zheng Xichang, Feng Jushang, Zhao Yonggui, Zhao Shoufu, Zhao Ximing, Zhao Ruilin, Zhao Deju, Jing Xiuying, Xian Ronghai, Hou Benting, Jiang Liancang, Jiang Fuxin, Qin Hezhen, Gu Zhendong, Dang Baoshi, Xu Wenyuan, Xu Peiran, Xu Xuehan, Xu Xuejuan, Xu Meisheng, Weng Weiquan, Gao Zhongzheng, Gao Keting, Gao Laitong, Gao Qiyun, Guo Jinming, Guo Yicheng, Tang Jianwen, Huang Daonong, Huang Xinghan, Cao Xianting, Chang Lihua, Cui Jiufeng, Kang Yingzong, Zhang Zongjiang, Liang Buting, Liang Shuwei, Peng Meigeng, Dong Lingde, Dong Yongxiang, Jiang Shihe, Jiang Zhijian, Jiang Furui, Han Yuqun, Fu Shaosi, Fu Zengju, Tong Hezu, Tong Jianhao, Zeng Wenwu, Zeng Chengkui, Xie Hongsheng, Lu Buyan, Dou Fulin, Pan Chengdong, Xue Xiang, Dai Shenglan, Wei Yannian, Wei Jianyi	173	
1988	7th	Ding Shujian, Ding Guiying, Yu Xining, Ma Shanlun, Wang Shiyong, Wang Yongxing, Wang Wei, Wang Renzhi, Wang Zhimin, Wang Xiuting, Wang Huaiyuan, Wang Jiangong, Wang Chunshu, Wang Qin, Wang Genyuan, Wang Daoyu, Wang Weitian, Wang Zengdu, Wang Yaosheng, Mao Binyao, Wu Yigong, Fang Rongxiang, Kong Fanlu, Shi Zhenrong, Long Shouxin, Lu Xiuxin, Lu Xinhua, Feng Yisheng, Feng Zhanjuan, Si Zhijie, Zhu Guanxing, Zhu Ling, Ren Jiyu, Zhuang Wan, Liu Yuhua, Liu Bingyin, Liu Lanying, Liu Yanmin, Liu Hongren, Liu Zuochang, Jiang Shi, Jiang Ruiming, Xu Yuhui, Sun Libin, Sun Huaxin, Sun Cuiying, Mou Chengze, Ji Yujun, Yan Dafan, Li Shixian, Li Da Nian, Li Wenquan, Li Yuhai, Li Keqi, Li Hou, Li Anle, Li Guorui, Li Mingxian, Li Xuezhi, Li Zhongping, Li Zhen, Li Xiangling, Li Qingmin, Li Shuping, Li Yushu, Li Diankui, Yang Jiuzhen, Yang Bo, Yang Qiuping, Yang Shuying, Yang Mianmian, Wu Keyang, Qiu Tiekai, Yu Songlie, Xin Xianling, Wang Yunxiu, Zhang Ziming, Zhang Wenyan, Zhang Wenqing, Zhang Jiayu, Zhang Shenyi, Zhang Bangyuan, Zhang Tongsheng, Zhang Chengxian, Zhang Shuci, Zhang Hongying, Zhang Liulin, Lu Guangting, Chen Kaiming, Chen Puxian, Chen Jinxiang, Chen Weizhen, Shao Guifang, Shao Langjun, Ouyang Guanghua, Ji Wanzhen, Yue Guilan, Jin Lanying, Jin Zhizhong, Jin SufuZhou Junmin, Zhou En, Pang Liansheng, Zheng Yitang, Zheng Junmin, Meng Hong, Zhao Linshan, Zhao Duxue, Zhao Xinsheng, Hao Bin, Hu Hongzhi, Hu Zhenguo, Hu Fucai, Xian Ronghai, Duan Jianqin, Hou Guoben, Yu Zhengsheng, Jiang Wanxi, Jiang Shouzhi, Jiang Liancang, Jiang Chunyun, He Xuesheng, He Jingzhi, Qin Yun, Qin Canshi, Mo Wenxiang, Chai Shufan, Dang Baoshi, Qian Jiaxiao, Ni Zhifu, Xu Wenyuan, Xu Gongqing, Xu Yingquan, Xu Fashui, Xu Jianshi, Xu Leijian, Xi Xia, Gao Zhongzheng, Gao Zhihua Gao Keting, Gao Yaoxuan, Guo Changcai, Guo Songnian, Guo Aizhen, Tang Houyun, Tao Li, Huang Yi, Huang Peiwei, Huang Daonong, Mei Lisheng, Qi Qizhang, Chang Zonglin, Cui Jiufeng, Cui Yunsheng, Kang Yingzong, Zhang Zongjiang, Yan Qijun, Liang Shuwei, Peng Diande, Peng Zhenli, Dong Fanyu, Jiang Shihe, Jiang Zhijian, Han Zhonghai, Han Di, Han Yuqun, Cheng Yuanhe, Fu Shaosi, Fu Zengju, Zeng Wenwu, Zeng Chengkui, Xie Hongsheng, Zhai Yongbo, Zhai Shoucai, Pan Chengdong, Dai Shenglan, Wei Yannian, Wei Jianyi	178	
1993	8th	Ding Yixin, Ding Guiying, Wan Shanshan, Ma Zhongcai, Ma Guoqiang, Ma Xuefu, Wang Dahai, Wang Fuxian, Wang Youchang, Wang Renyuan, Wang Weimin, Wang Yongxing, Wang Tingjiang, Wang Tingchu, Wang Zhizhong, Wang Li (female, Hui), Wang Xiujun, Wang Genyuan, Wang Tao, Wang Shanqing, Wang Weitian, Wang Xincheng, Wang Shuguang, Wei Danian (Zhuang), Mao Binyao, Wu Yigong, Bian Xianti, Yin Zhongxian, Yin Ping, Kong Fansheng, Ba Zhongtan, Lu Hong, Feng Yisheng, Qu Geping, Ren Jiyu, Xiang Yang, Zhuang Wan, Liu Wei, Liu Yanmin, Liu Xuchang, Liu Rongxi, Liu Lingcheng, Liu Weizhi, Guan Meihua, Tang Jiayong, Xu Wenhua, Xu Hongzhang, Sun Jifang, Sun Huaxin Sun Qiyu, Sun Cuiying, Sun Dehan, Mou Chengze, Ji Yujun, Du Rongjiu, Du Ailing, Du Defu, Li Shixian, Li Danian, Li Ge, Li Wenquan, Li Keqi, Li Tianzuo, Li Hou, Li Hongying, Li Xianjie, Li Mingxian, Li Xuezhi, Li Chengyou, Li Chunpu, Li Zhen, Li Gesen, Li Shuping, Li Jingchang, Li Denghai, Li Dezhen, Li Dezhang, Yang Chuantang, Yang Qiuping, Yang Jiajie, Yang Shuying, Yang Mianmian, Shi Lijun, Wu Guiben, Wu Longjiang, Qiu Tiekai, Yu Songlie, Yu Chenggang, Gu Jianfen, Xin Shoupu, Wang Xia, Song Xihuan, Zhang Qiaoyun, Zhang Zhengbin, Zhang Tongsheng, Zhang Huafu, Zhang Qingli, Zhang Shouye, Zhang Guolan, Zhang ZhipingZhang Shuci, Zhang Liulin, Zhang Min, Zhang Xiqing, Zhang Huijuan, Zhang Defeng, Zhang Ruling, Lu Junyi, Lu Xuan, Chen Shilian, Yuan Xianzhang, Lin Shuxiang, Lin Min, Jin Lanying, Jin Zhongying, Zhou Guangfu, Zhou Hongxing, Zhou Deshan, Meng Hong, Meng Hongxia, Meng Xianduo, Zhao Chuanxiang, Zhao Zhibing, Zhao Zhihao, Zhao Liangcai, Hao Jinran, Hao Jianzhi, Hu Hongzhi, Hu Zhenguo, Xiang Jianhai, Duan Jianqin, Yu Zhengsheng, Pang Xianzhi, Jiang Shouzhi, Jiang Chunyun, Jiang Jian, He Xuesheng, He Duanshi, Qin Yun, Qin Yao Ji, Qin Zhongda, Qin Canshi, Mo Wenxiang, Xia Lide, Xu Beiwen, Xu Yinsheng, Xi Xia, Weng Weiquan, Gao Renren, Gao Min, Guo Aizhen, Guo Xinzhang, Tang Yushan, Tang Houyun, Huang Yi, Huang Kehua, Huang Liqun, Huang Daonong, Cao Zhi, Qi Qizhang, Chang Zonglin, Cui Xuewen, Peng Diande, Peng Pai, Dong Fanyu, Han Xinmin, Han Zengqi, Cheng Hanbang, Fu Qingfu, Jiao Zuguang, Zeng Wenwu, Zeng Chengkui, Xie Yutang, Xie Lixin, Guan Huashi, Zhai Shoucai, Pan Chengdong, Dai Wenxia, Ju Junrui	179	
1998	9th	Ding Zhongping (Hui), Yu Xixin, Wan Shanshan, Ma Xianfu, Ma Zhongcai, Ma Jinzhong, Ma Si'ai (Hui), Wang Yixi, Wang Fuxian, Wang Youchang, Wang Yufen, Wang Yumei, Wang Gang, Wang Tingchu, Wang Yankang, Wang Shoudong, Wang Zhizhong, Wang Zhimin, Wang Li (female, Hui), Wang Xiujun, Wang Dianjiang, Wang Qicheng, Wang Tao, Wang Jiarui, Wang Jingdong, Wang Xinchun, Niu Huilan, Yin Yan, Deng Baojin, Shi Jun, Lu Linyuan, Tian Suhua, Tian Dequan, Feng Yisheng, Bi Sihai, Qu Geping, Zhu Changfu, Zhuang Wan, Liu Yifa, Liu Feng (Mongolian), Liu Fengxian, Liu Jiakun, Liu Wei, Liu Qingling, Liu Xuejing, Liu Zheng, Liu Tongxia, Liu Zhenya, Liu Xinguo (Mongolian), Guan Meihua, Jiang Baoan, Tang Jianmei (Hui), Tang Jiayong, Sun Shoupu, Sun Qiyu, Sun Maocai, Sun Yuanzheng, Sun Dehan, Mou Shuling, Ji Yujun, Su Shoutang, Du Shicheng, Du Defu, Li Changshun, Li Fengyun, Li Wenquan, Li Yumei, Li Tianzuo, Li Xiuying, Li Guoxian, Li Jianhua, Li Chunting, Li Chunpu, Li Xianting, Li Xuanmin, Li Hongxin, Li Li, Li Guixiang, Li Meifang, Li Jingchang, Li Denghai, Li Dezhang, Yang Xingfu, Yang Jinjing, Yang Qiuping, Yang Xiliu, Yang Shuying, Yang Mianmian, Lian Fang, Wu Weiping, Wu Tianwen, Wu Zehao, Wu Guanzheng, Qiu Weizheng, Yu Chenggang, Gu Jianfen, Zou Xianguang, Wang Xia, Song ShusenSong Yiqiao, Chi Yucai, Zhang Shiping, Zhang Fengxiang, Zhang Leling, Zhang Zhizheng, Zhang Tinggui, Zhang Zhikun, Zhang Jianguo, Zhang Jialing, Zhang Min, Zhang Rong, Zhang Huijuan, Chen Yongxing, Chen Guang, Chen Baochang, Chen Jian, Shao Fengjing, Lin Shuxiang, Jin Lanying (Hui), Jin Zhongying (Hui), Zhou Fengxian, Zhou Baifeng, Zhou Houjian, Zhou Hongxing, Zhou Yaoqi, Zheng Wansheng, Zheng Heping, Meng Hongxia, Meng Xianduo, Zhao Yulan, Zhao Yumei, Zhao Pingnian, Zhao Zhibing, Zhao Zhihao, Zhao Shucong, Zhao Hailing, Hao Jianzhi, Xiang Jianhai, Pang Xianzhi, Jiang Jian, Jiang Cuibo Gong Hongping, He Duanshi, Qin Canshi, Jia Wanzhi, Xia Lide, Chao Zhongsheng, Xu Yinsheng, Xi Xia (Manchu), Weng Weiquan, Gao Renren, Gao Mingyan, Guo Zhaoxin, Guo Yuejin, Guo Zheng, Tang Yushan, Tang Houyun, Yan Rongzhu, Huang Kehua, Huang Sheng, Huang Tao, Gong Yingzhen, Cui Xuewen, Cui Yuqian, Kang Fengying, Peng Kaizhou, Ge Hongsheng, Dong Yixiang, Dong Cuina, Jiang Minglin, Han Xikai, Zeng Wenchong, Zeng Chengkui, Wen Fujiang, Xie Yixing, Xie Yutang, Xie Lixin, Xie Jiaying, Cai Qiufang, Guan Huashi, Tan Fude, Zhai Shoucai, Huo Junping, Ju Limin	185	
2003	10th	Ding Yuhua, Ding Zhongping (Hui nationality), Yu Youmin, Yu Ning, Yu Jinming, Yu Jianyou, Yu Jiancheng, Yu Xiuping, Yu Baofa, Ma Xianfu, Ma Chunji, Wang Yuancheng, Wang Ning, Wang Gang, Wang Tingjiang, Wang Quanjie, Wang Shoudong, Wang Zhizhong, Wang Zhimin, Wang Li (female, Hui nationality), Wang Xiujun, Wang Qicheng, Wang Jinyou, Wang Ge, Wang Xiuzhi, Wang Tao (female), Wang Xinhong, Che Chunbin, Niu Huilan (female), Yin Zhongxian, Yin Yan (female), Yin Huimin (female), Ba Hongbin, Deng Baojin (female), Zuo Shenxiang, Bai Shichun, Feng Yisheng, Da Jianwen, Bi Sihai, Lü Zaimo, Zhu Changfu, Zhuang Wenzhong, Liu Yifa, Liu Feng (female, Mongolian nationality), Liu Fengxian (female), Liu Yuxiang, Liu Jiakun, Liu Kunzhou, Liu Guoxin, Liu Yan (female) Liu Xuejing, Liu Zongyuan, Liu Zheng, Liu Rongxi (Hui), Liu Weizhi, Liu Fuchun, Liu Xiqian, Liu Xinguo (Mongolian), Liu Huiyan, Guan Mali (female, Manchu), Jiang Linchang, Jiang Baoan, Tang Jianmei (female, Hui), An Shiyin, Xu Ruiju (female), Sun Pishu, Sun Yongchun, Sun Wei (female), Sun Liqiang, Sun Qiyu, Ji Yujun, Mai Kangsen, Su Shoutang, Du Changwen, Li Changshun, Li Shushen, Li Mingmin, Li Guoan, Li Guoxian (female), Li Jianhua, Li Jianjun, Li Chunting, Li Hongxin, Li Li (female), Li Mei (female), Li Meifang (female), Li Xueqin (female), Li Denghai, Yang Zhengwu, Yang Weicheng, Yang Chuansheng, Yang Xingfu, Yang Baoyou, Yang Mianmian (female), Lian Chengmin, Wu Zehao, Wu GuanzhengQiu Yafu, Gu Jianfen (female), Shen Zhiqiang, Song Wenxin (female), Song Yuanfang, Song Zuowen, Song Yiqiao, Zhang Jiuxun, Zhang Shiping, Zhang Caiqiu, Zhang Fengxian (female), Zhang Zhifa, Zhang Zhikun (female), Zhang Xuexin, Zhang Qiubo, Zhang Zhenxing, Zhang Guiyu, Zhang Gaoli, Zhang Min, Zhang Huilai, Zhang Ruisheng, Zhang Xinqi, Chen Yulan (female), Chen Huasen, Shao Fengjing (female), Wu Yuqiang, Lin Weining (female), Shang Ruifen (female), Guo Jiasen, Jin Lanying (female, Hui nationality), Jin Zhiguo, Zhou Fengxian, Zhou Qi, Zhou Houjian, Zhou Hongxing, Zhou Yaoqi, Lang Qingtian, Zhao Yulan (female), Zhao Zhiquan, Zhao Zhihao, Zhao Hailing (female) Zhao Shuping (female), Hao Jianzhi (female), Hu Dunxin, Xiang Jianhai, Duan Yihe, Yu Shuwei, Jiang Jian (female), Gong Xuebin, He Duan, Qin Yunshan, Yuan Jinghua (female), Mo Liqi, Jia Xueying, Xia Zuoli, Xia Chunting, Xia Geng, Ni Yongkang, Xu Bingyin, Xu Xianming, Guo Yuejin (female), Huang Ming, Huang Tao, Cao Wushun, Cao Yaofeng, Chang Jinyue (Hui nationality), Chang Dechuan, Kang Fengying (female), Dong Fenghua (female), Dong Cuina (female), Jiang Minhua, Jiang Minglin, Han Yuqun, Fu Yanhua, Wen Fujiang, Chu Deliu, Bao Zhiqiang, Cai Qiufang (female), Guan Huashi, Tan Xuguang, Zhai Xigui, Fan Chunxia (female), Huo Junping (female).	180	
2008	11th	Ding Yuhua, Yu Xiaoyu (female, Hui), Ma Pingchang, Ma Xianfu, Ma Chunji, Wang Yuancheng, Wang Wensheng, Wang Kemin, Wang Lixin, Wang Gang, Wang Tingjiang, Wang Shoudong, Wang Zhizhong, Wang Zhimin, Wang Li (female, Hui), Wang Qishan, Wang Qicheng, Wang Jinfu, Wang Faliang, Wang Xiuzhi, Wang Guibo, Wang Peiting, Wang Yinxiang (female), Wang Suilian (female), Wang Xinhong, Niu Baowei, Niu Huilan (female), Fang Caichen, Yin Zhongqing, Yin Chuangui, Yin Huimin (female), Kong Beihua, Kong Qing, Deng Xiangyang, Deng Baojin (female), Cong Qiangzi, Feng Yisheng, Da Jianwen, Lü Mingchen, Hua Jianmin, Zhuang Wenzhong, Liu Yifa, Liu Feng (female, Mongolian), Liu Xingliang, Liu Xuejing, Liu Jianwen (female, Hui), Liu Chunhong (female), Liu Rongxi (Hui) Liu Xiqian, Liu Xinguo (Mongolian), Liu Jiakun, Jiang Wei, Jiang Linchang, Jiang Baoan, Tang Jianmei (female, Hui), Xu Liquan, Xu Zhenchao, Xu Zhihui (female), Xu Ruiju (female), Sun Wensheng, Sun Pishu, Sun Wei (female), Sun Liqiang, Sun Jing (female), Ji Yujun, Mai Kangsen, Su Shoutang, Du Bo, Li Xiaopeng, Li Tianjun, Li Changshun, Li Dongsheng, Li Mingmin, Li Qingsi, Li Guoan, Li Jianhua, Li Jianguo, Li Hongfeng, Li Xueqin (female), Li Huidong (Hui), Li Xiangping, Li Denghai, Li Zhaoxing, Yang Ziqiang, Yang Weicheng, Yang Jun, Yang Mianmian (female), Wu Qian (female), Wu Cuiyun (female), Wu Dexing, Qiu Yafu, Shen Zhiqiang, Shen Chunyao, Song Wenxin (female), Song Xinfang, Song Zuowen, Song Changlin,Song Yiqiao, Zhang Caiqiu, Zhang Shaojun, Zhang Qingwei, Zhang Jiangting, Zhang Zhifa, Zhang Zhiyong, Zhang Ruofei, Zhang Zhongzheng, Zhang Xuexin, Zhang Jianhua, Zhang Jianguo, Zhang Zhenchuan, Zhang Guiyu, Zhang Shuqin (female), Chen Yulan (female), Chen Gong, Chen Wei, Chen Huasen, Chen Guiyun (female, Buyi ethnic group), Shao Fengjing (female), Wu Guanghua, Wu Yuqiang, Lin Fenghai, Yu Zhangyu, Shang Ruifen (female), Guo Jiasen, Jin Lanying (female, Hui ethnic group), Jin Zhiguo, Zhou Yuhua, Zhou Houjian, Zhou Sumin (female), Zhou Xiaofeng, Zhou Qingli, Zhou Yaoqi, Zong Chengle, Wan Qiusheng (Hui ethnic group), Zhao Zhiquan, Zhao Buchang, Zhao Chunlan (female), Zhao Shengxuan, Zhao Run Tian, Zhao Jiajun, Hao Jianzhi (female), Hao Cuijuan (female), Rong Lanxiang, Xiang Jianhai, Zhan Shuyi, Yu Shuwei, Jiang Daming, Jiang Weidong, Jiang Jian (female), Gong Xuebin, Fei Yunliang, Yuan Jinghua (female), Geng Jiahuai, Mo Zhaolan (female, Zhuang ethnicity), Li Jia, Xia Chunting, Xia Geng, Xu Bingyin, Xu Huadong, Xu Xianming, Xu Qing (female), Gao Mingqin (female), Gao Xinting, Guo Jincai, Huang Ming, Gong Yaoqin (female), Chang Zhenyong, Chang Dechuan, Kang Fengying (female), Dong Fenghua (female), Dong Cuina (female), Jiang Minhua, Han Yuqun, Jing Xinhai, Cheng Lin, Fu Yanhua, Wen Fujiang, Tan Xuguang, Mu Fanmin, Dai Sujun, Dai Ruide	181	
2013	12th	Ding Yuhua, Bu Changsen, Yu Guoan, Yu Jinming, Cai Limin (Manchu), Wan Lianbu, Ma Chuanxian (female, Hui), Ma Zehua, Ma Xiaokun, Wang Shiling, Wang Yunpeng, Wang Wenhua, Wang Shuping, Wang Youde, Wang Gang, Wang Tingjiang, Wang Shoudong, ~~Wang Zhizhong~~, Wang Liang, Wang Jinshu, Wang Faliang, Wang Qinfeng, Wang Xin, Wang Yong, Wang Guibo, Wang Xiao, Wang Aiguo, Wang Ling (female), Wang Yinxiang (female), Wang Suilian (female), Wang Hui, Wang Ruixia (female, Hui), Wang Wei, Niu Baowei, Qiu Bingyu, Fang Caichen, Shen Changyou, Bai Quanmin, Cong Qiangzi, Da Jianwen, Bi Hongsheng, Lü Mingchen, Zhuang Wenzhong, Liu Yifa, Liu Feng (female, Mongolian), Liu Jun, Liu Guotian, Liu Xuejing, Liu Zongli, Liu Rongxi (Hui) Liu Xiaojing (female), Liu Xinguo (Mongolian), Liu Jiakun, Liu Shuguang, Jiang Linchang, Jiang Baoan, Xu Zhenchao, Sun Pishu, Sun Wei (female), Sun Wei, Sun Mingbo, Sun Jianbo, Sun Aijun, Sun Jiye, Sun Jing (female), Sun Huanquan, Mai Kangsen, Du Chuanzhi, Du Zhenxin, Li Changqing, Li Tongdao, Li Anxi, Li Keqiang, Li Wei, Li Jianhua, Li Jianguo, Li Shaoxia (female), Li Xiangling (female), Li Xiaoxia (female), Li Xueqin (female), Li Huidong (Hui), Li Xiangping, Li Denghai, Li Lu, Yang Ziqiang, Yang Weicheng, Yang ~~Yixin~~, Yang Luyu, Wu Pengfei, Qiu Yafu, Zou Bing, Sha Yuanju (female, Hui), Shen Zhiqiang, Shen Chunyao, Song Wenxin (female), Song Xinfang, Song Zuowen, Zhang ~~Shiping~~,Zhang Caiqiu, Zhang Shuping, Zhang Wufeng, Zhang Yongming, Zhang Guangfeng, Zhang Zhiyong, Zhang Wuzong, Zhang Mingqi, Zhang Xuexin, Zhang Jianhua, Zhang Sixia, Zhang Yanli (female), Zhang Guiyu, Zhang Shuqin (female), Zhang Hui (female), Zhang Xinqi, Lu Haixia (female), Chen Xianyun, Chen Xueping (female), Chen Xiqing, Chen Ying (female), Shao Zhongyi, Shao Fengjing (female), Lin Fenghai, Zhuo Changli (female), Shang Ruifen (female), Jin Lanying (female, Hui nationality), Zhou Yunjie, Zhou Houjian, Zhou Hongjiang, Zhou Hui (female), Zong Chengle, Wan Qiusheng (Hui nationality), Zhao Dongling (female), Zhao ~~Zhiquan~~, Zhao Buchang, ~~Zhao~~ Shengxuan, Zhao Suhua (female) Zhao Aihua (female), Zhao Lianguan, Zhao Yixin (female), Hao Cuijuan (female), ~~Rong Lanxiang~~, Hu Guihua (female), Bai Jimin, Jiang Daming, Jiang Weidong, Jiang Yikang, Jiang Jian (female), Gong Mingjie, Yao Jiannian, Yuan Zhongxue, Yuan Jinghua (female), Xu Changyu, Xu Jinpeng, Xu Chengqiu, Xu Xianming, Xu Qing (female), Xu Jingyan, Ling Peixue, Gao Mingqin (female), Guo Jincai, Guo Ailing (female), Tang Yilin, Huang Xiuling (female), Mei Yonghong, Cao Jinping (female), Dong Yajuan (female), Jing Xinhai, Cheng Lin, Jiao Wenyu (female), Wen Fujiang, Lei Jianguo, Tan Xuguang, Zhai Luning (female), Mu Fanmin, Dai Ruide	175	
2018	13th	Ding Yuhua, Yu Anling (female), Yu Jinming, Yu Xiaoming, Yu Haitan, Wan Lianbu, Ma Huabin (Hui), Ma Chuanxian (female, Hui), Ma Chuankai (Hui), Ma Bo (Hui), Wang Yijun, Wang Shiling, Wang Wentao, Wang Yuzhi, Wang Gang, Wang Hongxing, Wang Zhonglin, Wang Jinshu, Wang Xuebin, Wang Weidong, Wang Qinfeng, Wang Qiuling (female), Wang Xiulin, Wang Yong, Wang Guibo, Wang Xiaojie (female), Wang Xiaofei (female), Wang Ling (female), Wang Juan (female), Wang Xuemei (female), Wang Yinxiang (female), Wang Suilian (female), Wang Yan (female), Wang Ruixia (female, Hui), Wang Xinjie, Wang Xinchun, Wang Wei, Che Shi, Niu Baowei, Qiu Bingyu, Wen Dong (Hui), Kong Fanqun, Kong Yi (female), Lu Lin, Shi Weiyun, Yi Aiwen (female), Yin Ping (Female, Manchu), Si Liuqi, Bi Hongsheng, Zhuang Wenzhong, Liu Wenling (female), Liu Qingmin, Liu Xingyun, Liu Yingcai (female), Liu Xuemin (female), Liu Xuejing, Liu Xiuwen, Liu Lili (female), Liu Xiaojing (female), Liu Jiayi, Qi Yuxiang, Qi Jiabin, Jiang Bixin, Chi Jianmei (female), Xu Chuanjiang, Xu Zhenchao, Xu Fuhua (female), Sun Pishu, Sun Wei (female), Sun Jianbo, Sun Jiye, Su Chengyun, Du Zhenxin, Li Jiucun, Li Changqing, Li Yaxin (female), Li Xixin, Li Xiyong, Li Wei, Li Xuehai, Li Shupeng, Li Shumu (Hui), Li Feng, Li Kuanduan, Li Xueqin (female), Li Xiangping, Li Denghai, Li Qun, Li Yan (female), Wu Lixin, Wu Juan (female), Qiu Yafu, Yu Xiaozhong, Zou Ning, Wang Hongyan (female), Shen Zhiqiang, Song Wenxin(Female), Song Junji, Song Yuanfang, Zhang Guangying (Hui), Zhang Weiguo, Zhang Shuping, Zhang Jiatian, Zhang Yongming, Zhang Yongxia (female), Zhang Zhiyong, Zhang Wuzong, Zhang Jinhai, Zhang Xuezheng, Zhang Jianwei, Zhang Jianhua, Zhang Xiansheng, Zhang Guiyu, Zhang Haijun, Zhang Haibo, Zhang Tong, Zhang Mengxue (female), Zhang Shuqin (female), Zhang Hui (female), Zhang Xinwen, Zhang Yi, Chen Fei, Chen Yong, Chen Enming, Chen Xueping (female), Chen Fukuan, Zhuo Changli (female), Shang Ruifen (female), Jin Jing (female, Hui), Zhou Yunjie, Zhou Jianjun, Zhou Houjian, Zhou Hongjiang, Zheng Yueming, Zheng Shuna (female) Meng Fanli, Zhao Dongling (female), Zhao Feng, Zhao Haozhi, Hao Fang, Hu Guihua (female), Hou Jun, Jiang Weidong, Gong Mingjie, Yao ~~Jiannian~~, Qin Yufeng, Yuan Junzhou, Geng Zunzhu, Mo Zhaolan (female, Zhuang), Xia Zhaoji, Xu Guoquan, Xu Jingeng, Yin Luqian, Gao Mingqin (female), Guo Jincai, Guo Ailing (female), Guo Rui, Mei Jianhua, Cao Jinping (female), Gong Zheng, Cui Guihai, Cui Honggang, Han Liping, Han Rongzhao, Han Feng, Cheng Lin, Fu Mingxian, Xie Weijun, Man Shenggang, Dou Yanli (female, Hui), Cai Ling (female), Tan Xianguo, Tan Xuguang, Fan Liming (female), Wei Dedong .	175	
2023	14th	Yu Yongsheng, Yu Anling, Yu Jinming, Yu Haitan, Ma Huabin, Wang Yijun, Wang Chuan, Wang Yuzhi, Wang Yongsheng, Wang Gang, Wang Yuyan, Wang Zhiwei, Wang Liang, Wang Nian, Wang Xuebin, Wang Weidong, Wang Qinfeng, Wang Xiulin, Wang Liang, Wang Xiaofei, Wang Qian, Wang Yinxiang, Wang Suilian, Wang Yan, Wang Luming, Wang Ruixia, Wang He, Niu Baowei, Yin Hua, Kong Fanping, Kong Yi, Shi Aizuo, Lu Lin, Tian Junxia, Shi Weiyun, Yin Ping, Feng Tao, Si Xiangfang, Lü Tianbao, Lü Zhongmei, Zhu Kaiguo, Zhu Yongguan, Zhu Lihua, Zhuang Wenzhong, Liu Zibin, Liu Wenling, Liu Yun, Liu Jianjun, Liu Lili, Liu Xiaojing, Qi Yuxiang Qi Hu, Guan Zhijie, An Jiajie, Xu Chuanjiang, Xu Anbiao, Sun Dongwei, Sun Xiaoying, Sun Aijun, Du Yuzhen, Du Zhenxin, Li Changqing, Li Wenlong, Li Lanxiang, Li Yongsheng, Li Yaxin, Li Zaiwu, Li Wei, Li Lin, Li Zebing, Li Xuehai, Li Chuntian, Li Feng, Li Hui, Li Xiangping, Li Denghai, Li Yan, Yang Dongqi, Yang Qifeng, Yang Chaoming, Shu Wei, Xiao Fuquan, Xiao Shurong, Wu Lixin, He Xin, Zou Ning, Song Xiquan, Song Xiuyan, Chi Shaolin, Zhang Yuzhong, Zhang Qiaoliang, Zhang Yongming, Zhang Baishun, Zhang Gang, Zhang Hongqi, Zhang Xiuli, Zhang Dianzhuang, Zhang Hongwei, Zhang Guohu, Zhang Jinhai, Zhang BoZhang Baoliang, Zhang Haijun, Zhang Haibo, Zhang Shuqin, Lu Zhiyuan, Chen Bichang, Chen Enming, Chen Xueping, Shao Lili, Lin Wu, Zhuo Changli, Shang Ruifen, Luo Qi, Jin Shulong, Zhou Naixiang, Zhou Yunjie, Zhou Ying, Zheng Yueming, Zheng Jianbang, Zheng Simin, Zheng Wanhua, Zheng Deyan, Wan Bin, Guan Changfeng, Zhao Dongling, Zhao Qingwen, Zhao Guoqun, Zhao Baolin, Zhao Xuchun, Zhao Zhuoping, Zhao Haozhi, Hao Fang, Hu Shue, Hou Yugang, Jiang Weidong Jiang Bin, Yuan Junzhou, Geng Zunzhu, Jia Shaoqian, Xia Hongmin, Gu Xuefei, Xu Fengqiu, Xu Jun, Xu Hui, Xu Jingeng, Luan Jun, Gao Youdong, Huang Ming, Cao Jinping, Cao Jingfang, Cui Lixin, Liang Xunmei, Peng Jixian, Dong Danhua, Han Zheng, Han Jinfeng, Han Feng, Cheng Lin, Cheng Ping, Zeng Zanrong, Wen Guangyong, Wen Jinrong, Zhen Aihua, Lei Jie, Dou Yanli, Liao Zengtai, Zhai Yanping, Fan Qingbin, Fan Dongwei, Huo Min, Dai Caili, Wei Dedong	173	
