= Beijing delegation to the National People's Congress =

Beijing Delegation to the National People's Congress
- 全国人民代表大会北京市代表团
- Delegation for the National People's Congress
- Map showing the location of Shanghai Municipality
- Electoral unit: Beijing Municipality
- Population: 21,893,095

Current Delegation
- Created: 1954
- Seats: 53
- Head of delegation: Li Xiuling
- Municipal People's Congress: Beijing Municipal People's Congress

The Beijing delegation to the National People's Congress is a delegation composed of deputies representing Beijing Municipality in within the National People's Congress (NPC), the highest organ of state power of the People's Republic of China. NPC deputies from Beijing Municipality are officially elected by the Beijing Municipal People's Congress.

== List of deputies ==
| Year | NPC sessions | Deputies | Number of deputies | Ref. |
|---|---|---|---|---|
| 1954 | 1st | Mao Zedong, Wu Han, Li Yong, Li Shusen, Zhou Enlai, Lin Qiaozhi, Fan Jin, Yin Weichen, Pu Jiexiu, Ma Yuhuai, Zhang Youyu, Zhang Xiruo, Zhang Xiaomei, Liang Sicheng, Mei Lanfang, Guo Shude, Peng Zhen, Shu Sheyu, Hua Luogeng, Huang Runping, Zai Tao, Liu Shaoqi, Liu Shimei, Liu Yingyuan, Liu Dezhen, Le Songsheng, Jiang Nanxiang, Zhu Futang | 28 | |
| 1959 | 2nd | Wan Li, Wang Kunlun, Mao Zedong, Le Songsheng, An Chaojun, Liu Shaoqi, Liu Dezhen, Song Ting (female), Li Shu, Wu Han, Lin Qiaozhi (female), Zhang Youyu, Zhang Baifa, Zhang Xiaomei (female), Zhang Xiruo, Luo Shuzhen (female), Zhou Enlai, Fan Jin (female), Pu Jiexiu (female), Yin Weichen, Liang Sicheng, Guo Shude, Mei Lanfang, Peng Zhen, Huang Runping, Shu Sheyu, Zai Tao, Jiang Nanxiang, Zhu Futang | 29 | |
| 1964 | 3rd | Wan Li, Wang Yi, Wang Yonggui, Wang Kunlun, Wang Kai, Wang Kaimou, Mao Zedong, Deng Xiaoping, Deng Tuo, Tian Wenkuan, Le Songsheng, An Qi, An Chaojun, Liu Yunsheng, Liu Shaoqi, Liu Baiyu, Liu Zongyue, Liu Guojuan, Liu Dezhen, Zhuang Zedong, Zhu Zhaoxue, Zhu Baohe, Zhu Hongyin, Zhu Jue, Zhu Lin, Ren Xinmin, Hua Luogeng, Song Ting, Yan Renying, Du Renyi, Du Ruo, Li Wenfu, Li Kezuo, Li Shu, Li Yuming, Li Molin, Li Deshou, Yang Shihui, Yang Jiasan, Shi Chuanxiang, Wu Zuoren, Wu Han, Wu Jingting, Zhang Zi'e, Zhang Youyu, Zhang Baifa, Zhang Guangdou, Zhang Huaizu, Zhang Tilun, Zhang Xiaomei, Zhang Xi Ruo, Zhang Yun, Lu Ping, Chen Fa, Chen Suzhi, Fan Bolin, Fan Jin, Lin Qiaozhi, Lin Chuanguang, Yi Zongpu, Luo Shuzhen, Zhou Yulan, Zhou Faqi, Zhou Enlai, Meng Jimao, Zhao Yanxia, Hou Youlin, Yao Shuping, He Lin, Pu Jiexiu, Guo Shude, Guo Yingqiu, Zhu Futang, Qin Huaisen, Zai Tao, Jia Tingsan, Xu Renxiang, Xu Qingwen, Xu Guangxian, Yin Weichen, Tao Shufan, Liang Sicheng, Zhang Xuzhao, Cui Guangcheng, Xie Ying, Peng Zhizhong, Peng Zhen, Huang Kun, Huang Runping, Jiang Nanxiang, Dong Weiyu, Han Ruilan, Shu Sheyu, Qiu Weifan, Yu Jiaxi, Tan Fuying, Cai Xu, Cai Ganhan, Pan Wenshu, Pan Benquan, Wei Jiangong | 101 | |
| 1975 | 4th | Ding Xuesong, Yu Huiyong, Yu Sang, Wan Li, Ma Changli, Ma Chengjie, Ma Jun, Ma Jian, Ma Zhenyong, Wang Yi, Wang Shisuo, Wang Shimin, Wang Sheng, Wang Guanlan, Wang Laizhen, Wang Xiuying, Wang Yeqiu, Wang Zhongze, Wang Peizhu, Wang Jingge, Wang Weiyu, Wang Jianming, Wang Xuanhai, Wang Shu, Wang Hairong, Wang Weijian, Wang Dehui, Wang Daoyi, Wang Zhen, Wang Wei, Niu Shushen, Renqing Zhaxi, Ulanhu, Fang Yi, Deng Xiaoping, Deng Yingchao, Gu Yuan, Lu Zongying, Ye Fei, Ye Kun, Tian Zhang, Bai Shouyi, Bai Shuxin, Cong Xuecheng, Feng Youlan, Feng Qin, Bian Jiang, Cheng Yin, Lü Yuzhen, Zhu Zongyi, Zhu Zhenming, Qiao Guan Hua, Wu Jingyuan, Ren Yunzhong, Ren Chengshui, Ren Hengtai, Zhuang Zedong, Liu Dazheng, Liu Youfa, Liu Changyu, Liu Fengxiu, Liu Xianzhou, Liu Qingtang, Liu Yu, Liu Yunsheng, Liu Xiumei, Liu Shikun, Liu Xiang, Guan Ruiwu, Tang Yijie, Xu Fuchang, Sun Hongzhi, Mou Sen, Du Xiuxian, Li Liyin, Li Jingquan, Li Shaochun, Li Changying, Li Wenhua, Li Shuangxi, Li Qiaoyun, Li Maoyuan, Li Yingjie, Li Jinquan, Li Yan, Li Chengxiang, Li Rongchun, Li Junlin, Li Lahe, Li Jingde, Li Fuchun, Li Qiang, Li Cuilan, Li Delun, Yang Yang, Yang Shoushan, Yang Xiuying, Yang Hongdian, Yang Muzhi, Yang Chunmao, Yang ChunxiaYang Fumin, Wu Yuanfu, Wu Yinxian, Wu Zhonghua, Wu Zuoren, Wu Chunshan, Wu Huanxing, Wu Jihua, Wu De, Wu Defeng, He Shengxiang, He Houwen, Yu Qiuli, Xin Xiaolian, Wang Yang, Shen Hong, Song Qingzhong, Song Jinlan, Chi Qun, Zhang Zhongyu, Zhang Fengwen, Zhang Fengling, Zhang Wenbi, Zhang Shizhong, Zhang Yongmei, Zhang Fake, Zhang Jinqi, Zhang Yunlin, Zhang Jun, Zhang Jie, Zhang Yinhua, Zhang Yinxi, Zhang Yongshou, Zhang Xitian, Zhang Bo, Zhang Yun, Chen Dingmao, Chen Zibin, Chen Yun, Chen Yuniang, Chen Shixiang, Chen Yongxiang, Chen Guodong, Chen Fujin, Chen Dehe, Wu Xinyu, Fan Daren, Lin Qiaozhi, Lin Zhaomu, Lin Jia Mei, Lin Huiqing, Zhuo Lin, Luo Yuchuan, Luo Peilin, Zhou Tian, Zhou Mingchen, Zhou Jianren, Zhou Haiying, Zhou Peiyuan, Zheng Yintang, Meng Jimao, Zhao Junzhen, Zhao Bingnan, Zhao Hongyan, Zhao Shuzhen, Zhao Yanxia, Liu Zhongyang, Zhong Min, Hou Baolin, Hong Xuefei, Yuan Shihai, Yuan Chen, Mo Ai, Xia Zhenhuan, Gu Pinzhen, Qian Weichang, Ni Zhifu, Xu Jinqiang, Xu Fu, Yin Chengzhong, Yin Chengzhen, Gao Yuqian, Guo Wei, Guo Moruo, Guo Yingfu, Guo Lu, Tang Zhongwen, Pu Jiexiu, Hao Liang, Hao Ran, Zhu Futang, Ji Pengfei, Huang Changshui, Cao Xianqin, Cao Yu, Cao Yiou, Cao Lu, Sheng Lihua, Kang Keqing, Han WenzhiHan Quanhu, Han Guangming, Han Baorui, Cheng Chunshu, Cheng Shaopei, Fu Wenqi, Fu Yufang, Tong Dizhou, Xie Fang, Xie Jingyi, Lai Jifa, Xie Lifu, Cai Chang, Liao Chengzhi, Tan Yuanshou, Tan Zhenlin, Xue Jinghua, Bo Taihe, Ji Hanchao, Wei Jiangong | 222 | |
| 1978 | 5th | Ding Shengshu, Ma Jian, Wang Dajun, Wang Yi, Wang Lanqin, Wang Qian, Wang Chengkui, Wang Laizhen, Wang Zuozhou, Wang Yanchang, Wang Yeqiu, Wang Ruoshui, Wang Kunlun, Wang Zhongcheng, Wang Weiyu, Wang Junsheng, Wang Shuxian, Wang Shuling, Wang Shouguan, Wang Huide, Wang Ruifeng, Wang Dechang, Che Wenhuan, Niu Guide, Mao Wenshu, Mao Weizhong, Mao Lianjue, Deng Zhiyi, Shi Gou, Shi Meiyin, Ye Duzheng, Tian Zhongshan, Shi Hongzhi, Bai Jiefu, Bai Shouyi, Bai Jiliang, Bai Shuxin, Cong Xuecheng, Feng Zhi, Lü Lanxin, Lü Baowei, Zhu Jue, Qiao Shiqiong, Wu Jingyuan, Ren Zichao, Ren Chengshui, Ren Chengxun, Ren Hengtai, Hua Guofeng, Hua Luogeng Xiang Jinjiang, Wu Jixiu, Liu Changwen, Liu Fengqin, Liu Da, Liu Zongzhuo, Liu Shikun, Liu Shaowen, Liu Xiangzhi, Liu Hesheng, Liu Suying, Liu Zhenqi, Liu Runfang, Liu Jingchun, Liu Feng, Liu Daoyu, Liu Duzhou, Liu Fucun, Liu Deyuan, Liu Yi, Liu Yaomin, Guan Shanfu, Jiang Muyue, Xu Mingyue, Xu Shuhua, Xu Weiying, Xu Qinmei, Ji Dengkui, Yan Renying, Lu Guojun, Du Caiyuan, Du Peihua, Li Yifu, Li Ziping, Li Fengfu, Li Fenglou, Li Qiaoyun, Li Helin, Li Mingzhi, Li Zhong, Li Yan, Li Jianping, Li Chengwei, Li Mengfu, Li Qin, Li Lahe, Li Ruihuan, Li Siyao, Li Xin, Yang ShihuiYang Xiaoting, Yang Shirong, Yang Caifa, Yang Xiuying, Yang Mo, Yang Chunmao, Yang Weimin, Yang Jingrong, Yang Jiachi, Yang Delin, Xiao Youming, Xiao Lun, Xiao Chi, Wu Zhonghua, Wu Huanxing, Wu De, He Dongchang, Xin Yuling, Wang Dongxing, Wang Runsheng, Shen Bingzhen, Shen Cheng, Song Yiping, Song Yuying, Song Qingzhong, Zhang Dazhong, Zhang Pinghua, Zhang Zhongchen, Zhang Guoji, Zhang Binggui, Zhang Xianglin, Zhang Shuli, Zhang Lin, Zhang Xitian, Zhang Yun, Ayitula, Chen Dingmao, Chen Shixiang, Chen Yongxiang, Chen Lunfen, Chen Baosen, Chen Jianbang, Chen Changhao, Chen Fuhan, Chen Chi, Mao Yujiang, Mao Yisheng, Lin Qiaozhi, Lin Lanying, Lin Jiamei, Luo Yuchuan, Zhou Changsheng, Zhou Faqi, Zhou Lin, Zhou Jianren, Zhou Peiyuan, Zheng Tianxiang, Meng Jimao, Zhao Wenxi, Zhao Yongzhu, Zhao Bingnan, Zhao Ximing, Zhao Pengfei, Zhao Yanxia, Rong Ke, Hu Hanquan, Liu Dagang, Liu Dechun, Duan Baocheng, Hou Baolin, Shi Dengyuan, Hong Sisi, Qin Lisheng, Geng Changwai, Xia Nai, Gu Gutong, Qian Zhongtai, Ni Zhifu, Xu Qingwen, Xi Runzhen, Gao Qingshi, Gao Yimin, Guo Yingfu, Guo Fujin, Guo Yingqiu, Tang Youzhi, Pu Jiexiu, Zhu Futang, Ji Pengfei, Huang Bingwei, Huang Yong, Huang Hongning, Mei Zengsen, Cao Youzhong, Cao Yiou, Cao Yu, Cao Lu, Geng Xiuhe, Ge Tingshan, Dong XinjuHan Zuoli, Cheng Chunshu, Fu Wenqi, Fu Zhengang, Jiao Sufeng, Tong Dizhou, Bao Wenkui, Lian Shuangjin, Mu Qingguang, Cai Ruohong, Cai Junling, Tan Baoxian, Pan Zhibin, Bo Taihe, Mu Chengli, Wei Dingwang, Qu Jufang | 217 | |
| 1983 | 6th | Wang Hanbin, Wang Zhonglie, Wang Kaimou, Wang Qun, Wang Bilin, Ye Caimin, Ye Lin, Ye Peiying, Shi Dingchao, Shi Jingxian, Bai Jiefu, Bai Shouyi, Zhu Jue, Zhu Weilin, Zhu Dexi, Liu Ren, Liu Da, Liu Duzhou, Liu Dezhen, An Taixiang, Sun Jianxun, Yan Renying, Lu Zengyu, Li Huiyuan, Li Yuming, Yang Shihui, Yang Mo, Yang Chunmao, Song Shixiong, Zhang Wanyu, Zhang Youyu, Zhang Xiuzhen, Zhang Xiuqin, Zhang Guoji, Zhang Guoxia, Zhang Binggui, Zhang Tengxiao, Chen Dingmao, Chen Lunfen, Chen Xitong, Chen Boren, Lin Lanying, Lin Yu, Ji Xianlin, Zhou Guanwu, Zhao Bingnan, Zhao Ziyang, Zhao Pengfei, Zhao Yanxia, Hu Yaobang, Duan Junyi, Duan Baocheng, Hou Baolin, Geng Yuling, Ni Zhifu, Xu Qingwen, Guo Yingfu, Pu Jiexiu, Zhu Futang, Huang Ziyun, Huang Yingfu, Peng Zhen, Dong Jianhua, Dong Xinju, Han Maofu, Fu Chunming, Xie Zinong, Qiu Weifan, Lei Jieqiong, Bao Wenkui | 70 | |
| 1988 | 7th | Yu Weiguo, Yu Shizhi, Wan Li, Ma Yaoji, Wang Bilin, Ye Caimin, Ye Lin, Shi Dingchao, Shi Jingxian, Zhu Dexi, Liu Jianqing, Liu Duzhou, Liu Deyu Yan Renying, Du Deshun, Li Huiyuan, Li Weikang, Li Bosheng, Li Peng, Yang Mo, Yu Yongning, Song Shixiong, Zhang Wenqi, Zhang Shiying, Zhang Zhanlin, Zhang Guoji, Zhang Jibin, Lu Weide, Chen Dingmao, Chen Lunfen, Chen Xitong, Chen Xiaoda, Ying Ruocheng, Luo Libo, Luo Yifeng, Zhou Guanwu, Zhao Shouyan, Zhao Chuida, Zhao Ziyang, Zhao Pengfei, Hu Dapeng, Hu Yamei, Ke Changtang, Hou Baolin, Jia Tingrang, Qian Xiuzhen, Guo Benli, Pu Jiexiu, Tao Dayong, Tao Xiping, Huang Ziyun, Mei Zuyan, Cao Fengguo, Fu Lan, Yan Chengzong, Dong Jianhua, Dong Xinju, Han Maofu, Cheng Chunbo, Fu Kecheng, Xiong Ming, Dai Yi, Wei Tingdi, Wei Fuyuan | 64 | |
| 1993 | 8th | Yu Shizhi, Wan Siquan, Ma Yaoji, Wang Run, Wang Bilin, Zhang Zhenliang, Fang Huijian, Ye Caimin, Shi Jingxian, Dai Shulan, Rong Yi, Guo Huifen, Liu Changyu, Liu Minfu, Jiang Xiaoke, Yan Renying, Du Deshun, Li Qiyan, Li Bosheng, Li Ximing, Li Peng, Yang Yiyun, Yang Zhounan, Yang Mo, Wu Shuqing, Yu Yongning, Song Shixiong, Zhang Zhanlin, Zhang Gongqing, Zhang Jianmin, Chen Dingmao, Chen Lunfen, Chen Xitong, Shao Yunjie, Ying Ruocheng, Guo Lin, Luo Yifeng, Zhou Guanwu, Zheng Guangmei, Meng Zhende, Zhao Shouyan, Zhao Pengfei, Hu Dapeng, Hu Yamei, Jia Cuiying, Qian Xiuzhen, Qian Qing, Ni Guangnan, Ling Aiyi, Guo Benli, Pu Jiexiu, Tao Dayong, Tao Xiping, Huang Ziyun, Huang Da, Huang Chao, Mei Zuyan, Yan Chengzong, Dong Jianhua, Fu Tieshan, Xie Jun, Li Guang | 62 | |
| 1998 | 9th | Wang Wenjing, Wang Zhongcheng, Wang Lingfei, Wang Zhaoyue, Wang Xuan, Wang Run, Wang Weicheng, Mao Daru, Zhang Zhenliang (Hui), Dai Shulan, Guo Huifen, Bi Qun, Ren Ming, Zhuang Yi, Liu Changyu, Liu Hongjun, Liu Ying, Liu Qi, Jiang Xiaoke, Sun Weigang, Li Wenhai, Li Jinhai, Li Qiangou, Li Mingtao, Li Peng, Li Fucheng, Yang Zhounan, Wu Shuqing, He Luli, Yu Yongning, Wang Tong, Wang Jia, Song Shixiong, Zhang Zhanlin, Zhang Liangji, Zhang Gongqing, Zhang Jianmin (Manchu), Zhang Fusen, Lu Shanzhen, Chen Lunfen, Ying Ruocheng (Manchu), Lin Mingmei, Shang Xiuyun, Luo Yifeng, Jin Renqing, Meng Zhiyuan, Hu Yamei, Duan Bingren, Hong Fuzeng, Jia Qinglin, Gu Angran, Gu Meiling, Qian Qing, Xu Bingzhong, Ling Aiyi, Gao Lipu, Tao Xiping, Fu Tieshan, Cai Yaoxian, Huo Da (Hui) | 60 | |
| 2003 | 10th | Yu Junbo, Ma Wenpu, Wang Xiaomo, Wang Wenjing, Wang Yongyan, Wang Zhongcheng, Wang Weicheng, Mao Daru, Mao Guifen (female), Fang Gong (Hui nationality), Fang Xin (female), Long Xinmin, Tian Xiong, Zhu Jimin, Qiao Xiaoyang, Liu Changyu (female), Liu Zhengmin, Liu Bing (female), Liu Qi, Yan Aoshuang (female), Jiang Yonghua (female), Xu Zhihong, Ji Baocheng, Du Guosheng, Li Zhuqi, Li Qiangou, Li Mingtao, Li Fucheng, Yang De'an, Qiu Sulun (female), He Luli (female) Shen Baochang, Zhang Fengchao, Zhang Zhongning, Zhang Gongqing, Zhang Yanli (female), Lu Shanzhen, Chen Wenzhan, Fan Yuanmou, Lin Wenyi (female), Lin Mingmei (female), Luo Yifeng, Meng Xuenong, Zhao Fengtong, Liu Chuanzhi, Duan Bingren, Qin Zhengan, Jia Qinglin, Gao Lipu (female), Tang Dasheng (Manchu), Tang Xiaoqing (female), Ge Xiaoyin (female), Han Ping (female), Cheng Hong (female), Fu Tieshan, Qiang Wei, Cai Yaoxian (female), Qi Xiaojin (female), Zhai Ruoyu | 59 | |
| 2008 | 11th | Yu Junbo, Ma Wenpu, Ma Zonglin, Wang Xiaoke (female, Hui nationality), Wang Tianyou, Wang Yunfeng, Wang Wenjing, Wang Weizheng, Wang Wei, Wang Anshun, Wang Rongrong (female), Mao Guifen (female), Fang Xin (female), Tian Xiong, Feng Leping (female), Feng Kun (female), Ji Lin, Zhu Jimin, Liu Changyu (female), Liu Zhongjun, Liu Qi, Liu Xincheng, Yan Aoshuang (female), Guan Kuoshan, Chi Qiang, Xu Zhihong, Sun Anmin, Mou Xinsheng, Ji Baocheng, Du De Yin, Li Zhijian, Li Zhaoling (female), Li Fucheng, Yang De'an, Xiao Jianguo, Wu Bixia (female), Qiu Sulun (female), Song Yushui (female), Song Guilun, Zhang Gong, Lin Yifu, Ouyang Zehua, Luo Jinbao, Tuya (female, Mongolian), Jin Shengguan, Zhao Jiuhe, Zhao Fengshan, Liu Chuanzhi, Suo Liansheng (Manchu), Jia Qinglin, Gao Lipu (female), Guo Jinlong, Huang Yanming, Mei Ninghua, Xie Weihe, Mu Ping, Qi Xiaojin (female), Wei Gang | 58 | |
| 2013 | 12th | Ma Xu (Manchu), Ma Zhenchuan, Wang Wanbin, Wang Xiaoke (female, Hui), Wang Wenjing, Wang Ercheng, Wang Quan, Wang Anshun, Wang Qishan, Wang Qinghai, Wang Xiaochu, Wang Zheng, Wang Rongrong (female), Fang Xin (female), Deng Zhonghan, Feng Leping (female), Zhu Liangyu, Zhu Huigang, Liu Zhongjun, Liu Xiaochen, Liu Xincheng, Yan Aoshuang (female), Chi Qiang, Su Hui (female), Du Deyin, Li Shixiang, Li Dajin, Li Zhaoling (female), Li Chaogang, Yang Xiaochao, Wu Zhengxian (female, Mongolian), Wu Shixiong (Manchu), Wu Bixia (female), Huai Jinpeng, Zhang Dayong, Zhang Heping, Chen Jining, Chen Yulu, Ouyang Zehua, Ouyang Song, Zhou Qifeng, Zhao Yu, Zhao Kai, Rong Hua (female), Duan Qiang, Qian Yuan (female), Xu Heyi (Hui), ~~Gao Xiaohong~~, Gao Lipu (female), Guo Jinlong, Liang Wei, Han Xiaowu, Cheng Jing, Mu Ping, Wei Zhe | 55 | |
| 2018 | 13th | Ma Yide, Wang Quan, Wang Zheng, Fang Fuquan, Li Li, Tian Chunyan, Feng Leping, Ren Ming, Yi Tong, Liu Jiajun, Liu Wei, Qi Mei, Yan Aoshuang, Du Deyin, Li Wei, Li Junfeng, Li Yong, Li Xiaolin, Yang Wanming, Yang Yuanqing, Wu Sufang, Wu Chen, Qiu Yong, He Fusheng, Zhang Gong, Zhang Libin, Zhang Jiandong, Chen Liren, Chen Jining, Chen Gang, Chen Yong, Lin Jianhua, Luo Ying, Zhou Liyun, Pang Lijuan, Zhao Yu, Zhao Chunlei, Zhao Xiaoyan, Hou Zhanying, Qin Fei, Ban Yuxia, Xia Weidong, Xia Linmao, Gu Jin, Xu Tao, Gao Zicheng, Tang Hailong, Tan Xuxiang, Yan Jianguo, Kou Fang, Jing Dali, Han Yongjin, Cheng Jing, Jin Wei, Lei Jun, Cai Qi, Pan Jingdong, Dai Tianfang | 55 | |
| 2023 | 14th | Ma Yide, Ma Xu, Wang Shaofeng, Wang Zheng, Wang Hong, Wang Zugang, Wang Chunfa, Qi Yanjun, Wenxian, Fang Fuquan, Yin Li, Xing Weibing, Zhu Yapin, Yi Tong, Liu Wei, Liu Mingqun, Qi Jing, Yan Aoshuang, Ruan Xiangyan, Sun Zezhou, Li Chenggui, Li Xiuling, Li Shushen, Wu Huaxia, Wu Chen, He Shaohua, Zhang Jiandong, Zhang Haiou, Chen Jian, Wu Zeng, Lin Shangli, Yue Qiaoyun, Pang Lijuan, Zheng Shanjie, Zhao Minge, Hao Ping, Yao Ming, He Hong, Jia Wenqin, Xia Linmao, Gu Weiying, Yin Yong, Gao Zicheng, Guo Lei, Yan Jianguo, Kou Fang, Ge Haijiao, Dong Jin, Cheng Jing, Lei Jun, Dou Xiaoyu, Guan Wenhui, Mu Peng | 54 | |
