= Inner Mongolia delegation to the National People's Congress =

Inner Mongolia Autonomous Region Delegation to the National People's Congress
- 全国人民代表大会内蒙古自治区代表团
- Delegation for the National People's Congress
- Map showing the location of the Inner Mongolia Autonomous Region
- Electoral unit: Inner Mongolia Autonomous Region
- Population: 24,049,155

Current Delegation
- Created: 1954
- Seats: 58
- Head of delegation: Sun Shaocheng
- Regional People's Congress: Inner Mongolia Autonomous Regional People's Congress

The Inner Mongolia Autonomous Region delegation to the National People's Congress is a delegation composed of deputies representing Inner Mongolia Autonomous Region within the National People's Congress (NPC), the highest organ of state power of the People's Republic of China. NPC deputies from Inner Mongolia are officially elected by the Inner Mongolia Autonomous Region People's Congress.

== List of deputies ==
Year	NPC session	Deputies	Number of deputies	Ref.
1954	1st	Wang Zaitian, Wang Dianxing, Wang Duo, Zhou Beifeng, Kui Bi, Hu Heletai, Wulan, Ulanhu, Temurbaatar, Fu Zuoyi, Liu Xiumei, Galazang, Su Qianyi: By-election on June 15, 1956: Buhe	13	
1959	2nd	Wang Zaitian, Liu Xiumei (female), Dali Zhaya, Su Qianyi, Li Jidong, Jiergeler, Zhang Jiafu, Zhou Beifeng, Zhao Bin, Hu Heletai, Kuibi, Temurbagen, Ulan (female), Ulanhu, Galazang, Tan Zhenxiong	16	
1964	3rd	Yi Dexinhao Rilao, Fang Yanjun, Wang Zaitian, Wang Yilun, Yun Shufen, Yun Shubi, Wuri Zhe, Ulanhu, Ulanbagan, Tian Wansheng, Jiang Fuli, Liu Kuiyou, Qi Yue, Guan Bu, Dalizhaya, Su Qianyi, Li Feng, Li Chao, Li Xizu, Zhang Lifan, Zhang Jiafu, Chen Yafen, Baoyintu, Baoyindeliger, Zheng Piliu, Wangqing Surong, Jin Shilin, Zhou Beifeng, Zhou Rongxin, Hong Chaosheng, Zhao Jiapu, Zhao Bin, Kui Bi, Zan Liang, Gaobuzebo, Gao Xibu, Guo Yiqing, Guo Laohu, Guo Cuilan, Temurbagen, Xu Zhimin, Tongfu, Sayier, Peng Wenhe, Siqintarha, Ge Dehong, Chaokesongzhabu, Xie Xuegong, Tan Zhenxiong, Erhenbatu, Erdunchaolu, Erdenzhabu, Galazang, Wei Zhaorong	55	
1975	4th	Ding Jihong, Wang Jinyu, Wang Duo, Wang Zengqi, You Taizhong, Wuyunqiqige, Batu, Batubagen, Bayindaoerji, Deng Cunlun, Yu Rong, Shi Cuirong, Zhu Minghui, Sexingga, Liu Sanwa, Liu Litang, Liu Guangzi, Naqin Shuanghe'er, Nasunbayar, Sun Lanfeng, Wu Tao, Mulan, Song Haifa, Zhou Beifeng, Baolizhao, Baoriledai, Meng Zhaoqin, Hong Baoyu, Qin Furong, Ni Ziwen, Gao Shuhua, Chang Si, Qinggertai, Fu Kuanxiao, Tong Qizhe, Pan Xiuying, Wei Jinsheng	37	
1978	5th	Wang Sunli, Wang Duo, You Taizhong, Niu Bao, Ulanhu, Batu, Batu Bagen, Yu Rong, Long Mei, Liu Guangzi, Liu Jingping, Namula, Naqin Shuanghe'er, Sun Fengren, Sun Lanfeng, Li Gui, Li Dexun, Wu Quanxi, Mulan, Shamuteng, Zhang Rongzhen, Zhang Kuiren, Zhang Hongkui, Chen Xizhen, Wu Tiansheng, Zhou Beifeng, Bao Riledai, Baoyin, Zhao Yurong, Hu Zugen, Chaganqiqige, Kuibi, Zan Guicheng, Narengerile, Qin Wenbin, Qin Furong, Jia Youling, En Yali, Guo Zhanwei, Guo Genbao, Eqierhuyaktu, Yin Fengying, Qinggeertai, Tong Qizhe, Cai Fenyu	45	
1983	6th	Caijierhu, Ma Ming, Wang Guolong, Wang Yu, Wang Duo, Wang Weizhen, Yun Shubi, Ulanhu, Wuni, Batu Bagen, Zhanbulazhabu, Tian Wenxing, Nima, Bian Yunfeng, Ren Ping, Hua Zhu, Xu Renhua, Liu Shujing, Liu Fuhou, Ande (Oroqen), Narengerile, Su Geng, Du Runsheng, Li Shuyuan, Li Gui, Li Tielin, Li Yuying, Li Cuiling, Yang Bingqi, Shen Xinfa, Zhang Jishu, Zhang Yingqi, Zhang Guo Wei, Alatai, Chen Wenxiao, Chen Liangbi, Wu Heng, Hurilebaterhuhe, Jin Sui, Zhou Beifeng, Zhou Rongchang, Baorizhulajiga, Zhao Lixin, He Wenhua, Geriletu, Xu Xiangli, Xu Shujun, Tang Hongming, Tang Zhang'ai, Tang Sixiao, Hai Yuchen, Tao Ketao, Cui Guoliang, Qinggertai, Jiang Xingguo, Han Liying, Han Jingyan, Han Fusheng, Lei Nairang, Bao Jinhua, Xiong Tiesheng, Erdunchulu, Pan Shujun	64	
1988	7th	Wang Shuanghu, Wang Zhenyu, Wang Weizhen, Mao Aohai, Ulanhu, Batu Bagen, Buhe, Zhanbulazhabu, Lu Zhenyuan, Ye Junshan, Ye Xisangbu, Bai Luyong, Sejilahu, Liu Yong'an, Liu Zheng, Liu Yanru, Sun Yingnian, Su Muya, Su He, Surongzhabu, Li Wenguang, Li Xixian, Li Gui, Yang Yulan, Yang Nasheng, Yang Bingqi, Zhang Tingwu, Zhang Fusheng, Alatai, Chen Bingfu, Chen Xiucai, Chen Weihuan Chen Jinghe, Lin Gan, Hudute, Hugjiltu, Luojiamusu, Luo Zhendong, Luo Xien, Zhou Beifeng, Zhao Xiuying, Hao Xiushan, Hulawusu, He Jian, Hexigezabu, Xu Xiangli, Gao Fenglian, Gao Shouyao, Tang Yilong, Tang Zhangyuan, Tang Sixiao, Huang Zhigang, Huang Shaoying, Cao Aiqing, Cui Shunji, Qinggertai, Chen Zhihong, Siligeng, Han Yugen, Daobu, Daoerjipalamu, Que Qiuhao, Deliger	63	
1993	8th	Yu Xinglong, Yu Lihua, Ma Lin, Wang Fengqi, Wang Yushan, Wang Weizhen, Wang Zhanwen, Wang Xianjin, Wang Linzhen, Wang Shangluo, Wang Weishan, Wang Jingfen, Wang Qun, Wuliji, Wuliji, Wuni, Wen Lidong, Burenbaiyila, Buhe, Lu Zhenyuan, Bao Wenfa, Feng Li, Lü Cheng, Xu Renhua, Liu Xuemin, Liu Zhenyi, Li Changfa, Li Wenguang, Li Zhiying, Li Baoan, Wu Xuyang, He Fulin, Tong Ying Zheng, Di Wangwang, Shen Guanghong, Zhang Weihua, Zhang Yunsheng, Zhang Feng, Zhang Yuhua, Zhang Guomin, Zhang Fusheng, Chen Shoupeng, Chen Xiucai, Chen Pengshan, Zhou Jue, Zhao Zhicheng, Rong Wenbin, Chaganbater, Gong Shuqing, Fei Songlin, He Xigezabu, Xu Shuming, Gao Lianyuan, Tang Zhangyuan, Tao Zuoyi, Sangjie Maolun, Cui Shunji, Sredar, Daobu, Xie Hongzu, Saige, Deliger, Erdenkou	63	
1998	9th	Yu Xinglong (Mongolian), Yu Tiefu (Mongolian), Ma Lin, Ma Dehai, Wang Xianshi, Wang Xianjin, Wang Shaozhen, Wang Weishan (Mongolian), Yun Erzhu (Mongolian), Yun Wenguang (Mongolian), Yun Dekui (Mongolian), Niu Yuru (Mongolian), Wuyunqimuge (Mongolian), Kong Linghong, Buhe (Mongolian), Ping Ziliang, Lu Dexun, Tian Ying (Manchu), Bao Jinshan (Mongolian), Feng Shiliang, Feng Li, Qu Wen (Oroqen), Lü Qiu'e, Ren Yingchao, Liu Mingzu, Dugu (Ewenki), Li Rongxi, Li Zhen Dong, Yang Huanyou, Wu Chongcai, Song Zhimin, Zhang Gongping, Zhang Lihua, Zhang Xiwu, Chen Shoupeng, Chen Pengshan, Qi Yingcheng (Mongolian), Mulan (Mongolian), Zhou Lixin, Zhou Qiang, Meng Zhiyi (Daur), Zhao Hui, Hao Wenxiu, Hu Yulin, Hudagula (Mongolian), Chagan (Mongolian), Gao Yanru, Zhu Guangkai, Mo Jiancheng, Jia Cai, Temurbater (Mongolian), Gao Guizhen, Sierjigawa (Mongolian), Han Zhirang (Mongolian), Chaoke (Ewenki), Xie Hongzu, Lei Erdeni (Mongolian)	57	
2003	10th	Wan Jisheng, Ma Jun, Wang Fengqi (Mongolian), Wang Linxiang, Yun Dalai (Mongolian), Yun Jianguo (Mongolian), Yun Feng (Mongolian), You Ren (Mongolian), Wuyunqimuge (female, Mongolian), Urtu (Mongolian), Wu Ruosi (Mongolian), Kong Linghong, Bu Xiaolin (female, Mongolian), Feng Li, Lü Qiu'e (female), Ting Batel (Mongolian), Qiao Shouwei (female), Liu Yunshan, Liu Zhuozhi, Liu Mingzu, Liu Hong, Sun Zhagen, Subudao (female, Mongolian), Dugu (Ewenki), Li Binghe, Li Rongxi, Li Sumei (female, Manchu), Wu Jin Liang, Qiu Rongqing, Zhang Zhenwu, Alihui (female, Oroqen), Chen Shoupeng, Lin Donglu, Qi Yingcheng (Mongolian), Huercha (Mongolian), Yue Fuhong, Xie Guoyan, Zheng Mingli, Zhao Shiliang (Mongolian), Zhao Zhong, Zhao Suqin (female), Zhao Guizhen (female), Zhao Hui (female), Hao Xukuan, Hu Yifeng (Mongolian), Liu Xiu, Hou Cuirong (female), Yan Dong (Daur), Mo Jiancheng, Xu Ruixia (female), Chang Hai (Mongolian), Fu Taizeng, Liang Tiecheng (Mongolian), Dong Hengyu, Han Zhirang (Mongolian), Chao Ke (Ewenki), Jiao Kaihe, Chu Bo	58	
2008	11th	Ding Ruilian (female), Wang Zhonghe, Wang Fengchao, Wang Yuming, Wang Xiuzhi (female, Mongolian), Wang Linxiang, Wang Suyi (Mongolian), Wang Rungang, Yun Xiumei (female, Mongolian), Yun Zhihou (Mongolian), Wuyunqimuge (female, Mongolian), Urtu (Mongolian), Ulanbatel (Mongolian), Bai Xiangqun (Mongolian), Lü Qiu'e (female), Ren Yaping, Seyintu (Ewenki), Liu Santang, Liu Fengshu (female, Manchu), Tang Aijun, Du Zi, Li Wanzhong, Li Fengbin, Li Wenge (Mongolian), Li Qiqige (female, Mongolian), Li Binghe, Li Rongxi, Yang Feiyun, Yang Jing (Mongolian), Xiao Lisheng, Wu Jinliang, Zhang Fengxia (female), Lin Fenqiang, Huercha (Mongolian), Luo Zhihu (Mongolian), Meng Yuzhen (female, Oroqen), Zhao Yongqi, Hao Yidong, Rong Tianhou (Mongolian), Hasibagen (Mongolian), Hou Qingmin, Lou Bojun, Jia Jianhui (female), Gu Shuangyan (female), Xu Ruixia (female), Guo Lihong (female), Guo Honglin (Daur), Guo Jian (Mongolian), Tao Jian, Cui Chen, Liang Tiecheng (Mongolian), Tu Hailing, Chao Ke (Evenki), Chaolumeng (Mongolian), Fu Tiegang, Chu Bo, Lei Erdeni (Mongolian), Miao Wenmin	58	
2013	12th	Ma Yongsheng, Ma Ruiqiang, Wang Fengchao, Wang Jun, Wang Linxiang, Wang Baojia, Yunfeng (Mongolian), Urtu (Mongolian), Batel (Mongolian), Deng Yuelou (Mongolian), Shi Lei, Bai Xiaoguang, Dong Yun (female, Mongolian), Bao Manda (Mongolian), Feng Yuzhen, Si Yanhua (female), Xing Yun, Xing Yongming, Zhu Ruilian (female), Yi Yongchun (female, Mongolian), Seyintu (Ewenki), Liu Yunshan, Liu Junchen, Du Jizhou, Li Yifei, Li Chunlong, Li Rongxi, Yang Feiyun, He Sheng Bao (Oroqen), Wang Erqi (female, Manchu), Zhang Liping, Zhang Guoxing, Zhang Xueqin, Hu Ercha (Mongolian), Luo Haitang (female, Mongolian), Hu Dagula (female, Mongolian), Hu Ruifeng (female, Mongolian), Hu Yifeng (Mongolian), Chagadai (female, Mongolian), Duan Zhiqiang (Mongolian), ~~Hou Fengqi~~, Jiang Lan (female, Mongolian), Fei Dongbin, Qin Yi, Suo Shuhui (Daur), Guo Lihong (female), Guo Qijun, Guo Bingsheng, ~~Tao Shuju (female, Mongolian)~~, Chang Junzheng, Liang Tiecheng (Mongolian), Chao Ke (Ewenki), Fu Yongchun, Fu Ying (female, Mongolian), Lian Su, ~~Pan Yiyang~~, Erdengerile (female, Mongolian), Xue Zhiguo	58	
2018	13th	Yu Lixin (Mongolian), Ma Chunyu, Wang Bo, Wang Xinhui (female), Wang Junxiang (Mongolian), Wang Xiaohong (female), Ge Ming (Mongolian), Bu Xiaolin (female, Mongolian), Shi Yudong, Dai Xiyuan (Oroqen), Feng Yuzhen, Feng Yanli (female), Xing Jiehong (female), Liu Yasheng (female), Liu Huicheng, Liu Lifen (female), Liu Qifan, Na Shunmenghe (Mongolian), Li Yuliang, Li Quanwen, Li Jiheng, Li Guoqin (female), Li Rongxi, Li Qilin, Li Cuizhi (female), Yang Zongren (Mongolian), Wu Ying (female), Wu Yunbo (Mongolian), Zhang Lei, Zhang Jianmin, Zhang Xiaobing, Zhang Jixin, Zhang Jiyi, Chen Liang (Mongolian), Qibatu (Mongolian), Huhebatuer (Mongolian), Zhou Yizhe, Meng He (Mongolian), Meng Xiandong, Zhao Huijie (female, Manchu), Zhao Jiangtao (Mongolian), ~~Hao Maorong (Mongolian)~~, Fei Dongbin, Narentuya (female, Mongolian), Suo Shuhui (Daur), Jia Runan,~~Gao Shihong~~Guo Yanling (female), Mei Hua (female, Evenki), Gong Mingzhu (Mongolian), Chaolemeng (Mongolian), Xue Zhiguo, Huo Zhaoliang (Mongolian)	58	
2023	14th	Yu Lixin, Ji Yongqian, Wang Zhaoming, Wang Wangsheng, Wang Caiyun, Wang Zhen, Bu Xiaolin, Shi Yudong, Xing Jiehong, Gong Xuefeng, Zhuang He, Liu Yanbing, Liu Shuang, Yan Hongguang, Yan Hongwei, Sun Shaocheng, Sun Ying, Su He, Du Huiliang, Du Gang, Li Zhongzeng, Li Wenling, Li Yongjun, Li Bin, Yang Jin, Yang Zongren, Yang Zhenwu, Wu Ying, Wu Haijun, He Lifeng, He Mailasu, Zhang Jixin, Zhang Rui, Zhang Shaochun, Chen Aixue, Lin Shaochun, Qi Feiyun, Qi Yuqin, Luo Qing, Jin Zhijun, Zheng Hongfan, Meng Daying, Meng Fanying, Zhao Huijie, Hu Haijuan, He Haidong, Ao Huiran, Xu Jianxing, Guo Dayong, Guo Yufeng, Tang Chao, Gong Mingzhu, Lu Hongbo, Erdundalai, Xue Zhilong, Ju Shuwen	58	
