= Hainan delegation to the National People's Congress =

Hainan Delegation to the National People's Congress
- 全国人民代表大会海南省代表团
- Delegation for the National People's Congress
- Map showing the location of Hainan Province
- Electoral unit: Hainan Province
- Population: 10,081,232

Current Delegation
- Created: 1988
- Seats: 26
- Head of delegation: Shen Xiaoming
- Provincial People's Congress: Hainan Provincial People's Congress
- Created from: Guangdong delegation

The Hainan delegation to the National People's Congress is a delegation composed of deputies representing Hainan Province in within the National People's Congress (NPC), the supreme organ of state power of the People's Republic of China. NPC deputies from Hainan Province are officially elected by the Hainan Provincial People's Congress.

== List of deputies ==
Year	NPC session	Deputies	Number of delegates	Ref.
1993	8th	Wang Guangxing, Wang Faren, Wang Guilan, Wang Qiongying, Wang Yuefeng, Ruan Chongwu, Du Qinglin, Du Bilan, Li Guangliang, Yang Wengui, Wu Kuiguang, Chen Jiayue, Huang Baozhang, Fu Bingxin, Zeng Haorong, Lei Jieqiong, Pan Qiongxiong	17	
1998	9th	Ding Shisun, Wang Guangxian, Wang Faren, Wang Xueping (Li ethnic group), Wang Xintian, Wang Guilan (Li ethnic group), Wang Tan, Ruan Chongwu, Du Qinglin, Du Bilan, Wu Kuiguang, Wang Xiaofeng, Chen Sunwen, Chen Zhirong (Li ethnic group), Chen Guihua (Li ethnic group), Lin Yuquan, Zhou Song, Huang Wensheng (Li ethnic group)	18	
2003	10th	Ding Shisun, Wang Guangxing, Wang Qishan, Wang Xueping (Li ethnic group), Wang Houhong, Liu Hairong (female), Liu Qi, Xu Xingxiong (Li ethnic group), Ruan Chongwu, Li Yongxi (female, Li ethnic group), Wang Xiaofeng, Zhang Xiao (female), Chen Gaowei (Miao ethnic group), Lin Yuquan, Zhou Song, He Hengde, Gao Zhiguo, Huang Chunmei (female, Li ethnic group), Fu Xiurong (female, Li ethnic group).	19	
2008	11th	Wei Liucheng, Wang Yixin, Wang Shouchu (female), Wang Jiquan (Li ethnic group), Wang Xiong (Li ethnic group), Deng Zeyong (Miao ethnic group), Ji Mingjiang (Li ethnic group), Lü Wei (female), Li Jianbao, Wu Changyuan, Yu Yonghua, Zhang Mingyi, Chen Guocheng (Li ethnic group), Luo Baoming, Hao Ruyu, Jiang Sixian, Gao Zhiguo, Fu Guihua (female, Li ethnic group), Dai Bingguo (Tujia ethnic group)	19	
2013	12th	Wei Liucheng, Wang Yong, Wang Xiong (Li ethnic group), Deng Zeyong (Miao ethnic group), Ji Mingjiang, Lü Wei (female), Li Guoliang, Li Jianbao, Yang Jiechi, Xiao Jie, Yu Yonghua, Zhang Lei, Lin Huifu, Lin Meijuan (female, Li ethnic group), Luo Baoming, Zhou Gongzu, Hao Ruyu, Zhong Chunyan (female), Ni Qiang, Gao Zhiguo, Huang Yuefang (female, Li ethnic group), Fu Xing, Fu Yuelan (female, Li ethnic group), Jiang Dingzhi, Dai Jinyi	25	
2018	13th	Wang Changren, Wang Shumao, Mao Chaofeng, ~~Deng Xiaogang~~, Deng Zeyong (Miao), Lü Caixia (female), Lü Wei (female), Zhu Hongwu (Li), Liu Ping, Liu Cigui, Xu Jun, Yang Ying (female), Xiao Jie, Wu Yue (female, Li), Shen Xiaoming, Zhang Yesui, A Dong (Hui), Chen Piao (Li), Fu Caixiang (female, Li), Luo Baoming, Fu Xiaoqin (female, Li), Fu Xuanchao, Han Jinguang, Lan Fo'an, Liao Hongyu	25	
2023	14th	Ding Hui, Wang Xiaoyun, Wang Hong, Wei Xiaoli, Feng Fei, Lü Yan, Liu Xiaoming, Su Shaohong, Li Jun, Li Feng, Wu Shaoyu, Chen Fan, Chen Guomeng, Wu Weihua, Fu Caixiang, Lin Huan, Lin Hao, Zhou Junping, Zhong Shan, Huang Haiwen, Cao Xiankun, Ge Guoke, Jing Zhu, Lei Yafei, Cai Qiang	26	
