= Tibet delegation to the National People's Congress =

Tibet Autonomous Region Delegation to the National People's Congress
- 全国人民代表大会西藏自治区代表团
- Delegation for the National People's Congress
- Map showing the location of the Tibet Autonomous Region
- Electoral unit: Tibet Autonomous Region
- Population: 3,648,100

Current Delegation
- Created: 1954
- Seats: 24
- Head of delegation: Wang Junzheng
- Regional People's Congress: Tibet Autonomous Region People's Congress

The Tibet Autonomous Region delegation to the National People's Congress is a delegation composed of deputies representing Tibet Autonomous Region in within the National People's Congress (NPC), the highest organ of state power of the People's Republic of China. NPC deputies from Tibet are officially elected by the Tibet Autonomous Region People's Congress.

== List of deputies ==
Year	NPC session	Deputies	Number of deputies	Ref.
1954	1st	Chijiang Losang Yeshe, Xierao Dengzhu, Ngapoi Ngawang Jigme, Fanming, Jigme, Losang Tsering Lhundrup Chokyi Gyaltsen, Zhang Guohua, Yaoxi Tsering Drolma, Tenzin Gyatso	9	
1959	2nd	Wang Qimei, Xierao Dengzhu, Yaoxi Zeren Zhuoma (female), Dalai Lama Tenzin Gyatso, Chijiang Losang Yeshe, Bangda Dorje, Zhang Guohua, Ngapoi Ngawang Jigme, Zhou Renshan, Panchen Erdeni Chokyi Gyaltsen, Gesang Wangdui, Zhandong Jigme	12	
1964	3rd	Tsering, Dawa, Wang Qimei, Danba Gyaltsen, Shengchen Losang Gyaltsen, Bangda Dorje, Sherab Dondrup, Dorje Tseten, Gonpo, Zhang Guohua, Ngapo Tseten Drolma, Ngapo Ngawang Jigme, Lhamin Sonam Lhundrup, Pagbalha Geleg Namgyal, Zhou Renshan, Losang Tsering, Imperial Envoy, Langjie, Gesang Wangdui, Tsok Kho Dondrup Tsering, Denpa Jampal, Tsomu, Qunpei, Deji	24	
1975	4th	Rinchen Wangyal, Basang, Zhandui, Shengchen Losang Gyaltsen, Ningzhu, Qujia, Renrong, Cidan, Gongbu, Suzhongjie, Li Faqin, Yang Dongsheng, Ngapoi Tseten Drolma, Ngapoi Ngawang Jigme, Lindong, Pabala Geleg Namgyal, Zheng Shuqin, Gesang Wangdui, Gesang Yeshe, Sonam Wangdui, Gao Shengxuan, Tsomu, Puntsok Tsering, Tsoqi, Karma	25	
1978	5th	Tseten Dolma, Tianbao, Tashi Lhamo, Danba Gyaltsen, Basang, Bude, Zhandui, Shengchen Losang Gyaltsen, Jicun, Daji, Renrong, Rendelu, Tsering, Tsering Lhamo, Anzeng, Yang Weikai, Ngapoi Tseten Dolma, Ngapoi Ngawang Jigme, Qingwang, Lhamo, Pabala Geleg Namgyal, Zheng Ying, Sonam Chokyong, Sangding Dorje Phagmo, Sangzhu, Tsomu, Purbu Tsering, Dege Gesang Wangdui, Pando	29	
1983	6th	Tseten Dolma, Rinchen Wangyal, Jicun, Jipu Puntsok Tsering, Dawa Gyaltsen, Daji, Dorje Tseten, Tsering, Jiangzhong Tashi Dorje, Yin Fatang, Ngapoi Tseten Dolma, Ngapoi Ngawang Jigme, Lin Daoxun, Panchen Erdeni Chokyi Gyaltsen, Sangding Dorje Phagmo, Sangzhu, Tsomu, Puzhi, Jampa Chilie	19	
1988	7th	Yu Xuelin, Tuden Tsering, Tashi Lhamo, Puntsok, Dawa Pendo, Wu Jinghua, Dorje Tsering, Jiangzhong Tashi Dorje, Jianzheng, Ngapoi Tseten Drolma, Ngapoi Ngawang Jigme, Laba Tsering, Langjie, Loga, Panchen Erdeni Chokyi Gyaltsen, Sonam, Sonam Tenzin, Jampa Chilie, Jampa Dorje Odrup	19	
1993	8th	Tsewang Panchen, Puntsok, Shengchen Losang Gyaltsen, Baizhen, Xiangba Puntsok, Jiangcun Luobu, Jianzheng, Ngapoi Tseten Dolma, Chen Kuiyuan, Pagbalha Geleg Namgyal, Hu Jintao, Losang, Losang Danda, Losang Jiangcun, Losang Tenzin, Losang Namgyal, Radi, Sonam Tenzin, Tan Huasheng	19	
1998	9th	Tsewang Banden (Tibetan), Wang Jianping, Yongzhong Gawa (Tibetan), Dabeng (Lhoba), Lieque (Tibetan), Dorje Tsering (Tibetan), Dorje Tsering (Tibetan), Tsering (Tibetan), Jiangcun Luobu (Tibetan), Li Guohua (female), Ngapoi Tseten Drolma (Tibetan), Pagbalha Geleg Namgyal (Tibetan), Danzeng Tsering (Monpa), Losang (Tibetan), Losang Jiangcun (Tibetan), Raidi (Tibetan), Yeshe Yangzom (Tibetan), Kangjin (Tibetan), Liang Dianchen	20	
2003	10th	Niu Zhizhong, Mao Rubai, Yula (female, Tibetan), Baidan Cuomu (female, Monpa), Yongzhong Gawa (Tibetan), Lieque (Tibetan), Dorje (Tibetan), Duotuo (Tibetan), Zhang Youcai, Luobu Dunzhu (Tibetan), Hu Jintao, Losang Tsering (Tibetan), Losang (Tibetan), Raidi (Tibetan), Xiaohong (female, Lhoba), Guo Jinlong, Yixi Yangzong (female, Tibetan), Weise (Tibetan), Dong Mingjun, Deji (female, Tibetan)	20	
2008	11th	Ding Zhongli, Wang Huning, Kang Jinzhong, Baidan Cuomu (female, Monpa), Dawa Zhaxi (Tibetan), Lieque (Tibetan), Xiangba Pingcuo (Tibetan), Dorje Tsering (Tibetan), Sezhu (female, Tibetan), Zhang Qingli, Awang (Tibetan), Zhao He, Gesang Zhuoga (female, Tibetan), Xiaohong (female, Lhoba), Sazhen (female, Tibetan), Cui Leiping, Weise (Tibetan), Pubu (Tibetan), Xinza Danzeng Quzha (Tibetan), Gama Renqing (Tibetan)	20	
2013	12th	Ding Zhongli, Wang Huning, Yundan (Tibetan), Zhaxi Yangjin (female, Lhoba), Pingcuo (Tibetan), Baima Quzhen (female, Monpa), Baima Chilin (Tibetan), Jiayong Nyima (Tibetan), Xiangba Pingcuo (Tibetan), Ciwang Renzeng (Tibetan), Hongwei (Tibetan), Wu Yingjie, Chen Quanguo, Wangdui (Tibetan), Losang Danba (Tibetan), Losang Jiangcun (Tibetan), Gesang Zhuoga (female, Tibetan), ~~Guo Yili~~, Yixi Zhuoga (female, Tibetan), ~~Chang Xiaobing~~	20	
2018	13th	Zhao Kezhi, Guo Qingping, Jing Hanchao, Wang Yongjun, Zhaxi Jiangcun (Lhoba), Baima Chilin (Tibetan), Liu Guorong, Qizhala (Tibetan), Ciren Cuodan (female, Tibetan), Mima Guoji (Tibetan), Wu Yingjie, Zhuoga (female, Tibetan), ~~Wangdui~~(Tibetan), Guoguo (Tibetan), Zeren Yongzong (female, Tibetan), Losang Jiangcun (Tibetan), Gesang Zhuoga (female, Tibetan), Gesang Deji (female, Monpa), ~~Pengcuo~~ (Tibetan), Purbu Tundrup (Tibetan)	20	
2023	14th	Wang Hongxiang, Zhang Guoqing, Lin Rui, Wang Qiang, Wang Weidong, Wang Fanghong, Wang Yongxiang, Wang Junzheng, Zhaxi Nima, Zhaxi Jiangcun, Bata, Baima Cuo, Nima, Nizhen, Ciren Cuomu, Yan Jinhai, Laqiong, Laqiong, Qide, Luobu Yangzong, Luo Qingwu, Losang Jiangcun, Gesang Zhuoma, Sonam Tenzin, Garma Zeden	24	
