= Tianjin delegation to the National People's Congress =

Tianjin Delegation to the National People's Congress
- 全国人民代表大会天津市代表团
- Delegation for the National People's Congress
- Map showing the location of Tianjin Municipality
- Electoral unit: Tianjin Municipality
- Population: 13,866,009

Current Delegation
- Created: 1954
- Seats: 39
- Head of delegation: Yu Yunlin
- Municipal People's Congress: Tianjin Municipal People's Congress

The Tianjin delegation to the National People's Congress is a delegation composed of deputies representing Tianjin Municipality within the National People's Congress (NPC), the highest organ of state power of the People's Republic of China. NPC deputies from Tianjin Municipality are officially elected by the Tianjin Municipal People's Congress.

== List of deputies ==
Year	NPC sessions	Deputies	Number of deputies	Ref.
1954	1st	Wang Guangying, Zhu Xianyi, Zhu Jisheng, Wu Lengxi, Wu De, Li Chunqing, Li Jiebo, Li Zhuchen, Zhou Shutao, Yu Aifeng, Ma Sicong, Zhang Guofan, Bi Mingqi, Guo Xiuyun, Tao Menghe, Fu Hongbin, Huang Huoqing, Yang Shixian, Yang Chengwu, Ge Lianfang, Liu Changfu, Liu Geping, Liu Yinfu, Qian Jiaguang, Bo Yibo, Luo Yun, Tan Zhiqing, Tan Zhen	28	
1959	2nd	Part of Hebei Province		
1964	3rd	Part of Hebei Province		
1975	4th	Yu Liqun, Ma Wenrui, Ma Shuling, Wang Fengchun, Wang Fengru, Wang Youshui, Wang Jiang, Wang Zuoshan, Wang Xuewen, Wang Baozeng, Wang Chengshu, Wang Xin, Wang Guirong, Wang Mantian, Wang Shuqing, Wang Ganchang, Qu Tangliang, Bei Shizhang, Mao Henian, Yin Zanxun, Kong Yuan, Deng Chumin, Zha Xiwangxu, Tian Zenggui, Bai Guiqing, Feng Jiancheng, Lü Zhengcao, Zhu Xianyi, Wu Xiuquan, Wu Chan, Hua Fengxiang, Hua Yuxiang, Kang Tiejun, Zhuang Mingli, Liu Wenyu, Liu Wenhui, Liu Yuzhong, Liu Mengwen, Liu Fei, Jiang Hua, An Guangyun, Xu Deheng, Sun Jinhua, Sun Degang, Li Liqun, Li Yamin, Li Yanchang, Li Helin, Li Fanyi, Li Jinsheng Li Ronggui, Li Runjie, Li Deqing, Yang Shixian, Yang Dongchun, Yang Xiufeng, Yang Liuqiao, Wu Youxun, He Jifeng, Min Enze, Shen Eryan, Song Wenge, Zhang Huasi, Zhang Wenzhi, Zhang Maijun, Zhang Kexia, Zhang Jie, Zhang Guoxiang, Zhang Guoji, Zhang Guofan, Zhang Guizhen, Lu Da, Chen Cisheng, Chen Bingjian, Chen Li, Chen Weiji, Chen Jingrun, Wu Yuping, Lin Qiyu, Jin Shanbao, Zhou Shutao, Zhou Enlai, Lang Yuanchen, Meng Qingsheng, Meng Qingyu, Meng Xianhua, Zhao Yun, Hu Ziang, Hu Qiaomu, Zha Yiping, Duan Ruling, Hou Jun, Yu Aifeng, Yao Zhiying, Jia Zhanjin, Gu Kangle, Gu Binyuan, Qian Sanqiang, Xu Qingfu, Xu YanmingXu Guiying, Yin Baohua, Gao Shiqi, Gao Jingui, Guo Dali, Huang Jiasi, Cao Benxi, Cao Xiangren, Gong Xueliang, Yan Dakai, Yan Fuzhen, Han Guang, Han Xiuhua, Cheng Zihua, Jiao Youxuan, Zeng Zhi, Pu Fuzhou, Chu Tunan, Lei Yongfang, Lu Xijie, Xie Xuegong, Cai Shumei, Liao Canhui, Duan Zhi, Miao Tianrui, Xue Qingquan, Bo Wenhuai, Dai Nianci	128	
1978	5th	Yu Liqun, Yu Guilan, Yu Guizhen, Yu Shuzhen, Ma Lianli, Wang Maosheng, Wang Fengru, Wang Bingqian, Wang Youshui, Wang Xuemin, Wang Chengshu, Wang Enhui, Qu Tangliang, Bei Shizhang, Niu Yingguan, Mao Henian, Shi Jinglin, Ye Daqing, Ye Zhiqiang, Tian Xiuying, Feng Delu, Xing Guojun, Rong Xuezhen, Zhu Xianyi, Ren Yuzhen, Kang Tiejun, Zhuang Xiquan, Zhuang Mingli, Liu Wenyu, Liu Zhiyong, Liu Yunsheng, Liu Jinhua, Liu Jianzhang, Liu Junxiu, Liu Jiaying, Liu Fei, Qi Zisheng, Jiang Hua, An Yutong, Xu Deheng, Sun Jingwen, Su Zhuang, Li Kaixin, Li Yunfeng, Li Yutang, Li Yuqin, Li Runjie, Li Menghua, Li Jingxia, Li Leixiao Li Dianwu, Yang Tianshou, Yang Shixian, Yang Jianbai, Yang Xiufeng, Yang Xuwen, Yang Houlan, Wu Jinsheng, Wu Yuanpu, He Songjiang, He Binglin, Gu Yunting, Min Enze, Shen Eryan, Song Jidong, Zhang Shizhen, Zhang Wenzhi, Zhang Ligui, Zhang Shoucai, Zhang Chuyang, Zhang Jinquan, Zhang Guizhen, Chen Yuniang, Chen Zuogui, Chen Jinrong, Chen Guimu, Chen Jingrun, Wu Yuping, Fan Quan, Luo Shuzhang, Yue Changhua, Zhou Shutao, Pang Shulan, Zheng Tianting, Zhao Shijie, Zhao Jinsheng, Zhao Zhichun, Zhao Jun, Hao Deqing, Hu Qiaomu, Hu Zuokuan, Hu Zeng, Zhong Ziyun, Yu Aifeng, Hong Bonian, Gu Kangle, Qian Sanqiang, Xu Maofen, Yin Zhihua, Yin BaohuaGao Shiqi, Gao Yutang, Guo Zhirong, Guo Xilu, Huang Shiji, Huang Zhigang, Cao Benxi, Cui Qingwu, Liang Xueyi, Peng Yixiang, Jiang Nanxiang, Han Quanhua, Chu Guangming, Lu Da, Lu Xijie, Xie Xuegong, Liao Canhui, Miao Tianrui, Mu Qing, Dai Nianci, Wei Shuzhen	121	
1983	6th	Yu Xiangyun, Yu Shuzhen, Shi Peiyan, Ye Huiran, Tian Ningshou, Rong Xuezhen, Nian Jinglin, Liu Huo, Liu Xingzong, Liu Yunsheng, Liu Ruixiang, Xu Deheng, Sun Zhiqiang, Sun Qinxian, Li Zhizhen, Li Dongsheng, Li Ning, Li Zhongyan, Li Baorong, Li Qizu, Li Ruihuan, Li Xinjian, Yang Tianshou, Yang Jianbai, Yang Xuemin, Yang Jingming, Wu Chaoyi, Min Enze, Zhang Shizhen, Zhang Zaiwang, Zhang Guangyin, Chen Yuniang, Chen Weida, Fan Quan, Zhou Yulan, Zhou Shutao, Zheng Zhenmiao, Zhao Jinsheng, Zhao Jun, Hao Deqing, Yu Aifeng, Qian Duanyou, Xu Datong, Guo Xilu, Huang Shiji, Huang Zhigang, Han Quanhua, Lu Da, Liao Canhui, Miao Tianrui, Dai Nianci	51	
1988	7th	Wang Runsheng, Wang Huizhu, Wei Li, Niu Ziwen, Shi Jinhong, Shi Peiyan, Lu Huilan, Ye Disheng, Bai Hua, Mu Guoguang, Xing Qifu, Nian Jinglin, Zhu Zhaofang, Qiao Weixiong, Liu Dongsheng, Liu Yunsheng, Liu Hangying, Sun Zhiqiang, Sun Hongyun, Li Chenggang, Li Boyong, Li Boxi, Li Zongfeng, Li Qing, Li Ruihuan, Yang Tianshou, Yang Jianbai, Yang Puchen, Wu Yongshi, Wu Zhen, Min Enze, Zhang Yaxiong, Zhang Zaiwang, Zhang Huaguo, Fan Quan, Zhou Bangji, Zhou Lang, Zheng Zhenmiao, Zhao Jinsheng, Hu Qili, Yao Jun, Nie Bichu, Xu Fengying, Huang Shiji, Zhang Wenjin, Han Enjia, Tong Xuanming, Liao Canhui, Mu Xiangyou, Heng Zhi, Dai Ximeng	51	
1993	8th	Ding Jianhua, Wang Guangying, Wang Guiming, Wang Runsheng, Wang Zengjing, Wei Li, Lu Huilan, Shen Yueming, Feng Rong, Mu Guoguang, Zhu Zhaofang, Qiao Weixiong, Liu Ruqi, Liu Jianzhang, Liu Hangying, Ji Xuecheng, Li Yunhe, Li Boxi, Li Xueqin, Li Ruihuan, Yang Wuchen, Yang Jingheng, Yang Puchen, Wu Yongshi, Wu Zhen, Min Enze, Zhang Lichang, Zhang Yonggen, Zhang Yaxiong, Zhang Baifeng, Chen Chaoying, Chen Haodong, Chen Defeng, Yi Zhikuan, Zheng Zhenmiao, Meng Zhaorui, Zhao Kezheng, Zhao Luyi, Yao Jun, Nie Bichu, Cui Shiguang, Kou Shiqing, Jiang Bingquan, Cai Shiyan, Cai Chaoqun, Miao Zhuen, Pan Yiqing, Mu Xiangyou, Dai Ximeng	49	
1998	9th	Yu Shuzhen, Wang Guangying, Wang Mingshi, Wang Jiayu, Lu Jinfeng, Pi Qiansheng, Shi Chunsheng, Zhu Tan, Qiao Xiaoyang, Liu Zhaofu, Liu Ruqi, Liu Zhijia, Liu Jinfeng, Mou Huaishan, Li Boyong, Li Xueqin, Li Shenglin, Li Ruihuan, Yang Jiajie, He Ronglin, Ying Songnian, Shen Jianye, Zhang Yuanlong, Zhang Lichang, Zhang Yingji, Zhang Hongren, Zhang Huiling (Korean), Chen Chaoying, Zheng Yi (Zhuang), Shan Ping, Meng Zhaorui, Zhao Kezheng, Zhao Luyi, Zhao Guifen, Hou Zixin, Yao Heqing, Nie Bichu, Gao Dezhan, Cui Shiguang, Kou Shiqing, Lei Shijun, Cai Shiyan, Pan Yiqing, Mu Xiangyou (Hui), Dai Ximeng	45	
2003	10th	Wang Liping (Manchu), Wang Zhiping, Fang Ming, Ning Shuchen, Pi Qiansheng, Xing Jun (female), Xing Kezhi, Shi Chunsheng, Zhu Tianhui (female), Zhuang Gonghui, Liu Zhijia, Liu Kaixin, Liu Shengyu, Liu Chongming (female), Sun Ying, Sun Xiaoqun, Li Renzhi (Hui), Li Yali, Li Shuwen, Li Quanshan, Yang Wencheng, Yang Xiaotang, Wu Yungui, He Yueping (female), He Zhimin, He Zhiyu, Shen Donghai, Zhang Lichang, Zhang Chunsheng, Zhang Yu, Zhang Huiling (female, Korean), Shan Ping, Fang Fengyou, Zhao Kezheng, Zhao Mei (female, Manchu), Hou Zixin, Yao Heqing, Guo Linqing, Cao Dazheng, Cui Shiguang, Liang Yingguang, Teng Yong, Cai Shiyan, Mu Xiangyou (Hui), Dai Xianglong .	45	
2008	11th	Yu Rumin, Yu Pei, Ma Jie (female, Hui), Wang Aijian (female), Mao Yanjun (female), Fang Ming, Deng Zhonghan, Bao Jingling, Feng Shuping (female), Xing Kezhi, Zhu Tianhui (female), Zhu Liping (female), Liu Kaixin, Liu Shengyu, Liu Xiaojian, Yan Xijun, Sun Hailin, Li Fengqin (female), Li Quanxi (Hui), Li Shuwen, Yang Fugang, He Zhimin, He Shushan, Shen Jiacong, Zhang Fengbao, Zhang Youhui, Zhang Liping (female, Mongolian), Zhang Boli, Zhang Junbin, Zhang Xiaoyan (female), Zhang Gaoli, Zhang Jiyu, Zhang Zhaoyi, Gou Lijun, Fang Fengyou, Zhao Mei (female, Manchu), Rao Zihe, Guo Qingping (Manchu), Huang Xingguo, Cao Dazheng, Gong Ke, Cheng Jinpei, Jin Runcheng, Huo Bing, Mu Xiangyou (Hui)	45	
2013	12th	Yu Shiping, Wan Wenya (female), Ma Jie (female, Hui), Ma Lan (female), Wang Xianhua, Mao Yanjun (female), Kong Xiaoyan (female), Shi Lianxi (female), Bao Jingling, Feng Shuping (female), Xing Kezhi, Liu Kaixin, Liu Shengyu, Yan Xijun, Guan Mucun (female, Manchu), Xu Xi, Sun Baoshu, Sun Chunlan (female), Li Shaoping, Li Shuqi, Li Jiajun, Li Shenglin, Li Chaoxing, Xiao Huaiyuan, He Zhimin, Zhang Zhiqiang, Zhang Boli, Zhang Jie, Zhang Gaoli, Zhang Jiyu, Chen Yongchuan, Lin Tiegang, Ou Chengzhong, Zhou Qilin, Zhou Chaohong (female), Zong Guoying, Huang Xingguo, Gong Ke, Dou Shuhua, Cai Jiming, Xue Haiying (female), Huo Bing, Mu Xiangyou (Hui)	43	
2018	13th	Caihua, Ma Jie, Wang Xiaoyun, Wang Shengming, Wang Honghai, Wang Yan, Deng Kai, Deng Xiuming, Ye Zanping, Gong Jianli, Liu Wei, Qi Yu, Guan Mucun, Sun Fengyuan, Li Gang, Li Xiang, Li Jiajun, Li Hongzhong, Li Jing, Li Wei, Yang Guang, Yang Maorong, Yang Baoling, Xiao Huaiyuan, Qiu Licheng, Zhang Boli, Zhang Zhilong, Yuan Guangrui, Zhou Zhenhai, Zhou Chaohong, Zhou Derui, Duan Chunhua, Gong Ming, Gao Yubao, Gao Jinghong, Guo Hongjing, Xi Zhen, Wen Juan, Xie Jinqiu, Liao Guoxun	42	
2023	14th	Bu Xianhe, Yu Xubo, Ma Yanhe, Wang Zhiping, Wang Jinsong, Ai Ding, Lu Jing, Cheng Weidong, Xiang Qiao, Li Gang, Li Jing, Yang Xianjin, Yang Baoling, Wu Renbiao, Wu Lixiang, Zhang Gong, Zhang Shuibo, Zhang Zhiyong, Zhang Boli, Zhang Ronghua, Zhang Zhenlian, Zhang Tao, Chen Fengchao, Chen Jun, Chen Yulu, Chen Min'er, Chen Fukuan, Chen Fuli, Zhou Chaohong, Shan Zefeng, Meng Guanglu, Gu Tianyi, Xu Xiao, Guo Hongjing, Cao Hongming, Yan Hongtao, Yu Yunlin, Lai Yawen	39	
