= Guangxi delegation to the National People's Congress =

Guangxi Zhuang Autonomous Region Delegation to the National People's Congress
- 全国人民代表大会广西壮族自治区代表团
- Delegation for the National People's Congress
- Map showing the location of the Guangxi Zhuang Autonomous Region
- Electoral unit: Guangxi Zhuang Autonomous Region
- Population: 50,126,804

Current Delegation
- Created: 1954
- Seats: 91
- Head of delegation: Liu Ning
- Regional People's Congress: Guangxi Zhuang Autonomous Regional People's Congress

The Guangxi Zhuang Autonomous Region delegation to the National People's Congress is a delegation composed of deputies representing Guangxi Zhuang Autonomous Region within the National People's Congress (NPC), the supreme organ of state power of the People's Republic of China. NPC deputies from Guangxi are officially elected by the Guangxi Zhuang Autonomous Region People's Congress.

== List of deputies ==
Year	NPC session	Deputies	Number of deputies	Ref.
1954	1st	Qiu Yuchi, Cheng Fangwu, Li Renren, Li Jishen, Jin Baosheng, Wei Zhangping, Wei Guoqing, Qu Tangliang, Zhang Yunyi, Zhang Shengzhen, Liang Huaxin, Mo Naiqun, Mo Shouquan, Guo Cheng, Chen Cisheng, Chen Jiyi, Chen Manyuan, Chen Mingshu, Qin Bo, Qin Yingji, Fei Zhendong, Huang Zheng, Huang Shaohong, Huang Xianfan, Huang Rong, Huang Lianhui, Yang Wengui, Yang Dongchun, Lei Rongke, Zhao Shitong, Zhao Lequn, Pan Gu, Jiang Zaiqiu, Li Ming, Lu Shaowu, Xie Fumin, Xie Hechou, Lan Changfa	38	
1959	2nd	Wei Guoqing, Wei Zhangping, Qu Tangliang (female), Gan Huaiyi, Shi Zhaotang, Lu Shaowu, Ye Pei, Qiu Yuchi, Li Renren, Li Jishen, Chen Cisheng, Chen Jiyi, Cheng Fangwu, Lin Kewu, Zhang Yunyi, Zhang Shengzhen, Jin Baosheng, Zhao Shitong, Zhao Lequn, Liang Huaxin, Guo Cheng, Mo Naiqun, Mo Shouquan, Qin Yingji, Qin Bo, Huang Zheng, Huang Juping, Huang Rong, Huang Lianhui (female), Cheng Shutian, Lei Rongke, Lan Changfa, Yang Wengui, Yang Dongchun, Jiang Zaiqiu, Li Ming (female), Xie Fumin, Xie Hechou	38	
1964	3rd	Wang Dazhong, Wei Rirong, Wei Yutang, Wei Zhenghui, Wei Guoqing, Wei Mengkun, Wei Zhangping, Qu Tangliang, Gan Jialiao, Gan Huaiyi, Gan Chengze, Shi Zhaotang, Lu Changxiong, Lu Shaowu, Lu Xianshu, Lu Baoting, Lu Yannan, Ye Pei, Tian Ke, Tang Youyan, Tang Songnian, Liu Qingshan, Wu Jinnan, Ren Guozhang, Na Shunhe, Li Weikun, Li Renren, Yang Wengui, Yang Dongchun, Yang Zongde, Yang Hao, Wu Zhongwei, Zhang Yunyi, Zhang Shengzhen, Zhang Jingning, Lu Rongshu, Lu Yiqian, Chen Cisheng, Chen Bokang, Chen Yanqiao, Chen Zhen, Zheng Jianxuan, Lin Kewu Lin Peihua, Ou Zhifu, Jin Baosheng, Shi Ruwei, Zhao Shitong, Zhao Erlu, Zhao Lequn, Zhao Mingjian, Zhao Peiying, Zhong Fuxiang, Zhong Jixin, He Ximing, Guo Cheng, Qin Zhenwu, Ban Yuhuan, Mo Naiqun, Mo Shouquan, Mo Chunrong, Mo Jin, Yan Xiuying, Liang Huaxin, Ma Jumei, Yan Guangcai, Yin Ying'ao, Xie Fumin, Xie Yinglian, Xie Fuhui, Xie Hechou, Huang Rushao, Huang Zheng, Huang Juping, Huang Rong, Huang Lianhui, Jiang Zaiqiu, Jiang Lizhen, Qin Yingji, Qin Bo, Cheng Ruizong, Lan Changfa, Liao Xihe, Tan Nanding, Pan Shihua, Li Dayu, Li Ming	72	
1975	4th	Wan Tangpo, Wang Donglian, Wang Mingrong, Wang Yiren, Wei Guoqing, Wei Jinxiu, Wei Shanxiu, Mao Fengluan, Deng Shujun, Shi Zhaotang, Lu Shijie, Lu Xianda, Zhu Weifeng, Qiao Xiaoguang, Liu Yunsheng, Liu Jun, Nong Bangxiu, Lu Chaoshu, Su Mingying, Li Tiande, Li Huahui, Li Qigao, Yang Dean, Xiao Han, Wu Yili, Cen Zekao, He Huiguang, Zou Degen, Wang Maoli, Zhang Meijian, Lu Weidong, Lu Rongshu, Chen Wenhua, Chen Qipin, Lin Qunying, Lin Runian Luo Ziyue, Zhou Peifeng, Zheng Jianxuan, Zhao Huiqun, Hu Cuijin, Zhong Chenglin, Zhong Lianying, Mo Naiqun, Mo Zilin, Jia Fengying, Huang Xiuyan, Huang Zuoqin, Huang Jinxian, Huang Fawen, Huang Shaoxing, Huang Rong, Huang Cairen, Huang Yuqiong, Huang Yuqun, Huang Xinming, Liang Jiquan, Liang Lianzhen, Jiang Guilan, Qin Zhiwen, Qin Yingji, Qin Hongguang, Zeng Chunsheng, Zeng Xianliang, Lan Jianbang, Lan Rongying, Liao Yongshi, Tan Yikun, Tan Suzhen, Li Guangwang, Yan Jingtang, Pan Yanhua	84	
1978	5th	Wang Pijian, Wang Guiying, Wei Zhenghui, Wei Junyi, Wei Sheng, Yu Rongjun, Gan Huaiyi, Gan Niegou, Shi Zhaotang, Shi Yumo, Lu Shaowu, Lu Chaozhu, Ran Dagu, Feng Guilian, Qiao Xiaoguang, Ren Xianchun, Liu Guihua, Liu Peigui, Nong Xiulan, Du Yi, Li Zhihong, Li Zhishu, Li Zhenhui, Li Zhenqian, Li Guixiang, Yang Youfang, Yang Wencai, Yang Dongchun, Yang Qingshu, Yang Huiming, Xiao Han, Wu Qiongying, He Jinlian, Zhang Longhua, Zhang Guoying, Lu Wanjia, Lu Weidong, Lu Wanzhen, Lu Rongshu, Chen Cisheng, Chen Caifu, Chen Manling, Chen Xi, Fan Guojia, Lin Yujiao, Lin Hua, Lin Mingshui, Luo Yefen, Luo Zhouwen, Jin Baosheng, Zheng Jianxuan, Zhao Shanliang, Zhong Jixin, Yao Jinji, Mo Naiqun, Mo Shouquan, Jia Liyi, Huang Yujuan, Huang Honglan, Huang Zuoqin, Huang Huanchang, Huang Rong, Huang Jie, Huang Guidi, Huang Chaobang, Pan Zuojie, Pan Jun, Kang Zhengde, Liang Jiquan, Liang Chengye, Liang Binghe, Liang Zhenhuai, Liang Caiqin, Liang Diaohua, Peng Lichun, Qin Yongji, Qin Shaoying, Qin Jiekang, Zeng Yong, Liao Guangneng, Tan Fengxian, Li Haibo, Pan Lie, Pan Chuhua	86	
1983	6th	Wang Jun, Wei Chunshu, Wei Qiumei, Wei Zhenxian, Wei Yulian, Yu Wen, Yu Rongjun, Gan Huaiyi, Gan Zongrong, Shi Zhaotang, Long Chuan, Long Tingba, Lu Chaozhu, Qiu Wenyi, Yin Wu, Lü Jianxing, Liu Zhuxi, Liu Zhenhua, Jiang Jiafu, Su Zhixian, Li Ning, Li Aiyuan, Li Kanggui, Li Chaodong, Yang Yongjin, Xiao Lei, Wu Xiufang, Wu Miaoshen, Wu Pinqing, Yu Mingyan, Zhang Guoying, Lu Wuting, Lu Juntin, Lu Yidong, Lu Rongshu, Chen Runfen, Chen Hongzhi, Chen Qiongzhen, Zhou Feixiong, Zhou Fengxi, Zhao Yisheng, Zhao Mingjian, Rong Qiguang Zhong Feng, Zhong Jixin, Hou Shihua, He Xianglin, Ban Xiuwen, Yuan Shaohe, Mo Naiqun, Jia Fengying, Xu Buji, Xu Mingkui, Xu Di, Tang Lianying, Huang Dahong, Huang Weizhi, Huang Jiangshan, Huang Rong, Huang Baoyao, Huang Chaobang, Huang Hu, Huang Biying, Mei Pinqing, Yin Shihao, Fu Yijun, Pan Zuojie, Liang Shan, Liang Yujin, Liang Zhaoyu, Qin Yingji, Qin Xinhu, Xie Jiefang, Xie Tieli, Lan Fangwan, Meng Qishou, Lei Kai, Lei Aizu, Tan Pizhen, Tan Wu, Tan Xuejun, Xiong Junfu, Li Yuhua, Li Huiqiong, Li Yuming, Pan Chuhua	87	
1988	7th	Wang Yiding, Wang Zhaobang, Wang Tengjin, Wei Yuanwei, Wei Shijun, Wei Chunshu, Wei Jianzheng, Wei Meifang, Wei Jiaguo, Wei Jisong, Wen Ge, Gan Ku, Gan Zongrong, Ping Lei, Lu Chongliang, Tian Yumei, Cheng Kejie, Zhu Yuexiu, Liu Zhibing, Liu Meilin, Ruan Chengde, Su Jianji, Li Dingmin, Li Yulin, Li Ning, Li Zhaoreng, Li Zhaozhuo, Li Minghui, Li Qicheng, Li Shang'an, Li Guogang, Li Guoyun, Li Enchao, Li E, Yang Songfei, Xiao Yuxue, Wu Xiang, He Hui, Yu Zhaoguang, Yu Songling, Zou Yu, Zhang Shugui, Zhang Youjun, Zhang Zunan Lu Ningning, Lu Chengxun, Chen An, Chen Liaoqiu, Chen Zhenyu, Lin Jianqing, Lin Chaoqun, Lin Ruiyu, Luo Lijia, Zhou Feixiong, Zhou Jun, Feng Xuhua, Yun Yanshi, Qin Chenggong, Mo Liming, Xu Xuehong, Ling Yunzhi, Tang Peizhu, Tao Aiying, Huang Hanyun, Huang Renwen, Huang Renwu, Huang Xuxuan, Huang Zhiying, Huang Shaoliang, Huang Rong, Liang Xiuhua, Liang Huanxin, Liang Xinan, Peng Yizi, Jiang Bingguang, Jiang Yi, Qin Zhigang, Xie Naikun, Xie Tieli, Lan Huaipeng, Liao Yonglian, Liao Zhenzhong, Tan Meixing, Fan Jianren, Li Xiuye, Li Yuming, Wei Shurang		
1993	8th	Wang Yanyi, Wang Zhaobang, Wang Suzhou, Wei Yuanwei, Wei Rike, Wei Wenlin, Wei Zhuangfan, Wei Xiurong, Wei Qishuai, Wei Lingdun, Wei Jianzheng, Wei Shuying, Wei Zuxing, Wei Dingxun, Mao Xuhui, Gan Xiaohui, Gan Ku, Zuo Ziming, Lu Lifen, Lu Xingu, Shuai Liguo, Cheng Kejie, Zhu Jiaqing, Ren Xianchun, Liu Mingzu, Liu Zhibing, Liu Jiasen, Liu Dexin, Nong Yuande, Su Yishu, Su Jianji, Li Zhaoreng, Li Zhaosheng, Li Jiheng, Li Ke, Li Qicheng, Li Jingwen, Yang Jianzhong, Yang Zhengzhong, Cen Hongping, He Kang, She Guoxin, Shen Beihai, Song Fumin, Zhang Zu Nan, Lu Ningning, Lu Jianchang, Chen Can, Chen Shilu, Lin Chaoqun, Zhou Jun, Zhou Zusen, Zheng Jinmei, Meng Guocai, Zhao Yulin, Zhao Fulin, Zhao Ruilong, Yu Fanglin, Hong Puzhou, Yuan Fenglan, Xia Baofang, Xu Aili, Ling Kebin, Gao Chengzhi, Tang Peizhu, Tao Aiying, Huang Shaoxiong, Huang Lanying, Huang Hanru, Huang Yonghui, Huang Xiumei, Huang Zongyan, Huang Baoyao, Liang Wenshu, Liang Huanxin, Cheng Siyuan, Zeng Zongbiao, Xie Tuluan, Xie Ruxuan, Xie Tieli, Xie Chaojie, Meng Rongxing, Lei Yu, Liao Chenyun, Liao Jingsheng, Tan Sanchuan, Li Xiaoxian, Pan Zhide, Pan Guian	89	
1998	9th	Ding Tingmo, Ding Guangen, Ma Biao (Zhuang), Wang Shuqing, Wei Yuerong (Zhuang), Wei Wenlin (Zhuang), Wei Zili (Maonan), Wei Zhaozhong (Zhuang), Wei Quanying (Zhuang), Wei Jiajie (Zhuang), Wei Jisong (Zhuang), Wei Mincui (Zhuang), Wei Qingwen, Wei Meifen, Che Rongfu, Wen Hequn, Fang Hao, Deng Wen (Zhuang), Lu Weizhong, Lu Lifen (Zhuang), Lu Shengbing (Miao), Liu Qingning (Zhuang), Liu Hong, Liu Biqing, Sun Yu (Zhuang), Yan Keqiang (Zhuang), Li Liming (Zhuang), Li Ziming, Li Zhaozhuo (Zhuang), Li Jinzao, Yang Caishou, Yang Bingzhong (Zhuang), Yang Daoxi, Wu Chengde (Miao), Cen Hongping, He Ling (Jing). He Peisong (Zhuang), Zou Jieming, Song Jidong, Song Jisi, Zhang Yueying, Zhang Tingdeng (Zhuang), Zhang Zunan (Zhuang), Zhang Jingde (Zhuang), Zhang Mujie, Lu Yun (Zhuang), Lu Yuying (Zhuang), Lu Ningning (Zhuang), Lu Binghua (Zhuang), Feng Henggao (Yao), Lin Dongchi (Zhuang), Lin Can (Zhuang), Lin Guoqiang, Luo Shegao (Zhuang), Zhou Yingming (Zhuang), Zhou Zusen (Yao), Meng Guocai, Zhao Xiao'ai, Zhao Fulin, Hu Jiangyao (Dong), Yao Meilan,~~Mo Jun~~(Zhuang ethnic group)~~Mo Zhenhan~~(Zhuang), Xia Baofang, Ni Longsheng, Tang Peizhu (Zhuang), Huang Fangfang (Zhuang), Huang Lanying (Zhuang), Huang Cheng (Zhuang), Huang Gesheng (Zhuang), Huang Daowei, Cao Bochun, Yin Jingsheng (Mulao), Liang Yuxiang, Liang Huanxin, Jiang Chunji, Qin Fangping (Zhuang), Qin Xiuquan (Zhuang), Qin Jianping (Zhuang), Qin Long (Zhuang), Qin Ruixiang, Qin Fuzhu (Yao), Cheng Siyuan, Wen Jilin, Zhan Zongyou (Zhuang), Cai Yonglun, Liao Nengcheng (Zhuang), Xiong Binggang (Zhuang), Pan Renjiao (Zhuang), Pan Aiqun (Zhuang)	90	
2003	10th	Ding Xuehui, Nai Donghong (Zhuang), Wang Wanbin, Wang Yongyu (Zhuang), Wang Mengkui, Wang Yuefei, Wei Xingli (Zhuang), Wei Ying (female, Zhuang), Wei Mingshan (Miao), Wei Liuchun (female, Zhuang), Wei Jianeng (Zhuang), Wei Qingwen, Wei Rui (Yao), Yin Jianguo, Deng Wen (Zhuang), Gan Youping (Zhuang), Gan Yingzi (female, Zhuang), Shi Yingwen, Bai Xiaojun (Hui), Bai Hexiang, Lan Jichun (Miao), Liu Qing Ning (Zhuang), Liu Jun, Liu Mingda, Liu Weiling (female, Jing), Ruan Wenzhong, Sun Yi (female, Zhuang), Li Liming (Zhuang), Li Hanjin, Li Daqiu, Li Ziming, Li Zhaozhuo (Zhuang), Li Mingfeng (Zhuang), Li Jinzao, Li Yanning (female, Zhuang), Li Min (female, Zhuang), Li Kang (female, Zhuang), Yang Caishou, Wu Wei, He Peisong (Zhuang), Shen Chunyao, Song Liuhua (female, Zhuang), Zhang Shaokang, Zhang Xiulong, Zhang Zheng (female, Zhuang), Zhang Zhengpo (Zhuang), Lu Yun (female, Zhuang), Lu Bing (Zhuang), Lu Minglin (Zhuang), Lu Binghua (Zhuang), Chen Zhili (female), Chen Xiangqun, Chen Lidan, Feng Henggao (Yao), Lin Dongchi (female, Zhuang), Lin Guoqiang, Lin Yuan, Lin De, Lin Fan (Zhuang), Luo Yinglin (female, Zhuang), Zhou Yaxian (female), Zhou Jianjun, Zhou Guiying (female, Zhuang), Zhong Xiangting (Zhuang), Mo Wenzhen (Zhuang, Mo Jianfang (female), Mo Xiansheng, Xu Qinheng (Mulao), Guo Yongyun, Tang Jian (Yao), Huang Fangfang (Zhuang), Huang Qiuyan (female, Zhuang), Huang Huansheng (Zhuang), Cao Bochun, Liang Richun (Dong), Liang Chunlu, Liang Liang (Zhuang), Dong Tianfu (Zhuang), Qin Rifei (Zhuang), Qin Kejiang (Maonan), Qin Zengzhi (Zhuang), Wen Jilin, Lai Mei, Liao Nengcheng (Zhuang), Pan Yongzhong (Zhuang), Pan Ye(Female, Yao ethnicity), Mo Yuanyin (female, Zhuang ethnicity)	87	
2008	11th	Nai Donghong (Zhuang), Ma Biao (Zhuang), Wang Youwei (female, Zhuang), Wang Xiaohua, Wang Aiqin (female, Zhuang), Wei Feiyan (female, Zhuang), Wei Fenping (female, Zhuang), Wei Liuchun (female, Zhuang), Deng Wen (Zhuang), Gan Shanze (Zhuang), Shi Yingwen, Hui Liangyu (Hui), Xiang Huiling (female, Zhuang), Liu Zhengdong, Liu Qingning (Zhuang), Tang Shibao, Nong Yimei (female, Zhuang), Nong Zhiyi (Zhuang), Su Mingfang (Jing) Su Daoyan, Li Hanjin, Li Lianning, Li Jinzao, Li Yanning (female, Zhuang), Li Min (female, Zhuang), Yang Jian, Yang Shengchuan (Miao), Yang Qin (female, Zhuang), Lian Younong, Xiao Hua (Tujia), Wu Guanglin (Zhuang), Wu Junjun (Zhuang), Wu Heng, Wu Jiaquan (Mulao), Yu Yuanhui (Yao), Shen Bingsheng (Zhuang), Zhang Shaokang, Zhang Xiulong, Lu Yun (female, Zhuang), Lu Bing (Zhuang), Lu Minglin (Zhuang), Lu Xuemei (Female, Zhuang ethnicity), Chen Gang, Chen Zhong, Chen Xiangqun, Chen Guanliang, Chen Lidan, Chen Wu (Zhuang ethnicity), Chen Qiuhua, Shao Liping, Lin Fan (Zhuang ethnicity), Luo Jianping, Luo Yaling (female, Yao ethnicity), Luo Dianlong (Zhuang ethnicity), Luo Liming (Zhuang ethnicity), Jin Xiangjun, Zhou Ruqiang (Zhuang ethnicity), Zhou Huaikang, Zhou Jianjun, Zhou Jian (Zhuang ethnicity), Zhao Guikun (Yao ethnicity), Mo Xiaosha (female, Zhuang ethnicity), Mo Yanshi, Yan Ping, Guo Shengkun, Tang Chengliang, Huang Fangfang (Zhuang ethnicity), Huang Rumei (Female, Zhuang; Huang Liangbo ; Huang Helong (Zhuang); Huang Qiudi (female, Zhuang); Cao Bochun ; Yan Baoping (female); Liang Qibo ; Peng Zuyi (Yao) ; Dong Ling (Miao); Jiang Xiangming (Maonan); Qin Jianning (female, Zhuang); Fu Hongyu ; Xie Naitang ; Lan Tianli (Zhuang); Lan Shengxin (Zhuang); Meng Tieying (female, Zhuang); Lai Yimin (Dong); Lai Jian'an ; Liao Ru'en (Zhuang); Pan Yongzhong (Zhuang); Pan Xuehong (female, Zhuang)	88	
2013	12th	Ma Biao (Zhuang), Wang Kai, Wang Bihan, Wei Feiyan (female, Zhuang), Wei Liping (female, Zhuang), Wei Guoqiu (Zhuang), Wei Liuchun (female, Zhuang), Wei Qiuli (Zhuang), Ya Tingke (Zhuang), Deng Xian (Zhuang), Gan Shanze (Zhuang), Gan Jinghua (female, Zhuang), Long Liping (female, Zhuang), Lu Qineng (female, Zhuang), Lu Xianbian (Zhuang), Bai Xi (Manchu), Feng Bihong (female, Zhuang), Zhu Xueqing, Zhu Fengmin, Zhu Huiying (female), Xiang Huiling (female, Zhuang), Wei Chaoan, ~~Xu Shuqing (female)~~ Nong Weihong (female, Zhuang), Ruan Aixing (Jing), Su Jiahong (Zhuang), Li Ningbo, Li Yonglin, Li Zhigang, Li Lianning, Li Xinrong (female, Zhuang), Li Min (female, Zhuang), Li Kang (female, Zhuang), Li Sen (Zhuang), Yang Xiaoping, Yang Herong, Yang Daoxi, Xiao Yingzi (female, Zhuang), Wu Yongchun (Dong), Wu Heng, He Xinxing, Yu Renchun (Zhuang), Zhang Qianli (Manchu), Zhang Zhenyu (Zhuang), Zhang Fuwei (Zhuang), Chen Zhong, Chen Wu (Zhuang), Chen Baoshan (Zhuang), Lin Wu Min (Yao), Luo Chaoyang (Zhuang), Luo Dianlong (Zhuang), Zhou Yijue (Zhuang), Zhou Hongbo, Zhou Jianjun, Zhou Jiabin, Zheng Junkang, Zhao Deming (Yao), Zhong Zhiying (female), Zhu Xuelan (female, Yao), Mo Xiaosha (female, Zhuang), Mo Xiaofeng (female, Zhuang), Mo Gongming, Yan Ping, Guo Shengkun, Tang Nong, Tang Jinbo (Zhuang), Huang Fangfang (Zhuang), Huang Weijing, Huang Ke (Zhuang), Huang Qijiang (Zhuang), Huang Chao (female, Zhuang), Huang Daowei, Cui Zhiyou, ~~Yin Bangke (Mulao)~~ Yan Baoping (female), Liang Lina (female), Liang Shengli (Zhuang), Peng Qinghua, Jiang Jinkun (Miao), Qin Jianning (female, Zhuang), Cheng Ke, Xie Shimei (female, Miao), Xie Xianshu, Lan Chuntao (female, Yao), Lan Fengjie (Zhuang), Lai Xuejia, Tan Mengxi (Maonan), Fan Yiping (Zhuang), Pan Xiali (female, Yao), Dai Bo	90	
2018	13th	Ma Kong (Miao), Wang Huasheng, Wang Yuefei, Wei Tao (Zhuang), Wei Nianzhou (Zhuang), Wei Hongmei (female, Zhuang), Wei Zhenyi (Zhuang), Wei Zhaohui (female, Zhuang), Deng Dayu (female, Miao), Deng Guifang (female, Zhuang), Gan Chulin, Lu Xianbian (Zhuang), Lan Yan (female, Yao), Feng Haiyan (female, Zhuang), Zhu Huiying (female), Liu Ruyuan, ~~Liu~~ Hongwu, Guan Li, Xu Yanni (female), Nong Rong (Zhuang), Nong Weihong (female, Zhuang), Mou Yu Chang, Sun Yan (female), Sun Dawei, Li Kang (female, Zhuang), Li Yanqiang, Li Keqiang, Li Jieyun, Wu Gang (Dong), Wu Wei, Wu Jieqiu (female, Zhuang), He Liangjun, Zou Shengtin (Mulao), Lu Dimin (Zhuang), Lu Aiyi (female, Zhuang), Chen Kun (female), Chen Wu (Zhuang), Chen Donghui, Chen Zhongnan, Chen Jianjun (Zhuang), Chen Baoshan (Zhuang), Lin Guan (Zhuang), Lin Shaoqun (female, Zhuang), Lin Wenxiong (Zhuang), Yi Jie, Luo Yan (Female), Luo Jinren (Zhuang), Luo Chaoyang (Zhuang), Zhou Lian (Zhuang), Zhou Hongbo, Zhou Yijue (Zhuang), Zheng Junli (Yao), Fang Lingmin, Zhu Xuelan (female, Yao), Qin Chuncheng, Ban Huazhong (Zhuang), Ban Zhongbai (Zhuang), Mo Xiaofeng (female, Zhuang), Mo Huafu, Guo Yilu (Zhuang), ~~Tang Nong~~, Tang Jinbo (Zhuang), Huang Chao (female, Zhuang), Huang Shiyong (Zhuang), Huang Huachun (female, Zhuang), Huang Liting (female, Jing), Huang Bingfeng (Maonan), Huang Hailong (Zhuang), Huang Haikun, Mei Shiwen, ~~Cui Yu~~ (female), Cui Zhiyou, Peng Shihua (Miao), Peng Qinghua, Chuai Xiaoyong, Qin Hong (female, Zhuang), Qin Jianning (female, Zhuang), Wen Shugang, Zeng Guang'an, Lei Hong (female), Lei Yingmin, Liao Yuying (female, Zhuang), Liao Ailian (female, Zhuang), Tan Bin, Zhai Jingsong (Zhuang), Fan Yiping (Zhuang), Pan Ping (female, Zhuang), Pan Wendao (Zhuang), Pan Guixian (female, Zhuang)	89	
2023	14th	Wang Jun, Wang Yi, Wang Guangning, Wei Lina, Wei Hongbo, Wei Hengjiao, Wei Zhenren, Fang Chunming, Fang Nenglie, Yin Yanzhen, Deng Dayu, Deng Xiuxin, Deng Yingying, Deng Langni, Shi Rufei, Tian Dailin, Bai Songtao, Zhu Huidong, Tang Jianwei, Sun Yan, Sun Xiyan, Su Yuanyuan, Li Li, Li Chu, Li Chunyan, Li Haisheng, Li Haihua, Li Yanfeng, Yang Zhengping, Wu Guojun, Chi Wei, Zhang Zhuang, Lu Dimin, Chen Gang, Chen Cheng, Chen Zhen, Chen Jieying, Chen Guie, Chen Jiake, Mao Zhonghua, Lin Wenxiong, Luo Tian, Luo Jinren, Luo Chao Yang, Zhou Yijue, Zhou Yingfeng, Zheng Junli, Fang Lingmin, Hu Fan, Zhong Can, Zhong Changzi, Hou Gang, Yao Zuoping, Qin Qingfang, Ban Ning, Mo Xiaofeng, Mo Huafu, Tang Yiang, Huang Jiang, Huang Chao, Huang Chenghui, Huang Huachun, Huang Junhua, Huang Hailong, Huang Tanmei, Huang Zhiyu, Lu Xinshe, Liang Libin, Peng Daiyuan, Dong Yuelin, Dong Jingwei, Qin Hong, Qin Baohua, Qin Jianning, Qin Chunfen, Qin Tianjing, Lan Lin, Lan Jiaozhi, Meng Quan, Liao Yuying, Liao Heming, Tan Peng, Tan Guohe, Li Xujun, Pan Wendao, Pan Guixian, Wei Tao	91	
