= Delegations to the National People's Congress =

The National People's Congress (NPC), the supreme organ of state power of the People's Republic of China (PRC), is elected by the people's congresses of each province-level division, except for Hong Kong, Macau, Taiwan, and the People's Liberation Army and People's Armed Police, whose delegations are elected according to specific procedures. The delegations are formed according to their respective constituencies. During formal or preparatory meetings of the NPC, discussions are conducted in groups according to the delegations. There are currently 35 delegations, including 31 delegations from mainland province-level administrative units, 2 delegations from special administrative regions, a delegation from the PRC's claimed Taiwan Province, and a joint delegation from the People's Liberation Army and the People's Armed Police.

== Head of delegation ==
The head of a delegation to the National People's Congress (NPC) is referred to as the head of the NPC delegation or simply the head of the delegation. Each NPC delegation has a head. When the NPC holds a formal meeting or a preparatory meeting and discussions are conducted in groups by delegation, the head of the delegation has special presiding power in the introduction and discussion of motions.

== Delegations ==
The head of the delegation at the most recent plenary session of the People's Congress shall be the standard.

Delegation	Seats	Delegation leader
Beijing Municipality	53	Li Xiuling
Tianjin Municipality	40	Yu Yunlin
Hebei Province	123	Ni Yuefeng
Shanxi Province	68	Lan Fo'an
Inner Mongolia Autonomous Region	58	Sun Shaocheng
Liaoning Province	94	Hao Peng
Jilin Province	60	Jing Junhai
Heilongjiang Province	84	Xu Qin
Shanghai Municipality	57	
Jiangsu Province	144	Xin Changxing
Zhejiang Province	99	Yi Lianhong
Anhui Province	111	Zheng Shanjie
Fujian Province	74	Zhou Zuyi
Jiangxi Province	81	Yin Hong
Shandong Province	173	Lin Wu
Henan Province	174	Lou Yangsheng
Hubei Province	113	Wang Menghui
Hunan Province	118	Zhang Qingwei
Guangdong Province	169	Huang Chuping
Guangxi Zhuang Autonomous Region	91	Liu Ning
Hainan Province	26	Shen Xiaoming
Chongqing Municipality	59	Wang Jiong
Sichuan Province	147	Wang Xiaohui
Guizhou Province	75	Xu Lin
Yunnan Province	91	Wang Ning
Tibet Autonomous Region	24	Wang Junzheng
Shaanxi Province	69	Zhao Yide
Gansu Province	53	Hu Changsheng
Qinghai Province	24	Chen Gang
Ningxia Hui Autonomous Region	23	Liang Yanshun
Xinjiang Uygur Autonomous Region	60	Ma Xingrui
Hong Kong Special Administrative Region	36	Ma Fung-kwok
Macao Special Administrative Region	12	Liu Yiliang
Taiwan Province	13	Zheng Jianmin
People's Liberation Army and Armed Police Force	281	Zhang Youxia
