= Jilin delegation to the National People's Congress =

Jilin Delegation to the National People's Congress
- 全国人民代表大会吉林省代表团
- Delegation for the National People's Congress
- Map showing the location of Jilin Province
- Electoral unit: Jilin Province
- Population: 24,073,453

Current Delegation
- Created: 1954
- Seats: 60
- Head of delegation: Jing Junhai
- Provincial People's Congress: Jilin Provincial People's Congress

The Jilin delegation to the National People's Congress is a delegation composed of deputies representing Jilin Province within the National People's Congress (NPC), the highest organ of state power of the People's Republic of China. NPC deputies from the Jilin Province are officially elected by the Jilin Provincial People's Congress.

== List of deputies ==
Year	NPC sessions	Deputies	Number of deputies	Ref.
1954	1st	Yu Kaiquan, Zhu Dehai, Li Mengling, Jin Xinshu, Jin Shilong, Li Youwen, Min Ganghou, Xie Fang, Zhao Qingfu, Han En, Guan Shanfu		
1959	2nd	Yu Dequan, Wang Yuxian, Renqin Zhamusu, Liu Yaxiong (female), Guan Shanfu, Zhu Dehai, Song Jiehan, Li Chuanjiang, Li Diping, Cheng Shengsan, Zong Xiyun, Zhang Wenhai, Zhang Dexin, Jin Shilong, Jin Xinshu (female), Ji Yinglin, Tang Aoqing, Li Youwen, Xu Shouxuan, Feng Zhongyun, Zeng Zesheng, Min Ganghou, Yu Deyuan		
1964	3rd	Yu Min, Ma Mingfang, Fang Chuanliu, Wang Daheng, Wang Yuxian, Wang Zhengxu, Wang Yadong, Wang Xianghao, Wang Yi, Mao Cheng, Mao Henian, Renqin Zhamusu, Feng Zhongyun, Feng Xuan, Ye Decan, Liu Yaxiong, Liu Kejing, Liu Shikun, Liu Jinmei, Guan Shanfu, Pu Weixun, Cheng Shengsan, Lü Ronglin, Zhu Baoying, Zhu Jiming, Zhu Dehai, Sun Shunli, Sun Dianqing, Yin Yuzhang, Ji Yinglin, Song Renyuan, Li Chuanjiang, Li Yilin, Li Yong, Li Tongxi, Li Haoyuan, Li Zairou, Li Di Ping, Li Shanfu, Yang Fuhai, Wu Xuezhou, Wu Qing, Zhang Wei, Zhang Deqing, Zhang Dexin, Chen Guanrong, Chen Zhong, Zong Xiyun, Zheng Wanjun, Lin Tun, Jin Shilong, Jin Xinshu, Yue Xixin, Jiang Lanchun, Zhao Wanli, Zhao Dexian, Hao Yusheng, Guo Li, Guo Lanxiang, Tang Chuan, Tang Aoqing, Li Youwen, Gu Youfen, Qian Dawei, Qian Baogong, Xu Shouxuan, Tao Weisun, Kang Jingshi, Cui Qisheng, Sui Mingshan, Zeng Zesheng, Huang Shunyu, Yu Ping, Yu Deyuan, Fu Tongsheng, Cai Liusheng		
1975	4th	Ding Chengxiang, Ding Baohe, Ma Ruiting, Wang Daheng, Wang Wanchun, Wang Yujie, Wang Chengli, Wang Junqing, Wang Huaixiang, Yun Shubi, Ge Guizhi, Cong Degui, Bian Zhongke, Pu Weixun, Pu Chunzi, Lü Qingsen, Liu Sheng, Liu Xianming, Liu Jinghai, Liu Deyi, Qi Dianyun, Guan Budao Riji, Xu Zhenshu, Sun Chengsan, Ji Yinglin, Ji Jinglan, Ji Fugui, Su Li, Du Jingcheng, Li Kexiang, Li Chonghua, Li Qingfa, Yang Baolan, Wu Zhaodi, Zhang Yuwen, Zhang Yongxiang, Zhang Guoliang, Zhang Yanmei, Zhang Yunping, Chen Ruixin, Luo Yichun, Luo Buseng, Jin Mingkui, Jin Guilan, Zheng Jiqiao, Zheng Jizan, Zhao Caizhang, Zhao Fulu, Shi Zhanwen, Yao Meiling, Xuan Shunchang, Xu Guangchun, Xu Shouxuan, Hai Yuchen, Yan Guiyun, Cui Hailong, Kou Dexin, Zeng Qingyou, Pei Jiefang, Pan Shunqing, Wei Geming		
1978	5th	Yu Ke, Ma Dianchen, Wang Daheng, Wang Wanchun, Wang Yuxian, Wang Junqing, Wang Guizhi, Wang Enmao, Wang Xianghao, Wang Fu, Yun Shubi, Niu Shizhen, Fang Chuanliu, Yin Dehe, Shi Linqi, Feng Chunxin, Bian Shenghai, Pu Weixun, Pu Chunzi, Zhu Xiulan, Zhu Baoying, Cheng Shengsan, Liu Fengling, Liu Wengang, Liu Yuling, Liu Kejing, Qi Xiaodong, Guan Xiulan, Sun Liquan, Sun Shunli, Sun Sheng, Du Jingcheng, Li Chuanjiang, Li Yuxi, Li Wufu, Li Tongxi, Li Shang You, Yang Yanlin, Wu Shishu, Wu Xuezhou, Sha Yongliang, Zhang Kaijing, Zhang Tianmin, Zhang Yuwen, Zhang Yongxiang, Zhang Dexin, Chen Zhong, Chen Guilan, Shao Zhuxun, Shang Keming, Jin Xiulan, Jin Minghan, Jin Mingkui, Zhao Liancheng, Zhao Xiang, Jiang Wenxuan, Jiang Li, Jiang Diankui, Gong Yulin, Li Youwen, Xu Shouxuan, Guo Shuzhen, Tang Dahuai, Hai Yuchen, Cao Wankui, Sui Shicai, Si Ri'aodao, Han Guohai, Yu Riling, Xie Yulin, Cai Fulin, Cai Liusheng, Pei Jiefang		
1983	6th	Ding Shisheng, Yu Ke, Yu Lin, Yu Yanfu, Yu Hai, Wang Li, Wang Daren, Wang Daheng, Wang Zhankui, Wang Xiulan, Wang Hongliang, Wang Zhenying, Wang Xianghao, Niu Tianju, Mao Henian, Fang Chuanliu, Yin Mingshu, Ke Muyun, Shi Shan, Lu Lifen, Feng Yingkui, Feng Fujin, Lan Guilu, Xing Shaopeng, Xing Maoying, Pu Wenyi, Pu Longhao, Cheng Shengsan, Lü Da, Zhu Xiulan, Zhu Jinghang, Ren Xiuyun, Xiang Junshu, Liu Yuzhen, Liu Kejing, Liu Xuebao, Liu Shulin, Liu Meiyu, Guan Shanfu, Guan Zhongyu, Guan Yinhua, Sun Chengbin, Mou Lifang Du Jingcheng, Li Yuanshi, Li Zongtie, Yang Zhantao, Yang Xinren, Wu Shishu, Wu Xuezhou, She Yongzheng, Zou Juan, Zou Desheng, Zhang Yuwen, Zhang Chengkun, Zhang Dianqi, Zhang Dexin, Chen Weiqing, Chen Shulan, Chen Dingming, Fan Zhengyi, Jin Yongshun, Jin Xiulan, Zheng Yingshu, Zhao Nanqi, Zhao Xiu, Jiang Zhanfa, Lou Zhaoxian, Suo Jingxian, Chai Gongpu, Xu Ruren, Gao Di, Gao Huilan, Huang Jielin, Huang Baotong, Mei Xing, Cao Longhao, Kang Ronghuan, Yan Hongchen, Fu Zuopeng, Zeng Xiaozhen, Xie Yuwen, Xie Yulin, Ji Guorong, Dai Jinhua, Wei Chengxue		
1988	7th	Ding Shisheng, Yu Yanfu, Yu Xianzhang, Ma Ning, Ma Qiming, Wang Daren, Wang Zhongyu, Wang Zhenying, Wang Tan, Wang Xianghao, Wang Dianrong, Wang Jingyi, Bayinnamur, Feng Jianquan, Feng Fujin, Lan Guilu, Xing Shaopeng, Park Tae- soo, Park Moon- il, Cheng Shengsan, Hui Liangyu, Zhu Jinghang, Liu Shijie, Liu Kejing, Liu Caiyun, Guan Shanfu, An Taixiang, Sun Li, Sun Xiujun, Sun Shuchang, Sun Shuxiang, Sun Hengbin, Mou Lifang, Yan Keqiang, Su Fengqin, Li Yunfeng, Li Xibai, Li Zongtie, Li Ronghai, Li Shuo, Li Ruilin, Yang Xinren, Xiao Chengliang, Wu Shi Shu, Wu Jianmin, He Zhukang, She Yongzheng, Zhang Dejiang, Zhang Dexin, Chen Naifen, Chen Fangbin, Chen Hengyi, Chen Bingcong, Chen Yanyou, Chen Dingming, Fan Zhengyi, Lin Donghao, Shang Zhenling, Jin Xiulan, Zhou Yushun, Zheng Yingshu, Zhao Xiu, Hu Zhijuan, Duan Changyu, Jiang Guifeng, Geng Zhaojie, Suo Jingxian, Chai Gongpu, Xu Ruren, Xu Yinzhang, Gao Di, Gao Baohong, Gao Xiu, Gao Dexiang, Huang Baotong, Cao Longhao, Kang Ronghuan, Yan Hongchen, Liang Zhongli, Jiang Lanrui, Zhi Zuowen, Zeng Xiaozhen, Xie Yulin, Xie Shengyuan, Yan Lanfang, Xue Guangsheng, Huo Mingguang		
1993	8th	Ding Shisheng, Ma Zhanqing, Ma Ning, Wang Ziqing, Wang Wenfu, Wang Liping, Wang Binghuan, Wang Ge, Wang Jiaqi, Wang Xianghao, Wang Rulin, You Guo, Lu Zhimin, Lu Liangzhao, Qiu Huashen, Zhu Zhongmin, Wu Zhuoqun, Quan Zhezhu, Liu Xilin, Liu Ping, Liu Shuying, Guan Yanxia, Mi Fengjun, An Taixiang, An Li, Sun Yetang, Sun Youmin, Sun Deshen, Mou Lifang, Li Naijie, Li Yunfeng, Li Shu, Li Qiankuan, Li Zhenrong, Li Guiju, Li Tieying, Yang Xinren, Lian Jianshe, Wu Changshu, Wu Yufu, Wu Shishu, Wu Baohui, He Zhukang, Gu Changchun, Zhang Jin Tai, Zhang Quan, Zhang Mingyuan, Zhang Guiqin, Zhang Enxiang, Zhang Hailong, Zhang Jiaming, Chen Xiuli, Chen Mingzhi, Fan Shiliang, Jin Minxiong, Zhou Shaoxuan, Zhou Cuihua, Hao Fuxia, Zhan Yuechang, Hong Fuzeng, Yuan Baixiong, Geng Zhaojie, Nie Wenquan, Chai Gongpu, Xu Ruren, Gao Yan, Gao Jie, Gao Chao, Guo Yongde, Guo Xiaofeng, Guo Lingong, Huang Baiqu, Huang Baotong, Cao Longhao, Jiang Lanrui, Cheng Yuesun, Fu Wancai, Fu Jingyun, Lu Baofeng, Zeng Fanxu, Zeng Xiaozhen, Xie Yulin, Xie Shengyuan, Zang Guangxin, Zang Shengye, Erdunbagan, Huo Mingguang, Ju Guizhi		
1998	9th	Ma Ning, Ma Jichun, Ma Junqing, Wang Yunkun, Wang Qingzhi, Wang Chun, Wang Guofa, Wang Binghua, Wang Jiaqi, Wang Huanyong, Wang Weizhong, Wang Weicheng, Wang Zhaohuan, Urtu (Mongolian), Yin Aiqun, Lu Zhimin, Ye Caimin, Cheng Zishen, Liu Zhongshu, Liu Fengying, Liu Yulin, Liu Yongxin, Liu Xingyuan, Liu Shijun, Liu Runpu, Liu Shuying, Liu Xiang, Mou Lifang, Li Ben, Li Xiulin, Li Shu, Li Chunmin, Li Shu, Li Qiang (Manchu), Li Jinbin, Yang Shaoming, Yang Xianglan, Yang Xinren, Lian Jianshe, Wu Chang Shu (Korean), Wu Shishu, Bie Shengxue, Gu Changchun, Zhang Longjun (Korean), Zhang Mingyuan, Zhang Junxian, Jin Shuoren (Korean), Zhao Jibin, Hao Fuxia, Nan Xiangfu (Korean), Nan Shunji (Korean), Bai Chengqiang, Jiang Chunyun, Fei Anna, Luo Dechun, Yuan Baixiong, Geng Zhaojie, Xu Ruren, Sang Fengwen, Sang Yuechun (Manchu), Huang Baiqu, Cao Heping, Jiao Zhengzhong, Fu Jingyun, Jiao Haikun, Lu Baofeng, Zeng Fanxu, Zeng Xiaozhen, Xie Anshan, Xie Tieli, Pei Fengkui (Korean)		
2003	10th	Yu Li, Wang Tiange, Wang Yunkun, Wang Huawen, Wang Yongchun, Wang Shouchun, Wang Lixiang, Wang Xiulin, Wang Chunlu (female), Wang Jiaqi, Wang Huanyong, Wang Weizhong, Wang Rulin, Lu Zhimin, Shi Ningzhong, Cong Lianbiao (Hui), Gang Zhanbiao, Liu Yang (female), Liu Xianlu, Liu Shuying (female), Mi Fengjun (Hui), Sun Hejuan (female), Li Yikui, Li Shudong, Li Xiulin, Li Shu, Li Shuguo, Li Zhongxi (Korean), Yang Feng (Manchu), Lian Jianshe, Xiao Yuhuai (Hui), Wu Peijun, Wu Boda, Bie Shengxue, He Yong, Xin Qingshan Zhang Longjun (Korean), Zhang Yong, Aruhan (Mongolian), Chen Guofeng (Hui), Wu Lianyuan (Hui), Lin Zhaomu, Zhu Yanfeng, Yue Qingyou, Jin Hua (female, Korean), Jin Bingmin (Korean), Jin Zhenji (Korean), Meng Xiangjie, Zhao Guoguang, Zhao Binghui, Hao Fuxia (female), Nan Shunji (female, Korean), Bai Guangxin, Hong Hu, Zhu Yejing, Zhu Mingshan, Suo Weidong, Li Zhenguo, Gao Guangbin, Guo Zhaotai, Sang Fengwen, Huang Baiqu, Cao Zhiqiang (Manchu), Gong Ling (female), Jiao Haikun, Cai Zhang, Dai Hongsheng .		
2008	11th	Yu Zhenfa, Wang Yunkun, Wang Huawen, Wang Yuzhi (female), Wang Gang, Wang Zhaohua, Wang Jiangbin (female), Wang Min, Wang Hongjun, Che Xiulan (female), Shi Guoxiang (Hui), Lu Zhimin, Shi Ningzhong, Cong Lianbiao (Hui), Liu Chunmei (female), Liu Yongbing, Liu Xijie, Guan Dewei (female), Mi Fengjun (Hui), Jiang Lianhai, An Fengcheng, Sun Guowei, Sun Hongzhi, Sun Hejuan (female), Du Jie (female), Li Longxi (Korean), Li Xiulin, Li Yanqun, Li Fusheng, Yang Yang (female), Yang Yajie, Wu Yue, Bie Shengxue, Song Shanglong, Song Zhiping (female), Zhang Wenxian, Zhang Anshun, Zhang Jinshuo, Zhang Bolin, Zhang Binggong, Zhang Xiaopei, Zhang Xianchong, Chen Mingle (Tibetan), Chen Xiaoguang, Wu Yin (female), Huheshaobu (Mongolian), Zhu Yanfeng, Yue Derong, Jin Bingmin (Korean), Jin Shuoren (Korean), Zhou Qifeng, Zhou Chunlian (female), Zhou Zhenhai, Zhao Bingzhe (Korean), Hao Fuxia (female), Bai Guangxin, Xian Shunnu (female, Korean), Hou Qijun, Hong Hu, Zhu Yejing, Xu Yuanzheng (Manchu), Xu Jianyi, Guo Guoqing, Tang Zhiping (female), Tang Xianqiang, Gong Ling (female), Cui Jinshun (female, Korean), Cui Jie, Han Changfu		
2013	12th	Yu Zhongchi, Wan Lingling (female), Ma Junqing, Wang Yuzhi (female), Wang Min, Wang Guangjun, Wang Liying (female), Wang Songhe, Wang Jiaqi, Wang Changsong, Wang Rulin, Che Guangtie (Korean), Che Xiulan (female), Yin Yanli, Bayanqolu (Mongolian), Shi Guoxiang (Hui), Lu Zhimin, Tian Yulin, Qu Jiuhui, Ren Kejun, Liu Guifeng (female), Liu Yichun, Yan Shaojun, An Guiwu, Sun Lirong (female, Manchu), Sun Guowei, Sun Hejuan (female), Su Jun, Du Qinglin, Li Yuanyuan, Li Xiulin, Li Xiangguo, Li Shuguo Li Yanqun, Li Zhen (female), Li Hui, Li Jinghao (Korean), Yang Yang (female), Yang Keqin, Yang Shaohua, Bie Shengxue, Tong Yi (Manchu), Zou Jihong (female), Song Zhiping (female), Zhang Qiyang, Jin Hua (female, Korean), Jin Yuhui, Jin Shuoren (Korean), Zheng Hengri (Korean), Bao Yintai (Mongolian), Zhao Jingbo, Xun Fengqi, Bai Guangxin, Xiu Fujin, Jiang Zhiying, Hong Changyou (Hui), Nie Wenquan, Xu Jianyi, ~~Gao Fei~~, Guo Naishuo, Tang Xianqiang, Peng Yonglin, Xie Zhongyan, Xiong Mei (female), Pan Yongxing		
2018	13th	Sun Chunlan (female), Zhang Lijun, Yang Zhijin, Zhang Bojun, Jin Hongguang (Korean ethnicity), Liu Yunzhi, Ding Zhaomin, Yu Zhongchi, Wang Zilian, Wang Liping, Wang Tingshuang, Wang Bing (Manchu), Wang Jiangbin (female), Wang Jinxing, Wang Yanfeng (female), Wang Run, Wang Jiaqi, Che Xiulan (female), Bayanqolu (Mongolian), Pu Songlie (Korean), Zhu Guiyan (female), Hua Jinliang, Hua Shucheng, Liu Changlong, Liu Huawen, Liu Liyan (female), Liu Fei, Liu Feng, Liu Yichun, Qi Songyu, An Guiwu, Sun Fengyue, Sun Shuzhen, Li Shengfan (Korean), Li Xiulin, Li Mingwei, Li Caiyun (female), Yang Xiaotian, Yang Keqin, Gu Fengjie (female), Chu Jianmei (female), Zhang Baoyan (female), Shao Zhihao, Lin Wu, Tumen (Mongolian), Jin Shouhao (Korean), Jin Zhenji (Korean), Jin Xiong (Korean), Zheng Qiulin,~~Zhao Longhu (Korean ethnicity)~~Zhao Biao, Xian Shunnv (female, Korean), Qin He (female, Manchu), Qian Wancheng, Xu Yanru (female), Xu Liuping, Gao Guiying (female), Guo Naishuo, Tao Zhiguo, Kou Fang, Han Fuchun, Jing Junhai, Zeng Fantao (Manchu), Xie Zhongyan .		
2023	14th	Ding Zhongli, Ma Xiujuan, Wang Zilian, Wang Lisheng, Wang Ji, Wang Tingshuang, Wang Zhihou, Wang Jinjie, Wang Feng, Wang Xuefeng, Wang Feng, Yin Yijun, Bayanqolu, Yu Mingji, Ye Yongxing, Bai Yujing, Bai Jingyang, Lü Guoyue, Zhu Yabo, Xiang Hui, Jiang Jinquan, An Lijia, Sun Guangzhi, Li Wenhui, Yang Dayong, Yang Xiaotian, Yang Yongxiu, Yang Xiaohui, Zhang Taifan, Zhang Xi, Zhang Xuejun, Chen Xuesi, Chen Qiang, Shao Zhihao, Jin Hongguang, Jin Yanjiang, Zhao Jing, Hu Bin, Xian Shunnu, Hou Yongzhi, Hong Qing, Qin He, Jia Xiaodong, Xu Yanru, Xu Jiaxin, Gao Shan, Gao Guangbin, Huang Hai, Huang Qiang, Han Fengxiang, Han Yongzhe, Jing Junhai, Cheng Yu, Mandula, Cai Dong, Cai Hongxing, Luo Shugang, Tan Tianxing, Hu Yuting	60	
