= Xinjiang delegation to the National People's Congress =

Xinjiang Uygur Autonomous Region Delegation to the National People's Congress
- 全国人民代表大会新疆维吾尔自治区代表团
- Delegation for the National People's Congress
- Map showing the location of the Xinjiang Uygur Autonomous Region
- Electoral unit: Xinjiang Uygur Autonomous Region
- Population: 25,852,345

Current Delegation
- Created: 1954
- Seats: 60
- Head of delegation: Ma Xingrui
- Regional People's Congress: Xinjiang Uygur Autonomous Regional People's Congress

The Xinjiang Uygur Autonomous Region delegation to the National People's Congress is a delegation composed of deputies representing Xinjiang Uygur Autonomous Region in within the National People's Congress (NPC), the supreme organ of state power of the People's Republic of China. NPC deputies from Xinjiang are officially elected by the Xinjiang Uygur Autonomous Region People's Congress.

== List of deputies ==
Year	NPC session	Deputies	Number of deputies	Ref.
1954	1st	Wang Enmao, Yimin Mahesumu, Anniwar Gakulin, Aisihaiti, Lü Jianren, Yiminnov, Patihan Suguerbayev, Abulez Muhammaiti, Ayimujiang, Yuzhanlin, Mernishahan Aini, Mamutiniyaz, Zhang Bangying, Maimaiti Niyazhari, Maimaiti Aisha, Dashafu, Muyiti, Baoerhan, Serima Talifuwa, Saifrayev, Saifuddin Azizi	21	
1959	2nd	Zha Kelov, Yahefu Da Mullah, Simayi Yashengov, Baoerhan, Anniwar Hanbaba, Anniwar Jakulin, Maimaitihawuli, Tursun Aji, Seliman (female), Yimin Mahsumu, Wang Feng, Xin Lanting, Wushuerjiafu, Hederbai, Lü Jianren, Ayimuhan (female), Akmuxirifu, Yuzhanlin, Zulong Hader, Mayinur (female), Saifuddin Azizi	21	
1964	3rd	Wang Yuhu, Wang Binsheng, Wang Heting, Yahefu Damula, Deng Liqun, Badai, Kamiljiang, Tian Zhong, Baoerhan, Simayi Yashengov, Sidike Wushur, Nikolai Vasilivich Zimenko, Xu Hengtong, Tohti Khan Mamuti, Dawuti Shatar, Zaori Abit, Lü Jianren, Irhali, Mahsud, Maimaiti Naimaiti, Maimaiti Hawuli, Maimaitimin Ali, Maidhan Kunapiya, Maistuhan Bawudong, Mayinur, Keyum Niyaz Li Weihan, Li Cuifeng, Wu Shibing, Zhang Zhonghan, Abula Yibulayin, Abdukerim Maimaitili, Abduarang Urazali, Abdureyimu Aji, Ayimhan, Ayimunisha, Ayimhan Tiliwalid, Ayitula, Akmuhejia, Zhuoerhan, Diyar Kumasi, Patanmu Kurban, Rouziwan, Hawan, Hadier, Yuzhanlin, Tang Guohua, Xialifuhan, Temur Dawamat, Tayir Maimaitiali, Huang Hezan, Saifuddin Azizi, Delin	53	
1975	4th	Wang Zhenzhong, Wang Zhendong, Musa Simayi, Yahefu Damula, Kongdekong, Badai, Yusufu Maimaiti, Ailiyashar, Aishan Niyaz, Aini Sidikov, Aizezi Yibulayin, Karpova Nadja, Tian Shuzhen, Baidi Haishan, Yamilihamufuti, Rouzi Nishahan, Zhu Qingjia, Liu Chunfang, Liu Xing, Liu Furong, Maimaiti Rouzi, Maimaiti Kerim, Shouqing, Keyum Maimaiti Niyaz, Li Zhaoming Li Yunhe, Xiao Yuancai, Wu Julun, Wu Xiufang, Kurban Tulum, Kurban Halik, Kuwanhan Maimaiti, Shamalihan, Zhang Jiecheng, Amudong Niyaz, Ayimhan, Amina Aimaiti, Chen Xuedong, Lazik Maimaiti, Hejiabai, Hejia Aihemaiti, Farida, Tuzhi, Rebiya Maimaiti, Temur Dawamat, Xu Xiukuan, Gao Youfu, Taqishan, Fu Heizi, Saifuddin, Mulawarhan Ibrahim	51	
1978	5th	Ma Chengrong, Mahmuti Kurbaniyaz, Wang Yuhu, Wang Yumei, Wang Zhenwen, Wang Binsheng, Musa Simayi, Yahefu Damula, Niujiuwuli Wufuer, Yuernisha Maimaiti, Wenhetu, Badai, Aini Sidikefu, Aizezi Wulayin, Karpova Nadja, Nurhan, Yamiliha, Biken, Rouzinisha Khan Nur, Yilhari, Liu Guilan, Ruan Kaiguo, Maimaitiniyaz Naser, Maimaitituersun Kerim, Maimaiti Rouzi, Maimaiti Silamu, Shouqing, Keyum Maimaitiniyaz, Li Yunhe, Yang Yongqing, Yang Chunlian, Wuhelihan Rouzi, Wushur Axi Mu, Xiao Yuancai, He Bingxian, Kurbanjiang, Wang Feng, Shabir Mamuti, Zhang Suiwang, Amudong Niyaz, Abudukerim Maimaitili, Abudula Tusun, Ayup, Asim Balati, Ayinula Apiz, Ziya, Zinaxi, Chen Shanming, Lazik Maimaiti, Pawa, Yimingnahong Wushier, Hu Bing, Haderhan, Hou Zhengyuan, He Fengjin, Qin Heyi, Rebiya Maimaiti, Reyimujiang, Temur Dawamat, Guo Juying, Huang Dawen, Kangmaier Abudureheman, Tayir Maimaitili, Fu Heizi, Zeng Jifu, Saifuddin, Hojabaimunawarhan Ibrahim	68	
1983	6th	Mamutov Kurban, Ma Zhankui, Wang Yunlong, Wang Enmao, Wang Binsheng, Wang Huiyi, Wang Heting, Yahefu Tulahun, Balati Shawuti, Badai, Aymat Rouzi, Aimorwula, Gularemu, Ye Xiuying, Tian Zhong, Simayi Aymat, Nishahan Yasheng, Manglik Rouzi, Tuerdikexi, Tursun Wursali, Zhu Minggang, Semaitimahesumu, Liu Chunyao, Miziahemaiti, Xu Xiuhua, Sun Guocheng, Maimaitinuer, Xiaochang, Yang Yiqing, Yang Yongqing, Wufu Er Abdulla, Salameti Alim, Zhang Xuezu, Amudong Niyaz, Abdusalam, Abdushukur Turdi, Abuzar, Anarhan Tohti, Zilaihan Yahefu, Chen Shi, Chen Shanming, Lin Zhiren, Diyar Kumash, Patam Balati, Patiman Yimin, Halibek, Hamiti Hudabaierdi, Yu Zhanlin, Rehefu Abbas, Xia Xi, Temur Dawamat, Xu Baihui, Vera, Tajihan, Lian Hui, Saifulaev, Saifuddin	57	
1988	7th	Mamutov Kurban, Ma Chengrong, Ma Jianping, Wang Zhen, Murathoga, Shvalova Nina, Yusup Isa, Aishaiti, Kabila Smahuli, Ye Xiuying, Simayi Aymat, Liu Shuangquan, Mijiti Hudabaierdi, Miz Ahemaiti, Ru Guang, Xu Xiuhua, Xu Peng, Mairanmuhan, Yahefu, Mayinur Hasimu, Keyum Turdi, Keranmu Yiming, Sulaiman, Li Donghui, Li Chongzheng, Li Jiayu, Li Congheng, Wuful Abudula, Wu Jiahe, Hederbai, Zou Ruqing, Kurban Niyaz, Song Hanliang, Zhang Zhengqing, Amudong Niyaz, Abulikemu Ahemaiti, Abudushukur Turdi, Abudurexiti Karaji, Abudureyim Amiti, Aba Baike Shawuti, Abuzhar Helili, Ayimhan Amiselim Albusbai Lahamu, Chen Shanming, Nurmeti Niyaz, Nurmohammet Reisi, Lin Zhiren, Zhuohala Simayili, Rehefu Abbas, Reishan Abuliz, Dang Jin, Temur Dawamat, Xu Baihui, Hairensha Silamu, Huang Baozhang, Jiefuping, Han Pengtu, Xie Shengrui, Saifuddin Aizezi, Xue Huifen	59	
1993	8th	Mamuti Kaderaji, Mahmuti Maimaiti, Ma Jianguo, Wang Yufen, Wang Lequan, Murat Hoja, Yunus Aikermu, Aizzaim Aimat, Aiheti Aman, Aishaiti Aishanni, Aishaiti Kerimbai, Karapova Ivanovna Kaliya, Yongdeguang, Bi Yulan, Tursun Sotai, Rouzi Aiyiti, Mirzai Dusmaimaiti, Mijiti Hudabaierdi, Anniwar Yushan, Xu Peng, Maimaitijiang Aimat, Mayinur Hasimu, Keyum Tuerdi, Kerim Nasirdin, Sultan Zhangbolatov, Wu Chang Yuan, Zou Ruqing, Shadik Kariaji, Song Hanliang, Zhang Guoxiang, Ashanbaike Tuerdi, Amudong Niyaz, Abuduwaiti Wushur, Abudureyim Amiti, Abudureyim Ajiyiming Albusbai Lahamu, Chen Zhaoyu, Chen Shanming, Chen Demin, Nurnisha Wufuer, Zhuohala Simayili, Jin Yunhui, Zhou Zhuhua, Ruxianguli Abudulahades, Rehemudula Aymat, Nie Shengli, Jia Demin, Dang Jin, Temur Dawamat, Xu Siyi, Xu Xiaocheng, Cao Zonghuai, Sheng Huaren, Kang Kejian, Jiang Lingzhi, Xie Shengrui, Dai Mingzi	58	
1998	9th	Malik (Uzbek), Mahmut Maimaiti (Uyghur), Wang Lequan, Wang Chuanyou, Wang Tong, Muhammaiti (Tatar), Washga Liza Lida (Russian), Yin Kesheng, Yusuyin Yusup (Uyghur), Aizzaim Aimaiti (Uyghur), Bruga (Mongolian), Simayi Khatip (Uyghur), Tursunnayi Ibrahimjan (Uyghur), Rouzi Gulibai (Tajik) Zhu Jian (Hui), Yidilis Abuduresul (Uyghur), Liu Chuanzhen, Liu Shouren, Guan Guizhen (Xibe), Xu Peng, Maimaitiming Yasheng (Uyghur), Mayinur Hasimu (Uyghur), Sultan Zhangbolatov (Kazakh), Li Honggui, He Bingxian, Kurbanjan Maimaiti (Uyghur), Shadik Kariaji (Uyghur), Shamarhan Usman (Kazakh), Zhang Ruipu, Ashanbaike Tu Erdi (Kyrgyz), Azati Sulitan (Uyghur), Amudong Niyaz (Uyghur), Abulez Paizula (Uyghur), Ablat Abdureshit (Uyghur), Abdurehman Ali (Uyghur), Abdurehman Keranmu (Uyghur), Adil Wushur (Uyghur), Albusbai Lahamu (Kazakh), Lin Tianxi, Dilana Aishan (Uyghur), Pa Lidan Abudureheman (Uyghur), Palidan Adelhan (Kazakh), Zhou Jianhua (Hui), Zhou Zhuhua, Julaiti Maimaitiming (Uyghur), Zhao Guoyu, Kesaijiang Sailihejia (Kazakh), Hazi Aymat (Uyghur), Zulfiya Abudukader (Uyghur), Yao Yongfeng, Temur Dawamat (Uyghur), Xu Siyi, Gao Jiangong, Guo Minjie, Xie Shengrui, Huo Yi, Dai Mingzi, Qu Wenzhi	59	
2003	10th	Ma Mingcheng (Hui), Wang Lequan, Wang Jinxiang, Wang Xinhuai, Zahan Emar (Kazakh), Mutola Musa (Uyghur), Niu Ruji, Maoken Saiyitihamza (Kazakh), Badai (Mongolian), Ainiwar Yiming (Uyghur), Gulizati Hasanmuhan (female, Kazakh), Shi Dagang, Simayi Aimaiti (Uyghur), Simayi Hatif (Uyghur), Simayi Tiliwaldi (Uyghur), Tursun Yasheng (Uyghur) Rouzi Gulibai (Tajik), Dolikun Ibulain (Uyghur), Liu Shouren, Guan Guizhen (female, Xibe), Maimaitiming Abudureyim (Uyghur), Maimaitiming Mamuti (Uyghur), Maria Mati (female, Kyrgyz), Mayinur Niyaz (female, Uyghur), Li Zhizhong, Yang Zhiguo, Yang Huizhu (female), Wumarjiang Mizi Aihmaiti (Uyghur), Wumar Abula (Uyghur), Wang Jianjun, Zhang Qingli Ablat Abdureshit (Uyghur), Abula Kasim (Uyghur), Abduxikul Mijit (Uyghur), Abdulla Abbas (Tatar), Abdureyim Amiti (Uyghur), Abuliz Maimaitinasir (Uyghur), Aliya Azhamati (female, Uzbek), Aligen Aiheti (Uyghur), Adil Wushur (Uyghur), Ayixianmu Samusak (female, Uyghur), and Layi Sa Aleksandra (female, Russian), Dilinar Abdullah (female, Uyghur), Zhou Huan, Zhao Xia, Zhao Liuan, Ke Li (female, Hui), Kesaijiang Serihega (Kazakh), Zulfiya Abduqadir (female, Uyghur), Li Zhi, Gu Ming (female), Tieliwaldi Abdureshit (Kazakh), Gao Fashui, Gao Tongqing, Tang Jian, Mei Xingrun, Xuekelaiti Zakir (Uyghur), Dong Lianhui, Jiang Qiangui (female), Jing Haiyan (female)	60	
2008	11th	Maning Zainile (Kazakh), Madengfeng (Hui), Wang Lequan, Juaiti Yiming (Uyghur), Niu Ruji, Maoken Saiyitihamza (Kazakh), Ailigeng Yimingbahei (Uyghur), Ainiwar Yiming (Uyghur), Aikber Wufuer (Uyghur), Tian Wen (female), Shi Shaolin, Shi Jianyong (Mongolian), Simayi Tieliwaldi (Uyghur), Jierla Yishamuding (Uyghur), Dilimaolati Yi Bulayin (Tajik), Dalelihan Mamihan (Kazakh), Rouzi Simayi (Uyghur), Ren Jidong, Liu Zhi, Yan Fenxin, Sun Changhua, Maria Mati (female, Kyrgyz), Mayinur Niyaz (female, Uyghur), Li Zhimin (female), Li Xinming, Yang Gang, Yang Qin (female, Hui), Yang Huizhu (female), Shen Yan, Song Dexi, Zhang Handong, Zhang Xin, Abdullah Abbas (Tatar), Abdurehman Yasheng (Uyghur) Abudureyim Amiti (Uyghur), Abudilaziz Maitinasir (Uyghur), Adil Wushur (Uyghur), Amanbay Dawuti (Kazakh), Ashar Tursun (Uyghur), Nur Bekri (Uyghur), Nurla Ayup (Uyghur), Nusraiti Wajidin (Uyghur), Laisa Aleksandra (female, Russian), Dilinar Abudula (female, Uyghur) The following individuals are listed: Zhou Shengtao, Juma Tair (Uyghur), Zhao Xia, Halida Nurmemet (female, Uzbek), Hou Xiaoqin, Zulfiya Abduqadir (female, Uyghur), Yuan Ze, Rena Kasimu (female, Uyghur), Nie Weiguo, Li Zhi, Xiarewana Abdukeyim (female, Uyghur), Cao Peixi, Xuekelaiti Zakir (Uyghur), Sihan Tuludaheng (female, Kazakh), Cheng Zhenshan, and Fu Chunli (female, Xibe)	60	
2013	12th	Naim Yasin (Uyghur), Wang Changshun, Wang Jian, Mutalifu Wubuli (Uyghur), Che Jun, Yasheng Tursun (Uyghur), Bahedanguli Zati (female, Kazakh), Ailigeng Yimingbahe (Uyghur), Aizezi Musa (Uyghur), Aisihaiti Kerimbai (Kazakh), Gulinur Maimaiti (female, Uyghur), Shi Jianyong (Mongolian), Nixiang Yibulayin (Uyghur), Jierla Yi Shamuddin (Uyghur), Liu Zhi, Liu Xinqi, Liu Xinsheng, Qi Baowen, Nabulasha Hujiahong (Tajik), Maimaitiming Yasheng (Uyghur), Maimaitiyibreyim Maimaitiming (Uyghur), Mardan Mugaiti (Uyghur), Mayinur Niyaz (female, Uyghur), Sulitan Jiayinak (Kyrgyz), Li Xuejun, Li Jianguo, Yang Qin (female, Hui), Wushur Silamu (Uyghur), Lina (female, Russian) (Russian), He Huixing, Sharhat Ahan (Kazakh), Shen Yan, Zhang Chunxian, Abdulla Abbas (Tatar), Abdurekhp Tumniyaz (Uyghur), Adil Wushur (Uyghur), Nur Bekri (Uyghur), Wu Gang, Dilinar Abdulla (female, Uyghur), Zhou ~~Xinyuan~~, Zhao Qing, Halidan Abduqadir (female, Uyghur), Hasyeti Ali (female, Uyghur), Qin Zhong, Re Hanguli Yimir (female, Uyghur), Reziwanguli Jamal (female, Uyghur), Reziguli Kulahun (female, Uyghur), Guo Lianshan, Xi Wenhai (Hui), Tang Shisheng, Huang Wei, Huang Rong, Xuekelaiti Zakir (Uyghur), Talihati Wusun (Kazakh), Sirjiang Tohtimurat (Kazakh), Dong Xinguang, Zeng Cun, Fu Chunli (female, Xibe), Fu Puyan, Muhtabai Shadiq (female, Uzbek)	60	
2018	13th	Chen Quanguo, Ailigeng Yimingbahe (Uyghur), Shi Dagang, Liu Haixing, Li Wei, He Xingliang, Wang Gang (Armed Police), Wang Gang (Karamay), Wang Yanqing (female), You Liangying (female), Zhu Hailun,Liu Baozeng, Sun Jinlong, Sun Chunwang, Zhang Yan (female), Zhang Xin, Chen Liang, Luo Dongchuan, Zhou Xuyong, Zhao Jinlong, Xu Tao, Cui Jiuxiu (female), Liao Chaoyang, Naim Yasin (Uyghur), Musa Maimaiti (Uyghur), Musajan Nurdun (Uyghur), Yasin Sidike (Uyghur)~~Aikber Metinasir (Uyghur)~~Niyaz Asim (Uyghur), Miklay Ibrahim (female, Uyghur), Rukyam Metisaidi (female, Uyghur), Maimaitiming Kade (Uyghur), Maimaitiming Abuduaini (Uyghur), Maimaiti Juma (Uyghur), Wurnisha Kader (female, Uyghur), Shohrat Imin (Uyghur), Kurban Niyaz (Uyghur), Abudurekefu Tumunniyaz (Uyghur), Adalati Aizaiz (female, Uyghur), Adi Li Abudurezak (Uyghur), Nur Memet (Uyghur), Parhati Rouzi (Uyghur), Kaiser Abudukerem (Uyghur), Zumreti Wubuli (female, Uyghur), Xuekelaiti Zakir (Uyghur), Muheyati Garmuhamati (Kazakh), Yerjan Juanhan (Kazakh), Kurmash Sirjan (Kazakh), Hanibati Shabukai (Kazakh), Reyizha Bahedaoleti (female, Kazakh), Li Bin (Hui).~~Zhang Chengyi (Hui nationality)~~Dilixati Kederhan (Kyrgyz), Purba Tugjegafu (Mongolian), Lazini Bayika (Tajik), Guo Xiaohong (female, Xibe), Fatima (female, Uzbek), Min Xiaoqing (female, Russian), Jiaerheng Ahati (Tatar), Ma Xuejun (Dongxiang).	61	
2023	14th	Ma Yanan, Mahmuti Wumarjiang, Ma Xingrui, Wang Mingshan, Wang Kuiran, Wang Chao, Musa Maimaiti, Musajiang Hailat, Batu, Kong Feifei, Yumerjiang Kurban, Erken Tuniyaz, Ainiwar Tursun, Aikerem Maimaitiming, Gulimila Dawuleti, Shigang, Yershat Tursunbai, Tian Xiangli, Xing Guangcheng, Dilixiati Parhati, Dilimulati Aisimutula, Zainure Talihati, Zhu Guanglan, Doratiman Kaimike, Liu Hongtao, Minawa Aibibula, Rukeyam Maitisaidi, Maimaitiming Kade Maimaiti Juma, Li Lan, Li Yunfei, Li Xianfa, Yang Liqiang, Wulamujiang Reyim, Xiao Keti Yiming, Wu Wenxiu, Kurban Niyaz, Min Xiaoqing, Sharhat Ahan, Zhang Xin, Abdimaimaiti Abuli, Aji Aikebaier Aisa, Aydin Toliuhan, Chen Weijun, Zoya Bakhti, Dilxati Sayim, Jin Zhizhen, Zheng Jun, Zheng Yufeng, Julaiti Kurban, Meng Nan, Hanengbi Aisa, Pang Zijian, Zumurati Wubuli, Nuerbuya Siyiti, Gao Jiming, Guo Hongquan, Shohrat Zakir, Xue Bin, Chen Xiaojiang	60	
