= Jiangxi delegation to the National People's Congress =

Jiangxi Delegation to the National People's Congress
- 全国人民代表大会江西省代表团
- Delegation for the National People's Congress
- Map showing the location of Jiangxi Province
- Electoral unit: Jiangxi Province
- Population: 45,188,635

Current Delegation
- Created: 1954
- Seats: 81
- Head of delegation: Yin Hong
- Provincial People's Congress: Jiangxi Provincial People's Congress

The Jiangxi delegation to the National People's Congress is a delegation composed of deputies representing Jiangxi Province within the National People's Congress (NPC), the supreme organ of state power of the People's Republic of China. NPC deputies from the Jiangxi Province are officially elected by the Jiangxi Provincial People's Congress.

== List of deputies ==
Year	NPC sessions	Deputies	Number of deputies	Ref.
1954	1st	Wei Xiuying, Zhu Xianfang, Wu Youxun, Li Youxiu, Yi Ruisheng, Shao Shiping, Yao Yilin, Xu Deheng, Guo Qingsi, Chen Shaoxian, Chen Qihan, Chen Yike, Cheng Xiaogang, Huang Jiasi, Yang Weiyi, Zhao Chenggu, Liu Zhigang, Liu Junxiu, Liu Jianhua, Pan Zhenya, Luo Longji		
1959	2nd	Bai Dongcai, Liu Zhigang, Liu Jianhua, Liu Junxiu, Wei Xiuying (female), Li Youxiu (female), Chen Shaoxian, Chen Yike, Wu Youxun, Wu Xuezhou, Zhang Shiying, Shao Shiping, Yi Ruisheng, Ma Tingshi, Xu Deheng, Guo Qingfen, Guo Qingsi, Huang Jiasi, Cheng Xiaogang, Yang Weiyi, Pan Zhenya		
1964	3rd	Ding Changhua, Wan Shangyin, Wan Quansheng, Deng Diaantao, Feng Kang, Gan Zuchang, Bai Dongcai, Jiang Shanjiang, Liu Zhigang, Liu Caikun, Liu Jianhua, Liu Junxiu, Liu Yin, Xu Deheng, Sun Shanlun, Wang Dongxing, Song Liancheng, Li Youxiu, Li Shizhang, Li Zhu, Yang Shaonan, Yang Weiyi, Kuang Fuzhao, Wu Youxun, Wu Rongfeng, He Shikun, Zhang Shiying, Chen Zhengren, Chen Shaoxian, Chen Taohu, Chen Yike, Shao Shi Ping, Yi Ruisheng, Zhou Zhifang, Meng Xianjin, Shi Zuoyu, Shi Zhen, Zhao Changsheng, Zhong Yi, Rao Mengkan, Gao Lingyun, Guo Qingfen, Guo Qingsi, Yuan Lin, Qian Renyuan, Xu Yongying, Kang Keqing, Cao Cunchang, Fu Shigui, Xie Guangdao, Peng Di, Huang Huoxing, Huang Qiwang, Huang Zhizhen, Huang Jiasi, Cheng Xiaogang, Lu Zhijun, Cai Ruohong, Cai Sui'ang, Pan Shiyan, Pan Zhenya, Dai Liangchai, Qu Lanxiang		
1975	4th	Wan Longhai, Wan Lilang, Wang Dachuan, Wang Genquan, Wang Xuanchun, Gan Zuchang, Gu Changgang, Zhu Jufang, Xiang Layu, Liu Junxiu, Jiang Weiqing, Li Youxiu, Li Jinfang, Li Wenju, Li Douwu, Li Shizhang, Li Chongxin, Yang Shangkui, Yang Chunfa, Wu Honggen, Wu Jiaolian, She Jide, Shen Shujin, Song Zhilin, Zhang Yongfu, Zhang Yongxin, Zhang Zhihong, Zhang Shenghua, Lu Xiaopeng, Chen Changgen, Chen Changfeng, Chen Junu, Zhao Zhijian, Hu Jinsheng, Hu Chongpei, Qin Yuxiang, Xia Puxiang, Xu Dafang, Xu Qingxiu, Gao Fengxian, Tao Zhimou, Zhang Shimei, Zhang Shuiying, Peng Xuefu, Cheng Xiangming, Fu Zuoxiang, Zeng Fangui, Zeng Guohua, Zeng Zhenrong, Lei Ximei, Cai Fanggen, Liao Wenming, Tan Dongyou, Xiong Xuequn, Li Shoutian, Pan Shiyan, Pan Zhenya, Xue Yingzhao, Wei Jinhe		
1978	5th	Wan Lilang, Wan Zhaoxiang, Wang Shousong, Wang Shixian, Wang Genquan, Fang Zhichun, Fang Saizhi, Deng Wugen, Deng Diantao, Gan Zuchang, Tian Shiyi, Zhu Fengjin, Xiang Layu, Liu Damei, Liu Zhenglin, Liu Yangying, Liu Junxiu, Liu Yin, Jiang Shanjiang, Jiang Weiqing, Xu Qin, Su Yuandong, Li Youxiu, Li Jinfang, Li Shizhang, Li Wuyu, Li Zhiming, Li Zhu, Li Chongxin, Li Yizhang, Yang Shangkui, Yang Chunfa, Yang Xianggen, Xiao Meiqi, Wu Yuanxian, Wu Yongle, Wu Caiyuan, Wu Chuntai, Yu Qiuli, Shen Huacai, Shen Shujin, Zhang Changsheng Zhang Yongxin, Zhang Shenghua, Lu Xiaopeng, Chen Changgen, Hang Shirong, Luo Riyun, Zhou Keyong, Zhou Guihua, Zhao Fasheng, Hu Jinsheng, Hu Xianke, Hu Delan, Zhong Fuming, Qin Hanzhang, Yuan Ruisheng, Nie Musheng, Mo Xun, Gui Xiangfeng, Xu Qingxiu, Guo Yamin, Guo Zongyi, Tang Baosheng, Tao Zhimou, Huang Lugu, Fu Shigui, Fu Da, Kang Keqing, Zhang Shimei, Zhang Wenchao, Liang Jianguo, Peng Xuefu, Peng Mengyu, Cheng Xiangming, Zeng Zhi, Zeng Zhenrong, Lei Ximei, Xiong Xuequn, Li Shoutian, Yan Longan, Pan Wenwei, Pan Shiyan, Pan Zhenya		
1983	6th	Yu Zuyue, Wan Shaofen, Wan Shaohe, Ma Jikong, Wang Wencai, Wang Facai, Wang Ze, Wang Shixian, Wei Fankun, Deng Zihua, Ye Fayou, Tian Shiyi, Lü Juxiang, Zhu Fengjin, Xiang Layu, Liu Tianquan, Liu Wei, Liu Huasheng, Liu Yunlai, Jiang Dajie, Xu Qin, Sun Tianxin, Mou Jikuan, Li Yisu, Li Tianpei, Li Qishan, Li Guoping, Li Zhu, Li Hongding, Yang Fanghua, Wu Yongle, Shen Shujin, Zhang Ben, Zhang Bingbin, Zhang Xiuxi, Zhang Fengyu, Zhang Haifeng, Zhang Meina, Lu Xiaopeng, Lu Zongwei, Chen Kaiying, Chen Guanzhen, Lin Fang Zhi, Ouyang Henggui, Luo Riyun, Luo Xudong, Jin Liqiang, Jing Zilin, Zhao Zengyi, Hu Zhengye, Hu Hongting, Hu Xianke, Hu Yanling, Liu Bin, Zhong Jingen (She ethnic group), He Shimin, Qin Hanzhang, Gu Yulin, Xu Jingfa, Xu Hailian, Gao Pikai, Guo Jibing, Guo Shiyong, Tu Xiaoping, Huang Maoheng, Cao Shaoqiong, Fu Shigui, Fu Da, Kang Keqing, Zhang Lianying, Zeng Qinghe, Zeng Zhaokan, Zeng Xianbin, Qiu Zongshun, Lai Lunjun, Cai Guanlin, Cai Ruohong, Cai Dianhua, Xiong Xuequn, Li Shoutian, Yan Longan, Pan Wenwei, Dai Chongan		
1988	7th	Wan Xianhao, Wan Shaofen, Wang Shufeng, Wang Zhongfa, Wang Zemin, Wang Houde, Wang Daorui, Wen Xiaoping, Fang Weihai, Fang Bolin, Deng Gaoling, Tian Shiyi, Bi Zhaohua, Lü Peijian, Lü Juxiang, Zhu Rong, Wei Xiuying, Liu Wei, Liu Yandong, Liu Yunlai, Liu Guoxian, Liu Yanling, Liu Xiashi, Liu Huanhui, Xu Qin, Li Yisu, Li Tianpei, Li Qishan, Li Lingling, Li Zhu, Li Chongyou, Li Honghui, Yang Xilin, Xiao Xiuqiong, Wu Guangtuan, Wu Guanzheng, Zou Shuo'en, Zhang Yunchuan, Zhang Shaobo, Zhang Guoxi, Zhang Fu, Zhang Yu Heng, Zhang Ruixue, Lu Xiaopeng, Chen Shixu, Chen Xian, Chen Guanzhen, Chen Zuolin, Chen Fengcai, Luo Ming, Zhou Jiugeng, Zhou Yiping, Zhao Yunzhang, Hu Lihua, Zhong Jingen, Qin Xilin, Xu Youxiang, Xu Jingfa, Xu Zhangying, Guo Yongkun, Tao Yulan, Huang Wenli, Huang Dingyuan, Huang Jianhua, Huang Huang, Huang Maoheng, Cao Jinshui, Cao Shaoqiong, Kang Fangfen, Jiang Zhuping, Cheng Andong, Cheng Jinfa, Shu Shengyou, Shu Huiguo, Zeng Qinghe, Zeng Ronggou, Zeng Zhaokan, Wen Gangbai, Qiu Zongshun, Lei Changsheng, Liao Yunlong, Yan Longan, Dai Chongan		
1993	8th	Wang Shuichang, Wang Shijun, Wang Xingbao, Wang Zhaorong, Wang Zhanyi, Mao Zhiyong, Fang Bolin, Deng Buren, Lu Derong, Ye Rumei, Zhu Zhihong, Wu Xianshuo, Hua Tong, Quan Wenfu, Liu Yuzhong, Liu Chuxun, Liu Yanling, Liu Xiashi, Liu Huanhui, Liu Dewang, Jiang Xiaoying, Xu Qin, Sun Yuping, Sun Jiabiao, Li Xiaoping, Li Lide, Li Peiyao, Li Chongyou, Yang Chunpu, Xiao Shan, Wu Yunjin, Wu Guomin, Wu Guanzheng, Qiu Luxin, He Guangfen, Yu Qiuli, Yu Xiuyan, Ying Mingsheng, Shen Zuxiang, Zhang Guoxi, Zhang Fengyu, Zhang Hai Ru, Zhang Fu, Chen Shixu, Chen Chengzhi, Chen Zuolin, Chen Jizun, Chen Xiangdi, Chen Meifang, Luo Ming, Zhou Qi, Hu Lihua, Hu Chihai, Qin Xilin, Nie Fuzhen, Gu Linfang, Ni Xianwu, Xu Guowu, Xu Jingfa, Yin Guoguang, Guo Yongkun, Tu Linghui, Huang Tianzong, Huang Liqi, Huang Dingyuan, Huang Zhiquan, Huang Yubao, Huang Maoheng, Cao Guanghong, Qi Shanhong, Cui Naifu, Yan Xinyuan, Jiang Zhongping, Yu Changlin, Cheng Guangru, Fu Guoxiang, Shu Shengyou, Zeng Qinghong, Zeng Ronggou, Lei Changsheng, Li Jinhui, Yan Longan, Dai Zhizhong		
1998	9th	Yu Guo, Wang Shijun, Wang Jian, Wang Mingshan, Wang Yumen, Li Zhicheng, Lu Xiuzhen, Ye Rumei, Lan Yuzhao (She ethnic group), Zhu Youlin, Zhu Zhangcai, Zhu Yuli, Zhu Luqi, Wu Ziyao, Wu Xianshuo, Wei Chaoan, Liu Weiping, Liu Yuanchang, Liu Yanling, Liu Yibai, Liu Zhengmin, Liu Xiashi, Jiang Xiaoying, Xu Jinlai (Gaoshan ethnic group), Xu Yanlian, Yan Zhijun, Li Xiaoping, Li Qingyun, Yang Jianxing, Yang Jian, Xiao Yi, Wu Minghui, Yu Pinhua, Yu Xiuyan, Yu Dingge, Song Jun, Zhang Huiheng, Zhang Yuheng, Chen Shi Xu, Chen Daheng, Chen Chengzhi, Chen Li, Chen Guizun, Luo Ming, Zhou Shaosen, Zhou Qunzhu, Zheng Liuying, Hu Zhenpeng, Hu Shuhua, Liu Bin, Zhong Balian, Zhong Qihuang, Jiang Liang, Gong Zheng, Ni Xianwu, Xu Junru, Xu Xiaoquan, Xu Xinming, Gao Yunjia, Tu Xuzhen, Huang Tianzong, Huang Zhiquan, Mei Meihua, Cao Erli, Cao Luosheng, Qi Shanhong, Cui Naifu, Cui Yangsheng, Peng Hongsong, Shu Shengyou, Shu Xiaoqin, Shu Huiguo, Zeng Qinghong, Wen Xinhua, Lei Jiwen (She ethnic group), Yu Zhongyi, Yong Zhongcheng, Yan Longan		
2003	10th	Ding Xinfa, Yu Guo, Wan Xuewen, Ma Zhiwu (Hui nationality), Wang Zhaoyou, Kuang Xiaoping, Zhu Youlin, Zhu Yuli, Ren Jie (female), Liu Sanqiu (female), Liu Yanqiong (female), Liu Haoyuan, Jiang Xiangmei (female), Tang Jianren, Xu Suhui (female), Xu Aimin, Sun Gongsheng, Sun Yonghe, Sun Xiaoshan, Sun Jusheng, Yan Jinliang, Du Wenru, Li Zhong, Li Yuying (female), Li Yaping (female), Li Qingyun, Li Douluo, Li Guohua, Li Guoqiang, Yang Jinhuai, Wu Mugen, Wu Xinxiong, Qiu Eguo, Yu Xiaoping, Song Chenguang, Zhang Zhijian, Zhang Jintao, Chen Daheng, Chen Niandai, Chen Li Ming (female), Chen Li (female), Shao Yepeng, Yi Jinglin, Luo Xiaoyu (female), Jin Xi'an, Zhou Lizhen (female), Meng Jianzhu, Hu Changlin, Hu Dan (female), Hu Youtao, Hu Xian, Liu Bin, Zhong Jiyue, Zhong Jiaming, Hong Lihe, Qin Xilin, Mo Jiawen, Xu Rihui, Xu Shaofang, Gao Yunjia, Guo Minjie, Huang Daifang, Huang Zhiquan, Cui Yangsheng, Yan Xinyuan, Jie Guoxiong, Peng Hongsong, Peng Qiyou, Jiang Fengchi, Cheng Shuifeng (female), Fu Boyan, Fu Qionghua (female), Jiao Ran, Zeng Qinghong, Pu Rixin, Lai Lianming, Yu Zhongyi, Xiong Shengwen, Pan Yiyang, Xue Jiangwu (female)		
2008	11th	Yu Guo, Wan Kai, Ma Yanbo, Wang Ping, Wang Xiankui, Wang Xiaofeng, Wang Hai, Wang Ping (female), Wang Yi, Mao Rifeng, Fang Zhiyuan, Yin Chengjie, Kong Dan, Gan Liangmiao, Long Hong (female), Long Guoying (female), Lan Nianying (female, She ethnic group), Lü Bin, Zhu Youlin, Liu Sanqiu (female), Liu Lizu, Liu Heping, Liu Yanqiong (female), Liu Jifu, Jiang Xiangmei (female), Sun Xiaoshan, Sun Jusheng, Su Rong, Li Yuying (female), Li Li, Li Fang, Li Yihuang, Xiao Yi, Wu Fanghui, Wu Xinxiong, He Hongcheng, Wang Guangtao, Zhang Zhonghou, Zhang Jintao, Zhang Dinglong (Hui ethnic group), Zhang Yong Lu Yonglan (female), Chen Liguo, Chen Daheng, Chen Niandai, Chen Zhisheng, Chen Chunping (female), Yi Jinglin, Zhou Meng, Meng Jianzhu, Zhao Zhiyong, Hu Youtao, Hu Xian, Hu Zhenpeng, Zhong Hongguang, Yao Mugen, Xu Jinpeng, Xu Guifen (female), Ling Chengxing, Gao Xiaoqiong, Tu Qinhua, Huang Guizhang, Huang Zhiquan, Gong Jianhua, Peng Hongsong, Dong Xiansheng, Jing Yidan (female), Jiang Ruming, Fu Qionghua (female), Zeng Yejiu, Zeng Qinghong (female), Xie Mulan (female), Lei Yuanjiang, Yu Guoqing, Jian Qin, Cai Xiaoming, Liao Jinqiu, Liao Liping (female), Pan Yiyang, Wei Xuanjun (female)		
2013	12th	Ma Zhiwu (Hui), Wang Yuncai, Wang Yi, Deng Hui, Gan Liangmiao, Long Hong (female), Long Guoying (female), Long Bozhou, Lu Jinsheng, Lan Nianying (female, She), Liu Sanqiu (female), Liu Shuisheng, ~~Liu Changlin~~, Liu Tieliu, Liu Jie, Jiang Xiangmei (female), Sun Xiaoshan, Yan Chunhua, ~~Su~~ Rong, Li Li, Li Chunyan (female), Li Baomin, Yang Huizhi (female), Xiao Liping, Wu Ying (female), Qiu Xinhai, He Jianyang, He Bingqin, Yu Feng, Yu Mei (female), Leng Xinsheng, Zhang Zhonghou, Zhang Heping, Zhang Jintao, Zhang Dinglong (Hui), Lu Yonglan (female), ~~Chen Weimin~~, Chen Shichun, Chen Liguo Chen Daheng, ~~Chen Anzhong~~, Chen Zhisheng, Chen Junqing, Chen Kangping, Lin Yinsun, Shang Yong, Ming Jinghua (female), Luo Shenglian, Zhou Wenbin, Zhou ~~Junjun~~, Zhou Yi, Zheng Wei, Zhao Baige (female), Hu Shizhong, Hu Zhenpeng, Hu Meiying (female), Hu Shuping (female), Hu Qiang, Zhong Zhisheng, Zhong Chongwu, Hou Yuwen (female), Hong Lihe, Qin Hongsan, Gui Qianjin (female), Ni Baixiang, Xu Guifen (female), Xu Yi, Yin Meigen, Ling Chengxing, Tang Xiao, Huang Changlin, Huang Daifang, Mei Guoping, Lu Xinshe, Yan Gangjun, Jiang Bin, Yu Chunmei (female), Fu Qionghua (female), Yu Guoqing, Cai Hongbin, Pan Dongjun		
2018	13th	Yu Xiuming, Yu Jinyi, Yu Jihua, ~~Ma Yejiang (Manchu)~~, Ma Zhiwu (Hui nationality), Wang Shaoxuan, Wang Shuiping, Wang Aihe, Zhi Yueying (female), Mao Weiming, Kong Falong, Zuo Xiangyun, Lu Tianxi, Ye Rensun, Tian Yunpeng, ~~Shi Wenqing (Mongolian ethnicity)~~, Feng Fan (female), Lan Nianying (female, She ethnic group), Ning Gang, Zhu Hong, Wu Chengxiang (female), Liu Guangping (female), Liu Qi, Liu Jinjie, Liu Jianyang, Liu Depei, Xu Xiaoying (female), Xu Rui, Sun Xinyang, Li Jianghe, Li Xiuxiang (female), Li Hongliang, Yang Guiping, Xiao Liping, Yu Mei (female), Zhang Xiaoping, Zhang Wei (female), Zhang Guoxin, Zhang Jintao, Zhang Hongxing, Zhang Jingjing (female), Zhang Jinghui, Zhang Zhifu, Chen Kangping, Chen Longmei (female), Chen Ganfei, Lin Yinsun, Lin Binyang, Luo Xiaoyun, Luo Laichang, Luo Shenglian, Zhou Meng, Zhou Xinmin, Zheng Hao, Hu Keming, Hu Meiying (female), Hu Qiang, Xin Chunying (female), Yuan Zhenghai, Li Zhanshu, Xia Wenyong, Guo Dawen, ~~Guo An~~, Huang Wensheng, Huang Libo (female), Huang Juhua (female), Huang Lusheng, Mei Yi (female), Lu Xinshe, Ge Xiaoyan (female), Dong Xiaojian, Yu Chunmei (female), Zeng Wenming, Wen Fei, Xie Laifa, Xie Jianhui, Lei Yanqin (female, She ethnic group), Cai Xichun (female), Xiong Jianming, Wei Houkai, Wei Hongyi		
2023	14th	Ding Shunsheng, Yu Jihua, Wan Guangming, Ma Senshu, Wang Anwei, Wang Huaping, Fang Xiangjun, Yin Hong, Yin Zhong, Deng Hui, Zuo Xiangyun, Shi Yu, Ye Jianchun, Le Wenhong, Feng Fan, Zhu Bin, Wu Yingfang, Ren Zhufeng, Wu Chengxiang, Liu Qi, Liu Shuo, Liu Hui, Liu Qiang, Liu Wenfeng, Liu Wenbin, Liu Xiaoqing, Qi Tao, Tang Lixin, Sun Xianzong, Sun Jusheng, Yan Yun, Li Shulei, Li Kejian, Li Liangbin, Xiao Yuwen, Qiu Xiangjun, Qiu Lianchang, He Xiongbin, Min Wei Dong, Song Fulong, Song Dexiong, Zhang Wei, Zhang Qiang, Zhang Hairong, Zhang Jingjing, Chen Yeguang, Luo Wenjiang, Luo Laichang, Luo Sihai, Zhou Xuewen, Zheng Wei, Zheng Haijin, Zong Qiang, Hu Xiaoqing, Hu Xuemei, Zhong Min, Yuan Jian, Xu Lanbin, Xu Yanbin, Xu Yubo, Xu Shixiao, Gao Shiwen, Guo Sufang, Guo Zhenhua, Huang Daifang, Mei Yi, Peng Cong, Jiang Wending, Cheng Lifen, Fu Xinping, Shi Yangli, Wen Fei, Wen Shanlian, Xie Deqiang, Lei Yanqin, Tan Xinping, Xiong Jianming, Xiong Xiaomei	81	
