= Ningxia delegation to the National People's Congress =

Ningxia Hui Autonomous Region Delegation to the National People's Congress
- 全国人民代表大会宁夏回族自治区代表团
- Delegation for the National People's Congress
- Map showing the location of the Ningxia Hui Autonomous Region
- Electoral unit: Ningxia Hui Autonomous Region
- Population: 7,202,654

Current Delegation
- Created: 1954
- Seats: 23
- Head of delegation: Liang Yanshun
- Regional People's Congress: Ningxia Hui Autonomous Region People's Congress
- Created from: Gansu delegation

The Ningxia Hui Autonomous Region delegation to the National People's Congress is a delegation composed of deputies representing the Ningxia Hui Autonomous Region in within the National People's Congress (NPC), the highest organ of state power of the People's Republic of China. NPC deputies from Ningxia are officially elected by the Ningxia Hui Autonomous Region People's Congress.

== List of deputies ==
Year	NPC session	Deputies	Number of deputies	Ref.
1954	1st	Part of the Gansu delegation		
1959	2nd	Liu Geping, Li Jinglin, Ma Yuhuai, Ma Tengai, Lei Qilin	5	
1964	3rd	Ma Yuru, Ma Yuhuai, Ma Shoutao, Ma Sizhong, Ma Tengai, Feng Mao, Mai Shutong, Li Mingsheng, Li Jinglin, Yang Shenggui, Yang Xiurong, Yang Jingren, Yao Yizhuang, Xia Siping, Lei Qilin	15	
1975	4th	Ma Huimin, Wang Hanjie, Wang Quanmao, Wang Weigui, Wang Yaohua, Li Chengyou, Zhang Kehua, Zhang Xuegui, Chen Yangshan, Gao Shengxiang, Kang Jianmin, Siqin, Lei Qilin	13	
1978	5th	Ma Tinggui, Ma Shoushan, Ma Liesun, Wang Guoyi, Wang Yaohua, Li Fu, Yang Jingren, Chen Zhien, Chen Yangshan, Zhou Yin, Zhao Zhongxiu, Qin Fengxian, Yuan Jiaqin, Jia Chuangye, Guo Fenglan, Yinhua, Huo Shilian, Wei Tingxiang	18	
1983	6th	Ma Qingnian, Ma Liesun, Ma Fukang, Feng Mao, Lü Shuying, Yan Jitong, Li Wenbin, Yang Weizhi, Zhang Jie, Chen Yushu, Zhao Zhongxiu, Yu Shiying, Hong Meixiang, Hai Baoren, Liang Feibiao, Hei Boli, Fu Yumei	17	
1988	7th	Ma Li, Ma Zhihua, Ma Zhao, Ma Tengai, Ye Huifen, Bai Lichen, Feng Zhijun, Na Changqi, Di Xiulan, Hu Zicheng, Liang Feibiao	11	
1993	8th	Ma Zifu, Ma Changyi, Ma Sizhong, Wang Zhijie, Bai Lichen, Feng Zhijun, Liu Pu, Li Guihua, He Shengzao, Wang Yu, Zhang Kui, Yao Minxue, Qian Qichen, Han Youwei	14	
1998	9th	Ma Wanlin (Hui), Ma Qizhi (Hui), Ma Changyi (Hui), Ma Jinhu (Hui), Ma Guifen (Uyghur), Ma Ruiwen (Hui), Mao Rubai, Feng Zhijun (Hui), Zhu Zhenlin, Yang Shenglin (Hui), Yang Yongshan (Hui), Zhang Xiaosu, Hu Qinghe, Qian Qichen, Xu Gui, Gao Yongnian, Han Youwei (Hui), Qiu Zhixin	18	
2003	10th	Ding Xiaolian (female, Hui), Ma Qizhi (Hui), Ma Changyi (Hui), Ma Jinhu (Hui), Wang Youde (Hui), Wang Wei (Hui), Feng Zhijun (Hui), Liu Xuejun, Qi Tongsheng, Yang Guolin (Hui), Wu Haiying (female, Hui), He Shaoling (female), He Xueqing, Zhang Buwang, Chen Jianguo, Yuan Hanmin, Tao Yuan, Sheng Huaren, Han Xinmin	19	
2008	11th	Ma Qizhi (Hui), Ma Changyi (Hui), Ma Ruiwen (Hui), Wang Zhengwei (Hui), Wang Qingxi, Wang Heshan, Wang Rugui (Hui), Bai Shangcheng (Hui ), Lü Xinping (female), Wu Yucai (Hui), Wu Haiying (female, Hui), Wang Shucheng, Zhang Zuoli, Chen Ximing (female), Chen Changzhi, Chen Jianguo, Yuan Jinlin, Xu Liqun, Cao Jianguo	19	
2013	12th	Ma Li (Hui), Ma Sangang (Hui), Ma Yuhua (female, Hui), Ma Hancheng (Hui), Ma Ruiwen (Hui), Wang Zhengwei (Hui), Wang Yongyao, Wang Qingxi, Wang Heshan, Bai Shangcheng (Hui), Liu Hui (female, Hui), Wu Shimin, Zhang Bawu, Zhang Xianrui (female), Zhang Yi, Chen Changzhi, Chen Jianguo, Luo Chuntao (female), Xu Liqun, Yong Ruisheng, Cai Wanyuan	21	
2018	13th	Wan Xinheng, Ma Yushan, Ma Hancheng (Hui), Ma Hengyan (female, Hui), Ma Huijuan (female, Hui), Wang Dongxin, Fang Min (female, Manchu), Shi Taifeng, Xu Ning, Xu Chuanzhi, Li Yuhua, Li Rui (Hui), Yang Yujing (Hui), Wu Yucai (Hui), Chen Zhu, Chen Chunping, Shao Junjie, Jin Rubin (Hui), Xian Hui (female, Hui), Xi Qingjiang (Hui), Pan Feng (Hui).	21	
2023	14th	Ma Li, Ma Honghai, Ma Huijuan, Wang Wei, Wang Xuejun, Ai Juntao, Bai Shangcheng, Liu Zhongjun, Liu Jinguo, Sun Zhi, Mai Yanzhou, Li Dongmei, Li Yifei, Li Yuhua, Li Baoping, Yang Qinglong, Zhang Shirong, Zhang Yupu, Zhang Shengli, Chen Chunping, Chen Yan, Zhan Wenlong, Xue Chao	23	
