= Congress System (disambiguation) =

Congress System may refer to:

- Congress System, a political system in 19th century Europe
- Congress System (India), a description of the politics of India while dominated by the Indian National Congress
- Congressional system, a form of government
- People's congress system, the form of government of the People's Republic of China
