= Xu Ruixia =

Chinese politician and jurist (born 1968)

- 徐睿霞

Member of the National Committee of the Chinese People's Political Consultative Conference

14th National Committee
- Incumbent
- Assumed office 4 March 2023

13th National Committee
- In office 3 March 2018 – 4 March 2023

Member of the National People's Congress for Inner Mongolia

11th Congress
- In office 2008–2013

10th Congress
- In office 2003–2008

Personal details
- Born: January 1968 (age 58) Wuyuan County, Inner Mongolia, China
- Other political affiliations: All-China Women's Federation; Non-partisan
- Education: China University of Political Science and Law
- Profession: Attorney

Xu Ruixia (Chinese: 徐睿霞; pinyin: Xú Ruìxiá; born 1968) is a Chinese politician and jurist. Xu was born in January 1968 in Wuyuan County, Inner Mongolia. She obtained a master's in law in 1990 and a doctorate in law in 2002 from the China University of Political Science and Law. After obtaining her master's degree, she worked for the municipal court of Linhe District, Inner Mongolia, China, and served as a prosecutor there from 2000 to 2003. From 2003 to 2017, Xu served in administrative roles and as a jurist in Inner Mongolia. In 2017, she was named deputy mayor of Hohhot. She was appointed Deputy Director of the Department of Human Resources and Social Security of Inner Mongolia in 2021.

At the national level, Xu was elected as a delegate to the 10th and 11th National People's Congresses from Inner Mongolia, serving from 2003 to 2013. From 2018 to 2023, she was a member of the 13th National Committee of the Chinese People's Political Consultative Conference and since 2023 she has been a member of the 14th National Committee as a delegate of the All-China Women's Federation.
