= People's congress =

Form of government in the People's Republic of China

- Simplified Chinese: 人民代表大会制度
Transcriptions
Standard Mandarin
- Hanyu Pinyin: Rénmín Dàibiǎo Dàhuì Zhìdù

The form of government of the People's Republic of China (PRC) under the Chinese Communist Party (CCP) is based on a people's congress system. The system is predicated on the principle of unified state power, in which all powers are vested in a supreme organ of state power, the National People's Congress (NPC). No separation of powers exists in the PRC. All state organs are elected by, answerable to, and have no separate powers than those granted to them by the NPC. By law, all elections at all levels must adhere to the leadership of the CCP.

== System ==
According to the 1982 state constitution, "[a]ll power in the PRC belongs to the people. The organs through which the people exercise state power are the National People's Congress and the local people's congresses at different levels". The National People's Congress is officially China's supreme organ of state power.

=== Levels ===
The People's Congress System was set out in the Electoral Law of 1953 and has been subsequently revised. Currently, there are five levels of people's congresses. From more to less local, they are:

1. people's congresses in villages, minority nationality townships, and towns;
2. people's congresses of cities that are not sub-divided, municipal districts, counties, and autonomous counties;
3. people's congresses in sub-districts of larger cities and in autonomous prefectures;
4. people's congresses in provinces, autonomous regions, and direct-administered municipalities; and
5. the National People's Congress.

Direct elections occur at the two most local levels, while the members at the higher levels are indirectly elected, i.e., elected by those elected in the lower levels. The size of the people's congresses increase with their administrative rank. With some exceptions, township people's congresses usually have 40 to 130 deputies, county people's congresses from 120 to 450, prefectural people's congresses from 240 to 650, provincial people's congresses from 350 to 1,000, and the NPC at around 3,000. The total number of people's congresses throughout China at different levels is over 40,000, and the total number of deputies is in the hundreds of thousands.

=== Role of the Chinese Communist Party ===
Nominations at all levels are controlled by the Chinese Communist Party (CCP), and the CCP's supreme position is enshrined in the state constitution, meaning that the elections have little way of influencing politics. The CCP, through its control of the nomination process, ensures that around 70% of deputies to the people's congresses are party members. The top positions in the system are granted to senior CCP leaders, including the position of the NPCSC chairman, who has always been a member of the Politburo Standing Committee, and the NPCSC vice chairperson positions. Additionally, elections are not pluralistic as no opposition is allowed.

The CCP has maintained a central role in lawmaking, with fluctuations during certain historical periods. The CCP effectively sits above any legal code and the state constitution. CCP principles and slogans are codified into the state's legal code to increase the legitimacy of party rule. The role of the CCP in lawmaking increased under CCP General Secretary Xi Jinping's tenure. Through a variety of documents circulated within the CCP, the party directs China's lawmaking organs such as the NPC Standing Committee in the lawmaking process.

== See also ==
- Law of the People's Republic of China
