= 6th National People's Congress =

1983–1988 Chinese legislative session

6th National People's Congress 第六届全国人民代表大会
- National emblem of China

6 June 1983 – 25 March 1988 (4 years, 263 days) Overview
- Type: Supreme organ of state power
- Election: Indirect elections

Leadership
- Chairman: Peng Zhen
- Vice Chairmen: Chen Pixian, Wei Guoqing, Geng Biao, Hu Juewen, Xu Deheng, Peng Chong, Wang Renzhong, Shi Liang, Zhu Xuefan, Ngapoi Ngawang Jigme, Choekyi Gyaltsen, Saifuddin Azizi, Zhou Gucheng, Yan Jici, Hu Yuzhi, Rong Yiren, Ye Fei, Liao Hansheng, Han Xianchu, and Huang Hua
- Secretary-General: Wang Hanbin
- Standing Committee: 152 (6th)

Members
- Total: 2,884 members

6th National People's Congress
- Traditional Chinese: 第六屆全國人民代表大會
- Simplified Chinese: 第六届全国人民代表大会
Transcriptions
Standard Mandarin
- Hanyu Pinyin: Dìliù Jiè Quánguó Rénmín Dàibiǎo Dàhuì

Abbreviation
- Traditional Chinese: 第六屆全國人大
- Simplified Chinese: 第六届全国人大
Transcriptions
Standard Mandarin
- Hanyu Pinyin: Dìliù Jiè Quánguó Réndà

The 6th National People's Congress (NPC) was in session from 1983 to 1988. It held five sessions in this period.

== Background ==
This new Congress was the first under the current 1982 Constitution, and the first to be elected under the rules of the 1979 Electoral Law of the PRC.

In keeping with the provisions of the law, all deputies of the 6th NPC were elected indirectly from 1982 to February 1983 by the provincial-level legislatures of:

- All 21 Provinces of China
- All 5 Autonomous regions of China
- The city legislatures of Beijing, Shanghai and Tianjin

== Seat distribution ==
Major party	General Secretary	Seats
Chinese Communist Party	Hu Yaobang	1,861
Other Parties	Chairperson	Seats
Chinese Peasants' and Workers' Democratic Party	Ji Fang	543
Jiusan Society	Xu Deheng	543
China Democratic League	Shi Liang Hu Yuzhi	543
China Association for Promoting Democracy	Ye Shengtao	543
China National Democratic Construction Association	Hu Juewen	543
Revolutionary Committee of the Chinese Kuomintang	Wang Kunlun; Qu Wu	543
Taiwan Democratic Self-Government League	Su Ziheng	543
China Zhi Gong Party	Huang Dingchen; Dong Yinchu	543
Independents	N/A	543

== The first session ==
In the 1st Plenary Session in 1983, the Congress elected the state leaders:

- President of the People's Republic of China: Li Xiannian
- Chairman of the Standing Committee of the National People's Congress: Peng Zhen
- Premier of the State Council: Zhao Ziyang
- Chairman of the Central Military Commission: Deng Xiaoping
- President of the Supreme People's Court: Zheng Tianxiang
- Prosecutor-General of the Supreme People's Procuratorate: Yang Yichen
