= 5th National People's Congress =

1978–1983 Chinese legislative session

5th National People's Congress 第五届全国人民代表大会
- National emblem of China

26 February 1978 – 6 June 1983 (5 years, 130 days) Overview
- Type: Supreme organ of state power
- Election: Indirect elections

Leadership
- Chairman: Ye Jianying
- Vice Chairmen: Soong Ching-ling, Nie Rongzhen, Liu Bocheng, Ulanhu, Wu De, Wei Guoqing, Chen Yun, Guo Moruo, Tan Zhenlin, Li Jingquan, Zhang Dingcheng, Cai Chang, Deng Yingchao, Saifuddin Azizi, Liao Chengzhi, Ji Pengfei, Ngapoi Ngawang Jigme, Zhou Jianren, Xu Deheng, and Hu Juewen
- Secretary-General: Ji Pengfei
- Standing Committee: 197 (5th)

Members
- Total: 3,497 members

5th National People's Congress
- Traditional Chinese: 第五屆全國人民代表大會
- Simplified Chinese: 第五届全国人民代表大会
Transcriptions
Standard Mandarin
- Hanyu Pinyin: Dìwǔ Jiè Quánguó Rénmín Dàibiǎo Dàhuì

Abbreviation
- Traditional Chinese: 第五屆全國人大
- Simplified Chinese: 第五届全国人大
Transcriptions
Standard Mandarin
- Hanyu Pinyin: Dìwǔ Jiè Quánguó Réndà

The 5th National People's Congress (NPC) was in session from 1978 to 1983. It succeeded the 4th National People's Congress. It held five plenary sessions in this period.

== Seat distribution ==
Major party	Chairman	Seats
Chinese Communist Party	Hua Guofeng (until 1981); Hu Yaobang (after 1981)	3,116
Other Parties	Chairperson	Seats
Chinese Peasants' and Workers' Democratic Party	Ji Fang	381
Jiusan Society	Xu Deheng	381
China Democratic League	Shi Liang	381
China Association for Promoting Democracy	Zhou Jianren	381
China National Democratic Construction Association	Hu Juewen	381
Revolutionary Committee of the Chinese Kuomintang	Zhu Yunshan; Wang Kunlun	381
Taiwan Democratic Self-Government League	Cai Xiao	381
China Zhi Gong Party	Huang Dingchen	381
Independents	N/A	381

== The first session ==
- Chairman and Vice Chairman: Posts abolished
- Chairman of the Standing Committee of the National People's Congress: Ye Jianying
- Premier of the State Council: Hua Guofeng
- President of the Supreme People's Court: Jiang Hua
- Procurator-General of the Supreme People's Procuratorate: Huang Huoqing

At the first session, the NPC passed the 1978 Constitution of China.

== The fifth session ==
At the fifth session in 1982, the NPC passed the current Constitution of China.
