= List of political parties in China =

The People's Republic of China (PRC) is a one-party state ruled by the Chinese Communist Party (CCP). In addition, eight minor and non-oppositional political parties subservient to the CCP exist. The PRC is officially organized under what the CCP terms a "system of multi-party cooperation and political consultation under the leadership of the CCP," in which the minor parties must accept the leadership of the CCP as a condition of their existence. The state constitution codifies the leadership of the CCP.

Under the "one country, two systems" principle, the special administrative regions of Hong Kong and Macau, which were previously colonies of European powers, operate under a different political system from the rest of mainland China. Both Hong Kong and Macau possess multi-party systems that were introduced just before the handover of the territories to China.

== Legal parties ==
=== Ruling party ===
The Chinese Communist Party is the sole ruling party of the People's Republic of China. Article 1 of the state constitution states that "The defining feature of socialism with Chinese characteristics is the leadership of the Communist Party of China", while the CCP constitution declares the party to be the "highest force for political leadership".

Party	Year founded	Ideology	Members (2025)	Leader	NPC seats	NPCSC seats	NCCPPCC seats (Note: Seats for political parties)
Chinese Communist Party (CCP) 中国共产党 (中共); Zhōngguó Gòngchán Dǎng (Zhōnggòng)	1921	Socialism with Chinese characteristics	101,286,000	Xi Jinping 习近平	2,091 / 2,980	118 / 175	99 / 544

=== Minor parties ===
While only the CCP holds effective power at the national level, there are officially eight minor and non-oppositional parties that exist alongside the CCP that are officially titled democratic parties. Founded before the proclamation of the People's Republic of China, these parties must accept the "leading role" of the CCP as a condition of their continued existence. The official party system of the PRC is termed a "system of multi-party cooperation and political consultation under the leadership of the CCP." According to Human Rights Watch, these parties "play an advisory rather than an oppositional role".

==== List ====
There is officially a ranking system of the parties; according to the Revolutionary Committee of the Chinese Kuomintang, the ranking is based on their "contribution to the new democratic revolution".

Ranking	Party	Year founded	Members (2022)	Leader	NPC seats	NPCSC seats	NCCPPCC seats
1.	Revolutionary Committee of the Chinese Kuomintang (RCCK) 中国国民党革命委员会 (民革); Zhōngguó Guómíndǎng Gémìng Wěiyuánhuì (Míngé)	1948	158,000	Zheng Jianbang 郑建邦	44 / 2,980	6 / 175	65 / 544
2.	China Democratic League (CDL) 中国民主同盟 (民盟); Zhōngguó Mínzhǔ Tóngméng (Mínméng)	1941	356,900	Ding Zhongli 丁仲礼	57 / 2,980	9 / 175	65 / 544
3.	China National Democratic Construction Association (CNDCA) 中国民主建国会 (民建); Zhōngguó Mínzhǔ Jiànguó Huì (Mínjiàn)	1945	237,526	Hao Mingjin 郝明金	57 / 2,980	3 / 175	65 / 544
4.	China Association for Promoting Democracy (CAPD) 中国民主促进会 (民进); Zhōngguó Mínzhǔ Cùjìn Huì (Mínjìn)	1945	200,000	Cai Dafeng 蔡达峰	58 / 2,980	7 / 175	45 / 544
5.	Chinese Peasants' and Workers' Democratic Party (CPWDP) 中国农工民主党 (农工党); Zhōngguó Nónggōng Mínzhǔdǎng (Nónggōngdǎng)	1930	192,000	He Wei 何维	54 / 2,980	7 / 175	45 / 544
6.	China Zhi Gong Party (CZGP) 中国致公党 (致公党); Zhōngguó Zhì Gōng Dǎng (Zhìgōngdǎng)	1925	69,000	Jiang Zuojun 蒋作君	38 / 2,980	3 / 175	30 / 544
7.	Jiusan Society (JS) 九三学社; Jiǔsānxuéshè	1945	222,000	Wu Weihua 武维华	63 / 2,980	4 / 175	45 / 544
8.	Taiwan Democratic Self-Government League (TDSL) 台湾民主自治同盟 (台盟); Táiwān Mínzhǔ Zìzhì Tóngméng (Táiméng)	1947	3,400	Su Hui 苏辉	13 / 2,980	3 / 175	20 / 544

== Other parties ==
=== Banned parties ===
The following parties formed in China are (or have previously been) banned by the government:

Party	Year founded	Ideology	Members (2010)	Leader	NPC seats	NPCSC seats	CPPCC seats
Union of Chinese Nationalists (UOCN) 中国泛蓝联盟	2004	Tridemism; Conservatism	5,000	Wen Yan 文炎	0 / 2,980	0 / 175	0 / 544
Democracy Party of China (DPC) 中国民主党	1998	Liberalism		Liu Dongxing 刘东星	0 / 2,980	0 / 175	0 / 544

- The Communist Party of China (Marxist–Leninist) (Chinese: 中国共产党 (马列)) is an anti-revisionist communist party founded in 1976 by several Maoist rebel factions of the Red Guards in Wuhan, Hubei. They believed it was illegal to arrest the Gang of Four and that the new leadership of the CCP is revisionist and unlawful. They were suppressed after attempts at an armed revolt failed in Shanghai, Zhejiang, Canton and Yunnan.
- The Communist Party of China (Workers' and Peasants' Liberation Army) (Chinese: 中国共产党 (工农解放军)) is an anti-revisionist communist party founded in 1976 by a Maoist rebel faction of the Red Guards in Fujian. They used the old fortifications built during the Chinese Civil War and organized a partisan army named the "Workers' and Peasants' Liberation Army". They announced that the new leadership of the CCP is revisionist and called for uprising and reestablished the Party Central Committee.
- The New Democracy Party of China (Chinese: 中国新民党) was founded by Guo Quan in Nanjing at the end of 2007.
- The Maoist Communist Party of China (Chinese: 中国毛泽东主义共产党) is an anti-revisionist communist party founded in 2008. The party seeks to initiate a "second socialist revolution" to re-establish the dictatorship of the proletariat. It has been subject to crackdowns by the Chinese government.
- The Zhi Xian Party (Chinese: 至宪党), also known as the Chinese Constitutionalist Party in English. Founded by the supporters of Bo Xilai in 2013 and banned in December of that year.

=== Overseas parties ===
- Shanghai National Party is a pro-democracy party which advocates for the independence of Shanghai, led by He Anquan, who left China after the 1989 Tiananmen Square protests and massacre. The party was notable for its opposition to China's COVID-19 lockdown policies. In particular, he referred to the lockdowns in Shanghai as a genocide and maintained a hunger strike outside the Chinese consulate in New York City. Following the Russian invasion of Ukraine, He Anquan visited Ukraine in order to document the war.

== Historical parties ==
=== Defunct parties ===
Party	Ideology	From	To	Ref.
Chinese Empire Reform Association 保救大清皇帝會	Constitutionalism; Constitutional monarchism	1899	1911	
Chinese United League (Tongmenghui) 中國同盟會	Republicanism; Anti-Qing sentiment	1905	1912	
Society for Monarchical Constitutionalism (Royalist Party) 君主立憲維持會 (宗社黨)	Monarchism; Manchurian nationalism	1911		
Democratic Party 民主黨	Conservative liberalism Constitutional monarchism	1912	1913	
Republican Party 共和黨	Conservatism; Republicanism	1912	1913	
Unity Party 統一黨	Conservatism; Statism	1912	1913	
Communications Clique 交通系	Special interests Yellow unionism	1912	1928	
Progressive Party 進步黨	Chinese nationalism Monarchism	1913	1916	
Anfu Club 安福俱樂部	State socialism Republicanism	1918	1920	
Social Democratic Party of China	Social democracy	1926		
Productive People's Party 生产人民党	Anti-imperialism; Left-wing nationalism	1933	1934	
Chinese People's National Salvation Association 中国人民救国会	Anti-imperialism (Kàngrì); Left-wing nationalism	1935	1949	
Kuomintang (Wang Jingwei) 汪偽國民黨	Collaborationism; Pan-Asianism	1939	1945	
Three Principles of the People Comrades Association 三民主義同志聯合會	Three Principles of the People	1945	1949	
Kuomintang Democratic Promotion Association 中國國民黨民主促進會	Three Principles of the People	1946	1949	

==== Defunct regionalist parties ====
Party	Ideology	From	To	Province
Inner Mongolian People's Revolutionary Party; Дотоод Монголын Ардын Хувьсгалын Нам	Communism; Marxism–Leninism	1925	1946	Inner Mongolia
Committee for National Revolution 民族革命委員會	Jadid Movement; Pan-Turkism	1932	1934	Xinjiang
Concordia Association 滿洲國協和會	Fascism; Manchurian nationalism	1932	1945	Manchuria (Manchukuo)
Young Kashgar Party 青年喀什噶爾黨	Uyghur nationalism Jadid Movement	1933	1934	Xinjiang
Xinjiang People's Anti-Imperialist Association 新疆民眾反帝聯合會	Anti-imperialism; Marxism–Leninism	1935	1942	Xinjiang
Kuomintang in Burma 泰緬孤軍	Anti-communism	1949	1954 (officially); 1961	Yunnan, Burma (exiled)
East Turkestan Liberation Organization	Uyghur nationalism Separatism	1997	2003	Xinjiang

==== Defunct political alliances ====
- First United Front, 1923–27
- Second United Front, 1936–47
- China Democratic League, 1941–46 (as an alliance, still active as a party)

=== Extant parties ===
Party	Ideology (in China)	From	To (in China)	Ref.
Kuomintang 中國國民黨	Three Principles of the People; Republicanism; Chinese nationalism	1919	1949	
Young China Party 中國青年黨	Conservatism; Chinese nationalism Anti-communism	1923	1949	
China Democratic Socialist Party 中國民主社會黨	Democratic socialism Chinese nationalism	1946	1949	

== See also ==
- History of political parties in China
- List of ruling political parties by country
- List of political parties in Hong Kong
- List of political parties in Macau
- List of political parties in Taiwan

== Notes ==
1. Seats for political parties
