= He Siyuan =

Chinese educator, politician, and guerrilla leader (1896–1982)

- 何思源
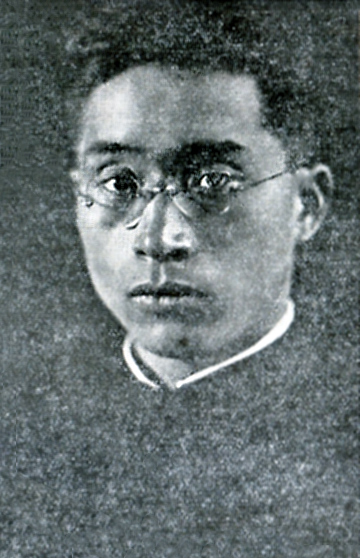
- He Siyuan in Who's Who in China 4th ed. (1931)

Mayor of Beijing
- In office November 1946 – June 1948
- Preceded by: Xiong Bin
- Succeeded by: Liu Yaozhang

Governor of Shandong
- In office December 1944 – November 1946
- Succeeded by: Wang Yaowu

Personal details
- Born: 1896 Heze, Shandong, China
- Died: 28 April 1982 (aged 85–86) Beijing, China
- Party: Kuomintang
- Spouse: He Yiwen (m. 1928)
- Children: Daughters He Luli and Lumei, 2 sons
- Education: Peking University; University of Chicago; University of Paris
- Profession: Educator, politician, translator

He Siyuan (Chinese: 何思源; Wade–Giles: Ho Ssu-yüan; 1896 – April 1982), also spelled Ho Shih-yuan, was a Chinese educator, politician and guerrilla leader.

Educated in China, the United States, and France, he was an economics professor at Sun Yat-sen University and education minister of Shandong Province. When Japan invaded China in 1937, he organized a guerrilla force to fight the resistance war in Shandong, and was the wartime governor of the province. He later became Mayor of Beijing until he negotiated to surrender to communist forces when KMT was losing. He survived Chiang's two attempts to assassinate him, but lost his youngest daughter in the second attack. In 1949 he negotiated the peaceful surrender of Beijing to the Communist forces, ensuring the safety of its millions of residents. Fluent in four European languages, after 1949 he mainly worked on translating foreign publications into Chinese. His elder daughter, He Luli, grew up to become Vice-Mayor of Beijing and Chairwoman of the Revolutionary Committee of the Chinese Kuomintang.

== Early life and education ==
He Siyuan was born in 1896 in Heze, Shandong Province. His courtesy name was Xiancha (仙槎). His family had produced prominent scholar-officials in history, but his own parents were middle-class peasants.

He studied at Shandong No. 6 Provincial High School in Heze, before being admitted to the preparatory school of Peking University in 1915, where he became an active participant of the New Culture Movement. He was especially interested in foreign languages, and in April 1917 his translation of an article on money by Samuel Smiles was published in Chen Duxiu's influential magazine New Youth. He entered Peking University in 1918, majoring in philosophy. He soon joined the Xinchao (New Tide) Society founded by his close friend Fu Sinian, who was to become an eminent educator and scholar. He published many articles in the Xinchao journal.

== Study abroad ==
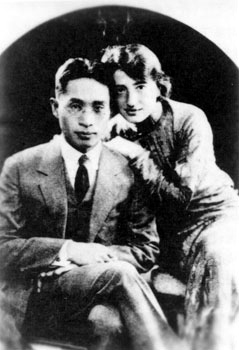
He Siyuan and his French wife Yiwen

After participating in the May Fourth Movement in 1919, He Siyuan left for the United States in August 1919 to study at the University of Chicago. In 1922, he and other Chinese students in the US protested at the Washington Naval Conference to demand Japan's return of Shandong Province to China. Deeply concerned with China's political weakness at the time, he abandoned philosophy and shifted his focus to more practical social sciences such as sociology, economics, and political science. He left the US for Germany, and then went to France and studied at the University of Paris. There he met his future wife, a Frenchwoman who later adopted the Chinese name He Yiwen (何宜文).

== Academic and government career ==
He Siyuan returned to China in 1926, and was hired by his friend Fu Sinian as an economics professor at the newly established Sun Yat-sen University in Guangzhou. He married Yiwen in 1928 and she naturalized as a Chinese citizen. They had four children: sons He Lilu (何理路) and He Yili (何宜理), and daughters He Luli and He Lumei (何鲁美).

While at Sun Yat-sen University he published the books A Brief History of Politics and Diplomacy of Modern China (中国近代政治外交略史, 1927) and Research Methods in Social Sciences (社会科学研究法, 1928). He joined the Kuomintang (Nationalist Party) in 1927. In early 1928, Chiang Kai-shek's Northern Expedition army entered Shandong Province. At the recommendation of Dai Jitao, President of Sun Yat-sen University, Chiang appointed He Siyuan as education minister of his home province, which was then ruled by various warlords only nominally loyal to Chiang's Nationalist government. Despite the lack of funds, He Siyuan invested in teacher training and reorganized the defunct provincial Shandong University and the private Tsingtao University into the National Shandong University in 1932.

== Military career during the Sino-Japanese War ==
After Japan invaded China in 1937 and threatened Shandong's capital Jinan, the Shandong military governor Han Fuju abandoned his army and fled the province (and was later executed). Although He Siyuan was a civilian official, he chose to remain in Shandong and organize a guerrilla force to fight the Japanese.

He Siyuan sent Yiwen and their four children to live in the British concession in Tianjin for safety. When the Japanese attacked the British Colonial government in December 1941, Japan occupied the British concession and Yiwen moved the family home to Tianjin's Italian concession. On 31 December, the Italian authorities arrested Yiwen and the children and handed them to the Japanese, who held them as hostages and demanded He Siyuan's surrender. He refused the demand, condemned Japan and Italy's breach of international law through media and diplomatic channels, and held Italian missionaries in China as a bargaining chip. The Japanese eventually relented and released his family.

During the Anti-Japanese War, He Siyuan cooperated with the Communist guerrilla forces in Shandong and had contact with the Communist leader Chen Yi. In the autumn of 1944, he reported to Chiang Kai-shek in the wartime capital of Chongqing, and Chiang appointed him as Governor of Shandong in December. After the surrender of Japan at the end of World War II in 1945, he took over the province from the occupiers.

== Surrender of Beijing ==
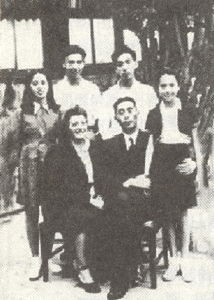
He Siyuan and family: wife Yiwen, daughters He Luli (left) and Lumei (right), and sons Lilu and Yili

In November 1946, General Wang Yaowu was appointed Chairman of Shandong and He Siyuan became Mayor of Beijing (then known as Beiping), succeeding Xiong Bin. He was a popular mayor, personally officiating group weddings in the Huairen Hall in Zhongnanhai. 60 years later, some surviving couples organized a reunion to commemorate him. He renamed a street in Beijing after General Zhang Zizhong, who had supplied He Siyuan's guerrilla force in Shandong but was killed in action in 1940.

During the Chinese Civil War between the Kuomintang and the Communists, He Siyuan clashed with Chiang Kai-shek, who after an attempt in April 1948 to assassinate him in downtown Beijing failed, fired him in June and replaced him with Liu Yaozhang.

In January 1949, He Siyuan negotiated with the Communists for the surrender of Beijing. To prevent the surrender, Chiang Kai-shek made another attempt to assassinate him. In the early morning of 18 January 1949, two bombs exploded in his home, killing his 12-year-old daughter Lumei and gravely wounding his wife, who never fully recovered from the injury. He Siyuan and the other children were also wounded. Undaunted, he proceeded with the negotiation and reached an agreement for the peaceful surrender of Beijing, ensuring the safety of its millions of residents and the preservation of the architectural heritage of the ancient capital. The Juntong agent who planted the bombs, Colonel Duan Yunpeng, was captured in 1954 and executed in 1967.

== Later life and legacy ==
After the founding of the People's Republic of China in 1949, He Siyuan worked for the People's Publishing House and was elected to the 2nd, 3rd, and 4th Chinese People's Political Consultative Conference (CPPCC). Fluent in English, German, French, and Russian, he devoted himself to the translation of foreign works into Chinese, publishing 16 volumes by the early 1960s. He also contributed to the editing of the French–Chinese Dictionary and German Grammar. He died in Beijing on 28 April 1982, at the age of 86.

He Siyuan's daughter He Luli became a doctor and a high-ranking politician. She entered politics after practicing medicine for decades, and served as Vice-Mayor of Beijing, Chairwoman of the Revolutionary Committee of the Chinese Kuomintang, Vice Chairwoman of the CPPCC, and Vice Chairperson of the Standing Committee of the National People's Congress.
