= Democratic parties (China) =

Minor political parties in China

- Simplified Chinese: 民主党派
Transcriptions
Standard Mandarin
- Hanyu Pinyin: Mínzhǔ dǎngpài

In the People's Republic of China (PRC), there are eight minor and non-oppositional political parties, officially termed democratic parties, that are permitted to exist by the ruling Chinese Communist Party (CCP). The eight parties were founded before the PRC's establishment in 1949, and participated in the drafting of the Common Program and the first plenary session of the Chinese People's Political Consultative Conference which led to the PRC's founding. The parties ceased operations during the Cultural Revolution, but resumed operations during the reform and opening up era.

The democratic parties are led by the CCP, and are not opposition parties. They participate in various state bodies such as the National People's Congress, the Chinese People's Political Consultative Conference and the State Council. Membership to these parties is restrictive; prospective party members need a reference from senior party members to join the parties, and membership applications are vetted by the CCP's United Front Work Department, which also selects the leaders of the parties. The work of the parties are mostly consultative in nature, including doing research and giving proposals to the CCP.

== History ==
The democratic parties have all been founded before the proclamation of the People's Republic of China in 1949. They participated in the drafting of the Common Program and the first plenary session of the Chinese People's Political Consultative Conference. On 22 August 1966, amidst the Cultural Revolution, all of the democratic parties ceased operations after an ultimatum by the Beijing Middle School Red Guards. They did not restore their operations until 1978. From the mid-1980s to 2013, their membership increased from 170,000 to 700,000.

== Role ==
The democratic parties are almost completely subservient to the CCP, and must accept the "leading role" of the CCP as a condition of their continued existence. According to the official PRC government view, the party system is termed the "system of multi-party cooperation and political consultation under the leadership of the CCP." The democratic parties are officially described as "neither parties out of office nor opposition parties" and their relationship to the CCP has been officially described as "long-term coexistence and mutual supervision". According to Human Rights Watch, these parties "play an advisory rather than an oppositional role". The democratic parties take part in "united front work" and also take part in the political system, but they have no power at a national level.

The Chinese political system allows for the participation of some members of the minor parties and other non-CCP members in the National People's Congress (NPC), but they are vetted by the CCP. The parties also participate in the Chinese People's Political Consultative Conference (CPPCC). Democratic party members can also be appointed to the State Council; in 2007 Wan Gang of the China Zhi Gong Party was appointed as the minister of science and technology, while Chen Zhu of the Chinese Peasants' and Workers' Democratic Party became minister of health. The democratic parties are funded by the fiscal revenue of the government. One of the ways the CCP controls the parties is through its United Front Work Department (UFWD), which vets the membership applications and selects who is the leader of these parties. UFWD also keeps the parties in check by preventing them from expanding widely in counties and villages. Prospective party members need a reference from senior party members to join the party. CCP members are usually not allowed to join the democratic parties, though they can transfer to work at the democratic parties subject to the request and consent of democratic parties and with the approval of the higher CCP Party committee. Members of democratic parties can apply to join the CCP without needing to withdraw from the democratic parties. Members of the People's Police and the People's Liberation Army cannot join the democratic parties. The cadres of the parties are trained at the Central Institute of Socialism.

The work of democratic parties are mainly consultative in nature, including doing research, making proposals and giving advice to the CCP. Since the early 1990s, the democratic parties have been tasked with conducting surveys on various matters. Members can do a policy survey by drafting a brief plan, which includes problem description, object, and research design, to their local branch, which is submitted each March. If approved, members receive research funding and are given six months to finish the research. A meeting is then held in September to discuss the results. Party members can also file a problem report of approximately 1,000 words including a summary of the problem, analysis, and advice and submit it to the Department of Political Participation of the local party branch, which can refer it to higher authorities including the local CPPCC branch or the UFWD based on its quality. Proposals at the local level can either be adopted or added to the party's proposals at the CPPCC, while an explanation is given if the proposal is rejected. Senior party members, who are elected as members of the CPPCC, can directly submit proposals to the CPPCC's local committees and the National Committee.

== List ==
There is officially a ranking system of the parties; according to the Revolutionary Committee of the Chinese Kuomintang, the ranking is based on their "contribution to the new democratic revolution".

Ranking	Party	Year founded	Members (2022)	Leader	NPC seats	NPCSC seats	NCCPPCC seats (Note: Seats for political parties)
1.	Revolutionary Committee of the Chinese Kuomintang (RCCK) 中国国民党革命委员会 (民革); Zhōngguó Guómíndǎng Gémìng Wěiyuánhuì (Míngé)	1948	158,000	Zheng Jianbang 郑建邦	44 / 2,980	6 / 175	65 / 544
2.	China Democratic League (CDL) 中国民主同盟 (民盟); Zhōngguó Mínzhǔ Tóngméng (Mínméng)	1941	356,900	Ding Zhongli 丁仲礼	57 / 2,980	9 / 175	65 / 544
3.	China National Democratic Construction Association (CNDCA) 中国民主建国会 (民建); Zhōngguó Mínzhǔ Jiànguó Huì (Mínjiàn)	1945	237,526	Hao Mingjin 郝明金	57 / 2,980	3 / 175	65 / 544
4.	China Association for Promoting Democracy (CAPD) 中国民主促进会 (民进); Zhōngguó Mínzhǔ Cùjìn Huì (Mínjìn)	1945	200,000	Cai Dafeng 蔡达峰	58 / 2,980	7 / 175	45 / 544
5.	Chinese Peasants' and Workers' Democratic Party (CPWDP) 中国农工民主党 (农工党); Zhōngguó Nónggōng Mínzhǔdǎng (Nónggōngdǎng)	1930	192,000	He Wei 何维	54 / 2,980	7 / 175	45 / 544
6.	China Zhi Gong Party (CZGP) 中国致公党 (致公党); Zhōngguó Zhì Gōng Dǎng (Zhìgōngdǎng)	1925	69,000	Jiang Zuojun 蒋作君	38 / 2,980	3 / 175	30 / 544
7.	Jiusan Society (JS) 九三学社; Jiǔsānxuéshè	1945	222,000	Wu Weihua 武维华	63 / 2,980	4 / 175	45 / 544
8.	Taiwan Democratic Self-Government League (TDSL) 台湾民主自治同盟 (台盟); Táiwān Mínzhǔ Zìzhì Tóngméng (Táiméng)	1947	3,400	Su Hui 苏辉	13 / 2,980	3 / 175	20 / 544

=== Membership scope ===
Per a 1996 document issued by the UFWD, each democratic party is composed of a certain demographic:

- The Revolutionary Committee of the Chinese Kuomintang consists mainly of people who have links with the Kuomintang, have historical and social connections with the committee, or have relationships with Taiwan along with specialists in social and legal affairs, and in business relating to agriculture, rural areas, and rural people.
- The China Democratic League is mainly made up of mid and senior-level intellectuals in the fields of culture, education, natural and social sciences, and technology.
- The China National Democratic Construction Association is mainly made up of entrepreneurs from the building, manufacturing, construction, financial, or commercial industries in both private and state sectors, and others in the field of economics.
- The China Association for Promoting Democracy mainly represents high-level intellectuals engaged in education and cultural publishing media.
- The China Peasants and Workers Democratic Party is made up of members who mostly work in the fields of public health, medicine, and associated fields in science and technology.
- The China Zhi Gong Party is mainly made up of the middle and higher ranks of returned overseas Chinese and their relatives, and representatives of people with overseas connections.
- The Jiusan Society mostly consists of high- and medium-level intellectuals in the fields of science, technology, and education.
- The Taiwan Democratic Self-Government League is mostly composed of prominent people from Taiwan or people of Taiwanese heritage who now reside on the mainland.

== See also ==
- Bloc party
- List of political parties in China
- Popular front
- United front
