= He Luli =

Chinese paediatrician and politician (1934–2022)

- 何鲁丽

Vice Chairwoman of the Chinese People's Political Consultative Conference
- In office 13 March 1996 – 13 March 1998
- Chairman: Li Ruihuan

Vice Chairwoman of the Standing Committee of the National People's Congress
- In office 16 March 1998 – 15 March 2008
- Chairman: Li Peng; Wu Bangguo

Chairwoman of the Revolutionary Committee of the Chinese Kuomintang
- In office 11 November 1996 – 15 December 2007
- Preceded by: Li Peiyao
- Succeeded by: Zhou Tienong

Vice Chairwoman of the Revolutionary Committee of the Chinese Kuomintang
- In office 19 November 1988 – 11 November 1996
Other positions
Chairman	Zhu Xuefan; Li Peiyao
President of the China Population Welfare Foundation
In office 8 February 1999 – 19 November 2004
Preceded by	Gu Mu
Succeeded by	Jiang Zhenghua
President of the Central Institute of Socialism
In office March 1999 – 18 October 2008
Preceded by	Yang Jike
Succeeded by	Yan Junqi
Vice Chairwoman of the All-China Women's Federation
In office 6 September 1993 – 4 September 1998
Chairwoman	Chen Muhua
Preceded by	Yang Jike
Succeeded by	Yan Junqi

Personal details
- Born: 7 June 1934 Jinan, Shandong, China
- Died: 19 March 2022 (aged 87) Beijing
- Party: Revolutionary Committee of the Chinese Kuomintang
- Spouse: Rong Guohuang (m. 1958; died 1989)
- Children: 2 sons
- Parents: He Siyuan (father); He Yiwen (mother)
- Education: Beijing Medical University
- Profession: Paediatrician

Chinese name
- Traditional Chinese: 何魯麗
- Simplified Chinese: 何鲁丽
Transcriptions
Standard Mandarin
- Hanyu Pinyin: Hé Lǔlì
- Wade–Giles: Ho Lu-li

He Luli (Chinese: 何鲁丽; Wade–Giles: Ho Lu-li; 7 June 1934 – 19 March 2022) was a Chinese politician and paediatrician. She entered politics after practicing medicine for 27 years, serving as vice-mayor of Beijing, chairwoman of the Revolutionary Committee of the Chinese Kuomintang, Vice Chairperson of the Chinese People's Political Consultative Conference, and Vice Chairperson of the Standing Committee of the National People's Congress.

He Luli was the daughter of He Siyuan, the Kuomintang mayor of Beijing who negotiated the peaceful surrender of the city to the Chinese Communist Party near the end of the Chinese Civil War.

== Early life ==
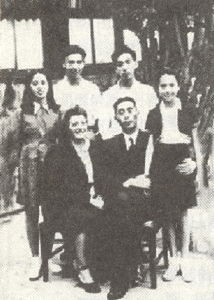
The He family in 1947: He Siyuan and wife He Yiwen, daughters He Luli (left) and He Lumei (right), and sons He Lilu and He Yili

He Luli was born on 7 June 1934, in Jinan, Shandong, China. Her father He Siyuan was the French-educated education minister of Shandong Province, and her mother was a Frenchwoman who adopted the Chinese name He Yiwen (何宜文). He Luli had two older brothers and a younger sister.

After Japan invaded China in 1937, He Siyuan led a guerrilla operation in Shandong to fight the enemy. He sent his wife and four children to live in the British concession in Tianjin. After the Pacific War broke out in December 1941, Japan occupied the British concession and Yiwen moved the family home to Tianjin's Italian concession. On 31 December, the Italian authorities arrested Yiwen and the children and handed them to the Japanese, who held them as hostages and demanded He Siyuan's surrender. He rejected the demand, condemned Japan and Italy's breach of international law through diplomatic channels, and held Italian missionaries in China as a bargaining chip. Japan eventually relented and released the family.

After the end of World War II, He Siyuan served as Mayor of Beijing (then known as Beiping). During the ensuing Chinese Civil War, he negotiated with the Communists for the peaceful surrender of Beiping. To prevent the surrender, Chiang Kai-shek sent agents to assassinate him. In the early morning of 18 January 1949, two bombs exploded in the He residence, killing Luli's 12-year-old sister Lumei (何鲁美) and gravely injuring her mother. The rest of the family were also wounded. The Juntong agent who planted the bombs, Colonel Duan Yunpeng, was captured in 1954 and executed in 1967.

== Career ==
After the establishment of the People's Republic of China, He Luli studied medicine at Beijing Medical University (now Peking University Health Science Center) from 1952 to 1957. Starting in 1957, she worked as a doctor for 27 years at Beijing Children's Hospital, Xicheng District Children's Hospital, and Beijing No. 2 Hospital.

He Luli entered politics in 1984, when she was appointed deputy mayor of Xicheng District of Beijing. She joined the Revolutionary Committee of the Chinese Kuomintang (RCCK) in April 1986. She was promoted to deputy mayor of Beijing in 1988, and served in that position until 1996. She also concurrently served as president of the Beijing Red Cross Society. In 1993 she was elected vice president of the All-China Women's Federation.

In 1996 she was elected chairwoman of the RCCK, replacing Li Peiyao, who had been murdered. She was reelected twice in 1997 and 2002, serving until 2007. She also became Vice Chairperson of the Chinese People's Political Consultative Conference (CPPCC) in March 1996.

In March 1998, she was elected Vice Chairperson of the Standing Committee of the National People's Congress. She was reelected in March 2003, serving until 2008.

In addition, she was a member of the Hong Kong SAR Preparatory Committee in 1997 and the Macao SAR Preparatory Committee in 1999. In 1999 she became president of the Central Institute of Socialism and honorary vice-president of the Red Cross Society of China. In that year she also won a World Health Organization award for her contributions to the anti-smoking movement in China.

== Personal life ==
He Luli married fellow physician Rong Guohuang (荣国煌) in 1958; they had two sons. Rong died in 1989. He Luli died on 19 March 2022, at the age of 87.
