= Kuomintang Democratic Promotion Association =

Kuomintang Democratic Promotion Association 中國國民黨民主促進會
- Chairperson: Li Jishen
- Vice Chairman: Cai Tingkai
- Founded: April 1946
- Dissolved: November 1949
- Split from: Kuomintang
- Merged into: Revolutionary Committee of the Chinese Kuomintang
- Ideology: Three Principles of the People
- Political position: Left-wing
- National affiliation: Left-wing of the Kuomintang

The Kuomintang Democratic Promotion Association was a left-wing organization in the Republic of China that split from the Kuomintang, existing from 1946 to 1949.

== History ==
In March 1946, Li Jishen, He Xiangning, Cai Tingkai and others initiated the establishment of the Kuomintang Democratic Promotion Association in Hong Kong. Li Jishen was the chairman, Cai Tingkai was the vice chairman, and Tan Mingzhao was the secretary-general. The association officially took the realization of the Three Principles of the People of the revolution and the establishment of an independent, free, democratic and happy new China as its highest standard of action. It advocated that all democratic parties should be equal, opposed one-party rule of the Kuomintang, supported a coalition government, nationalization of the army, and implemented a planned economy based on the principle of people's livelihood. The association also advocated popular education, gender equality, and protection of overseas Chinese. It was founded in Guangzhou in April 1946.

In January 1948, together with the Three Principles of the People Comrades Association and other dissidents of the Kuomintang, the Association jointly formed the Revolutionary Committee of the Chinese Kuomintang (RCCK) in Hong Kong and continued the activities of the Kuomintang Democratic Promotion Association. In September 1949, the association attended the first plenary session of the Chinese People's Political Consultative Conference and participated in the preparations for the founding of the People's Republic of China. In November 1949, the 2nd National Congress of the Left Wing of the Kuomintang was held in Beijing, deciding to integrate the Revolutionary Committee of the Chinese Kuomintang, the Three Principles of the People Comrades Association, the Kuomintang Democratic Promotion Association, and other left-wing forces of the Kuomintang into one organization, namely, all of them were incorporated into the Revolutionary Committee of the Chinese Kuomintang. The Kuomintang Democratic Promotion Association was simultaneously declared dissolved.
