= First plenary session of the Chinese People's Political Consultative Conference =

1949 constituent assembly in Beijing

First Plenary Session of the Chinese People's Political Consultative Conference 中国人民政治协商会议 第一届全体会议
- Meeting to formulate the Common Program

Type
- Type: Constituent assembly

History
- Founded: 21 September 1949
- Disbanded: 30 September 1949
- Preceded by: Political Consultative Conference; Preparatory Committee for the New Political Consultative Conference
- Succeeded by: National Committee of the Chinese People's Political Consultative Conference

Leadership
- Presidium: 89 members
- Secretary-General: Lin Boqu, Chinese Communist Party

Structure
- Seats: 585
- Official representative political groups: Party delegates (142); Chinese Communist Party (16); Revolutionary Committee of the Chinese Kuomintang (16); China Democratic League (16); China National Democratic Construction Association (12); Independents (10); China Association for Promoting Democracy (8); Chinese Peasants' and Workers' Democratic Party (10); Chinese People's National Salvation Association (10); Three Principles of the People Comrades Association (10); Kuomintang Democratic Promotion Association (8）; China Zhi Gong Party (6); Jiusan Society (5); Taiwan Democratic Self-Government League (5); Chinese New Democracy Youth League (10); Regional delegates (102); Representatives from Liberated Zones (95); Representatives from Zones to be Liberated (7); People's Liberation Army (60); Group representatives (206); Specially invited representatives (75)
- Official representative committees: Organization Law Draft Preparation Committee; Common Program Draft Preparation Committee; Central People's Government Organization Law Draft Preparation Committee; National Flag, National Emblem, National Capital and Calendar Plan Review Committee; Deputy Proposal Review Committee

Meeting place
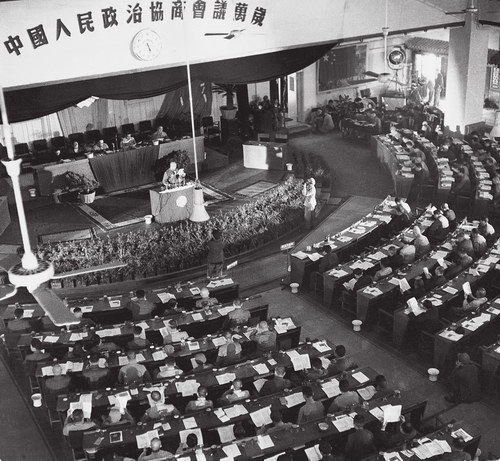
- North China People's Government; Beiping City (before September 27); Beijing City (since the September 27); Huairen Hall, Zhongnanhai

The first plenary session of the Chinese People's Political Consultative Conference was held from 21 to 30 September 1949 at the Huairen Hall in Zhongnanhai, Beijing. The meeting prepared the founding of the People's Republic of China.

== Background ==
In 1945, the Chinese Communist Party (CCP) and the Kuomintang (KMT) signed the Double Tenth Agreement in Chongqing in an effort to build a sustainable peace between the two sides. As part of the deals provisions, a Political Consultative Conference was convened on 10–31 January 1946 to draft a new constitution, although the talks ultimately collapsed and the Chinese Civil War resumed. On 1 May 1948, CCP Chairman Mao Zedong called for "Every democratic party and group, every people’s organization and social dignitary" to form a new Political Consultative Conference, which would "discuss and then convoke a people’s representative congress that will turn establish a democratic coalition government". The appeal created some frictions in minor parties, in the China Democratic Socialist Party, where members of the Reform Faction were leaning towards CCP and supported the declaration on their own initiative. It was also positively received by exiled political leaders in Hong Kong, whose parties were banned under Chiang Kai-shek's government.

The first meeting between the democratic parties and the CCP took place in northeast China, which was under CCP control, in August 1948. Political refugees reached from Hong Kong to Harbin by boat and by crossing China's border with North Korea. During their visit, the visitors were given tours of Communist-ruled rural areas and cities. A secret meeting in Harbin on 25 November 1948 is held, including "democratic party" members such as Shen Junru, Li Jishen and Zhang Bojun and CCP members including Gao Gang and Li Fuchun. The meetings ended in a decision to establish a preparatory committee to form a Political Consultative Conference, which would be held in 1949 and formulate a Common Program and a coalition government. Afterwards, the CCP and democratic parties decided to draft a provisional action program. The program contained a provision giving the democratic parties the right to withdraw from the preparatory committee, although this is considered to be a symbolic provision as withdrawing would effectively marginalize their political influence.

In December 1948, Mao informed Soviet leader Joseph Stalin through intermediaries of his worries the United States intends to "infiltrate the political consultative meeting and the democratic coalition government". Stalin, agreeing with Mao, proposed to him that he should immediately convene the conference after CCP takes over Beijing. Mao replied by saying the time to establish the conference has not yet come, and that he wants to wait until the People's Liberation Army (PLA) to take Nanjing, Wuhan and Shanghai. Stalin later sent special envoy Anastas Mikoyan on a secret mission, who arrived in the then-CCP headquarters in Xibaipo on January 30, 1949. On that day, as well as 4 February, Mikoyan had extensive talks with Mao on forming a preparatory committee. On 5–13 March 1949, the 7th Central Committee of the Chinese Communist Party held its second plenum, where it approved of a plan to convene a political consultative conference.

On 11 June 1949, a preparatory meeting for the preparatory meeting for the PCC was held, where a standing committee for the PCC preparatory meeting was chosen. On the first day of the PCC preparatory meeting on 15 June, Mao expressed confidence the conference would succeed because all the delegates wanted the end of the "domination of imperialism, feudalism, and capitalism" and end the Kuomintang government. The CCP had three preconditions for all conference delegates: the recognition of CCP leadership, the commitment to pursue the revolution to its completion, and the establishment of a people's democratic dictatorship that excluded "counterrevolutionary elements" and barred the possibility of an alternative path.

The first preparatory meeting ended with the election of a 21-member Permanent Committee as well as the members of 6 committees. They were responsible for selecting the composition of the new conference, to prepare the Common Program and the organic laws for the conference and the government, to decide on the new national emblem, flag, and anthem. Zhou Enlai concentrated on the drafting of the program, and the first draft was complete by 30 June. The program was then revised five times, with Mao making some structural adjustments. Between the months of the preparatory meeting and the first plenary session, the 6 committees met regularly while the democratic parties and the mass organizations held their meetings to elect their delegates to the conference. The future members of the conference were extensively vetted for their political leanings, and the first group of representatives were approved at the 8th meeting of the Standing Committee of the Preparatory Committee after three months of consultation. On 17 September, it was decided the new Political Consultative Conference would be named the "Chinese People's Political Consultative Conference" (CPPCC). The list of delegates were finalized by 20 September.

== The first plenary session ==
The 1st Plenary Session of the CPPCC was held on 21–30 September 1949 in Huairen Hall, Zhongnanhai, Beijing (then named Beiping) to discuss matters related to the establishment of the People's Republic of China. The Session included 662 representatives, including 235 group representatives, 116 regional representatives, 165 party representatives, 71 People's Liberation Army representatives, and 75 specially invited representatives. Mao Zedong presided over the opening meeting and delivered a speech. On 27 September, the meeting adopted the Organic Law of the Chinese People's Political Consultative Conference and the Organic Law of the Central People's Government of the People's Republic of China. The meeting also adopted the following resolution:

1. The capital of the People's Republic of China will be Beiping, which will be renamed Beijing with immediate effect,
2. The People's Republic of China will adopt the AD calendar system,
3. Before the national anthem of the PRC is determined, the March of the Volunteers will be used as the national anthem,
4. The national flag will be the Five-star Red Flag.

On 29 September, the meeting adopted the Common Program on 29 September. On 30 September, the plenary session elected the 1st National Committee of the CPPCC. It also approved the establishment of the Chinese Academy of Sciences and the building of the Monument to the People's Heroes. It additionally elected the Central People's Government Committee with Mao as its chairman and Zhu De, Liu Shaoqi, Soong Ching-ling, Zhang Lan, Li Jishen and Gao Gang as its vice chairpersons.

Central People's Government Chairmanship Election
Candidates	For	Vote share
Mao Zedong	576	100% (Note: According to a book by Dai Qing, Zhang Dongsun did not vote in favor. However, this statement only appears in the book written by Dai Qing and has not been confirmed by other sources.)

=== Delegates ===
Groups	Seats
Party delegates	142
Chinese Communist Party	16
Revolutionary Committee of the Chinese Kuomintang	16
China Democratic League	16
China National Democratic Construction Association	12
Independents	10
China Association for Promoting Democracy	8
Chinese Peasants' and Workers' Democratic Party	10
Chinese People's National Salvation Association	10
Three Principles of the People Comrades Association	10
Kuomintang Democratic Promotion Association	8
China Zhi Gong Party	6
Jiusan Society	5
Taiwan Democratic Self-Government League	5
Chinese New Democracy Youth League	10
Regional delegates	102
Representatives from Liberated Zones	95
Representatives from Zones to be Liberated	7
People's Liberation Army	60
Group representatives	206
Specially invited representatives	75
