= Zhou Tienong =

Chinese politician (1938–2023)

- 周铁农

Vice Chairman of the Chinese People's Political Consultative Conference
- In office 13 March 1998 – 13 March 2008
- Chairman: Li Ruihuan; Jia Qinglin

Vice Chairman of the Standing Committee of the National People's Congress
- In office 15 March 2008 – 14 March 2013
- Chairman: Wu Bangguo

Chairman of the Revolutionary Committee of the Chinese Kuomintang
- In office December 2007 – December 2012
- Preceded by: He Luli
- Succeeded by: Wan Exiang

Personal details
- Born: November 1938 Shenyang, Liaoning, Manchukuo
- Died: 3 November 2023 (aged 84)
- Party: Revolutionary Committee of the Kuomintang
- Education: Peking University

Zhou Tienong (Chinese: 周铁农; pinyin: Zhōu Tiěnóng; November 1938 – 3 November 2023) was a Chinese politician. He served as Vice Chairman of the Standing Committee of the National People's Congress, Chairman of the Revolutionary Committee of the Kuomintang, and Vice-Governor of Heilongjiang Province. He studied at Peking University from 1955 to 1960. Zhou died on 3 November 2023, at the age of 84.
