= Liu Yaozhang =

Chinese journalist and politician (1897–1993)

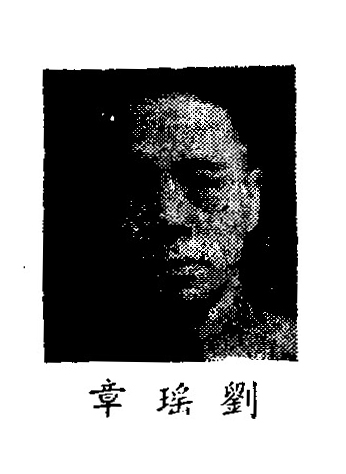
Liu as a member of the National Constituent Assembly

Liu Yaozhang (Chinese: 劉瑤章; November 1897 – 28 May 1993) was a Chinese journalist and politician.

Liu was a native of Anxin County, Zhili. He earned a degree in philosophy at Peking University, and began working in mass media; successively as an editor for Social Welfare in Beiping, a chief editor of the same publication in Tianjin, and later for the Central News Agency.

Liu joined the Kuomintang in 1925, and held membership in the National Political Assembly, the Central Committee of the Kuomintang, as well as positions on the Hebei branch of the Kuomintang, and the Hebei Provincial Provisional Senate. In 1946, he sat on the National Constituent Assembly, and was appointed Mayor of Beiping in June 1948. Liu and Fu Zuoyi surrendered Beiping to Communist forces in 1949.

In the People's Republic of China, Liu served in several positions within the Central Ministry of Water Resources and its successor, the Ministry of Water Resources. In 1954, Liu joined the Revolutionary Committee of the Chinese Kuomintang, and was elected to its third, fifth, and sixth central committee, as well as a standing member of its Central Supervisory Committee. He served on the second through seventh convocations of the National Committee of the Chinese People's Political Consultative Conference.

Liu died in Beijing on 28 May 1993.
