= Three Principles of the People Comrades Association =

Three Principles of the People Comrades Association 三民主義同志聯合會
- Founded: October 28, 1945
- Dissolved: November 1949
- Split from: Kuomintang
- Merged into: Revolutionary Committee of the Chinese Kuomintang
- Ideology: Three Principles of the People
- Political position: Left-wing
- National affiliation: Left-wing of the Kuomintang

The Three Principles of the People Comrades Association was a political party in the Republic of China formed by a group of people within the Kuomintang who opposed Chiang Kai-shek after the Second Sino-Japanese War. The association was established in Chongqing, China on 28 October 1945, initiated by Tan Pingshan and others. It participated in the first plenary session of the Chinese People's Political Consultative Conference led by the Chinese Communist Party. After the foundation of the People's Republic of China, it merged with the Revolutionary Committee of the Chinese Kuomintang.

== History ==
The Central Committee of the Three Principles of the People Comrades Association established a Provisional Central Executive Committee and a Provisional Supervisory Committee, with branches in various regions. After its establishment in October 1945, the Association actively participated in the movement opposing Chiang Kai-shek's policies. During the Political Consultative Conference, in the spring of 1946, a political conference was established to promote unity among the democratic faction of the Kuomintang. On October 11 of the same year, the Shanghai branch of the Association issued Our Stance on the Current Situation, taking "ceasefire first, peace first" as the sole prerequisite for resolving the current situation.

In February 1947, the 4th Political Conference was held in Shanghai, which said: "The reactionary elements within the Kuomintang betrayed the revolution in 1927, established a reactionary rule, and after the victory of the War of Resistance Against Japan, colluded with US imperialism to launch an unprecedented civil war. The conference further called on the patriotic and democratic forces within the Kuomintang to unite and form a vital force to strive for peace and democracy, and to form a democratic united front with the workers and peasants. The conference demanded that the democratic faction of the Kuomintang should participate in future political consultations." On 1 January 1948, together with the Kuomintang Democratic Promotion Association and other democratic representatives of the Kuomintang, the party initiated the organization of the Revolutionary Committee of the Chinese Kuomintang in Hong Kong, and continued the independent activities of the Association. On May 5, 1948, he sent a joint telegram with representatives of other democratic parties and non-partisan individuals, supporting the Chinese Communist Party's call to convene a new Political Consultative Conference and establish a coalition government.

In January 1949, the Association announced its acceptance of the leadership of the CCP to continue its revolutionary activities. On September 21 of the same year, it sent representatives to the first plenary session of the Chinese People's Political Consultative Conference to participate in the formulation of the Common Program and the election of the Central People's Government. Its key members included Tan Pingshan, Liu Yazi, Wang Kunlun, Chen Mingshu, Guo Chuntao, Yang Jie, Zhu Yunshan, Xu Baoju, Yu Zhenying, and Ma Yinchu . It founded publications such as Minlian (People's League) and Minchao (People's Tide). The establishment of the Association laid a foundation for the unification of political parties in China, excluding the Kuomintang. In November 1949, the anti-Chiang faction of the Kuomintang held its second representative conference, deciding to unify the Revolutionary Committee of the Chinese Kuomintang, the Three Principles of the People Comrades Association, and the Kuomintang Democratic Promotion Association into one organization—the Revolutionary Committee of the Chinese Kuomintang. The Association simultaneously announced its dissolution.

== Ideology ==
The core ideology of the party was the Three Principles of the People, advocating that the Kuomintang should immediately and automatically end its one-party rule, that all democratic parties should be equal, and that a unified democratic coalition government should be established; that a planned economy based on the principle of people's livelihood should be implemented, that private capital should be controlled, that state capital should be developed, and that land ownership should be equalized; that basic freedoms of the people should be guaranteed; and that the army should be nationalized.
