= Wan Exiang =

Chinese politician (born 1956)

- 万鄂湘
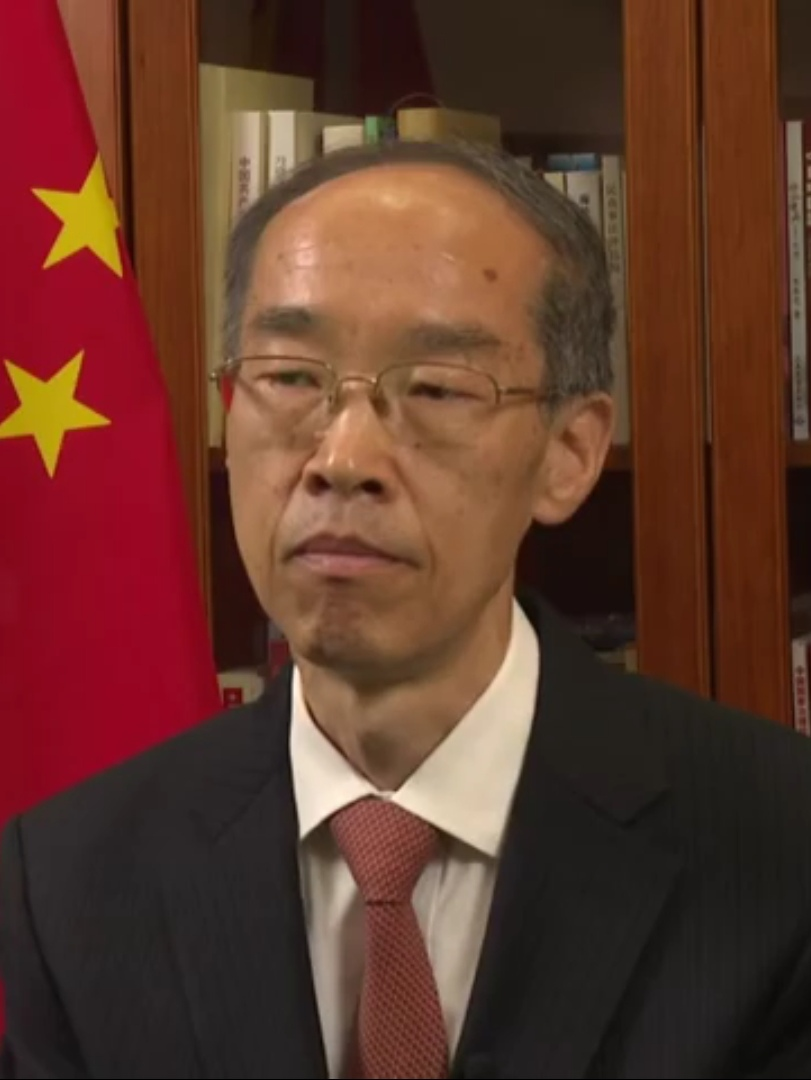

Vice Chairperson of the Standing Committee of the National People's Congress
- In office 17 March 2018 – 10 March 2023
- Chairman: Li Zhanshu

Chairman of the Revolutionary Committee of the Chinese Kuomintang
- In office 18 December 2012 – 10 December 2022
- Preceded by: Zhou Tienong
- Succeeded by: Zheng Jianbang

Vice President of the Supreme People's Court
- In office 29 April 2000 – 14 March 2013
- President: Xiao Yang; Wang Shengjun

Personal details
- Born: May 1956 (age 69) Gong'an County, Hubei, China
- Party: Revolutionary Committee of the Chinese Kuomintang
- Education: Wuhan University (BA, LLD); Yale University (LLM)

Wan Exiang (Chinese: 万鄂湘; pinyin: Wàn Èxiāng; born May 1956) is a Chinese politician and jurist who served as a vice chairperson of the Standing Committee of the National People's Congress from 2018 to 2023. He was the chairman of the Revolutionary Committee of the Chinese Kuomintang between 2012 and 2022.

== Early life and education ==
Wan Exiang was born in Gong'an, Hubei, in 1956. Wan received his B.A. degree from Wuhan University in 1980, LL.M. degree from Yale Law School in 1987 and LL.D. degree from Wuhan University School of Law in 1988. After graduation, he joined the faculty of Wuhan University.

== Career ==
Wan was elected as the vice president of the Intermediate People's Court of Wuhan in 1996, vice president of the High People's Court of Hubei in 1999, and Vice President of the Supreme People's Court of China in 2000. He was elected the chairman of the Revolutionary Committee of the Chinese Kuomintang in 2012.

In a 2013 interview, Wan said that the Chinese people crave the growth and stability of one-party rule and that the West had a fixation with electoral democracy. "We once had more than 300 parties in the early stage of the Republic of China, and the consequences were rivalry among political parties and warlords, and national disintegration. China could never have obtained such brilliant economic success today if we followed that kind of political system."

Wan attended the Group of 20 parliament speakers in Tokyo, Japan, on November 4, 2019. He announced that China is ready to strengthen parliamentary exchanges with Japan to better promote the improvement and development of bilateral relations.

On 7 December 2020, pursuant to Executive Order 13936, the US Department of the Treasury imposed sanctions on all 14 Vice Chairpeople of the National People's Congress, including Wan, for "undermining Hong Kong's autonomy and restricting the freedom of expression or assembly."
