= Li Peiyao =

Chinese politician

- 李沛瑶

Vice Chairman of the Standing Committee of the National People's Congress
- In office 27 March 1993 – 2 February 1996
- Chairman: Qiao Shi

Chairman of Revolutionary Committee of the Chinese Kuomintang
- In office December 1992 – 2 February 1996
- Preceded by: Zhu Xuefan
- Succeeded by: He Luli

Personal details
- Born: 1 June 1933 Cangwu, Guangxi
- Died: 2 February 1996 (aged 62) Beijing
- Cause of death: Homicide
- Party: Revolutionary Committee of the Chinese Kuomintang
- Parent: Li Jishen (father)
- Education: Beijing Institute of Aeronautics

Li Peiyao (simplified Chinese: 李沛瑶; traditional Chinese: 李沛瑤; pinyin: Lǐ Pèiyáo; 1 June 1933 – 2 February 1996) was a Chinese politician. He was born in Cangwu County, Guangxi, the son of Li Jishen, the founder of the Revolutionary Committee of the Chinese Kuomintang (RCCK), a breakaway faction of the Kuomintang that cooperated with the Communists. He served as Chairman of the RCCK from 1992 to his death in 1996 and a vice-chairman of the National People's Congress Standing Committee from 1993 to 1996.

In February 1996, Li was killed by Zhang Jinlong (张金龙), an 18-year-old security guard from the People's Armed Police (PAP). According to court documents, Li returned home and caught Zhang in the middle of a burglary attempt. After a physical struggle, Zhang repeatedly chopped Li with a cleaver from the home kitchen, and Li bled to death. Zhang then continued looting Li's apartment, carrying with him an expensive camera, a leather jacket, and other goods. He was discovered by a neighbour who reported the incident to the police. Zhang was arrested and sentenced to death. PAP commander Lt. Gen. Ba Zhongtan was fired as a result of the incident.
