= New Democracy =

Maoist political conception of democracy

- Simplified Chinese: 新民主主义
- Traditional Chinese: 新民主主義
Transcriptions
Standard Mandarin
- Hanyu Pinyin: Xīn mínzhǔ zhǔyì

New Democratic Revolution
- Simplified Chinese: 新民主主义革命
- Traditional Chinese: 新民主主義革命
Transcriptions
Standard Mandarin
- Hanyu Pinyin: Xīn mínzhǔ zhǔyì gémìng

New Democracy, or the New Democratic Revolution, is a type of democracy in Marxism, based on Mao Zedong's Bloc of Four Social Classes theory in post-revolutionary China which argued originally that democracy in China would take a path that was decisively distinct from that in any other country. He also said every colonial or semi-colonial country would have its own unique path to democracy, given that particular country's own social and material conditions. Mao labeled representative democracy in the Western world as Old Democracy, characterizing parliamentarianism as just an instrument to promote the dictatorship of the bourgeoisie or the land-owning class. He also found his concept of New Democracy not in contrast with the Soviet-style dictatorship of the proletariat which he assumed would be the dominant political structure of a post-capitalist world. Mao spoke about how he wanted to create a New China, a country freed from the feudal and semi-feudal aspects of its old culture as well as Japanese imperialism.

Regarding the political structure of New Democracy, Mao said in Section V of text On New Democracy, written in January 1940, as follows:

China may now adopt a system of people's congresses, from the national people's congress down to the provincial, county, district and township people's congresses, with all levels electing their respective governmental bodies. But if there is to be a proper representation for each revolutionary class according to its status in the state, a proper expression of the people's will, a proper direction for revolutionary struggles and a proper manifestation of the spirit of New Democracy, then a system of really universal and equal suffrage, irrespective of sex, creed, property or education, must be introduced. Such is the system of democratic centralism. Only a government based on democratic centralism can fully express the will of all the revolutionary people and fight the enemies of the revolution most effectively. There must be a spirit of refusal to be "privately owned by the few" in the government and the army; without a genuinely democratic system this cannot be attained and the system of government and the state system will be out of harmony.

As time passed, the New Democracy concept was adapted to other countries and regions with similar justifications.

== Concept ==
The concept of New Democracy aims to overthrow feudalism and achieve independence from colonialism. However, it dispenses with the rule predicted by Karl Marx that a capitalist class would usually follow such a struggle, claiming instead to seek to enter directly into socialism through a coalition of classes fighting the old ruling order. The coalition is subsumed under the leadership and guidance of the working class and its communist party, working with the communists irrespective of their competing ideologies in order to achieve the more immediate goal of a "new democratic order". Led by a communist party, a New Democracy allows for limited development of national capitalism as part of the effort to replace foreign imperialism and domestic feudalism.

The Chinese communists hoped that the working class in a similar fashion could then build full-blown socialism and communism in spite of the competing class interests of the social classes of the bloc. In China, the application of the New Democracy concept resulted in the CCP's appeal to a coalition of the urban and rural poor, progressive intellectuals, and bourgeois "patriotic democrats," ultimately contributing to a successful revolution.

The bloc of classes reflecting the principles of New Democracy is symbolized most readily by the stars on the flag of China. The largest star symbolizes the Party's leadership and the surrounding four smaller stars symbolizing the Bloc of Four Classes, i.e. proletarian workers, peasants, the intelligentsia and the nationally based capitalists. This is the coalition of classes for Mao's New Democratic Revolution as he described it in his works. Mao's New Democracy explains the Bloc of Four Classes as an unfortunate but necessary consequence of imperialism as described by Lenin.

In an April 1943 article, Marxist philosopher Ai Siqi called for a "new labor perspective," emphasizing the importance of labor as a means through which the masses became masters of their own fate in a New Democratic society.

In the context of culture, Mao defined New Democracy as "national, scientific, and mass culture" which would selectively integrate Western aspects into the Chinese context and elevate peasant culture with science, technology, and socialism.

== Effects of establishment ==
By the latter Chinese Civil War period, many Chinese capitalists had become disillusioned with Chiang Kai-shek's Nationalist government. Many left for Hong Kong, Taiwan, or the Americas, although some stayed or returned to Mao-era China in the belief that New Democracy offered them a place in revolutionary China.

Once New Democracy has been established in the way Mao's theory outlines, the country is subsequently viewed in orthodox Maoist theory to be ideologically socialist and working towards communism under the leadership of its leading communist party and its people are actively involved in the construction of socialism. Examples are the Great Leap Forward and the Cultural Revolution for what Mao viewed as the participatory democracy inherent in the New Democracy concept.

Because of New Democracy's nature as an "intermediate stage", Maoists consider it a stepping-stone to socialism—an essentially two-stage theory of first New Democracy, then socialism, given that the self-proclaimed ultimate goal of socialist construction—the creation of a stateless, classless and moneyless communist society—has not yet been reached in the period of New Democracy. Discourse of New Democracy declined after 1953 as Mao emphasized his view of China progressing to the next stage of socialism.

== Examples ==
Associated with the concept of New Democracy, democracy was first incorporated in the CCP's constitution in 1945.

The Chinese People's Political Consultative Conference (CPPCC) was the primary government body through which the CCP sought to incorporate non-CCP elements into the political system pursuant to principles of New Democracy. On September 29, 1949, the CPPCC unanimously adopted the Common Program as the basic political program for the country following the success of the Chinese Communist Revolution. The Common Program defined China as a new democratic country which would practice a people's democratic dictatorship led by the proletariat and based on an alliance of workers and peasants which would unite all of China's democratic classes (defined as those opposing imperialism, feudalism, and bureaucratic capitalism and favoring an independent China). Per the Common Program, Chinese students were required to participate in a nationwide study movement on political history and concepts, including new democracy.

As part of the New Democracy in the early PRC, the industrial economy included multiple forms of ownership, including private ownership and foreign private ownership, in addition to state ownership.

During the 1946–1951 Telangana uprising in India, communists in the movement used the model of New Democracy and envisioned a two-stage revolution.

== Comparisons with core Marxism ==
The classical Marxist understanding of the stages of economic and historical development of the modes of production under which a socialist revolution can take place is that the socialist revolution occurs only after the capitalist bourgeois-democratic revolution happens first. According to this, the bourgeois-democratic revolution paves the way for the industrial proletarian class to emerge as the majority class in society, after which it then overthrows capitalism and begins constructing socialism. Mao disagreed and said that the bourgeois-democratic revolution and the socialist revolution could be combined into a single stage, rather than two separate back-to-back stages. He called this stage New Democracy.

Marx himself is often misunderstood on this topic as he did not postulate that strictly only after a bourgeois society has formed, a socialist revolution would become possible. Instead, most notably in a letter to Vera Zasulich, Marx suggested a form of revolutionary change in Russia at the time that is very much akin to Mao's thesis of New Democracy:

In dealing with the genesis of capitalist production I stated that it is founded on "the complete separation of the producer from the means of production" (p. 315, column 1, French edition of Capital) and that "the basis of this whole development is the expropriation of the agricultural producer. To date this has not been accomplished in a radical fashion anywhere except in England... But all the other countries of Western Europe are undergoing the same process" (1.c., column II).

I thus expressly limited the "historical inevitability" of this process to the countries of Western Europe. And why? Be so kind as to compare Chapter XXXII, where it says:

The "process of elimination transforming individualised and scattered means of production into socially concentrated means of production, of the pigmy property of the many into the huge property of the few, this painful and fearful expropriation of the working people, forms the origin, the genesis of capital... Private property, based on personal labour [...] will be supplanted by capitalist private property, based on the exploitation of the labour of others, on wage labour" (p. 341, column II).

Thus, in the final analysis, it is a question of the transformation of one form of private property into another form of private property. Since the land in the hands of the Russian peasants has never been their private property, how could this development be applicable?

— Karl Marx, First Draft of Letter To Vera Zasulich, 1881

The class coalition of New Democracy is similar to the view of Vladimir Lenin, who had broken with the Mensheviks over the idea that the working class could organize and lead the democratic revolution in an underdeveloped country like Russia where the objective conditions for socialism did not yet exist. Nonetheless, the Chinese experience contrasts with the Bolshevik Revolution because it included, rather than targeted, the national bourgeoisie (the bourgeois class of a semi-colonial country).

== See also ==
- Maoism
- Marxism
- New Three Principles of the People
- People's War
- Permanent revolution
- Theory of the productive forces
- Soviet democracy
