= Dong Yinchu =

Chinese politician

- 董寅初

Vice Chairman of the Chinese People's Political Consultative Conference
- In office 27 March 1993 – 13 March 1998
- Chairman: Li Ruihuan

Chairman of China Zhi Gong Party
- In office April 1988 – December 1997
- Preceded by: Huang Dingchen
- Succeeded by: Luo Haocai

Personal details
- Born: September 20, 1915
- Died: June 23, 2009 (aged 93) Shanghai
- Party: China Zhi Gong Party
- Education: National Chiao Tung University, Shanghai

Dong Yinchu (Chinese: 董寅初; September 20, 1915 – June 23, 2009) was a Chinese male politician, who served as the vice chairperson of the Chinese People's Political Consultative Conference.

== Life ==
Dong Yinchu grew up in Suzhou, Jiangsu Province and attended the affiliated high school of Soochow University and the affiliated high school of Kwang Hua University. He continued his studies at Shanghai Jiao Tong University and graduated in 1938. He then worked as a translator and editor for Shun Pao in Hong Kong before moving to Indonesia in 1939. There he worked for local Chinese newspaper Tian Sheng Daily before founding Zhao Bao and being its manager and editor-in-chief.

On his newspaper Dong wrote a large number of articles on anti-Japanese salvation, which played an active role in awakening the overseas Chinese. He was arrested and imprisoned by the Japanese occupation forces in December 1942, and regained his freedom in September 1945 due to the surrender of Japan. In 1947 he returned to Shanghai and was the general manager of the local branch of Kian Gwan, the largest trading company then in Southeast Asia.

After the founding of the People's Republic of China in 1949, he became deputy director general of the Shanghai Joint State-Private Company for Foreign Trade. Since 1951, he has been elected as a member of the Shanghai Municipal People's Congress and of the CPPCC Shanghai Committee for several terms. After the Cultural Revolution, he's been vice-chairman then chairman of Shanghai Federation of Returned Overseas Chinese.

Dong Yinchu joined China Zhi Gong Party in 1980. In April 1988, he replaced Huang Dingchen as chairman of the Zhi Gong Party and held this position until December 1997. In 1993, he was appointed vice-chairman of CPPCC and held this office until 1998. In December 1997, he was also made honorary chairman of the Zhi Gong Party and held this position until his death on June 23, 2009.
