= Zhu Yunshan =

Chinese politician

- 朱蕴山
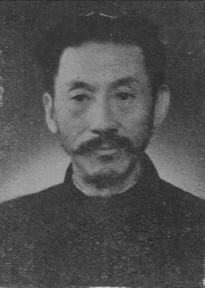

Vice Chairman of the Chinese People's Political Consultative Conference
- In office March 8, 1978 – April 30, 1981
- Chairman: Deng Xiaoping

Vice Chairman of the Standing Committee of the National People's Congress
- In office July 1, 1979 – April 30, 1981
- Chairman: Ye Jianying

Chairman of Revolutionary Committee of the Chinese Kuomintang
- In office October 1979 – April 30, 1981
- Preceded by: He Xiangning
- Succeeded by: Wang Kunlun

Personal details
- Born: November 3, 1887
- Died: April 30, 1981 (aged 93)
- Party: Revolutionary Committee of the Chinese Kuomintang (since 1948)
- Other political affiliations: Chinese Communist Party (1925–1927)

Zhu Yunshan (Chinese: 朱蕴山; November 3, 1887 – April 30, 1981) was a Chinese male politician, who served as the vice chairperson of the Chinese People's Political Consultative Conference.
