= Qu Wu =

Chinese politician

- 屈武
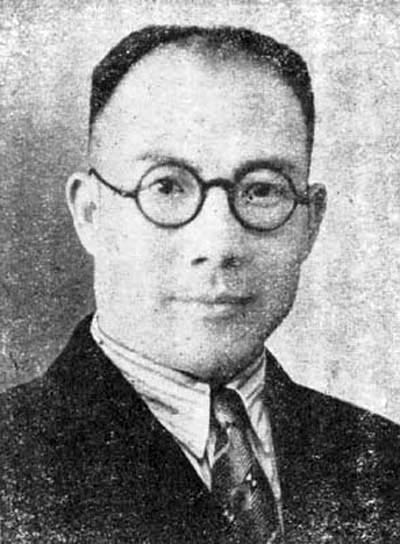

Vice Chairman of the Chinese People's Political Consultative Conference
- In office 17 June 1983 – 27 March 1993
- Chairperson: Deng Yingchao; Li Xiannian

Chairman of Revolutionary Committee of the Chinese Kuomintang
- In office September 1985 – December 1987
- Preceded by: Wang Kunlun
- Succeeded by: Zhu Xuefan

Personal details
- Born: July 16, 1898 Weinan, Shaanxi, China
- Died: June 13, 1992 (aged 93) Beijing, China
- Party: Revolutionary Committee of the Chinese Kuomintang (since 1952)
- Other political affiliations: Kuomintang (1919–1949); Chinese Communist Party (since 1950)
- Relatives: Yu Youren (father-in-law)

Qu Wu (Chinese: 屈武; July 16, 1898 – June 13, 1992) was a Chinese military officer and politician, who most notably served as chairman of the Revolutionary Committee of the Chinese Kuomintang, Vice Chairman of the Chinese People's Political Consultative Conference, deputy secretary-general of the National People's Congress, deputy secretary-general of the Central People's Government and vice chairman of the Committee of Foreign Cultural Relations.

A graduate of Peking University, Moscow Sun Yat-sen University and the Frunze Military Academy, Qu was a left-wing nationalist; he joined the Kuomintang and married a daughter of Yu Youren, but strongly supported collaboration with the Communists against Japan and aggressive nationalizations of foreign-owned businesses. In 1949, as the Nationalist-appointed Mayor of Ürümqi, he played a leading role in the mostly peaceful incorporation of Xinjiang into the People's Republic of China.

== Life ==
Qu was born on July 16, 1898, in Weinan, Shaanxi. In 1911, the Xinhai Revolution broke out. Qu Wu, who was only 13 years old, also joined the ranks of the insurgents.

In February 1914, Qu Wu went to Huashan Academy to study. Huashan Academy was founded by Guo Xiren, Liu Airu, and Cao Yinhou, who were known as the "Three Masters of Guanzhong" during the Revolution of 1911. Qu Wu begged Guo Xiren to take him in, and Guo Xiren agreed to subsidize him to complete his studies there. Qu Wu then studied political science at Peking University, where he was also a leader of the student movement at the Peking University Student Union. In 1919 he became a member of the Kuomintang (KMT) and in April 1922 he married Yu Zhixiu, the eldest daughter of Yu Youren.

During the first collaboration between the KMT and the Chinese Communist Party, Qu Wu was one of the students sent to study in the Soviet Union, and he graduated from both Moscow Sun Yat-sen University and later the Frunze Military Academy. In 1927 the partnership between Nationalists and Communists collapsed because of the Shanghai Massacre; Qu Wu did not approve of the actions of Chiang Kai-shek and he decided to remain in the Soviet Union. However, in 1930 he was suspected of being a spy for Japan, and he was sent to a Gulag in Murmansk, where he spent seven years. He was released in 1937 and immediately volunteered to serve in China, after Japan invaded. His request was approved and he returned to China in 1938, arriving in Chongqing, where he lived in Yu Youren's home. Despite his hardships in Murmansk, Qu remained very friendly towards the Soviet Union.

In January 1939, the Southern Bureau of the Central Committee of the Chinese Communist Party was established in Chongqing, with Zhou Enlai as its head. Qu Wu saw the news at "Xinhua Daily" and decided to go to Zhou Enlai. Qu Wu said to Zhou that he, like Liu Bocheng and Zuo Quan, had studied military affairs in the Soviet Union. Zhou Enlai persuaded Qu Wu to stay outside the Chinese Communist Party and instead engage in united front work.

Soon, Qu Wu was appointed the Chief of the Military Advisory Affairs Office of the Nationalist Government Military Affairs Commission and a major general in charge of military liaison with the Soviet Union. Since then, Qu Wu was elected to the KMT Legislative Yuan, and served as the Secretary-General of the Sino-Soviet Cultural Association. Entrusted by Zhou Enlai, Qu Wu introduced the current situation to Yu Youren, which made Yu Youren do a lot of work to safeguard the anti-Japanese national united front in the many conflicts between the Kuomintang and the Communist Party after 1939.

After the Southern Anhui Incident, according to Zhou Enlai's instructions, Qu Wu, Wang Kunlun, Xu Baoju, Wang Bingnan and others initiated and established the China Democratic Revolution League (also known as the "Little Revolution") in the summer of 1941. This League was a satellite organization directly led by the Southern Bureau of the Central Committee of the Chinese Communist Party.

In June 1941, the Soviet-German War broke out. Qu Wu gave many speeches and wrote articles analyzing the situation of the Soviet-German war, and was hailed as the "authority for judging the Soviet-German war." In February 1944, a part of General Qu's speeches and articles were compiled into a book "On the Soviet-German War", which was published in Chongqing. This is the only publicly available military work of Qu Wu.

In March 1944, Chiang Kai-shek suddenly summoned Qu Wu and ordered him to assume the office of Director of the Shaanxi Provincial Construction Department. When Qu Wu tried to protest, Chiang Kai-shek immediately banged the table and said: "This is an order!" Qu Wu did not want to leave Chongqing, so he asked his friend Chiang Ching-kuo to help him. Ching-kuo advised him to go Shaanxi temporarily, and explained that his father had received reports that Qu Wu had illegal contact with Soviet military attachés and "suspicious communications" with Communists. Qu Wu had to leave Chongqing for Xi'an, Shaanxi, and became a member of the Shaanxi Provincial Government and Director of the Construction Department of Shaanxi Province.

In August 1945, the war against Japan ended in victory. Mao Zedong was invited by Chiang to Chongqing for lengthy negotiations. On the afternoon of August 31, Mao Zedong had a discussion with the leaders of the Chinese Democratic Revolutionary League. Qu Wu participated in that meeting and had a long talk with Mao Zedong.

From 1946 to 1949, Qu Wu served as the mayor of Dihua (Ürümqi) in Xinjiang, appointed by Chiang Kai-shek, and was the last Mayor of Dihua in the Republic of China, before peacefully surrendering the city to the Communists, with whom he had long been in secret contact and understanding.

In December 1949, the Xinjiang Provincial People's Government of the People's Republic of China was established. Qu Wu served as a member of the Xinjiang Provincial People's Government and the Mayor of Dihua Municipal People's Government. He was also appointed a member of the Northwest China Military and Political Committee.

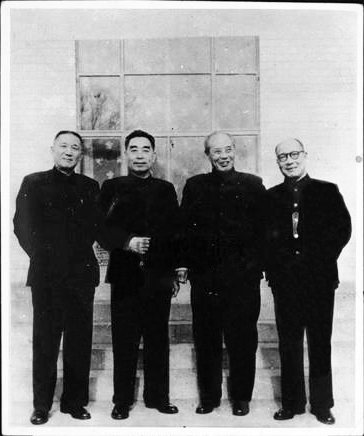
In 1962, from left to right: Zhang Zhizhong, Zhou Enlai, Fu Zuoyi and Qu Wu

In March 1950, Qu Wu was transferred to Beijing. From 1950 to the onset of the Cultural Revolution in 1966, Qu went on to serve as Deputy Secretary-General of the Central People's Government, Deputy Secretary-General of the National People's Congress, and vice chairman of the Committee for Foreign Cultural Relations. In the latter capacity, Qu Wu led many delegations abroad, visiting Switzerland, the United Kingdom, Czechoslovakia, Poland, Mongolia, Afghanistan, Sudan, Ethiopia, Guinea, Morocco and Hungary.

In 1952, Qu Wu joined the Central Committee of the Revolutionary Committee of the Chinese Kuomintang.

In June 1966, the Cultural Revolution broke out. Qu Wu immediately became a target of criticism by the Red Guards. Qu Wu resolutely denied the charges and was thus identified as a "stubborn reactionary" and suffered a lot of torture. On August 30, 1968, Qu Wu was thrown into Qincheng Prison for "counter-revolutionary crimes." While in custody, Qu Wu's wife Yu Zhixiu and mother-in-law Gao Zhonglin were "persecuted to death".

In 1972, Zhou Enlai sent someone to inquire about Qu Wu's condition in prison. Qu Wu wrote a letter to Zhou Enlai, asking Zhou Enlai to rescue him and the other detainees. After Zhou Enlai saw the letter, he immediately summoned the person in charge of the special case team and asked him for what crime was Qu being detained and what evidence was there. The person in charge of the task force stated that Qu was detained for "counter-revolutionary crimes," and no evidence had been found so far. Zhou Enlai said: "Since this person has been investigated for four years and no evidence of counter-revolutionary crimes has been found, he should be released". The task force personnel turned to Jiang Qing for instructions, and Jiang Qing ordered "continue detention."

On September 29, 1974, on the eve of the 25th anniversary of the National Day of the People's Republic of China, Zhou Enlai specifically included Qu Wu in the list of official guests and sent it to Mao Zedong for approval. Mao approved, and Qu Wu went directly from the prison to a state banquet, ending 6 years and 1 month of prison life.

After being released from prison, Qu Wu participated in the activities of the Revolutionary Committee of the Chinese Kuomintang. During the Cultural Revolution, the RCCK organization was severely damaged, and many leaders were persecuted to death. After the Cultural Revolution, it urgently needed to be rebuilt. In December 1977, the Provisional Leading Group of the Central Committee of the RCCK was established, with Qu Wu as one of the leading members. In October 1979, the Fifth National Congress of the RCCK was held, and Qu Wu was elected as the vice chairman. In 1981, Qu Wu served as the Executive Vice Chairman of the RCCK. From 1981 to 1985, Chairman Wang Kunlun delegated most tasks to Qu Wu.

In June 1983, Qu Wu was elected as the Vice Chairman of the Chinese People's Political Consultative Conference. On August 23, 1985, Wang Kunlun died; in September 1985, the Standing Committee of the RCCK elected Qu Wu as Acting Chairman. In February 1987, at the Second Plenary Session of the Sixth Central Committee of the RCCK, Qu Wu was elected as the Chairman of the RCCK. At that time, Qu Wu was already 90 years old, and at the Fifth Plenary Session of the Sixth Central Committee in December 1987, he formally resigned as chairman. On January 1, 1988, Qu Wu was promoted to honorary chairman of the RCCK.

Qu Wu was a representative of the first, second and fifth National People's Congress, a member of the Standing Committee of the third, fourth, and fifth CPPCC National Committees, and vice chairman of the sixth and seventh CPPCC National Committees. Member of the Standing Committee of the 3rd and 4th Central Committee of the Revolutionary Committee of the Chinese Kuomintang, vice chairman of the 5th Central Committee, vice chairman, acting chairman and chairman of the 6th Central Committee, honorary chairman of the 7th Central Committee of the RCCK. In 1984, Qu Wu became the president of the Sino-Soviet Friendship Association. He was also an honorary consultant of the Sun Yat-sen Research Association.

On January 13, 1988, Chiang Ching-kuo died in Taipei. The next day, Qu Wu sent a telegram of condolences to his widow Jiang Fangliang, expressing his condolences to Chiang Ching-kuo.

On June 13, 1992, Qu Wu died in Beijing at the age of 94.
