= New Three Principles of the People =

Reinterpretation of Sun Yat-sen's ideology by the Chinese Communist Party

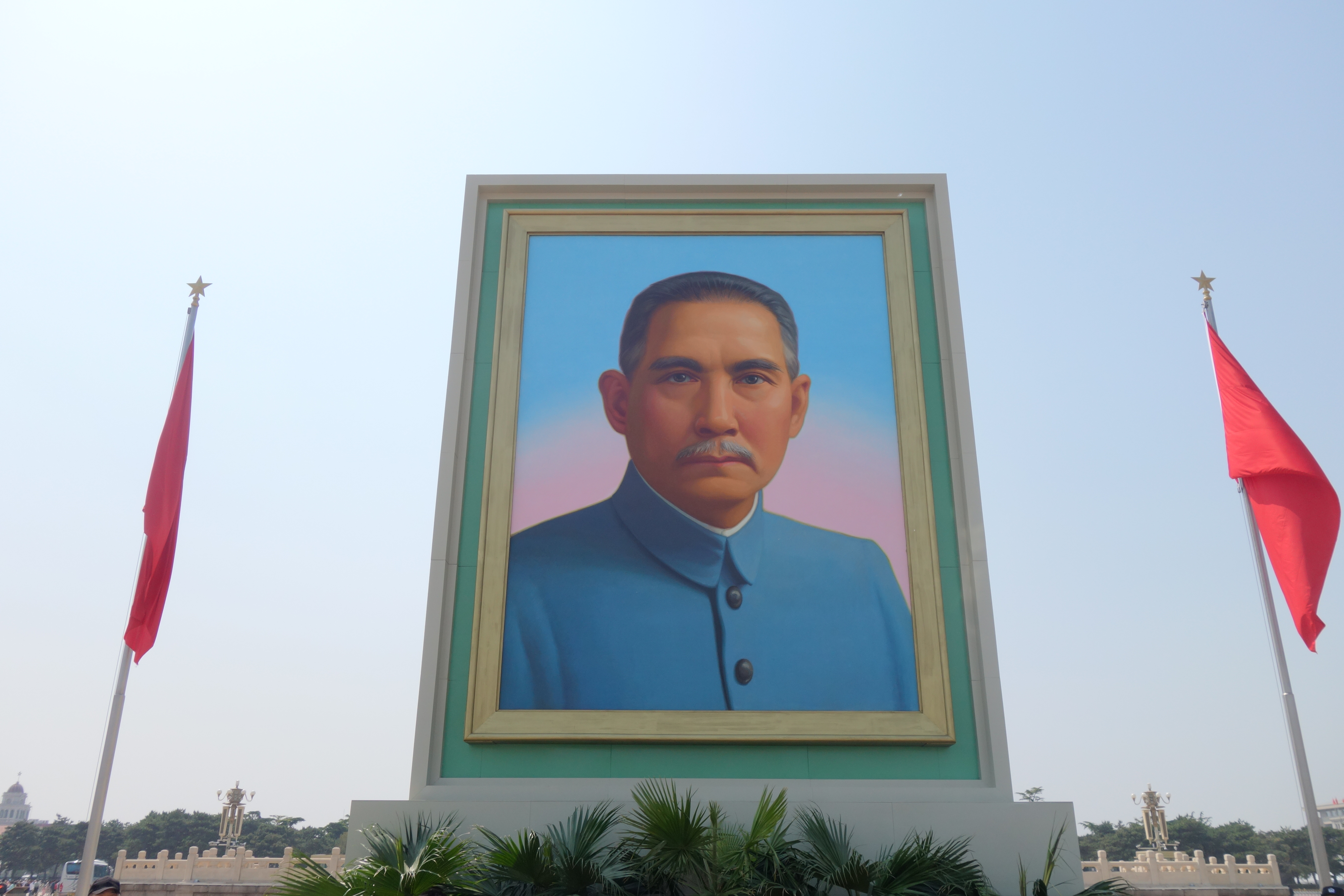
Sun Yat-sen tribute in Tiananmen Square in front of the Monument to the People's Heroes, 2021

The New Three Principles of the People (Chinese: 新三民主义; pinyin: Xīn Sānmín Zhǔyì) refers to a reinterpretation of Sun Yat-sen's "Principles of the Kuomintang" (as outlined in the Declaration of the First National Congress of the Chinese Kuomintang) by the Chinese Communist Party (CCP), led by Mao Zedong. This concept was introduced to distinguish the revolutionary theory of the First United Front period from the original "Three Principles of the People" prior to the Northern Expedition. However, high-ranking officials of the Kuomintang (KMT), including Chiang Kai-shek, explicitly opposed the division of the Three Principles into "Old" and "New" versions.

According to the CCP's interpretation of Sun Yat-sen's speech during the congress, the specific content of the New Three Principles of the People consists of:

1. Nationalism (Minzu): A united nationalism that opposes imperialism, feudalism, and warlord interference, seeking the complete liberation of the nation through the Northern Expedition.
2. Democracy (Minquan): An advanced form of democracy that utilizes the experience and assistance of the October Revolution to establish a National Revolutionary Army. Through the "Three Great Policies" (Alliance with Russia, alliance with the CCP, and support for workers and peasants), it aimed to sweep away warlords, establish constitutionalism, and pursue equality for all classes, ensuring that the right to vote is not monopolized by the bourgeoisie.
3. Livelihood (Minsheng): The establishment of socialism by supporting the working class and peasantry. This involves the equalization of land rights , regulation of capital, and the "Land to the Tiller" program, alongside the creation of state-owned enterprises to elevate the status of workers and peasants in political participation.

The CCP argues that the New Three Principles were a reinterpretation based on the "Three Great Policies" (Alliance with the Soviet Union, Alliance with the CCP, and Assistance to Peasants and Workers) established by Sun Yat-sen in collaboration with Soviet envoy Mikhail Borodin. In his 1940 work On New Democracy, Mao Zedong stated: "Sun Yat-sen reinterpreted the Three Principles of the People in the Manifesto of the First National Congress of the Kuomintang in January 1924... the Three Principles of the People in the new period of revolution are the Three Principles of the Three Great Policies." The CCP considers the New Three Principles as the fundamental basis for the KMT-CCP cooperation. In his book China's Destiny (中國之命運), Chiang Kai-shek refuted the CCP's division of the Principles into "Old" and "New."

== Historical background ==
At the time, Sun Yat-sen's revolutionary activities lacked the international support they once received from capitalist nations. Following the Chen Jiongming incident, Sun was in urgent need of external assistance. Simultaneously, the Soviet Union was internationally isolated after the communist revolution and was seeking a diplomatic breakthrough. Finding that other warlords such as Wu Peifu and Zhang Zuolin refused to cooperate, the Soviets turned to Sun Yat-sen. A cooperation agreement was proposed, which required Sun to accept the Chinese Communist Party. Sun agreed to this principle, believing he could maintain control over the situation.

In his 1924 lectures on the Three Principles of the People, Sun stated: "The Principle of Livelihood is socialism, also known as communism; it is the Great Harmony (Datong)."

The "Three Great Policies" were first proposed by Mikhail Borodin. Subsequently, a special meeting of the CCP Central Committee formalized the alliance with Russia, the admission of communists into the KMT, and assistance to peasants and workers as the Three Great Policies. During the Wuhan Plenum in March 1927, Borodin and the CCP initiated a move against Chiang Kai-shek, using the slogan "Enhance party power" to strip Chiang of his chairmanship during the Northern Expedition.

=== Mao Zedong's interpretation ===
On January 9, 1940, Mao Zedong delivered a speech titled "Politics and Culture of New Democracy" (later retitled On New Democracy). Mao argued: "The revolutionary Three Principles of the People of the new period, the New Three Principles or Genuine Three Principles, are those of the Three Great Policies... Without the Three Great Policies, it is a pseudo-Three Principles." Mao believed that the leadership of the Chinese revolution would inevitably pass from the national bourgeoisie (KMT) to the proletariat (CCP).

1. Nationalism: While the "Old" nationalism focused on "Anti-Qing" Han chauvinism, the "New" nationalism emphasized opposition to imperialism.
2. Democracy: It shifted from abstract notions of "Liberty, Equality, and Fraternity" to advocating for universal and equal civil rights.
3. Livelihood: Moving beyond the mere "equalization of land rights," it introduced methods for the regulation of capital and recognized the "Land to the Tiller" policy to improve the lives of workers and peasants.

== Controversies ==
The Kuomintang has consistently denied the existence of the "New Three Principles" as a distinct concept. No records of this term exist in KMT archives, and Sun Yat-sen's final lectures before his death made no mention of "New" Three Principles. The CCP explains this by stating that Sun's 1924 reinterpretation served as the political foundation for the First United Front. Thus, the CCP often refers to it as "Revolutionary Three Principles" or "New Democratic Three Principles."

Modern Chinese historian Jin Chongji , in discussions with Taiwanese historian Chiang Yung-ching, acknowledged that while the "Three Great Policies" were not explicitly formulated by Sun in 1924, Sun did adopt those practices in his actual political work.

== Criticism ==
The Republic of China (ROC) maintains that the "Three Great Policies" and the "New Three Principles" were not authored by Sun Yat-sen but were unilateral reinterpretations by the Soviet Union and the CCP that do not conform to historical facts. Historians such as Li Yun-han (李雲漢) argue that the CCP attempted to replace the Three Principles with the Three Great Policies as a tactical deception orchestrated by Borodin. Chiang Yung-ching noted that Chen Duxiu was the first to deliberately conflate the two, while Mao Zedong's subsequent adoption of the term "New Three Principles" was a further ideological appropriation.

== Modern interpretations ==
In 2003, CCP General Secretary Hu Jintao proposed a "New Three Principles of the People" focused on governance: "Power is used for the people; affection is tied to the people; and benefits are sought for the people."

During his tenure as Mayor of Taipei, Ko Wen-je proposed his own version: "Plebeianism (庶民主義), Villager-ism (鄉民主義), and Citizen-ism (公民主義)."

== See also ==
- First United Front
- Revolutionary Committee of the Chinese Kuomintang
