= Hu Juewen =

Chinese politician

Hu Juewen

Hu Juewen (Chinese: 胡厥文; October 7, 1895 – April 16, 1989) was a Chinese politician, who served as the vice chairperson of the Standing Committee of the National People's Congress.
