= Li Jishen =

Chinese politician

- 李济深
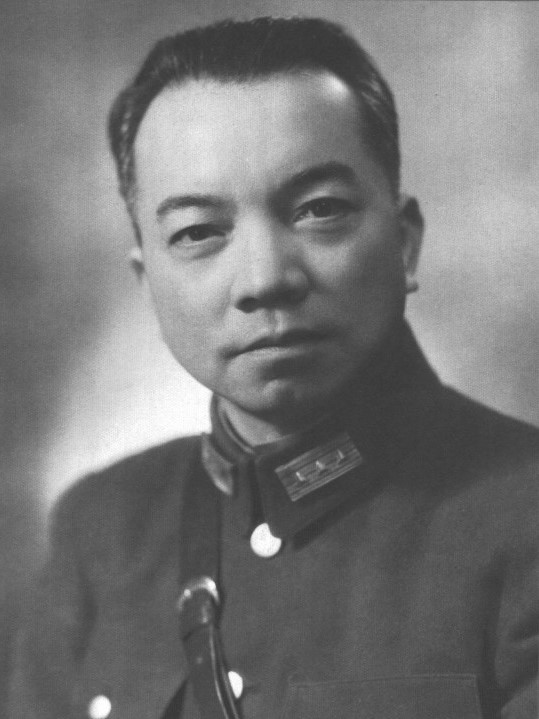

Vice Chairman of the Central People's Government
- In office 8 October 1949 – 9 October 1959
- Leader: Mao Zedong

Vice Chairman of the Chinese People's Political Consultative Conference
- In office October 1949 – 9 October 1959
- Chairman: Mao Zedong; Zhou Enlai

Vice Chairman of the Standing Committee of the National People's Congress
- In office 27 September 1954 – 9 October 1959
- Chairman: Liu Shaoqi; Zhu De

Chairman of Revolutionary Committee of the Chinese Kuomintang
- In office 1 January 1948 – 9 October 1959
- Succeeded by: He Xiangning

Chairman of China Zhi Gong Party
- In office May 1947 – April 1950
- Preceded by: Chen Jiongming
- Succeeded by: Chen Qiyou

Personal details
- Born: 5 November 1885 Cangwu, Guangxi
- Died: 9 October 1959 (aged 73) Beijing
- Party: Revolutionary Committee of the Chinese Kuomintang
- Other political affiliations: Chinese Kuomintang; China Zhi Gong Party
- Children: Li Peiyao (son)

Li Jishen
- Traditional Chinese: 李濟深
- Simplified Chinese: 李济深
Transcriptions
Standard Mandarin
- Hanyu Pinyin: Lǐ Jìshēn
- Wade–Giles: Li^{3} Chi^{4}-shên^{1}
Yue: Cantonese
- Jyutping: Lei5 Zai3 Sam1

Li Jishen (simplified Chinese: 李济深; traditional Chinese: 李濟深; Wade–Giles: Li Chi-shen; 5 November 1885 – 9 October 1959) was a Chinese military officer and politician, general of the National Revolutionary Army of the Republic of China, Vice President of the People's Republic of China (1949–1954), Vice Chairman of the National People's Congress (1954–1959), Vice Chairman the Chinese People's Political Consultative Conference (1949–1959) and founder and first Chairman of the Revolutionary Committee of the Kuomintang (1948–1959).

Initially a supporter of Chiang Kai-shek and Kuomintang, Li Jishen helped purge and execute Communists in the 1927 Shanghai massacre, but eventually became one of Chiang's top internal rivals. Li accused Chiang of weakness in the face of Japanese aggression and of submission to Western financial interests. The two eventually reached an understanding, and Li went on to hold military commands during the Second Sino–Japanese War. However, after the end of the war, new disagreements with Chiang led to Li's expulsion from the Kuomintang. After this, for a time, he became leader of the splinter Revolutionary Committee of the Kuomintang (RCCK), then switched sides and joined the Communists, collaborating with Mao Zedong and holding political office in the new People's Republic of China.

Li married several times and fathered many children. One of his sons, Li Peiyao, also served as Chairman of the RCCK.

== Early life ==
Li was born in Cangwu County, Wuzhou, Guangxi, in 1886. His family owned land, and some of his ancestors were Confucian scholars. His mother died when he was four years old. Li enrolled at Wuzhou Middle School, where he studied under the right wing Kuomintang leader Hu Hanmin. In 1904 he entered the Liangguang Accelerated Army Academy of the Qing Imperial Army in Guangdong. After graduation three years later, he was selected for advanced study at the Beiyang Army Officers Academy in Beijing (which later became the Baoding Military Academy). He interrupted his studies after the Wuchang revolt of October 1911 to serve as chief of staff of the 22nd Division of the revolutionary army in Jiangsu. After the establishment of the Republic of China, Li completed his education and remained at the Beijing academy, now called the Military Staff College, this time as an instructor.

== Military career and Kuomintang ==
Li returned to Guangdong in 1921 at the invitation of Guangdong Army chief of staff Deng Keng (邓铿). Deng was assassinated in March 1922, and Chen Jiongming staged a coup in June of that year, which Li helped to put down. For this, he received command of the army's 1st Division.

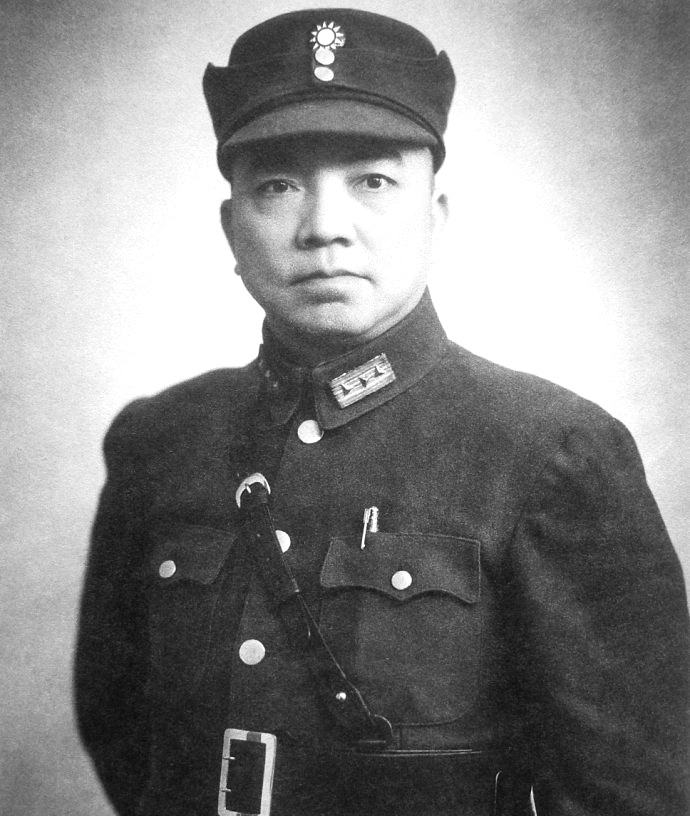
Li Jishen in uniform.

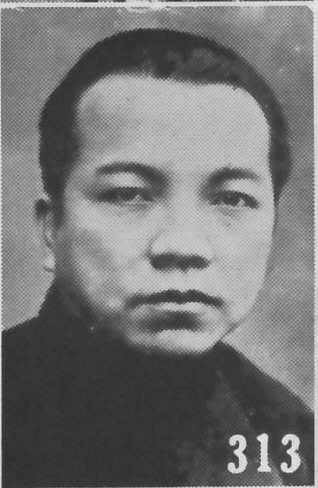
Li Jishen as pictured in The Most Recent Biographies of Chinese Dignitaries.

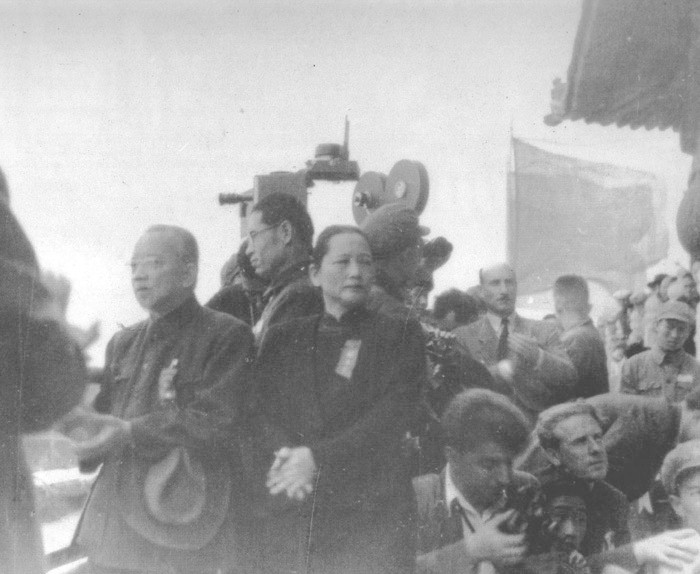
Li Jishen (left) standing next to Soong Ching-ling in the founding ceremony of the People's Republic of China on October 1, 1949.

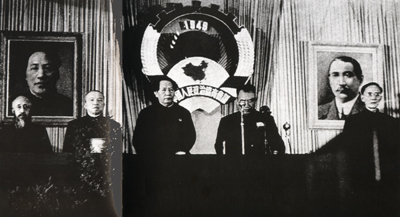
Opening ceremony of the First Plenary Session of the Chinese People's Political Consultative Conference in September 1949. Left to right: Shen Junru, Li Jishen, Mao Zedong, Zhu De, Guo Moruo.

In 1924, after serving briefly as commissioner of reconstruction of the West River-Wuzhou area and as Wuzhou garrison commander, Li became Deputy Dean of the newly established Whampoa Military Academy under Chiang Kai-shek. After Sun Yat-sen's death in March 1925, the Guangdong government was reorganized as the National Government, and Li was appointed commander of the 4th Army, which had formerly been the Guangdong Army. He spent the next year destroying Chen Jiongming's remaining power.

When the Northern Expedition began in July 1926, Li's 4th Army joined the push northward. During this time, Li also served as Governor of Guangdong, military affairs commissioner, and acting president of the Whampoa Military Academy. In 1927, he was elected to the Central Executive Committee of the Kuomintang and helped Chiang in the purge and massacre of Communists.

In November 1927, Li left Guangdong with Wang Jingwei to attend a plenary session of the Committee in Shanghai on the subject of restoring party unity. In his absence, Zhang Fakui staged a coup. However, officers loyal to Li successfully put down the coup, forcing Zhang to surrender, and Li returned to Guangdong on 4 January 1928.

On 7 February 1928, Li was made a member of the standing committee of the Military Affairs Commission. He was also made commander in chief of the newly established Eighth Route Army. On 1 March, Li became chairman of the Guangdong branch of the Political Council of the Kuomintang, and on 30 March he was made chief of the general staff of the Northern Expedition. During the remainder of the year, Li attended meetings in Beijing, and briefly served as acting commander in chief of the Nationalist forces when Chiang Kai-shek left Beijing for Nanjing. He was appointed to the State Council on 8 October and resigned as Governor of Guangdong in November.

=== Fujian People's Government ===
In 1929, Li traveled to Nanjing to attend the 3rd National Congress and mediate a dispute that had arisen between the Nationalist government and the New Guangxi clique. However, talks broke down in March, the members of the clique were expelled from the Kuomintang, and Li was placed in detention. He was not freed until after the Japanese attack on Mukden in 1931.

In 1933, Li joined forces with Chen Mingshu to launch a successful military revolt in Fujian, and after the initial seizure of power, became Chairman of the Fujian People's Government. However, in 1934, the revolt was crushed by Chiang Kai-shek, and Li was forced to flee to Hong Kong in January 1934.

=== Second Sino–Japanese War ===
In 1935, Li joined with associates to found the Chinese People's Revolutionary League, which advocated resistance against Japan and overthrow of the Nationalist government. In 1936, Li participated in a joint Guangdong-Guangxi revolt against the government, but after it collapsed, Li returned to Hong Kong. The order for his arrest was rescinded by Chiang.

In 1938, in the name of unity against the Japanese threat, Li was restored to membership in the Kuomintang, and again became a member of the Military Affairs Commission and the State Council. During the Sino-Japanese War, Li served in several military posts. In 1944, he was appointed president of the Military Advisory Council, and worked to consolidate resistance against Japan in southern Guangxi. At the 6th National Congress of the Kuomintang in May 1945, Li was elected to the Central Supervisory Committee of the Kuomintang, and served as a delegate to the National Assembly the following year.

=== Expulsion from Kuomintang and Revolutionary Committee ===
On 8 March 1947, Li issued a statement calling for reconciliation between the Kuomintang and the Chinese Communist Party. For this, Li was again expelled from the Kuomintang on Chiang's orders, for "making unwarranted statements and inciting the people to riot". Li began working to unite current and former Kuomintang members who opposed Chiang Kai-shek. This led to the formation of the Revolutionary Committee of the Kuomintang in 1948, with Li as its first chairman.

== People's Republic of China ==
Li left Hong Kong in early 1949 and traveled north to Beijing, invited by Mao Zedong, and assisted in the preparatory work for the founding of the new People's Republic of China. After the inauguration of the new Communist government, Li went on to hold important posts, serving as Vice Chairman of the People's Republic from 1949 to 1954, Vice Chairman of the National People's Congress (1954–1959), and Vice Chairman the Chinese People's Political Consultative Conference (1949–1959). He was also Vice President of the Sino-Soviet Friendship Association.

In addition to these positions, in January 1953 Li was named to the committee responsible for drafting the first Constitution of the People's Republic of China.

Li Jishen died on 9 October 1959 in Beijing due to stomach cancer and a cerebral thrombosis, at the age of 73.

== Personal life ==
Li married several times, had many mistresses, and fathered many children. One of his sons became Dean of the Agricultural College of Lingnan University during the 1940s. His second son, Li Pui Kum, went to New York and graduated from Columbia University. Another son, Li Peiyao, became Chairman of the National Revolutionary Committee of the Kuomintang in the 1990s. Three of his daughters were students at Yenching University in 1950.
