= Zheng Jianbang =

Chinese politician (born 1957)

- 郑建邦
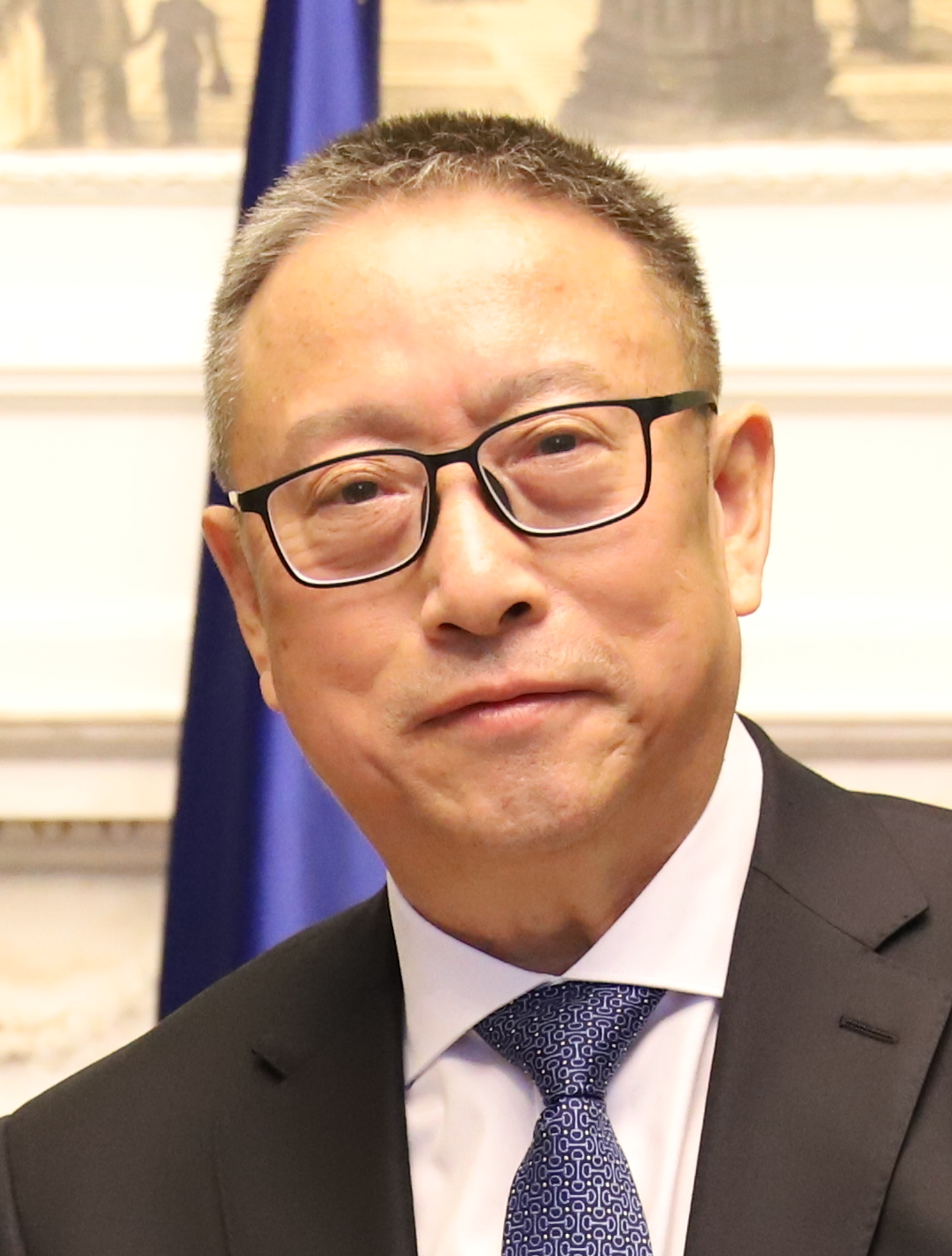

Vice Chairman of the Standing Committee of the National People's Congress
- Incumbent
- Assumed office 10 March 2023
- Chairman: Zhao Leji

Vice Chairperson of the Chinese People's Political Consultative Conference
- In office 14 March 2018 – 10 March 2023
- Chairman: Wang Yang

Chairman of the Revolutionary Committee of the Chinese Kuomintang
- Incumbent
- Assumed office 10 December 2022
- Preceded by: Wan Exiang

Personal details
- Born: January 1957 (age 69) Shimen County, Hunan, China
- Party: Revolutionary Committee of the Chinese Kuomintang
- Education: Northeast Normal University

Zheng Jianbang (Chinese: 郑建邦, born January 1957) is a Chinese politician, who is currently a vice chairperson of the Standing Committee of the National People's Congress, and the chairperson of the Revolutionary Committee of the Chinese Kuomintang (RCCK). Between 2018 and 2023, he served as a vice chairperson of the Chinese People's Political Consultative Conference.

He is the grandson of General Zheng Dongguo.

== Biography ==
=== RCCK Central Committee ===
In 1982, he obtained his degree from the Department of Political Education at Northeast Normal University, specializing in economics. He became a member of the Revolutionary Committee of the Chinese Kuomintang and held various positions, including cadre, chief clerk, and deputy director of the Publicity Department of the RCCK Central Committee, as well as deputy director, director of the second division, and deputy minister of the Liaison Department of the RCCK Central Committee. In 2000, he assumed the role of minister for the Liaison Department of the RCCK Central Committee. In 2008, he was elected as a member of the Standing Committee of the Eleventh National Committee of the CPPCC, representing the Revolutionary Committee of the Chinese National People's Party (CNDP).

=== Chinese People's Political Consultative Conference ===
In 2010, he assumed the position of full-time Vice Chairman of the Central Committee of the RCCK and Director of the Liaison Department. In 2012, he was relieved of his duties as the Director of the Liaison Department of the Central Committee of the RCCK. In 2017, he was elected as the Executive Vice Chairman of the Central Committee of the RCCK. In 2018, he was chosen as a member of the thirteenth National Committee of the Chinese People's Political Consultative Conference (CPPCC). In 2018, he was elected as the vice chairman of the CPPCC.

On 22 September 2018, at the behest of President Ibrahim Boubacar Keïta of the Republic of Mali, Zheng Jianbang travelled to Bamako, the capital, as the special envoy of President Xi Jinping to participate in President Keita's inauguration ceremony.

=== National People's Congress ===
On 10 March 2023, during the 14th National People's Congress, he was appointed Vice Chairman of the Standing Committee of the National People's Congress.

In May 2024, at the behest of President Adama Barrow of the Gambia, Zheng Jianbang traveled to the Gambia to participate in the 15th Summit of the Organisation of Islamic Cooperation (OIC) as the Special Representative of President Xi Jinping.
