= Wang Kunlun =

Chinese politician

- 王昆仑
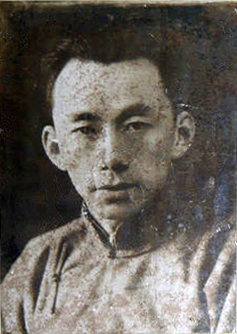
- Kunlun in 1933

Vice Chairman of the Chinese People's Political Consultative Conference
- In office July 2, 1979 – August 23, 1985
- Chairperson: Deng Xiaoping; Deng Yingchao

Chairman of Revolutionary Committee of the Chinese Kuomintang
- In office September 9, 1981 – August 23, 1985
- Preceded by: Zhu Yunshan
- Succeeded by: Qu Wu

Personal details
- Born: August 1, 1902 Ding County, Zhili Province, Qing China (modern Dingzhou, Hebei Province)
- Died: August 23, 1985 (aged 83) Beijing, China
- Party: Revolutionary Committee of the Chinese Kuomintang (since 1949)
- Other political affiliations: Kuomintang (1922–1949); Chinese Communist Party (since 1950)

Wang Kunlun (Chinese: 王昆仑; August 1, 1902 – August 23, 1985), birth name Wang Ruyu (王汝虞), was a Chinese politician who held high-profile positions, at different times, in both the Nationalist and Communist parties. Born 1902 in Baoding, Hebei province to a wealthy household, he participated in the May Fourth Movement while studying at Peking University and became involved with Chinese revolutionaries, at one point meeting in person with Dr. Sun Yat-sen. He joined the Nationalist party as a left-leaning member and served as Chief Secretary of the Political Department of the Headquarters of the National Revolutionary Army during the Northern Expedition, but became disillusioned with Chiang Kai-shek's leadership after Chiang initiated a major crackdown against Communists in April 1927. He subsequently joined the Communist Party in secret and used his political positions within the Nationalist government to aid the Communists. He was among a group of members of the Kuomintang who broke away to form the Revolutionary Committee of the Kuomintang in 1948. He would serve various government positions after the Communist victory, including vice-mayor of Beijing and vice-chairman of the National Committee of the Chinese People's Political Consultative Conference.
