= Ji Fang =

Chinese politician

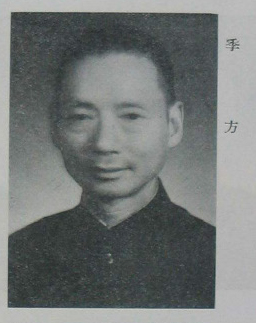
Ji Fang

Ji Fang (Chinese: 季方; April, 1890 – December 17, 1987) was a Chinese male politician, who served as the vice chairperson of the Chinese People's Political Consultative Conference.
