= Zhu Xuefan =

Chinese politician

- 朱学范
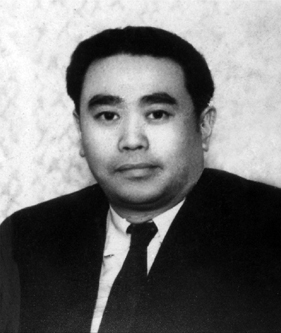

Minister of Posts and Telecommunications
- In office October 1949 – January 1975
- Succeeded by: Zhong Fuxiang

Vice Chairman of the Standing Committee of the National People's Congress
- In office 13 December 1981 – 27 March 1993
- Chairman: Ye Jianying; Peng Zhen; Wan Li

Chairman of Revolutionary Committee of the Chinese Kuomintang
- In office December 1987 – December 1992
- Preceded by: Qu Wu
- Succeeded by: Li Peiyao

Personal details
- Born: June 12, 1905 Shanghai, China
- Died: January 17, 1996 (aged 90) Beijing, China
- Party: Revolutionary Committee of the Chinese Kuomintang

Zhu Xuefan (Chinese: 朱学范; June 12, 1905 – January 17, 1996) was a Chinese politician. Zhu Xuefan served as a deputy to the First, Second, and Third National People's Congresses, a delegate to the First Plenary Session of the Chinese People's Political Consultative Conference (CPPCC), a standing committee member of the Second, Third, and Fourth CPPCC National Committees, a vice chairman of the Standing Committee of the Fifth, Sixth, and Seventh National People's Congresses, a vice chairman of the All-China Federation of Trade Unions during its Seventh, Eighth, and Ninth terms, a member of the Second Central Committee of the Revolutionary Committee of the Chinese Kuomintang (RCCK), and a standing committee member of the Third and Fourth RCCK Central Committees. Vice Chairman of the 5th and 6th Central Committees of the Revolutionary Committee of the Chinese Kuomintang, Chairman of the 7th Central Committee of the Revolutionary Committee of the Chinese Kuomintang concurrently serving as Chairman of the Central Supervisory Committee, and Honorary Chairman of the 8th Central Committee of the Revolutionary Committee of the Chinese Kuomintang. Zhu Xuefan also served as Honorary President of the Red Cross Society of China, Chairman of the China International Friendship Association, Chairman of the China Medical Foundation, Honorary Chairman of the China International Co-operative Committee, and Vice Chairman of the China International Exchange Association.
