= China Zhi Gong Party =

Minor political party in China

China Zhi Gong Party 中国致公党 Zhōngguó Zhìgōngdǎng
- Chairperson: Jiang Zuojun
- Founder: Chen Jiongming and Tang Jiyao
- Founded: 10 October 1925; 101 years ago; in San Francisco, California, U.S.
- Preceded by: Hongmen
- Headquarters: Beijing
- Newspaper: China Development; China Zhi Gong
- Membership (2022): 69,000
- Ideology: Overseas Chinese interests; Socialism with Chinese characteristics; 1925–1947: Federalism; Multi-party democracy
- Slogan: "Committed to the public" (致力为公; Zhìlì wèi gōng)
- National People's Congress (14th): 39 / 2,980
- NPC Standing Committee (14th): 3 / 175
- CPPCC National Committee (14th): 30 / 544 (Seats for political parties)

Website
- www.zg.org.cn

China Zhi Gong Party

Chinese name
- Traditional Chinese: 中國致公黨
- Simplified Chinese: 中国致公党
Transcriptions
Standard Mandarin
- Hanyu Pinyin: Zhōngguó Zhìgōngdǎng

Tibetan name
- Tibetan: ཀྲུང་གོ་ཀྲི་ཀུང་ཏང།
Transcriptions
- Wylie: krung go kri kung tang

Zhuang name
- Zhuang: Cunghgoz Ceiqgoeng Danj

Mongolian name
- Mongolian Cyrillic: Дундад улсын зии хүн даан нам
- Mongolian script: ᠳᠤᠮᠳᠠᠳᠤ ᠤᠯᠤᠰ ᠤᠨ ᡁᠢ ᠬᠦᠩ ᠳ᠋ᠠᠩ ᠨᠠᠮ

Uyghur name
- Uyghur: جۇڭگو ئادالەتچىلەر پارتىيىسى

Manchu name
- Manchu script: ᡷᡳᡳᡬᠣᠩᡩᠠᠩ
- Romanization: Zhig'ongdang

The China Zhi Gong Party is one of the eight minor non-oppositional political parties in the People's Republic of China, officially termed "democratic parties," led by the Chinese Communist Party (CCP).

The China Zhi Gong Party was founded on 10 October 1925 in San Francisco as a party advocating for federalism and multi-party democracy. In 1926, it moved its headquarters to Hong Kong and was nearly wiped out during the Japanese occupation of the city. The party later gradually moved towards the CCP, attending the first plenary session of the Chinese People's Political Consultative Conference (CPPCC). Since the 1949 proclamation of the People's Republic of China, it has functioned as one of the eight minor democratic parties led by the CCP.

The party's members are mainly returned overseas Chinese and their relatives, as well as people with overseas connections. Some scholars have described the Zhi Gong Party as "gathering non-party voices to support the party". It is the sixth-ranking minor party in China. It currently has 39 seats in the National People's Congress, three seats in the NPC Standing Committee and 30 seats in the CPPCC. Its current chairman is Jiang Zuojun.

== History ==
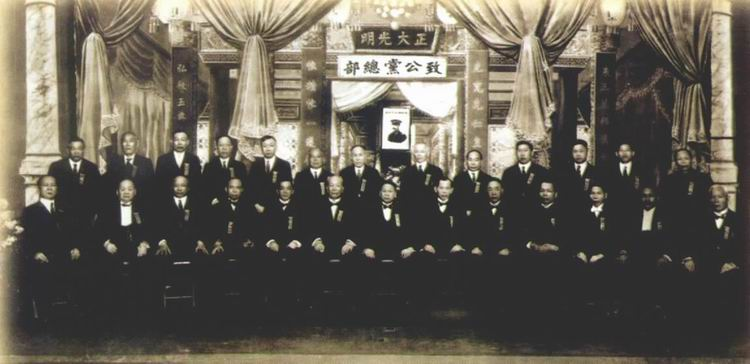
The founding congress of the China Zhi Gong Party in San Francisco in 1925.

Flag used by the China Zhi Gong Party from 1925 to 1950

The China Zhi Gong Party derives from the overseas Hung Society organisation "Hung Society Zhigong Hall" or "Chee Kung Tong", based in San Francisco, United States. This organisation was one of the key supporters of Sun Yat-sen in his revolutionary efforts to overthrow the Qing dynasty.

The party was founded on 10 October 1925 in San Francisco, and was led by Chen Jiongming and Tang Jiyao, two ex-Kuomintang warlords that went into opposition. Their first platform was federalism and multi-party democracy. The party moved its headquarters to the then-British colony of Hong Kong in 1926. After the Japanese invasion of Manchuria in 1931 it began engaging in anti-Japanese propaganda and boycotts. The party was nearly wiped out during the Japanese occupation of Hong Kong. The party turned to the left during its third party congress in 1947.

On 21 September 1949, just before the proclamation of the People's Republic of China, representatives of the CZGP attended the first plenary Session of the CPPCC at the invitation of the CCP. They participated in drawing up the Common Program and electing the Central People's Government. As part of the CCP's reorganization of the minor aligned parties, the CZGP was designated as the party of returned overseas Chinese, their relatives, and noted figures and scholars who have overseas ties.

The Zhi Gong Party is sometimes used as an intermediary for contacts with certain foreign interests. For example, when a delegation of Paraguayan politicians visited Beijing in 2001 and met Li Peng (despite Paraguay having diplomatic relations not with PRC but with ROC in Taiwan), it was invited not by the PRC government or the CCP, but by the Zhi Gong Party.

In April 2007, Wan Gang, Deputy Chair of the Zhi Gong Party Central Committee, was appointed Ministry of Science and Technology. This was the first non-CCP ministerial appointment in China in 35 years.

== Organization ==
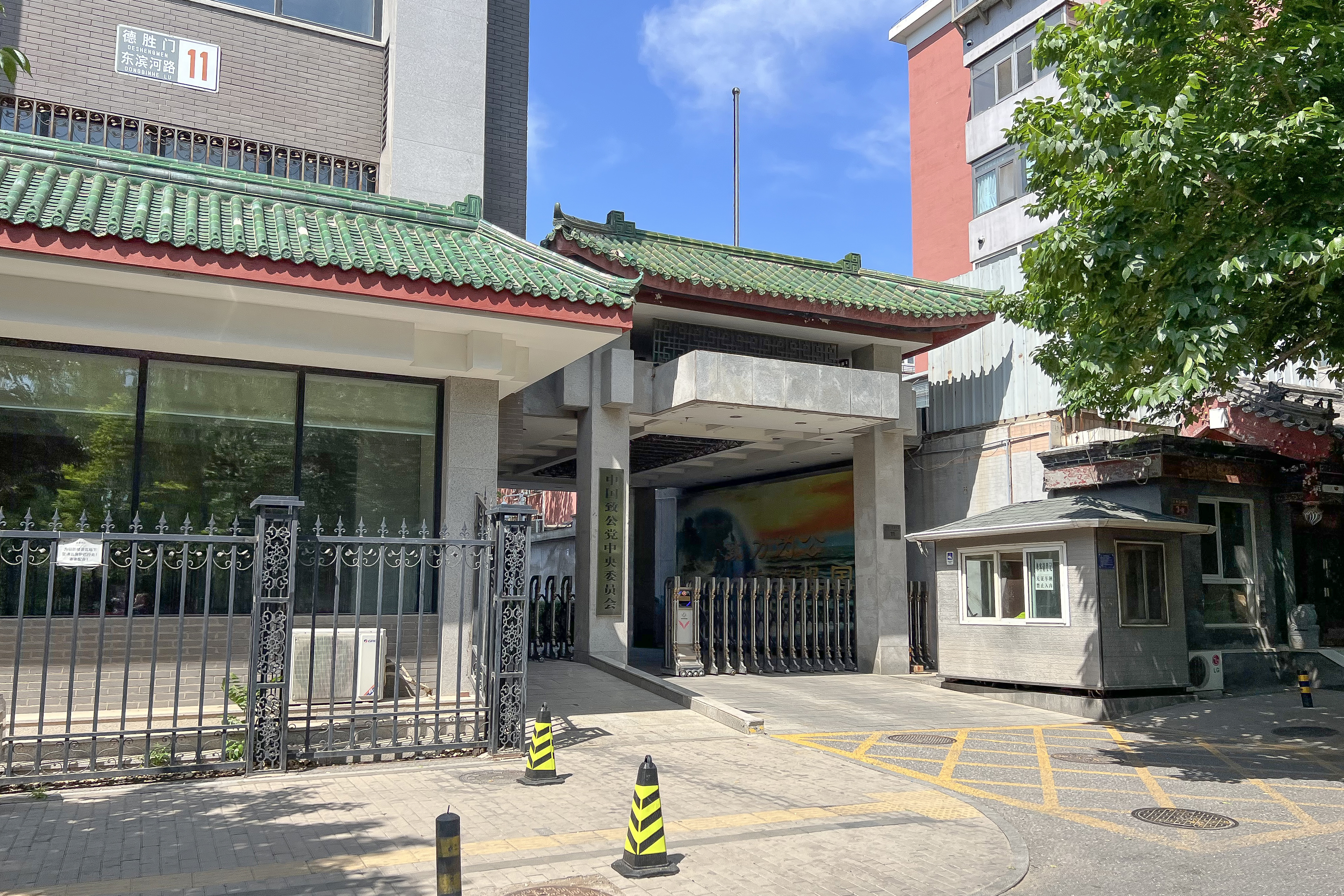
The headquarters of the Central Committee of the China Zhi Gong Party

According to its constitution, the China Zhi Gong Party is officially committed to socialism with Chinese characteristics and upholding the leadership of the CCP. It is the sixth-ranking minor democratic party in China. The party is a member of the Chinese People's Political Consultative Conference (CPPCC), a principal organisation in the CCP's united front strategy.

The highest body of the China Zhi Gong Party officially is the National Congress, which is held every five years. The 16th National Congress, held in December 2022, was the most recently held party congress. The National Congress elects the Central Committee of the China Zhi Gong Party. As of November 2022, the party has organizations in 21 province-level administrative divisions throughout China. The party publishes the newspapers China Development and China Zhi Gong.

=== Composition ===
According to the State Council Information Office, the China Zhi Gong Party is "mainly composed of the middle and higher ranks of returned overseas Chinese and their relatives, and representatives of people with overseas connections". In November 2022, the party had 69,000 members. Some scholars have described the Zhi Gong Party as "gathering non-party voices to support the party".

=== Chairpersons ===
No.	Chairperson	Took office	Left office	Ref.
1	Chen Jiongming 陈炯明	October 1925	September 1933	
2	Chen Yansheng 陈演生	1933	1947	
3	Li Jishen 李济深	May 1947	April 1950	
4	Chen Qiyou 陈其尤	April 1950	1966	
5	Huang Dingchen 黄鼎臣	October 1979	April 1988	
6	Dong Yinchu 董寅初	April 1988	November 1997	
7	Luo Haocai 罗豪才	November 1997	December 2007	
8	Wan Gang 万钢	21 December 2007	14 December 2022	
9	Jiang Zuojun 蒋作君	14 December 2022	Incumbent	

== Electoral history ==
=== National People's Congress elections ===
Election year	Number of seats
2017–18	38 / 2,970
2022–23	39 / 2,977

== See also ==
- For Public Good Party
- Guangfuhui
