= Revolutionary Committee of the Chinese Kuomintang =

Minor political party in China

Revolutionary Committee; of the Chinese Kuomintang; 中国国民党革命委员会
- Abbreviation: RCCK
- Chairman: Zheng Jianbang
- Founded: 1 January 1948; 78 years ago
- Merger of: Three Principles of the People Comrades Association; Kuomintang Democratic Promotion Association
- Split from: Kuomintang (left-wing faction)
- Headquarters: Donghuachenggen South Street; Donghuamen Subdistrict, Beijing
- Newspaper: Tuanjie Bao (Unity Daily); Tuanjie (Unity)
- Membership (2022): 158,000
- Ideology: New Three Principles of the People; Socialism with Chinese characteristics; Chinese Nationalism
- National People's Congress (14th): 41 / 2,977
- NPC Standing Committee (14th): 6 / 175
- CPPCC National Committee (14th): 65 / 544 (Seats for political parties)

Website
- www.minge.gov.cn

Revolutionary Committee of the Chinese Kuomintang

Chinese name
- Simplified Chinese: 中国国民党革命委员会
- Traditional Chinese: 中國國民黨革命委員會
- Literal meaning: "Revolutionary Committee of the Nationalist Party of China"
Transcriptions
Standard Mandarin
- Hanyu Pinyin: Zhōngguó Guómíndǎng Gémìngwěiyuánhuì
- Bopomofo: ㄓㄨㄥ ㄍㄨㄛˊ ㄍㄨㄛˊ ㄇㄧㄣˊ ㄉㄤˇ ㄍㄜˊ ㄇㄧㄥˋ ㄨㄟˇ ㄩㄢˊ ㄏㄨㄟˋ
- Wade–Giles: Chung^{1}-kuo^{2} Kuo^{2}-min^{2}-tang^{3} Ko^{2}-ming^{4}-wei^{3}-yüan^{2}-hui^{4}
- Tongyong Pinyin: Jhongguó Gúo-mín-dǎng Gé-mìng-wěi-yuán-huèi
- IPA: [ʈʂʊ́ŋ.kwǒ kwǒ.mǐn.tàŋ kɤ̌.mîŋ.wèɪ.ɥɛ̌n.xwêɪ]
Yue: Cantonese
- Jyutping: zung1 gwok3 gwok3 man4 dong2 gaak3 ming6 wai2 jyun4 wui6
- IPA: [tsʊŋ˥ kʷɔk̚˧ kʷɔk̚˧ mɐn˩ tɔŋ˧˥ kak̚˧ mɪŋ˨ wɐj˧˥ jyn˩ wuj˨]

Abbreviation
- Chinese: 民革
Transcriptions
Standard Mandarin
- Hanyu Pinyin: Mín'gé
- Wade–Giles: Minko

Tibetan name
- Tibetan: ཀྲུང་གོ་གོ་མིན་ཏང་གསར་བརྗེ་ཨུ་ཡོན་ལྷན་ཁང
Transcriptions
- Wylie: krung go go min tang gsar brje u yon lhan khang

Zhuang name
- Zhuang: Cunghgoz Gozminzdangj Gwzming Veijyenzvei

Mongolian name
- Mongolian Cyrillic: Дундад улсын гоминдангийн хувьсгалын зөвлөл
- Mongolian script: ᠳᠤᠮᠳᠠᠳᠤ; ᠤᠯᠤᠰ ᠤᠨ; ᠭᠣᠮᠢᠨᠳᠠᠩ ᠤᠨ; ᠬᠤᠪᠢᠰᠬᠠᠯ ᠤᠨ; ᠵᠥᠪᠯᠡᠯ

Uyghur name
- Uyghur: جۇڭگو گومىنداڭ ئىنقىلابىي كومىتېتى
Transcriptions
- Latin Yëziqi: Junggo gomindang inqilabiy komitéti
- Yengi Yeziⱪ: Junggo gomindang inqilabiy komitéti

Manchu name
- Manchu script: ᠮᡳᠨᡬᡝ
- Romanization: Ming'e

The Revolutionary Committee of the Chinese Kuomintang (RCCK; also commonly known, especially when referenced historically, as the Left Kuomintang or Left Guomindang), commonly abbreviated in Chinese as Minge (Chinese: 民革; pinyin: Mín'gé), is one of the eight minor non-oppositional political parties in the People's Republic of China, officially termed "democratic parties," led by the Chinese Communist Party.

The RCCK was founded in January 1948, at the height of the Chinese Civil War, by members of the left wing of the Kuomintang (KMT), especially those who were against Chiang Kai-shek's policies. The first chairman of the party was General Li Jishen, a senior Nationalist military commander who had many disputes with Chiang over the years, while Soong Ching-ling (the widow of Sun Yat-sen) was named Honorary Chairwoman. Other early leading members were Wang Kunlun, Cheng Qian, He Xiangning and Tao Zhiyue. In 1949, it merged with the Three Principles of the People Comrades Association and the Kuomintang Democratic Promotion Association. The party claims to be the true heir of Sun Yat-sen's legacy and his Three Principles of the People. In December 2022, the party had around 158,000 members. Its membership mostly consists of people with historical ties to the KMT and Taiwan. It owns a significant amount of property originally held by the KMT before the retreat of the government of the Republic of China to Taiwan.

Among the official political parties of the People's Republic of China, the Revolutionary Committee is officially ranked second after the CCP, being the first-ranking minor party. The RCCK currently has 41 seats in the National People's Congress, six seats in the NPC Standing Committee and 65 seats in the Chinese People's Political Consultative Conference. Its current chairman is Zheng Jianbang.

== History ==
After the end of World War II, the relationship between the Kuomintang and the Chinese Communist Party, who had allied to fight the Japanese, became increasingly tense; ultimately, both sides restarted the civil war, which World War II had interrupted. In 1945 and 1946, members of the Kuomintang's left formed the Three Principles of the People Comrades Association and the Kuomintang Democratic Promotion Association in Chongqing and Guangzhou, respectively. In November 1947, the first joint representative meeting of the Kuomintang left was held in Hong Kong; on 1 January 1948, the meeting announced the official establishment of the "Chinese Kuomintang Revolutionary Committee", and nominated Soong Ching-ling, the widow of Sun Yat-sen, as the Honorary Chairwoman of the Revolutionary Committee (despite Soong Ching-ling never formally joining the commission). Chairman Li Jishen, He Xiangning, and Feng Yuxiang were selected as the central leadership of the organization.

On 5 May 1948, leaders of the Revolutionary Committee of the Chinese Kuomintang, including Li Jishen and He Xiangning, together with representatives of other democratic parties and non-party figures, jointly issued a public telegram expressing their support for the call of the Chinese Communist Party and their acceptance of its leadership. This was met with a reply of welcome from Mao Zedong, Chairman of the CCP Central Committee. Subsequently, the leadership of the RCCK gradually moved north to the liberated areas of Northeast China, and after February 1949 convened in Beiping, where they took part in the preparatory work for the new Chinese People's Political Consultative Conference. In September 1949, representatives of the RCCK attended the first plenary session of the Chinese People's Political Consultative Conference, participating in the drafting of the Common Program and in the founding of the People's Republic of China.

=== People's Republic of China ===
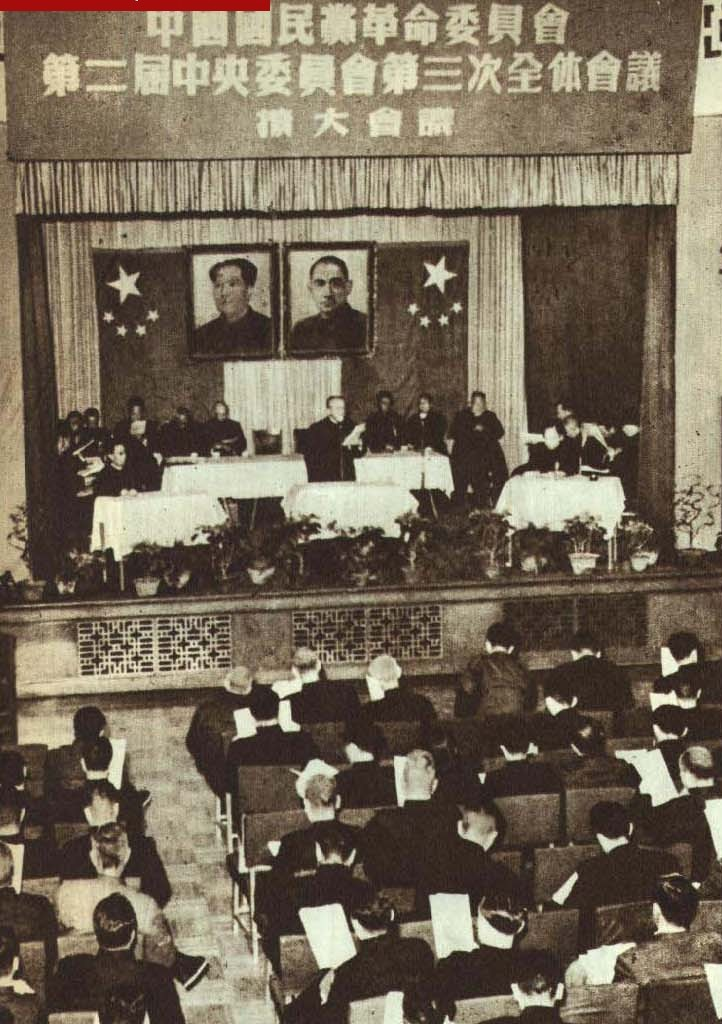
The third session of the 2nd Central Committee of the RCCK in 1953.

After the founding of the People's Republic of China on 1 October 1949, members of the Chinese Kuomintang Revolutionary Committee maintained positions in the municipal and central governments. In November 1949, the second congress of the Chinese Kuomintang Revolutionary Committee was held in Beijing. At the second congress, the Chinese Kuomintang Revolutionary Committee, the Chinese Nationalist Democratic Promotion Association, the Comrades of the Three Peoples Principles, and other members of the Kuomintang's left wing agreed to merge and form the Revolutionary Committee of the Chinese Kuomintang. The meeting also elected the 2nd Central Committee, with Li Jishen elected as chairman.

From 21 to 29 February 1956, the 3rd National Congress of the Revolutionary Committee of the Chinese Kuomintang was held in Beijing. The congress elected the 3rd Central Committee. On 5 March, the First Plenary Session of the 3rd Central Committee took place, during which Li Jishen was re-elected as chairman. From 12 November to 2 December 1958, the 4th National Congress of the Revolutionary Committee of the Chinese Kuomintang was held in Beijing. The congress elected the 4th Central Committee. On 4 December, the First Plenary Session of the 4th Central Committee was held, and Li Jishen was once again elected chairman.

From 11 to 22 October 1979, the 5th National Congress of the Revolutionary Committee of the Chinese Kuomintang was held in Beijing. The congress elected the 5th Central Committee. On 23 October, the First Plenary Session of the 5th Central Committee took place, and Zhu Yunshan was elected chairman. From 21 to 30 December 1983, the 6th National Congress of the RCCK was held in Beijing. The congress elected the 6th Central Committee. On 28 December, the First Plenary Session of the 6th Central Committee was held, and Wang Kunlun was elected chairman. From 12 to 20 November 1988, the 7th National Congress of the RCCK was held in Beijing. The congress elected the 7th Central Committee. On 19 November, the First Plenary Session of the 7th Central Committee took place, and Zhu Xuefan was elected chairman.

From 14 to 22 December 1992, the 8th National Congress of the RCCK was held in Beijing. The congress elected the 8th Central Committee. On 22 December, the First Plenary Session of the 8th Central Committee was held, and Li Peiyao was elected chairman. From 24 to 30 November 1997, the RCCK held its 50th Anniversary Commemorative Congress and the 9th National Congress in Beijing. The congress elected the 9th Central Committee. On 29 November, the First Plenary Session of the 9th Central Committee was held, and He Luli was elected chairman.

From 3 to 9 December 2002, the 10th National Congress of the RCCK was held in Beijing. The congress elected the 10th Central Committee. On 8 December, the First Plenary Session of the 10th Central Committee took place, and He Luli was re-elected chairman. From 9 to 15 December 2007, the 11th National Congress of the RCCK, coinciding with its 60th Anniversary Commemorative Congress, was held in Beijing. The congress elected the 11th Central Committee. On 14 December, the First Plenary Session of the 11th Central Committee was held, and Zhou Tienong was elected chairman.

From 12 to 18 December 2012, the 12th National Congress of the RCCK was held in Beijing. The congress elected the 12th Central Committee. On 17 December, the First Plenary Session of the 12th Central Committee took place, and Wan Exiang was elected chairman. From 20 to 24 December 2017, the 13th National Congress of the RCCK was held in Beijing. The congress elected the 13th Central Committee. On 23 December, the First Plenary Session of the 13th Central Committee was held, and Wan Exiang was re-elected chairman.

Today, the Revolutionary Committee of the Chinese Kuomintang focuses on improving relations with the Kuomintang on Taiwan, and its membership mainly consists of the descendants of Kuomintang revolutionaries. It recruits members with current ties to Taiwan who support Chinese unification.

== Organization ==
The RCCK is one of the eight minor so-called "democratic parties" led by the CCP. The highest body of the RCCK officially is the National Congress, which is held every five years. The 14th National Congress, held in December 2022, was the most recently held party congress. The National Congress elects the Central Committee of the RCCK.

According to its constitution, the RCCK is officially committed to socialism with Chinese characteristics, Chinese unification and upholding the leadership of the CCP. Among the official political parties of the PRC, the RCCK is officially ranked second after the CCP, being the first-ranking minor party. As of June 2022, the party has 30 province-level organizations, including all province-level divisions in mainland China except the Tibet Autonomous Region.

=== Central Committee ===
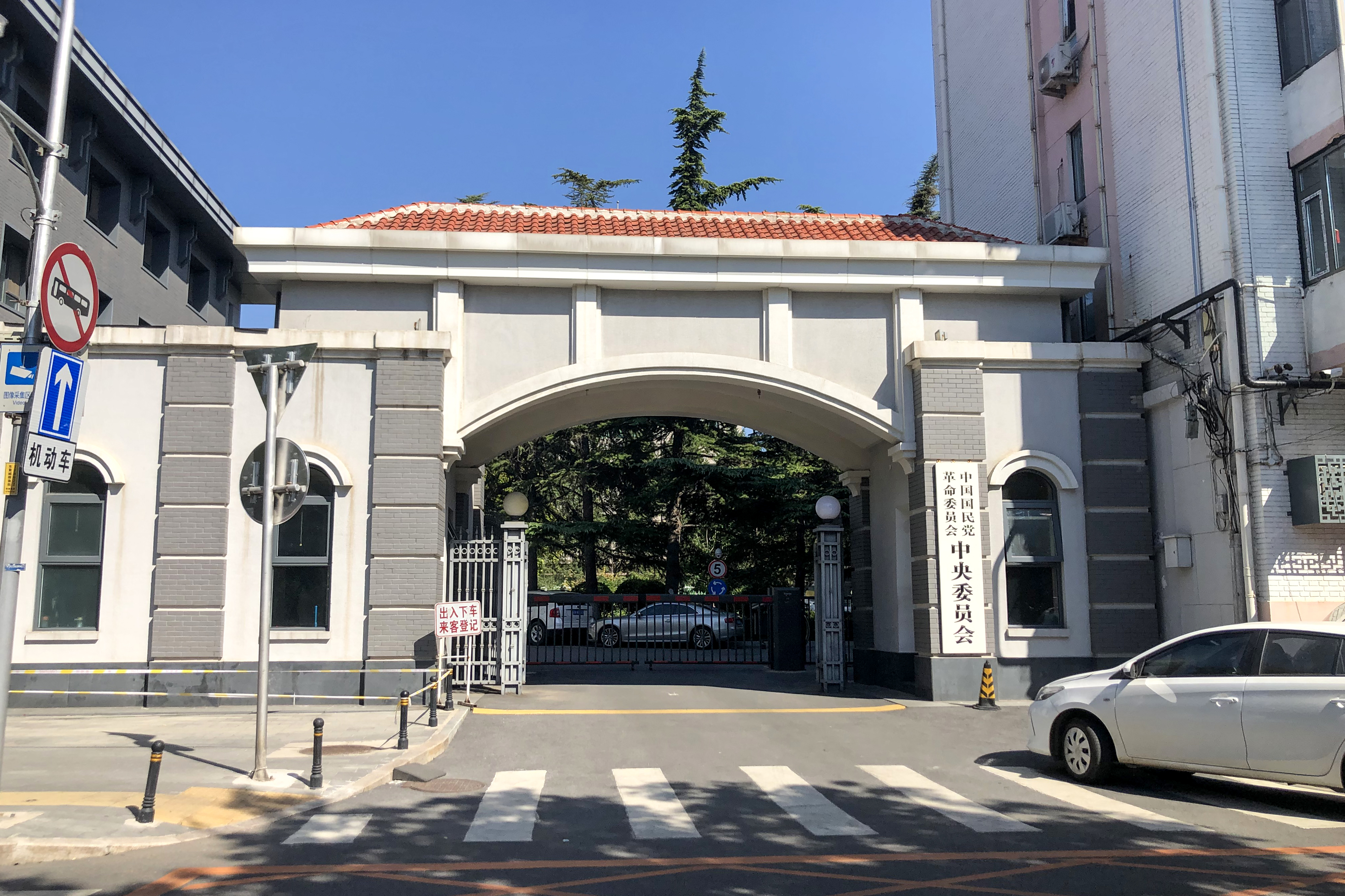
The headquarters of the Central Committee of the RCCK

The Central Committee of the RCCK is the highest body of the RCCK between National Congresses. It has six working departments:

- General Office
- Organization Department
- Publicity Department
- Liaison Department
- Social Services Department
- Research Department.

The Central Committee additionally owns the newspapers Unity Daily (团结报; Tuánjié Bào) and Unity (团结; Tuánjié). The Central Committee is headed by a chairperson, who is assisted by several vice chairpersons. The chairperson of the RCCK Central Committee is usually a vice chairperson of the Standing Committee of the National People's Congress, while the executive vice chairman is usually the vice chairperson of the National Committee of the Chinese People's Political Consultative Conference. The current leaders of the RCCK are:

==== RCCK Central Committee Chairman ====
- Zheng Jianbang, also a vice chairman of the Standing Committee of the National People's Congress

==== RCCK Central Committee Vice Chairpersons ====
- He Baoxiang (First-ranking)
- Liu Jiaqiang
- Li Huidong
- Tian Hongqi
- Wang Hong
- Feng Gong
- Wu Jing
- Ouyang Zehua
- Gu Zhenchun
- Chen Xingying

=== Membership ===
According to the State Council Information Office, the RCCK consists "mainly of people who have links with the KMT, have historical and social connections with the committee, or have relationships with Taiwan compatriots, along with specialists in social and legal affairs, and in business relating to agriculture, rural areas, and rural people". In December 2022, the party had around 158,000 members.

== Historical leaders ==
=== Chairpersons of the Central Committee ===
No.	Chairperson	Took office	Left office	Ref.
1	Li Jishen 李济深	January 1948	October 1959	
2	He Xiangning 何香凝	August 1960	1 September 1972	
3	Zhu Yunshan 朱蕴山	October 1979	30 April 1981	
4	Wang Kunlun 王昆仑	9 September 1981	23 August 1985	
5	Qu Wu 屈武	September 1985	December 1987	
6	Zhu Xuefan 朱学范	December 1987	December 1992	
7	Li Peiyao 李沛瑶	December 1992	2 February 1996	
8	He Luli 何鲁丽	11 November 1996	15 December 2007	
9	Zhou Tienong 周铁农	15 December 2007	18 December 2012	
10	Wan Exiang 万鄂湘	18 December 2012	18 March 2018	
11	Zheng Jianbang 郑建邦	10 December 2022	Incumbent	

=== Honorary Chairpersons of the Central Committee ===
1. Song Qingling (宋庆龄), 1948–1949
2. Qu Wu (屈武), 1988–1992
3. Zhu Xuefan (朱学范), 1992–1996
4. Hou Jingru (侯镜如), 1992–1994
5. Sun Yueqi (孙越崎), 1992–1995

=== Chairpersons of provincial committees ===
- Han Youwen (韩有文), Chairman of the Xinjiang Branch until 1998

== Electoral history ==
=== National People's Congress elections ===
Election year	Number of seats
2002–03	47 / 2,984
2007–08	46 / 2,987
2012–13	34 / 2,987
2017–18	43 / 2,970
2022–23	41 / 2,977

== See also ==
- Politics of China
- Left Socialist-Revolutionaries
