= List of presidents of Peking University =

The President of Peking University is the chief administrator of Peking University, a major public academic institution of higher learning, located in Beijing, capital of the People's Republic of China. Each is appointed by and is responsible to the Central Committee of the Chinese Communist Party and the State Council, who delegate to him or her the day-to-day running of the university. The current president is Gong Qihuang, in office since June 2022.

== Presidents of Peking University ==
Period	Year	President (English name)	President (Chinese name)	Alma mater	Ref
Imperial University of Peking	July 1898-Spring 1900	Sun Jianai	孙家鼐		
Imperial University of Peking	July 1899-July 1900	Xu Jingcheng	许景澄		
Imperial University of Peking	January 1902-February 1904	Zhang Baixi	张百熙		
Imperial University of Peking	February 1904-February 1906	Zhang Hengjia	张亨嘉		
Imperial University of Peking	February 1906-July 1907	Li Jiaju	李家驹		
Imperial University of Peking	July 1907-December 1907	Zhu Yifan	朱益藩		
Imperial University of Peking	December 1907-September 1910	Liu Tingshen	刘廷琛		
Imperial University of Peking	September 1910-November 1911	Ke Shaomin	柯劭愍		
Imperial University of Peking	November 1911-February 1912	Lao Naixuan	劳乃宣		
National Peking University	February 1912-October 1912	Yan Fu	严复	Royal Naval College, Greenwich	
National Peking University	December 1912-November 1913	He Xiehou	何燏时	Zhejiang University; Tokyo Imperial University	
National Peking University	November 1913-December 1916	Hu Renyuan	胡仁源	Shanghai Jiao Tong University; Peking University	
National Peking University	December 1916-August 1927	Cai Yuanpei	蔡元培	Universität Leipzig; Humboldt University of Berlin	
Imperial College of Peking	August 1927-June 1928	Liu Zhe	刘哲	Peking University	
National Peiping University	June 1928-January 1929	Li Shizeng	李煜瀛	Pasteur Institute; Ecole Pratique d'Agriculture du Chesnoy	
National Peiping University	January 1929-August 1929	Chen Daqi	陈大齐	University of Tokyo; Humboldt University of Berlin	
National Peking University	September 1929-December 1930	Cai Yuanpei	蔡元培	Universität Leipzig; Humboldt University of Berlin	
National Peking University	December 1930-July 1937	Jiang Menglin	蒋梦麟	University of California, Berkeley; Columbia University	
National Peking University	January 1939-March 1940	Tang Erhe	汤尔和		
National Peking University	March 1940-October 1945	Qian Daosun	钱稻孙	Italy National University	
National Peking University	October 1945-August 1946	Fu Sinian	傅斯年	Peking University; University College London; Humboldt University of Berlin	
National Peking University	September 1946-December 1948	Hu Shih	胡适	Cornell University; Columbia University	
Peking University	May 1949-September 1951	Tang Yongtong	汤用彤	Harvard University	
Peking University	June 1951-March 1960	Ma Yinchu	马寅初	Tianjin University; Yale University; Columbia University	
Peking University	March 1960-June 1966	Lu Ping	陆平		
Peking University	July 1978-March 1981	Zhou Peiyuan	周培源	Tsinghua University; University of Chicago; California Institute of Technology	
Peking University	May 1981-March 1984	Zhang Longxiang	张龙翔	University of Shanghai; Lingnan University; Tsinghua University; University of Toronto; Yale University	
Peking University	March 1984-August 1989	Ding Shisun	丁石孙	Utopia University; Tsinghua University	
Peking University	August 1989-August 1996	Wu Shuqing	吴树青	Renmin University of China	
Peking University	July 1996-November 1999	Chen Jia'er	陈佳洱	Jilin University	
Peking University	November 1999-November 2008	Xu Zhihong	许智宏	Peking University; University of Nottingham	
Peking University	November 2008-March 2013	Zhou Qifeng	周其凤	Peking University; University of Massachusetts Amherst	
Peking University	March 2013-February 2015	Wang Enge	王恩哥	Liaoning University; Peking University	
Peking University	February 2015-23 October 2018	Lin Jianhua	林建华	Peking University	
Peking University	23 October 2018–June 2022	Hao Ping	郝平	Peking University; University of Hawaii	
Peking University	June 2022–present	Gong Qihuang	龚旗煌	Peking University	

== Communist Party Secretaries of Peking University ==
Period	Year	Communist Party Secretary (English name)	Communist Party Secretary (Chinese name)	Alma mater	Ref
Peking University	January 1949-March 1949	Xiao Song	萧松		
Peking University	March 1949-June 1949	Lin Naisang	林乃桑		
Peking University	June 1949-October 1951	Ye Xiangzhong	叶向忠		
Peking University	October 1951-October 1952	Zhang Qunyu	张群玉		
Peking University	October 1952-December 1954	Li Hu	李瑚	Fu Jen Catholic University	
Peking University	December 1954-December 1956	Shi Menglan	史梦兰		
Peking University	December 1956-October 1957	Jiang Longji	江隆基	Peking University; Meiji University; Humboldt University of Berlin	
Peking University	October 1957-June 1966	Lu Ping	陆平		
Peking University	September 1977-December 1979	Zhou Lin	周林	Hongda College	
Peking University	December 1979-September 1982	Han Tianshi	韩天石		
Peking University	September 1982-March 1984	Xiang Ziming	项子明		
Peking University	March 1984-January 1991	Wang Xuezhen	王学珍	Peking University	
Peking University	January 1991-July 1994	Wang Jialiu	汪家鏐	Peking University	
Peking University	July 1994-March 2000	Ren Yanshen	任彦申	Tsinghua University	
Peking University	April 2000-April 2002	Wang Debing	王德炳	Peking University Health Science Center	
Peking University	April 2002-August 2011	Min Weifang	闵维方	Beijing Normal University; University of Texas at Austin; Stanford University	
Peking University	August 2011-December 2016	Zhu Shanlu	朱善璐	Peking University	
Peking University	December 2016-23 October 2018	Hao Ping	郝平	Peking University; University of Hawaii	
Peking University	23 October 2018	Qiu Shuiping	邱水平	Peking University	
Peking University	June 2022–present	Hao Ping	郝平	Peking University; University of Hawaii	
