= Wang Jialiu =

Chinese politician

- 汪家镠

Executive Deputy President of the Central Party School of the Chinese Communist Party
- In office July 1993 – February 1998
- President: Hu Jintao
- Preceded by: Gao Di
- Succeeded by: Zheng Bijian

Communist Party Secretary of Peking University
- In office January 1991 – July 1994
- President: Wu Shuqing
- Preceded by: Wang Xuezhen
- Succeeded by: Ren Yanshen

Personal details
- Born: March 1929 (age 97) Pinghu County, Zhejiang, China
- Party: Chinese Communist Party
- Education: Peking University

Chinese name
- Simplified Chinese: 汪家镠
- Traditional Chinese: 汪家鏐
Transcriptions
Standard Mandarin
- Hanyu Pinyin: Wāng Jiāliú

Wang Jialiu (Chinese: 汪家镠; born March 1929) is a Chinese politician who served as party secretary of Peking University from 1991 to 1994 and executive deputy president of the CCP Central Party School from 1993 to 1998.

She was an alternate member of the 12th and 13th Central Committee of the Chinese Communist Party, and a member of the 14th Central Committee of the Chinese Communist Party. She was a member of the Standing Committee of the 9th National People's Congress.

== Biography ==
Wang was born in Pinghu County (now Pinghu), Zhejiang, in March 1929. She attended Shanghai Nanping Girls' School. She joined the Chinese Communist Party (CCP) in January 1946. In September 1946, she enrolled at the College of Agriculture, Peking University, but shifted to the study of literature later.

After founding of the Communist State in 1949, Wang worked in the Beijing Municipal Committee of the Communist Youth League of China, and was assigned to state-owned enterprises in Beijing in 1972. She was recalled to the CCP Beijing Municipal Committee in October 1975 and eventually became deputy party secretary in September 1988. She also served as deputy party secretary of Tsinghua University. She was appointed party secretary of Peking University in January 1991, in addition to serving as executive deputy president of the CCP Central Party School since July 1993.

In March 1998, she took office as vice chairperson of the National People's Congress Education, Science, Culture and Public Health Committee.

Party political offices
Preceded by Wang Xuezhen	Communist Party Secretary of Peking University; 1991–1994	Succeeded by Ren Yanshen
Educational offices
Preceded by Gao Di	Executive Deputy President of the Central Party School of the Chinese Communist Party; 1993–1998	Succeeded by Zheng Bijian
