= List of members of the 12th National People's Congress Standing Committee =

This list involves the members of the Standing Committee of the National People's Congress of China, who were last elected by the 12th National People's Congress in March 2013.

== Members ==
Member	Provincial group	Sex	Ethnic group	Birth year	Party
Ding Zhongli	Tibet	M	Han	1957	China Democratic League
Wei Liucheng	Hainan	M	Han	1946	Chinese Communist Party
Ma Zhiwu	Jiangxi	M	Hui	1957	Revolutionary Committee of the Chinese Kuomintang
Ma Wen	Tianjin	F	Han	1948	Chinese Communist Party
Ma Ruiwen	Ningxia	M	Hui	1951	Chinese Communist Party
Wang Naikun	Shanghai	F	Han	1953	Chinese Communist Party
Wang Wanbin	Beijing	M	Han	1949	Chinese Communist Party
Wang Ercheng	Beijing	M	Han	1955	Chinese Communist Party
Wang Gang	Hebei	M	Han	1958	China Association for Promoting Democracy
Wang Qingxi	Ningxia	M	Han	1954	Chinese Communist Party
Wang Zuoshu	Heilongjiang	M	Han	1947	China Association for Promoting Democracy
Wang Longde	Henan	M	Han	1947	Chinese Communist Party
Wang Qijiang	Hebei	M	Han	1954	Chinese Communist Party
GEN Wang Guosheng	People's Liberation Army	M	Han	1947	Chinese Communist Party
Wang Mingwen	Sichuan	F	Han	1968	Jiusan Society
Wang Shengming	Zhejiang	M	Han	1956	Chinese Communist Party
Wang Yi	Jiangxi	M	Han	1962	China Association for Promoting Democracy
Yunfeng	Inner Mongolia	M	Mongol	1952	Chinese Communist Party
Che Guangtie	Jilin	M	Korean	1957	Chinese Communist Party
Wuritu	Inner Mongolia	M	Mongol	1955	Chinese Communist Party
Fang Xin	Beijing	F	Han	1955	Chinese Communist Party
Yin Zhongqing	Henan	M	Han	1959	Chinese Communist Party
Deng Liping	Fujian	M	Han	1954	Revolutionary Committee of the Chinese Kuomintang
Deng Xiuxin	Hubei	M	Han	1961	China Democratic League
GEN Deng Changyou	People's Liberation Army	M	Han	1947	Chinese Communist Party
Ashat Kerimbay	Xinjiang	M	Uyghur	1947	Chinese Communist Party
Long Zhuangwei	Hebei	M	Hmong	1956	China Democratic League
Long Chaoyun	Guizhou	F	Dong	1952	Chinese Communist Party
Shi Lianxi	Tianjin	F	Han	1952	Chinese Communist Party
Padma Choling	Tibet	M	Tibetan	1951	Chinese Communist Party
Bai Zhijian	Guangdong	M	Han	1948	Chinese Communist Party
Cong Bin	Hebei	M	Han	1957	Jiusan Society
Ling Hu'an	Shanxi	M	Han	1946	Chinese Communist Party
Feng Changgen	Zhejiang	M	Han	1953	Chinese Communist Party
Feng Shuping	Tianjin	F	Han	1951	Chinese Communist Party
Lü Zushan	Zhejiang	M	Han	1946	Chinese Communist Party
Lü Wei	Hainan	F	Han	1956	Chinese Communist Party
LTG Zhu Fazhong	People's Liberation Army	M	Han	1948	Chinese Communist Party
Zhu Jingzhi	Shaanxi	F	Han	1955	Chinese Peasants' and Workers' Democratic Party
Qiao Xiaoyang	Jiangsu	M	Han	1945	Chinese Communist Party
Ren Maodong	Qinghai	M	Han	1951	Chinese Communist Party
Liu Zhengkui	Liaoning	M	Han	1962	Jiusan Society
Liu Zhenwei	Anhui	M	Han	1956	Chinese Communist Party
LTG Liu Zhenlai	People's Liberation Army	M	Hui	1949	Chinese Communist Party
LTG Liu Zhenqi	People's Liberation Army	M	Han	1946	Chinese Communist Party
Liu Xincheng	Beijing	M	Han	1952	China Association for Promoting Democracy
Liu Depei	Anhui	M	Han	1950	Chinese Communist Party
Yan Xiaopei	Chongqing	F	Han	1956	China Zhi Gong Party
Xu Weigang	Henan	M	Han	1958	Nonpartisan
Xu Zhenchao	Shandong	M	Han	1950	Chinese Communist Party
GEN Sun Dafa	People's Liberation Army	M	Han	1945	Chinese Communist Party
Sun Zhijun	Jiangsu	M	Han	1957	Chinese Communist Party
Sun Baoshu	Tianjin	M	Han	1950	Chinese Communist Party
Maimaitimin Yasin	Xinjiang	M	Uyghur	1951	Chinese Communist Party
Yan Yixin	Fujian	M	Han	1949	China Zhi Gong Party
Su Zelin	Sichuan	M	Han	1951	Chinese Communist Party
Su Xiaoyun	Hubei	M	Tujia	1951	Chinese Communist Party
Su Hui	Beijing	F	Han	1956	Taiwan Democratic Self-Government League
Du Liming	Chongqing	M	Han	1955	Chinese Peasants' and Workers' Democratic Party
Li Fei	Guangdong	M	Han	1953	Chinese Communist Party
GEN Li Shiming	People's Liberation Army	M	Han	1948	Chinese Communist Party
Li Yi	Sichuan	M	Han	1960	Chinese Communist Party
GEN Li Andong	People's Liberation Army	M	Han	1946	Chinese Communist Party
Li Yi	Guangxi	M	Han	1954	Chinese Communist Party
Li Lingwei	Zhejiang	F	Han	1964	Chinese Communist Party
Li Shishi	Hunan	M	Han	1953	Chinese Communist Party
Li Shenglin	Tianjin	M	Han	1946	Chinese Communist Party
Li Jingtian	Liaoning	M	Manchu	1953	Chinese Communist Party
Li Zhiyong	Jiangsu	M	Han	1953	Chinese Communist Party
Li Lu	Shandong	M	Han	1954	Chinese Communist Party
Li Shenming	Henan	M	Han	1949	Chinese Communist Party
Yang Wei	Zhejiang	M	Han	1954	Chinese Communist Party
Yang Bangjie	Sichuan	M	Han	1948	China Zhi Gong Party
Yang Zhen	Jiangsu	M	Han	1961	Chinese Peasants' and Workers' Democratic Party
Wu Heng	Guangxi	M	Han	1956	Chinese Communist Party
Wu Xiaoling	Guizhou	F	Han	1947	Chinese Communist Party
He Huahui	Guangdong	F	Han	1954	Chinese Communist Party
Wang Yifu	Taiwan	M	Han	1950	Taiwan Democratic Self-Government League
Shen Chunyao	Shandong	M	Han	1960	Chinese Communist Party
GEN Chi Wanchun	People's Liberation Army	M	Han	1948	Chinese Communist Party
Zhang Yunchuan	Hebei	M	Han	1946	Chinese Communist Party
Zhang Shaoqin	Shandong	M	Han	1953	China Democratic National Construction Association
Zhang Ping	Shanxi	M	Han	1953	China Democratic League
Zhang Xingkai	Liaoning	M	Han	1961	Revolutionary Committee of the Chinese Kuomintang
Zhang Mingqi	Shandong	M	Han	1953	Chinese Communist Party
Zhang Jian	Guizhou	M	Han	1952	Chinese Communist Party
Zhang Tao	Anhui	M	Han	1964	China Association for Promoting Democracy
Lu Hao	Gansu	M	Han	1947	Chinese Communist Party
Chen Fengxiang	Hubei	M	Han	1955	Chinese Communist Party
Chen Guangguo	Chongqing	M	Han	1947	Chinese Communist Party
Chen Xiurong	Fujian	F	Han	1953	Chinese Communist Party
Chen Shutao	Heilongjiang	M	Manchu	1950	Chinese Peasants' and Workers' Democratic Party
GEN Chen Guoling	People's Liberation Army	M	Han	1947	Chinese Communist Party
Chen Jianguo	Ningxia	M	Han	1945	Chinese Communist Party
Chen Xiqing	Shandong	M	Han	1956	Chinese Communist Party
Chen Weiwen	Taiwan	M	Han	1950	Taiwan Democratic Self-Government League
Si Jianmin	Zhejiang	M	Han	1957	Jiusan Society
Rita Fan Hsu Lai-tai	Hong Kong	F	Han	1945	Nonpartisan
Ouyang Song	Beijing	M	Han	1948	Chinese Communist Party
Zhuo Xinping	Hunan	M	Tujia	1955	Chinese Communist Party
Luo Liangquan	Guizhou	M	Hmong	1954	Chinese Communist Party
Luo Qingquan	Hubei	M	Han	1945	Chinese Communist Party
Zhou Tianhong	Guangdong	M	Han	1958	Revolutionary Committee of the Chinese Kuomintang
Zhou Qifeng	Beijing	M	Han	1947	Chinese Communist Party
Pang Lijuan	Beijing	F	Han	1962	China Association for Promoting Democracy
Zheng Gongcheng	Heilongjiang	M	Han	1964	China Democratic League
Lang Sheng	Zhejiang	M	Han	1954	Chinese Communist Party
Zhao Shaojua	Heilongjiang	F	Manchu	1952	Chinese Communist Party
Zhao Baige	Jiangxi	F	Han	1952	Chinese Communist Party
Zhao Deming	Guangxi	M	Yao	1963	Chinese Communist Party
Hao Ruyu	Hainan	M	Han	1948	Nonpartisan
Liu Binjie	Sichuan	M	Han	1948	Chinese Communist Party
Xiu Fujin	Jilin	M	Han	1950	Revolutionary Committee of the Chinese Kuomintang
Xin Chunying	Hebei	F	Han	1956	Chinese Communist Party
Hou Yibin	Sichuan	M	Han	1952	Jiusan Society
Hong Yi	Gansu	M	Han	1954	Chinese Communist Party
Yao Jiannian	Shandong	M	Han	1953	Chinese Peasants' and Workers' Democratic Party
Yao Sheng	Hubei	M	Han	1955	Chinese Communist Party
Ho lat Seng	Macau	M	Han	1957	Nonpartisan
Qin Shunquan	Hubei	M	Han	1963	Nonpartisan
Yuan Si	Yunnan	M	Han	1953	Nonpartisan
Mo Wenxiu	Sichuan	F	Han	1952	Chinese Communist Party
Guo Fenglian	Shanxi	F	Han	1947	Chinese Communist Party
Guo Lei	Liaoning	M	Han	1961	Nonpartisan
Tang Shili	Guizhou	F	Bouyei	1952	Chinese Communist Party
Huang Xiaojing	Fujian	M	Han	1946	Chinese Communist Party
Huang Huahua	Guangdong	M	Han	1946	Chinese Communist Party
Huang Boyun	Hunan	M	Han	1945	Chinese Communist Party
GEN Huang Xianzhong	People's Liberation Army	M	Han	1945	Chinese Communist Party
Cao Weizhou	Henan	M	Han	1954	Chinese Communist Party
Gong Jianming	Hunan	M	Han	1956	Chinese Peasants' and Workers' Democratic Party
Sheng Guangzu	Jiangsu	M	Han	1949	Chinese Communist Party
Fu Yuelan	Henan	F	Li	1953	Chinese Communist Party
GEN Zhang Qinsheng	People's Liberation Army	M	Han	1948	Chinese Communist Party
Liang Shengli	Guangxi	M	Zhuang	1953	Chinese Communist Party
Peng Sen	Guizhou	M	Han	1951	Chinese Communist Party
Dong Zhongyuan	Henan	M	Han	1956	Chinese Communist Party
Jiang Jufeng	Sichuan	M	Han	1948	Chinese Communist Party
Jiang Zhuangde	Shaanxi	M	Han	1955	China Democratic League
Han Xiaowu	Beijing	M	Han	1958	Chinese Communist Party
Gu Shengzu	Hubei	M	Han	1956	China Democratic National Construction Association
Fu Ying	Inner Mongolia	F	Mongol	1953	Chinese Communist Party
Wen Fujiang	Shandong	M	Han	1955	China Democratic League
Xie Xiaojun	Chongqing	M	Han	1950	Jiusan Society
Xie Xuren	Henan	M	Han	1947	Chinese Communist Party
Dou Shuhua	Tianjin	M	Han	1957	Chinese Communist Party
Jamyang Lobsang Jigmé Tubdain Qoigyi Nyima Rinpoche	Gansu	M	Tibetan	1947	Nonpartisan
Cai Fang	Jiangsu	M	Han	1956	Chinese Communist Party
Liao Xiaojun	Chongqing	M	Han	1952	Chinese Communist Party
Mu Dongsheng	Qinghai	M	Hui	1954	Chinese Communist Party

== Statistics ==
=== Seats by party ===
Party	Seats
Chinese Communist Party	104
Nonpartisan	8
China Democratic League	7
China Association for Promoting Democracy	6
Jiusan Society	6
Chinese Peasants' and Workers' Democratic Party	6
Revolutionary Committee of the Chinese Kuomintang	5
China Zhi Gong Party	3
Taiwan Democratic Self-Government League	3
China Democratic National Construction Association	2
Total	150

=== Seats by ethnicity ===
Ethnicity	Seats
Han	126
Hui	4
Mongol	3
Manchu	3
Tibetan	2
Uyghur	2
Hmong	2
Tujia	2
Korean	1
Dong	1
Yao	1
Bouyei	1
Li	1
Zhuang	1
Total	150

=== Seats by birthyear ===
Birthyear	Seats	Of total
1940–1949	45	30.00%
1950–1959	92	61.33%
1960–1969	13	8.67%
Total	150	100.00%
