= Lao Naixuan =

Chinese academic

- 劳乃宣
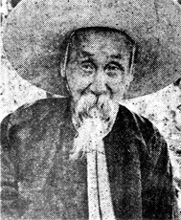
- Lao Naixuan

President of Peking University
- In office November 1911 – February 1912
- Monarch: Xuantong Emperor
- Preceded by: Ke Shaomin
- Succeeded by: Yan Fu

Personal details
- Born: 14 November 1843 Guangping, Zhili, China
- Died: 21 July 1921 (aged 77) China
- Occupation: Academic, Writer

Lao Naixuan (勞乃宣) (14 November 1843 – 21 July 1921) was a Chinese official and scholar of the late Qing dynasty. He served as the President of Peking University from November 1911 to February 1912.

== Personal life ==
His Chinese name was 勞乃宣.

He was born in Guangping, Zhili (modern-day Yongnian, Hebei), and his ancestral home was Tongxiang, Zhejiang.

He was born on 14 November 1843 in Guangping, Zhili, China.

He died on 21 July 1921 in China.

== Career ==
=== Bureaucratic career ===
He became a bureaucrat of the Imperial government by passing the national exams, first as a compiler of documents at Baoding Annals Bureau. He later became a magistrate of rural counties in Hebei Province. Following that, he took over the post of provincial Supervisor of Education in the Jiangning Prefecture.

He also served as a minister in the Government of Zhang Xun.

=== Academic career ===
He served as the President of Peking University from November 1911 to February 1912.

He also participated in the late Qing dynasty's phonetic script movement (i.e., the phonetic writing movement).

He is also known for revising Wang Zhao's "Mandarin Phonetic Alphabet" into Simplified Phonetic Characters.

He worked with the German missionary Richard Wilhelm to translate the I Ching into German.

== Bibliography ==
His notable works include:

- Gu chou suan kao shi : 古籌算考釋 : 六卷 / 勞乃宣撰
- Yi he quan jiao men yuan liu kao : 義和拳敎門源流考 : 一卷 / 勞乃宣撰
- Qing Lao Rensou xian sheng Naixuan zi ding nian pu : 清勞韌叟先生乃宣自訂年譜 / 勞乃宣撰
- Rensou zi ding nian pu : 韌叟自訂年譜 / 勞乃宣著
- Zhong Ri yi he ji lüe / Li Hongzhang zhuan. Ge guo yue zhang zuan yao 中日議和紀略 / 李鴻章撰. 各國約章纂要 / 勞乃宣纂
