= Lei Zhou =

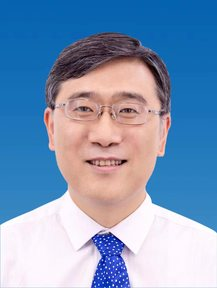
- Education: Fudan University
- Awards: Fellow of American Physical Society, Fellow of Chinese Optical Society
- Scientific career
- Fields: metamaterials, nanophotonics
- Workplaces: Fudan University

Lei Zhou (周磊) is a Chinese physicist. His research interests are metamaterials, nanophotonics, and magnetism. He is a professor and vice president at Fudan University, recipient of the National Science Fund for Distinguished Young Scholars, and a fellow of the American Physical Society (APS) and the Chinese Optical Society (COS).

== Education and career ==
Zhou was born in Xintai, Shandong in 1972. He received his bachelor's degree in physics in 1992 and his PhD in 1997, both from Fudan University.

From March 1997 to May 1997, Zhou was a visiting scholar in the Department of Physics at the Hong Kong University of Science and Technology. From September 1997 to March 2000, Zhou was a postdoctoral researcher at Tohoku University, Sendai, where he studied the magnetic properties of transition metal systems as part of The Institute of Metal Materials. From April 2000 to August 2004, Zhou was a visiting scholar in the Department of Physics at Hong Kong University of Science and Technology. There, he focused on the research areas of meta-materials and photonic crystals. In September 2004, Zhou was appointed as a professor and doctoral supervisor of the Department of Physics of Fudan University, a position he held until 2020.

== Research ==
Zhou's research focuses on electromagnetic metamaterials, nanophotonics, and magnetism. He found that a class of gradient-index metamaterial surfaces can perfectly convert propagating electromagnetic waves into surface-bound modes. His work also revealed a mechanism for manipulating electromagnetic-wave polarization using metamaterials, and for perfect photonic transmission. He has proposed a mechanism for the formation of photonic band gaps—namely, the zero–average refractive index band gap, worked on photonic band gaps in planar fractal structures through localized resonances and a theoretical framework for analyzing electromagnetic modes in metallic ring structures.

According to Light: Science & Applications, "Zhou is a leading figure in metamaterials and metasurfaces. His pioneering works on developing gradient-index metasurfaces and utilizing ultrathin anisotropic materials for polarization control have co-shaped the foundational framework of metasurfaces."

== Awards and recognition ==
In December 2006, Zhou received funding from the "Fok Yingdong Young Teachers Fund". In 2007, Zhou was funded by the National Science Foundation for Distinguished Young Scholars.

In 2024, Zhou became a fellow of the American Physical Society (APS) and the Chinese Optical Society (COS).

== Selected publications ==
- Gradient-index meta-surfaces as a bridge linking propagating waves and surface waves, S. Sun, Q. He, S. Xiao, Q. Xu, X. Li and L. Zhou, Nature Materials 11, 426-431 (2012). DOI: 10.1038/NMAT3292
- Resonance properties of metallic ring systems, L. Zhou et al., Materials Today, 12 (12) 52-59 (2009).
- Manipulating Electromagnetic wave polarizations by anisotropic metamaterials, J. Hao, Y. Yuan, L. Ran, T. Jiang, J. A. Kong, C. T. Chan, and L. Zhou, Phys. Rev. Lett. 99 063908 (2007).
- Electromagnetic wave tunnelling through negative-permittivity media with high magnetic fields, L. Zhou et al., Phys. Rev. Lett. 94 243905 (2005).
- Photonic band gap from a stack of positive and negative index materials, J. Li, L. Zhou, et al., Phys. Rev. Lett. 90 083901 (2003).
- Subwavelength photonic band gaps from planar fractals, W. Wen, L. Zhou, et al., Phys. Rev. Lett. 89 223901 (2002).
- Ground states of magnetorheological fluids, L. Zhou et al., Phys. Rev. Letts. 81 1509 (1998).
