= Communist Party People Net =

Chinese website

- Website type: Left-wing website
- Dissolved: February 2006
- Website: www.gcdr.com.cn

The Communist Party People Net, was a Chinese left-wing website created by a group of Chinese believers in communism. In February 2006, the website was suspended.

Communist Party People Net claimed to truly represent the workers, peasants, soldiers, and communist ideology. The site propagated Mao Zedong Thought.

== Shut down ==
In February 2006, Communist Party People Net was shut down by the Chinese government, possibly related to the site's publication of articles critical of Zheng Bijian. Another view was that this site violated Chinese government regulations and was not qualified for journalism.
