= Ren Yuzhong =

- 任羽中

Vice President of Peking University
- In office March 2024 – September 2025
- President: Gong Qihuang
- Party Secretary: He Guangcai

Personal details
- Born: January 1980 (age 46) Ziyang County, Sichuan, China
- Party: Chinese Communist Party (expelled in 2025)
- Education: Peking University

Ren Yuzhong (Chinese: 任羽中; pinyin: Rén Yǔzhōng; born January 1980) is a former Chinese educator and university administrator who served as vice president of Peking University from 2024 to 2025. His career trajectory from academic excellence to high-ranking leadership and eventual downfall in 2025. In September 2025, he turned himself in and is cooperating with the Central Commission for Discipline Inspection (CCDI) and National Supervisory Commission for investigation of "suspected violations of disciplines and laws".

== Early life and education ==
Ren was born in Ziyang County (now Ziyang), Sichuan, in January 1980. He attended Ziyang High School. In 1998, he achieved the highest score in the national college entrance examination for liberal arts in Sichuan, becoming the provincial top scorer. He enrolled in Peking University, where he majored in international politics. He demonstrated exceptional academic excellence, winning Mingde Scholarship for four consecutive years and the University Innovation Award twice. He also earned a master's degree in Chinese and foreign political system and a doctor of law degree.

== Career ==
After completing his graduate studies, Ren remained at Peking University, embarking on an administrative career that would span over two decades with various posts, including director of the Secretariat Office of the Party Committee and University Office, deputy director of the Party Committee Policy Research Office, deputy director of the Policy and Regulation Research Office, executive deputy director of the Party Committee Policy Research Office, director of the Policy and Regulation Research Office (Party Committee Policy Research Office), head of the Personnel Department, head of the Teacher Work Department of the Party Committee, director of the Talent Exchange and Training Center, director of the Teacher Talent Office, head of the Propaganda Department of the Party Committee, secretary-general of the Party Committee, press spokesperson, and director of the Media Integration Center. In March 2024, he reached the pinnacle of his administrative career when he was promoted to vice president, becoming the youngest vice president in the history of Peking University.

== Downfall ==
On 17 September 2025, Ren voluntarily handed himself in to the Central Commission for Discipline Inspection (CCDI), the party's internal disciplinary body, and the National Supervisory Commission, the highest anti-corruption agency of China. He was the first highest-ranking official in the education system to surrender to anti-corruption authorities in 2025. On December 8, he was expelled from the Chinese Communist Party and dismissed from public office.
