= Wang Xuezhen =

Chinese politician (1926–2021)

- 王学珍

Communist Party Secretary of Peking University
- In office March 1984 – November 1990
- President: Zhang Longxiang; Ding Shisun; Wu Shuqing
- Preceded by: Xiang Ziming
- Succeeded by: Wang Jialiu

Personal details
- Born: August 1926 Qu County, Zhejiang, China
- Died: 13 December 2021 (aged 95) Beijing, China
- Party: Chinese Communist Party
- Education: Peking University

Chinese name
- Simplified Chinese: 王学珍
- Traditional Chinese: 王學珍
Transcriptions
Standard Mandarin
- Hanyu Pinyin: Wáng Xuézhēn

Wang Xuezhen (Chinese: 王学珍; August 1926 – 13 December 2021) was a Chinese politician who served as party secretary of Peking University from 1984 to 1991. He was an alternate member of the 12th and 13th Central Committee of the Chinese Communist Party. He was a member of the 8th National Committee of the Chinese People's Political Consultative Conference.

== Biography ==
Wang was born in Qu County (now Longyou County), Zhejiang, in August 1926. He participated in the Chinese Communist Revolution in January 1948, and joined the Chinese Communist Party (CCP) in July of that same year. He secondary studied at Zhejiang Provincial No. 8 High School (now Quzhou No. 1 High School). In 1947, he was admitted to Peking University, majoring in law. After graduating in 1951, he stayed at the university and worked successively as president of the Student Union, director of Organization Department, and director of Academic Affairs Office. In 1966, the Cultural Revolution broke out, he was discharged and sent to the May Seventh Cadre Schools to do farm works in east China's Jiangxi province. He was reinstated in 1972 and was elevated to vice president in 1978. He was appointed party secretary, the top political position of the university, in March 1984, and served until November 1990. During his term in office, the 1989 Tiananmen Square protests and massacre broke out, on 18 May, he expressed his support for the students when he participated in the "dialogue" between the representatives of the leaders of the student movement and then Premier Li Peng at the Great Hall of the People. He died in Beijing on 13 December 2021, at the age of 95.

Party political offices
Preceded by Xiang Ziming	Communist Party Secretary of Peking University; 1984–1990	Succeeded by Wang Jialiu
