= Fang Xin =

Fang Xin may refer to:

- Fang Xin (politician)
- Fang Xin (ice hockey)
- Fon Cin (方馨; Fāng Xīn), Taiwanese actress
