= Light: Science & Applications =

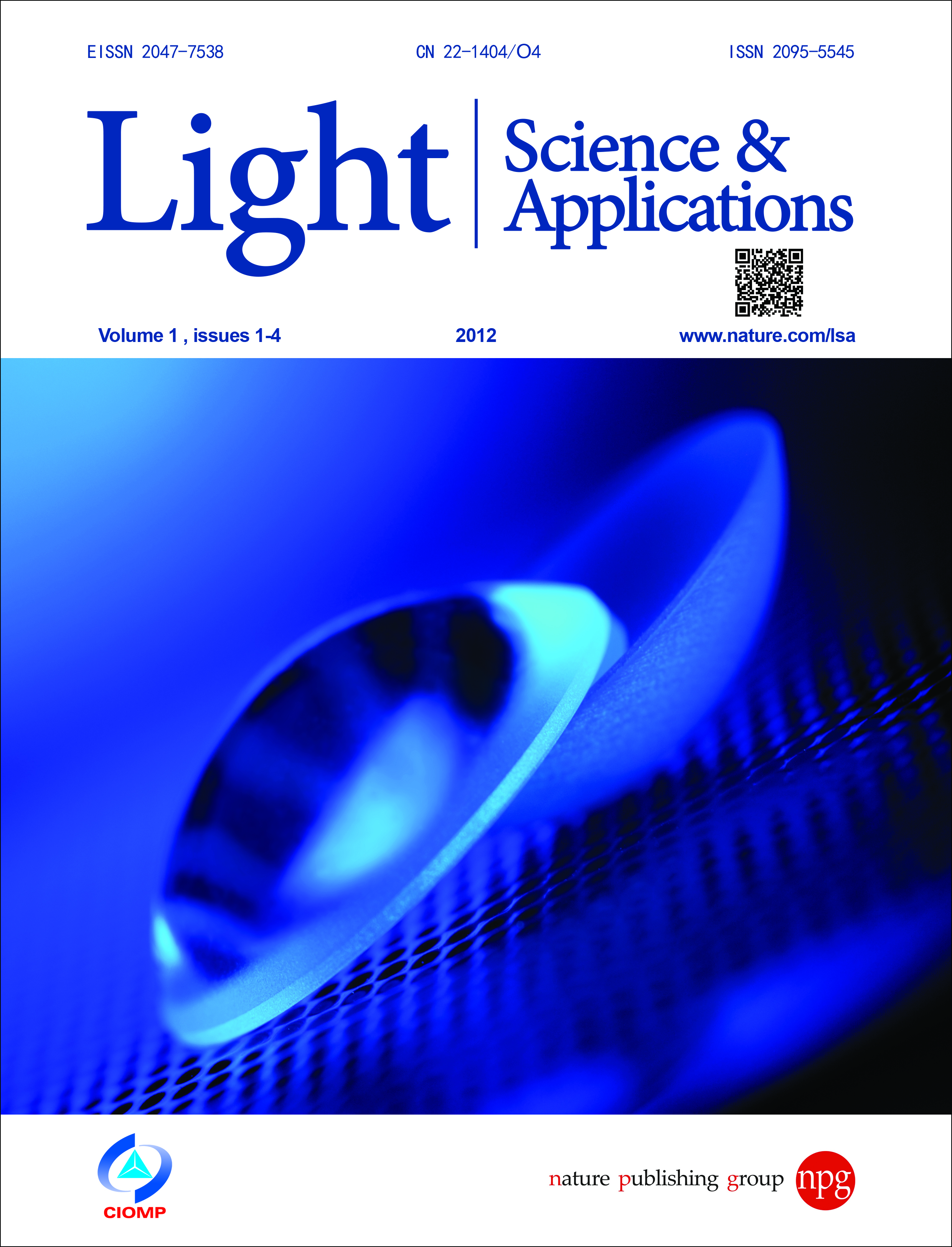
- Discipline: Photonics
- Language: English
- Edited by: Martin Booth, Yun-Feng Xiao

Publication details
- History: Since 2012
- Publisher: Nature Publishing Group on behalf of the Changchun Institute of Optics, Fine Mechanics and Physics, and the Chinese Optical Society
- Open access: Yes
- License: Creative Commons Attribution 4.0 International License
- Impact factor: 23.4 (2024)

Standard abbreviations
- ISO 4: Light Sci. Appl.

Indexing
- CODEN: LSAIAZ
- ISSN: 2095-5545 (print); 2047-7538 (web)
- LCCN: 2015234808
- OCLC no.: 1053804242

Links
- Journal homepage; Online access

Light: Science & Applications is a peer-reviewed open-access scientific journal published by the Nature Publishing Group on behalf of the Changchun Institute of Optics, Fine Mechanics and Physics, Chinese Academy of Sciences, and the Chinese Optical Society. It covers research on all aspects of optics. The journal was established in March 2012. The founding editor-in-chief was Jianlin Cao, who is now honorary editor-in-chief. As of 2026 the co-editors-in-chief are Martin Booth (University of Oxford) and Yun-Feng Xiao (Peking University).

== Abstracting and indexing ==
The journal is abstracted and indexed in:

- Chemical Abstracts Service
- Current Contents/Engineering, Computing & Technology
- Current Contents/Physical, Chemical & Earth Sciences
- EBSCO databases
- Ei Compendex
- Inspec
- Science Citation Index Expanded
- Scopus

According to the Journal Citation Reports, the journal has a 2024 impact factor of 23.4.
