= Chinese translation theory =

Theory of translation

Chinese translation theory was born out of contact with vassal states during the Zhou dynasty. It developed through translations of Buddhist scripture into Chinese. It is a response to the universals of the experience of translation and to the specifics of the experience of translating from specific source languages into Chinese. It also developed in the context of Chinese literary and intellectual tradition.

The Modern Standard Chinese word fanyi (翻譯; 'translate', 'translation') compounds fan "turn over; cross over; translate" and yi "translate; interpret". Some related synonyms are tongyi (通譯; 'interpret', 'translate'), chuanyi (傳譯; 'interpret', 'translate'), and zhuanyi (轉譯; 'translate', 'retranslate').

The Chinese classics contain various words meaning "interpreter; translator", for instance, sheren (舌人; 'tongue person') and fanshe (反舌; 'return tongue'). The Classic of Rites records four regional words: ji (寄; 'send', 'entrust', 'rely on') for the Dongyi (東夷; 'Eastern Yi-barbarians'), xiang (象; 'be like', 'resemble', 'image') for the Nanman (南蠻; 'Southern Man-barbarians'), didi (狄鞮; 'Di-barbarian boots') for the Xirong (西戎; 'Western Rong-barbarians'), and yi (譯; 'translate', 'interpret') for the Beidi (北狄; 'Northern Di-barbarians').

In those five regions, the languages of the people were not mutually intelligible, and their likings and desires were different. To make what was in their minds apprehended, and to communicate their likings and desires, (there were officers),—in the east, called transmitters; in the south, representationists; in the west, Tî-tîs; and in the north, interpreters. (王)

A Western Han work attributes a dialogue about translation to Confucius. Confucius advises a ruler who wishes to learn foreign languages not to bother. Confucius tells the ruler to focus on governance and let the translators handle translation.

The earliest bit of translation theory may be a phrase attributed to Confucius in the Guliang Zhuan: "names should follow their bearers, while things should follow China" (名從主人，物從中國). In other words, names should be transliterated, while things should be translated by meaning.

In the late Qing dynasty and the Republican period, reformers such as Liang Qichao, Hu Shih and Zhou Zuoren began looking at translation practice and theory of the great translators in Chinese history.

== Zhi Qian (3rd century AD) ==
Zhi Qian (支謙)'s preface (序) is the first work whose purpose is to express an opinion about translation practice. The preface was included in a work of the Liang dynasty. It recounts an historical anecdote of 224 AD, at the beginning of the Three Kingdoms period. A party of Buddhist monks came to Wuchang. One of them, Zhu Jiangyan by name, was asked to translate some passage from scripture. He did so, in rough Chinese. When Zhi Qian questioned the lack of elegance, another monk, named Vighna (維衹难), responded that the meaning of the Buddha should be translated simply, without loss, in an easy-to-understand manner: literary adornment is unnecessary. All present concurred and quoted two traditional maxims: Laozi's "beautiful words are untrue, true words are not beautiful" and Confucius's "speech cannot be fully recorded by writing, and speech cannot fully capture meaning".

Zhi Qian's own translations of Buddhist texts are elegant and literary, so the "direct translation" advocated in the anecdote is likely Vighna's position, not Zhi Qian's.

== Dao An (314 – 385 AD) ==
Dao An focused on loss in translation. His theory is the Five Forms of Loss (五失本):

1. Changing the word order. Sanskrit word order is free with a tendency to SOV. Chinese is SVO.
2. Adding literary embellishment where the original is in plain style.
3. Eliminating repetitiveness in argumentation and panegyric (頌文).
4. Cutting the concluding summary section (義說).
5. Cutting the recapitulative material in introductory section.

Dao An criticized other translators for loss in translation, asking: how would they feel if a translator cut out the boring parts of classics like the Shi Jing or the Classic of History?

He also expanded upon the difficulty of translation, with his theory of the Three Difficulties (三不易):

1. Communicating the Dharma to a different audience from the one the Buddha addressed.
2. Translating the words of a saint.
3. Translating texts which have been painstakingly composed by generations of disciples.

== Kumārajīva (344 – 413 AD) ==
Kumārajīva’s translation practice was to translate for meaning. The story goes that one day Kumārajīva criticized his disciple Sengrui for translating “heaven sees man, and man sees heaven” (天見人,人見天). Kumārajīva felt that “man and heaven connect, the two able to see each other” (人天交接,兩得相見) would be more idiomatic, though heaven sees man, man sees heaven is perfectly idiomatic.

In another tale, Kumārajīva discusses the problem of translating incantations at the end of sutras. In the original there is attention to aesthetics, but the sense of beauty and the literary form (dependent on the particularities of Sanskrit) are lost in translation. It is like chewing up rice and feeding it to people (嚼飯與人).

== Huiyuan (334 – 416 AD) ==
Huiyuan's theory of translation is middling, in a positive sense. It is a synthesis that avoids extremes of elegant (文雅) and plain (質樸). With elegant translation, "the language goes beyond the meaning" (文過其意) of the original. With plain translation, "the thought surpasses the wording" (理勝其辭). For Huiyuan, "the words should not harm the meaning" (文不害意). A good translator should “strive to preserve the original” (務存其本).

== Sengrui (371 – 438 AD) ==
Sengrui investigated problems in translating the names of things. This is of course an important traditional concern whose locus classicus is the Confucian exhortation to “rectify names” (正名). This is not merely of academic concern to Sengrui, for poor translation imperils Buddhism. Sengrui was critical of his teacher Kumarajiva's casual approach to translating names, attributing it to Kumarajiva's lack of familiarity with the Chinese tradition of linking names to essences (名實).

== Sengyou (445 – 518 AD) ==
Much of the early material of earlier translators was gathered by Sengyou and would have been lost but for him. Sengyou's approach to translation resembles Huiyuan's, in that both saw good translation as the middle way between elegance and plainness. However, unlike Huiyuan, Sengyou expressed admiration for Kumarajiva's elegant translations.

== Xuanzang (600 – 664 AD) ==
Xuanzang’s theory is the Five Untranslatables (五種不翻), or five instances where one should transliterate:

1. Secrets: Dhāraṇī 陀羅尼, Sanskrit ritual speech or incantations, which includes mantras.
2. Polysemy: Bhagavant 薄伽梵, which means sovereignty, ablaze, solemnity, fame, auspicious, esteemed.
3. None in China: jambu tree 閻浮樹, which does not grow in China.
4. Deference to the past: the translation for anuttara-samyak-saṃbodhi is already established as Anouputi 阿耨菩提.
5. To inspire respect and righteousness: Prajñā 般若 instead of “wisdom” (智慧).

== Yan Fu (1898) ==
Yan Fu is famous for his three criteria of translation that he identified as "Xin Da Ya" in the preface of his translation of Thomas Huxley’s "Evolution and Ethics." According to him, the three difficulties of translation are: faithfulness (信 xìn), being true to the original in spirit; expressiveness or transparency (達 dá), being accessible and intelligible to the target reader; and elegance (雅 yǎ), being aesthetically pleasing.

Of the three facets, Yan Fu judged expressiveness (達 dá) to be the most important one for his translation of "Evolution and Ethics", with the reasoning that if the meaning of the translated text is not understood by the reader, the translation is not useful.

In order to facilitate comprehension, word order should be changed, Chinese examples may replace original ones, and even people's names should be rendered Chinese. Yan Fu's criteria for translation are based on his experience with translating scientific works from English into Chinese. The typical misapplication of the criteria is to extend them to the translation of literary works and treat them as a universal theory of translation. In addition, two typical misinterpretations of the principles are: (a) interpreting accessibility as clarity or expressiveness, (b) overgeneralizing Yan Fu's specific readership to general readership.

According to Yan Fu, it is impossible to achieve all three aspects of Xin Da Ya at the same time and he instead only used these three metrics to better explain his final translation choices for "Evolution and Ethics". Despite these caveats, Yan Fu's Xin Da Ya criteria represented a new way of thinking about translations at the time and went on to influence translation approaches for more than half a century.

== Liang Qichao (1920) ==
Liang Qichao put these three qualities of a translation in the same order, fidelity first, then clarity, and only then elegance.

== Lin Yutang (1933) ==
Lin Yutang stressed the responsibility of the translator to the original, to the reader, and to art. To fulfill this responsibility, the translator needs to meet standards of fidelity (忠實), smoothness (通順) and beauty.

== Lu Xun (1935) ==
Lu Xun's most famous dictum relating to translation is "I'd rather be faithful than smooth" (寧信而不順).

== Ai Siqi (1937) ==
Ai Siqi described the relationships between fidelity, clarity and elegance in terms of Western ontology, where clarity and elegance are to fidelity as qualities are to being.

== Zhou Zuoren (1944) ==
Zhou Zuoren assigned weightings, 50% of translation is fidelity, 30% is clarity, and 20% elegance.

== Zhu Guangqian (1944) ==
Zhu Guangqian wrote that fidelity in translation is the root which you can strive to approach but never reach. This formulation perhaps invokes the traditional idea of returning to the root in Daoist philosophy.

== Fu Lei (1951) ==
Fu Lei held that translation is like painting: what is essential is not formal resemblance but rather spiritual resemblance (神似).

== Qian Zhongshu (1964) ==
Qian Zhongshu wrote that the highest standard of translation is transformation (化, the power of transformation in nature): bodies are sloughed off, but the spirit (精神), appearance and manner (姿致) are the same as before (故我, the old self).

== See also ==
- Geyi
- Translation

== Sources ==
- A History of Translation Theory in China (Chinese original by Chen Fukang 陳福康.中國譯學理論史稿.上海外語教育出版社)
