= Luo Xiangang =

Chinese engineer

- Born: December 1970 (age 55); Cangxi County, Sichuan, China
- Education: Sichuan Normal University
- Scientific career
- Fields: Photoelectric technology
- Workplaces: Institute of Optics and Electronics, Chinese Academy of Sciences

Chinese name
- Traditional Chinese: 羅先剛
- Simplified Chinese: 罗先刚
Transcriptions
Standard Mandarin
- Hanyu Pinyin: Luó Xiāngāng

Luo Xiangang (Chinese: 罗先刚; born December 1970) is a Chinese engineer specializing in photoelectric technology. He is an academician of the Chinese Academy of Engineering currently serves as director of the Institute of Optics and Electronics, Chinese Academy of Sciences.

== Biography ==
Luo was born in Cangxi County, Sichuan, in December 1970. He attended Qinglin Village School. He elementary studied at Baiqiao Town Middle School and secondary studied at Chengjiao High School. In 1989 he graduated from Mianyang Teachers' College. He holds a bachelor's degree from Sichuan Normal University, and master's and doctor's degrees from the Institute of Optics and Electronics, Chinese Academy of Sciences. He was a postdoctoral fellow at the Institute of Physical and Chemical Research between May 2001 and May 2002. He was also a research scientist at the institute from May 2001 to January 2005. He joined the Institute of Optics and Electronics, Chinese Academy of Sciences in December 2004.

== Honours and awards ==
- 2008 National Science Fund for Distinguished Young Scholars
- 2014 Fellow of the International Academy of Photonics and Laser Engineering (IAPLE)
- 2016 State Technological Invention Award (First Class)
- 2018 Fellow of the Chinese Optical Society (COS)
- 2019 Fellow of The Optical Society (OSA)
- 2019 Fellow of SPIE
- November 22, 2019 Member of the Chinese Academy of Engineering (CAE)
