= China Institute for Innovation and Development Strategy =

Think tank based in Beijing, China

- Abbreviation: CIIDS
- Formation: 2010; 16 years ago
- Affiliations: Ministry of State Security
- Website: www.ciids.cn

China Institute for Innovation and Development Strategy (CIIDS) is a research and policy institute based in Beijing, China, founded by Zheng Bijian and Lu Yongxiang in 2010. According to Alex Joske, a former researcher at the Australian Strategic Policy Institute, CIIDS is staffed by veterans of Ministry of State Security (MSS) influence operations and front organizations.

== History ==
CIIDS develops strategies for social governance, technology, and military institutions in China. In addition, CIIDS maintains cooperative relationships with the Berggruen Institute.

CIIDS has hosted events such as the Technology Expo the 2nd U.S.-China Strategic Forum on Clean Energy Cooperation, and the China Sciences and Humanities Forum.

At the 2013 Understanding China Conference participants had the opportunity to gain a firsthand glimpse into the mindset of China's new leadership during a rare, wide-ranging discussion with Xi Jinping, general secretary of the Chinese Communist Party (CCP) at the Great Hall of the People in early November on the eve of the recent Third Plenum of the 18th Central Committee of the Chinese Communist Party, which announced a broad array of reforms, e.g., including: Party general secretary Xi Jinping announced plans and policies such as ending labor camps, easing the one-child policy, and opening up new markets in China to the world.

=== Events ===
- The 2015 Understanding China Conference announced the "Belt and Road" policy and that China would host the G20 Summit in 2016 at Huangzhou.
- Technology Expo – sponsored by the CIIDS and co-organized by the Shanghai Institute for Reform, Innovation & Development Strategy, the expo provides a platform and athletic arena for domestic and foreign products, technologies, and ideas.
- 2nd US–China Strategic Forum on Clean Energy Cooperation – co-hosted by CIIDS and the Brookings Institution, according to its website the forum believes that: "The United States and China can advance the prospect of achieving climate-friendly economic growth if we can find pragmatic solutions to our societies' demand for clean energy."
- China Sciences and Humanities Forum – created by Lu Yongxiang and Zheng Bijian, the forum is co-hosted by the Graduate University of Chinese Academy of Sciences (GUCAS), the Higher Education Press, and CIIDS. The event invites senior Chinese government officials, foreign political leaders, and scholars to conduct extensive academic discussions about politics, science, technology, economics, and diplomacy.

== See also ==
- Made in China 2025
