= China's peaceful rise =

Chinese Communist Party foreign policy slogan

- Simplified Chinese: 中国和平崛起
- Traditional Chinese: 中國和平崛起
Transcriptions
Standard Mandarin
- Hanyu Pinyin: Zhōngguó hépíng juéqǐ
- Bopomofo: ㄓㄨㄥ ㄍㄨㄛ´ ㄏㄜ´ ㄆㄧㄥ´ ㄐㄩㄝ´ ㄑㄧˇ
- Tongyong Pinyin: Jhongguo heping jyueci
Hakka
- Romanization: Chûng-koet fò-phìn khiut hí
Yue: Cantonese
- Yale Romanization: Zūnggwok wòhpìhng gwahthéi

China's peaceful development
- Simplified Chinese: 中国和平发展
- Traditional Chinese: 中國和平發展
Transcriptions
Standard Mandarin
- Hanyu Pinyin: Zhōngguó hépíng fāzhǎn

"China's peaceful rise", officially referred to as "China's peaceful development" since 2004, is a political slogan and stated policy of the People's Republic of China (PRC) implemented under former General Secretary of the Chinese Communist Party Hu Jintao. It sought to assure the international community that China's growing political, diplomatic, economic, and military power would not pose a threat to international peace and security.

Originally formulated by Zheng Bijian as part of a Ministry of State Security (MSS) influence operation, the term characterized China as a responsible world leader that avoids unnecessary international confrontation, emphasizes soft power, and vows that China is committed to its own internal issues and improving the welfare of its own people before interfering in world affairs. Furthermore, it sought to rebut the "China threat theory" and reestablish the view of China as a non-threatening world power, as historically Chinese empires were regarded as less aggressive.

Among Chinese authorities as well as academics, there was disagreement about the term—particularly a concern that the word 'rise' might fuel perceptions that China was a threat to the current status quo. Therefore, since 2004, the term "China's peaceful development" has been used by the Chinese leadership.

== Origins ==
Many of the ideas behind the effort to promote the concept of the peaceful rise of the PRC came from the new security concept, which was formulated by think tanks in the PRC in the mid-1990s. During this time period, Chinese leaders became more careful with China's international image in the aftermath of the 1989 Tiananmen Square protests and massacre, particularly American views of China's growing role internationally.

The term itself was used in a speech given by the former Vice Principal of the Central Party School, Zheng Bijian, in late 2003 during the Boao Forum for Asia. Zheng had formulated the concept following a 2002 visit to the United States, where he heard what he deemed as frequent and unsettling references to China as a threat. He coined the term after working with the MSS to study American attitudes toward China. Zheng returned to China and proposed a study to develop a theory of China's peaceful rise. Premier Wen Jiabao became the first high-level leader to endorse the concept in December 2003, while speaking at Harvard University. It appears to be one of the first initiatives by the fourth generation of the leadership of the PRC, headed by Hu Jintao and Wen Jiabao.

In Zheng's speech he pointed out that in the past, a rise of a new power often resulted in drastic changes to global political structures, and even war (i.e. the hegemonic stability theory in international relations). He believed that this was because these powers "chose the road of aggression and expansion, which will ultimately fail." Zheng stated that China did not seek conquest or to follow a militarized path of development, but instead to seek reciprocity and mutual benefit in its foreign relations.

However, there was disagreement about the term 'peaceful rise' among the Chinese leadership and academia, particularly because the use of the word 'rise' could fuel perceptions that China is a threat. At the 2004 session of the Bo'ao Forum, the Chinese Communist Party's general secretary Hu Jintao used instead the phrase China's peaceful development. 'Peaceful development' has since been the definition generally used by senior officials, with 'peaceful rise' rarely heard.

Under the strategic paradigm of former CCP General Secretary Jiang Zemin, China's rapid development was viewed as a multipolarizing change that challenged the unipolarity of the world structure under the United States of America's hegemony. In contrast, according to Guo (2006), the Chinese adaptation of a peaceful development strategy entails an effort to secure a favorable environment for development by avoiding direct confrontation that challenges the current unipolar world but still maintaining its multilateral approach.

The 17th National Congress of the Chinese Communist Party made the "Peaceful Development" formulation official party doctrine.

== Main principle ==
The term is used primarily to reassure the nations of Continental and East Asia as well as the United States that the rise of China's military prominence and the growth of its economic strength will not pose a threat to peace and stability, and that other nations will benefit from China's rising power and influence. According to Robert Suettinger, "the concept of peaceful rise was initially intended as something of a propaganda campaign" and "should not necessarily be taken to have decisive significance for China's foreign policy."

In diplomacy, the doctrine calls for less assertiveness in border disputes such as those concerning the Spratly Islands, Senkaku Islands, and South Tibet. China still has difficult relations with Japan and continues a military modernization program.

== Sino-American relations ==
The end of the Jiang Zemin leadership marked a turning point in Sino-American relations. A pattern of cooperative coexistence became the new normal. "The United States and China perceived that they needed each other because both were too large to be dominated, too special to be transformed, and too necessary to each other to be able to afford isolation." Chinese leader Hu Jintao and Premier Wen Jiabao brought a perspective that was unprecedented in the management of China's development and in defining its role in the world. They represented the first crop of Chinese leaders with no personal experience with the Cultural Revolution and the first to assume power in a China that unambiguously was emerging as a great power. "Coming to power during a long period of sustained domestic growth and in the wake of China's entry into the international economic order, they assumed the helm of a China undeniably "arriving" as a world power, with interests in every corner of the globe."

According to Henry Kissinger in his book On China, Zheng Bijian provided the "quasi-official" policy statement for China in a 2005 Foreign Affairs article. Zheng promised that China had adopted a "strategy...to transcend the traditional ways for great powers to emerge." China sought a "new international political and economic order," but it was "one that can be achieved through incremental reforms and the democratization of international relations." China would "not follow the path of Germany leading up to World War I or those of Germany and Japan leading up to World War II, when these countries violently plundered resources and pursued hegemony. Neither will China follow the path of the great powers vying for global domination during the Cold War."

Australian analyst Alex Joske described the doctrine as disseminated by sustained Ministry of State Security influence operations in the U.S.

Washington responded by describing China as a "responsible stakeholder" in the international system. In a 2005 speech at the National Committee on United States—China Relations, Robert Zoellick, then Deputy Secretary of State, put forward the American response to Zheng's article, which "amounted to an invitation to China to become a privileged member, and shaper, of the international system."

State Councilor Dai Bingguo argues that China's development is not some trick where it 'hides its brightness and bides its time," or a naïve delusion that forfeits China's advantages. "Persisting with taking the path of peaceful development is not the product of a subjective imagination or of some kind of calculations. Rather, it is the result of our profound recognition that both the world today and China today have undergone tremendous changes as well as that China's relations with the world today have also undergone great changes; hence it is necessary to make the best of the situation and adapt to the changes."

Dai rejects arguments that claim China will seek to dominate East Asia and the Greater Asia-Pacific or to displace the United States as the world's preeminent power as "pure myths" that contradict China's historical record and its current policies. He includes a striking invitation for the world to "supervise" China to confirm it would never seek hegemony: "Comrade Deng Xiaoping once stated: If one day China should seek to claim hegemony in the world, then the people of the world should expose, oppose and even fight against it. On this point, the international community can supervise us."

== Government white papers ==
The State Council of the People's Republic of China issued a white paper China's Peaceful Development Road in 2005, to define China's peaceful development strategy. It has five chapters:

1. China is the largest developing country, and economic development according to globalization is China's main goal. China seeks a multipolar world rather than hegemony, and seeks relations with other countries based on the "Five Principles of Peaceful Coexistence".
2. A peaceful international environment is essential for China's development. China's development is a major part of global development, as China has factored in world gains in poverty reduction, and strives to reduce its energy consumption. China's growth has lessened the effects of the Great Recession.
3. China will develop according to science. It will develop its domestic market and pave a new path to industrialization that is cleaner, and makes more use of information technology and innovation by exploiting its human capital through education.
4. China will remain open to the outside world for trade. It will promote organizations like the World Trade Organization, and support regional integration through institutions like the ASEAN–China Free Trade Area. It will address trade and exchange rate conflicts on an equal footing with other countries. China will invest abroad and maintain its large labor force and exports for use abroad.
5. China will promote "democracy in international relations"; with countries interacting on an equal footing through dialog and multilateralism and not coercion. China will promote the full participation of developing countries in international affairs, and also help them develop themselves. There should be trust and not a "Cold War mentality", and arms control and nuclear disarmament should be pursued. China will resolve its remaining border disputes peacefully.

Another white paper with the title China’s Peaceful Development was released in September 2011. It emphasized, "The central goal of China's diplomacy is to create a peaceful and stable international environment for its development."

== Other discourse ==
Some proponent's of the peaceful rise idea relate it to the historical experience of Zheng He's voyages.

== See also ==
- China threat theory
- Chinese Century
- Foreign relations of China
- Great Divergence
- Military budget of China
- The Rise of the Great Powers
- Thucydides Trap
- Peaceful Evolution theory
