= Institute of Optics and Electronics =

Chinese science research institute

Institute of Optics and Electronics, Chinese Academy of Sciences
- Founded: 1970
- Type: Professional organization
- Purpose: Optics; Electronics
- Location: Shuangliu District, Chengdu, Sichuan, China
- Region served: China
- Members: 1,200
- Key people: Luo Xiangang
- Website: english.ioe.cas.cn

The Institute of Optics and Electronics of the Chinese Academy of Sciences (simplified Chinese: 中国科学院光电技术研究所; traditional Chinese: 中國科學院光電技術研究所; pinyin: Zhoōngguó Kēxuéyuàn Guāngdiàn Jìshù Yánjiūsuǒ) is a Chinese science research institute located in the town of Wenxing, Shuangliu District of Chengdu, in southwest China's Sichuan province. It is the largest institute of Chinese Academy of Sciences (CAS) in southwest China, founded in 1970. It is a diversified organization with operations in photoelectric tracking measurement, beam control, adaptive optics, astronomical target photoelectric observation and recognition, advanced optical manufacturing, aerospace photoelectric equipment, micro nano optics, microelectronics optics, and biomedical optics. It has more than 1,200 staff, including 2 academicians of the Chinese Academy of Engineering (CAE), 1 winner of National Science Fund for Outstanding Young Scholars, 1 recruitment program of global experts, 1 chief scientist of National 973 Program, 8 state-level experts in the field of opto-electronics, 13 academic and technological research leaders in Sichuan, and 350 senior S&T personnel.

== History ==
The Institute of Optics and Electronics, Chinese Academy of Sciences was founded in 1970.

== Laboratories ==
Nine Chinese state key laboratories are now under the Institute of Optics and Electronics, such as State Key Laboratory of Optical Technologies for Micro fabrication, CAS Key labs on Beam Control, Adaptive Optics, and Chengdu Measurement and Testing laboratory for Geometrical Parameter and CAS Photoelectric Precision Mechanics.

== Leaders ==
=== Directors ===
No.	English name	Chinese name	Took office	Left office	Notes
1	Gao Fuhui	高福晖	July 1980	February 1984	
2	Zhang Litang	张礼堂	July 1983	September 1995	
3	Ma Jiaguang	马佳光	September 1995	December 1999	
4	Yao Hanmin	姚汉民	December 1999	December 2003	
5	Zhang Yudong	张雨东	December 2003	November 2015	
6	Luo Xiangang	罗先刚	November 2018		

=== Communist Party Secretaries ===
No.	English name	Chinese name	Took office	Left office	Notes
1	Liu Yunzhong	刘允中	February 1974	December 1980	
2	Hou Huiren	侯惠仁	March 1981	February 1984	
3	Xu Lianshan	许连山	February 1984	June 1987	
4	Tian Yu	田瑜	June 1987	December 1996	
5	Chen Shengli	陈胜利	November 2000	September 2011	
6	Yang Hu	杨虎	September 2011		
