= Hao Ping =

Chinese historian and academic administrator

- 郝平
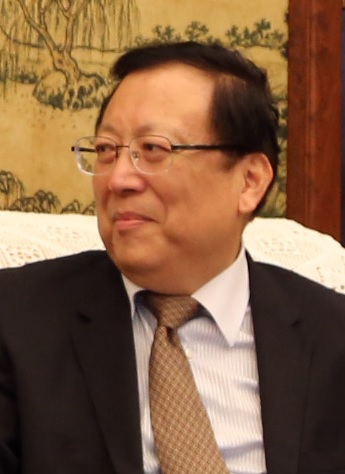
- Hao in 2017

Communist Party Secretary of Peking University
- Incumbent
- Assumed office June 2022
- Preceded by: Qiu Shuiping
- In office December 2016 – October 2018
- Preceded by: Zhu Shanlu
- Succeeded by: Qiu Shuiping

President of Peking University
- In office 23 October 2018 – June 2022
- Preceded by: Lin Jianhua
- Succeeded by: Gong Qihuang

President of Beijing Foreign Studies University
- In office June 2005 – September 2010
- Preceded by: Chen Naifang
- Succeeded by: Chen Yulu

Personal details
- Born: 7 June 1958 (age 68) Qingdao, Shandong, China
- Party: Chinese Communist
- Education: Peking University (BA, LLD); University of Hawaiʻi (MA)
- Occupation: Academic administrator

Hao Ping (Chinese: 郝平; born 15 September 1959) is a Chinese historian and academic administrator who has served as the party secretary of Peking University since June 2022. He served as president of Peking University from 2018 to 2022, Chinese vice minister of education from 2009 to 2016, and president of Beijing Foreign Studies University from 2005 to 2009.

== Education ==
Hao Ping received a Bachelor of History with a major in history from Peking University in 1982, a Master of Arts in history from the University of Hawaiʻi in 1995, and a Doctor of Laws in international relations from Peking University in 1999.

== Curriculum vitae ==
- 1978-1982 Undergraduate studies (Bachelor of History), Peking University
- 1982-1986 Staff member in office of the President, Peking University
- 1986-1991 Deputy Director, Office of Student Affairs, Peking University
- 1991-1992 Visiting Scholar, Center for Chinese Studies, University of Hawaii, USA
- 1992-1995 Postgraduate studies (M.A. in history), University of Hawaiʻi
- 1995-2001 Concurrently served as Director of Office of International Programs, Assistant President of PKU (Apr 1997), Deputy Secretary-General of PKU Education Foundation (Sep 1998), and Executive Member of the CPC Standing Committee of PKU (Feb 1999)
- 1995-1999 Doctoral studies (LL.D. in international relations), Peking University
- 2001-2005 Vice President of Peking University and Executive Member of the CPC Standing Committee of PKU
- 2005-2009 President, Beijing Foreign Studies University
- 2009- Vice Minister of Education, Executive Member of the CPC Leading Group of Ministry of Education, Director of Chinese National Commission for UNESCO

Hao is a Deputy to the National Committee of the 11th Chinese People's Political Consultative Conference.

== Publications ==
- Hao Ping, 无奈的结局 : 司徒雷登与中国 [An Unfortunate Ending: John Leighton Stuart and China]. (Peking University Press, 2011).
- Hao Ping, Sun Yat-sen and America (Foreign Language Teaching & Research Press, 2012).
- Hao Ping, Peking University and the Origins of Higher Education in China ([Peking University Press, 2nd ed., 2008] Bridge21 Publications, 2013).

Educational offices
Preceded by Chen Naifang (陈乃芳)	President of Beijing Foreign Studies University; 2005–2010	Succeeded by Chen Yulu
Preceded by Lin Jianhua	President of Peking University; 2018	Succeeded by Gong Qihuang
Party political offices
Preceded by Zhu Shanlu	Communist Party Secretary of Peking University; 2016–2018	Succeeded by Qiu Shuiping
Preceded by Qiu Shuiping	Communist Party Secretary of Peking University; 2022–present	Incumbent
