= Yu Yunyao =

Chinese politician

- 虞云耀

Executive Vice President of the Central Party School of the Chinese Communist Party
- In office March 2002 – June 2006
- President: Zeng Qinghong
- Preceded by: Zheng Bijian
- Succeeded by: Su Rong

Personal details
- Born: May 1941 (age 85) Danyang County, Jiangsu, China
- Party: Chinese Communist Party
- Education: Tsinghua University; Harbin Military Academy of Engineering

Chinese name
- Simplified Chinese: 虞云耀
- Traditional Chinese: 虞雲耀
Transcriptions
Standard Mandarin
- Hanyu Pinyin: Yú Yúnyào

Yu Yunyao (Chinese: 虞云耀; born May 1941) is a Chinese politician who served as executive vice president of the Central Party School of the Chinese Communist Party from 2002 to 2006. He was a member of the 16th Central Committee of the Chinese Communist Party. He was a member of the Standing Committee of the 9th National People's Congress and a delegate to the 11th National People's Congress.

== Biography ==
Yu was born in Danyang County (now Danyang), Jiangsu, in May 1941. He graduated from Tsinghua University and Harbin Military Academy of Engineering.

He joined the Chinese Communist Party (CCP) in December 1961. He worked in the Second Ministry of Machine Building for a long time, from 1964 to 1980. He was assigned to the Organization Department of the Chinese Communist Party in June 1980. He moved up the ranks to become deputy head in November 1994. He was dispatched to the Central Party School of the Chinese Communist Party in July 2001, becoming vice president in July 2001 and executive vice president in March 2002. In March 2008, he took office as vice chairperson of the National People's Congress Overseas Chinese Affairs Committee, a position at ministerial level.

== Publications ==
- 虞云耀自选集 [Yu Yunyao's Selected Works] (in Chinese). Beijing: Learning Publishing House. 2007. ISBN 9787801165992.
- 片羽集 [Pian Yu Ji] (in Chinese). Beijing: Party Building Reading Press. 2011. ISBN 9787509902431.
- 三个代表重要思想概论 [Introduction to the Important Thought of Three Represents] (in Chinese). Beijing: CCP Central Party School Press. 2006. ISBN 9787503533259.
- 加强党的执政能力建设 [Strengthen the Governance Capacity of the Party] (in Chinese). Beijing: Learning Publishing House. 2006. ISBN 9787800988516.
- 党校工作：实践与思考 [Party School Work: Practice and Thinking] (in Chinese). Beijing: CCP Central Party School Press. 2007. ISBN 9787503536618.
- Yu Yunyao; Yang Chungui (2002). 中共中央党校讲稿选关于马克思主义基本问题 [On the Basic Problems of Marxism] (in Chinese). Beijing: CCP Central Party School Press. ISBN 9787503524998.
- Yu Yunyao; Yang Chungui (2002). 中共中央党校讲稿选关于当代世界重大问题 [On Major Issues in the Contemporary World] (in Chinese). Beijing: CCP Central Party School Press. ISBN 9787503525094.

Educational offices
Preceded by Zheng Bijian	Executive Vice President of the Central Party School of the Chinese Communist Party; 2002–2006	Succeeded by Su Rong
