= Xu Zhihong =

Chinese botanist (born 1942)

- 许智宏

President of Peking University
- In office November 1999 – November 2008
- Preceded by: Chen Jia'er
- Succeeded by: Zhou Qifeng

Personal details
- Born: October 14, 1942 (age 83) Wuxi, Jiangsu, China
- Education: Peking University
- Scientific career
- Fields: Botany
- Workplaces: Peking University

Xu Zhihong (simplified Chinese: 许智宏; traditional Chinese: 許智宏; pinyin: Xǔ Zhìhóng, born 1942) is a Chinese botanist and former President of Peking University. He is a former vice-president of the Chinese Academy of Sciences. In 2009, Zhihong was conferred upon the award of Hilal-i-Quaid-i-Azam in recognition of his services to Pakistan. Asteroid 90826 Xuzhihong, discovered by the Beijing Schmidt CCD Asteroid Program in 1995, was named in his honor. The official naming citation was published by the Minor Planet Center on 4 October 2009 (M.P.C. 67219).

Educational offices
Preceded by Chen Jiaer	President of Peking University; 1999–2008	Succeeded by Zhou Qifeng
