= Zhou Xuhong =

Chinese physicist and educator

- 周绪红

President of Chongqing University
- In office 24 June 2013 – December 2017
- Preceded by: Lin Jianhua
- Succeeded by: Zhang Zongyi

President of Lanzhou University
- In office May 2006 – 24 June 2013
- Preceded by: Li Fashen
- Succeeded by: Wang Cheng

President of Chang'an University
- In office May 2002 – July 2006
- Preceded by: Chen Yinsan
- Succeeded by: Ma Jian

Personal details
- Born: October 1956 (age 69–70) Nan County, Hunan, China
- Party: Chinese Communist Party
- Education: Hunan University
- Occupation: Physicist, Educator

Zhou Xuhong (simplified Chinese: 周绪红; traditional Chinese: 周緒紅; pinyin: Zhōu Xùhóng; born October 1956) is a Chinese physicist and educator. He is the current . He previously served as president of Chang'an University from May 2002 to July 2006, president of Lanzhou University between May 2006 to June 2013, and president of Chongqing University from June 2013 to December 2017.

He is a member of the Chinese Academy of Engineering.

== Biography ==
Zhou was born and raised in Nan County, Hunan. After high school, he worked at Hunan Beizhouzi Farm, during the Cultural Revolution. After the Resumption of University Entrance Examination in 1977, he entered Hunan University and received his Doctor of Engineering there. After graduating in 1982, he worked as an Assistant Engineer in the Fifth Engineering Bureau of the Chinese Construction. He joined the Department of Civil Engineering faculty of Hunan University in June 1986 and was promoted to professor in May 1996. He served as director of Hunan University's graduate department from September 1997 to August 1999 and the university's vice-president from August 1999 to May 2002.

He became the president of Chang'an University in May 2002, and served until July 2006.

In May 2006, he was appointed the president of Lanzhou University, he remained in that position until June 24, 2013, when he was transferred to Chongqing and appointed the president of Chongqing University.

Zhou was elected a fellow of the Chinese Academy of Engineering in December 2011.

In December 2013, he was recruited by Central South University as an honorary professor.

Educational offices
Preceded by Chen Yinsan (陈荫三)	President of Chang'an University; 2002–2006	Succeeded by Ma Jian (马建)
Preceded by Li Fashen (李发伸)	President of Lanzhou University; 2006–2013	Succeeded by Wang Cheng (王乘)
Preceded by Lin Jianhua	President of Chongqing University; June 2013–2017	Succeeded by Zhang Zongyi (张宗益)
