= Wang Enge =

Chinese physicist and university administrator

- 王恩哥

President of Peking University
- In office March 2013 – February 2015
- Preceded by: Zhou Qifeng
- Succeeded by: Lin Jianhua

Personal details
- Born: 24 January 1957 (age 69) Shenyang, Liaoning, China
- Party: Chinese Communist Party
- Education: Liaoning University; Peking University
- Occupation: Physicist
- Scientific career
- Fields: Physics
- Workplaces: Peking University; Chinese Academy of Sciences (CAS)

Wang Enge (Chinese: 王恩哥; pinyin: Wāng ēngē; born 24 January 1957) is a Chinese physicist and academician of the Chinese Academy of Sciences. He succeeded Zhou Qifeng to the office of the President of Peking University on 22 March 2013. From 15 February 2015, he becomes the Vice President of Chinese Academy of Sciences.

== Early life ==
Wang was born into a wealthy and highly educated family in Shenyang, Liaoning. During the Down to the Countryside Movement, he became a sent-down youth in Liaozhong County. After the Cultural Revolution, he was accepted to Liaoning University in December 1977, obtaining a B.S. and M.S. in theoretical physics. Before graduation, Wang went to study in America at Princeton University. Wang received his Ph.D. from Peking University in July 1990. In January 1992, Wang attended the University of Lille Nord de France.

== Career ==
In 2007, Wang was elected an academician of the Chinese Academy of Sciences, at the age of 50. In 2009, Wang served as the President of School of Physics of Peking University. On 22 March 2013, Wang was promoted to become the President of Peking University. He is a recipient of the 2005 TWAS Prize. Wang also received the Advanced Materials Laureate in 2018. He is also the Academy of Sciences for the Developing World (2008), a Senior Fellow of Hong Kong Institute for Advanced Study (2019), a Fellow of the American Physical Society (2006), and a Fellow of the Institute of Physics (2003).

== Work ==
- Y. Guo, Y.F. Zhang, X.Y. Bao, T.Z. Han, Z. Tang, L.X. Zhang, W.G. Zhu, E.G. Wang, Q. Niu, Z.Q. Qiu, J.F. Jia, Z.X Zhao, and Q.K. Xue, Science 306, 1915 (2004), Superconductivity modulated by quantum size effects.
- G. Y. Zhang, X.D. Bai, X. Jiang, and E.G. Wang, Science 303, 766d (2004), Tubular Graphite Cones -Response.
- G. Y. Zhang, X. Jiang, and E.G. Wang, Science 300, 472 (2003), Tubular Graphite Cones.
- Xiaolin Li, Guangyu Zhang, Xuedong Bai, Xiaoming Sun, Xinran Wang, Enge Wang and Hongjie Dai, Nature Nanotechnology 3, 538(2008), Highly conducting graphene sheets and Langmuir–Blodgett films.

Educational offices
Preceded by Ye Yanlin	Dean of the School of Physics, Peking University; 2009–2011	Succeeded by Xincheng Xie
Preceded by Zhou Qifeng	President of Peking University; 2013–2015	Succeeded by Lin Jianhua
Awards
Preceded by Xue Qikun/ Chen Xi/ Ma Xucun	Recipient of the Mathematical Science Award of the Chen Jiageng Science Award; 2014	Succeeded by Xiangyu Zhou
