= Xin Da Ya =

Criteria in Chinese translation

- Traditional Chinese: 信達雅
- Simplified Chinese: 信达雅
Transcriptions
Standard Mandarin
- Hanyu Pinyin: Xìn Dá Yǎ
- Bopomofo: ㄒ一ㄣˋㄉㄚˊ一ㄚˇ
- Wade–Giles: Hsin^{4} Ta^{2} Ya^{3}

Xin Da Ya is a set of translation criteria put forward by Yan Fu in the preface to his 1898 translation of Thomas Huxley’s Evolution and Ethics (天演論). In the preface, Yan Fu stated that "there are three things hard to achieve in translation: faithfulness, fluency, and elegance" (譯事三難：信達雅):

- Xin "信" (faithfulness) - the meaning in the target language should be faithful to the meaning of the original
- Da "達" (fluency or expressiveness) - the translated text should be intelligible and in accordance with the language rules of the target language
- Ya "雅" (elegance) - a translation should be aesthetically pleasing

Of the three, Yan Fu identified Da (fluency) as the most important criteria for his translation of Evolution and Ethics, since he believed that a translation that was not understood by its reader was useless. Yan Fu did not set these criteria as general standards for translation, and he considered it impossible to achieve all three aspects of Xin Da Ya at the same time. Nonetheless, Xin Da Ya was revolutionary for its time and marked a new era in Chinese translation. In modern times, it has been surpassed by translation approaches such as Skopos theory and corpus linguistics that better serve the needs of contemporary translation users, particularly commercial clients. However, Xin Da Ya continues to be useful when used to complement Western translation theories.

== See also ==
- Chinese translation theory
- Phono-semantic matching
