= Yang Guanghua =

Chinese chemist and chemical engineer

Yang Guanghua or Guang-Hwa Yang (Chinese: 杨光华; 1923–2006), was a Chinese chemist and chemical engineer. He was the President of China University of Petroleum, and a pioneer of China's oil industry.

== Biography ==
Yang was born in Liuyang, Hunan, on 10 April 1923. In 1945, he graduated from the Department of Chemical Engineering of Zhejiang University in Hangzhou. He was a teaching assistant in the same department. In 1948, Yang went to study in the United States, and obtained his Doctor of Engineering degree from the University of Wisconsin–Madison in 1951.

Yang went back to China in May 1951. Yang was a professor at Peking University and Tsinghua University. In 1953, Yang joined to found the Beijing Petroleum College (北京石油学院; predecessor of current China University of Petroleum). In 1956, Yang was a visiting researcher at Moscow Petroleum Institute, USSR. In 1965, Yang was pointed Vice-president of Beijing Petroleum College. After 1969, Yang was Vice-president, later President of East China Petroleum College (华东石油学院). From 1988 to 1992, Yang was the President of China University of Petroleum (CUP), a national key university. Yang died in Beijing on 11 November 2006 at age 83. Yang donated his books and academic collections to the library of CUP.

In the 1950s, Yang and Prof. Wu Chi (武迟) co-founded the first educational program of oil and natural gas engineering/refining in China.

Yang's son Yang Wei, a mechanical engineer, served as President of Zhejiang University.

== Honors ==
Asteroid 10410 Yangguanghua, discovered by the Beijing Schmidt CCD Asteroid Program in 1997, is named in his memory. The official naming citation was published by the Minor Planet Center on 26 October 2018 (M.P.C. 112427).
