= Xiangyu Zhou =

Chinese mathematician

- 周向宇
- Born: March 1965 (age 61); Chenzhou, Hunan, China
- Education: Xiangtan University
- Scientific career
- Fields: Several complex variables Complex geometry
- Workplaces: Institute of Mathematics and Systems Science, Chinese Academy of Sciences

Xiangyu Zhou (Zhou Xiangyu, Chinese: 周向宇; pinyin: Zhōu Xiàngyǔ, born March 1965) is a Chinese mathematician, specializing in several complex variables and complex geometry. He is known for his 1998 proof of the "extended future tube conjecture", which was an unsolved problem for almost forty years.

== Education and career ==
Zhou was born in March 1965 in Chenzhou, Hunan. Zhou matriculated in 1981 at Xiangtan University, where he graduated in 1985 with a bachelor's degree in mathematics. From 1985 to 1990 he studied at the Institute of Mathematics of the Chinese Academy of Sciences, where he received an M.Sc. in 1988 and a Ph.D. in 1990. At Beijing's Institute of Mathematics of the Chinese Academy of Sciences he was from 1990 to 1992 an assistant professor and from 1992 to 1998 an associate professor and is since 1998 a full professor. During 1990 to 1992 he was on academic leave as a senior scientific member of the Steklov Mathematical Institute, where he was awarded in 1998 a Russian Doctor of Sciences degree.

In the Chinese Academy of Sciences, Zhou was from 2003 to 2012 the director of the Institute of Mathematics and is since 2008 the director of the Hua Loo-Keng Key Laboratory of Mathematics. From 2008 to 2011 he was the vice-chair of the Chinese Mathematical Society.

Zhou was awarded in 1999 the First Class Prize of the Natural Science Award of the Chinese Academy of Sciences, in 2001 the S.S. Chern Mathematics Prize of the Chinese Mathematical Society, and in 2004 the National Natural Science Award of China of the State Council of China. In 2002 he was an invited speaker at the International Congress of Mathematicians in Beijing. In 2013 he was elected an Academician by the Chinese Academy of Sciences and was a keynote speaker of the Abel Symposium.

== Selected publications ==
- Zhou, Xiangyu (2003). "Some results related to group actions in several complex variables". arXiv:math/0304337.
- Guan, Qiʼan; Zhou, Xiangyu; Zhu, Langfeng (2011). "On the Ohsawa–Takegoshi extension theorem and the twisted Bochner–Kodaira identity". Comptes Rendus Mathematique. 349 (13–14): 797–800. doi:10.1016/j.crma.2011.06.001.
- Zhu, Langfeng; Guan, Qiʼan; Zhou, Xiangyu (2012). "On the Ohsawa–Takegoshi $L^2$ extension theorem and the Bochner–Kodaira identity with non-smooth twist factor". Journal de Mathématiques Pures et Appliquées. 97 (6): 579–601. doi:10.1016/j.matpur.2011.09.010.
- Guan, Qiʼan; Zhou, Xiangyu (2012). "Optimal constant problem in the extension theorem". Comptes Rendus Mathematique. 350 (15–16): 753–756. doi:10.1016/j.crma.2012.08.007.
- Guan, Qi'an; Zhou, Xiangyu (2013). "Strong openness conjecture for plurisubharmonic functions". arXiv:1311.3781 [math.CV].
- Guan, Qi'an; Zhou, Xiangyu (2015). "A proof of Demailly's strong openness conjecture". Annals of Mathematics. 182 (2): 605–616. doi:10.4007/annals.2015.182.2.5. JSTOR 24523344.
- Guan, Qi'an; Zhou, Xiangyu (2015). "A solution of an $L^2$ extension problem with an optimal estimate and applications". Annals of Mathematics. 181 (3): 1139–1208. arXiv:1310.7169. doi:10.4007/annals.2015.181.3.6. JSTOR 24523356. S2CID 56205818.
- Guan, Qi'an; Zhou, Xiangyu (2015). "Effectiveness of Demailly's strong openness conjecture and related problems". Inventiones Mathematicae. 202 (2): 635–676. arXiv:1403.7247. Bibcode:2015InMat.202..635G. doi:10.1007/s00222-014-0575-3. S2CID 119317767.
- Guan, Qi'An; Zhou, Xiangyu (2015). "Optimal constant in an $L^2$ extension problem and a proof of a conjecture of Ohsawa". Science China Mathematics. 58 (1): 35–59. arXiv:1412.0054. Bibcode:2015ScChA..58...35G. doi:10.1007/s11425-014-4946-4. S2CID 119139395.
- Guan, Qi'an; Zhou, Xiangyu (2015). "Characterization of multiplier ideal sheaves with weights of Lelong number one". Advances in Mathematics. 285: 1688–1705. arXiv:1411.6737. doi:10.1016/j.aim.2015.08.002. S2CID 118853973.
- Guan, Qi'An; Zhou, Xiangyu (2017). "Strong openness of multiplier ideal sheaves and optimal $L^2$ extension". Science China Mathematics. 60 (6): 967–976. arXiv:1703.08387. doi:10.1007/s11425-017-9055-5. S2CID 119150408.
- Zhou, Xiangyu; Zhu, Langfeng (2018). "An optimal $L^2$ extension theorem on weakly pseudoconvex Kähler manifolds". Journal of Differential Geometry. 110. doi:10.4310/jdg/1536285628. S2CID 125514454. 2018
- Deng, Fusheng; Wang, Zhiwei; Zhang, Liyou; Zhou, Xiangyu (2018). "New characterizations of plurisubharmonic functions and positivity of direct image sheaves". arXiv:1809.10371 [math.CV].
- Zhou, Xiangyu; Zhu, Langfeng (2019). "Extension of cohomology classes and holomorphic sections defined on subvarieties". arXiv:1909.08822 [math.CV].
- Zhou, Xiangyu; Zhu, Langfeng (2020). "Siu's lemma, optimal $L^2$ extension and applications to twisted pluricanonical sheaves". Mathematische Annalen. 377 (1–2): 675–722. doi:10.1007/s00208-018-1783-8. S2CID 126209780.
- Guan, Qi'an; Zhou, Xiangyu (2020). "Restriction formula and subadditivity property related to multiplier ideal sheaves". Journal für die Reine und Angewandte Mathematik. 2020 (769): 1–33. doi:10.1515/crelle-2019-0043. S2CID 213427163.

Awards
Preceded by Wang Enge	Recipient of the Mathematical Science Award of the Chen Jiageng Science Award; 2016	Succeeded by Gao Hongjun
