= Lin Jianhua =

Chinese chemist

- 林建华

President of Peking University
- In office February 2015 – 23 October 2018
- Preceded by: Wang Enge
- Succeeded by: Hao Ping

President of Zhejiang University
- In office June 2013 – February 2015
- Preceded by: Yang Wei
- Succeeded by: Wu Zhaohui

President of Chongqing University
- In office December 2010 – June 2013
- Preceded by: Li Xiaohong
- Succeeded by: Zhou Xuhong

Personal details
- Born: October 1955 (age 70–71) Baotou, Inner Mongolia, China
- Party: Chinese Communist Party
- Education: Peking University
- Occupation: Chemist, educator

Lin Jianhua (simplified Chinese: 林建华; traditional Chinese: 林建華; pinyin: Lín Jiànhuá; born October 1955) is a Chinese chemist who served as president of Peking University from 2015 to 2018. Previously he was president of Chongqing University from December 2010 to June 2013, and president of Zhejiang University between June 2013 to February 2015.

== Life and career ==
Lin was born and raised in Baotou, Inner Mongolia, with his ancestral home in Gaomi, Shandong. During the Cultural Revolution, he taught at a school in Jalaid Banner, Inner Mongolia. He earned a doctorate in chemistry from Peking University in 1986. He studied at Max Planck Institute for Solid State Research, Iowa State University, and Ames Laboratory from 1988 to 1993.

Lin taught at Peking University since 1986, he became a professor at the College of Chemistry and Molecular Engineering, Peking University (CCME) in August 1995. In July 1997 he became deputy dean of the College of the CCME, rising to president in April 2001. He became the vice-president of Peking University in September 2002, executive vice-president of Peking University in December 2004.

He was honored as a Distinguished Young Scholar by the National Science Fund for Distinguished Young Scholars in 1997.

In December 2010 he was promoted to become the president of Chongqing University, a position he held until June 2013. Then he was appointed the president of Zhejiang University, he remained in that position until February 2015, when he was transferred to Beijing and appointed the president of Peking University.

Educational offices
Preceded by Li Xiaohong	President of Chongqing University; 2010–2013	Succeeded by Zhou Xuhong
Preceded by Yang Wei	President of Zhejiang University; 2013–2015	Succeeded by Wu Zhaohui
Preceded by Wang Enge	President of Peking University; 2015–2018	Succeeded by Hao Ping
