= Zhou Qifeng =

Chinese chemist

- 周其凤
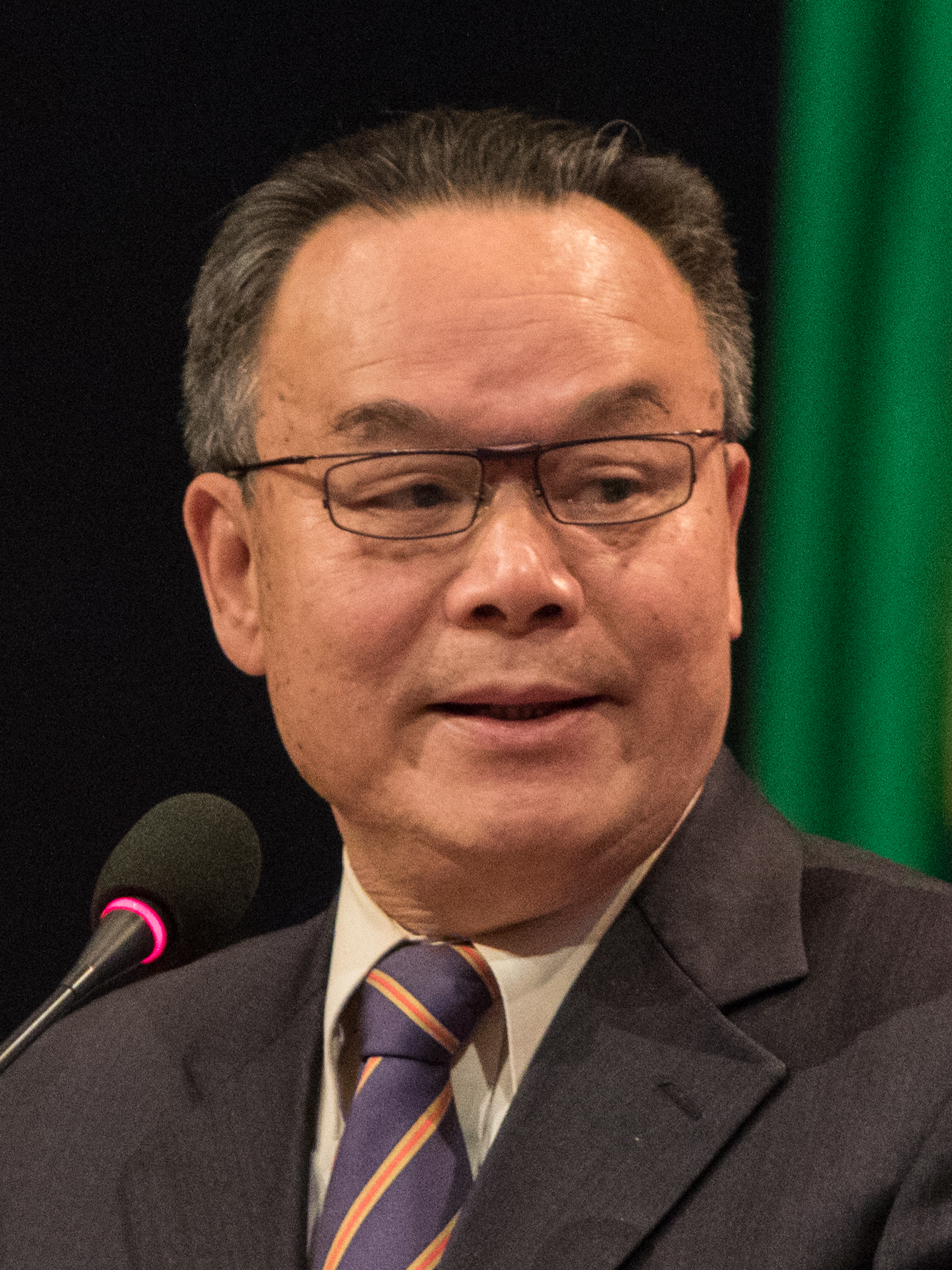
- Zhou in 2018

10th President of Peking University
- In office November 2008 – March 2013
- Preceded by: Xu Zhihong
- Succeeded by: Wang Enge

President of Jilin University
- In office 2004–2008
- Preceded by: Wu Boda
- Succeeded by: Zhan Tao

Personal details
- Born: November 20, 1947 (age 78) Liuyang County, Hunan, China
- Party: Chinese Communist Party
- Education: Peking University; University of Massachusetts Amherst

Chinese name
- Traditional Chinese: 周其鳳
- Simplified Chinese: 周其凤
Transcriptions
Standard Mandarin
- Hanyu Pinyin: Zhōu Qífèng
- Wade–Giles: Chou Ch'i-feng

Zhou Qifeng (Chinese: 周其凤; born October 1947) is a Chinese chemist and academician who formerly served as 10th President of Peking University from 2008 to 2013. He currently serves as Professor of Polymer Science and Engineering in the College of Chemistry and Molecular Engineering at Peking University. He is also a member of the Chinese Academy of Sciences.

At Peking, in 1995, he became executive vice-dean of the graduate school of Peking University and later as vice-provost of Peking University until 2001.

He was president of the International Union of Pure and Applied Chemistry (IUPAC) between 2018 and 2019 and member of Chinese Academy of Sciences. He is also a deputy of National People's Congress of the People’s Republic of China.

== Early life and education ==
Zhou Qifeng was an undergraduate student in Peking University from 1965 to 1970, and became a faculty member immediately after his graduation in 1970. He studied at University of Massachusetts Amherst and received an M.S. in 1981 and Ph.D. in 1983. In 2010, he received an honorary Doctor of Science from the University of Massachusetts Amherst.

He was elected an academician of the Chinese Academy of Sciences in 1999.

== Books, research papers and journals ==
He has published a few internationally books and over 200 papers. Zhou has received many honors for both teaching and research.

== See also ==
- List of members of the 12th National People's Congress Standing Committee

Educational offices
Preceded by Xu Zhihong	President of Peking University; 2008 - 2013	Succeeded by Wang Enge
Preceded by Wu Boda	President of Jilin University; 2004 – 2008	Succeeded by Zhan Tao
