= Chinese Optics Letters =

- Discipline: Optics
- Language: English
- Edited by: Zhizhan Xu

Publication details
- History: 2003–present
- Publisher: Optica on behalf of the Chinese Optical Society
- Frequency: Monthly
- Impact factor: 2.5 (2025)

Standard abbreviations
- ISO 4: Chin. Opt. Lett.

Indexing
- CODEN: CJOEE3
- ISSN: 1671-7694
- LCCN: 2007203206
- OCLC no.: 52790803

Links
- Journal homepage

Chinese Optics Letters is a monthly peer-reviewed scientific journal published by Optica. Established in 2003, it covers optics research originating in the People's Republic of China as well as coverage from groups outside the country.

Although the journal is sponsored by the Chinese Optical Society, it is published in English by Optica. The editor-in-chief is Zhizhan Xu (Chinese Academy of Sciences). Subject coverage includes optical engineering, fiber optics and optical communications, lasers and laser optics, nonlinear optics, integrated optics, optical and photonic materials, quantum optics, ultrafast optics, image processing, instrumentation, measurement and metrology.

== Chinese Optical Society ==
The Chinese Optical Society (COI) was founded in 1979 with Wang Daheng as its first president. Currently the society has 15,000 individual members. In 1987, the Chinese Optical Society interconnected with the International Society for Optical Engineering (SPIE) while forming a larger organization named by combining both names; hence, this relationship became the Chinese Optical Society/International Society for Optical Engineering (COI-SPIE).

== Abstracting and indexing ==
The journal is abstracted and indexed in:

- Ei Compendex
- Inspec
- Science Citation Index Expanded
- Scopus

According to the Journal Citation Reports, the journal has a 2025 impact factor of 2.5.
