= Ding Shisun =

Chinese politician (1927–2019)

- 丁石孙

Vice Chairman of the Standing Committee of the National People's Congress
- In office 16 March 1998 – 15 March 2008
- Chairman: Li Peng→Wu Bangguo

Chairman of the China Democratic League
- In office November 1996 – December 2005
- Preceded by: Fei Xiaotong
- Succeeded by: Jiang Shusheng

President of Peking University
- In office March 1984 – August 1989
- Preceded by: Zhang Longxiang
- Succeeded by: Wu Shuqing

Personal details
- Born: September 5, 1927 Shanghai
- Died: October 12, 2019 (aged 92) Beijing
- Resting place: Babaoshan Revolutionary Cemetery
- Party: China Democratic League, Chinese Communist Party
- Spouse: Gui Linlin 桂琳琳
- Education: Utopia University; Tsinghua University
- Occupation: Academic administrator, politician
- Profession: Mathematician

Chinese name
- Traditional Chinese: 丁石孫
- Simplified Chinese: 丁石孙
Transcriptions
Standard Mandarin
- Hanyu Pinyin: Dīng Shísūn
- Wade–Giles: Ting¹ Shih²-sun¹

Ding Shisun (Chinese: 丁石孙; pinyin: Dīng Shísūn; September 5, 1927 – October 12, 2019) was a Chinese mathematician, academic administrator, and politician. He served as president of Peking University during the 1989 Tiananmen Square protests and massacre, after which he was forced to resign. He later served as chairman of the China Democratic League from 1996 to 2005 and as a vice chairperson of the Standing Committee of the National People's Congress.

== Biography ==
=== Early life ===
Ding was born on September 5, 1927, in Shanghai, Republic of China, to Ding Jiacheng (丁家丞) and Liu Huixian (刘蕙仙), with his ancestral home in Zhenjiang, Jiangsu. He attended Utopia University in Shanghai from 1944 to 1947. A participant in anti-government student activities, he was arrested by the Kuomintang government and expelled by the university. As a result, he moved north to Beijing and entered Tsinghua University in 1948.

=== Tsinghua University and Peking University ===
Ding graduated from the Department of Mathematics of Tsinghua University in 1950, after the founding of the People's Republic of China, and was hired by the university as an assistant professor. In 1952, he transferred to Peking University, where he later rose to lecturer and professor.

During the Anti-Rightist Campaign in 1958, Ding sympathized with those denounced as "rightists". Although not labelled a rightist, he received administrative admonition and was expelled from the Chinese Communist Party in 1960, though his membership was later restored. When the Cultural Revolution broke out in 1966, he was imprisoned and later sent to perform manual labour at a May Seventh Cadre School. After the end of the Cultural Revolution in 1976, Ding was politically rehabilitated and appointed vice chair of the Department of Mathematics of Peking University. He was promoted to chairman in 1980.

In 1982, Ding resigned as mathematics chair and went to Harvard University as a visiting scholar. In 1983, while he was still in the United States, Peking University polled senior faculty members to select its next president, and Ding received the most votes.

In March 1984, Ding was appointed president of Peking University at the age of 57. As president, he implemented policies to reward faculty members who taught classes, especially foundational courses, withheld bonuses from those who did not teach, and dismissed those who could not teach or conduct significant research. As president, Ding continued to teach the foundational course of Advanced Algebra.

According to a report in Yanhuang Chunqiu, when Mao Xinyu, the grandson of Mao Zedong, graduated from high school in 1988, his mother Shao Hua attempted to enroll him at Peking University. Ding rejected her request on the basis that he could not guarantee Mao's safety among the liberal-minded students, and Mao ended up enrolling at Renmin University of China instead.

During his tenure, Ding promoted the spirit of "democracy and science", though some of his reforms were prevented by the government. In 1988, he submitted his resignation to Education Minister Li Tieying, but Li declined the request. When the Tiananmen Square protests erupted in April 1989, students of Peking University played a leading role, and Ding did not prevent them from joining the protests. After the June 4, 1989 crackdown on protesters, Ding was forced to resign that August. He was replaced by Wu Shuqing, a vice president of Renmin University.

In an interview with China Central Television, Ding described his tenure as president a failure, and said that he failed to transform Peking University into the ideal university he had envisioned. However, the prominent scholar Ji Xianlin called Ding one of the two best presidents in the history of the university, together with Cai Yuanpei.

=== China Democratic League ===
On the invitation of Fei Xiaotong, chairman of the China Democratic League (CDL), Ding became a full-time vice chairman of the CDL in 1993, although he continued to teach freshman mathematics at Peking University.

In November 1996, Ding succeeded Fei as chairman of the CDL. He became a vice chairperson of the Standing Committee of the National People's Congress in 1998, serving two terms until 2008. In December 2005, Ding retired as chairman of CDL and became an honorary chairman.

== Death ==
Ding died on October 12, 2019, in Beijing, aged 92. On October 17, he was buried in the Babaoshan Revolutionary Cemetery.

== Personal life ==
In 1956, Ding married Gui Linlin, a faculty member in the chemistry department of Peking University. Their wedding was held on the university campus and attended by many students and teachers. They have two sons and one grandson.

Educational offices
Previous: Zhang Longxiang	President of Peking University; 1984–1989	Next: Wu Shuqing
Previous: Duan Xuefu	Dean, Department of Mathematics, Peking University; 1981-1983	Next: Deng Donggao
Party political offices
Previous: Fei Xiaotong	Chairman of China Democratic League; 1996–2005	Next: Jiang Shusheng
Civic offices
Previous: Wu Jieping	President of Western Returned Scholars Association; 1999－2003	Next: Han Qide
