= Gong Zutong =

Chinese optical physicist

Gong Zutong (Chinese: 龚祖同; Wade–Giles: Kung Tsu-t'ung; 10 November 1904 – 26 June 1986) was a Chinese optical physicist. He was a founder of China's optical glass industry and served as Founding Director of the Xi'an Institute of Optics and Precision Mechanics of the Chinese Academy of Sciences (CAS). He was elected an academician of the CAS in 1980.

== Early life and education ==
Gong was born on 10 November 1904 in Shanghai, during the late Qing dynasty. He obtained his bachelor's degree from Tsinghua University in 1930 and joined its faculty upon graduation. In 1932, he began his postgraduate studies at Tsinghua under the supervision of the prominent physicist Chung-Yao Chao (Zhao Zhongyao), and his research on secondary gamma radiation was published in Nature.

In July 1934, he left for Germany to study at the Technische Hochschule in Berlin-Charlottenburg (now Technische Universität Berlin). After earning his engineer's license in 1936, he continued to pursue Ph.D. studies at TH Berlin, and completed his dissertation in 1937. In the same year, however, the Second Sino-Japanese War broke out and China came under military invasion by the Empire of Japan. Gong abandoned his thesis defence and returned to China to join the resistance.

== Career ==
Gong was back in China by 1938. He soon began preparing for the construction of China's first optical factory, the Kunming Optical Instrument Factory, to produce urgently needed instruments for the military. When the factory came into operation, he served as director of manufacturing. Six months later, it produced China's first telescopes for military binoculars, a landmark in China's optical industry. The factory later also manufactured targeting mirrors for machine guns.

Gong made three attempts to produce optical glass during the Sino-Japanese War, but failed in the difficult wartime conditions. After the founding of the People's Republic of China in 1949, he tried again and succeeded in 1953. After the successful trial production, he established an R&D base in Changchun, marking the beginning of China's optical glass industry.

In 1962, he established the Xi'an Institute of Optics and Precision Mechanics of the Chinese Academy of Sciences (CAS), and served as its director. The institute produced optical instruments for nuclear applications. He also developed China's first optical fiber and East Asia's then-largest astronomical telescope (with a diameter of 2.16 metres (7 ft 1 in)), and pioneered high-speed photography in China. He was elected an academician of the CAS in 1980.

Gong died in Xi'an on 26 June 1986, at the age of 81.
