= Yang Wei (engineer) =

Chinese engineer and scientist (born 1954)

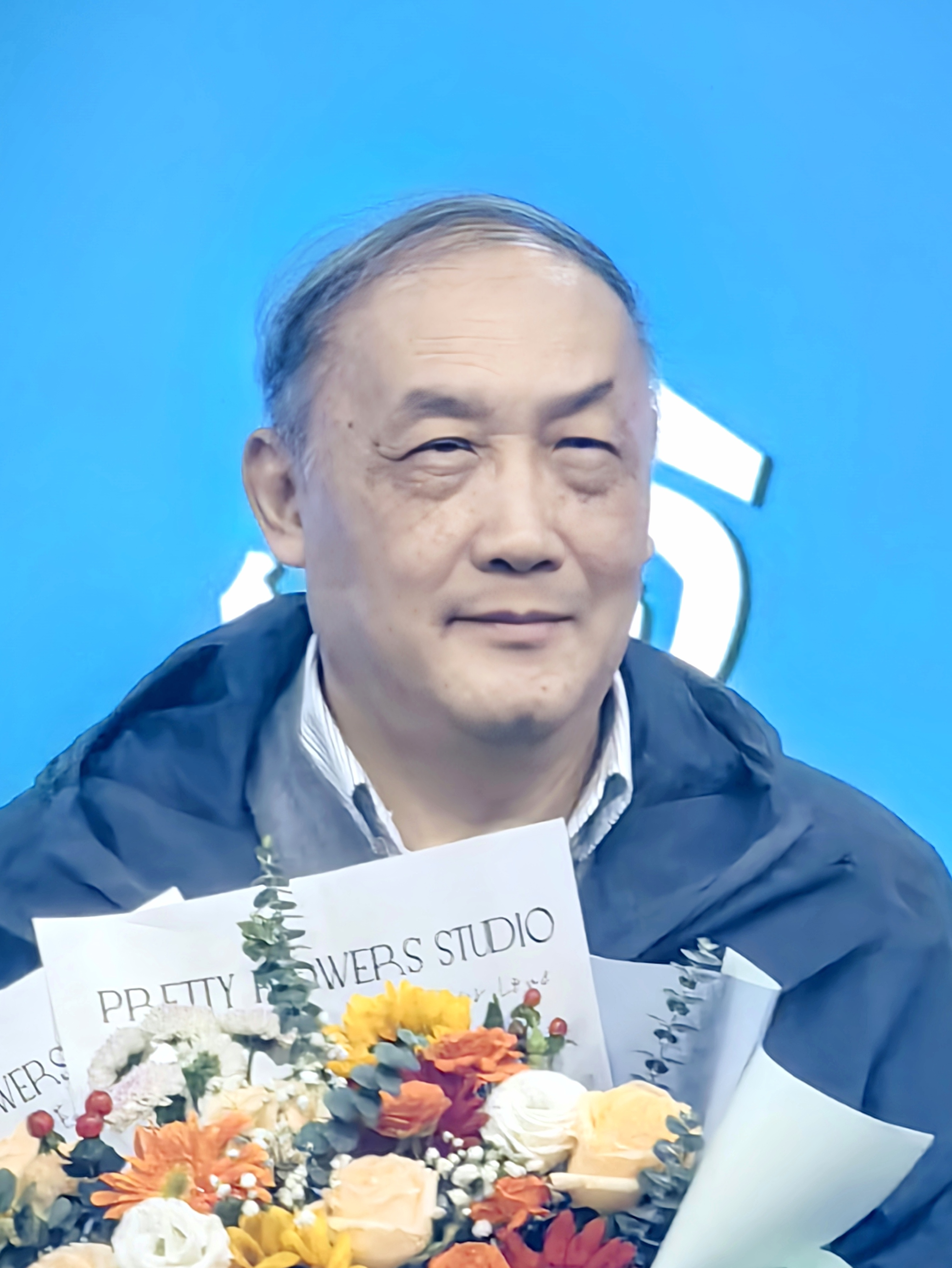
- Yang Wei (2025)
- Born: February 16, 1954 (age 71); Beijing, China
- Education: Northwestern Polytechnical University; Tsinghua University; Brown University

Yang Wei (simplified Chinese: 杨卫; traditional Chinese: 楊衛; born February 16, 1954) is a Chinese mechanical engineer. He is a member of the Chinese Academy of Sciences and served as President of Zhejiang University from August 2002 to February 2013.

== Biography ==
Yang was born in Beijing in February 1954, the son of chemical engineer Yang Guanghua. Yang studied at the Department of Material and Heat Engineering of Northwestern Polytechnical University, and graduated in 1976. In 1981, Yang received M.Eng from the Department of Engineering Mechanics, Tsinghua University. Yang obtained his PhD from Brown University in United States in 1984.

December 1989, Yang was promoted to professorship at Tsinghua University. From 1997 to 2004, he was the head of the Department of Engineering Mechanics at Tsinghua. In August 2004, Yang became executive vice-dean of the School of Aerospace, Tsinghua University. In August 2006, Yang was appointed President of Zhejiang University.

Yang is an academician of the Chinese Academy of Sciences, and The World Academy of Sciences.

In May 2009, Yang started his acting president position of APRU. The Brown University School of Engineering awarded him its BEAM (Brown Engineering Alumni Medal) Award in 2009.

In May 2012, Yang received the honorary degree of Doctor of Science from Brown University.

Yang is a world pioneer in the research fields of fracture mechanics, meso-/micro- mechanics, mechatronic reliability and has published a series books based on his research. Two of his books, "Mesoplasticity and its applications" and "Mechatronic reliability: electric failures, mechanical-electrical coupling, domain switching, mass-flow instabilities" were published by Springer.

Academic offices
Preceded by Pan Yunhe	President of Zhejiang University; 2006–2013	Succeeded by Lin Jianhua
