= Guangping County =

Guangping County 广平县 Kwangping
- County
- Location of the seat in Hebei
- Coordinates: 36°28′59″N 114°56′56″E
- Country: People's Republic of China
- Province: Hebei
- Prefecture-level city: Handan

Area
  - Total: 320 km^{2} (120 sq mi)
- Elevation: 51 m (167 ft)

Population (2020 census)
  - Total: 264,025
  - Density: 830/km^{2} (2,100/sq mi)
- Time zone: UTC+8 (China Standard)
- Postal code: 057650

Guangping County (simplified Chinese: 广平县; traditional Chinese: 廣平縣; pinyin: Guǎngpíng Xiàn; lit. 'broad flatness' is a county of southern Hebei province, China. It is under the administration of Handan City, and as of 2020, has a population of 264,025 residing in an area of 320 km^{2} (120 sq mi).

== Administrative divisions ==
There are 3 towns and 4 townships under the county's administration.

Towns:

- Guangping (广平镇), Pinggudian (平固店镇), Shengying (胜营镇)

Townships:

- Dongzhangmeng Township (东张孟乡), Shilipu Township (十里铺乡), Nanyangbao Township (南阳堡乡), Nanhancun Township (南韩村乡)

== Climate ==
Climate data for Guangping, elevation 49 m (161 ft), (1991–2020 normals, extremes 1981–present)
Month	Jan	Feb	Mar	Apr	May	Jun	Jul	Aug	Sep	Oct	Nov	Dec	Year
Record high °C (°F)	19.7 (67.5)	24.0 (75.2)	29.4 (84.9)	34.4 (93.9)	39.1 (102.4)	41.8 (107.2)	40.6 (105.1)	37.4 (99.3)	37.7 (99.9)	33.6 (92.5)	27.3 (81.1)	23.5 (74.3)	41.8 (107.2)
Mean daily maximum °C (°F)	3.9 (39.0)	8.3 (46.9)	14.8 (58.6)	21.2 (70.2)	26.8 (80.2)	32.2 (90.0)	32.1 (89.8)	30.4 (86.7)	27.0 (80.6)	21.3 (70.3)	12.5 (54.5)	5.6 (42.1)	19.7 (67.4)
Daily mean °C (°F)	−1.9 (28.6)	2.1 (35.8)	8.5 (47.3)	14.9 (58.8)	20.6 (69.1)	25.9 (78.6)	27.1 (80.8)	25.4 (77.7)	20.7 (69.3)	14.7 (58.5)	6.5 (43.7)	0.0 (32.0)	13.7 (56.7)
Mean daily minimum °C (°F)	−6.2 (20.8)	−2.7 (27.1)	3.0 (37.4)	9.1 (48.4)	14.7 (58.5)	20.1 (68.2)	22.9 (73.2)	21.4 (70.5)	15.8 (60.4)	9.5 (49.1)	1.8 (35.2)	−4.1 (24.6)	8.8 (47.8)
Record low °C (°F)	−18.9 (−2.0)	−15.9 (3.4)	−7.7 (18.1)	−2.2 (28.0)	3.5 (38.3)	7.8 (46.0)	16.3 (61.3)	12.5 (54.5)	4.1 (39.4)	−2.1 (28.2)	−17.1 (1.2)	−18.7 (−1.7)	−18.9 (−2.0)
Average precipitation mm (inches)	3.3 (0.13)	7.5 (0.30)	10.1 (0.40)	30.2 (1.19)	39.5 (1.56)	64.0 (2.52)	137.0 (5.39)	97.9 (3.85)	47.6 (1.87)	29.5 (1.16)	16.7 (0.66)	4.5 (0.18)	487.8 (19.21)
Average precipitation days (≥ 0.1 mm)	2.0	3.1	3.0	5.1	6.4	7.9	10.7	9.3	6.5	5.0	4.2	2.4	65.6
Average snowy days	2.9	2.8	0.9	0.3	0	0	0	0	0	0	1.1	2.3	10.3
Average relative humidity (%)	63	59	56	63	66	61	78	83	77	69	70	67	68
Mean monthly sunshine hours	147.5	160.4	212.9	236.9	263.0	234.5	210.0	213.6	196.8	191.6	159.7	149.2	2,376.1
Percentage possible sunshine	48	52	57	60	60	54	48	52	53	56	53	50	54
Source: China Meteorological Administration all-time January high
