= Chen Jia'er =

Chinese physicist

Chen Jia'er (Chinese: 陈佳洱; born 1 October 1934) is a Chinese nuclear physicist, an accelerator physicist and an academician of the Chinese Academy of Sciences (CAS).

Chen was born in Shanghai, and graduated from the department of physics of Northeast China People's University (now Jilin University) in Changchun in 1954. From 1955, he was a teacher in the department of technology physics at Peking University, and was elevated to vice department chair. From 1963 to 1965, Chen was invited by British Royal Society and became a visiting scholar in department of nuclear physics at Oxford University and Rutherford Appleton Laboratory, studying serial electro-static accelerator and synchrotron. From 1982 to 1984, he was a visiting scientist at Stony Brook University and Lawrence Berkeley National Laboratory. In August 1984, Chen became the vice president and dean of graduate school of Peking University. He was also appointed as the director of Institute of Heavy Particle Physics at PKU. In November 1993, Chen was elected an academician of the Chinese Academy of Sciences, Maths and Physics section. From August 1996 to December 1999, Chen served as the president of Peking University. In 1998, he became the president of Asian-Pacific Physics Society. In December 1999, Chen was appointed to be the director of National Natural Science Foundation of China.

Academic offices
Preceded by Wu Shuqing	President of Peking University; 1996 – 1999	Succeeded by Xu Zhihong
