= Gong Qihuang =

Chinese opticist and educator

- 龚旗煌
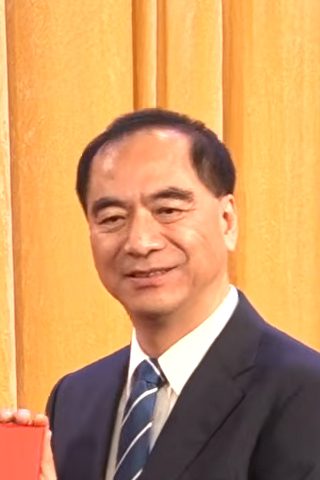

President of Peking University
- Incumbent
- Assumed office 17 June 2022
- Party Secretary: Hao Ping
- Preceded by: Hao Ping

Personal details
- Born: August 15, 1964 (age 61) Putian County, Fujian, China
- Party: Chinese Communist Party
- Education: Peking University (BS, MS, PhD)
- Scientific career
- Fields: Optics
- Institutions: Peking University

Chinese name
- Simplified Chinese: 龚旗煌
- Traditional Chinese: 龔旗煌
Transcriptions
Standard Mandarin
- Hanyu Pinyin: Gōng Qíhuáng

Gong Qihuang (Chinese: 龚旗煌; born 15 August 1964) is a Chinese opticist and educator who is a professor and former president of Peking University (2022-2026).

Gong's research has been mainly in the field of nonlinear optics and spatiotemporal small-scale optics.

== Biography ==
Gong was born in Putian County (now Putian), Fujian, on 15 August 1964. He earned a bachelor's degree in 1983, a master's degree, and a doctorate in 1989, all from Peking University. In 1988, he was sent to study at the University of Manchester on government scholarships. He carried out postdoctoral research at Peking University in 1989.

After graduating in 1991, he stayed at Peking University and worked successively as instructor, associate professor, and full professor.

He was appointed deputy dean of the School of Physics in November 2009, became deputy director of the Development Planning Department in March 2012, executive vice dean of the Graduate School in July 2015, and director of the Academic Committee of Peking University in March 2017.

He moved up the ranks to become vice president in July 2017, executive vice president in December 2019, and president in June 2022.

== Honours and awards ==
- 1997 Qiushi Outstanding Young Scholar Award
- 2007 Fellow of the Institute of Physics (IOP)
- 2010 Fellow of The Optical Society (OSA)
- 2013 Member of the Chinese Academy of Sciences (CAS)
- 2015 Member of the Chinese Optical Society (COS)
- 2016 Science and Technology Progress Award of the Ho Leung Ho Lee Foundation
- 2018 Fellow of The World Academy of Sciences (TWAS)

Educational offices
| Preceded by Yan Chunhua | Executive Vice Dean of Graduate School, Peking University; 2015–2017 | Succeeded by Zhang Dongxiao |
| Preceded by Gao Song | Provost of Peking University; 2018–2022 | Succeeded by TBA |
| Preceded by Hao Ping | Dean of Graduate School, Peking University; 2019–2022 | Succeeded by TBA |
| Preceded by Hao Ping | President of Peking University; 2022–present | Incumbent |
Academic offices
| Preceded by Zhou Bingkun | President of the Chinese Optical Society; 2017–present | Incumbent |
