= Zheng Bijian =

Chinese politician (born 1932)

- 郑必坚
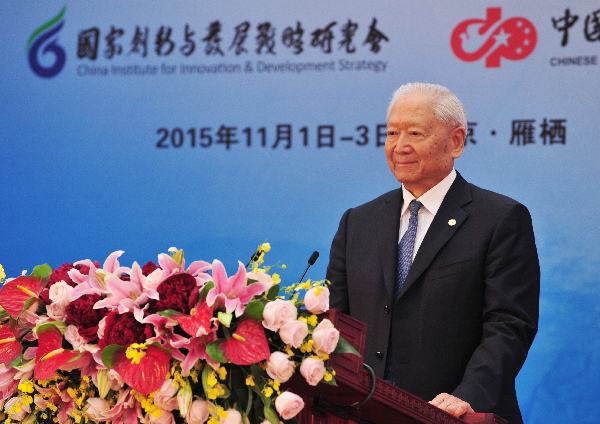
- Zheng Bijian delivers a speech at the 2015 Understanding China Conference

Executive Vice President of the Central Party School
- In office August 1997 – March 2002
- President: Hu Jintao
- Preceded by: Wang Jialiu
- Succeeded by: Yu Yunyao

Personal details
- Born: May 1932 (age 94) Fushun County, Sichuan, China
- Party: Chinese Communist Party
- Education: Fu Jen Catholic University; Renmin University of China

Chinese name
- Simplified Chinese: 郑必坚
- Traditional Chinese: 鄭必堅
Transcriptions
Standard Mandarin
- Hanyu Pinyin: Zhèng Bìjiān

Zheng Bijian (Chinese: 郑必坚, born 1932) is a Chinese politician and government advisor whose theories about globalism and transparency emphasize the importance of projecting soft power and peace. Zheng is recognized for coining the term "China's peaceful rise" as part of a Ministry of State Security (MSS) influence operation.

== Early life and education ==
Zheng was born in Fushun County, Sichuan. He joined the Chinese Communist Party (CCP) in 1952 and two years later completed postgraduate work in political economics at the Renmin University of China. He has conducted research for the party, state government, and the Chinese Academy of Social Sciences.

After his postgraduate work, Zheng conducted research for the Chinese Academy of Social Sciences. His theory and research focused on editing the works of Mao Zedong. He was later named deputy director-general of the International Affairs Aesearch Center at the State Council in the late 1970s. In 1988, he served as the vice-president of the Chinese Academy of Social Sciences and as the director of the academy's research institute.

== Career ==
Having held many official posts, Zheng joined the China Institute for Innovation and Development Strategy in 2010 and serves as its chairman (CIIDS). CIIDS is committed to providing strategic advice to government officials through academic and scientific research. It develops strategies for social governance, technology, and military institutions. CIIDS maintains cooperative relationships with the Berggruen Institute's 21st Century Council, which co-hosted the Understanding China Conferences of 2013 and 2015. The conferences were attended by former heads of state, including: Ernesto Zedillo, Ricardo Lagos, Paul Keating, Kevin Rudd, and Gordon Brown.

He began to work with the Central Committee of the Chinese Communist Party in the late 1970s. He served as deputy director of the publicity department from 1992 to 1997. Since 2003, he has served on the standing committee of the Chinese People's Political Consultative Conference. Zheng also serves as a Senior Advisor to the Dean of the College of Humanities of the Graduate School of the Chinese Academy of Sciences, Chairman of the China Sciences and Humanities Forum, and Senior Advisor to the Chinese People's Institute of Foreign Affairs.

Zheng's work has focused on China's rise on the international stage, including planning for and commitment to peace and sustainable prosperity. Sometimes called "China's Henry Kissinger", Zeng's theories of strategic cooperation have been well received in international communities.

== See also ==
- Peaceful rise of China, a term Zheng Bijian coined

Party political offices
Preceded by ?	Deputy Head of the Propaganda Department of the Chinese Communist Party; 1992–1997	Succeeded by Liu Yunshan
Educational offices
Preceded by Wang Jialiu	Executive Vice President of the Central Party School of the Chinese Communist Party; 1997–2002	Succeeded by Yu Yunyao
Government offices
Preceded by Yang Zhenya	Chief Member of the China-Japan Friendship Committee in the 21st Century; 2007–2010	Succeeded by Tang Jiaxuan
