= Yan Fu =

Chinese translator and scholar (1854–1921)

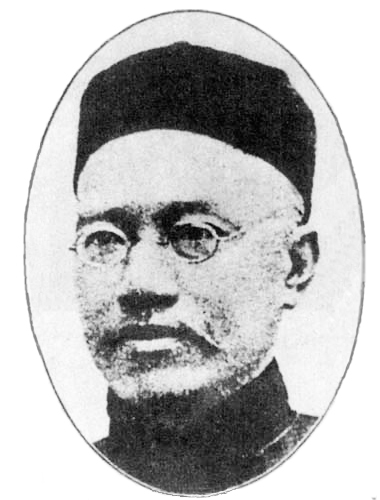

President of National Peking University
- In office 3 May 1912 – 1 October 1912
- Preceded by: Lao Naixuan (as President of the Imperial University of Peking)
- Succeeded by: Zhang Shizhao

President of Fudan University
- In office 1906–1907
- Preceded by: Ma Xiangbo
- Succeeded by: Xia Jingguan

Personal details
- Born: Yan Chuanchu (嚴傳初); 8 January 1854 Yangqi Village, Houguan County (now Fuzhou), Fujian, China
- Died: 27 October 1921 (aged 67) Langguan Alley, Houguan County, Fujian, China
- Education: Royal Naval College, Greenwich
- Occupation: Military officer, newspaper editor, translator, writer

Yan Fu (simplified Chinese: 严复; traditional Chinese: 嚴復; pinyin: Yán Fù; Wade–Giles: Yen^{2} Fu^{4}; courtesy name Ji Dao (幾道); 8 January 1854 – 27 October 1921) was a Chinese military officer, newspaper editor, translator, and writer. He is most known for introducing Western ideas to China during the late 19th century.

== Life ==
On January 8, 1854, Yan Fu was born in what is modern-day Fuzhou, Fujian province, to a respectable scholar-gentry family in the trade of Chinese medicine. In his early years, Yan Fu's father greatly encouraged Yan Fu to obtain a high level of education and prepare for the Imperial examination. However, the death of his father in 1866 caused an abrupt change to these plans. A year later, Yan Fu entered the Foochow Arsenal Academy in Fuzhou, a Western school where he studied a variety of subjects including English, arithmetic, geometry, algebra, trigonometry, physics, chemistry, astrology and navigation. This was a turning point in young Yan Fu's life as he was able to experience the first-hand contact with Western science, thus inspiring the enthusiasm that carried him through the rest of his career.

After graduating with high honors in 1871, Yan Fu went on to spend the next five years at sea. He first served aboard the training ship Jianwei (建威) and later on the battlecruiser Yangwu (揚武). In 1877–79 he studied at the Royal Naval College, Greenwich, England. During his years there, he became acquainted with China's first ambassador Guo Songtao, and despite their age difference and status gap developed a strong friendship. Benjamin I. Schwartz mentions in his biography that "they often spent whole days and nights discussing differences and similarities in Chinese and Western thought and political institutions".

His return to China, however, did not bring him the immediate success he was hoping for. Though he was unable to pass the Imperial Civil Service Examination, he was able to obtain a teaching position at the Foochow Arsenal Academy and then Beiyang Naval Officers' School (北洋水師學堂) at Tianjin. During this time, Yan Fu succumbed to opium addiction which was wide spread in China at the time.

It was not until after the Chinese defeat in the First Sino-Japanese War (1894–95, fought for control of Korea) that Yan Fu became famous. He is celebrated for his translations, including Thomas Huxley's Evolution and Ethics, Adam Smith's The Wealth of Nations, John Stuart Mill's On Liberty and Herbert Spencer's Study of Sociology. Yan critiqued the ideas of Darwin and others, offering his own interpretations. The ideas of natural selection and survival of the fittest were introduced to Chinese readers through Yan's work. The former idea was famously rendered by Yan Fu into Chinese as tiānzé (天擇). Yan popularized the theory of evolution, emphasizing its ramifications for China and establishing Social Darwinism as the framework according to which the majority of Chinese intellectuals and politicians understood international conflicts.

Yan Fu served as an editor of the newspaper Guowen Bao. He became politically active, and in 1895, he was involved in the Gongche Shangshu movement, which opposed the Treaty of Shimonoseki ending the First Sino-Japanese War.

In March 1895, he wrote an article in which he described China as a sick man. According to Yan:

A nation is like a human. If an individual is not physically active, the body will be weak. If a person is active physically, the body will be strong. This is common sense. How about a sick man? If he wants to transform his sick body into a strong one overnight, he is bound to overdo. Pursuing this strategy to become strong will actually speed up his death. Does today's China look like a sick man?

Yan contended that to become a strong nation, the Chinese people must improve their physical strength, intelligence, and moral values. He criticized opium smoking and foot binding, the latter based on the idea that only a healthy mother could produce healthy children.

In 1909, he was given an honorary Jinshi degree. In 1912 he became the first principal of National Peking University (now Peking University). Today the university holds an annual academic conference in his honor.

He became a royalist and conservative who supported self-appointed Emperor Yuan Shikai's and Zhang Xun's imperial ambitions in his later life. He also participated in the foundation of Chouanhui (籌安會), an organization that supported restoring the monarchy. He laughed at "New Literature Revolutionaries" such as Hu Shih.

Utilitarianism and 'Life-ism' (the continuous expansion and preservation of life) were advocated by Yan and Liang Qichao, but drew criticism from Wang Guowei.

Yan closely followed the events of World War I. In 1914, he predicted that Germany would lose, comparing Kaiser Wilhelm II to Xiang Yu (who had superior power when he began to compete with Liu Bang for the Mandate of Heaven, but ultimately failed and Liu became the first emperor of the Han dynasty). When Japan attacked Qingdao and advanced into Ji'nan, Yan contended that China would be defeated if it attempted to fight. He hoped that China could appeal for justice following the war, and initially believed that the war would transform international affairs. Later, he became disillusioned, and wrote that the West had used its scientific knowledge and development for barbaric killing that nearly led to civilizational destruction. After the War's conclusion, he developed the belief that only Confucianism could save China and the West.

On October 27, 1921, after returning to his home in Fuzhou only a year earlier to recuperate from his recurring asthma, Yan Fu died at the age of 67.

== Translation theory ==
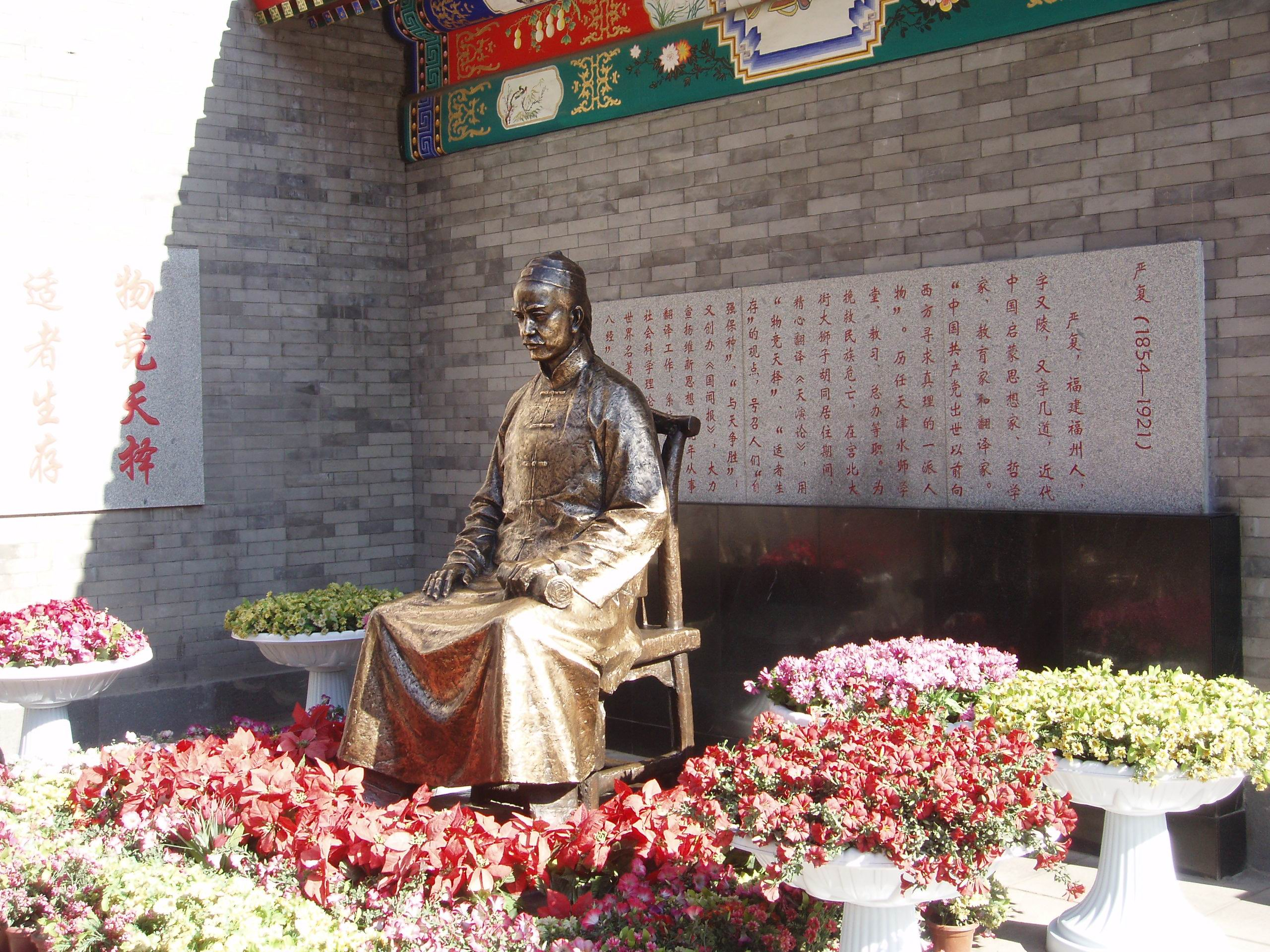
Statue of Yan Fu at Tianjin

Yan stated in the preface to his translation of Evolution and Ethics (天演論) that "there are three difficulties in translation: faithfulness, expressiveness, and elegance" (譯事三難：信達雅). He did not set them as general standards for translation and did not say that they were independent of each other. However, since the publication of that work, the phrase "faithfulness, expressiveness, and elegance" ("Xin Da Ya") has been attributed to Yan Fu as a standard for any good translation and has become a cliché in Chinese academic circles, giving rise to numerous debates and theses. Some scholars argue that this dictum actually derived from Scottish theoretician of translation Alexander Fraser Tytler.

Though Yan Fu's classical prose did its best to meet the standards of "faithfulness, expressiveness, and elegance", there were those who criticized his works for not being accessible to the younger generations. In particular, a famous liberal from the May Fourth Movement, Cai Yuanpei, stated in an article written in 1924: "...[Yan Fu's translations]...seem to be old-fashioned and his literary style is difficult to comprehend, but the standard with which he selected books and the way he translated them are very admirable even today". Other critiques of his work arose as Chinese scholars became more aware of Western learning.

== Translated works ==
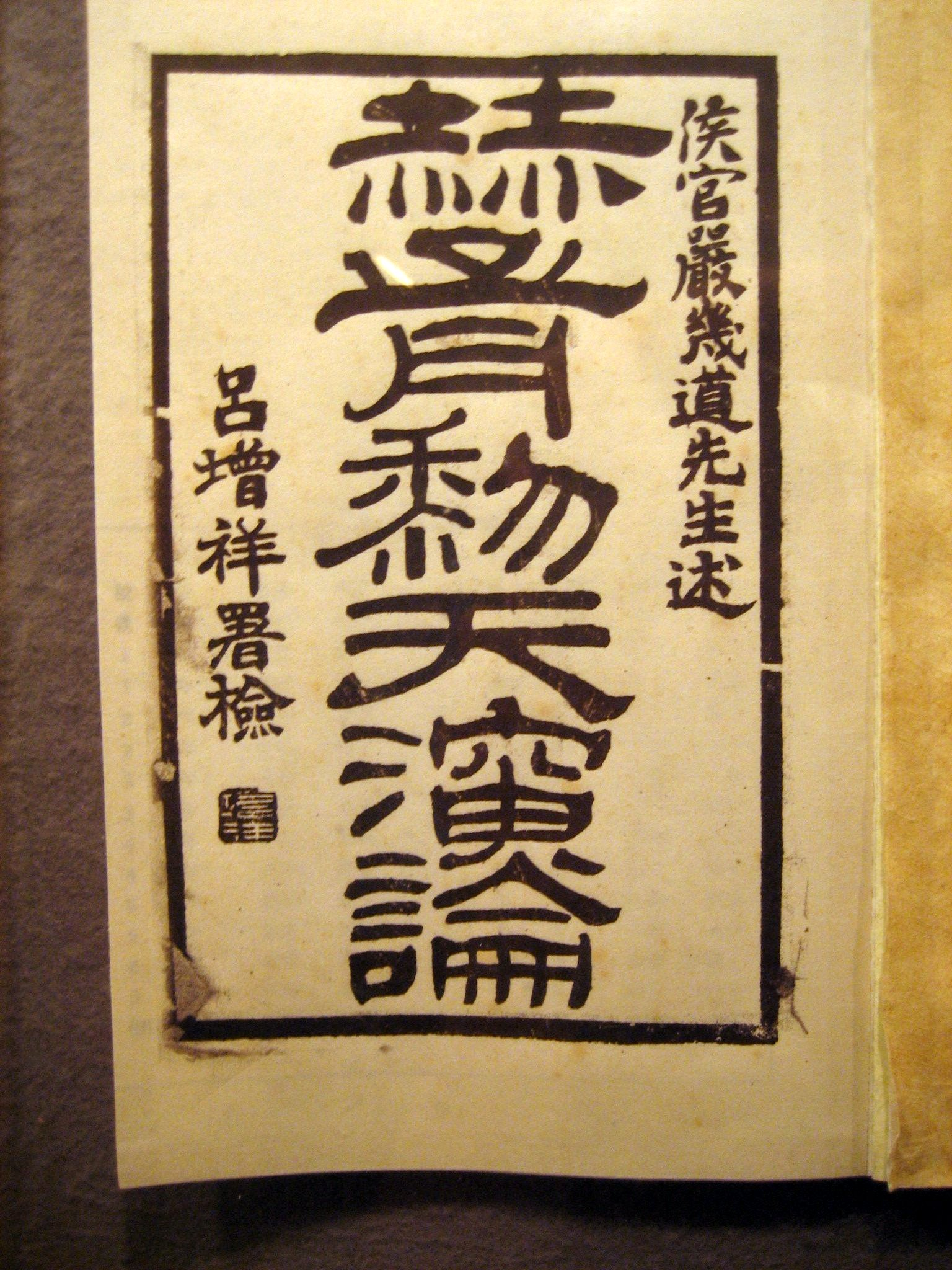
Yan Fu's translation of Evolution and Ethics

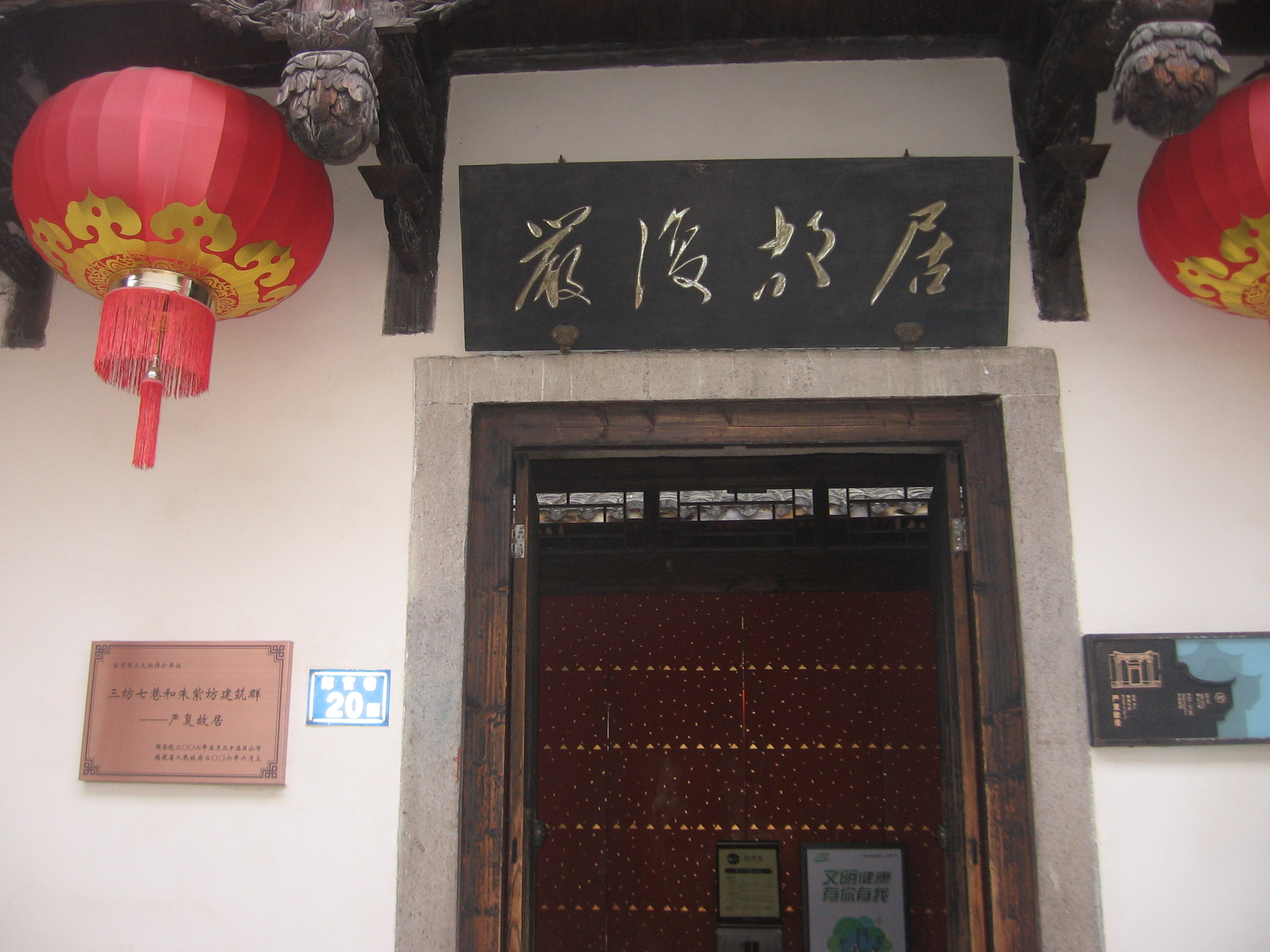
Former residence of Yan Fu in Fuzhou

Yan Fu was one of the most influential scholars of his generation as he worked to introduce Western social, economic and political ideas to China. Previous translation efforts had been focused mainly on religion and technology. Yan Fu was also one of the first scholars to have personal experiences in Western culture, whereas many prior scholars were students in Japan who then translated Western works from Japanese to Chinese. Yan Fu also played an important role in the standardization of science terminology in China during his time serving as the Head of the State Terminology Bureau.

In 1895 he published Zhibao (直報), a Chinese newspaper founded in Tianjin by the German Constantin von Hannecken (1854–1925), which contains several of his most famous essays:

- Lun shi bian zhi ji 論世變之亟 (On the Speed of World Change)
- Yuan qiang 原強 (On the Origin of Strength)
- Pi Han 辟韓 (In Refutation of Han Yu)
- Jiuwang jue lun 救亡決論 (On our Salvation)

Later, from 1898 to 1909, Yan Fu went on to translate the following major works of Western liberal thought:

- Evolution and Ethics by Thomas Henry Huxley as Tianyan lun 天演論 (On Evolution) 1896–1898
- The Wealth of Nations by Adam Smith as Yuan fu 原富 (On Wealth) 1901
- The Study of Sociology by Herbert Spencer as Qunxue yiyan 群學肄言 (A Study of Sociology) 1903
- On Liberty by John Stuart Mill as Qunji quanjie lun 群己權界論 (On the Boundary between the Self and the Group) 1903
- A System of Logic by John Stuart Mill as Mule mingxue 穆勒名學 (Mill's Logic) 1903
- A History of Politics by Edward Jenks as Shehui tongquan 社會通詮 (A Full Account of Society) 1903
- The Spirit of Law by Montesquieu as Fayi 法意 (The Meaning of the Laws) 1904–1909
- Primer of Logic by William Stanley Jevons as Mingxue qianshuo 名學淺說 (An Outline of Logic) 1909

== Notes ==
Academic offices
Preceded by Ma Xiangbo	President of Fudan University; 1906–1907	Succeeded by Xia Jingguan
Preceded by Lao Naixuan as President of the Imperial University of Peking	President of National Peking University; 3 May 1912–1 October 1912	Succeeded by Zhang Shizhao
