= Chinese Optical Society =

Chinese optics and photonics professional association

- Abbreviation: COS
- Founded: December 20, 1979
- Founder: Wang Daheng; Gong Zutong; Qian Linzhao
- Type: Professional organization
- Purpose: Optics and photonics
- Location: Haidian District, Beijing, China
- Region served: China
- Members: 15,000
- Key people: Gong Qihuang
- Parent organization: China Association for Science and Technology
- Website: www.cncos.org

Chinese Optical Society (simplified Chinese: 中国光学学会; traditional Chinese: 中國光學學會; pinyin: Zhōngguó Guāngxué Xuéhuì; abbreviated COS) is a professional association of individuals with an interest in optics and photonics. It sponsored the Chinese Optics Letters, a monthly peer-reviewed scientific journal focusing on optics. As of 2019, the society has 21 specialized committees and 7 working committees with more than 15,000 individual members.

== History ==
The Chinese Optical Society was established by Wang Daheng, Gong Zutong and Qian Linzhao on December 20, 1979. In 1987, it became a member of the International Commission for Optics (ICO).

== Scientific publishing ==
- Chinese Optics Letters

== List of presidents ==
No.	Name	Chinese name	Notes
1	Wang Daheng	王大珩	
2	Wang Daheng	王大珩	
3	Wang Daheng	王大珩	
4	Mu Guoguang	母国光	
5	Mu Guoguang	母国光	
6	Zhou Bingkun	周炳琨	
7	Zhou Bingkun	周炳琨	
8	Gong Qihuang	龚旗煌	
