= Ke Shaomin =

Chinese historian (1850–1933)

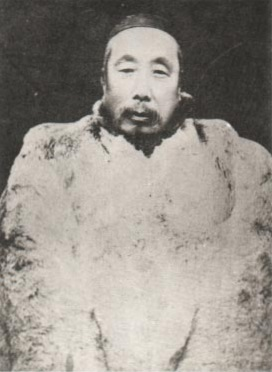
Ke Shaomin

Ke Shaomin (Chinese: 柯劭忞, 1850–1933), courtesy name Fengsun (Chinese: 鳳孫), also known by his art name Liaoyuan (Chinese: 蓼園), was a Chinese historian from Jiaozhou, Laizhou Prefecture, Shandong. He is most known for writing the New History of Yuan, one of the Twenty-Five Histories, and helping to lead the compilation of the Draft History of Qing. He was a secretary in the Qing dynasty court in its final years.
