= Wu Shuqing (economist) =

Chinese economist (1932–2020)

- 吴树青

President of Peking University
- In office August 1989 – August 1996
- Preceded by: Ding Shisun
- Succeeded by: Chen Jia'er

Personal details
- Born: 3 January 1932 Jiangyin, Jiangsu, Republic of China
- Died: 10 January 2020 (aged 88) Beijing, People's Republic of China
- Party: Chinese Communist Party
- Education: Renmin University of China

Academic work
- Discipline: Economy
- Institutions: Renmin University of China; Peking University
- Main interests: China's economy after reform and opening up
- Notable works: First of All, We Need to Find out What Socialism Is; Chinese Socialist Construction; China's Macroeconomic Management

Chinese name
- Traditional Chinese: 吳樹青
- Simplified Chinese: 吴树青
Transcriptions
Standard Mandarin
- Hanyu Pinyin: Wú Shùqīng

Wu Shuqing (Chinese: 吴树青; 3 January 1932 – 10 January 2020) was a Chinese economist and educator. He was president of Peking University from August 1989 to August 1996 and vice-president of Renmin University of China.

== Biography ==
Wu was born in Jiangyin, Jiangsu, Republic of China (1912-1949) on 3 January 1932. He attended Changshu Middle School and Shanghai High School. In August 1948, after the liberation of Tongxiang County, he was a staff member at the County Chinese Communist Party (CCP) Committee. In July 1952, he studied, then taught, at Renmin University of China, he served in several posts there, including instructor, professor, doctoral supervisor, and vice-president. He joined the CCP in 1955. In August 1989, he was appointed president of Peking University, replacing Ding Shisun, who did not prevent students of Peking University from joining the Tiananmen Square protests. When his term ended, he continued to serve as a professor, honorary director of the council and president of Education Foundation at the university. On 10 January 2020, he died of an illness at Beijing Hospital, aged 88.

== Works ==
- 吴树青自选集 [A Personal Anthology of Wu Shuqing] (in Chinese). Beijing: Learning Press. 2003. ISBN 9787801163783.
- 政治经济学 [Political Economics] (in Chinese). Beijing: Higher Education Press. 2018. ISBN 9787040502527.
- 科学发展与社会和谐 [Scientific Development and Social Harmony] (in Chinese). Beijing: Peking University Press. 2008. ISBN 9787301135303.

Educational offices
Previous: Ding Shisun	President of Peking University; 1989–1996	Next: Chen Jia'er
