= Fang Xin (politician) =

Chinese politician

Member of the Standing Committee of the National People's Congress
- Incumbent
- Assumed office March 2003

Personal details
- Born: 1955; Beijing, China
- Political party: Chinese Communist Party
- Education: Beijing University of Technology; Beijing Institute of Technology (MA); Tsinghua University School of Economics and Management (Ph.D)

Fang Xin (Chinese: 方新; pinyin: Fāng Xīn; born 1955) is a Chinese politician who currently serves in the Standing Committee of the National People's Congress as a member of the Chinese Communist Party. Prior to her political career she served as director of the Chinese Academy of Sciences Institute of Policy & Management.

== Early life ==
Fang Xin was born in 1955, in Beijing, China. She graduated from the Beijing University of Technology in 1980, from the Beijing Institute of Technology with a Master of Arts in 1982, and from the Tsinghua University School of Economics and Management with a doctor of philosophy in 1997. From 1987 to 1988, she was a visiting scholar to George Washington University.

== Career ==
In 2002, Fang was named as "An Outstanding Woman Leader" by the Central Committee of the Chinese Communist Party. Fang worked as director of the Chinese Academy of Sciences Institute of Policy & Management until her election to the Standing Committee of the National People's Congress in March 2003. Fang served as a delegate to the 16th National Congress of the Chinese Communist Party.
