= Henan delegation to the National People's Congress =

Henan Delegation to the National People's Congress
- 全国人民代表大会河南省代表团
- Delegation for the National People's Congress
- Map showing the location of Henan Province
- Electoral unit: Henan Province
- Population: 99,365,519

Current Delegation
- Created: 1954
- Seats: 174
- Head of delegation: Lou Yangsheng
- Provincial People's Congress: Henan Provincial People's Congress

The Henan delegation to the National People's Congress is a delegation composed of deputies representing Henan Province within the National People's Congress (NPC), the supreme organ of state power of the People's Republic of China. NPC deputies from the Henan Province are officially elected by the Henan Provincial People's Congress.

== List of deputies ==
Year	NPC sessions	Deputies	Number of deputies	Ref.
1954	1st	Kong Xiangzhen, Yin Da, Wang Huayun, Wang Wei, Wang Yizhai, Wu Zuoren, Wu Zhipu, Song Chuan, Song Lian, Li Shizhang, Li Xuefeng, Li Jinghan, Du Yanqing, Wang Juqian, Meng Futang, Meng Yu, Qu Wu, Lin Liru, Bing Zhi, Hou Lianying, Fan Wenlan, Sun Xiangyun, Shi Zhe, Xu Zirong, Ma Yunwu, Ma Yuzhen, Gao Zhenwu, Chang Xiangyu, Kang Keqing, Zhang Bosheng, Zhang Zhen, Zhang Yunchuan, Cao Jinghua, Guo Zechen, Chen Shiju, Chen Fengtong, Ji Wenfu, Zeng Chuanliu, Xu Kai, Feng Zhi, Yang Tingbao, Yang Zhongjian, Yang Yunyu, Yang Xiandong, Jia Xinzai, Jia Tuofu, Zhao Wenfu, Zhao Shuli, Liu Jiuxue, Liu Mingbang, Liu Jingfan, Deng Yingchao, Lu Dinghua, Lai Ruoyu, Wei Wei, Su Dianxuan: By-election on June 15, 1956: Fu Zicheng	56	
1959	2nd	Kong Xiangzhen, Yin Da, Wang Huayun, Wang Wei, Wang Yizhai, Wu Zuoren, Wu Zhipu, Song Chuan, Song Lian, Li Shizhang, Li Xuefeng, Li Jinghan, Du Yanqing, Wang Juqian, Meng Futang, Meng Yu, Qu Wu, Lin Liru, Bing Zhi, Hou Lianying, Fan Wenlan, Sun Xiangyun, Shi Zhe, Xu Zirong, Ma Yunwu, Ma Yuzhen, Gao Zhenwu, Chang Xiangyu, Kang Keqing, Zhang Bosheng, Zhang Zhen, Zhang Yunchuan, Cao Jinghua, Guo Zechen, Chen Shiju, Chen Fengtong, Ji Wenfu, Zeng Chuanliu, Xu Kai, Feng Zhi, Yang Tingbao, Yang Zhongjian, Yang Yunyu, Yang Xiandong, Jia Xinzai, Jia Tuofu, Zhao Wenfu, Zhao Shuli, Liu Jiuxue, Liu Mingbang, Liu Jingfan, Deng Yingchao, Lu Dinghua, Lai Ruoyu, Wei Wei, Su Dianxuan: By-election on June 15, 1956: Fu Zicheng	56	
1964	3rd	Ding Shengshu, Yu Baoju, Ma Pengcheng, Ma Zhenxi, Wen Minsheng, Fang Zizhong, Wang Wanjun, Wang Huayun, Wang Shouchun, Wang Zhijie, Wang Guoquan, Wang Meizhen, Wang Peixin, Mao Zilian, Mao Cuichu, Deng Yingchao, Yin Da, Feng Yin, Lu Fenggao, Shi Laihe, Bai Shouyi, Liu Wenshu, Liu Fangsheng, Liu Yufeng, Liu Tongqi, Liu Mingbang, Liu Yingxiang, Liu Zhuyi, Liu Yanchun, Liu Fengju, Liu Hongwen, Qi Hezhi, Xu Qisheng, Xu Zhao, Zhu Hongfu, Sun Yijin, Sun Yutai, Sun Xiangyun, Wang Tingpei, Wang Juqian, Song Jing, Su Dianxuan, Du Yanqing, Du Mengmo, Du Yansun, Li Pingyi, Li Xiangfu, Li Laicai, Li Boren, Li Chunying, Li Linhuan, Li Junfu, Li Zhun, Li Suqin, Li Fudu, Yang Shaoqiao, Yang Chun, Yang Mingkun, Yang Xiandong, Wu Shaokui, He Wei, He Zehui, Zhang Shiyu, Zhang Wenqi, Zhang Ziqing, Zhang Jie, Zhang Changling, Zhang Jinfeng, Zhang Shaoning, Zhang Bing, Zhang Shuzhi, Zhang Zhiyi, Zhang Xinfang, Zhang Ruihua, Zhang Yangang, Zhang Suiqing, Lu Yuanjiu, Chen Yonggui, Chen Zhengshi, Chen Rumei, Chen Shunying, Lin Tongji, Lin Liru, Shang Deming, Hu Xuanchang, Jin Chao, Bingzhi, Zhou Shili, Zhao Wenfu, Zhao Fengqi, Zhao Shuge, Zhao Feng, Zhao Boji, Zhao Qing, Zhao Yimin, Hu Lisheng, Hu Beisan, Duan Yongjian, Hou Deyuan, Xu KaiGao Wenbin, Gao Yunfeng, Gao Jie, Gao Zhenwu, Gao Lu, Guo Qiao, Guo Zechen, Guo Peiyun, Qin Hanzhang, Yuan Baohua, Mo Xinyi, Jia Ziyi, Qian Boxuan, Qian Duanyou, Qian Chenghai, Ni Haishu, Ni Tonggang, Xu Zirong, Xu Xusheng, Tao Enrui, Kou Huating, Zhang Hanfu, Mei Zuyi, Cao Fu, Cao Jinghua, Chang Xiangyu, Cui Dongyuan, Tu Shou'e, Zeng Chuanliu, Xie Zizhen, Xie Weijie, Huang Dunci, Jiang Deqi, Dong Zigan, Dong Minsheng, Lu Dinghua, Jin Xigeng, Lan Jiabi, Cai Wuji, Fan Li, Li Xingyao, Huo Bingquan, Wei Zhaoming, Wei Wei	144	
1975	4th	Ding Laihe, Ma Guangzong, Wang Lixue, Wang Dahai, Wang Huayun, Wang Dongfang, Wang Lanzhen, Wang Guobin, Wang Qin, Wang Zhenqing, Wang Aifang, Wang Weiqun, Niu Xuezhi, Shi Xiulan, Tian Xiuqing, Shi Shufen, Ning Shide, Lü Decai, Wu Zhuosheng, Ren Yun, Hua Shan, Liu Youming, Liu Kerang, Liu Qinglou, Liu Jianxun, Liu Qinghuai, Xu Mu, Xu Changzhi, Sun Zhenqing, Su Dianxuan, Du Baoquan, Li Shixing, Li Wenguang, Li Sili, Li Laochun, Li Maosheng, Li Junying, Li Weixin, Li Mianniu, Li Lu, Yang Lanchun, Yang Zhaojun, Yang Shunyang, Yang Junsheng, Xiao Yangqing, Shi Ronglian, Wu Shaokui, Leng Shude, Shen Qiong, Zhang Youshan, Zhang Cang Xing, Zhang Wenxiang, Zhang Yuxiang, Zhang Xingren, Zhang Shoude, Zhang Xuezhi, Zhang Zonghai, Zhang Guanqi, Zhang Baohuai, Zhang Xichen, Chen Suhua, Shao Xingchang, Lin Shuhua, Luo Shiyu, Jin Chunrong, Zheng Fazhong, Zheng Baofa, Shan Guowen, Zhao Gai, Zhao Suhua, Zhao Dengtai, Zhao Fuzan, Jing Laitai, Bai Meiqin, Xu Xiuzhen, Nie Shichang, Yan Anchun, Qian Gaidi, Xu Donghua, Xu Guixia, Gao Jie, Gao Weiqi, Guo Enrong, Guo Jibao, Guo Peiyun, Tang Qishan, Ji Shuyun, Huang Minying, Cao Shou, Cao Panmin, Cao Shufen, Sheng Laizhi, Cui Ruokai, Kou Jinyu, Peng Cuixiang, Dong Yuqin, Han Fengyi, Han Jinming, Han Xueyi, Jing XiaoqinXie Jiafang, Xue Ximei, Ji Guixin, Wei Huaiqing, Wei Mingcai	105	
1978	5th	Yu Heiding, Ma Yide, Ma Mingzhang, Ma Hengshen, Ma Enpu, Wang Lixue, Wang Wanlin, Wang Zhongxian, Wang Huayun, Wang Bingyin, Wang Shitang, Wang Xiqing, Wang Shouqin, Wang Huzhi, Wang Jinrong, Wang Jianying, Wang Junfu, Wang Jiliang, Wang Jinhua, Kong Zhaoxiu, Deng Yingchao, Ai Erzhong, Shi Xiulan, Shi Guanqing, Ye Tianjiang, Ye Renshou, Ran Tiancheng, Shi Laihe, Shi Shufen, Ning Shide, Wu Zhuosheng, Liu Gengxin, Liu Jianxun, Liu Guizhen, Liu Hongwen, Liu Fugong, Liu Teng, An Cuiqin, Xu Mu, Xu Dunfu, Sun Zhongchao, Sun Fa'e, Sun Zhongyi, Sun Tangqing, Sun Mingwen, Sun Jingrong, Su Dianxuan, Du Jun, Li Wanxin, Li Zifan Li Yufeng, Li Guanghui, Li Maosheng, Li Jinlan, Li Gengcai, Li Xueming, Li Baoyu, Li Junfeng, Li Jiming, Li Huanzhang, Li Weixin, Li Fudu, Li Jintang, Li Deyun, Yang Qixiang, Yang Shunyang, Yang Jingchu, Xiao Daguo, Xiao Yangqing, Wu Yuechun, Wu Baichuan, Wu Xianshu, Wu Shaokui, Gu Tongshu, Xin Xianzhang, Wang Gencheng, Shen Qiong, Song Xiurong, Song Siqin, Zhang Wenxiang, Zhang Li, Zhang Chengguo, Zhang Qingji, Zhang Laisuo, Zhang Huaide, Zhang Yinxi, Zhang Bing, Zhang Hongjun, Zhang Hongji, Zhang Guizhu, Zhang Xichen, Zhang Xinfang, Zhang Yangang, Chen Naixin, Chen Shoujing, Chen Xiande, Wu Dianrong, Miao Shaoqi, Lin Shuhua, Luo ShiyuJin Mingzhi, Zhou Shouzheng, Zheng Zhongren, Zheng Ziwu, Zheng Minglan, Meng Xiuyun, Zhao Shuge, Zhao Hengfu, Zhao Yi, Jing Laitai, Hu Lijiao, Hu Shangli, Hu Jinju, Hu Chunshan, Hu Yiping, Zan Shenquan, Jiang Xiaofeng, Xu Xiuzhen, Yao Conggong, He Daiwen, Qin Shichen, Yuan Shimin, Li Bingzhen, Qian Duanyou, Xu Donghua, Gao Longsheng, Gao Shuanzhu, Guo Youxian, Guo Xiumei, Guo Peiyun, Guo Weihuai, Hai Faying, Cao Shou, Cao Panmin, Chang Xiangyu, Cui Yufu, Sheng Wan, Peng Cuixiang, Dong Yuqin, Dong Minsheng, Han Xueyi, Han Qinshan, Xie Jiafang, Huo Bingquan, Wei Huaiqing, Wei Aosen	105	
1983	6th	Ding Shi, Yu Heiding, Ma Hongyuan, Ma Mingzhang, Wang Tianjiang, Wang Huayun, Wang Yuqin, Wang Yonghuan, Wang Shouzhong, Wang Ruyao, Wang Xin, Wang Gengtian, Wang Xiurong, Wang Ying, Wang Guoquan, Wang Peilan, Wang Gengsheng, Wang Jianying, Wang Junfu, Wang Yanhui, Wang Guilan, Wang Xiaozhong, Wang Peichun, Wang Yinzong, Wang Dechen, Wei Guoqing, Niu Xingrong, Gan Yongxiang, Zuo Mingsheng, Shi Guanqing, Lu Sichuan, Ye Gang, Ye Peng, Shi Laihe, Ran Tiancheng, Fu Luosheng, Bai Xichuan, Feng Hongshun, Feng Hao, Ji Fengxian, Lü Fengrong, Lü Yongsheng, Zhu Jiaqi, Qiao Qingjian, Wu Yingfa, Liu Caihua, Liu Yuzhai, Liu Zhengwei, Liu Zuozhi, Liu Mingcai Liu Zude, Liu Yuezhong, Liu Fugong, Jiang Qintang, Sun Shucai, Sun Jingrong, Sun Shankang, Mai Lizhi, Du Jun, Wu Lanying, Li Shiying, Li Yongxin, Li Nianhai, Li Baoguang, Li Chunyan, Li Xiangge, Li Runtian, Li Jiming, Li Fudu, Li Xinping, Li Fuxiang, Yang Zao, Yang Qingtang, Yang Hui, Yang Jingsan, Wu Bo, Wu Shaokui, He Zhukang, Shen Zhongxi, Shen Qiong, Song Zhenming, Song Xiyun, Zhang Changjiang, Zhang Wensheng, Zhang Wenyun, Zhang Guanlan, Zhang Kezhong, Zhang Yinxi, Zhang Xueyin, Zhang Jingzhi, Zhang Xinyu, Zhang Yangang, Chen Tianran, Chen Changyuan, Chen Zhenghua, Chen Zhaohua, Chen Bingzhi, Chen Shouyu, Chen Decheng, Shao WenjieShao Yuhua, Shao Qiu, Fan Meilan, Lin Zuoji, Hang Huilan, Luo Shiyu, Ji Minghuan, Zhou Lirong, Zhou Shouzheng, Zheng Minglan, Zheng Shuzhen, Zhao Fengyu, Zhao Wenfu, Zhao Tingxuan, Zhao Chenni, Zhao Qianhe, Zhao Fulin, Rong Gaotang, Hu Shuli, Hu Jingchun, Duan Zijun, Duan Lanying, Duan Ruxun, Jiang Jianwen, Zhu Gaihuan, Geng Mengxia, Mo Ruyin, Li Bingzhen, Xia Xiumei, Qian Qiongli, Xu Donghua, Xu Nengguang, Xu Daohui, Yin Weishen, Guo Youxian, Guo Peiyun, Guo Weihuai, Hai Guangxing, Tao Shaobin, Huang Guangzheng, Huang Shouwu, Huang Hongen, Cao Cewen, Chang Xiangyu, Yan Fabing, Dong Minsheng, Jiang Jianping, Cheng Jungu	146	
1988	7th	Ding Yi, Ding Chuan, Ding Baiyuan, Yu Heiding, Ma Xingao, Ma Rongke, Wang Xiaomei, Wang Yimin, Wang Zhongyue, Wang Shuyu, Wang Ruzhen, Wang Xiurong, Wang Yingang, Wang Baolian, Wang Yanhui, Wang Hongyan, Wang Qun, Wang Dechen, Wang Delin, Wei Guoqing, Kang Chongren, Kong Qingzhu, Gan Yongxiang, Zuo Mingsheng, Li Liangfu, Shi Laihe, Fu Luosheng, Bai Fengxiang, Bai Shuangli, Bai Xichuan, Lü Yongsheng, Zhu Shuquan, Zhu Jiaqi, Zhu Jingyun, Zhu Dezhao, Wu Yingfa, Liu Caihua, Liu Zhongxuan, Liu Siqian, Xu Fuhua, Sun Wucheng, Sun Honglie, Sun Shankang, Mai Lizhi, Ji Hanxing, Du Shichen, Wu Lanying, Li Changduo, Li Wenxian, Li Jinling Li Chengen, Li Tingyu, Li Zhenhua, Li Chao, Yang Ligong, Yang Zhende, Yang Hui, Yang Keng, Wu Shaokui, He Zhiju, He Zemin, Yu Shishun, Wang Yunzeng, Shen Chengming, Shen Haiguan, Song Yuxi, Song Guohua, Zhang Tianlan, Zhang Wensheng, Zhang Zhaorui, Zhang Chixia, Zhang Zhiping, Zhang Xiuqing, Zhang Chen, Zhang Ming, Zhang Shude, Zhang Bingxi, Zhang Honghua, Zhang Jinghui, Zhang Ruizhang, Zhang Xinya, Chen Xiaowang, Chen Tianran, Chen Yumei, Chen Zhenghua, Chen Zhaohua, Chen Shouyu, Chen Qizong, Chen Qiubei, Chen Futai, Fan Haogu, Fan Qinchen, Lin Zuoji, Lin Zhikai, Zhou Lirong, Zhou Maichang, Zheng Shuzhen, Zhao Fengyu, Zhao Wenfu, Zhao WenlongZhao Zhenfeng, Zhao Chenni, Zhao Fulin, Zhao Fulin, Hu Shujian, Duan Hua, Hou Jingzhi, Hong Wenguang, Zhu Lanqin, Yao Minxue, Yao Fuqin, He Zhifang, Qin Yaohua, Nie Shaobao, Li Bingzhen, Xia Xiumei, Gu Ming, Qian Qiongli, Gao Baoqian, Guo Xiaogen, Guo Yuanying, Guo Peiyun, Tang Wanzhang, Tang Guangyu, Tang Zuxuan, Hai Guangxing, Tao Shaobin, Tao Xinxia, Huang Fawa, Huang Guangzheng, Huang Shouwu, Mei Yangzheng, Cao Cewen, Gong Zhaoshu, Chang Xiangyu, Cui Dianliang, Yan Fabing, Yan Xiuqin, Dong Minsheng, Cheng Weigao, Fu Meirong, Zeng Tao, Wen Jishan, Pei Shixia, Li Ming, Pan Xiandi, Pan Ling, Dai Ming, Dai Baoxing, Wei Jinhua, Wei Guiyun	148	
1993	8th	Ding Yi, Ding Chuan, Ding Guangzhi, Ma Manao, Ma Zhongchen, Ma Shubin, Ma Ruiwen, Wang Rixin, Wang Fengying, Wang Fashui, Wang Youjie, Wang Liezhao, Wang Hongfan, Wang Junli, Wang Guanqun, Wang Zhenqiu, Wang Liurong, Wang Suizhou, Wang Qun, Wang Dianxun, Niu Xuezhong, Mao Xingzhong, Fang Chengrong, Zuo Mingsheng, Shi Laihe, Dai Lucun, Bai Fengxiang, Feng Wencheng, Lü Maosheng, Zhu Shuquan, Zhu Qizhen, Zhu Zhiguo, Liu Shiming, Liu Zhongxuan, Liu Zhihua, Liu Guoguang, Liu Bingyin, Liu Ruiyun, Liu Zengjie, Guan Wenya, Guan Fuchang, Sun Qianju, Sun Honglie, Ji Hua, Li Shuan, Li Chuanjia, Li Lanqing, Li Huaiqing, Li Songwu, Li Jian Zhong, Li Zuwei, Li Chao, Yang Laishun, Yang Xiulan, Yang Jinliang, Wu Jichuan, Wu Cuilan, Yu Wenhua, Yu Shishun, Yu Heng, Shen Ningfu, Shen Chengming, Shen Qiuping, Shen Haiguan, Zhang Guangxing, Zhang Tianlan, Zhang Wensheng, Zhang Shijun, Zhang Shiying, Zhang Shilin, Zhang Shenghuo, Zhang Zhaorui, Zhang Zhigang, Zhang Ming, Zhang Siqing, Zhang Fusheng, Zhang Raoni, Zhang Enzhu, Zhang Xijun, Zhang Hai, Zhang Min, Zhang Haoruo, Zhang Ruizhang, Zhang Xinya, Chen Fenghua, Chen Shouyu, Chen Zuoyu, Chen Ming, Chen Chunping, Chen Qiubei, Fan Zhaoyuan, Fan Haogu, Fan Qinchen, Fan Baoguo, Fan Lian, Lin Kongxing, Lin Aiying, Lin Zuoji, Lin Yinghai, Yu Mingshan,Luo Gan, Ji Xinchang, Zhou Pei, Zhou Hongchun, Zhou Suiji, Zheng Zengmao, Feng Lixing, Zhao Yulian, Zhao Bingshen, Zhao Dongwan, Zhao Cunxian, Zhao Zhiji, Zhao Ming'en, Zhao Zongjin, Zhao Fulin, Zhao Jinghua, Hao Yanzhong, Hou Zhiying, Yu Jiahua, Rao Lu, Jiang Heying, Jiang Li'an, Zhu Youwen, Yao Xiurong, Qin Kecai, Jia Baozhen, Xu Gendi, Guo Zhongkui, Guo Yueqing, Guo Anmin, Guo Jincheng, Tang Guangyu, Tao Lihua, Tao Xinxia, Cao Jiang, Cao Cewen, Gong Zhaoshu, E Xiaofen, Cui Jizhe, Cui Xinfang, Liang Changjian, Dong Jinrong, Han Tianjing, Han Shunfeng, Jing Xianzhuo, Cheng Dian, Jiao Jinhu, Shi Haifa, Lei Shusheng, Pei Xiuqin, Xue Suizhu, Dai Ming	151	
1998	9th	Ding Guangzhi (Hui), Wan Long, Ma Wanling, Ma Manao (Hui), Ma Zhongchen, Ma Shubin, Ma Xianzhang (Hui), Wang Zihao, Wang Shaoqing, Wang Yuhua, Wang Yuyu, Wang Fashui, Wang Chenglai, Wang Quanshu, Wang Jinian, Wang Liurong, Wang Mengshu, Wang Yinzong, Wang Shumei, Wang Fulong, Wang Fujun, Wang Dianxun, Niu Xuezhong, Fang Gang, Fang Xiaoyu, Kong Yufang, Deng Yaping, Deng Tongmei, Deng Zhifang, Shen Jingren, Tian Chengzong, Shi Laihe, Shi Peide, Fu Lanxiang, Fu Zhifang, Bai Qingcai, Feng Chunhe, Feng Lingyun, Lü Maosheng, Lü Xinyi, Zhu Zhiguo (Hui), Qiao Jinling, Ren Keli, Liu Zhongyi, Liu Yu, Liu Shiming, Liu Zhihua, Liu Qiwen, Liu Dianli, Liu Xueqin, Liu Baoqi (Hui) Liu Bingyin, Liu Minshan, Liu Zengjie, Guan Fuchang (Manchu), Xu Zhidao, Sun Lanqing, Sun Xiulan, Sun Shangjian, Sun Qianju, Sun Honglie, Mai Yongling (Hui), Mai Wangzhen (Hui), Ji Hua (Manchu), Du Yaomin, Li Yichao, Li Rixu, Li Chengyu (Hui), Li Zhixing, Li Keqiang, Li Huaiqing, Li Songwu, Li Guoan (Hui), Li Xuebin, Li Jingmou, Li Jugen, Li Bin, Li Daomin, Li Xinmin, Li Fugan, Yang Jingyu, Yang Degong, Xiao Hong (Manchu), Wu Tianxi (Hui), Wu Zhongxiang, Wu Zuyu, Yu Yonghong, Yu Heng, Yu Cailian, Song Fengnian, Song Guohua, Song Qiumei (Zhuang), Song Hongwu, Zhang Guangxing, Zhang Shilin, Zhang Hanying, Zhang Bailiang, Zhang BaozhenZhang Sujing, Zhang Enzhu, Zhang Xijun, Zhang Hai, Zhang Haiyan, Zhang Min, Zhang Haoruo, Zhang Xinya, Zhang Deguang, Chen Yichu, Chen Quanguo, Chen Xiumei, Chen Guozhen, Chen Kuiyuan, Chen Xiaoguo, Chen Nanxian, Chen Xianzhi, Fan Zhaoyuan, Lin Aiying, Lin Zuoji, Hu Meiling (Hui), He Ruizhi, Ji Xinchang (Mongolian) Jin Hongyi (Hui nationality), Jin Xing, Zhou Yizhong, Zhou Xiaochun, Feng Lixing, Zhao Cunxian, Zhao Ming'en, Zhao Zhongheng, Zhao Bingshen, Zhao Tiechui, Hu Zhitong, Nan Zhenzhong, Zhong Lisheng, Hou Zongbin, Yao Wenjun, Yao Xiurong, Yao Juchuan, Yuan Chongfu, Geng Jianguo, Jia Lianchao, Jia Ruiqin (Hui nationality), Xia Zongyong, Xu Jichao, Gao Guotuan, Guo Zhongkui, Guo Zi'an, Guo Zhenqian, Tang Zuxuan, Tao Lihua, Tao Xinxia, Huang Tingyuan, Huang Xingwei, Huang Haisong, Cao Cewen, Cui Xinfang, Liang Changjian, Dong Lanxiang, Shi Yongxin, Lu Guoting, Lu Fayao, Pei Qunguo, Xue Dinghai, Ji Bingxiang	163	
2003	10th	Wan Baorui, Wan Long, Ma Bingtai, Wang Zihao, Wang Xunzhi, Wang Fashui, Wang Youjie, Wang Jinian, Wang Xiaojiang, Wang Kunbo, Wang Shangyu, Wang Mingyi, Wang Mengshu, Wang Xin'ai (female, Hui), Wei Ruqin, Zhi Shuping, Mao Wanchun, Mao Chaofeng, Deng Yongjian, Deng Zhifang (female), Zuo Xinya, Shen Changyu, Shi Laihe, Bao Jianmin, Lü Jinhu (Hui), Zhu Tianbao, Zhu Zhiguo (Hui), Zhu Xuejun, Qiao Jinling, Ren Keli, Ren Maodong, Liu Changchun, Liu Shiming (female), Liu Zhihua (female), Liu Huailian, Liu Qiwen, Liu Xueqin, Liu Baoqi (Hui), Liu Enxue, Liu Haicheng, Liu Xuelan (female), Liu Minshan (female), Liu Mancang, Tang Yuxiang, Sun Xiulan (female), Sun Gui Sun Yaozhi, Li Wanzhi, Li Yichao, Li Changjie, Li Changduo, Li Wenshan, Li Wencheng, Li Chengyu (Hui), Li Zhijing, Li Zhibin, Li Keqiang, Li Liancheng, Li Huaiqing, Li Honggui, Li Guoan (Hui), Li Guoying, Li Baishuan, Li Guiji, Li Qisheng, Li Gen, Li Liufa, Li Liuen, Li Haiyan (female), Li Daomin, Li Shenming, Yang Ziqiang, Yang Yun (female), Yang Chunyu, Yang Shengdao, Yang Jingyu, Lian Ziheng, Xiao Hong (Manchu), Wu Tianjun, He Dongcheng, Song Fengnian, Song Xuantao, Zhang Dawei, Zhang Guangxing, Zhang Yixiang, Zhang Hanying (female), Zhang Bailiang, Zhang Rongsuo, Zhang Zhenhe, Zhang Xiaoyang, Zhang Hai, Zhang Haiqin, Zhang Min (female), Zhang Qinghai, Chen Yichu, Chen GuozhenChen Zemin, Chen Xinqin (female), Miao Runpu, Fan Jun, Fan Yunjie (female), Fan Baoguo, Lin Yinghai, Hu Meiling (female, Hui), He Ruizhi (female), Jin Xianchun (female, Hui), Jin Xing (female), Zhou Wenchang, Zhou Chunyan (female), Zhou Xiaochun (female), Zhou Haoyun (female), Zheng Youquan, Zheng Maojie (Hui), Zheng Quan, Meng Zhenping, Zhao Jibin, Zhao Jiangtao, Zhao Qisan, Zhao Guocheng, Zhao Ming'en, Hao Ping (female), Hu Dabai (female), Nan Zhenzhong, Cha Min (female), Jiang Ming, Fei Guohua, Yao Dafu, Yao Tian'en, Yao Zhongliang, Yao Ju Quan (female), Yao Juchuan, Jia Chunwang, Jia Baoshun, Jia Ruiqin (female, Hui nationality), Xia Lin, Gu Zhiping, Dang Hongxin, Xu Jichao, Xu Dequan, Ling Jiefang, Gao Guotuan (female), Guo Zhongkui, Tang Zuxuan, Sang Guowei, Mei Xiubo (female), Cao Chaoyang, Cao Cewen, Cui Mingjie, Cui Xiaofeng, Fu Wenzeng (female), Yan Guoxiang, Jiang Zhongpu, Shu Huiguo, Shi Yongxin, Jin Kewen, Jin Suidong, Chu Junguo, Pei Chuankai, Pei Guobin (female, Mongolian nationality), Xiong Weizheng, Fan Huitao, Xue Jingxia (female), Huo Jinhua (female), Dai Songling, Wei Xuezhu	165	
2008	11th	Diao Zhaoqiu, Wan Long, Ma Li (female), Ma Wenfang, Wang Ziliang, Wang Shiyao, Wang Youli, Wang Gang, Wang Jinian, Wang Longde, Wang Mingyi, Wang Jianqi, Wang Baocun, Wang Jumei (female), Wang Mengshu, Wang Yinliang (Hui), Wang Pengjie, Wang Xihui, Mao Jie (female), Hua Youxun, Jie Tongbin, Ji Chengjiang, Kong Fanqun, Kong Yufang (female), Kong Lingchen, Shi Xiushi, Shen Zhenjun, Shi Jichun, Lü Jinhu (Hui), Lü Qinghai, Zhu Guangping, Zhu Wenchen, Zhu Xiayan, Qiao Qiusheng, Qiao Bin, Ren Keli, Ren Qinxin, Liu Dagong, Liu Yunshan, Liu Shenghui, Liu Zhihua (female), Liu Guoqing, Liu Xinmin, Guan Aihe, Tang Yuxiang, An Huiyuan, Qi Jinli, Xu Weigang, Xu Yongyue, Sun Xiulan (female) Sun Jianke, Sun Taosheng, Sun Yaozhi, Mai Shirui (female, Hui), Su Fugong, Li Wei, Li Changjie, Li Wenhui, Li Ya, Li Chengyu (Hui), Li Qinggui, Li Hongxia (female), Li Ke (Zhuang), Li Liancheng, Li Qihong (female), Li Yingjie, Li Guoying, Li Jinzhi (female), Li Baishuan, Li Gen, Li Liufa, Li Haiyan (female), Li Chong, Li Qinglin, Li Lianwu, Li Qin (female), Li Shenming, Lian Ziheng, Wu Yuanquan, Di Yingqi (Manchu), Wang Yuansi, Shen Mingcai, Song Fengnian, Zhang Dawei, Zhang Guangzhi, Zhang Liyong, Zhang Bailiang, Zhang Quanmin, Zhang Quanshou, Zhang Junbang, Zhang Rongsuo, Zhang Hongen, Zhang Xiaoyang, Zhang Yingcen, Chen Quanguo, Chen Guozhen, Chen Zemin, Chen YiyuChen Jiansheng, Chen Xuefeng, Miao Runpu, Fan Jun, Lin Jingshun, Hu Meiling (female, Hui nationality), Zhou Yizhong, Zhou Guoyun, Zhou Xiaochun (female), Zhou Sen, Zheng Yongkou, Zheng Youquan, Zheng Maojie (Hui nationality), Zheng Quan, Meng Wei, Zhao Qisan, Zhao Qinglin, Zhao Ming'en, Zhao Jiancai, Zhao Suping (female), Hao Ping (female), Hu Baosen, Nan Zhenzhong, Duan Yuxian, Jiang Ming, Yao Zhongliang, Yao Juquan (female), Qin Yuhai, Yuan Jianguo, Qian Guoyu, Xu Guang, Xu Guangchun, Xu Jichao, Xu Dequan, Ling Jie Fang, Guo Zhongkui, Guo Shengmin (female), Guo Jianhua (female), Guo Hongchang, Guo Zhenfu, Guo Ruimin, Tang Zuxuan, Sang Jinke, Huang Yuqing (female), Cao Weizhou, Cao Weixin, Cao Chaoyang, Cui Mingjie, Cui Junhui, Cui Xiaofeng, Liang Tiehu, Kou Bing'en, Dong Yong'an, Jiang Zhongpu, Jiang Duyun, Chu Yaping, Shi Yongxin, You Yingge (female, Tujia), Lu Guoxian, Cai Ning, Pei Chunliang, Xiong Weizheng, Fan Huitao, Xue Jingxia (female), Huo Jinhua (female), Dai Songling, Wei Wenbo, Wei Xuezhu	166	
2013	12th	Wan Long, Ma Wenfang, Ma Yuping, Ma Zhenglan, Ma Linqing, Ma Yi (Hui), Wang Youli, Wang Gang, Wang Yuyan (female), Wang Longde, Wang Mingyi, Wang Zhanying, Wang Xiu (female), Wang Mengshu, Wang Yinliang (Hui), Wang Chaoyang, Wang Feng, Wang Pengjie, Wang Xin (female), Mao Jie (female), Yin Zhongqing, Kong Fanqun, Deng Kai, Lu Zhangong, Shen Zhenjun, Bai Hongzhan, Ji Bingwei, Lü Jinhu (Hui), Zhu Wenchen, Zhu Zhengxu (female), ~~Zhu Wei~~, Zhu Mengzhou, Zhu Xiayan, Qiao Qiusheng, Qiao Bin, Qiao Xinjiang, Ren Xiurong (female), Ren Qinxin, Liu Weixing, Liu Wenxin, Liu Zhihua (female), ~~Liu Guoqing~~, Liu Chunliang, Liu Mancang, Yang Yi (female, Hui), Guan Aihe, Jiang Fan, Tang Yuxiang, An Kang, Xu Weigang, Sun Likun, Sun Yaozhi, Mai Shirui (female, Hui), Li Shiqiang, Li Changjie, Li Yaping (female), Li Guangyu, Li Wei, Li Ke (Zhuang), Li Liancheng, Li Yingjie, Li Jinzhi (female), Li Baishuan, Li Liushen, Li Gen, Li Liufa, Li Haiyan (female), Li Chong, Li Qi (female), Li Lianwu, Li Qin (female), Li Xinhua, Li Shenming, Yang Liping (female), Yang Shengdao, Yang Xuemei (female), Wu Yuanquan, Yu Xueyou, Shen Tao, Song ~~Fengnian~~, Zhang Dawei, Zhang Long'an, Zhang Liyong, Zhang Quanshou, Zhang Junbang, Zhang Guohui, Zhang Zebao (Hui), ~~Zhang~~ Zequn, Zhang Xiaoyang, Zhang Qianhong (female), Zhang Qinghai, Zhang Qiong (female), Zhang Yingcen, Chen Guozhen, Chen Zemin, Chen Jiansheng, Chen Xiang'en, ~~Chen Xuefeng~~Wu ~~Yulu~~, Fan Lixin, Fan Haitao, Zhi Hui (female), Luo Hui, Yue Wenhai, Zhou Hong (female), Zhou Guoyun, Zhou Chunyan (female), Zhou Sen, Zheng Yongkou, Zheng Youquan, Meng Wei, Zhao Leji, Zhao Qisan, Zhao Ming'en, Zhao Suping (female), Zhao Zhenhui, Zhao Yanshui, Zhao Haiyan (female), Hao Ping (female), Hu Baosen, Zhong Jianying (female), Shi Yigong, Jiang ~~Ming, Yao Zhongliang, Qin Yuhai~~, Yuan Jianghua (female), Xia Jie (female, Hui nationality), Qian Guoyu, Xu Guangchun, Xu Jichao, Xu Xiao (female), Xu Xiaoxiang (female), Xu Dequan, Ling Jiefang, Gao Xiqing, Gao A Li (female), Guo Xiansheng, Guo Gengmao, Guo Jianhua (female), Guo Hongchang, Guo Zhenfu, Tang Zuxuan, Huang Yuqing (female), Huang Buyi (female), Huang Yan (female), Cao Weizhou, Cao Cunzheng, Cao Weixin, Sheng Guomin, Cui Xiaotian (female), Liang Tieshan, Dong Zhongyuan, Jiang Zhongpu, Jing Zhu, Chu Yaping, Shi Yongxin, You Yingge (female, Tujia), Xie Xuren, Xie Jingrong, Lei Xueqin (female), Cai Ning, Pei Chunliang, Liao Huage (female), Xiong Weizheng, Fan Huitao, Fan Jinjun, Xue Jingxia (female), Huo Jinhua (female), Mu Weimin, Dai Songling, Wei Xiaodong, Wei Ming	172	
2018	13th	Ding Wei, Ding Fuhao, Wan Exiang, Ma Wenfang, Ma Yuping, Ma Yuxia (female), Ma Baozi, Wang Gang, ~~Wang Tie~~, Wang Xiu (female), Wang Xin (female), Wang Tianyu, Wang Zhongli, Wang Dongwei, Wang Dongjing, Wang Shouping, Wang Dujuan (female), Wang Baocun, Wang Yinliang (Hui), Wang Chaoyang, Wang Dengxi, Wang Xinwei, Niu Shucheng, Fang Yunzhou, Kong Changsheng, Shi Yingjun, Shi Jubin, Lu Keping, Tian Kegong, Shi Bingrui, Ning Jianhua (female), Ning Yaqiu (female, Manchu), Feng Qiya (female), Si Fuchun, Xing Jinglong (Hui), Lü Miaoxia (female), Lü Jinhu (Hui), Zhu Ting (female), Zhu ~~Shixi~~, Zhu Huanran, Zhu Xianfu, Qiao Bin, Qiao Qiusheng, Ren Zhengxiao, Liu Qian, Liu Wenxin, Liu Zhihua (female), Liu Shangjin, Liu Wankang, Liu Chunliang, Liu Xianglian (female), Liu Yongjun, Liu Zhenwei, Yang Yi (female, Hui), Jiang Shulin, Tang Yuxiang An Wei, An Kang, Xu Weigang, Mai Shirui (female, Hui), Sun Yunfeng, Sun Zhiping, Li Wei, Li Ling (female), Li Wei, Li Tao, Li Chong, Li Qin (female), Li Shiqiang, Li Wenhui, Li Dongyan (female), Li Yaping (female), Li Guangyu, Li Hongxia (female), Li Liancheng, Li Yingjie, Li Shujian, Li Liufa, Li Haiyan (female), Yang Laifa, Yang Xuemei (female), Wu Jian, Wu Hao, Wu Yuanquan, Wu Yuanda, He Hong (female, Hui), Wang Zhongshan, Sha Baoqin (female, Hui), Song Jing (female), Song Fengnian, Song Huzhen, Song Dianyu, Zhang Yanming, Zhang Quanshou, Zhang Lixiao (female), Zhang Jianhui, Zhang Jiaxiang, Zhang Qinghai, Zhang Weining, Zhang Leiming, Chen Guozhen, Chen Run'er, Shao Changjin, Wu Weihua, Ouyang Changqiong, Zhi Hui(Female), Shang Chaoyang, Jin Buhuan, Zhou Hong (female), Zhou Qiang, Zhou Chongchen, Pang Guoming, Zhao Zhao (female, Hui), Zhao Qisan, Zhao Guoxiang, Zhao Suping (female), Zhao Yanshui, Zhao Hongtao (female), Hu Quan, Hu Wuyue, Hu Zhonghui, Hu Daocai, Gao Xiuju (female), Hou Qingguo, Yu Zhangfa, Jiang Ming, Yao Zhongliang, Qin Yinglin, Gu Xuefei, Dang Yongfu, Qian Ming,~~Xu Guang~~Xu Xiao (female), Xu Yixian, Xu Jichao, Xu Nuojin, Xu Dequan, Weng Jieming, Gao Ali (female), Gao Jianjun, Gao Xincai, Guo Hao, Guo Hongqi (Hui), Guo Jianhua (female), Guo Zhenhua, Tao Guanghui, Huang Yan (female), Huang Jiusheng, Huang Yumei (female), Gong Liqun, Gong Jianming, Liang Bing, Ge Shuqin (female), Jiang Yuqin (female), Cheng Fang (female, Manchu), Shu Qing (Manchu), You Yi, Xie Fuzhan, Xie Jingrong, Lu Junxia (female), Zhan Wenlong, Pei Chunliang, Liao Huage (female), Kan Quancheng, Xiong Weizheng, Fan Huitao, Xue Jingxia (female), Huo Haosheng, Huo Jinhua (female), Huo Xiaoli (female), Mu Weimin, Wei Ming	172	
2023	14th	Ding Bo, Yu Li, Wan Zhengfeng, Wan Ping, Ma Yuxia, Ma Jian, Ma Baozi, Ma Jing, Wang Yonghong, Wang Jun, Wang Xian, Wang Kai, Wang Shuang, Wang Hongyan, Wang Juntan, Wang Dujuan, Wang Lijuan, Wang Qihong, Wang Chengzhe, Wang Zhenli, Wang Xiaozhen, Wang Zhihui, Niu Xuefeng, Mao Jie, Mao Caitao, Kong Xiangqing, Shi Jubin, Tian Haitao, Cong Bin, Yin Le, Feng Qiya, Ning Jianhua, Ning Yaqiu, Si Fuchun, Xing Jinglong, Ji Bingwei, Qu Xiaoli, Lü Yang, Lü Miaoxia, Zhu Ming, Qiao Qiusheng, Zhuang Jianqiu, Liu Daijun, Liu Ning, Liu Hongyun, Liu Guozhong, An Kang, Qi Xinglei, Xu Weigang, Sun Jing, Sun Zhongling Sun Shougang, Sun Yunfeng, Sun Zhiguang, Mai Shirui, Li Mao, Li Ya, Li Ling, Li Peng, Li Chengwei, Li Yibo, Li Jiheng, Li Zhiwei, Li Liancheng, Li Mingjun, Li Xuewu, Li Haiyan, Li Yueyong, Li Jingze, Li Zhichao, Li Daofeng, Li Xiangyu, Li Cuili, Yang Qingchun, Wu Yuanda, Wu Lixia, He Xiong, He Huawu, He Yuling, Wang Rongxiu, Sha Baoqin, Song Zhaopu, Song Kexing, Zhang Gong, Zhang Ning, Zhang Jun, Zhang Tao, Zhang Shu, Zhang Wei, Zhang Yongtao, Zhang Quanshou, Zhang Qingsheng, Zhang Suojiang, Chen Nan, Chen Xing, Chen Zhiwei, Chen Guochang, Chen Guozhen, Chen Baochao, Chen Junge, Chen Peili, Shao Li, Shao Changjin, Shao Zengming, Wuhan Qi, Fan Fuzhong, Lin Hong, Zhi Hui, Jin Fang, Jin Buhuan, Jin Shuanggen, Pang Xinchang, Meng Xiangzhong, Zhao Zhao, Zhao Qingye, Zhao Hongguo, Hu Zhonghui, Hu Laiyun, Hu Daocai, Ru Zhengang, Duan Wenlong, Xin Chunying, Zu Leiming, Yao Zhongliang, Qin Hanfeng, Qin Yinglin, Qin Baoqiang, Yuan Yongxin, Gu Wanfa, Xu Xiao, Xu Yixian, Xu Qiuping, Xu Shengjie, Xu De Quan, Gao Yong, Gao Ke, Guo Li, Guo Hao, Guo Lei, Guo Yongjun, Guo Xingtian, Guo Zeyi, Guo Jianhua, Guo Guiyi, Guo Aihe, Tang Huajun, Hai Guoyong, Yue Guoyong, Huang Jiusheng, Cao Lanying, Cui Yinglin, Liang Like, Ge Shuqin, Zeng Chuirui, Zeng Deya, You Yi, Bai Xiangyang, Lou Yangsheng, Lei Xueqin, Chu Xiaofei, Cai Meng, Fan Zhen, Fan Huitao, Pan Feng, Huo Xiaoli, Dai Tianfang, Wei Jianping	174	
