= 12th National People's Congress =

2013–2018 Chinese legislative session

12th National People's Congress 第十二届全国人民代表大会
- National emblem of China

5 March 2013 – 5 March 2018 (5 years, 0 days) Overview
- Type: Supreme organ of state power
- Election: Indirect elections

Leadership
- Chairman: Zhang Dejiang
- Vice Chairmen: Li Jianguo, Wang Shengjun, Chen Changzhi, Yan Junqi, Wang Chen, Shen Yueyue, Ji Bingxuan, Zhang Ping, Qiangba Puncog, Arken Imirbaki, Wan Exiang, Zhang Baowen, and Chen Zhu
- Secretary-General: Wang Chen
- Standing Committee: 166 (12th)

Members
- Total: 2,987 members

12th National People's Congress
- Simplified Chinese: 第十二届全国人民代表大会
- Traditional Chinese: 第十二屆全國人民代表大會
Transcriptions
Standard Mandarin
- Hanyu Pinyin: Dì Shí'èrjiè Quánguó Rénmín Dàibiǎo Dàhuì

Abbreviation
- Simplified Chinese: 第十二届全国人大
- Traditional Chinese: 第十二屆全國人大
Transcriptions
Standard Mandarin
- Hanyu Pinyin: Dì Shí'èrjiè Quánguó Réndà

The 12th National People's Congress (NPC) was elected in national congressional conferences from October 2012 to February 2013 and was in session from 2013 to 2018. It succeeded the 11th National People's Congress. It held five plenary sessions in this period, occurring around early March every year. It was succeeded by the communing of the 13th National People's Congress.

== Seat distribution ==
Major party	General Secretary	Seats
Chinese Communist Party	Xi Jinping	2,157
Other Parties	Chairperson	Seats
Chinese Peasants' and Workers' Democratic Party	Sang Guowei	830
Jiusan Society	Han Qide	830
China Democratic League	Zhang Baowen	830
China Association for Promoting Democracy	Yan Junqi	830
China National Democratic Construction Association	Chen Changzhi	830
Revolutionary Committee of the Chinese Kuomintang	Wan Exiang	830
Taiwan Democratic Self-Government League	Lin Wenyi	830
China Zhi Gong Party	Wan Gang	830
Independents	N/A	830

== Organization ==
=== Council of Chairpersons ===
		Party	Term
Chairman	Zhang Dejiang	CCP	14 Mar. 2013 – 17 Mar. 2018
Vice Chairpersons	Li Jianguo	CCP	14 Mar. 2013 – 17 Mar. 2018
Vice Chairpersons	Wang Shengjun	CCP	14 Mar. 2013 – 17 Mar. 2018
Vice Chairpersons	Chen Changzhi	CCP	14 Mar. 2013 – 17 Mar. 2018
Vice Chairpersons	Yan Junqi	CAPD	14 Mar. 2013 – 17 Mar. 2018
Vice Chairpersons	Wang Chen	CCP	14 Mar. 2013 – 17 Mar. 2018
Vice Chairpersons	Shen Yueyue	CCP	14 Mar. 2013 – 17 Mar. 2018
Vice Chairpersons	Ji Bingxuan	CCP	14 Mar. 2013 – 17 Mar. 2018
Vice Chairpersons	Zhang Ping	CCP	14 Mar. 2013 – 17 Mar. 2018
Vice Chairpersons	Qiangba Puncog	CCP	14 Mar. 2013 – 17 Mar. 2018
Vice Chairpersons	Arken Imirbaki	CCP	14 Mar. 2013 – 17 Mar. 2018
Vice Chairpersons	Wan Exiang	RCCK	14 Mar. 2013 – 17 Mar. 2018
Vice Chairpersons	Zhang Baowen	CDL	14 Mar. 2013 – 17 Mar. 2018
Vice Chairpersons	Chen Zhu	CPWDP	14 Mar. 2013 – 17 Mar. 2018
Secretary-General	Wang Chen	CCP	14 Mar. 2013 – 17 Mar. 2018

=== Special Committees ===
Special committee	Chairperson
Ethnic Affairs Committee	Li Jingtian
Law Committee	Qiao Xiaoyang
Internal and Judicial Affairs Committee	Ma Wen
Financial and Economic Affairs Committee	Li Shenglin
Education, Science, Culture and Public Health Committee	Liu Binjie
Foreign Affairs Committee	Fu Ying
Overseas Chinese Affairs Committee	Bai Zhijian
Environment Protection and Resources Conservation Committee	Chen Jianguo
Agriculture and Rural Affairs Committee	Lu Hao

== The first session ==
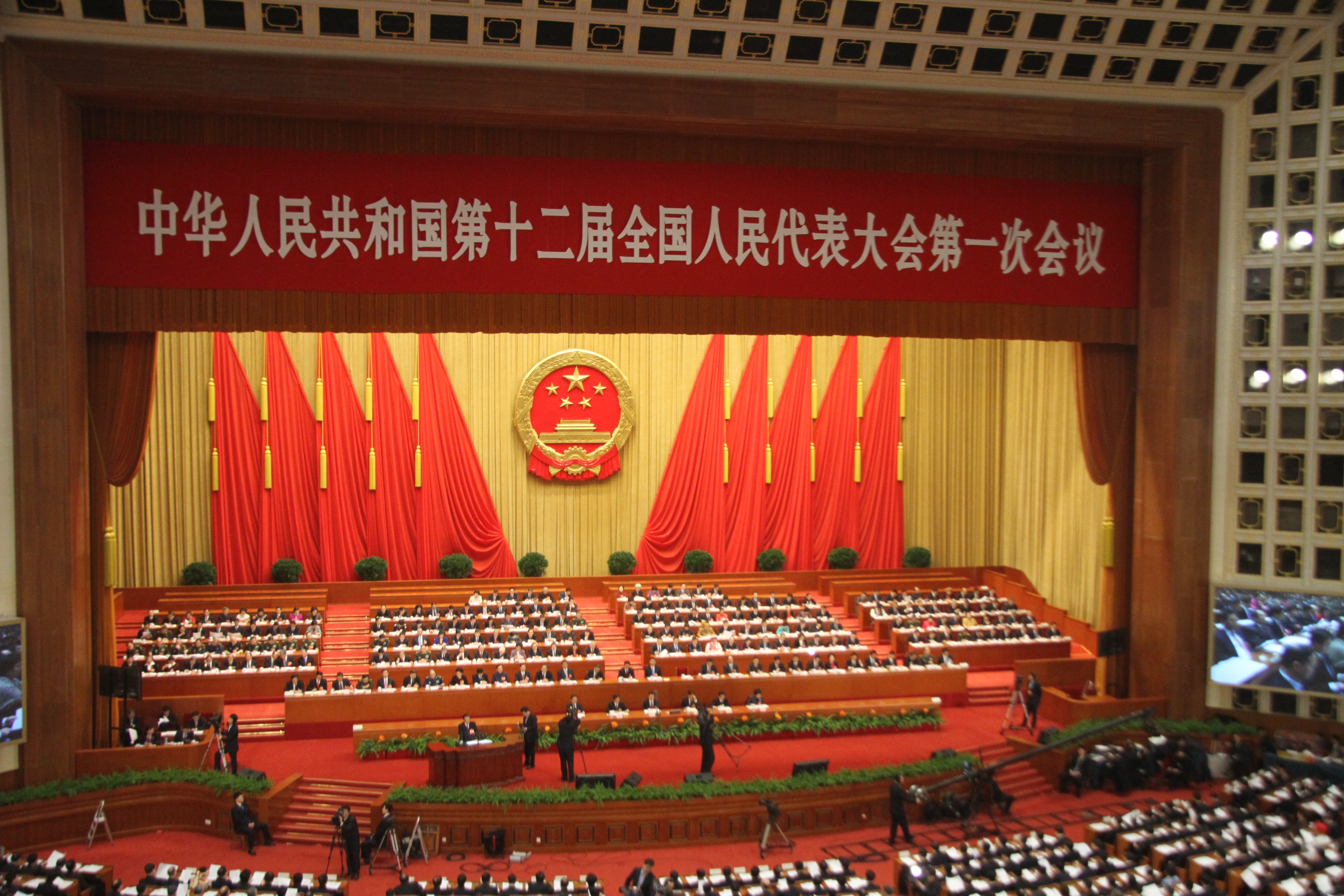
The first session of the 12th National People's Congress

The first session was held in March 2013. All top national posts were up for election and were filled.

NPCSC Chairman Election				NPCSC Secretary-general Election			
Candidates	For	Against	Abstain	Candidates	For	Against	Abstain
Zhang Dejiang	2,952	5	4	Wang Chen	2,923	30	7
Zhang Dejiang	2,952	5	4	Zhang Ping	1	0	0
Presidential Election				Vice-Presidential Election			
Candidates	For	Against	Abstain	Candidates	For	Against	Abstain
Xi Jinping	2,952	1	3	Li Yuanchao	2,839	80	37
Xi Jinping	2,952	1	3	Liu Yunshan	2	0	0
Xi Jinping	2,952	1	3	Li Hongzhong	1	0	0
Xi Jinping	2,952	1	3	Wang Yang	1	0	0
Xi Jinping	2,952	1	3	Yuan Chunqing	1	0	0
Xi Jinping	2,952	1	3	Pan Yiyang	1	0	0
CMC Chairmanship Election				Premierial Election			
Candidates	For	Against	Abstain	Candidates	For	Against	Abstain
Xi Jinping	2,955	1	3	Li Keqiang	2,940	3	6
Supreme Court President Election				Procurator-general Election			
Candidates	For	Against	Abstain	Candidates	For	Against	Abstain
Zhou Qiang	2908	26	23	Cao Jianming	2,933	18	5
Wu Aiying	2	0	0	Cao Jianming	2,933	18	5
Wang Shengjun	1	0	0	Chen Yunlong	1	0	0
Qi Qi	1	0	0	Cai Xueen	1	0	0

== The second session ==
The second session was held in March 2014.

== The third session ==
The third session was held in March 2015.

== The fourth session ==
The fourth session was held in March 2016.

== The fifth session ==
The fifth session was held in March 2017.
