= National People's Congress special committees =

Chinese legislative committee

A special committee (Chinese: 全国人民代表大会专门委员会; pinyin: Quánguó Rénmín Dàibiǎo Dàhuì Zhuānmén Wěiyuánhu) is a legislative committee in the National People's Congress (NPC), the national legislature of the People's Republic of China. Article 35 of the Organic Law of the National People's Congress specifies that the NPC shall create an Ethnic Affairs Committee, a Constitution and Law Committee (formerly just Law Committee), a Financial and Economic Affairs Committee, an Education, Science, Culture and Public Health Committee, a Foreign Affairs Committee, and an Overseas Chinese Affairs Committee, as well as any other special committees that it deems necessary. Over time, the NPC has added an Internal and Judicial Affairs Committee, an Environment Protection and Resources Conservation Committee, an Agriculture and Rural Affairs Committee, and Social Development Affairs Committee, for a total of ten special committees.

Article 37 of the Organic Law indicates that the functions of special committees are to include deliberating on bills and proposals received from the Presidium and Standing Committee, submitting bills and proposals to the same, examine and report on items considered to contravene the Constitution and laws, examine questions referred by the Presidium and Standing Committee, and investigate and propose solutions to issues. The Ethnic Affairs Committee can additionally make proposals to strengthen ethnic unity and review legislation related to the Autonomous regions of China. The Law Committee deliberates on all draft laws submitted to the NPC.

Shi Hexing, a professor at the Chinese Academy of Governance, has written that special committees have strengthened the NPC and the people's congress system as a whole. Wan Li, former Chairman of the National People's Congress, also emphasized the great importance of special committee. In 2005, the General Office of the NPC Standing Committee issued "Several Opinions on Giving Full Scope to the Role of Special Committees," which further strengthened them by setting a specific work system and procedures.

== Current special committees ==
| Special committee | Chairperson |
|---|---|
| Ethnic Affairs Committee | Bayanqolu |
| Constitution and Law Committee | Xin Chunying |
| Supervisory and Judicial Affairs Committee | Yang Xiaochao |
| Financial and Economic Affairs Committee | Zhong Shan |
| Education, Science, Culture and Public Health Committee | Luo Shugang |
| Foreign Affairs Committee | Lou Qinjian |
| Overseas Chinese Affairs Committee | Yu Weiguo |
| Environmental Protection and Resources Conservation Committee | Lu Xinshe |
| Agriculture and Rural Affairs Committee | Du Jiahao |
| Social Development Affairs Committee | Yang Zhenwu |
