= Bao Kexin =

Chinese politician and business executive (1952–2019)

Bao Kexin (Chinese: 包克辛; June 1952 – 10 August 2019) was a Chinese politician and business executive. He served as Vice Governor of Guizhou Province and CEO and Chairman of China Grain Reserves Corporation (Sinograin), a major state-owned enterprise.

== Biography ==
Bao was born in June 1952 in Hangzhou, Zhejiang, China. During the Cultural Revolution, he was a sent-down youth in Yanggao County, Shanxi Province from 1968 to 1978. He joined the Chinese Communist Party in 1973.

He studied at Shanxi University of Finance and Economics from 1978 to 1979, and at Beijing Economics Institute from 1979 to 1982. After graduating with a bachelor's degree in trade and economics, he worked for two decades at the State Planning Commission (later State Development Planning Commission). In July 2001, he became Director of the Department of Investment of the State Development Planning Commission. In August 2002, Bao was appointed Vice Governor of Guizhou Province in Southwest China.

In April 2007, Bao was appointed CEO of China Grain Reserves Corporation (Sinograin), a major state-owned enterprise, before becoming chairman in April 2012. His tenure at Sinograin was highly controversial, as the company was accused of interfering with China's grain market, and dozens of its managers were convicted of corruption. Li Changxuan (李长轩), Chairman of Sinograin's subsidiary in Henan Province, was sentenced to life imprisonment for taking bribes. Bao was dismissed in October 2015 and replaced as chairman by Zhao Shuanglian (赵双连).

Bao was a delegate to the 11th and 12th National People's Congress, and served as a member of the National People's Congress Agriculture and Rural Affairs Committee.

Bao died on 10 August 2019 in Beijing at the age of 67.
