= Zhao Dongwan =

Chinese politician

- 赵东宛

Chairperson of the Education, Science, Culture and Public Health Committee of the National People's Congress
- In office March 1993 – March 1998
- Preceded by: Zhou Gucheng
- Succeeded by: Zhu Kaixuan

Director of the Office of the Central Organization Establishment Committee
- In office July 1991 – May 1993
- Preceded by: New title
- Succeeded by: Song Defu

Minister of Personnel
- In office 1988–1993
- Premier: Li Peng
- Preceded by: New title
- Succeeded by: Song Defu

Minister of Labor and Personnel
- In office 1985–1988
- Premier: Zhao Ziyang; Li Peng
- Preceded by: Zhao Shouyi
- Succeeded by: Position revoked

Personal details
- Born: October 1926 Nanyang, Henan, China
- Died: 4 May 2020 (aged 93) Beijing, China
- Party: Chinese Communist Party
- Education: Beijing University of Technology

Chinese name
- Simplified Chinese: 赵东宛
- Traditional Chinese: 趙東宛
Transcriptions
Standard Mandarin
- Hanyu Pinyin: Zhào Dōngwǎn

Zhao Dongwan (Chinese: 赵东宛; October 1926 – 4 May 2020) was a Chinese politician who served as Minister of Labor and Personnel from 1985 to 1988, Minister of Personnel from 1988 to 1993, director of the Office of the Central Organization Establishment Committee from 1991 to 1993, and chairperson of the Education, Science, Culture and Public Health Committee of the National People's Congress from 1993 to 1998.

He was a representative of the 13th and 14th National Congress of the Chinese Communist Party. He was an alternate member of the 12th Central Committee of the Chinese Communist Party and a member of the 13th Central Committee of the Chinese Communist Party. He was a member of the Standing Committee of the 8th National People's Congress.

== Career ==
Zhao was born in Nanyang, Henan, in October 1926. He entered the revolutionary workforce in April 1938, and joined the Chinese Communist Party (CCP) in November 1941. In April 1940, he enrolled at Yan'an Academy of Natural Sciences (predecessor of Beijing University of Technology), which is the first science and engineering university founded by the CCP. He was transferred to the Eighth Route Army Medical University in 1943. Upon graduating in 1945, he became political commissar of Northeast Democratic United Army Field Hospital.

After the establishment of the Communist State in 1949, Zhao, who was 23-years-old at the time, was appointed as manager of Fushun Heavy Machinery Factory. Two years later, he was sent to the Soviet Union for further education. He returned to China in 1957 and that same year became director and chief engineer of the Fularji First Heavy Machinery Factory. In 1960, his team completed the construction task of the "First Heavy Machinery Factory", one year earlier than expected.

During the ten-year Cultural Revolution, he was removed from office and effectively sidelined.

Since 1977, he successively served as vice minister of the First Machinery Industry, deputy director of the National Science and Technology Commission, deputy director of the National Development and Reform Commission, director of the Office of the Science and Technology Leading Group of the State Council, director of the Office of the Central Leading Group for the Introduction of Intelligence, and director of the Office of the Computing Machinery Committee of the State Council. In 1984 he was made deputy secretary-seneral of the Central Leading Group for Finance and Economics of the CCP Central Committee and deputy director of the National Development and Reform Commission. In 1985, he was elevated to minister of Labor and Personnel and leader of the Military Cadre Placement Working Group of the State Council. In 1988, he was appointed as minister of the newly reshuffled Ministry of Personnel. In July 1991, he was chosen as director of the Office of the Central Organization Establishment Committee, he remained in that position until May 1993, when he was transferred to the National People's Congress and appointed chairperson of the Education, Science, Culture and Public Health Committee.

On 4 May 2020, he died from an illness in Beijing, at the age of 93.

== Honours and awards ==
- May 1996 Foreign Academician of the Russian Academy of Natural Sciences
- 2015 Commemorative Medal for the 70th Anniversary of the Victory of the War of Resistance Against Japan

Government offices
Preceded by Zhao Shouyi	Minister of Labor and Personnel; 1985–1988	Succeeded by Position revoked
New title	Minister of Personnel; 1988–1993	Succeeded by Song Defu
Party political offices
New title	Director of the Office of the Central Organization Establishment Committee; 1991–1993	Succeeded by Song Defu
Assembly seats
Preceded by Zhou Gucheng	Chairperson of the Education, Science, Culture and Public Health Committee of the National People's Congress; 1993–1998	Succeeded by Zhu Kaixuan
