= Social Development Affairs Committee =

Committee of the National People's Congress

- 全国人民代表大会社会建设委员会
- Formation: March 13, 2018
- Type: Special committee of the National People's Congress
- Legal status: Active
- Location: Beijing
- Chairperson: Yang Zhenwu
- Parent organization: National People's Congress; Standing Committee of the National People's Congress (when the NPC is not in session)

The Social Development Affairs Committee of the National People's Congress (Chinese: 全国人民代表大会社会建设委员会; pinyin: Quánguó Rénmín Dàibiǎo Dàhuì Shèhuì Jiànshè Wěiyuánhuì) is one of ten special committees of the National People's Congress, the national legislature of the People's Republic of China.

== History ==
The special committee was created on March 13, 2018, as part of the deepening the reform of the Party and state institutions.

== Chairpersons ==
Congress	Chairperson
13th National People's Congress	He Yiting
14th National People's Congress	Yang Zhenwu

== See also ==
- Committee for Social and Legal Affairs, CPPCC NC counterpart
