= Education, Science, Culture and Public Health Committee =

Committee of the National People's Congress in People's Republic of China

Education, Science, Culture and Public Health Committee of the National People's Congress
- 全国人民代表大会教育科学文化卫生委员会
- Formation: June 7, 1983
- Type: Special Committee of the National People's Congress
- Location: Beijing
- Chairperson: Luo Shugang
- Parent organization: National People's Congress; Standing Committee of the National People's Congress (when the NPC is not in session)

Chinese name
- Simplified Chinese: 全国人民代表大会教育科学文化卫生委员会
- Traditional Chinese: 全國人民代表大會教育科學文化衛生委員會
Transcriptions
Standard Mandarin
- Hanyu Pinyin: Quánguó Rénmín Dàibiǎo Dàhuì Jiàoyù Kēxué Wénhuà Wèishēng Wěiyuánhuì

Abbreviation
- Simplified Chinese: 全国人大教科文卫委员会
- Traditional Chinese: 全國人大教科文衛委員會
Transcriptions
Standard Mandarin
- Hanyu Pinyin: Quánguó Réndà Jiàokē Wénwèi Wěiyuánhuì

The Education, Science, Culture and Public Health Committee of the National People's Congress is one of nine special committees of the National People's Congress, the national legislature of the People's Republic of China. The special committee was created during the first session of the 6th National People's Congress in June 1983, and has existed for every National People's Congress since.

== Chairpersons ==
Congress	Chairperson
6th National People's Congress	Zhou Gucheng
7th National People's Congress	Zhou Gucheng
8th National People's Congress	Zhao Dongwan
9th National People's Congress	Zhu Kaixuan (朱开轩)
10th National People's Congress	Zhu Lilan
11th National People's Congress	Bai Keming
12th National People's Congress	Liu Binjie
13th National People's Congress	Li Xueyong
14th National People's Congress	Luo Shugang

== See also ==
- Committee of Education, Science, Health and Sports and Committee on Culture, Historical Data and Studies, CPPCC NC counterpart
