= Ethnic Affairs Committee =

Committee of the National People's Congress in People's Republic of China

Ethnic Affairs Committee of the National People's Congress
- 全国人民代表大会民族委员会
- Formation: September 28, 1954
- Type: Special Committee of the National People's Congress
- Location: Beijing
- Chairperson: Bayanqolu
- Parent organization: National People's Congress; Standing Committee of the National People's Congress (when the NPC is not in session)

Chinese name
- Simplified Chinese: 全国人民代表大会民族委员会
- Traditional Chinese: 全國人民代表大會民族委員會
Transcriptions
Standard Mandarin
- Hanyu Pinyin: Quánguó Rénmín Dàibiǎo Dàhuì Mínzú Wěiyuánhuì

Abbreviation
- Simplified Chinese: 全国人大民委
- Traditional Chinese: 全國人大民委
Transcriptions
Standard Mandarin
- Hanyu Pinyin: Quánguó Réndà Mínwěi

The Ethnic Affairs Committee of the National People's Congress is one of ten special committees of the National People's Congress. The special committee was created during the first session of the 1st National People's Congress in September 1954, and has existed for every National People's Congress except the 4th National People's Congress, during which it was suspended due to the Cultural Revolution.

== Functions ==
The committee is responsible for deliberating, proposing and drafting laws and regulations related to ethnic minorities in China. According to the Organic Law of the NPC, the Ethnic Affairs Committee is tasked with reviewing "autonomous regulations" as well as the separate regulations submitted by autonomous regions to the NPC Standing Committee (NPCSC) for approval.

== Chairpersons ==
Congress	Chairperson	Ethnicity of Chairperson
1st National People's Congress	Liu Geping	Hui
2nd National People's Congress	Liu Geping	Hui
3rd National People's Congress	Xie Fumin (谢扶民)	Zhuang
4th National People's Congress	Suspended	
5th National People's Congress	Ngapoi Ngawang Jigme	Tibetan
6th National People's Congress	Ngapoi Ngawang Jigme	Tibetan
7th National People's Congress	Ngapoi Ngawang Jigme	Tibetan
8th National People's Congress	Wang Chaowen	Miao
9th National People's Congress	Wang Chaowen	Miao
10th National People's Congress	Doje Cering	Tibetan
11th National People's Congress	Ma Qizhi	Hui
12th National People's Congress	Li Jingtian	Manchu
13th National People's Congress	Bai Chunli	Manchu
14th National People's Congress	Bayanqolu	Mongol

== See also ==
- United Front Work Department
- Committee for Ethnic and Religious Affairs, CPPCC NC counterpart
- National Ethnic Affairs Commission
