= 13th National People's Congress =

2018–2023 Chinese legislative session

13th National People's Congress 第十三届全国人民代表大会
- National emblem of China

5 March 2018 – 5 March 2023 (5 years, 0 days) Overview
- Type: Supreme organ of state power
- Election: Indirect elections

Leadership
- Chairman: Li Zhanshu
- Vice Chairmen: Wang Chen, Cao Jianming, Zhang Chunxian, Shen Yueyue, Ji Bingxuan, Arken Imirbaki, Wan Exiang, Chen Zhu, Wang Dongming, Padma Choling, Ding Zhongli, Hao Mingjin, Cai Dafeng, and Wu Weihua
- Secretary-General: Yang Zhenwu
- Standing Committee: 175 (13th)

Members
- Total: 2,980 members

13th National People's Congress
- Simplified Chinese: 第十三届全国人民代表大会
- Traditional Chinese: 第十三屆全國人民代表大會
Transcriptions
Standard Mandarin
- Hanyu Pinyin: Dì Shísānjiè Quánguó Rénmín Dàibiǎo Dàhuì

Abbreviation
- Simplified Chinese: 第十三届全国人大
- Traditional Chinese: 第十三屆全國人大
Transcriptions
Standard Mandarin
- Hanyu Pinyin: Dì Shísānjiè Quánguó Réndà

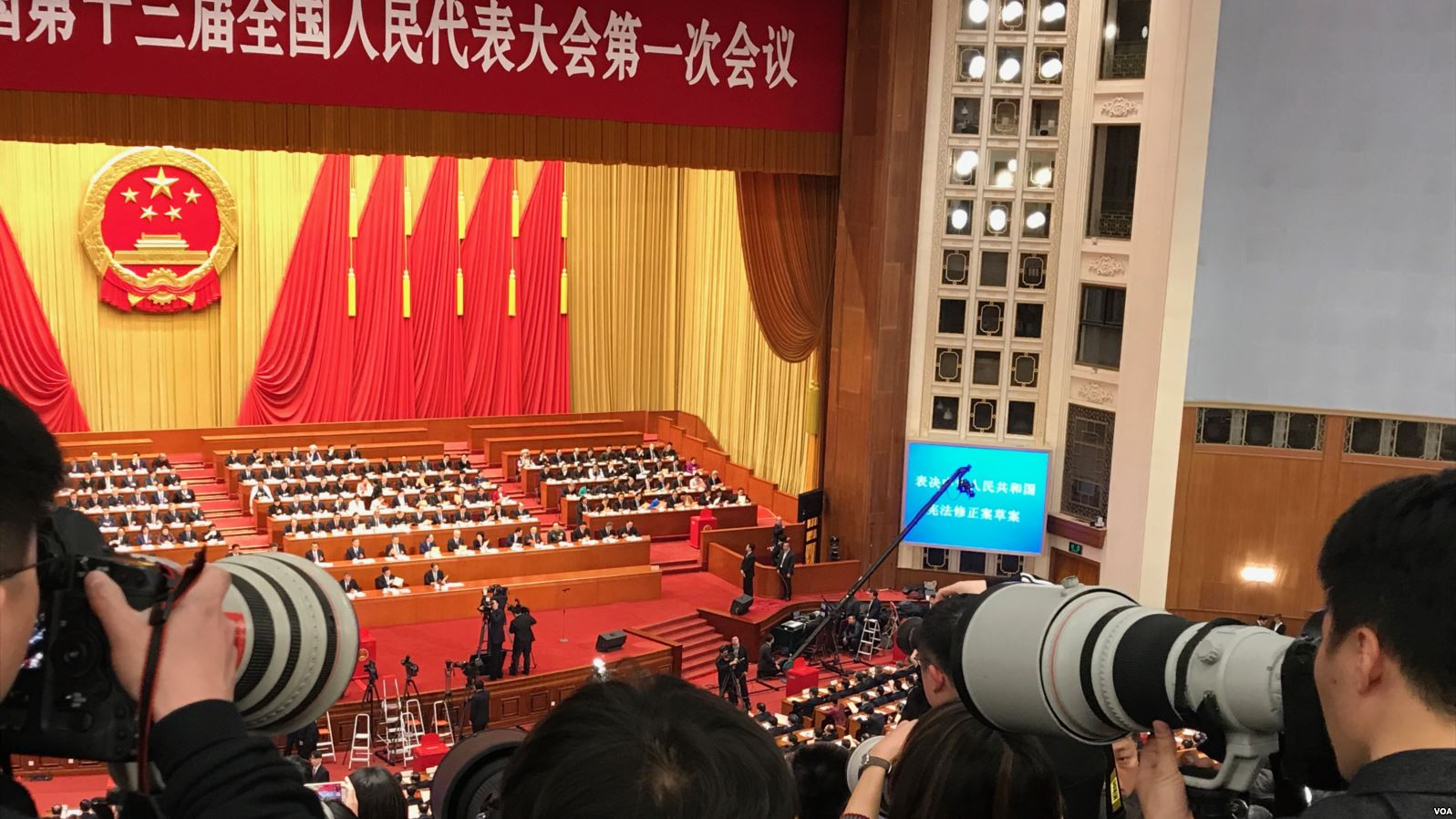
The 1st Session of the 13th National People's Congress

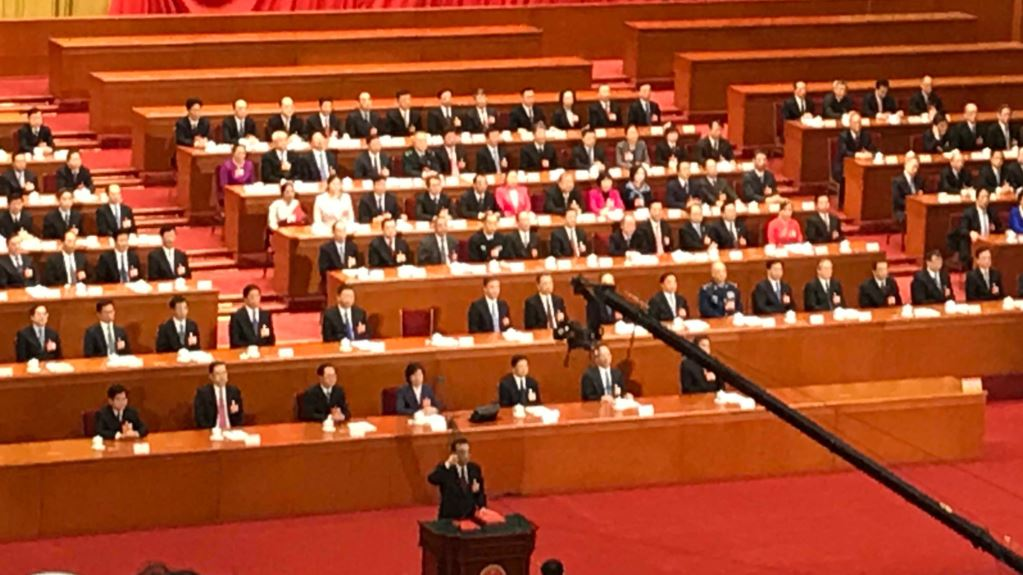
Li Keqiang publicly swore an oath to the constitution upon formally taking office after he was appointed as the Premier.

The 13th National People's Congress (NPC) was elected from October 2017 to February 2018 and was in session in the five-year period from 2018 to 2023. It held five sessions in this period, occurring around early March every year until before 2023, when the 14th National People's Congress first convened.

== Seat distribution ==
Major party	General Secretary	Seats
Chinese Communist Party	Xi Jinping	2119
Other Parties	Chairperson	Seats
Jiusan Society	Wu Weihua	64
China Democratic League	Ding Zhongli	58
China National Democratic Construction Association	Hao Mingjin	57
China Association for Promoting Democracy	Cai Dafeng	55
Chinese Peasants' and Workers' Democratic Party	Chen Zhu	54
Revolutionary Committee of the Chinese Kuomintang	Wan Exiang	43
China Zhi Gong Party	Wan Gang	38
Taiwan Democratic Self-Government League	Su Hui	13
Independents	N/A	479

=== Standing Committee ===
Major party	Seats
Chinese Communist Party	116
Other Parties	Seats
China Democratic League	9
China Association for Promoting Democracy	7
Chinese Peasants' and Workers' Democratic Party	7
Revolutionary Committee of the Chinese Kuomintang	6
Jiusan Society	4
China National Democratic Construction Association	3
China Zhi Gong Party	3
Taiwan Democratic Self-Government League	3
Independents	10

== Organization ==
=== Council of Chairpersons ===
		Party	Term
Chairman	Li Zhanshu	CCP	17 Mar. 2018 – 10 Mar. 2023
Vice Chairpersons	Wang Chen	CCP	17 Mar. 2018 – 10 Mar. 2023
Vice Chairpersons	Cao Jianming	CCP	17 Mar. 2018 – 10 Mar. 2023
Vice Chairpersons	Zhang Chunxian	CCP	17 Mar. 2018 – 10 Mar. 2023
Vice Chairpersons	Shen Yueyue	CCP	17 Mar. 2018 – 10 Mar. 2023
Vice Chairpersons	Ji Bingxuan	CCP	17 Mar. 2018 – 10 Mar. 2023
Vice Chairpersons	Arken Imirbaki	CCP	17 Mar. 2018 – 10 Mar. 2023
Vice Chairpersons	Wan Exiang	RCCK	17 Mar. 2018 – 10 Mar. 2023
Vice Chairpersons	Chen Zhu	CPWDP	17 Mar. 2018 – 10 Mar. 2023
Vice Chairpersons	Wang Dongming	CCP	17 Mar. 2018 – 10 Mar. 2023
Vice Chairpersons	Padma Choling	CCP	17 Mar. 2018 – 10 Mar. 2023
Vice Chairpersons	Ding Zhongli	CDL	17 Mar. 2018 – 10 Mar. 2023
Vice Chairpersons	Hao Mingjin	CNDCA	17 Mar. 2018 – 10 Mar. 2023
Vice Chairpersons	Cai Dafeng	CAPD	17 Mar. 2018 – 10 Mar. 2023
Vice Chairpersons	Wu Weihua	JS	17 Mar. 2018 – 10 Mar. 2023
Secretary-General	Yang Zhenwu	CCP	17 Mar. 2018 – 10 Mar. 2023

=== Special Committees ===
Special committee	Chairperson
Ethnic Affairs Committee	Bai Chunli
Constitution and Law Committee	Li Fei
Supervisory and Judicial Affairs Committee	Wu Yuliang
Financial and Economic Affairs Committee	Xu Shaoshi
Education, Science, Culture and Public Health Committee	Li Xueyong
Foreign Affairs Committee	Zhang Yesui
Overseas Chinese Affairs Committee	Wang Guangya
Environment Protection and Resources Conservation Committee	Gao Hucheng
Agriculture and Rural Affairs Committee	Chen Xiwen
Social Development Affairs Committee	He Yiting

== The first session ==
The first session opened on 5 March 2018 and closed on 20 March 2018. All major state positions were elected in this session, including President, Vice President, Premier, and Congress Chairman.

=== Election results ===
NPCSC Chairman Election				NPCSC Secretary-general Election			
Candidates	For	Against	Abstain	Candidates	For	Against	Abstain
Li Zhanshu	2970	0	0	Yang Zhenwu	2970	0	0
Presidential Election				Vice-Presidential Election			
Candidates	For	Against	Abstain	Candidates	For	Against	Abstain
Xi Jinping	2970	0	0	Wang Qishan	2969	1	0
NPCSC Vice-chairmen Election				NSC Director Election			
Candidates	For	Against	Abstain	Candidates	For	Against	Abstain
Wang Chen	2970	0	0	Yang Xiaodu	2969	1	0
Cao Jianming	2970	0	0	Yang Xiaodu	2969	1	0
Zhang Chunxian	2969	1	0	Yang Xiaodu	2969	1	0
Shen Yueyue	2969	1	0	Yang Xiaodu	2969	1	0
Ji Bingxuan	2970	0	0	Yang Xiaodu	2969	1	0
Arken Imirbaki	2970	0	0	Yang Xiaodu	2969	1	0
Wan Exiang	2970	0	0	Yang Xiaodu	2969	1	0
Chen Zhu	2970	0	0	Liu Yuan	2	0	0
Wang Dongming	2969	1	0	Liu Yuan	2	0	0
Padma Choling	2970	0	0	Liu Yuan	2	0	0
Ding Zhongli	2968	1	1	Liu Yuan	2	0	0
Hao Mingjin	2970	0	0	Liu Yuan	2	0	0
Cai Dafeng	2969	1	0	Liu Yuan	2	0	0
Wu Weihua	2970	0	0	Liu Yuan	2	0	0
Premierial Election				Vice-Premierial Election			
Li Keqiang	2964	2	0	Han Zheng	2965	4	0
Li Keqiang	2964	2	0	Sun Chunlan	2956	5	8
Li Keqiang	2964	2	0	Hu Chunhua	2968	0	1
Li Keqiang	2964	2	0	Liu He	2964	3	2
CMC Chairmanship Election				CMC Vice-Chairmanship Election			
Candidates	For	Against	Abstain	Candidates	For	Against	Abstain
Xi Jinping	2970	0	0	Xu Qiliang	2962	0	4
Xi Jinping	2970	0	0	Zhang Youxia	2963	2	1
Supreme Court President Election				Procurator-general Election			
Candidates	For	Against	Abstain	Candidates	For	Against	Abstain
Zhou Qiang	2956	5	5	Zhang Jun	2951	5	10

== The second session ==
The second session opened on 5 March 2019 and concluded on 15 March 2019.

== The third session ==
The third session was scheduled for March 5, 2020, but was delayed due to the COVID-19 pandemic, the first time such a postponement had happened in decades. After the announcement of the date in April, the session was held from May 22 to May 28, 2020.

== The fourth session ==
The fourth session opened on 5 March and concluded on 11 March 2021.

== The fifth session ==
The fifth session opened on 5 March and concluded on 11 March 2022.
