= Constitution and Law Committee =

Committee of the National People's Congress in People's Republic of China

- 全国人民代表大会宪法和法律委员会
- Abbreviation: (全国人大宪法和法律委员会)
- Formation: June 7, 1983
- Type: Special committee of the National People's Congress
- Legal status: Active
- Location: Beijing
- Chairperson: Xin Chunying
- Parent organization: National People's Congress; Standing Committee of the National People's Congress (when the NPC is not in session)

The Constitution and Law Committee of the National People's Congress (Chinese: 全国人民代表大会宪法和法律委员会; pinyin: Quánguó Rénmín Dàibiǎo Dàhuì Xiànfǎ hé Fǎlǜ Wěiyuánhuì) is one of ten special committees of the National People's Congress, the national legislature of the People's Republic of China.

== History ==
The special committee was created as the Law Committee of the National People's Congress during the first session of the 6th National People's Congress in June 1983, and has existed for every National People's Congress since. In 2018, it was renamed as the National People's Congress Constitution and Law Committee as part of the deepening the reform of the Party and state institutions.

== Chairpersons ==
Congress	Chairperson
6th National People's Congress	Peng Chong (彭冲)
7th National People's Congress	Wang Hanbin (王汉斌)
8th National People's Congress	Xue Ju (薛驹)
9th National People's Congress	Wang Weicheng (王维澄)
10th National People's Congress	Yang Jingyu (杨景宇)
11th National People's Congress	Hu Kangsheng (胡康生)
12th National People's Congress	Qiao Xiaoyang (乔晓阳)
13th National People's Congress	Li Fei (李飞)
14th National People's Congress	Xin Chunying (信春鹰)

== See also ==
- Committee for Handling Proposals and Committee for Social and Legal Affairs, CPPCC NC counterparts
