= Yang Taifang =

Chinese politician

- 杨泰芳

President of the All-China Federation of Returned Overseas Chinese
- In office 1994–1999
- Preceded by: Zhuang Yanlin
- Succeeded by: Lin Zhaoshu

Chairperson of the Overseas Chinese Affairs Committee of the National People's Congress
- In office 1993–1998
- Preceded by: Ye Fei
- Succeeded by: Gan Ziyu

Minister of Posts and Telecommunications
- In office 1984–1994
- Preceded by: Wen Minsheng
- Succeeded by: Wu Jichuan

Personal details
- Born: 30 April 1927 Mei County, Guangdong, China
- Died: 17 July 2012 (aged 85) Beijing, China
- Party: Chinese Communist Party
- Education: South China University of Technology

Chinese name
- Simplified Chinese: 杨泰芳
- Traditional Chinese: 楊泰芳
Transcriptions
Standard Mandarin
- Hanyu Pinyin: Yáng Tàifāng

Yang Taifang (Chinese: 杨泰芳; 30 April 1927 – 17 July 2012) was a Chinese politician who served as minister of posts and telecommunications from 1984 to 1994, chairperson of the Overseas Chinese Affairs Committee of the National People's Congress from 1993 to 1998, and president of the All-China Federation of Returned Overseas Chinese from 1994 to 1999.

He was an alternate member of the 12th Central Committee of the Chinese Communist Party. He was a member of the 12th and 13th Central Committee of the Chinese Communist Party. He was a member of the Standing Committee of the 8th National People's Congress.

== Early life and education ==
Yang was born in Mei County, Guangdong, on 30 April 1927. In 1945, he entered South China University of Technology, where he majored in telecommunication. He joined the Chinese Communist Party (CCP) in April 1948, during his junior year.

== Career ==
After university in 1949, Yang worked in British Hong Kong.

After the founding the Communist State in October 1949, he moved to Guangzhou, serving as a member of the Organization Department of the South China Branch of the CCP Central Committee. In July 1953, he became deputy director of the Long Distance Telecommunications Department and director of the Infrastructure Department of the Guangdong Provincial Administration of Posts and Telecommunications, as well as director and party secretary of the Guangdong Provincial Institute of Posts and Telecommunications.

In 1966, the Cultural Revolution broke out. He was removed from office and effectively sidelined. He was sent to the May Seventh Cadre Schools to do farm works in Yingde. He was reinstated as vice president and deputy party secretary of the China Academy of Telecommunications Technology (now Datang Telecom Group). He was chosen as vice minister of posts and telecommunications in 1982, and two years later promoted to the minister position. He was chairperson of the Overseas Chinese Affairs Committee of the National People's Congress in 1993, in addition to serving as president of the All-China Federation of Returned Overseas Chinese since 1994.

Yang retired in May 2004. On 17 July 2012, he died from an illness in Beijing, at the age of 84.

Government offices
Preceded by Wen Minsheng	Minister of Posts and Telecommunications; 1984–1994	Succeeded by Wu Jichuan
Assembly seats
Preceded by Ye Fei	Chairperson of the Overseas Chinese Affairs Committee of the National People's Congress; 1993–1998	Succeeded by Gan Ziyu
Civic offices
Preceded by Zhuang Yanlin	President of the All-China Federation of Returned Overseas Chinese; 1994–1999	Succeeded by Lin Zhaoshu
