= Agriculture and Rural Affairs Committee =

Committee of the National People's Congress in People's Republic of China

- 全国人民代表大会农业与农村委员会
- Abbreviation: (全国人大农业与农村委员会)
- Formation: March 1998
- Type: Special committee of the National People's Congress
- Legal status: Active
- Location: Beijing
- Chairperson: Du Jiahao
- Parent organization: National People's Congress; Standing Committee of the National People's Congress (when the NPC is not in session)

The Agriculture and Rural Affairs Committee of the National People's Congress (Chinese: 全国人民代表大会农业与农村委员会; pinyin: Quánguó Rénmín Dàibiǎo Dàhuì Nóngyè Yǔ Nóngcūn Wěiyuánhuì) is one of nine special committees of the National People's Congress, the national legislature of the People's Republic of China. The special committee was created during the first session of the 9th National People's Congress in March 1998, and has existed for every National People's Congress since.

== Membership ==
Congress	Chairperson	Vice-Chairs	Members
9th National People's Congress	Gao Dezhan (高德占)	Liu Suinian (柳随年); Yang Zhenhuai (杨振怀); Liu Zhongyi (刘中一); Wu Jinghua (伍精华); Hong Fuzeng (洪绂曾); Li Chunting (李春亭) (supplementary appointment on December 29, 2001); Liu Fangren (supplementary appointment on April 28, 2002)	Yu Hanqing (于汉卿); Wang Lianzheng (王连铮); Mao Daru (毛达如); Bai Shangwu (白尚武); Ren Zhenglong (任正隆); Xu Xingguan (许行贯); Yan Keqiang (严克强); Su Changpei (苏昌培); Li Laizhu (李来柱); Li Meifang (李梅芳); Li Denghai (李登海); Li Dianrong (李殿荣); Yang Xinren (杨新人); Yang Yongzhe (杨雍哲); Shen Zhejiang (沈珠江); Zhang Bailing (张百良); Chen Jiyuan (陈吉元); Luo Fuhe (罗富和); Cao Shuangming; Xie Yong (谢勇)
10th National People's Congress	Liu Mingzu (刘明祖)	Shu Huiguo; Li Chunting (李春亭); Wan Baorui (万宝瑞); Lu Ming (路明); Wang Yunlong (王云龙) (supplementary appointment on December 29, 2005); Tang Tianbiao (唐天标) (supplementary appointment on December 29, 2005); Zhang Zhongwei (supplementary appointment on February 28, 2007); Ma Qizhi (马启智) (supplementary appointment on April 27, 2007)	Wang Tailan (王太岚); Wang Ruzhen (王如珍); Ren Zhenglong (任正隆); Hua Fuzhou (华福周) (removed August 27, 2003); Liu Zhenwei (刘振伟); Li Hua (李华); Li Meifang (李梅芳); Li Denghai (李登海); Yang Xinren (杨新人); Zhang Bailiang (张百良); Zhang Jinbao (张进宝); Chen Jiyuan (陈吉元); Tu Dao Duo Ji (图道多吉); Shan Rongfan (单荣范); Sang Fengwen (桑逢文); Peng Zhenkun (彭振坤); Han Xinmin (韩新民); Jing Xueqin (景学勤); Cheng Yiju (程贻举)
11th National People's Congress	Wang Yunlong (王云龙)	Wang Yunkun (王云坤); Sun Wensheng (孙文盛); Zhang Zhongwei; Li Qianyuan (李乾元); Yin Chengjie (尹成杰); Suo Lisheng (索丽生); Fang Fengyou (房凤友) (supplementary appointment on April 24, 2008); Liu Zhenwei (刘振伟) (supplementary appointment on December 27, 2008); Fu Tinggui (supplementary appointment on February 26, 2010); Wang Jinshan (supplementary appointment on June 25, 2010); Li Chengyu (supplementary appointment on August 26, 2011); Chen Guangguo (陈光国) (supplementary appointment on February 29, 2012)	Ma Changyi (马昌裔); Wang Mingyi (王明义); Ulan Bater (乌兰巴特尔); Bao Kexin; Ren Zhenglong (任正隆); Hua Fuzhou (华福周); Zhuang Xian (庄先); Liu Zhenwei (刘振伟) (elevated to vice-chair on December 27, 2008); Sun Qixin (孙其信); Li Denghai (李登海); Li Dianren (李殿仁); Zhang Xiaoshan (张晓山); Gou Tianlin (苟天林); Liang Heng (梁衡); Cheng Yiju (程贻举); Cai Fang (蔡昉)
12th National People's Congress	Chen Jianguo (陈建国)	Wang Jinshan; Ou Guangyuan (欧广源); Chen Guangguo (陈光国); Wang Guosheng; Long Zhuangwei (龙庄伟); Jiang Fan (江帆); Liu Zhenwei (刘振伟); Tang Shuangning (唐双宁)	Bao Kexin; Xu Weigang (许为钢); Li Denghai (李登海); He Dongping (何东平); He Yinghua (何映华); Zhang Zuoha (张作哈); Zhang Xiaoshan (张晓山); Chen Daheng (陈达恒); Chen Chuanshu (陈传书); Guo Junbo (郭俊波); Cao Weixin (曹维新); Jiang Xingsan (蒋省三); Cai Fang (蔡昉); Zhai Huqu (翟虎渠)
13th National People's Congress	Chen Xiwen		
14th National People's Congress	Du Jiahao (杜家毫)		

== See also ==
- Committee for Agriculture and Rural Affairs, CPPCC NC counterpart
