= Shanxi University of Finance and Economics =

University in Shanxi, China

- 山西财经大学
- Motto: 修德立信,博学求真
- Type: Public
- Established: 1951
- Faculty: 1,700
- Students: 22,000
- Undergraduates: 16,900
- Postgraduates: 3,500
- Location: Taiyuan, Shanxi, China
- Campus: Urban
- Website: http://www.sxufe.edu.cn/

Shanxi University of Finance and Economics (abbr. as SXUFE) (simplified Chinese: 山西财经大学; traditional Chinese: 山西財經大學; pinyin: shanxi cáijīng dàxué), founded in 1951, is one of the earliest financial universities in China. The university sticks to highlighting the academic characteristics and advantages of Economics and Management, focusing on Economics, Management and Laws as the mainstay subjects and developing interdependently Economics, Management, Laws, Literal Arts, Science, Engineering and Teaching.

== History ==
Shanxi University of Finance and Economics was founded in 1951, which is one of the forerunners in the field of higher education of finance and economics in China. In September 1958, the five cadres schools were merged to form the Shanxi Finance and Economics Institute (SXFEI). Shanxi Economic Management Institute (SXEMI) was founded in 1984. In October 1997, with the approval of the former China State Educational Committee, SXFEI and SXEMI were merged composing SXUFE, which was under the control of the Shanxi Province and Ministry of Education. Since 2000, SXUFE has been shifted to mainly administrate by Shanxi Province.

== Rankings ==
SXUFEs comprehensive ability in running a university is improving steadily. It has entered the list of the top 100 universities of social sciences and ranks 11th among all the universities of finance and economics in China. In the aspect of scientific innovation and competitiveness, SXUFE is in the list of the top 100 universities of social sciences.

== Academics ==
Research of all kinds at SXUFE is increasing in quantity, quality, and diversity. Of all the research, 13 are of state level; 275 of provincial or ministerial level; and 31 are horizontal subjects. About 1,496 papers were published in key journals, among which 278 were published in state journals; 12 entered the five major paper indexing system; 64 received provincial or ministerial awards.

In 2005, SXUFE received two nationally funded projects in natural sciences and three in social sciences and 22 research projects received Shanxi Excellent Research Award. SXUFE was approved to carry out 25 research subjects in the validation of 2005 research subjects in "the tenth Five" plan for Shanxi philosophy and social sciences. For this approval, SXUFE continues to rank first of all the applying institutions.

== Students ==
There are more than 22,000 students are registered at SXUFE, including 17,000 full-time undergraduate students and 3,500 graduates and PhD candidates. The others are adult students from the schools of Continuing Education and Online Education.

== Alumni ==
- Bao Kexin, '78-'79, CEO of China Grain Reserves Corporation
- Cai Esheng, '82 Vice-Chairman of China Banking Regulatory Commission
- Feng Shuping, '78 Vice-Director of Budget Committee of the Standing Committee of the National People's Congress
- Ma Xulun, '84 Executive Director, CEO of China Eastern Airlines
- Feng Hongping, Vice-Chairman at Morgan Stanley China
- Lan Yisheng, Professor of Shanghai University of Finance and Economics
- Mai Tianshu, '82 Author and Writer
- Pan Hongliang, Vice-President of China Grain Reserves Corporation.
- Sun Baohou, '81 Auditor-in-Chief of National Audit Office of the People's Republic of China
- Wang Liyan, '82 Professor of Guanghua School of Management at Peking University
- Yuan Bing, Vice-President of TCL Group
- Yuan Hongqi, Professor of Shanghai University of Finance and Economics
- Zhang Hongli, Executive Vice President and COO of China Investment Corporation
