= Foreign Affairs Committee of the National People's Congress =

Chinese government committee

Foreign Affairs Committee
- 全国人民代表大会外事委员会
- Abbreviation: (全国人大外事委员会)
- Formation: June 7, 1983
- Type: Special committee of the National People's Congress
- Legal status: Active
- Location: Beijing
- Chairperson: Lou Qinjian
- Parent organization: National People's Congress; Standing Committee of the National People's Congress (when the NPC is not in session)

The Foreign Affairs Committee of the National People's Congress (Chinese: 全国人民代表大会外事委员会; pinyin: Quánguó Rénmín Dàibiǎo Dàhuì Wàishì Wěiyuánhuì) is one of nine special committees of the National People's Congress (NPC), the national legislature of the People's Republic of China. The special committee was created during the first session of the 6th National People's Congress in June 1983, and has existed for every National People's Congress since.

Composed of a chairman, a number of vice-chairmen, and several members, the Foreign Affairs Committee is responsible for reviewing and deliberating on proposed legislation regarding foreign affairs including the signing or abrogation of treaties and agreements with other nations for delivery to the NPC, reviewing and replying to inquiries submitted by the NPC regarding foreign affairs, communicate with foreign counterparts, make statements for major issues related to Chinese foreign affairs, present briefings to relevant departments on international issues, and all other tasks given it by the National People's Congress.

== Membership ==
Role	English name	Chinese name	Background
Chairwoman	Fu Ying	傅莹	Ministry of Foreign Affairs
Vice-Chairman	Chi Wanchun	迟万春	PLA political commissar
Vice-Chairman	Liu Xiaojiang	刘晓江	PLAN political commissar
Vice-Chairman	Xiu Fujin	修福金	
Vice-Chairman	Wang Xiaochu	王晓初	Telecom
Vice-Chairwoman	Zhao Shaohua	赵少华	Telecom
Vice-Chairman	Cao Weizhou	曹卫洲	International Liaison Department
Vice-Chairwoman	Zhao Baige	赵白鸽	Red Cross Society
Vice-Chairman	Chen Fengxiang	陈凤翔	International Liaison Department
Vice-Chairman	Guo Lei	郭雷	Academician
Member	Ma Zehua	马泽华	
Member	Wang Songhe	王松鹤	General Administration of Customs
Member	Li Yihu	李义虎	University dean
Member	Yang Jianting	杨建亭	PLA political commissar
Member	Chen Xiaogong	陈小工	PLAAF
Member	Gao Zhiguo	高之国	ITLOS
Member	Jing Wenchun	景文春	PLAAF
Member	Lu Jianping	路建平	CCP Propaganda Department
Source: NPC Foreign Affairs Official Website

Congress	Chairperson
6th National People's Congress	Geng Biao (耿飚)
7th National People's Congress	Liao Hansheng (廖汉生)
8th National People's Congress	Zhu Liang (朱良)
9th National People's Congress	Zeng Jianhui (曾建徽)
10th National People's Congress	Jiang Enzhu (姜恩柱)
11th National People's Congress	Li Zhaoxing (李肇星)
12th National People's Congress	Fu Ying (傅莹)
13th National People's Congress	Zhang Yesui (张业遂)
14th National People's Congress	Lou Qinjian (娄勤俭)

== See also ==
- Committee of Foreign Affairs, CPPCC NC counterpart
