= Overseas Chinese Affairs Committee =

Committee of the National People's Congress in People's Republic of China

Overseas Chinese Affairs Committee of the National People's Congress
- 全国人民代表大会华侨委员会
- Formation: June 7, 1983
- Type: Special Committee of the National People's Congress
- Location: Beijing
- Chairperson: Yu Weiguo
- Parent organization: National People's Congress; Standing Committee of the National People's Congress (when the NPC is not in session)

Chinese name
- Simplified Chinese: 全国人民代表大会华侨委员会
- Traditional Chinese: 全國人民代表大會華僑委員會
Transcriptions
Standard Mandarin
- Hanyu Pinyin: Quánguó Rénmín Dàibiǎo Dàhuì Huáqiáo Wěiyuánhuì

Abbreviation
- Simplified Chinese: 全国人大华侨委员会
- Traditional Chinese: 全國人大華僑委員會
Transcriptions
Standard Mandarin
- Hanyu Pinyin: Quánguó Réndà Huáqiáo Wěiyuánhuì

The Overseas Chinese Affairs Committee of the National People's Congress is one of ten special committees of the National People's Congress, the national legislature of the People's Republic of China. The special committee was created during the first session of the 6th National People's Congress in June 1983, and has existed for every National People's Congress since.

== Chairpersons ==
Congress	Chairperson
6th National People's Congress	Ye Fei
7th National People's Congress	Ye Fei
8th National People's Congress	Yang Taifang
9th National People's Congress	Gan Ziyu (甘子玉)
10th National People's Congress	Chen Guangyi
11th National People's Congress	Gao Siren
12th National People's Congress	Bai Zhijian
13th National People's Congress	Wang Guangya
14th National People's Congress	Yu Weiguo

== See also ==
- Committee for Liaison with Hong Kong, Macao, Taiwan and Overseas Chinese, CPPCC NC counterpart
