= 11th National People's Congress =

2008–2013 Chinese legislative session

11th National People's Congress 第十一届全国人民代表大会
- National emblem of China

5 March 2008 – 5 March 2013 (5 years, 0 days) Overview
- Type: Supreme organ of state power
- Election: Indirect elections

Leadership
- Chairman: Wu Bangguo
- Vice Chairmen: Wang Zhaoguo, Lu Yongxiang, Uyunqimg, Han Qide, Hua Jianmin, Chen Zhili, Zhou Tienong, Li Jianguo, Ismail Tiliwaldi, Jiang Shusheng, Chen Changzhi, Yan Junqi, and Sang Guowei
- Secretary-General: Li Jianguo
- Standing Committee: 175 (11th)

Members
- Total: 2,987 members

11th National People's Congress
- Traditional Chinese: 第十一屆全國人民代表大會
- Simplified Chinese: 第十一届全国人民代表大会
Transcriptions
Standard Mandarin
- Hanyu Pinyin: Dìshíyī Jiè Quánguó Rénmín Dàibiǎo Dàhuì

Abbreviation
- Traditional Chinese: 第十一屆全國人大
- Simplified Chinese: 第十一届全国人大
Transcriptions
Standard Mandarin
- Hanyu Pinyin: Dìshíyī Jiè Quánguó Réndà

The 11th National People's Congress (NPC) met for a 5-year term, from 2008 to 2013. It held five annual two week plenary sessions during this period. It succeeded the 10th National People's Congress. There were 2,987 deputies elected to the 11th Congress in 2008,

== Seat distribution ==
Major party	General Secretary	Seats
Chinese Communist Party	Hu Jintao	2,099
Other Parties	Chairperson	Seats
Chinese Peasants' and Workers' Democratic Party	Sang Guowei	888
Jiusan Society	Han Qide	888
China Democratic League	Jiang Shusheng	888
China Association for Promoting Democracy	Yan Junqi	888
China National Democratic Construction Association	Chen Changzhi	888
Revolutionary Committee of the Chinese Kuomintang	Zhou Tienong	888
Taiwan Democratic Self-Government League	Lin Wenyi	888
China Zhi Gong Party	Wan Gang	888
Independents	N/A	888

== Organization ==
=== Council of Chairpersons ===
		Party	Term
Chairman	Wu Bangguo	CCP	15 Mar. 2008 – 14 Mar. 2013
Vice Chairpersons	Wang Zhaoguo	CCP	15 Mar. 2008 – 14 Mar. 2013
Vice Chairpersons	Lu Yongxiang	CCP	15 Mar. 2008 – 14 Mar. 2013
Vice Chairpersons	Uyunqimg	CCP	15 Mar. 2008 – 14 Mar. 2013
Vice Chairpersons	Han Qide	CAPD	15 Mar. 2008 – 14 Mar. 2013
Vice Chairpersons	Hua Jianmin	CCP	15 Mar. 2008 – 14 Mar. 2013
Vice Chairpersons	Chen Zhili	CCP	15 Mar. 2008 – 14 Mar. 2013
Vice Chairpersons	Zhou Tienong	RCCK	15 Mar. 2008 – 14 Mar. 2013
Vice Chairpersons	Li Jianguo	CCP	15 Mar. 2008 – 14 Mar. 2013
Vice Chairpersons	Ismail Tiliwaldi	CCP	15 Mar. 2008 – 14 Mar. 2013
Vice Chairpersons	Jiang Shusheng	CDL	15 Mar. 2008 – 14 Mar. 2013
Vice Chairpersons	Chen Changzhi	RCCK	15 Mar. 2008 – 14 Mar. 2013
Vice Chairpersons	Zhang Baowen	CNDCA	15 Mar. 2008 – 14 Mar. 2013
Vice Chairpersons	Yan Junqi	CAPD	15 Mar. 2008 – 14 Mar. 2013
Vice Chairpersons	Sang Guowei	CPWDP	15 Mar. 2008 – 14 Mar. 2013
Secretary-General	Li Jianguo	CCP	15 Mar. 2008 – 14 Mar. 2013

=== Special Committees ===
Special committee	Chairperson
Ethnic Affairs Committee	Ma Qizhi
Law Committee	Hu Kangsheng
Internal and Judicial Affairs Committee	Huang Zhendong
Financial and Economic Affairs Committee	Shi Xiushi
Education, Science, Culture and Public Health Committee	Bai Keming
Foreign Affairs Committee	Li Zhaoxing
Overseas Chinese Affairs Committee	Gao Siren
Environment Protection and Resources Conservation Committee	Wang Guangtao
Agriculture and Rural Affairs Committee	Wang Yunlong

== The first session ==
The first session of the 11th Congress sat from March 5 to March 18, 2008. It re-elected Hu Jintao as president and Wen Jiabao as Premier. Xi Jinping was elected vice-president. The State Council, China's cabinet, went through major restructuring.

NPCSC Chairman Election				NPCSC Secretary-general Election			
Candidates	For	Against	Abstain	Candidates	For	Against	Abstain
Wu Bangguo	2,948	9	9	Li Jianguo	2,932	25	8
Presidential Election				Vice-Presidential Election			
Candidates	For	Against	Abstain	Candidates	For	Against	Abstain
Hu Jintao	2,956	3	5	Xi Jinping	2,919	28	17
CMC Chairmanship Election				Premiership Nomination			
Candidates	For	Against	Abstain	Candidates	For	Against	Abstain
Hu Jintao	2,959	4	4	Wen Jiabao	2,926	21	12
Supreme Court President Election				Procurator-general Election			
Candidates	For	Against	Abstain	Candidates	For	Against	Abstain
Wang Shengjun	2,885	36	44	Cao Jianming	2,933	16	17

- All state leaders were elected from one name ballots.

== The second session ==
The second session of the 11th Congress sat from March 5 to March 13, 2009. This congress dealt with issues such as the 2008 financial crisis, attempted to introduce a new social welfare system, as well as checks and balances on public officials.

== The third session ==
The third session of the 11th Congress sat from March 5 to March 14, 2010.

== The fourth session ==
The fourth session of the 11th Congress sat from March 5 to March 14, 2011.

== The fifth session ==
The fifth and final session of the 11th Congress sat from March 5 to March 14, 2012.

== See also ==
- List of members of the 11th National People's Congress
