= 14th National People's Congress =

Chinese legislative session since 2023

14th National People's Congress 第十四届全国人民代表大会
- National emblem of China

5 March 2023 (3 years, 260 days) – Overview
- Type: Supreme organ of state power
- Election: Indirect elections

Leadership
- Chairman: Zhao Leji
- Vice Chairmen: Li Hongzhong, Wang Dongming, Xiao Jie, Zheng Jianbang, Ding Zhongli, Hao Mingjin, Cai Dafeng, He Wei, Wu Weihua, Tie Ning, Peng Qinghua, Zhang Qingwei, Losang Jamcan, and Shohrat Zakir
- Secretary-General: Liu Qi
- Standing Committee: 175 (14th)

Members
- Total: 2977 members
- Newcomers: 2187 members (14th)
- Old: 790 members (13th)

14th National People's Congress
- Simplified Chinese: 第十四届全国人民代表大会
- Traditional Chinese: 第十四屆全國人民代表大會
Transcriptions
Standard Mandarin
- Hanyu Pinyin: Dì Shísìjiè Quánguó Rénmín Dàibiǎo Dàhuì

Abbreviation
- Simplified Chinese: 第十四届全国人大
- Traditional Chinese: 第十四屆全國人大
Transcriptions
Standard Mandarin
- Hanyu Pinyin: Dì Shísìjiè Quánguó Réndà

The 14th National People's Congress (NPC) is the current term of the supreme organ of state power of the People's Republic of China. This term of the National People's Congress convened in Beijing, on 5 March 2023, and is scheduled to continue until March 2028. Elections for the new Congress were held from October 2022 to February 2023. It is scheduled to hold five sessions in this period, occurring around early March every year until before 2028.

== Seat distribution ==
Major party	General Secretary	Seats
Chinese Communist Party	Xi Jinping	?
Other Parties	Chairperson	Seats
Chinese Peasants' and Workers' Democratic Party	He Wei	60
Jiusan Society	Wu Weihua	56
China Democratic League	Ding Zhongli	56
China Association for Promoting Democracy	Cai Dafeng	54
China National Democratic Construction Association	Hao Mingjin	44
Revolutionary Committee of the Chinese Kuomintang	Zheng Jianbang	41
China Zhi Gong Party	Jiang Zuojun	39
Taiwan Democratic Self-Government League	Su Hui	14
Independents	N/A	?

=== Standing Committee ===
Major party	Seats
Chinese Communist Party	107
Other Parties	Seats
China Democratic League	9
China Association for Promoting Democracy	7
Revolutionary Committee of the Chinese Kuomintang	6
Jiusan Society	5
Chinese Peasants' and Workers' Democratic Party	5
China National Democratic Construction Association	4
Taiwan Democratic Self-Government League	4
China Zhi Gong Party	3
Independents	13

== Organization ==
=== Council of Chairpersons ===
		Party	Term
Chairman	Zhao Leji	CCP	10 Mar. 2023 – present
Vice Chairpersons	Li Hongzhong	CCP	10 Mar. 2023 – present
Vice Chairpersons	Wang Dongming	CCP	10 Mar. 2023 – present
Vice Chairpersons	Xiao Jie	CCP	10 Mar. 2023 – present
Vice Chairpersons	Zheng Jianbang	RCCK	10 Mar. 2023 – present
Vice Chairpersons	Ding Zhongli	CDL	10 Mar. 2023 – present
Vice Chairpersons	Hao Mingjin	CNDCA	10 Mar. 2023 – present
Vice Chairpersons	Cai Dafeng	CAPD	10 Mar. 2023 – present
Vice Chairpersons	He Wei	CPWDP	10 Mar. 2023 – present
Vice Chairpersons	Wu Weihua	JS	10 Mar. 2023 – present
Vice Chairpersons	Tie Ning	CCP	10 Mar. 2023 – present
Vice Chairpersons	Peng Qinghua	CCP	10 Mar. 2023 – present
Vice Chairpersons	Zhang Qingwei	CCP	10 Mar. 2023 – present
Vice Chairpersons	Losang Jamcan	CCP	10 Mar. 2023 – present
Vice Chairpersons	Shohrat Zakir	CCP	10 Mar. 2023 – present
Secretary-General	Liu Qi	CCP	10 Mar. 2023 – present

=== Special Committees ===
Special committee	Chairperson
Ethnic Affairs Committee	Bayanqolu
Constitution and Law Committee	Xin Chunying
Supervisory and Judicial Affairs Committee	Yang Xiaochao
Financial and Economic Affairs Committee	Zhong Shan
Education, Science, Culture and Public Health Committee	Luo Shugang
Foreign Affairs Committee	Lou Qinjian
Overseas Chinese Affairs Committee	Yu Weiguo
Environment Protection and Resources Conservation Committee	Lu Xinshe
Agriculture and Rural Affairs Committee	Du Jiahao
Social Development Affairs Committee	Yang Zhenwu

== The first session ==
The first session of the 14th NPC was held between 5–13 March 2023. A preparatory meeting was held on 3 March, presided by outgoing NPC Standing Committee chairman Li Zhanshu. During the session, Zhao Leji succeeded Li Zhanshu as the NPCSC chairman, while Xi Jinping was granted an unprecedented third term as president. Han Zheng succeeded Wang Qishan as vice president, while Li Qiang was appointed as the premier succeeding Li Keqiang.

=== Election results ===
NPCSC Chairman Election				NPCSC Secretary-general Election			
Candidates	For	Against	Abstain	Candidates	For	Against	Abstain
Zhao Leji	2952	0	0	Liu Qi	2952	0	0
Presidential Election				Vice-Presidential Election			
Candidates	For	Against	Abstain	Candidates	For	Against	Abstain
Xi Jinping	2952	0	0	Han Zheng	2952	0	0
NPCSC Vice-chairmen Election				NSC Director Election			
Candidates	For	Against	Abstain	Candidates	For	Against	Abstain
Li Hongzhong	2950	1	1	Liu Jinguo	2943	3	1
Wang Dongming	2952	0	0	Liu Jinguo	2943	3	1
Xiao Jie	2952	0	0	Liu Jinguo	2943	3	1
Zheng Jianbang	2952	0	0	Liu Jinguo	2943	3	1
Ding Zhongli	2952	0	0	Liu Jinguo	2943	3	1
Hao Mingjin	2952	0	0	Liu Jinguo	2943	3	1
Cai Dafeng	2952	0	0	Liu Jinguo	2943	3	1
He Wei	2952	0	0	Liu Yuan	1	0	0
Wu Weihua	2952	0	0	Liu Yuan	1	0	0
Tie Ning	2952	0	0	Liu Yuan	1	0	0
Peng Qinghua	2952	0	0	Liu Yuan	1	0	0
Zhang Qingwei	2952	0	0	Liu Yuan	1	0	0
Losang Jamcan	2952	0	0	Liu Yuan	1	0	0
Shohrat Zakir	2952	0	0	Liu Yuan	1	0	0
Premierial Nomination				Vice-Premierial Nomination			
Li Qiang	2936	3	8	Ding Xuexiang	2944	0	2
Li Qiang	2936	3	8	He Lifeng	2943	3	0
Li Qiang	2936	3	8	Zhang Guoqing	2946	0	0
Li Qiang	2936	3	8	Liu Guozhong	2946	0	0
CMC Chairmanship Election				CMC Vice-Chairmanship Election			
Candidates	For	Against	Abstain	Candidates	For	Against	Abstain
Xi Jinping	2952	0	0	Zhang Youxia	2944	1	2
Xi Jinping	2952	0	0	He Weidong	2947	0	0
Supreme Court President Election				Procurator-general Election			
Candidates	For	Against	Abstain	Candidates	For	Against	Abstain
Zhang Jun	2947	1	3	Ying Yong	2947	3	7

== The second session ==
The second session of the 14th National People's Congress of the People's Republic of China (PRC) was held from 5 March to 11 March 2024, concurrently with the Chinese People's Political Consultative Conference (CPPCC) as part of the annual Two Sessions. The 14th National People's Congress was held at the Great Hall of the People in Beijing.

== The third session ==
The third session of the NPC was held between 5 March 2025 and 11 March 2025. Premier Li Qiang announced a 5% GDP growth target and the highest fiscal deficit in 30 years to mitigate the effects of the tariffs imposed by the Trump administration. NPCSC Chairman Zhao Leji missed the end of the NPC session, but was spotted in public again despite concerns about his whereabouts.

Preceded by 13th NPC	National People's Congress of the People's Republic of China; 2023 - 2028	Succeeded by Incumbent
