= Xin Chunying =

Chinese legal scholar and politician

Xin Chunyin
- 信春鹰
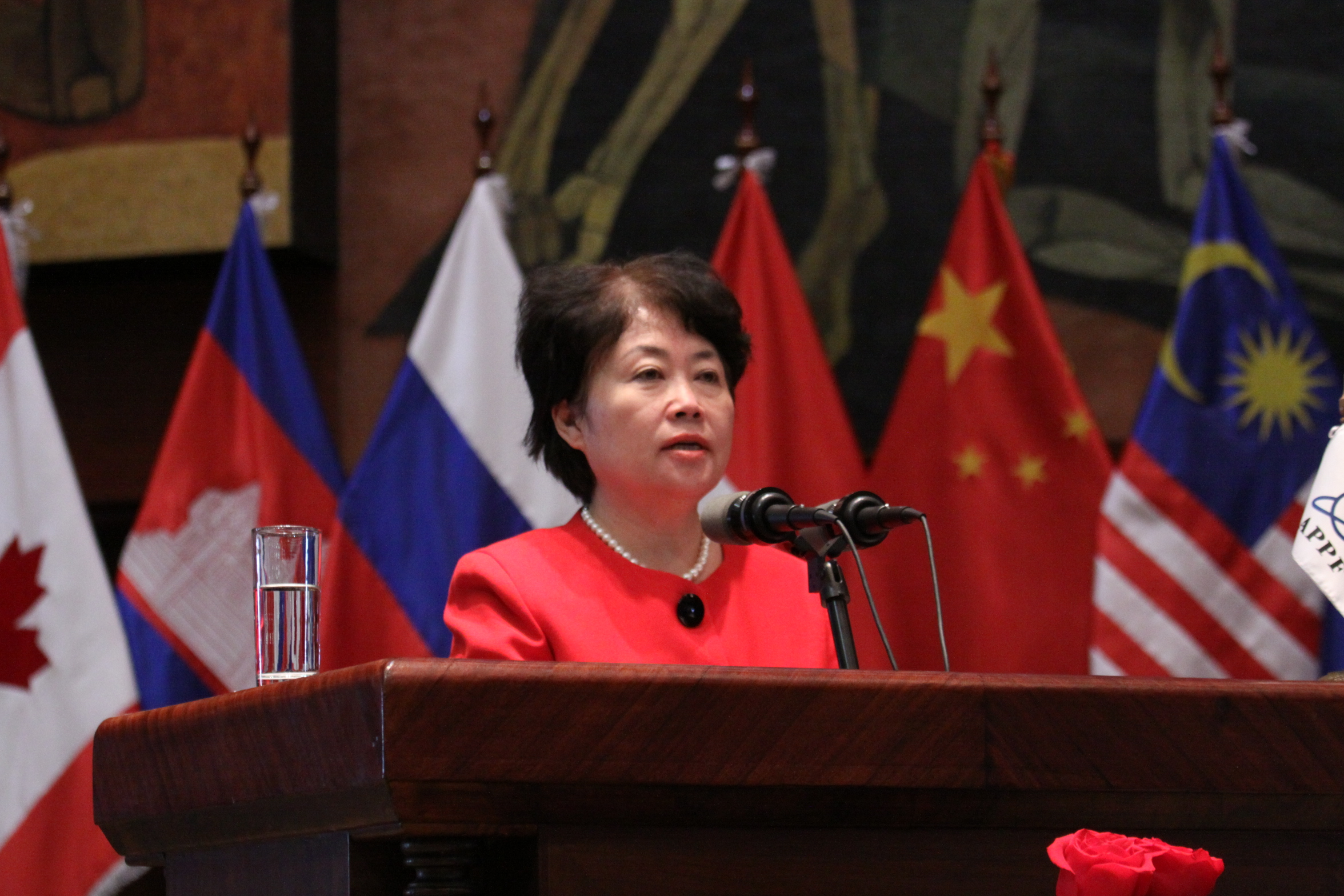

Chairperson of the Constitution and Law Committee of the National People’s Congress
- Incumbent
- Assumed office March 2023
- Chairman: Zhao Leji
- Preceded by: Li Fei

Member of the 19th Central Committee of the Chinese Communist Party

Personal details
- Born: 13 October 1956 (age 69) Tongliao, Inner Mongolia Autonomous Region
- Party: Chinese Communist Party
- Education: Jilin University; Chinese Academy of Social Science

Xin Chunyin (Chinese: 信春鹰; pinyin: Xìn Chūnyīng; born 13 October 1956) is a Chinese legal scholar and politician who serves as a committee member on in the National Congress of the Chinese Communist Party. She is also the vice-chairperson of Legislative Affairs Commission of China's National People's Congress.

== Career ==
Xin was born in 1956 in Tongliao, Inner Mongolia Autonomous Region. After graduating with a degree in law from Jilin University in 1978 she continued her studies, obtaining a Master's in Law in 1981 from the Chinese Academy of Social Science. Three years later she traveled to the United States as a visiting scholar of UC Berkeley School of Law where she discovered how Chinese politics was being perceived. Finishing her studies overseas in 1986 she returned to China and worked as a scholar at a number of national-level law institutions.

== Political career ==
In March 2003 Xin was elected as a member of the National People's Congress Law Committee, a special committee whose job is to process national legislation and legislative plans of the nation. In that same year she also became a member of the 10th NPC Standing Committee and the vice-chairman of the 10th Legislative Affairs Committee.

Since 2008, Xin has withdrawn from many of her committee roles and is now Deputy Secretary-General of NPC Standing Committee.

During the 14th National People's Congress, she was appointed chairperson of the Constitution and Law Committee.
