= Wang Chen (politician) =

Chinese journalist and politician (born 1948)

- 王晨
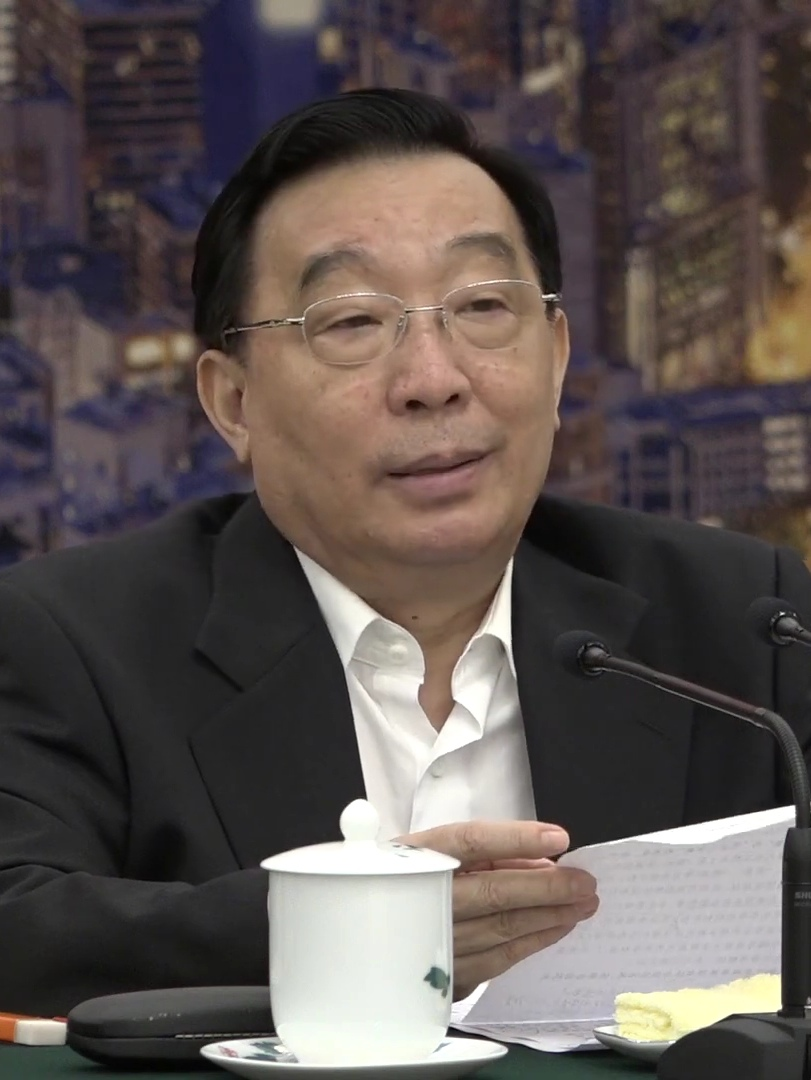
- Wang Chen in 2020

Vice Chairman of the Standing Committee of the National People's Congress
- In office 14 March 2013 – 10 March 2023
- Chairman: Zhang Dejiang; Li Zhanshu

Secretary-General of the Standing Committee of the National People's Congress
- In office 14 March 2013 – 17 March 2018
- Preceded by: Li Jianguo
- Succeeded by: Yang Zhenwu

Director of the State Council Information Office
- In office 30 March 2008 – 26 April 2013
- Preceded by: Cai Wu
- Succeeded by: Cai Mingzhao

Personal details
- Born: 2 December 1948 (age 77) Beijing, People's Republic of China
- Party: Chinese Communist Party (1975–present)
- Education: Graduate School of Chinese Academy of Social Sciences

Wang Chen (Chinese: 王晨; pinyin: Wáng Chén; born 2 December 1948) is a Chinese journalist and politician who served as a vice chairman of the Standing Committee of the National People's Congress from 2013 to 2023, and a member of the Politburo of the Chinese Communist Party from 2017 to 2022.

He served as Director of State Council Information Office from 2008 to 2013 and as the Secretary-General of the 12th National People's Congress Standing Committee from 2013 to 2018.

== Early life and education ==
Wang was born in Beijing in December 1948. He jointed the Chinese Communist Party (CCP) in 1969. Wang received an undergraduate education in Chinese literature. Between 1969 and 1971, he was a "sent-down youth" at an agricultural commune in Yijun County, Yan'an, Shaanxi. From 1971 to 1973, he worked as a clerk at the Publicity Department and the County Office of Yijun County. In 1974, he joined the Guangming Daily as a reporter on domestic affairs, working there until 1979. In that year, he enrolled in the Department of Journalism at the Chinese Academy of Social Science, graduating with a master's degree in journalism in 1982.

== Career ==
He returned to Guangming Daily after his graduation, where he was a reporter on political and economic affairs and deputy director of the Mass Media Department, later becoming a director in 1984. He also became the director of the Office of the Editor-in-Chief in 1984, later becoming the deputy editor-in-chief in 1986, and finally the editor-in-chief in 1995.

In June 2000 he was appointed as deputy director of CCP Publicity Department. In August 2001, he became the editor-in-chief of People's Daily. In October of same year, he became the vice chairman of China National Journalist Association. He was promoted to president of People's Daily Agency. In March 2003, he became the chairman of Chinese Newspapers Association. In 2006, he attended a short program at the Central Party School. From 2008 to 2013, he served as Director of the Information Office of the State Council. He was appointed the director of the newly created State Internet Information Office under the Information Office in May 2011.

On 14 March 2013, he became the secretary-general of the Standing Committee of the National People's Congress and a vice-chairman of the NPCSC.

In October 2017, after the 19th Party Congress, Wang became a member of the CCP Politburo. He became the first-ranking vice chairman of the NPCSC in March 2018.

He was a member of the 16th, 17th and 18th CCP Central Committees, and a member of the 9th National Committee of the Chinese People's Political Consultative Conference (CPPCC).

=== U.S. sanctions ===
On December 7, 2020, the U.S. Department of the Treasury imposed sanctions on the entire body of 14 Vice Chairpersons of the National People's Congress of China, including Wang Chen, for "undermining Hong Kong's autonomy and restricting the freedom of expression or assembly."

Despite these sanctions, the American Chamber of Commerce in China hosted Wang at its annual appreciation dinner on December 10, 2020, which stirred controversy and criticism in the U.S.

Assembly seats
| Preceded by Li Jianguo | Secretary-General of the Standing Committee of the National People's Congress; 2013–2018 | Succeeded by Yang Zhenwu |
