= Shao Zengming =

Chinese businessman

- Born: Shao Zengming
- Known for: Founder and chairman of Henan Liliang Diamond

Shao Zengming (Chinese: 邵增明; pinyin: Shào Zēngmíng) is a Chinese businessman and billionaire who founded synthetic diamond manufacturer Henan Liliang Diamond.

Forbes lists his net worth as of April 2022 at $1.1 billion USD.
