= Jiang Shusheng =

Chinese physicist and politician

- 蒋树声

Vice Chairman of the Standing Committee of the National People's Congress
- In office 15 March 2008 – 14 March 2013
- Chairman: Wu Bangguo

Chairman of the China Democratic League
- In office December 2005 – December 2012
- Preceded by: Ding Shisun
- Succeeded by: Zhang Baowen

Personal details
- Born: April 1940 (age 86) Wuxi, Jiangsu
- Party: China Democratic League
- Education: Nanjing University

Jiang Shusheng (simplified Chinese: 蒋树声; traditional Chinese: 蔣樹聲; pinyin: Jiǎng Shùshēng; born April 1940 in Wuxi, Jiangsu) is a Chinese physicist and politician. He served as President of Nanjing University from 1997 to 2006. He was, from 2005 to 2012, chairman of the China Democratic League, one of eight legally recognized political parties led by the Chinese Communist Party. He served as the Vice Chairman of the Standing Committee of the National People's Congress from 2008 to 2013.
