= Bai Zhijian =

Chinese politician

- 白志健

Chairman of the National People's Congress Overseas Chinese Affairs Committee
- Incumbent
- Assumed office 2014

Director of the Macau Liaison Office
- In office October 2001 – January 2014
- Preceded by: Wang Qiren
- Succeeded by: Li Gang

Personal details
- Born: November 1948 (age 77) Wuhan, Hubei
- Party: Chinese Communist Party
- Education: Xiamen Aquatic Product Institute

Bai Zhijian (Chinese: 白志健; November 1948) is the current chairman of the National People's Congress Overseas Chinese Affairs Committee, and former director of the Liaison Office of the Central People's Government in the Macau Special Administrative Region. He served as head of that office from July 2002 to January 2014. He joined the Chinese Communist Party in 1976. He has served as a member of the 16th and 17th Central Committees of the Chinese Communist Party.
