= Li Jingtian =

Chinese politician

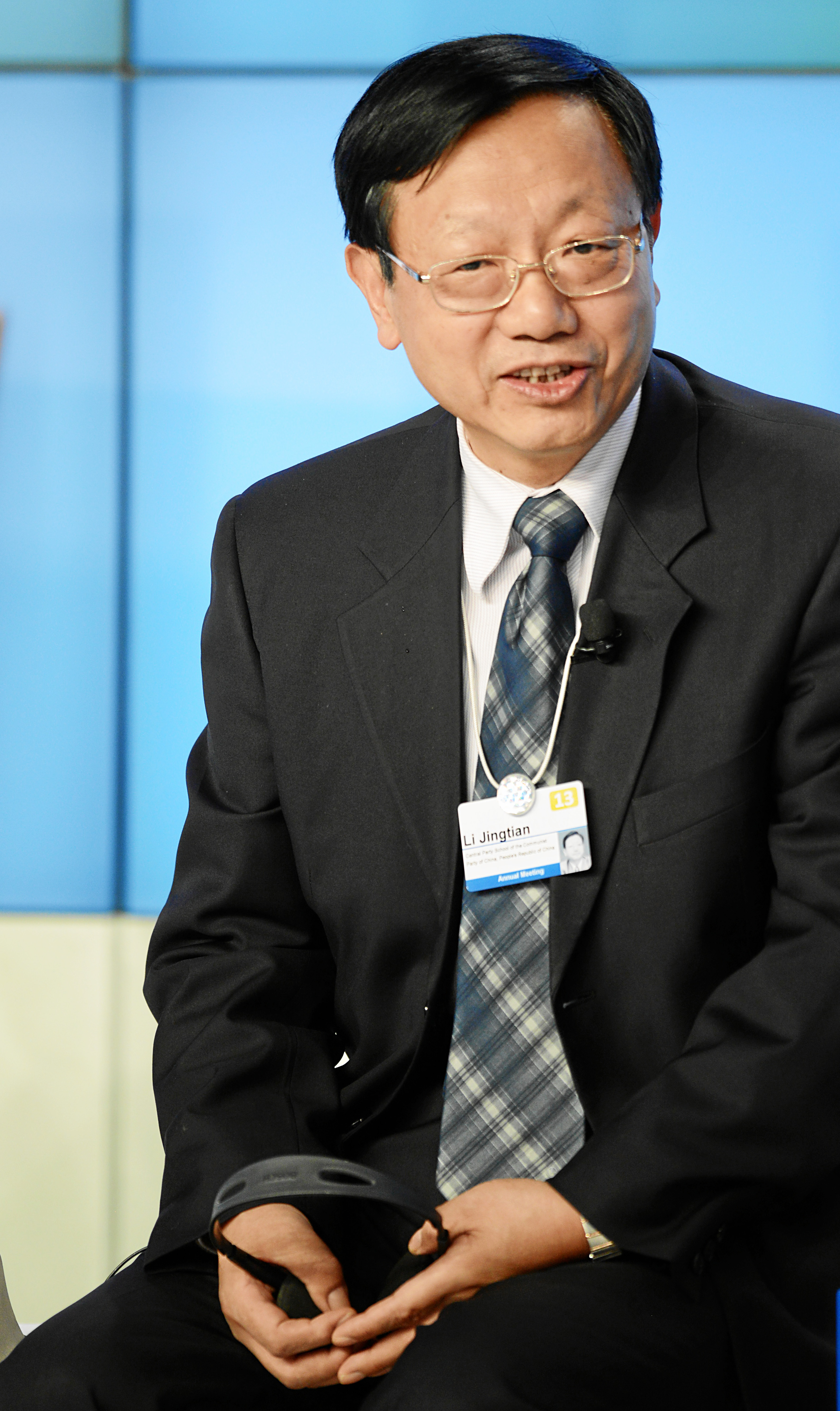
Li at the World Economic Forum Annual Meeting in 2013

Li Jingtian (Chinese: 李景田; born January 1948) is a Chinese retired politician of Manchu heritage. Between 2007 and 2013, he served as the executive vice president of the Central Party School of the Chinese Communist Party. He served as Chairpersons of the Ethnic Affairs Committee of the National People's Congress.

== Biography ==
Born in Jalaid Banner, Inner Mongolia, Li joined the Chinese Communist Party (CCP) in February, 1971. From 1968, he served in Nenjiang County of Heilongjiang Province and was the secretary of the Communist Youth League Nengjiang committee. In 1976, Li was elevated to vice secretary and later, secretary of CYL Heihe committee. He entered the Central Organization Department of the CCP in 1978, and in 1995, he was promoted to director of organization bureau of the Department. In 1998, Li was transferred to Shanxi Province and became a standing committee member and director of organization department of CCP Shanxi committee. He was later promoted to vice Party chief of Shanxi. In 2001, Li was transferred back to the Central Organization Department and served as vice director. In 2005, he became the director of research office of party history of the CCP. By the end of 2007, Li was appointed as the executive vice president of CCP Central Party School (rank equivalent of minister). He left the post in 2013.

Li was an alternate of the 16th and 17th Central Committee of the Chinese Communist Party.

Party political offices
Preceded by Su Rong	Executive Vice President of the Central Party School; 2007 – 2013	Succeeded by He Yiting
