= Yang Zhenwu =

Chinese politician

- 杨振武
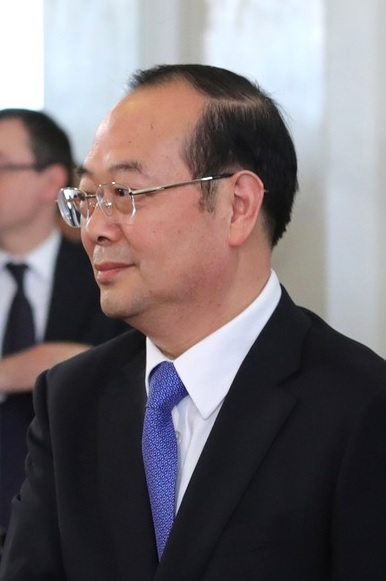
- Yang in July 2017

Secretary-General of the Standing Committee of the National People's Congress
- In office 17 March 2018 – 10 March 2023
- Chairman: Li Zhanshu
- Preceded by: Wang Chen
- Succeeded by: Liu Qi

President of the People's Daily
- In office 30 April 2014 – 2018
- Preceded by: Zhang Yannong
- Succeeded by: Li Baoshan

Editor-in-Chief of the People's Daily
- In office 27 April 2013 – 2014
- Preceded by: Cai Mingzhao
- Succeeded by: Li Baoshan

Head of the Propaganda Department of the CCP Shanghai Municipal Committee
- In office 2009–2013
- Party Secretary: Yu Zhengsheng; Han Zheng
- Preceded by: Wang Zhongwei
- Succeeded by: Xu Lin

Personal details
- Born: May 1956 (age 70) Xinle County, Hebei, China
- Party: Chinese Communist Party
- Education: Nankai University; Central Party School of the Chinese Communist Party

Chinese name
- Simplified Chinese: 杨振武
- Traditional Chinese: 楊振武
Transcriptions
Standard Mandarin
- Hanyu Pinyin: Yáng Zhènwǔ

Yang Zhenwu (Note: Chinese: 杨振武; pinyin: Yáng Zhènwǔ) (born May 1956) is a Chinese politician who served as president of the People's Daily from 2014 to 2018. He joined the Chinese Communist Party (CCP) in April 1975, and entered the workforce in September 1978. He is a member of the 19th Central Committee of the Chinese Communist Party. He was a representative of the 17th and 18th National Congress of the Chinese Communist Party.

== Biography ==
Yang was born in Xinle County, Hebei, in May 1956. In 1976, he entered Nankai University, majoring in Chinese language and literature.

After graduating in 1978, he was dispatched to the People's Daily, where he was promoted to editor-in-chief in 2013 and to president in 2014. He also served as head of the Propaganda Department of the CCP Shanghai Municipal Committee and member of the Standing Committee of the CCP Shanghai Municipal Committee between 2009 and 2013. Yang replaced Wang Zhongwei in the propaganda department after reports in the media of collapsed residential buildings and police sting operations, leading to public criticism of the Shanghai government.

In 2018, he took office as secretary-general of the Standing Committee of the 13th National People's Congress. In the 14th National People's Congress, he became chairperson of the Social Development Affairs Committee.

== Notes ==
Party political offices
Preceded by Wang Zhongwei	Head of the Propaganda Department of the CCP Shanghai Municipal Committee; 2009–2013	Succeeded by Xu Lin
Government offices
Preceded by Zhang Yannong	Editor-in-Chief of the People's Daily; 2013–2014	Succeeded by Li Baoshan
Preceded by Cai Mingzhao	President of the People's Daily; 2014–2018	Succeeded by Li Baoshan
Assembly seats
Preceded by Wang Chen	Secretary-General of the Standing Committee of the 13th National People's Congress; 2018–2023	Succeeded by Liu Qi
