= Zhang Baowen =

Chinese politician

- 张宝文
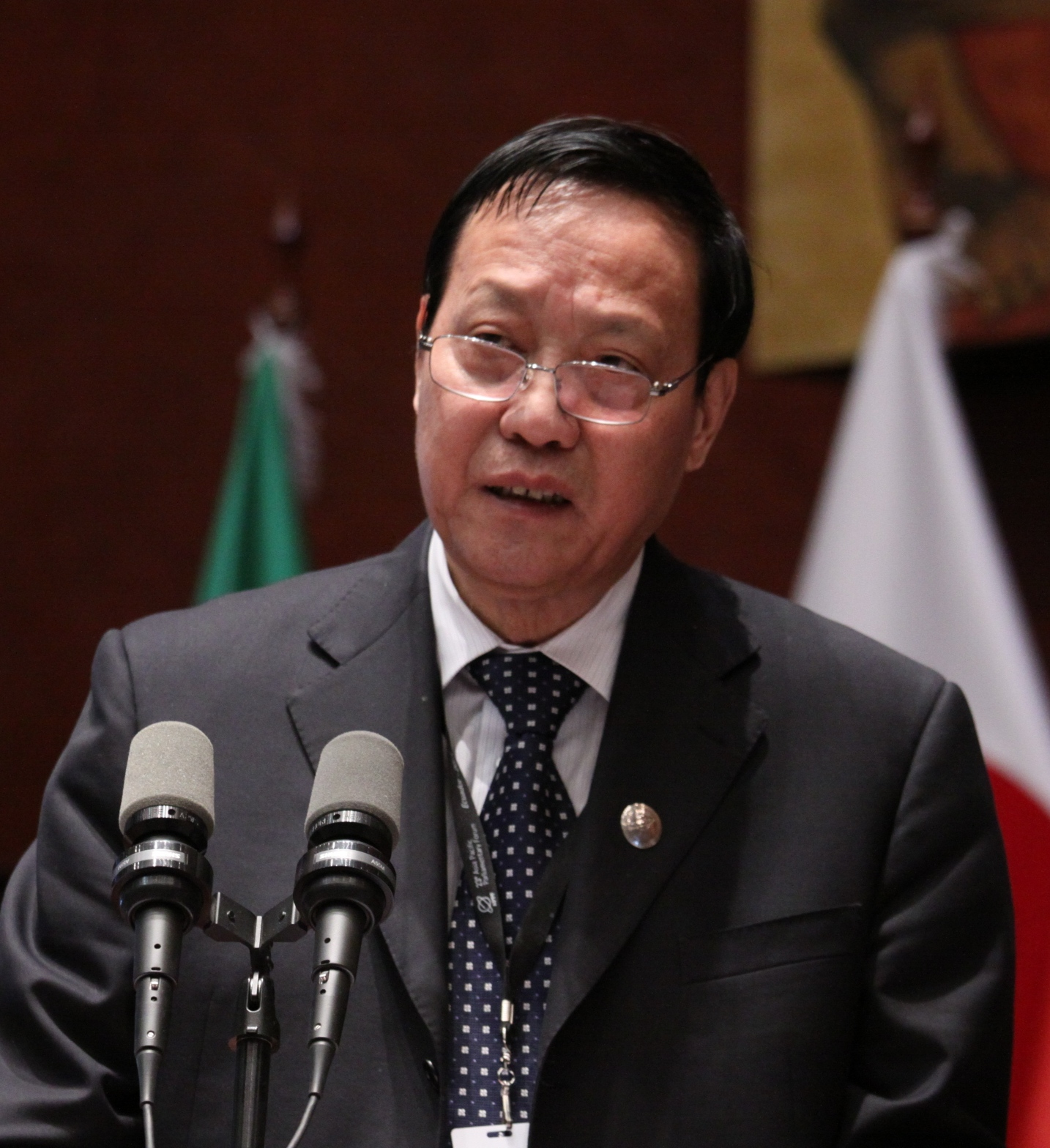

Vice Chairman of the Standing Committee of the National People's Congress
- In office 14 March 2013 – 17 March 2018
- Chairman: Zhang Dejiang

Chairman of the China Democratic League
- In office December 2012 – 10 December 2017
- Preceded by: Jiang Shusheng
- Succeeded by: Ding Zhongli

Personal details
- Born: November 1946 (age 79) Xingping, Shaanxi
- Party: China Democratic League
- Education: Xi'an International Studies University; Northwest Agricultural University; University of Minnesota

Zhang Baowen (Chinese: 张宝文; born November, 1946) is a Chinese politician who served as a vice chairman of the Standing Committee of the National People's Congress and the chairman of the China Democratic League.
