= Sang Guowei =

Chinese pharmacologist, physician and politician (1941–2023)

Sang Guowei (Chinese: 桑国卫; pinyin: Sāng Guówèi; 11 November 1941 – 7 December 2023) was a Chinese pharmacologist, physician and politician.

He was a native of Wuxing, Zhejiang and was born in Shanghai. He graduated from Shanghai Medical College and was elected an academician of the Chinese Academy of Engineering.

He served as the chairman of the Chinese Peasants' and Workers' Democratic Party, a recognized minor political party in China, from 2007 to 2012 and was also a Vice Chairman of the Standing Committee of the National People's Congress between 2008 and 2013.

Guowei died on 7 December 2023, at the age of 82 from COVID-19 in Beijing during the COVID-19 pandemic in China.
