= He Yiting =

Chinese politician (born 1952)

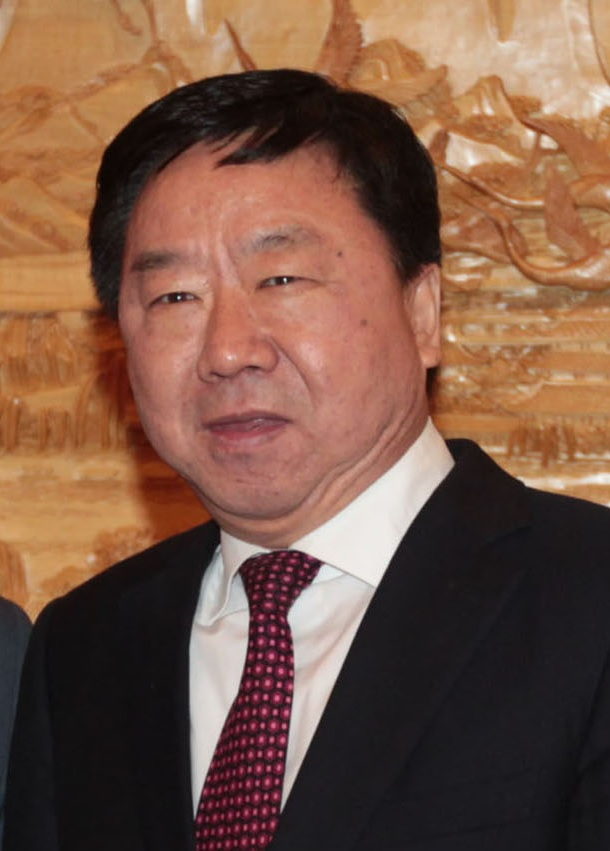
He Yiting

He Yiting (Chinese: 何毅亭; born 1952) is a Chinese ideologist and politician. Since 2013, He has served as the executive vice president of the Central Party School (rank equivalent of minister), the top ideological indoctrination institution of the Chinese Communist Party (CCP).

== Career ==
Born in Hanzhong, Shaanxi province, in 1952, He was a sent-down youth during the Cultural Revolution and later worked as a factory worker. After the resumption of the National College Entrance Exams, He was admitted to Beijing Normal University. In 1985 He earned a bachelor's, then a master's degree in history. In 1986 he began working in an administrative position for the General Office of the CCP. By 1989, he became a leader on the party-building focus group of the Central Policy Research Office.

In June 2000, He was named deputy chief of the Policy Research Office, a role in which he served until 2013. He has served on two Central Leading Groups, including the Leading Group on Educating Party Members on Modern Demands, and the Leading Group for the Pilot Programs of the Deepening the Study of the Scientific Development Concept. In September 2013, he was named executive vice president of the CCP Central Party School, presiding over day-to-day operations of the institution.

He is a member of the 18th Central Committee of the CCP. He was a delegate to the 17th and 18th National Congresses of the CCP.

== Views ==
On June 15, 2020, on the birthday of CCP General Secretary Xi Jinping, He published an article saying that Xi Jinping Thought on Socialism with Chinese characteristics for a New Era is the equivalent of Marxism in the 21st century. He claimed that China's development under Xi's leadership has "transcended national and geographic boundaries" with "global historical significance."

Party political offices
Preceded by Li Jingtian	Executive Vice President of the Central Party School; 2013 – present	Succeeded by Incumbent
