= Zhou Gucheng =

Chinese politician

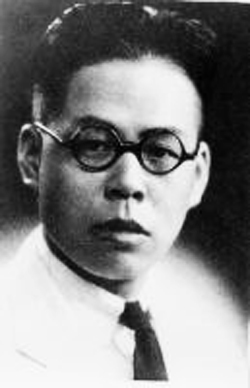
Zhou Gucheng

Zhou Gucheng (Chinese: 周谷城; September 13, 1898 – November 10, 1996) was a Chinese male politician, who served as the vice chairperson of the Standing Committee of the National People's Congress.
