= First session of the 14th National People's Congress =

Election session in China

2023 National People's Congress; 第十四届全国人民代表大会第一次会议; _{1st plenary session of the}; _{14th National People's Congress}; 5 March – 13 March
President	Premier	Congress Chairman
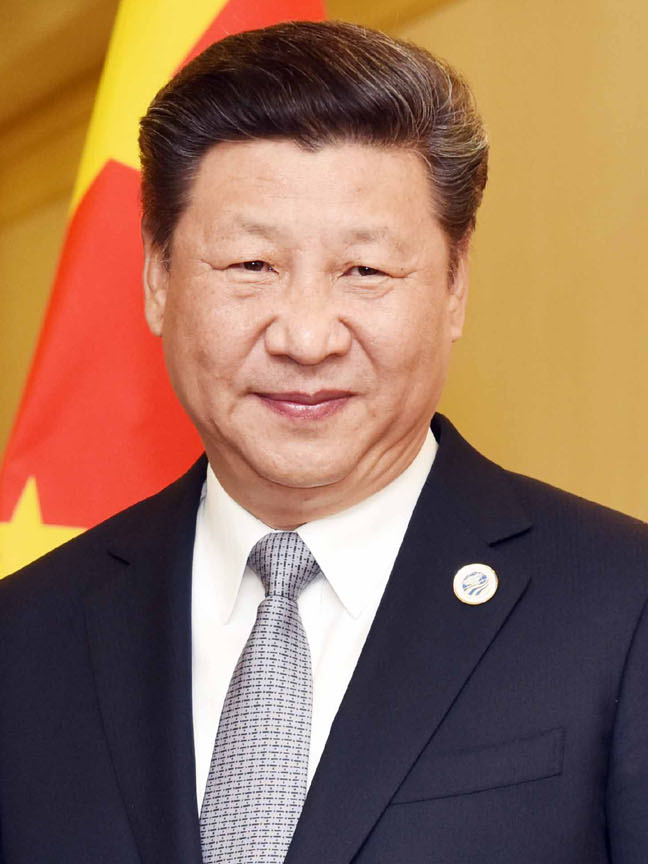
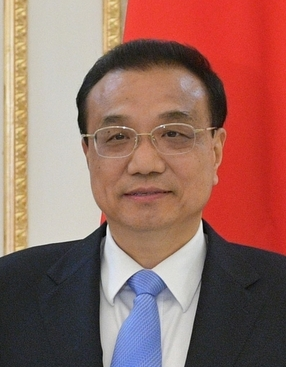
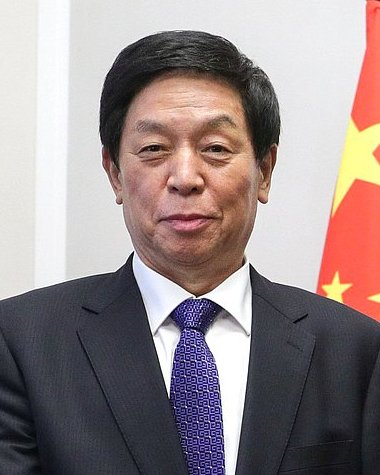
Xi Jinping	Li Keqiang	Li Zhanshu
since 17 March 2018	since 18 March 2018	since 17 March 2018
President-elect	Premier-elect	Congress Chairman-elect
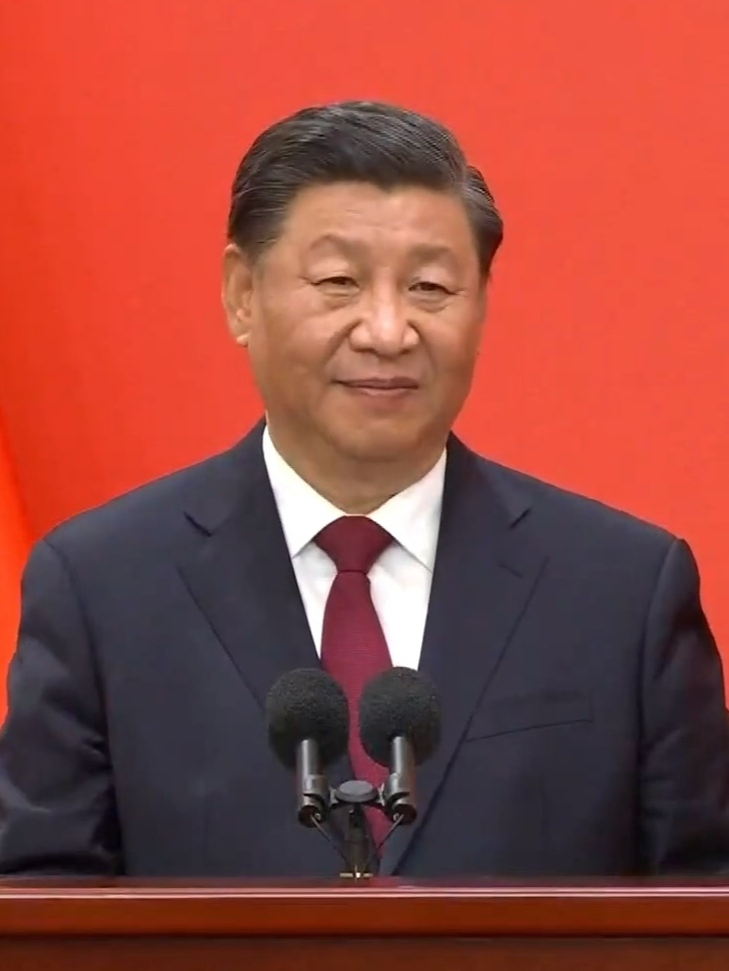
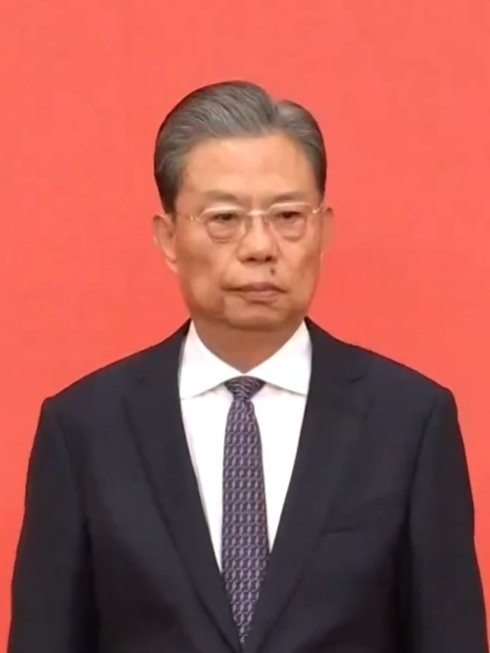
Xi Jinping	Li Qiang	Zhao Leji
since 10 March 2023	since 11 March 2023	since 10 March 2023

The first session of the 14th National People's Congress (Chinese: 第十四届全国人民代表大会第一次会议) was held in March 2023 at the Great Hall of the People in Beijing, China. The session opened on 5 March and concluded on 13 March. Major state positions of China were elected in this session.

== Preparation ==
On 30 December 2022, the Standing Committee of the 13th National People's Congress announced that the 14th NPC would open its first session on 5 March.

On 4 March 2023, the Council of Chairpersons of the Standing Committee of the 13th NPC held its 136th meeting. The meeting submitted the draft list of the presidium and secretary-general of the upcoming NPC session, along with its the draft agenda. The same day, the preparatory meeting of the first session of the 14th NPC was held, presided by NPC Standing Committee chairman Li Zhanshu. The meeting elected the presidium and secretary-general, and adopted the submitted agenda. Zhao Leji was elected as the chairman of the presidium.

== The session ==
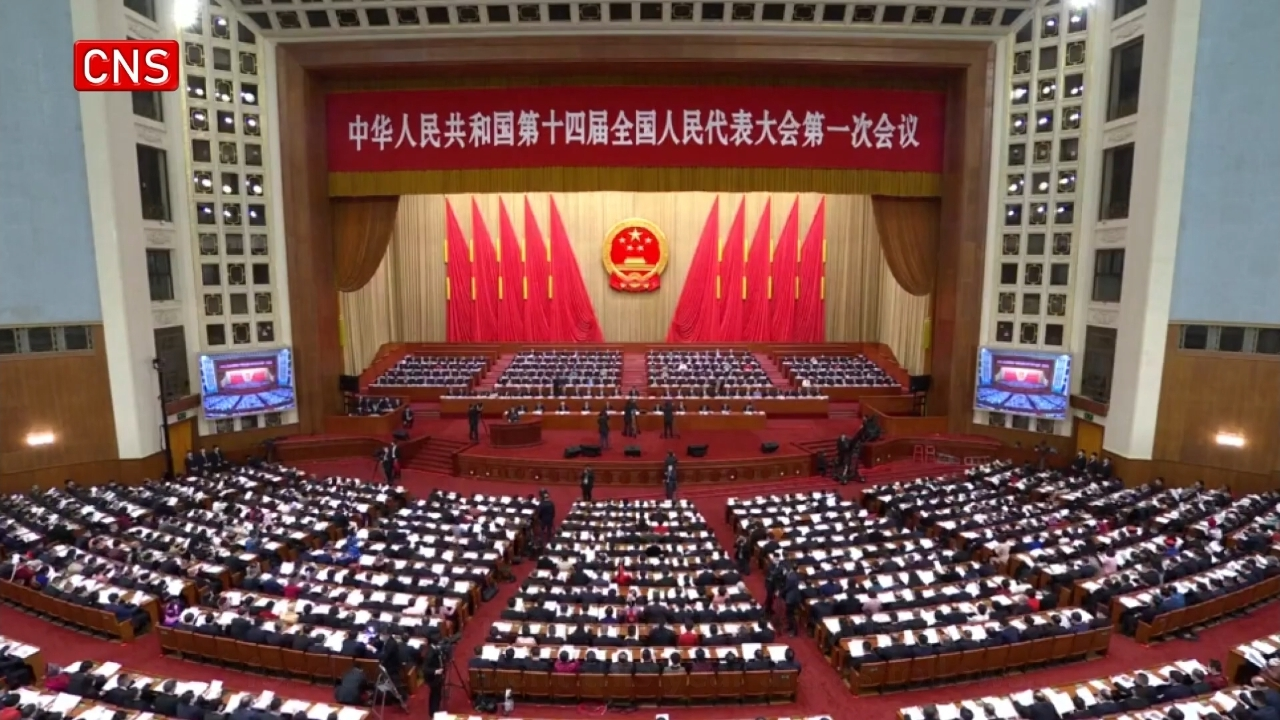
The session on 5 March

The first session opened on 5 March, presided by Presidium Chairman Zhao Leji. Premier Li Keqiang gave a work report during the meeting. Delegates voted to appoint the chairperson, vice chairpersons and members of two special committees; the Constitution and Law Committee and the Financial and Economic Affairs Committee.

On 7 March, the second plenary meeting of the first session was held. During the meeting, NPCSC chairman Li Zhanshu, Supreme People's Court president Zhou Qiang, and Procurator-General of the Supreme People's Procuratorate Zhang Jun gave work reports. State Councilor Xiao Jie gave an explanatory speech about reforming State Council institutions.

On 10 March, the third plenary meeting was held. During the meeting, the NPC voted to elect the president and vice president of the PRC, chairman of the PRC Central Military Commission, chairman of the NPCSC as well as other state leaders. During this meeting, Xi was unanimously elected for an unprecedented third term as president. The NPC also voted on the plan to reform State Council institutions. On 11 March, the fourth plenary meeting was held. The premier, vice chairpersons of the CMC, director of the National Supervisory Commission, president of the Supreme People's Court, Procurator-General of the Supreme People's Procuratorate as well as members of the NPCSC. The fifth plenary meeting, held on 12 March, elected the new State Council, including vice premiers, state councilors, secretary-general and ministers.

On 13 March, the closing meeting of the first session was held; President Xi Jinping delivered a speech.

== Voting results ==
=== State positions ===
NPCSC Chairman Election				NPCSC Secretary-general Election			
Candidates	For	Against	Abstain	Candidates	For	Against	Abstain
Zhao Leji	2952	0	0	Liu Qi	2952	0	0
Presidential Election				Vice Presidential Election			
Candidates	For	Against	Abstain	Candidates	For	Against	Abstain
Xi Jinping	2952	0	0	Han Zheng	2952	0	0
NPCSC Vice Chairperson Election				NSC Director Election			
Candidates	For	Against	Abstain	Candidates	For	Against	Abstain
Li Hongzhong	2950	1	1	Liu Jinguo	2943	3	1
Wang Dongming	2952	0	0	Liu Jinguo	2943	3	1
Xiao Jie	2952	0	0	Liu Jinguo	2943	3	1
Zheng Jianbang	2952	0	0	Liu Jinguo	2943	3	1
Ding Zhongli	2952	0	0	Liu Jinguo	2943	3	1
Hao Mingjin	2952	0	0	Liu Jinguo	2943	3	1
Cai Dafeng	2952	0	0	Liu Jinguo	2943	3	1
He Wei	2952	0	0	Liu Yuan	1	0	0
Wu Weihua	2952	0	0	Liu Yuan	1	0	0
Tie Ning	2952	0	0	Liu Yuan	1	0	0
Peng Qinghua	2952	0	0	Liu Yuan	1	0	0
Zhang Qingwei	2952	0	0	Liu Yuan	1	0	0
Losang Jamcan	2952	0	0	Liu Yuan	1	0	0
Shohrat Zakir	2952	0	0	Liu Yuan	1	0	0
Premierial Nomination				Vice Premierial Nomination			
Li Qiang	2936	3	8	Ding Xuexiang	2944	0	2
Li Qiang	2936	3	8	He Lifeng	2943	3	0
Li Qiang	2936	3	8	Zhang Guoqing	2946	0	0
Li Qiang	2936	3	8	Liu Guozhong	2946	0	0
CMC Chairmanship Election				CMC Vice Chairmanship Election			
Candidates	For	Against	Abstain	Candidates	For	Against	Abstain
Xi Jinping	2952	0	0	Zhang Youxia	2944	1	2
Xi Jinping	2952	0	0	He Weidong	2947	0	0
Supreme Court President Election				Procurator-General Election			
Candidates	For	Against	Abstain	Candidates	For	Against	Abstain
Zhang Jun	2947	1	3	Ying Yong	2947	3	7

=== Resolutions ===
Topic	For	Against	Abstain	Rate
Premier Li Keqiang's Government Work Report	2,946	0	1	99.97%
State Council Institutional Reform Plan	2,951	1	0	99.97%
Measures for Election and Decision on Appointments for the 1st Session of the 14th NPC	2,948	1	3	99.03%
Amendment to the Legislation Law	2,924	12	11	99.86%
Report on the Implementation of the 2022 National Economic and Social Development Plan and the 2023 Draft Plan	2,912	22	13	98.81%
Report on the Execution of the Central and Local Budgets for 2022 and on the Draft Central and Local Budgets for 2023	2,897	30	20	98.30%
Chairman Li Zhanshu's NPCSC Work Report	2,931	11	4	99.46%
Chief Justice Zhou Qiang's Supreme People's Court Work Report	2,874	49	24	97.73%
Procurator-General Zhang Jun's Supreme People's Procuratorate Work Report	2,880	40	27	97.52%

== Economic targets and budget ==
The following economic targets were set by the government work report submitted to the NPC:

	2023 target	Result	Ref.
GDP growth	~5%	5.2%	
CPI	~3%	0.2%	
New urban jobs	12 million	12.44 million	
Deficit-to-GDP ratio	3%		

The NPC session also adopted the following central government budget:

=== Government budget ===
In trillions of renminbi:

	Planned	% change	Actual
Central general public budget revenue	10.017	5.6	9.957
Central general public budget expenditure	13.902	4.7	14.117
Central government expenditure	3.789	6.5	3.822
Transfer to local governments	10.063	3.6	10.295
Local general public budget revenue	11.716	7.6	11.722
Local general public budget expenditure	23.674	5.2	23.635
National general public budget revenue	21.730	6.7	21.678
National general public budget expenditure	27.513	5.6	28.243

=== Central public budget expenditure ===
In billions of renminbi:

	Planned	% change	Actual
General public services	156.8	–0.7	151.6
Diplomacy	54.8	12.2	57.0
National defense	1,553.7	7.2	1,553.7
Public security	208.9	6.4	224.6
Education	155.4	2	157.1
Science and technology	328.0	2	337.1
Culture, tourism, sports and media	17.3	–0.3	17.3
Social security and employment	99.2	19	105.4
Health	22.7	2.9	29.7
Energy conservation and environmental protection	16.2	–8.6	19.6
Urban and rural communities	0.3	5.3	0.3
Agriculture, forestry and water	21.9	–12.1	25.7
Transportation	62.0	–2.4	77.3
Resource exploration and industrial information	36.9	5.2	40.4
Commercial services	3.8	11.8	3.0
Financial	40.5	–4.2	52.5
Natural resources, oceanography and meteorology	25.5	–1.6	28.6
Housing security	62.2	0.9	62.
Stockpiling grain, edible oils, and other materials	132.8	13.6	130.1
Debt interest payments	723.0	10.8	694.6
Total	3,789.0	6.5	3,821.9

=== National general public budget expenditure ===
In billions of renminbi:

	Spending	% change
Education	4,124.2	2.0
Science and technology	1,082.3	7.9
Culture, tourism, sports and media	396	1.2
Social security and employment	3,988.3	8.9
Health and medical	2,239.3	–0.6
Energy conservation and environmental protection	563.3	4.1
Urban and rural community	205.3	5.7
Agriculture, forestry and water	2,396.7	6.5
Transportation	1,220.6	1.3
Debt interest payments	1,182.9	4.2
Total	27,457.4	5.4

Preceded by 2022 NPC	Annual National People's Congress Sessions of the People's Republic of China; March 2023	Succeeded by 2024 NPC
