= National People's Congress =

Supreme organ of state power of China

National People's Congress of the People's Republic of China 中华人民共和国全国人民代表大会
- 14th National People's Congress

Type
- Type: Unicameral

History
- Founded: 15 September 1954; 72 years ago
- Preceded by: Chinese People's Political Consultative Conference

Leadership
- Chairman of the Standing Committee: Zhao Leji, CCP since 10 March 2023
- Vice Chairman of the Standing Committee: Li Hongzhong, CCP; Wang Dongming, CCP; Xiao Jie, CCP; Zheng Jianbang, RCCK; Ding Zhongli, CDL; Hao Mingjin, CNDCA; Cai Dafeng, CAPD; He Wei, CPWDP; Wu Weihua, JS; Tie Ning, CCP; Peng Qinghua, CCP; Zhang Qingwei, CCP; Losang Jamcan, CCP; Shohrat Zakir, CCP since 10 March 2023
- Secretary-General of the Standing Committee: Liu Qi, CCP since 10 March 2023

Structure
- Seats: NPC: 2847 deputies NPC Standing Committee: 162 members
- NPC political groups: Ruling Party (2478) CCP and Nonpartisan (2478) Democratic Parties (369) JS (61) CPWDP (60) CDL (55) CAPD (54) CNDCA (44) RCCK (43) CZGP (39) TDSL (13)
- NPC Standing Committee political groups: Ruling Party (107) CCP (107) Democratic Parties (55) CDL (9) CAPD (7) RCCK (6) CPWDP (5) JS (5) CNDCA (4) TDSL (3) CZGP (3) Nonpartisan (13)
- Length of term: 5 years

Elections
- NPC voting system: Indirect modified block combined approval voting
- NPC Standing Committee voting system: Indirect modified block combined approval voting
- First NPC election: Spring and summer of 1954
- First NPC Standing Committee election: September 1954
- Last NPC election: December 2022 – January 2023
- Last NPC Standing Committee election: March 2023
- Next NPC election: Late 2027 – early 2028
- Next NPC Standing Committee election: March 2028
- Redistricting: Standing Committee of the National People's Congress

Meeting place
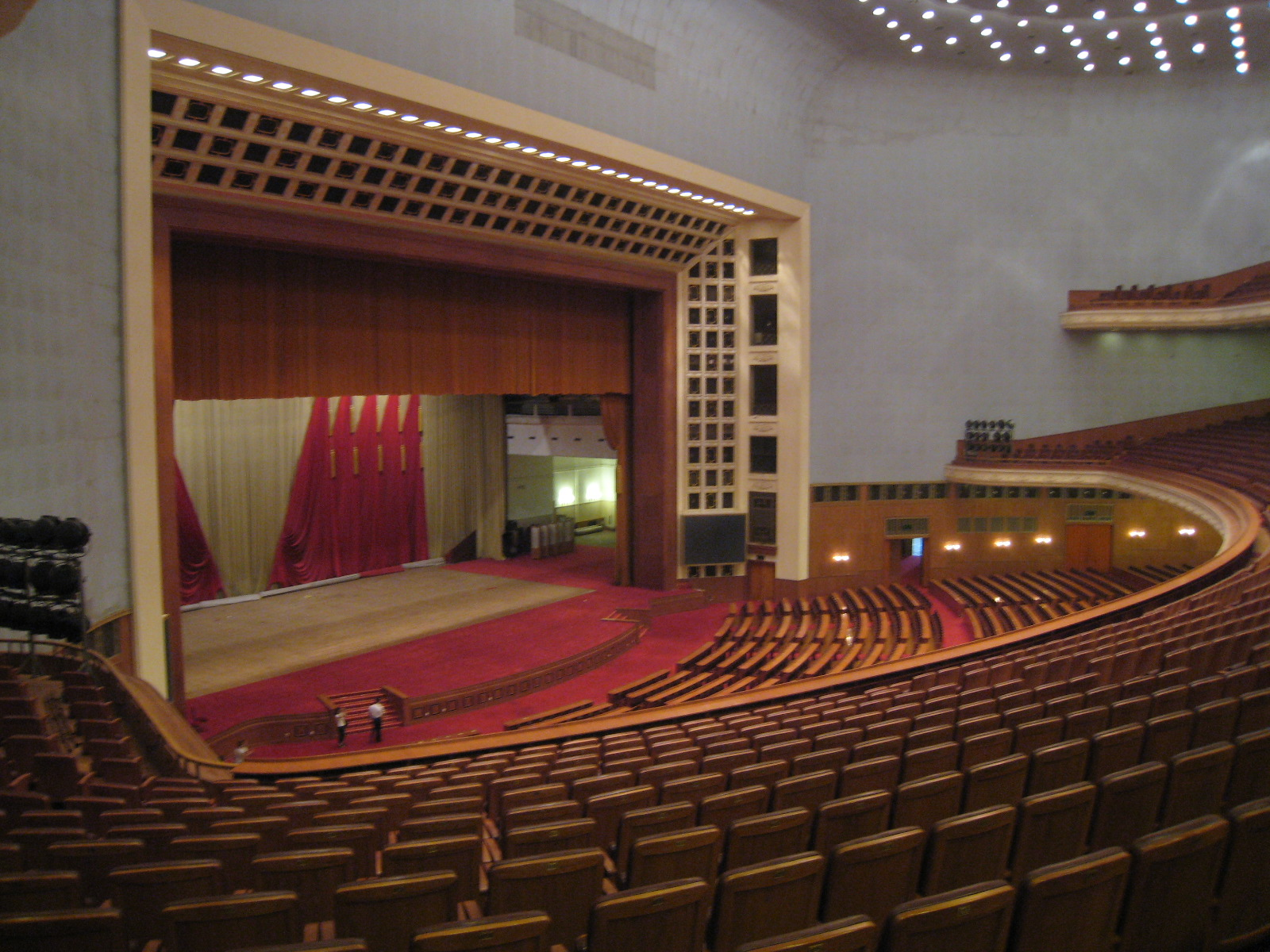
- Great Hall of the People, Xicheng District, Beijing

Website
- en.npc.gov.cn.cdurl.cn

Constitution
- Constitution of the People's Republic of China

Rules
- Rules of Procedure for the National People's Congress of the People's Republic of China (English)

National People's Congress

Chinese name
- Simplified Chinese: 全国人民代表大会
- Traditional Chinese: 全國人民代表大會
- Literal meaning: Nationwide People Representative Assembly
Transcriptions
Standard Mandarin
- Hanyu Pinyin: Quánguó Rénmín Dàibiǎo Dàhuì
Yue: Cantonese
- Jyutping: cyun4gwok3 jan4man4 doi6biu2 daai6wui2

Abbreviation
- Simplified Chinese: 全国人大
- Traditional Chinese: 全國人大
Transcriptions
Standard Mandarin
- Hanyu Pinyin: Quánguó Réndà
Yue: Cantonese
- Jyutping: cyun4gwok3 jan4daai6

Other abbreviation
- Simplified Chinese: 中国人大
- Traditional Chinese: 中國人大
Transcriptions
Standard Mandarin
- Hanyu Pinyin: Zhōngguó Réndà
Yue: Cantonese
- Jyutping: zung1gwok3 jan4daai6

Tibetan name
- Tibetan: རྒྱལ་ཡོངས་མི་དམངས་འཐུས་མི་ཚོགས་ཆེན་
Transcriptions
- Wylie: rgyal yongs mi dmangs 'thus mi tshogs chen

Zhuang name
- Zhuang: Daengx Guek Yinzminz Daibyauj Daihhoih

Korean name
- Hangul: 전국인민대표대회
Transcriptions
- Revised Romanization: Jeonguk Inmin Daepyo Daehoe
- McCune–Reischauer: Chŏn'guk Inmin Taep'yo Taehoe

Mongolian name
- Mongolian Cyrillic: Бүх улсын ардын төлөөлөгчдийн их хурал
- Mongolian script: ᠪᠦᠬᠦ ᠤᠯᠤᠰ ᠤᠨ ᠠᠷᠠᠳ ᠤᠨ ᠲᠦᠯᠤᠭᠡᠯᠡᠭᠴᠢᠳ ᠤᠨ ᠶᠡᠭᠡ ᠬᠤᠷᠠᠯ

Uyghur name
- Uyghur: مەملىكەتلىك خەلق قۇرۇلتىيى
Transcriptions
- Latin Yëziqi: Memliketlik xelq qurultiyi
- Yengi Yeziⱪ: Məmlikətlik həlⱪ ⱪurultiyi

Kazakh name
- Kazakh: مەملەكەتتىك حالىق قۇرىلتايى

Yi name
- Yi: ꇩꏤꑭꊂꏓꂱꁧꎁꃀꀉꒉ

The National People's Congress (NPC) is the supreme state organ of power of the People's Republic of China that heads the country's people's congress system. It is vested with unified state power and carries out its duties under the control of the Chinese Communist Party (CCP), as the party is constitutionally enshrined as having the "leading role" in China's communist state system. The NPC uses its status in the state system to establish a division of labour between itself and inferior state organs. The relationship between the NPC and the inferior organs make up the unified state apparatus.

As the supreme organ of state power, the NPC has the power to amend China's communist state constitution, enact legislation, and oversee the operations of the state's inferior organs. It elects and can remove the top officials of the inferior state organs: the State Council, the state president, the Supreme People's Court (SPC), the Supreme People's Procuratorate, the National Supervisory Commission, and the Central Military Commission. Since the session of the NPC, referred to as the full Congress, typically convenes only once per year, it delegates the majority of its powers to its permanent organ, the Standing Committee of the National People's Congress (NPCSC). The NPCSC consists of approximately 170 legislators and holds bi-monthly sessions to ensure the continuous exercise of state power when the NPC is not in session.

The NPC holds annual sessions every spring, usually lasting from 10 to 14 days, in the Great Hall of the People on the west side of Tiananmen Square in Beijing. At these sessions, it votes on important pieces of legislation and personnel assignments, among other things. These sessions are usually timed to occur with the meetings of the National Committee of the Chinese People's Political Consultative Conference (CPPCC), a consultative organ whose members represent various social groups. As the NPC and the CPPCC are the main deliberative organs of China, they are often referred to as the "Two Sessions" (Lianghui). According to the NPC, its annual meetings provide an opportunity for the officers of state to review past policies and to present future plans to the nation.

In China, as with most communist states, the legislative body of the NPC has been characterized as a rubber stamp for the CCP. (Note: See references:) The deputies are elected by provincial-level people's congresses, which are themselves indirectly elected. The CCP controls the nomination and election processes at all levels of the people's congress system. The NPC and its Standing Committee are required to uphold the leadership of the CCP and adhere to CCP ideology per law. With 2,847 members in 2026, it is the largest legislative organ in the world. The NPC is elected for a term of five years. Membership for deputies is part-time and unpaid. Delegates to the National People's Congress may hold seats in other organs of government simultaneously, and the party and the NPC typically include all senior figures in Chinese politics. However, membership of the Standing Committee is often full-time and carries a salary, and Standing Committee members are not allowed to simultaneously hold positions in executive, judicial, prosecutorial, or supervisory posts.

== History ==
The current National People's Congress can trace its origins to the First National Congress of the Chinese Soviets of Workers', Peasants' and Soldiers' Deputies. This was held on 7 November 1931, in Ruijin, Jiangxi, on the 14th anniversary of the Russian October Revolution—with a subsequent Soviet Congress taking place in Fujian on 18 March 1932, the 61st Anniversary of the Paris Commune. The official Second National Congress took place from 22 January to 1 February 1934. During the event, only 693 deputies were elected with the Chinese Red Army taking 117 seats.

In 1945, at the conclusion of the Second Sino-Japanese War, the CCP and the Kuomintang held a Political Consultative Conference with the parties holding talks on political reforms. This was included in the Double Tenth Agreement, which was implemented by the Nationalist government, who organized the first Political Consultative Assembly from 10 to 31 January 1946. Representatives of the Kuomintang, CCP, Young China Party, and China Democratic League, as well as independent delegates, attended the conference in Chongqing, a temporary capital of the Republic of China during the war.

A second Political Consultative Conference took place in September 1949, inviting delegates from various friendly parties to attend and discuss the establishment of a new state (PRC). This conference was then renamed the People's Political Consultative Conference. The first conference approved the Common Program, which served as the de facto constitution for the next five years. The conference approved the new national anthem, flag, capital city, and state name, and elected the first government of the People's Republic of China. It was a de facto legislature of the PRC during the first five years of existence. In 1954, the Constitution transferred this function to the National People's Congress.

== Organization ==
The NPC meets for about two weeks each year at the same time as the National Committee of the Chinese People's Political Consultative Conference, usually in the spring. The combined sessions have been known as the Two Sessions (Lianghui). Between these sessions, NPC's power are exercised by the Standing Committee of the National People's Congress. During the Two Sessions, the NPC and the CPPCC hear and discuss reports from the premier of the State Council, the president of the Supreme People's Court, and the prosecutor general.

=== Presidium ===
Before each plenary session of the NPC, a preparatory meeting is held, where a Presidium and a Secretary-General for the plenary session is elected. The Presidium presides over the daily affairs of the Congress during its plenary session days, determining its daily schedule, decides whether to list a delegate's bill on the agenda, hear deputy deliberation reports and decides whether to put an item to vote, nominates the candidates for the top state offices, and organizes the constitutional oath of office ceremonies. Its functions are defined in the Organic Law of the NPC, but not how it is composed.

=== Standing Committee ===
The NPC Standing Committee is the permanent organ of the NPC, elected by the legislature to meet regularly as opposed to once a year. It consists of a chairman, vice chairpersons, a secretary-general, as well as regular members. NPCSC membership is often full-time and carries a salary, and members are not allowed to simultaneously hold positions in executive, judicial, prosecutorial or supervisory posts.

As the NPC only meets annually, the NPCSC effectively functions as the national legislature of China for the rest of the year. It is granted with nearly all the lawmaking powers as the NPC itself, though it lacks the powers to amend the constitution and to appoint or remove national-level personnel. The NPCSC passes the vast majority of China's laws, and has the powers to conduct oversight over governmental organs, appoint or remove top-level personnel that are not in the national-level, ratifies treaties, grant special amnesties, and confer state honors.

==== Special Committees ====
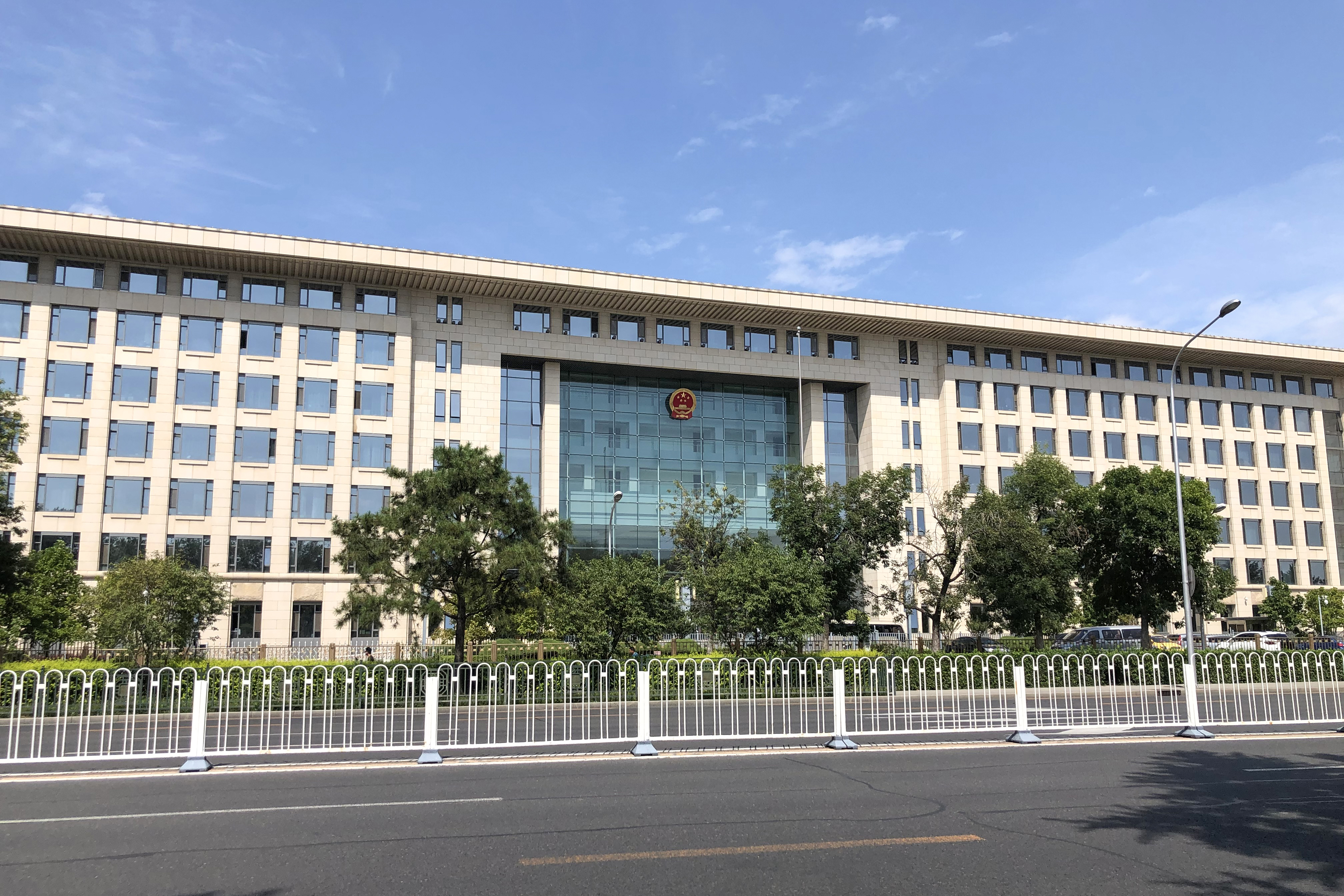
Office Building of the National People's Congress

In addition to the Standing Committee, ten special committees have been established under the NPC to study issues related to specific fields. They include full time staff, who meet regularly to draft and discuss legislative work and policy proposals and the deputies assigned to the committees. A large portion of legislative work in China are effectively delegated to these committees in between the bimonthly plenary sessions of the NPCSC. There are currently 10 special committees, which are:

- Ethnic Affairs Committee
- Constitution and Law Committee
- Supervisory and Judicial Affairs Committee
- Financial and Economic Affairs Committee
- Education, Science, Culture and Public Health Committee
- Foreign Affairs Committee
- Overseas Chinese Affairs Committee
- Environmental Protection and Resources Conservation Committee
- Agriculture and Rural Affairs Committee
- Social Development Affairs Committee

These are organized in like manner as the Standing Committee.

==== Working organs ====
A number of working organs have also been established under the Standing Committee to provide support for the day-to-day operation of the NPC. These include:

- General Office
- Credentials Committee
- Legislative Affairs Commission
- Budgetary Affairs Commission
- Hong Kong Basic Law Committee
- Macao Basic Law Committee
- Deputies Affairs Commission

== Powers and responsibilities ==
Under the constitution, the NPC is the supreme state organ of power in China, and all four Chinese constitutions have granted it a large amount of lawmaking power. According to Chinese legal scholar Zhou Fang, "[t]he powers of the National People's Congress as the [SSOP] are boundless, its authority extends to the entire territory of the country, and, if necessary, it can intervene in any matter which it finds it requisite to do so." The presidency, the State Council, the PRC Central Military Commission, the Supreme People's Court, the Supreme People's Procuratorate, and the National Supervisory Commission are all formally under the authority of the NPC.

The constitution mandates a leadership role for the CCP. The Organic Law of the National People's Congress states that the "National People's Congress and its Standing Committee uphold the leadership of the Communist Party of China" and adhere "to the guiding principles of Marxism–Leninism, Mao Zedong Thought, Deng Xiaoping Theory, the Theory of Three Represents, the Scientific Outlook on Development, and the Xi Jinping Thought on Socialism with Chinese Characteristics for a New Era".

The NPC does not serve as a forum of debate between government and opposition parties as is the case with Western parliaments. This has led to the NPC being described as a rubber stamp legislature or as only being able to affect issues of low sensitivity and salience to the CCP. Legislation typically passes quickly, but there are notable examples where laws do not get through the NPC, and negative votes have become more commonplace since its inception.

According to academic Rory Truex of the Princeton School of Public and International Affairs, NPC "deputies convey citizen grievances but shy away from sensitive political issues, and the government in turn displays partial responsiveness to their concerns." According to Austin Ramzy, writing for The New York Times, the NPC "is a carefully crafted pageant intended to convey the image of a transparent, responsive government." One of the NPC's members, Hu Xiaoyan, told BBC News in 2009 that she has no power to help her constituents. She was quoted as saying, "As a parliamentary representative, I don't have any real power."

Formally, there are four main functions and powers of the NPC:

=== Constitutional supervision ===
The NPC has the sole power to amend the constitution. Amendments to the Constitution must be proposed by the NPC Standing Committee or one-fifth or more of the NPC deputies. In order for the Amendments to become effective, they must be passed by a two-thirds majority vote of all deputies. The NPC is also responsible for supervising the enforcement of the constitution.

The CCP leadership plays a large role in the approval of constitutional amendments. In contrast to ordinary legislation, which the CCP leadership approves the legislation in principle, and in which the legislation is then introduced by government ministers or individual NPC delegates, constitutional amendments are drafted and debated within the party, approved by the CCP Central Committee and then presented by party deputies under the Standing Committee to the whole of the NPC during its yearly plenary session. If Congress is on recess and the Standing Committee is in session, the same process is repeated by either the party leader in the NPCSC or by one of the party deputies, but following the approval by the NPCSC, the amendments will be presented during the plenary session to all of the deputies for a final vote on the matter. If a fifth or more of the CCP party faction deputies will propose amendments either on their own or with the other parties in plenary session, the same process is applied. In contrast to ordinary legislation, in which the Legislation Law largely directs the process, the process for constitutional revision is largely described by CCP documents; the 2014 Decision Concerning Several Major Issues in Comprehensively Advancing Governance According to Law states that "The Party Central Committee submits proposals for amending the Constitution to the National People’s Congress".

In addition to passing legislation, the NPCSC interacts with local governments through its constitutional review process. In contrast with other jurisdictions by which constitutional enforcement is considered a judicial power, in Chinese political theory, constitutional enforcement is considered a legislative power, and Chinese courts do not have the authority to determine constitutionality of legislation or administrative measures. Challenges to constitutionality have therefore become the responsibility of the National People's Congress which has a recording and review mechanism for constitutional issues. The NPC has created a set of institutions which monitor local administrative measures for constitutionality. Typically, the Legislative Affairs Committee will review legislation for constitutionality and then inform the enacting agencies of its findings, and rely on the enacting agency to reverse its decision. Although the NPC has the legal authority to annul unconstitutional legislation by a local government, it has never used that power.

=== Election and appointment of officials ===
The NPC elects and appoints top-level positions in the Chinese state. The following positions are elected:

- Deputies serving as part of the NPC Standing Committee, including its chairperson, Vice Chairperson, Secretary-General, and regular members
- President of China
- Vice President of China
- Chairperson of the Central Military Commission
- Director of the National Supervisory Commission
- President of the Supreme People's Court
- Procurator-General of the Supreme People's Procuratorate

The following positions are appointed:

- Deputies serving as part of the NPC Special Committees, including their chairpersons, Vice Chairpersons, and regular members (nominated by the Presidium)
- Premier of the State Council (nominated and appointed by the President)
- Other members of the State Council (nominated by the Premier, appointed by the President)
- Vice Chairpersons and members of the Central Military Commission (nominated by the chairperson)

Elections and appointments differ in that elections can theoretically be competitive with multiple candidates submitted by the Presidium, or with write-in votes by the delegates, while the delegates can only vote for the official nominee in appointments. However, nearly all of the elections are non-competitive with a single candidate, with only elections for the regular members of the NPCSC being competitive since 1988. The election and appointments for high-ranking posts are effectively decided secretly within the CCP months in advance, with NPC delegates having no say in these decisions. Elections held in extraordinary circumstances have a similar approach with CCP involvement, in particular during cases wherein the presidency, vice presidency or both are vacant.

According to official accounts, in a normal election, the process of selecting the nominees generally entails repeated discussions between Party leaders, multiple rounds of discussions with CCP members in high-ranking positions and with major non-Party organizations, as well as anti-corruption and political review of the potential candidates. The list of candidates is then approved first by the CCP's Politburo Standing Committee, and then by its Politburo. If the candidates in question are nominated for a top-level position, namely the president and vice president; NPCSC chairperson and vice chairpersons; heads of the National Supervisory Commission, the Supreme People's Court, and the Supreme people's Procuratorate; the State Council premier, vice premiers, and state councilors; and all CMC members, the Central Committee also endorses the nominees in a special plenary session just before the NPC plenary session for election by the deputies.

Before the plenary session ends, the CCP customarily holds a "democratic consultative meeting", formally informing non-CCP organizations, such as the country's eight minor non-oppositional political parties, of the proposed nominees and soliciting their views on the candidates. Full Central Committee endorsement for lower-level positions, such as regular NPCSC members, the State Council Secretary-General and departmental heads, and all members of the Special Committees and their committee chairpersons, is not expected, however. During the NPC session, the official in the Presidium in charge of personnel explains the proposed nominees and the selection process to the delegates. The delegates are then granted the short bios of the candidates, and given time for "deliberations and consultations", or simply "deliberations" for the appointed positions.

=== Legislation ===
The NPC's has the sole power to "enact and amend basic criminal and civil laws, basic laws governing the State organs, and other basic laws". To do this, the NPC acts in accordance with the Constitution and laws of the People's Republic in regards to its legislative activities. When the congress is in recess, its Standing Committee enacts all legislation presented to it by the CCP Central Committee, the State Council, the Central Military Commission, other government organs or by the deputies themselves either of the standing committee or those of the committees within the NPC.

The primary role of the CCP in the legislative process largely is exercised during the proposal and drafting of any legislation. Before the NPC considers legislation, there are working groups which study the proposed topic, and CCP leadership must first agree to any legislative changes before they are presented to either the full Congress or the NPCSC.

The legislative process of the NPCSC works according to a five-year work plan drafted by the Legislative Affairs Commission. Within the work plan, a specific piece of legislative is drafted by a group of legislators or administrative agencies within the State Council, these proposals are collected into a yearly agenda which outlines the work of the NPC in a particular year. This is followed by consultation by experts and approving in principle by the CCP. Afterwards, the legislation undergoes three readings and public consultation. The final approval is done in a NPC plenary session in which by convention the vote is near unanimous, if Congress is in recess, the same process is applied in a NPCSC plenary session.

The NPC had never rejected a government bill until 1986, during the Bankruptcy Law proceedings, wherein a revised bill was passed in the same session. An outright rejection without a revised version being passed occurred in 2000 when a Highway Law was rejected, the first occurrence in sixty years of history. Moreover, in 2015, the NPC refused to pass a package of bills proposed by the State Council, insisting that each bill require a separate vote and revision process. The time for legislation can be as short as six months, or as long as 15 years for controversial legislation such as the Anti-Monopoly Law.

=== Determining major state issues worthy of legislative action ===
The NPC's other legislative work is creating legislation on, examining, and reviewing major national issues of concern presented to the Congress by either the CCP Central Committee, the State Council, or its own deputies either of the NPCSC or its committees. These include legislation on the report on the plan for national economic and social development and on its implementation, the national budget, and other matters. The Basic Laws of both the Hong Kong Special Administrative Region and the Macao Special Administrative Region, and the laws creating Hainan Province and Chongqing Municipality and the building of the Three Gorges Dam on the Yangtze River were all passed by the NPC in plenary session, legislation passed by the Standing Committee when it is in recess carry the same weight as those of the whole of the Congress. In performing these responsibilities either as a whole chamber or by its Standing Committee, the NPC acts in accordance with the Constitution and the laws of the People's Republic in acting on these issues in aid of legislation.

In practice, although the final votes on laws of the NPC often return a high affirmative vote, a great deal of legislative activity occurs in determining the content of the legislation to be voted on. A major bill such as the Securities Law can take years to draft, and a bill sometimes will not be put before a final vote if there is significant opposition to the measure either within the Congress or by deputies in the Standing Committee.

=== Foreign outreach ===
Like all official organs, the NPC is responsible for carrying out united front work. The NPC conducts outreach campaigns with foreign legislatures and parliamentarians for relationship-building and promotion of major CCP policy initiatives.

== Membership ==
The Election Law restricts the NPC's maximum size to 3,000 deputy seats. Under the people's congress system, the NPC is elected by the 32 people's congresses at the province-level. People's congresses are indirectly elected, except at the county and township level where they are directly elected by citizens. Additionally, delegations are allocated to the People's Liberation Army (PLA) and the People's Armed Police, the special administrative regions of Hong Kong and Macau, as well as the claimed province of Taiwan. Membership to the congress is part-time in nature and carries no pay, with deputies spending around 49 weeks per year at their home provinces. NPC members may be elected to represent a province that they do not live in. Delegates have the legal right to make speeches in the full chamber of the Great Hall of the People during NPC sessions, though they rarely exercise this right. Delegates are allowed to simultaneously hold seats in other bodies of government and the party and the NPC typically includes all of the senior officials in Chinese politics.

The CCP maintains control over the composition of deputies of people's congresses, especially in the National People's Congress. By law, all elections at all levels must adhere to the leadership of the CCP. Although CCP approval is, in effect, essential for membership in the NPC, approximately a third of the seats are by convention reserved for non-CCP members. This includes technical experts and deputies of the eight minor parties. While these members provide technical expertise and a somewhat greater diversity of views, they do not function as a political opposition. The Election Law requires the composition of NPC delegates to be "broadly representative". Since the beginning of the reform and opening up era in 1978, each NPC has released a "decision on the quotas and elections" for the following NPC, allocating a certain number of seats for demographic groups or setting guidelines on particular groups' representations.

=== Demographics ===
Congress	Year	Total deputies	Female deputies	Female %	Minority deputies	Minority %	Ref
1st	1954	1226	147	12	178	14.5	
2nd	1959	1226	150	12.2	179	14.6	
3rd	1964	3040	542	17.8	372	12.2	
4th	1975	2885	653	22.6	270	9.4	
5th	1978	3497	742	21.2	381	10.9	
6th	1983	2978	632	21.2	403	13.5	
7th	1988	2978	634	21.3	445	14.9	
8th	1993	2978	626	21	439	14.8	
9th	1998	2979	650	21.8	428	14.4	
10th	2003	2985	604	20.2	414	13.9	
11th	2008	2987	637	21.3	411	13.8	
12th	2013	2987	699	23.4	409	13.7	
13th	2018	2980	742	24.9	438	14.7	
14th	2023	2977	790	26.5	442	14.8	

==== Hong Kong, Macau and Taiwan delegations ====
Hong Kong has had a separate delegation since the 9th NPC in 1998, and Macau since the 10th NPC in 2003. The delegates from Hong Kong and Macau are elected via an electoral college rather than by popular vote, but do include significant political figures who are residing in the two regions. Since their transfer of sovereignty, Hong Kong and Macau have been given 36 and 12 deputies elected to the NPC respectively.

The NPC has included a Taiwan delegation since the 4th NPC in 1975, in line with the PRC's position that Taiwan is a province of China. Prior to the 2000s, the Taiwan delegates in the NPC were mostly Taiwanese members of the Chinese Communist Party who fled Taiwan after 1947. They are now either deceased or elderly, and in the last three Congresses, only one of the "Taiwan" deputies was actually born in Taiwan (Chen Yunying, wife of economist Justin Yifu Lin); the remainder are "second-generation Taiwan compatriots", whose parents or grandparents came from Taiwan. Delegations from Taiwan are chosen by "consultative election meetings" composed of 120 "compatriots of Taiwanese ancestry" hailing from various provinces in China, the central government and party agencies, and the military. Since the 6th NPC, Taiwan has been given 6 deputies at the NPC.

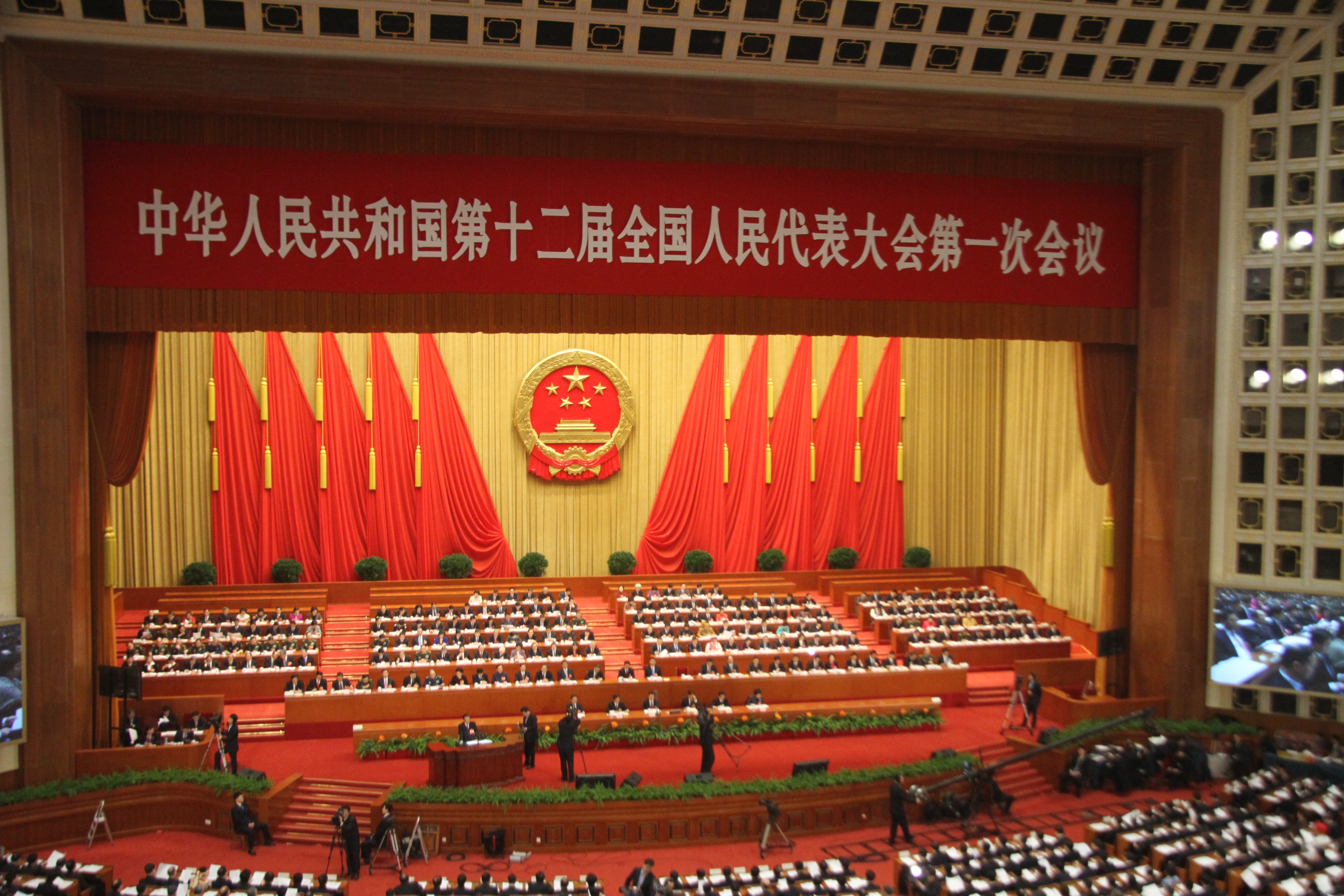
The 12th National People's Congress held in 2013

==== Military representation ====
The military sends its own delegation to the NPC, which is elected by servicemember election committees of top-level military subdivisions, including the PLA's theater commands and service branches. After the People's Armed Police (PAP) was placed under the command of the Central Military Commission in 2018, the PLA and PAP have formed a joint delegation. The PLA delegation has been amongst the largest since the founding of the NPC, making up anywhere from 4 percent of the total delegates (3rd NPC), to 17 percent (4th NPC). Since the 5th NPC, it has usually held about 9 percent of the total delegate seats, and is consistently the largest delegation in the NPC. In the 14th NPC, for example, the PLA and PAP delegation has 281 deputies; the next largest delegation is Shandong, with 173 deputies.

==== Ethnic minorities and overseas Chinese representation ====
A 150-seat quota for ethnic minorities was enacted in China's first election law in 1953. The 1982 constitution mandates that every ethnic minority should have "an appropriate number of delegates". The 5th NPC abandoned an explicit quota for ethnic minorities, substituting it with an allocation of "approximately 12%" of all seats for the next NPC, a practice followed by all subsequent NPC meetings. Per the Election Law, the NPCSC is authorized to allocate the quota seats to each provincial delegation based on the "population and distribution". The law also requires that each of China's 55 official ethnic minorities have at least one elected deputy to Congress. For the first three NPCs, there was a special delegation for returned overseas Chinese, but this was eliminated starting in the 4th NPC, and although overseas Chinese remain a recognized group in the NPC, they are now scattered among the various delegations.

==== Background of delegates ====
The Hurun Report has tracked the wealth of some of the NPC's delegates: in 2013, 90 delegates were among the richest 1000 Chinese, each having a net worth of at least 1.8 billion yuan ($289.4 million). This richest 3% of delegates' average net worth was $1.1 billion (compared to an average net worth of $271 million for the richest 3% in the United States Congress at the time). In 2018, the 153 delegates classed by the report as "super rich" (including China's wealthiest person, Pony Ma) had a combined wealth of $650 billion. This was up from a combined wealth of $500 billion for the wealthiest 209 delegates in 2017, when (according to state media) 20% of delegates were private entrepreneurs. The presence of the richest Chinese in the NPC dropped sharply from 2013 to 2023.

== See also ==
- List of voting results of the National People's Congress
