= Standing Committee of the National People's Congress =

Permanent organ of China

Standing Committee of the National People's Congress of the People's Republic of China 中华人民共和国全国人民代表大会 常务委员会
- Standing Committee of the 14th National People's Congress

Type
- Type: Permanent organ of the National People's Congress

History
- Founded: 1954; 72 years ago

Leadership
- Chairman: Zhao Leji, Chinese Communist Party (CCP) since 10 March 2023
- Vice Chairpersons: Li Hongzhong, Wang Dongming, Xiao Jie, Tie Ning, Peng Qinghua, Zhang Qingwei, Losang Jamcan, Shohrat Zakir, CCP; Zheng Jianbang, RCCK; Ding Zhongli, CDL; Hao Mingjin, CNDCA; Cai Dafeng, CAPD; He Wei, CPWDP; Wu Weihua, JS since 10 March 2023
- Secretary-General: Liu Qi, CCP since 10 March 2023

Structure
- Seats: 162
- Political groups: Ruling party (107): CCP (107); Democratic Parties and Independents (55): CDL (9); CAPD (7); RCCK (6); CPWDP (5); JS (5); CNDCA (4); TDSL (3); CZGP (3); Independent (13)

Elections
- Voting system: Indirect modified block combined approval voting
- First election: September 1954
- Last election: March 2023
- Next election: March 2028

Meeting place
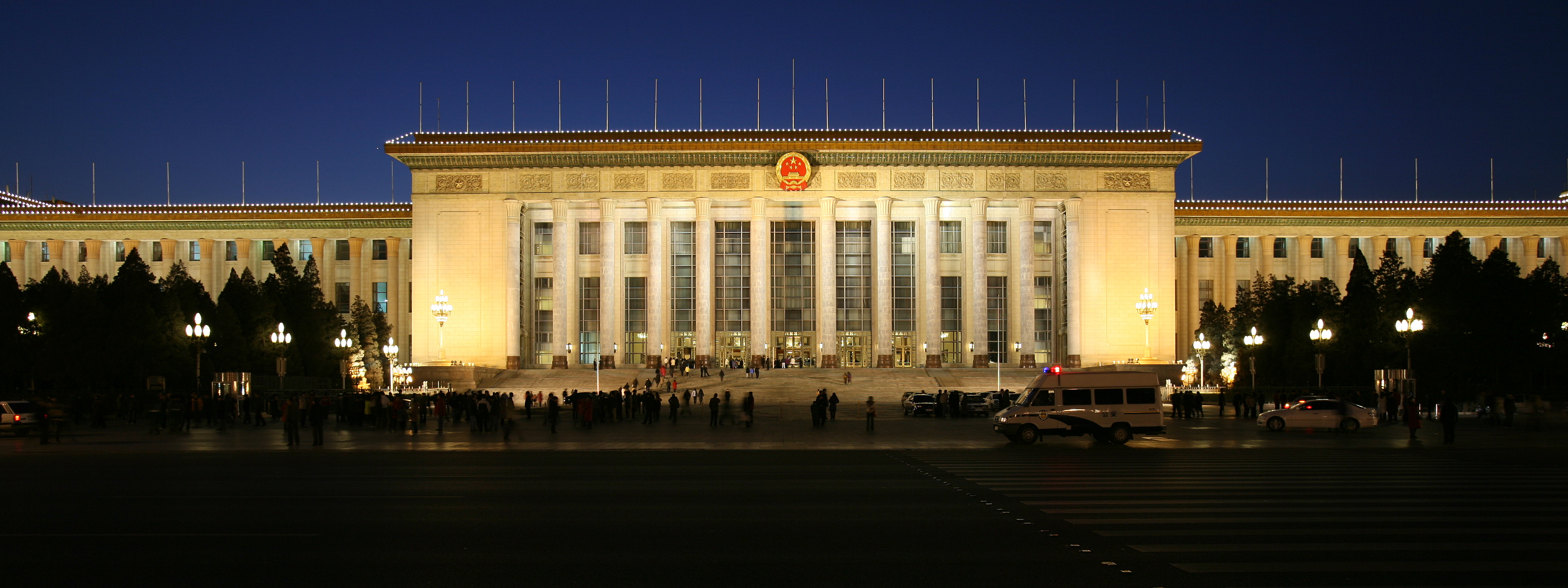
- Great Hall of the People, Xicheng District, Beijing

Website
- en.npc.gov.cn.cdurl.cn

Rules
- Rules of Procedure for the Standing Committee of the National People's Congress (in English)

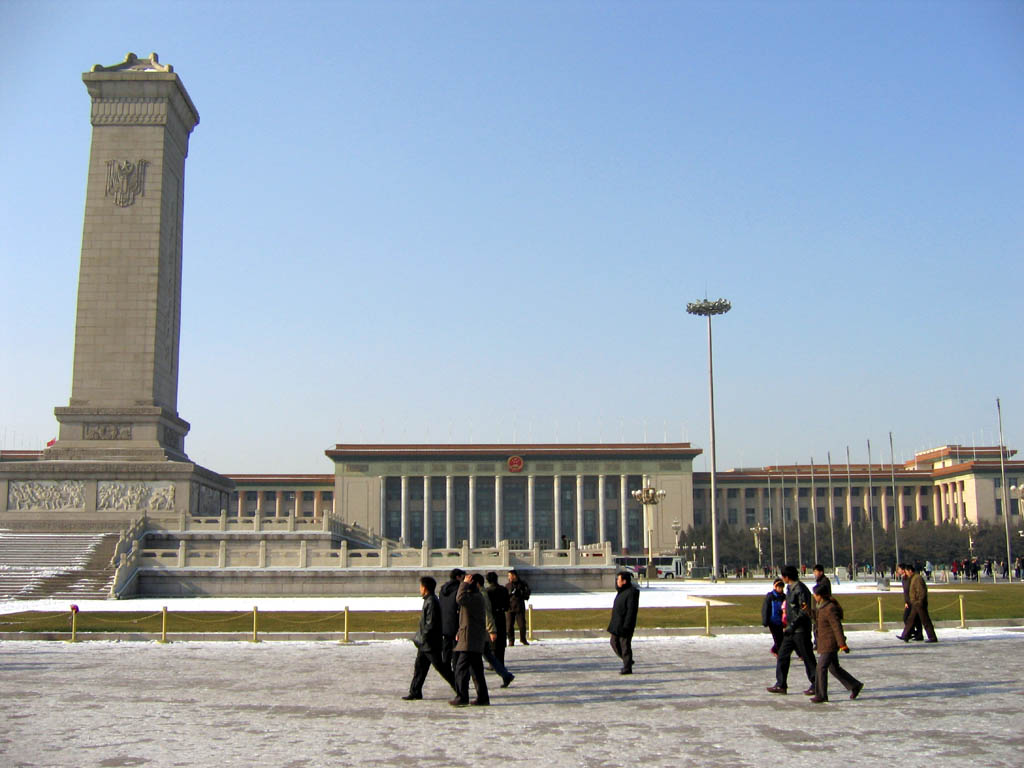
Conference Room of the NPC Standing Committee on Great Hall of the People second floor

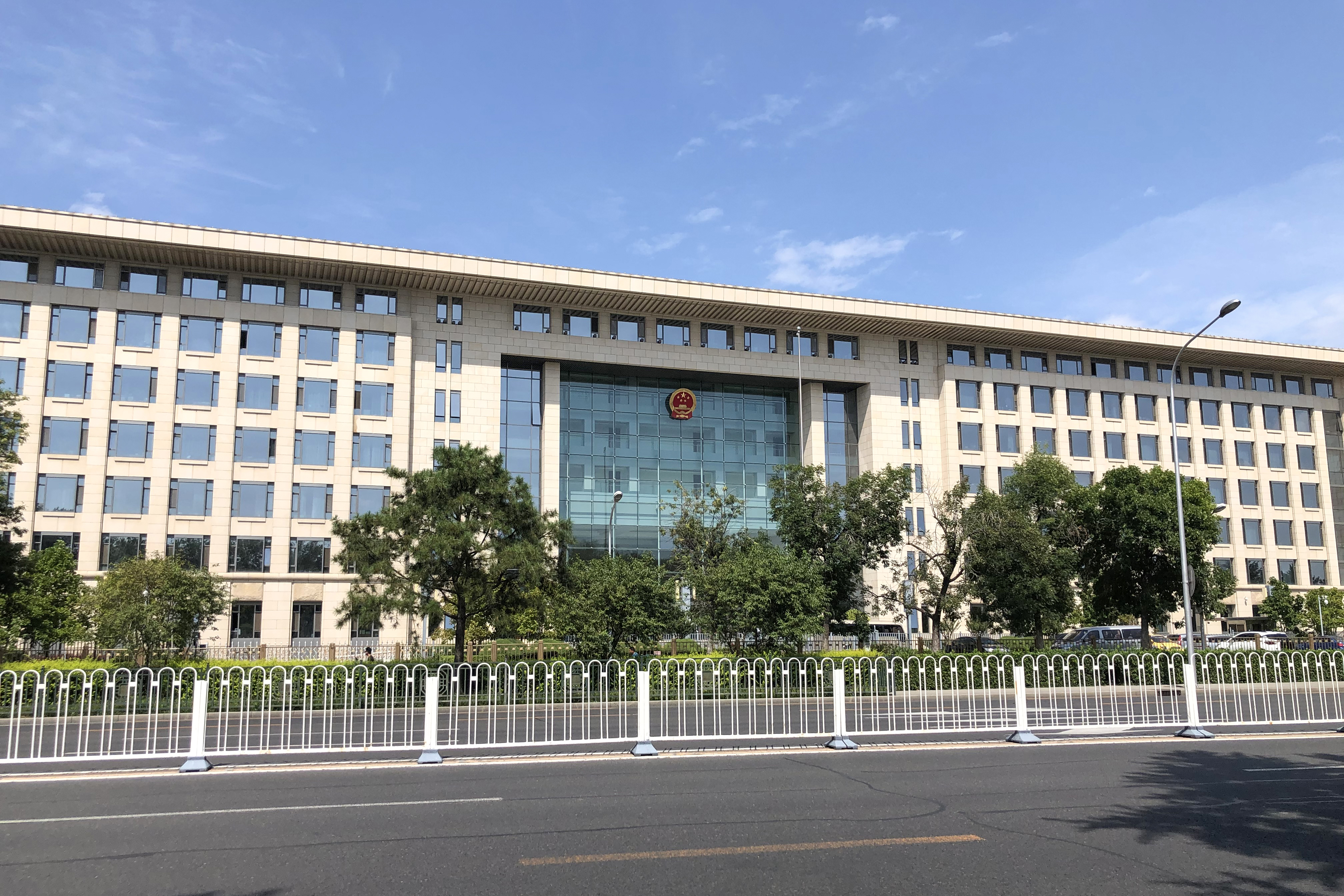
Office Building of the National People's Congress in Beijing

The Standing Committee of the National People's Congress (NPCSC) is the permanent organ of the National People's Congress (NPC), the supreme organ of state power of the People's Republic of China. It exercises the powers of the NPC when it is not in session, which generally meets once a year.

The NPC and its Standing Committee were established in 1954, following the adaptation of the 1954 Constitution of China. The NPCSC is composed of a chairman, vice chairpersons, a secretary-general, and regular members, all of whom are nominated by the NPC Presidium and elected by NPC deputies during NPC sessions. The day-to-day operations of the Standing Committee are handled by the Council of Chairpersons, which is composed of the chairman, vice chairpersons, and the secretary-general. The NPCSC additionally has a number of administrative bodies to provide support for its day-to-day operations.

The powers of the NPCSC include drafting and revising laws except those to be enacted only by the full congress of the NPC, and partially supplementing and amending, when the NPC is not in session, laws enacted by the NPC, provided that the basic principles of these laws are not contravened. The NPCSC also has the power of judicial interpretation of the constitution and law, the power to supervise the enforcement of the state constitution, as well as the power to decide upon major state issues. Although the parent NPC officially has superiority over the Standing Committee, and certain authorities are not delegated, the Standing Committee is generally viewed to have more de facto power, as the NPC convenes only once a year for two weeks, leaving its Standing Committee the only organ that regularly drafts and approves decisions and laws.

== History ==
In 1954, the 1st National People's Congress was held in Beijing, which became the supreme organ of state power of the People's Republic of China. The Standing Committee was established as its permanent organ. The 1954 Constitution of China stipulates that "the National People's Congress is the sole organ that exercises the legislative power of the state" and that the Standing Committee of the National People's Congress has only the power to "interpret laws" and "enact decrees". However, because the number of delegates to the National People's Congress is in the thousands and non-full-time, only one meeting is held annually, and the meeting period cannot be too long. The 2nd NPC authorized its Standing Committee the power to exercise legislative power when the NPC is not in session.

For a while after establishment of the People's Republic, the power of the Standing Committee was limited to interpretation of its constitution and laws. During the political chaos of the Cultural Revolution, the NPC rarely held meetings and the Standing Committee virtually ceased to function. During this period, Chairman Zhu De and First Vice Chairman Dong Biwu had both died, which enabled Vice Chairman Soong Ching-ling, a member of the Revolutionary Committee of the Kuomintang, to exercise the functions and powers of Chairman of the NPCSC to a certain extent.

In 1980, after the decision of the 5th National People's Congress, the "Committee for the Amendment of the Constitution of the People's Republic of China" was formally established, presided over by Ye Jianying, Soong Ching-ling and Peng Zhen, and including the main leaders of the democratic parties, social organizations and jurists. It was responsible for amending and establishing the new constitution. During the discussion on constitutional amendment, Hu Qiaomu, secretary general of the Constitution Revision Committee, proposed cutting the number of NPC deputies to 1,000 and setting up two chambers of 500 each under the NPC to make the NPC a permanent, bicameral organ, in an attempt to change its image as a "rubber stamp". Another committee member proposed to imitate the system used by the Supreme Soviet of the Soviet Union with one chamber composed of representatives from different regions and the other composed of representatives from different professional sectors. Opponents, led by Deng Xiaoping and Ye Jianying, argued that "if the two parties disagree, it will be very troublesome to coordinate and difficult to operate". A compromise was finally reached that greatly expanded the powers of the Standing Committee of the National People's Congress, making it a permanent legislature with the power to enact most laws and to review those for approval by the NPC.

== Composition ==
The NPCSC currently has 175 members, and consists of a chairman, vice chairpersons, a secretary-general, and regular members. The chairman presides over the NPCSC, and presides and convenes its work. The chairman has conventionally been one of the top members of the Chinese Communist Party, ranking as either the second-ranking or third-ranking member of the Politburo Standing Committee since 1998. The chairman, vice chairpersons and the secretary-general collectively make up the Council of Chairpersons, which handles the Standing Committee's daily affairs. Members of the NPCSC must not, at the same time, hold executive, judicial, or supervisory positions. Other members of the NPC do not have this restriction. The Leading Party Members Group comprises the chairman and vice chairpersons who are CCP members, and is responsible for the implementation of the CCP Central Committee's policies.

=== Election ===
The Standing Committee is elected by and from the NPC delegates during a NPC plenary session. The candidates for the NPCSC chairperson, vice chairpersons, secretary-general, and regular members are nominally nominated by the NPC Presidium, though the nomination process is effectively controlled by the CCP. Elections for the non-regular NPCSC members, along with all other NPC elections are not competitive, with a single candidate proposed by the Presidium. In contrast, the elections for the regular NPCSC members have been the only competitive elections in the NPC since 1988; there are more nominees than available seats.

=== Administrative bodies ===
A number of administrative bodies have also been established under the Standing Committee to provide support for the day-to-day operation of the NPCSC. These include:

- General Office
- Credentials Committee
- Legislative Affairs Commission
- Budgetary Affairs Commission
- Hong Kong Basic Law Committee
- Macao Basic Law Committee
- Deputies Affairs Commission

== Functions and powers ==
=== Legislative ===
The NPC and its Standing Committee jointly exercise the power to enact laws in China. The legislative functions of the Standing Committee constitutionally include: drafting and revising laws except those to be enacted only by the full congress of the NPC; partially supplementing and amending, when the NPC is not in session, laws enacted by the NPC, provided that the basic principles of these laws are not contravened. As a result, day-to-day legislative work is conducted by the Standing Committee. Although the NPC has the power to revoke "inappropriate decisions" made by the Standing Committee, so far this power has never been used. As a result, the NPC Standing Committee often has a greater say in legislative deliberations. Bills voted on by the National People's Congress are usually submitted by the Standing Committee after its third reading.

The NPCSC has the power of judicial interpretation of the constitution and law in the PRC, including the Basic Law of Hong Kong and Macau. In contrast to common law jurisdiction in which stare decisis gives the power of both final interpretation and adjudication to a supreme court, within mainland China constitutional and legal interpretation is considered to be a legislative activity rather than a judicial one, and the functions are split so that the NPCSC provides legal interpretations while the Supreme People's Court actually decides cases. Because an interpretation of the NPCSC is legislative in nature and not judicial, it does not affect cases which have already been decided.

Standing Committee of the National People's Congress
- Simplified Chinese: 全国人民代表大会常务委员会
- Traditional Chinese: 全國人民代表大會常務委員會
Transcriptions
Standard Mandarin
- Hanyu Pinyin: Quánguó Rénmín Dàibiǎo Dàhuì Chángwù Wěiyuánhuì
- Wade–Giles: Chʻüan2-kuo2 Jên2-min2 Tai4-piao3 Ta4-hui4 Chʻang2-wu4 Wei3-yüan2-hui4
Yue: Cantonese
- Yale Romanization: Chyùhn gwok Yàhn màhn Doih bíu Daaih wuih Sèuhng mouh Wái yùhn wuih
- Jyutping: Cyun^{4} gwok^{3} Jan^{4} man^{4} Doi^{6} biu^{2} Daai^{6} wui^{6} Soeng^{4} mou^{6} Wai^{2} jyun^{4} wui^{6}

Officially abbreviated as
- Simplified Chinese: 全国人大常委会
- Traditional Chinese: 全國人大常委會
Transcriptions
Standard Mandarin
- Hanyu Pinyin: Quánguó Réndà Chángwěihuì
- Wade–Giles: Chʻüan2-kuo2 Jên2-ta4 Chʻang2-wei3-hui4

=== Supervisory ===
The NPC Standing Committee has the power to supervise the enforcement of the Constitution. It supervises the work of the State Council, the Central Military Commission of the PRC, the National Supervisory Commission, the Supreme People's Court and the Supreme People's Procuratorate. It has the power to annul administrative regulations, decisions and orders of the State Council that go against the Constitution and other legislative acts of the NPC and itself, and to annul local regulations or decisions of the organs of state power of provinces, autonomous regions and municipalities directly under the central government that contravene the Constitution, other laws or administrative regulations of all levels of government, especially national.

=== Power to decide upon major state issues ===
When the NPC is not in session, the Standing Committee examines and approves partial adjustments to the plan for national economic and social development or to the state budget that prove necessary in the course of their implementation. The Standing Committee decides whether to ratify or abrogate treaties and important agreements reached with other countries. It institutes systems of titles and ranks for military and diplomatic personnel, and other specific titles and ranks, state medals and titles of honor as well as the granting of special pardons.

The NPCSC decides on general or partial mobilization, and on entering into a state of emergency throughout China or in particular provinces, autonomous regions or municipalities directly under the central government. When the NPC is not in session, the Standing Committee decides whether to proclaim a state of war in the event of an armed attack on China or in fulfillment of international treaty obligations concerning a common defense against aggression.

== Meetings and procedures ==
The term of office of a member of the NPC Standing Committee is the same as that of the current NPC, and is generally five years. It remains in power until the succeeding NPC elects its standing committee. It convenes the NPC once a year, and may do so when it finds it necessary or with a proposal from one fifth of NPC's members.

The NPC Standing Committee usually holds a committee session once every two months, usually late in even-numbered months, with each session of the committee lasting a week. It may also hold interim sessions if there is a special need. The meetings are convened and chaired by the chairperson. The chairperson may delegate a vice chairperson to preside over a committee session on his or her behalf. Sessions of the Standing Committee may not be held unless a quorum is met of more than half of the members of the Standing Committee present. The Council of Chairpersons shall draft the session agenda of the Standing Committee for the period pertaining and refer it to a plenary session of the Standing Committee for a decision.

According to law, a bill may be proposed by the Chairperson's Council, or submitted to the committee by the State Council, the Central Military Commission, the Supreme People's Court, the Supreme People's Procuratorate and deputies of the special committees of the National People's Congress (or the committee chairmen of these). Ten or more deputies of the Standing Committee may also sign and introduce a bill. After the bill is introduced, the Chairman's Council shall decide on the agenda of the ongoing session of the Standing Committee. The Chairman's Council may refer the bill to the relevant special committee for deliberation and submit a report before deciding to put it on the agenda of the Standing Committee either for the current session or in forthcoming sessions. It also has the right to vote to reject the bill proposed by the above-mentioned organ. When the Chairman's Council rejects a bill, it shall explain the reasons to the Standing Committee and the bill sponsor.

A bill put on the agenda of a Standing Committee session shall be deliberated by the Standing Committee for three times before it is submitted to a vote by deputies. At the first reading, an explanation of the legislative bill made by its sponsor shall be heard in a plenary session of the Standing Committee and then it shall be preliminarily deliberated at group meetings by deputies in the period between sessions. At the second reading, a report of the Constitution and Law Committee on the revision of the draft law and main problems concerned shall be heard in a plenary session, and then the legislative bill shall be further deliberated at group meetings. At the third reading, a report of the aforementioned committee on the results of its deliberation over the draft law shall be heard in another plenary session, and then the revised draft of the law shall be deliberated at group meetings for any final changes. After the revised draft law has been deliberated during sessions of the Standing Committee, the Constitution and Law Committee revises it in accordance with the deliberation opinions of the Standing Committee members and prepares the final version to be voted on. The Council of chairpersons then refers the legislative bill to the Standing Committee for a vote. If the Standing Committee fails to reach an agreement on the bill during the third reading, it shall convene joint group meetings and additional plenary sessions for further discussion, or invite relevant personages, experts and scholars to hold hearings regarding the bill before either the whole of the committee or within groups. After reaching an agreement, it is sent for the vote in a plenary session.

For a bill that has been put on the agenda of the session of the Standing Committee, after each deliberation of the session of the Standing Committee, the draft law and the explanation of its drafting and amendment will be published on the website of the People's Republic of China or the Chinese Government Legal Information Network for public comment.

When voting, the NPC Standing Committee session adopts the absolute majority system, that is, more than half of the committee members present in a session thus producing a quorum, and more than half of the committee members voted in favor, then the bill can be passed. When an affirmative vote and an abstention vote are equal, the chairman has no right to cast a decision vote, and the bill is vetoed.

In fact, although most of the bills deliberated by the Standing Committee of the National People's Congress (NPCSC) have been agreed upon at the third reading, there are still some bills that have been rejected at the voting stage in the history of the Standing Committee of the NPC. For example, in 1989, the Standing Committee of the National People's Congress vetoed the Organic Law of the Urban Residents Committees of the People's Republic of China (Draft) due to different opinions on the wording of the provisions of the bill. For example, in 1999, the Standing Committee of the National People's Congress rejected the Highway Law of the People's Republic of China (Amendment) with 77 votes in favor, 6 against, 42 abstentions and 29 people not participating in the voting, which was just 50% of the total votes.

== Cases ==
=== Regulations on Hong Kong ===
A notable use of the constitutional interpretation power occurred in 1999 over the right of abode issue in the Hong Kong Special Administrative Region in Lau Kong Yung v. Director of Immigration. The NPCSC interpreted the Basic Law of Hong Kong in accordance with the position taken by the Hong Kong government with respect to the eligibility of permanent residency in Hong Kong.

In 2014, the NPCSC set rules for the election of the chief executive of Hong Kong, a decision that was widely opposed by the pro-democracy camp and led to the Umbrella Revolution. In 2016, the NPCSC ruled that Hong Kong lawmakers who take their oath improperly could be immediately disqualified. In June 2020, the NPCSC created and passed the Hong Kong National Security Law, legislation that was kept secret until shortly before it took effect. In November 2020, Carrie Lam sought help from the NPCSC to give authority for the Hong Kong government to disqualify 4 pro-democracy lawmakers from the Legislative Council. In December 2020, it was reported that the NPCSC would move to diminish opposition from district councillors, by unseating those who "breached the red line" and also by removing the 117 seats belonging to district councillors in the chief executive election committee. Earlier in December 2019, Carrie Lam said that the opposition district councillors would be treated the same as those from the pro-Beijing camp, and that "There is no question of the government's commitment to continue to respect the roles and functions of the district council."

In March 2021, the NPCSC approved changes to Hong Kong's electoral system, allowing only "patriots" to serve in the government, and also reducing democratic representation. In December 2022, after John Lee asked the NPCSC whether Jimmy Lai could hire a foreign lawyer, the NPCSC ruled that foreign lawyers could only be hired for national security cases if approved by the chief executive or by the Committee for Safeguarding National Security.

== Chairman and vice chairpersons of the 14th NPCSC ==
Elected by the 14th National People's Congress at its 1st session:

Chairman

Zhao Leji (b. March 1957): 3rd-ranked member of the Politburo Standing Committee of the Chinese Communist Party.

Vice chairpersons (14)

1. Li Hongzhong (b. August 1956): member of the CCP Politburo
2. Wang Dongming (b. July 1956)
3. Xiao Jie (b. June 1957)
4. Zheng Jianbang (b. January 1957): chairman of the Revolutionary Committee of the Chinese Kuomintang.
5. Ding Zhongli (b. January 1957): chairman of the China Democratic League.
6. Hao Mingjin (b. December 1956): chairman of the China National Democratic Construction Association.
7. Cai Dafeng (b. June 1960): chairman of the China Association for Promoting Democracy.
8. He Wei (b. December 1955): chairman of the Chinese Peasants' and Workers' Democratic Party.
9. Wu Weihua (b. September 1956): chairman of Jiusan Society.
10. Tie Ning (b. September 1957): chair of the China Federation of Literary and Art Circles, and of the Chinese Writers Association.
11. Peng Qinghua (b. April 1957)
12. Zhang Qingwei (b. November 1961)
13. Losang Jamcan (b. July 1957): member of the 18th CCCPC; the former chairman of the Standing Committee of the Tibet Autonomous Region People's Congress, and the Chairman of the Tibet Autonomous Region.
14. Shohrat Zakir (b. August 1953): former chairman of Xinjiang.

== See also ==
- Presidium of the Supreme Soviet, a Soviet Union institution, after which Standing Committee of the NPC was modelled.
- Standing Committee of the Supreme People's Assembly of North Korea
- Council of State of Cuba
- Standing Committee of the National Assembly of Vietnam
