= Credentials Committee =

Organization of the NPCSC

Credentials Committee of the Standing Committee of the National People's Congress
- 全国人民代表大会常务委员会 代表资格审查委员会
- Formation: March 1983
- Type: Working committee of the Standing Committee of the National People's Congress
- Location: Office Building of the NPC, No.1 Qianmen West Street, Xicheng District, Beijing
- Director: Yang Xiaochao
- Deputy Directors: Peng Jinhui, Guo Zhenhua
- Parent organization: Standing Committee of the National People's Congress

Credentials Committee
- Simplified Chinese: 全国人民代表大会常务委员会代表资格审查委员会
- Traditional Chinese: 全國人民代表大會常務委員會代表資格審查委員會
Transcriptions
Standard Mandarin
- Hanyu Pinyin: Quánguó Rénmín Dàibiǎo Dàhuì Chángwù Wěiyuánhuì Dàibiǎo Zīgé Shěnchá Wěiyuánhuì

Abbreviation
- Simplified Chinese: 全国人大常委会代表资格审查委员会
- Traditional Chinese: 全國人大常委會代表資格審查委員會
Transcriptions
Standard Mandarin
- Hanyu Pinyin: Quánguó Réndà Chángwěihuì Dàibiǎo Zīgé Shěnchá Wěiyuánhuì

The Credentials Committee of the Standing Committee of the National People's Congress is a commission of the Standing Committee of the National People's Congress (NPCSC), the permanent body of China's top legislature.

== History ==
The National People's Congress established a Credentials Committee in 1954. As the Committee was a temporary institution, it was unable to review the qualifications of representatives in time, leading to the establishment of the permanent Credentials Committee of the NPCSC in March 1983.

== Functions ==
The committee examines the qualifications of deputies elected to the National People's Congress. The Deputies Affairs Commission is responsible for the specific work of the Credentials Committee.

== Structure ==
The committee has its own general office.
