= Council of Chairpersons of the Standing Committee of the National People's Congress =

Government body of China

- Simplified Chinese: 全国人民代表大会常务委员会委员长会议
- Traditional Chinese: 全國人民代表大會常務委員會委員長會議
Transcriptions
Standard Mandarin
- Hanyu Pinyin: Quánguó Rénmín Dàibiǎo Dàhuì Chángwù Wěiyuánhuì Wěiyuán Zhǎnghuìyì

Council of Chairpersons
- Simplified Chinese: 委员长会议
- Traditional Chinese: 委員長會議
Transcriptions
Standard Mandarin
- Hanyu Pinyin: Wěiyuán Zhǎnghuìyì

The Council of Chairpersons of the Standing Committee of the National People's Congress is a body which handles the daily affairs of the Standing Committee of the National People's Congress (NPCSC), which is the permanent body of the National People's Congress (NPC), the national legislature of China. It is composed of the chairman, the vice chairpersons, and the secretary-general of the NPCSC. It holds more frequent meetings than the NPCSC.

== Functions ==
The Council of chairpersons consists of the chairman, vice chairpersons and the secretary-general of the NPCSC. According to the Constitution of China, the Council of chairpersons handles the day-to-day work of the NPCSC. According to the Organic Law of the NPC, the day-to-day work includes:

1. deciding on the duration for each session of the Standing Committee, drafting its legislative agendas, and proposing suggestions on adjusting the agenda when necessary;
2. deciding whether the bills, proposals and written inquiries submitted to the Standing Committee should be referred to the relevant special committees or submitted to plenary sessions of the Standing Committee for deliberation;
3. deciding whether or not to refer bills, proposals, draft decisions, and draft resolutions to be voted in plenary sessions of the Standing Committee, and putting forward opinions on subsequent handling of those yet to be referred;
4. adopting annual work outlines, legislative plans, oversight plans, deputies work plans, plans for special tasks, documents of work disciplines and rules, etc. of the Standing Committee;
5. directing and coordinating the day-to-day work of the special committees; and
6. handling other important day-to-day work assigned to it by law.

The Council of chairpersons additionally proposes the members of the NPC Presidium and the Secretary-General before each NPC session, which is then reviewed and adopted by the Standing Committee. The Council of chairpersons also has the powers to introduce bills to the Standing Committee, recommending the Standing Committee to dismiss some members of the State Council from their posts, and recommend the appointing or removal of vice chairpersons and members of the NPC Special Committees to the Standing Committee. Like the Standing Committee of the National People's Congress, the Council of chairpersons meets in the Great Hall of the People.

== See also ==
Comparable organs in other parliaments:

- Council of Elders of the Bundestag (Germany)
- Conference of Presidents of the European Parliament
- Conference of Presidents (Greece)
