= Laruelle =

Laruelle is a French surname. Notable people with the surname include:

- Annick Laruelle, Belgian economist
- François Laruelle (1937–2024), French philosopher
- Marlène Laruelle (born 1972), French historian, sociologist, and political scientist
- Sabine Laruelle (born 1965), Belgian politician
