= Leading Party Members Group of the Standing Committee of the National People's Congress =

Organization of the Chinese Communist Party

- 中国共产党全国人民代表大会常务委员会党组
- Type: Party group
- Location: Beijing
- Leader: Zhao Leji
- Deputy Leader: Li Hongzhong
- Members: Wang Dongming, Xiao Jie, Tie Ning, Peng Qinghua, Zhang Qingwei, Losang Jamcan, Shohrat Zakir, Liu Qi
- Parent organization: Central Committee of the Chinese Communist Party

Leading Party Members Group of the Standing Committee of the National People's Congress
- Simplified Chinese: 中国共产党中国人民政治协商会议全国委员会党组
Transcriptions
Standard Mandarin
- Hanyu Pinyin: Zhōngguó Gòngchǎndǎng Zhōngguó Rénmín Zhèngzhì Xiéshāng Huìyì Guánguó Wěiyuánhuì Dǎngzǔ

The Leading Party Members Group of the Standing Committee of the National People's Congress is a party group set up under the Central Committee of the Chinese Communist Party in the Standing Committee of the National People's Congress (NPCSC).

== History ==
In May 1978, the Leading Party Members Group of the NPCSC was established. Due to the separation of party and government efforts, the 6th National People's Congress from 1983 to 1988 did not establish a Leading Party Members Group. in August 1989, the Leading Party Members Group was restored after the Tiananmen Square protests and massacre, which ended efforts to separate the party and government.

== Functions ==
The Party Group is responsible for overseeing the implementation of CCP Central Committee policies in the NPCSC. A Politburo meeting in October 2017 after the first plenary session of the 19th CCP Central Committee stipulated that the Leading Party Members Group must report its work to the Politburo and its Standing Committee every year. The Party Group is led by the chairman of the NPCSC, with vice chairpersons and the secretary-general serving as members.
