= Budgetary Affairs Commission =

Organization of the NPCSC

Budgetary Affairs Commission of the Standing Committee of the National People's Congress
- 全国人民代表大会常务委员会 预算工作委员会
- Formation: December 29, 1998
- Type: Working committee of the Standing Committee of the National People's Congress
- Location: Office Building of the NPC, No.1 Qianmen West Street, Xicheng District, Beijing
- Director: Xu Hongcai
- Deputy Directors: Xia Guang, He Chengjun, Qian Fuzhong
- Parent organization: Standing Committee of the National People's Congress

Budgetary Affairs Commission
- Simplified Chinese: 全国人民代表大会常务委员会预算工作委员会
- Traditional Chinese: 全國人民代表大會常務委員會預算工作委員會
Transcriptions
Standard Mandarin
- Hanyu Pinyin: Quánguó Rénmín Dàibiǎo Dàhuì Chángwù Wěiyuánhuì Yùsuàn Gōngzuò Wěiyuánhuì

Abbreviation
- Simplified Chinese: 全国人大常委会预算工作委员会
- Traditional Chinese: 全國人大常委會預算工作委員會
Transcriptions
Standard Mandarin
- Hanyu Pinyin: Quánguó Réndà Chángwěihuì Yùsuàn Gōngzuò Wěiyuánhuì

Shortest abbreviation
- Simplified Chinese: 全国人大常委会预算工委
- Traditional Chinese: 全國人大常委會預算工委
Transcriptions
Standard Mandarin
- Hanyu Pinyin: Quánguó Réndà Chángwěihuì Yùsuàn Gōngwěi

The Budgetary Affairs Commission of the Standing Committee of the National People's Congress is a commission of the Standing Committee of the National People's Congress (NPCSC), the permanent body of China's top legislature.

== History ==
The Budgetary Affairs Commission was established by the sixth session of the Standing Committee of the 9th National People's Congress on 29 December 1998.

== Functions ==
The Commission is a working committee of the NPCSC. It is responsible for assisting the Financial and Economic Affairs Committee of the National People's Congress in undertaking the reviewing of the budget and final accounts, reviewing the budget adjustment plans and supervising the implementation of the budget by the NPC and its Standing Committee, undertaking the drafting of laws and assist the Financial and Economic Affairs Committee in undertaking the specific work of reviewing relevant draft laws under the entrustment of the Council of Chairpersons, undertaking other specific matters concerning the financial budget assigned by the Standing Committee and the Council of Chairpersons and that the Financial and Economic Affairs Committee needs to assist in handling, to require government departments and units to provide budget information and obtain information and explanations with the consent of the Council of Chairpersons, and to investigate the use of budget funds and special funds of various departments, budget units or major construction projects with the approval of the Council of Chairpersons.

== Structure ==
The Budgetary Affairs Commission has the following offices:

1. Office
2. Budget Review Office
3. Bill Office
4. Research Office
