= Office Building of the National People's Congress =

Chinese government building

- 全国人大机关办公楼
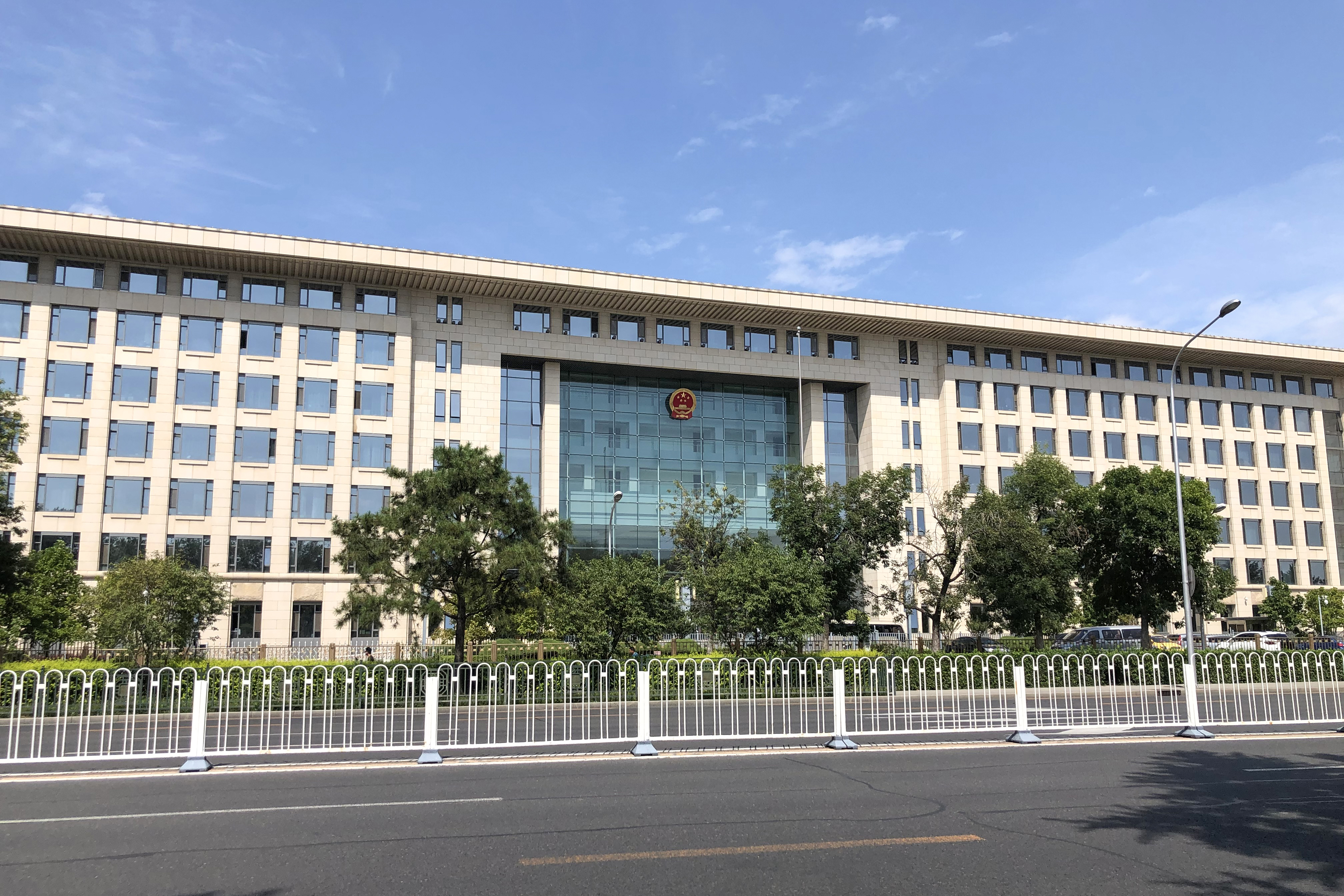
- South Gate of the National People's Congress Office Building
- Interactive map of the Office Building of the National People's Congress area

General information
- Location: No. 1 Qianmen West Street; Xicheng, Beijing, China
- Coordinates: 39.8999°N 116.3877°E

The Office Building of the National People's Congress is the office building of the National People's Congress and its Standing Committee. It is located at No. 1 Qianmen West Street, Xicheng District, Beijing.

== History ==
Since the convening of the first National People's Congress in 1954, the National People's Congress has not had a dedicated office space for more than 50 years. The first National People's Congress in September 1954 and the second National People's Congress in April 1959 were both held in the Huairen Hall of Zhongnanhai. In September 1959, the Great Hall of the People was completed, and the main part of the southern end of the Great Hall of the People was used as the office building of the National People's Congress. Since then, with the increase in the number of personnel and the expansion of the organization of the National People's Congress, the National People's Congress has successively dispersed its offices in Xijiaominxiang, Xihuangchenggen North Street, the Great Hall of the People Hotel, and the Beijing Business Hotel on the South Second Ring Road.

There are 12 large pillars at the south entrance of the Great Hall of the People. In the middle of the pillars hangs a sign with white characters on an orange background, which reads "Standing Committee of the National People's Congress of the People's Republic of China". This sign was not there when the National People's Congress was established. When Wan Li served as the chairman of the Standing Committee of the Seventh National People's Congress, he proposed a series of improvement measures for the institutionalization of the National People's Congress, one of which was to hang a sign, which was soon implemented. Since then, the Standing Committee of the National People's Congress has had this official sign.

At No. 23 Xijiaominxiang, there is a National People's Congress office building known as "No. 23 Courtyard". This was originally an old building of a design institute of the Ministry of Railways of the People 's Republic of China. In the late 1980s, the National People's Congress paid a certain amount of money and took over the use of the building. Before the National People's Congress office building at No. 1 Qianmen West Street was completed and put into use, most of the special committees, working committees and organs of the National People's Congress were concentrated in No. 23 Xijiaominxiang Courtyard.

Starting from the 6th National People's Congress, there was a discussion on whether the Standing Committee of the National People's Congress should have its own office building. At that time, the "Gang of Four" had been crushed. After Peng Zhen became the chairman of the 6th National People's Congress Standing Committee, he advocated the construction of the "Parliament Building". There was a heated discussion at the Party Group Meeting of the Standing Committee of the National People's Congress, and the name was decided at that time as "People's Building". There were many supporters and opponents of the construction of the building at that time. Some National People's Congress representatives proposed that since there was already the Great Hall of the People, the style of hard work should be carried forward. They called the project an image project of "buildings, halls, and offices". In addition, some people were worried about safety issues and coordination with the surrounding architectural styles. Despite the strong opposition at the time, it was finally decided to build the "People's Building" at the current location of the National Grand Theater. After that, the project committee was established, the building model was designed, the houses were relocated, and the funding was obtained. Construction began in 1985. The relocation and foundation laying cost more than 100 million yuan. Soon, due to a series of complex reasons, the project was stranded, the foundation was stopped halfway, and the project wall was soon demolished. After that, the construction site was abandoned for nearly 10 years, with annual maintenance costs of nearly 30 million RMB. The site was even used as a parking lot until the National Grand Theatre was built at the site.

== Building ==
After the establishment of the 10th NPC Standing Committee, the General Office of the NPC Standing Committee began to study the construction of a centralized office space in 2003 to improve the working conditions of the NPC. The NPC set up a preparatory leading group for this purpose. Beijing's planning, construction, land resources, landscaping, fire protection and other departments and Xicheng District provided cooperation. The office building was designed by Beijing Architectural Design Institute and constructed by Sinopec, Beijing Construction Engineering Group, Beijing Panhua Group and others. The project was invested by the Central People's Government with a budget of about RMB 1.3 billion. The site was selected at No. 50 Xijiaominxiang, the former site of the Agricultural and Industrial Bank of China, where the National Journalists Association was located. In 2004, the project was suspended. One of the reasons was said to be the macro-control of the Central People's Government.

Since the former Agricultural and Industrial Bank of China building (a Beijing cultural relic protection site) was located within the construction area of the National People's Congress office building, the building was moved approximately 50 meters to the west and rotated 3 degrees clockwise. The total weight of the move was estimated to be approximately 1,400 tons. The entire translation project was completed on November 30, 2008.

The construction area of the NPC office building was originally located in Beijing No. 29 Middle School. The site of the middle school was originally the site of the National University (renamed "China University" in 1917) founded by Sun Yat-sen and its affiliated middle school. Beijing No. 29 Middle School evolved from the affiliated middle school. In order to build the NPC office building, the middle school was demolished.

On February 18, 2008, the foundation stone laying ceremony of the National People's Congress Office Building was held, and construction began shortly thereafter. The interior decoration was basically completed in 2010, and the building was completed in November 2010. The building area is 83,793 square meters. After its completion, the several office areas of the National People's Congress and its Standing Committee were centralized in the building, ending the scattered situation that had existed for many years. The building was built by Beijing Construction Engineering Group and won the 2011 Luban Award for China's Construction Projects. The nine golden characters "National People's Congress Office Building" written by Wu Bangguo are inlaid on the front wall of the hall.

=== Interior ===
The total land area of the NPC office building is 3.52 hectares, with a total construction area of 136,500 square meters. The main functions include offices, conference rooms, canteens, libraries, information centers, garages, etc. The main entrance of the building is located on the east side. The design emphasizes the outline of the "city" and the "courtyard-style" internal layout. The entire office building has 7 floors above ground and 2 floors underground, with a total height of 30 meters. The structural plan is in the shape of a "目", consisting of two "回"-shaped planes in the east and west and an atrium. On the top of the middle five floors of the building is a simple paved courtyard, which is the atrium. There is a courtyard on the east and west sides of the underground first floor of the building. The east courtyard is a small playground for the staff of the NPC to do exercises during work breaks, and the west courtyard is a garden with a large green area.

On December 3, 2012, to commemorate the 30th anniversary of the promulgation and implementation of the current Constitution of the People 's Republic of China, the National People's Congress held a ceremony to unveil the Constitution Wall in the National People's Congress Office Building. Wu Bangguo, Chairman of the Standing Committee of the National People's Congress, attended the ceremony and cut the ribbon. The wall is located in the National People's Congress Office Building. It is 23 meters long and 2.2 meters high. The wall is made of white marble and is engraved with the full text of the Constitution of China.
