= Chairman of the Standing Committee of the National People's Congress =

High constitutional office of China

- 全国人民代表大会常务委员会委员长
- National emblem of China

- Flag of China

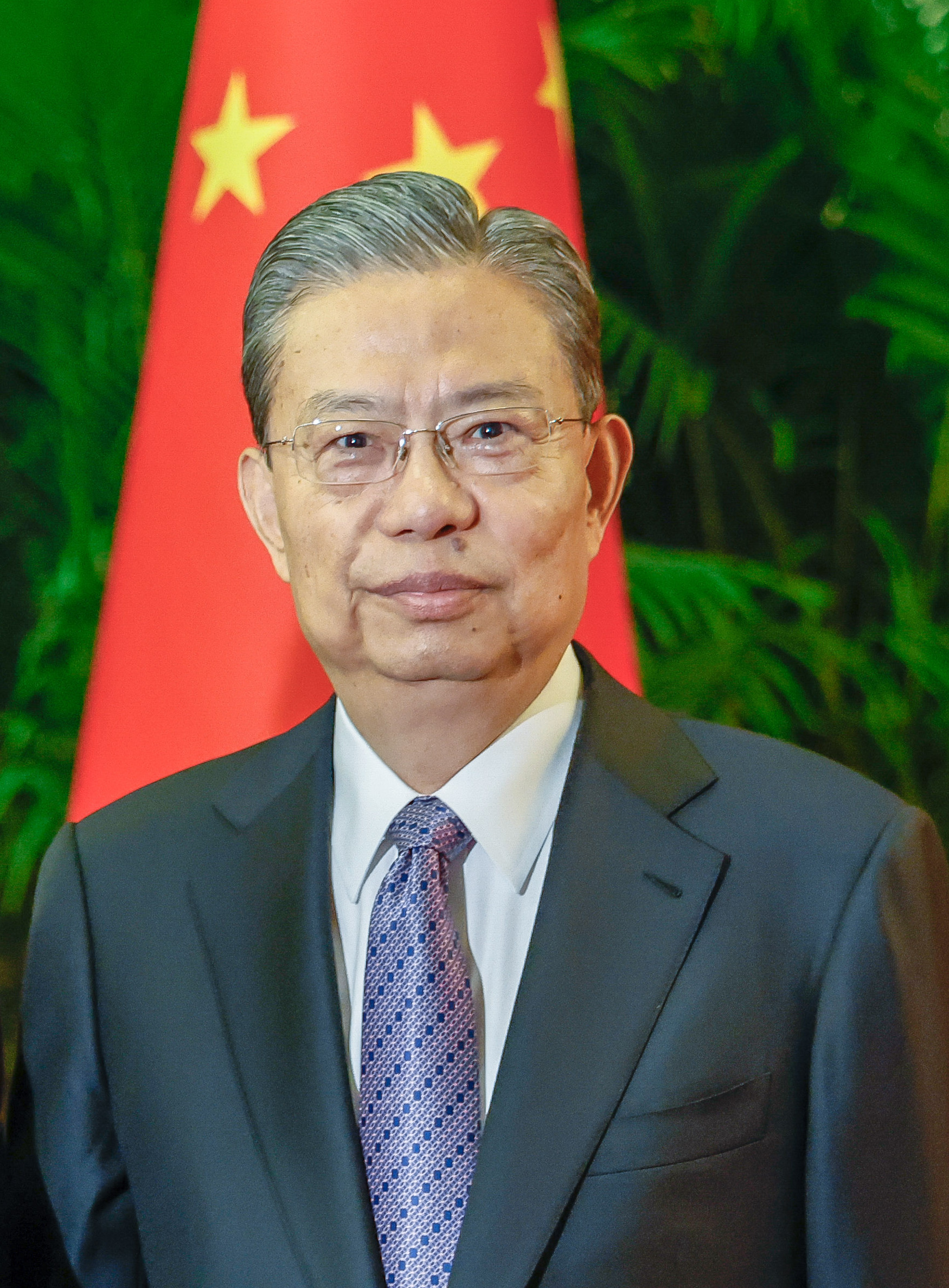
- Incumbent; Zhao Leji since March 10, 2023
- Standing Committee of the National People's Congress
- Type: Presiding officer
- Status: National-level official
- Member of: Council of Chairpersons
- Nominator: Presidium of the National People's Congress
- Appointer: National People's Congress
- Term length: 5 years, renewable once consecutively
- Constituting instrument: Constitution of China
- Formation: 27 September 1954; 71 years ago
- First holder: Liu Shaoqi
- Deputy: Vice Chairpersons; Secretary-General
- Salary: CN¥150,000 per annum est. (2015)
- Website: www.npc.gov.cn

Chairman of the Standing Committee of the National People's Congress
- Simplified Chinese: 全国人民代表大会常务委员会委员长
- Traditional Chinese: 全國人民代表大會常務委員會委員長
Transcriptions
Standard Mandarin
- Hanyu Pinyin: Quánguó Rénmín Dàibiǎo Dàhuì Chángwù Wěiyuánhuì Wěiyuánzhǎng

Officially abbreviated as
- Simplified Chinese: 全国人大常委会委员长
- Traditional Chinese: 全國人大常委會委員長
Transcriptions
Standard Mandarin
- Hanyu Pinyin: Quánguó Réndà Chángwěihuì Wěiyuánzhǎng

The chairman of the Standing Committee of the National People's Congress is the presiding officer of the Standing Committee of the National People's Congress (NPCSC), which is the permanent body of the National People's Congress (NPC), the supreme state organ of power of the People's Republic of China.

The chairman is formally nominated by the Presidium of the NPC during a session and approved by the delegations of the NPC, though in reality is chosen within the ruling Chinese Communist Party (CCP). The chairman presides over the work of the NPCSC and convenes and presides over its meetings. The chairman is assisted by the vice chairpersons and secretary-general of the NPCSC, who together makeup the Council of Chairpersons. A vice chairperson may be delegated to exercise some of the chairman's powers by the chairman. In the case that the chairman becomes incapacitated, NPCSC temporarily elects one of the vice chairpersons until the chairman is able to resume their work or a new chairman is elected by the NPC. The position holds reserve constitutional powers under the 1982 revision of the Constitution of China. As stipulated in Article 84 of the Constitution, should both the president and vice president become incapacitated, and the National People's Congress is unable to elect a timely replacement, the chairman of the NPCSC will act as president. The chairman leads the Leading Party Members Group of the NPCSC, which is responsible for the implementation of CCP Central Committee policies in the NPCSC.

From 1998 to 2013, the position was ranked second in the hierarchy of the Politburo Standing Committee of the CCP, since Li Peng was barred from seeking a third term as premier in 1998. In the political order of precedence, the chairman ranks below the CCP general secretary (paramount leader) and president (state representative). The ranking of this position is not necessarily reflective of its actual power, which varies depending on the officeholder. The incumbent chairman is Zhao Leji, who is the third-ranking member of the Politburo Standing Committee.

== History ==
During the drafting of the PRC constitution, there were debates on which title to use for the head of the NPC Standing Committee. On 23 March 1954, at the first meeting of the Constitution Drafting Committee, the Central Committee of the CCP put forward a draft that used the title "speaker" (议长). During the draft discussion, there were various discussions on whether to use "speaker" or "chairman" (委员长) for the title of the post. Those who used the "chairman" title argued that it would be unpopular as Chiang Kai-shek also used that title, while those supporting it saw no issue. There were also ones proposing the use of "chairman" (主席), similar to the chairman of the Presidium of the Supreme Soviet, but others argued against this by saying the title was the same as the chairman of the People's Republic of China, meaning that the masses could easily confuse them. During the discussion Tian Jiaying, the deputy secretary-general of the Constitution Drafting Committee, said that the NPC is an organ of power rather than just a deliberative organ, and that the "speaker" title is not commensurate with its nature. Eventually, the word "chairman" (委员长) was adopted.

The office came into existence with the adoption of the 1954 Constitution, with Liu Shaoqi becoming its first holder. Liu held the office until 1959, when he was elected as state chairman; Zhu De succeeded him as NPCSC chairman From 1975 to 1983, the chairman of the Standing Committee served as state representative of the People's Republic of China, as the presidency had been written out of the 1975 Constitution and was also excluded from the 1978 draft; the presidency was restored in 1982. When Zhu De died in 1976, the office fell vacant. During this period, vice chairperson Soong Ching-ling exercised the powers of the chairman. In 1978, Ye Jianying was elected as the chairman. He served in the office until 1983, when Peng Zhen was elected as chairman. In 1988, Wan Li succeeded Peng Zhen. Theoretically, during the 1989 Tiananmen Square protests, Wan Li had the power to call an emergency session of the NPC to resolve the issue constitutionally. However, Wan's freedom of movement was restricted, and he was ultimately rendered powerless in the situation.

Between 1993 and 1998, the office was held by Qiao Shi, who was the third-ranking member of the Politburo Standing Committee. Qiao tried to get rid off the NPC's "rubber stamp" reputation and turn it into an institution with real power in establishing the rule of law. On 16 March 1998, Li Peng was elected the chairman of the NPCSC, replacing Qiao Shi. However, he was elected with less than 90% of the vote, with around three hundred delegates not backing him, despite the fact that he was the only candidate. Under Li, the NPCSC chair was the second-ranking member of the Politburo Standing Committee just after the CCP General Secretary, which continued under Wu Bangguo, who held the office from 2003 to 2013. In 2013, the political importance of the office decreased when Zhang Dejiang became the officeholder; Zhang was the third-ranking member of the Politburo Standing Committee behind the CCP General Secretary and the Premier. In 2018, Li Zhanshu, the third-ranking member of the 19th PSC, was elected as the chairman. In 2023, Zhao Leji, the third-ranking member of the 20th PSC, was elected as the chairman.

== List of chairpersons ==
Multiple terms in office, consecutive or otherwise, are listed in the Term column.

Generations of leadership

- Mao Zedong administration
- Deng Xiaoping administration
- Jiang Zemin administration
- Hu Jintao administration
- Xi Jinping administration

No.	Chairperson	Term	Term of office		Political party
No.	Chairperson	Term	Took office	Left office	Political party
1	Liu Shaoqi 刘少奇	1st	September 27, 1954	April 27, 1959	Chinese Communist Party (CCP)
2	Zhu De 朱德	2nd	April 27, 1959	January 3, 1965	Chinese Communist Party (CCP)
2	Zhu De 朱德	3rd	January 3, 1965	January 17, 1975	Chinese Communist Party (CCP)
2	Zhu De 朱德	4th	January 17, 1975	July 6, 1976	Chinese Communist Party (CCP)
Office vacant July 7, 1976–March 5, 1978 (Note: During this vacancy Soong Ching-ling performed the functions and duties of the chairperson as the first vice chairperson.)
3	Ye Jianying 叶剑英	5th	March 5, 1978	June 18, 1983	Chinese Communist Party (CCP)
4	Peng Zhen 彭真	6th	June 18, 1983	April 8, 1988	Chinese Communist Party (CCP)
5	Wan Li 万里	7th	April 8, 1988	March 27, 1993	Chinese Communist Party (CCP)
6	Qiao Shi 乔石	8th	March 27, 1993	March 16, 1998	Chinese Communist Party (CCP)
7	Li Peng 李鹏	9th	March 16, 1998	March 15, 2003	Chinese Communist Party (CCP)
8	Wu Bangguo 吴邦国	10th	March 15, 2003	March 15, 2008	Chinese Communist Party (CCP)
8	Wu Bangguo 吴邦国	11th	March 15, 2008	March 14, 2013	Chinese Communist Party (CCP)
9	Zhang Dejiang 张德江	12th	March 14, 2013	March 17, 2018	Chinese Communist Party (CCP)
10	Li Zhanshu 栗战书	13th	March 17, 2018	March 10, 2023	Chinese Communist Party (CCP)
11	Zhao Leji 赵乐际	14th	March 10, 2023	Incumbent	Chinese Communist Party (CCP)
