= General Office of the Standing Committee of the National People's Congress =

Administrative agency of the NPCSC

- 全国人民代表大会常务委员会 办公厅
- Formation: September 27, 1954
- Type: Administrative agency of the Standing Committee of the National People's Congress
- Location: Office Building of the NPC, No.1 Qianmen West Street, Xicheng District, Beijing
- Secretary-General: Liu Qi
- Deputy Secretaries-General: Liu Junchen, He Xin, Hu Xiaoli, Ouyang Changqiong, Song Rui
- Parent organization: Standing Committee of the National People's Congress

General Office of the Standing Committee of the National People's Congress
- Simplified Chinese: 全国人民代表大会常务委员会办公厅
- Traditional Chinese: 全國人民代表大會常務委員會辦公廳
Transcriptions
Standard Mandarin
- Hanyu Pinyin: Quánguó Rénmín Dàibiǎo Dàhuì Chángwù Wěiyuánhuì Bàngōngtīng

Abbreviation
- Simplified Chinese: 全国人大常委会办公厅
- Traditional Chinese: 全國人大常委會辦公廳
Transcriptions
Standard Mandarin
- Hanyu Pinyin: Quánguó Réndà Chángwěihuì Bàngōngtīng

The General Office of the Standing Committee of the National People's Congress is an administrative agency of the Standing Committee of the National People's Congress (NPCSC), which assists the NPCSC with day-to-day administrative operations. The General Office was established along with the NPC and its Standing Committee in 1954. It is headed by the Secretary-General of the NPCSC.

== History ==
The General Office of the NPCSC was established in 1954, along with the NPC and the NPCSC.

== Functions ==
The General Office of the NPCSC the administrative agency of the NPCSC. It is headed by the secretary-general, who is assisted by deputy secretaries-general.

== Organization ==
The General Office is composed of the following departments:

- Secretariat
- Research Office
- Liaison Bureau
- Foreign Affairs Bureau
- Information Bureau
- Letters and Calls Bureau
- Personnel Bureau
- Bureau of Veteran Cadres
- Institutional Affairs Administration Bureau
- Party Branch of the NPCSC
- Commission of Discipline Inspection of the NPCSC
- Trade Union of the NPCSC

The General Office also manages the following directly affiliated institutions:

- Great Hall of the People Administration Bureau
- National People's Congress Service Center
- National People's Congress Training Center
- National People's Congress Information Center
- National People's Congress Library
- National People's Congress Conference Center
- National People's Congress of China
- National People's Congress Procurement Center
