= Secretary-General of the Standing Committee of the National People's Congress =

Political office in the People's Republic of China (PRC)

- 全国人民代表大会常务委员会秘书长
- National Emblem of China

- Flag of China

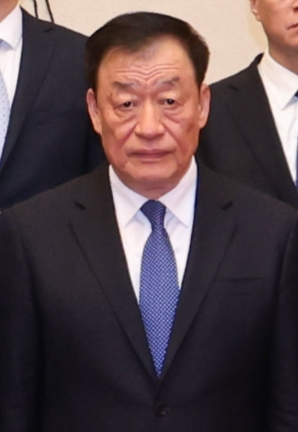
- Incumbent; Liu Qi since March 10, 2023
- General Office of the Standing Committee of the National People's Congress
- Type: Presiding officer
- Status: Provincial and ministerial-level official
- Member of: Council of Chairpersons
- Nominator: Presidium of the National People's Congress
- Appointer: National People's Congress
- Term length: 5 years, renewable once consecutively
- Constituting instrument: Constitution of China
- Formation: 27 September 1954; 71 years ago
- First holder: Peng Zhen
- Deputy: Deputy Secretary-General

The Secretary-General of the Standing Committee of the National People's Congress is a deputy to the chairman of the Standing Committee of the National People's Congress, and is responsible for assisting the chairman in his work. The secretary-general is responsible for overseeing the operations of the NPCSC General Office.

The secretary-general is formally nominated by the Presidium of the NPC during a session and approved by the delegations of the NPC, although in practice the candidate is chosen within the ruling Chinese Communist Party (CCP). The Chairman, Vice Chairpersons, and the Secretary-General of the NPCSC collectively constitute the Council of Chairpersons. The secretary-general is responsible for the administrative operations of the General Office of the Standing Committee. The post is generally held concurrently by one of the vice chairpersons, and is assisted by one or more Deputy Secretaries-General.

== List of officeholders ==
| No. (Note: These numbers are not official.) | Term(s) | Name (birth–death) | Picture | Took office | Left Office | Tenure | Important offices held during tenure | CPPCC Chairperson | Ref. |
|---|---|---|---|---|---|---|---|---|---|
| 1 | 1st | Peng Zhen (1902–1997) | | September 27, 1954 | January 3, 1965 | 10 years, 98 days | Vice Chairman of the NPC Standing Committee | Liu Shaoqi | |
| 1 | 2nd | Peng Zhen (1902–1997) | | September 27, 1954 | January 3, 1965 | 10 years, 98 days | Vice Chairman of the NPC Standing Committee | Zhu De | |
| 2 | 3rd | Liu Ningyi (1907–1994) | | January 3, 1965 | January 17, 1975 | 10 years, 14 days | Vice Chairman of the NPC Standing Committee | Zhu De | |
| 3 | 4th | Ji Pengfei (1910–2000) | | January 17, 1975 | March 8, 1978 | 13 years, 62 days | | Zhu De | |
| 3 | 5th | Ji Pengfei (1910–2000) | | January 17, 1975 | March 8, 1978 | 13 years, 62 days | | Ye Jianying | |
| 4 | 5th | Peng Zhen (1902–1997) | | November 29, 1979 | September 10, 1980 | 306 days | Vice Chairman of the NPC Standing Committee | Ye Jianying | |
| 5 | 5th | Yang Shangkun (1907–1998) | | September 10, 1980 | June 18, 1983 | 2 years, 281 days | | Ye Jianying | |
| 6 | 6th | Wang Hanbin (born 1925) | | June 18, 1983 | April 8, 1988 | 1 year, 360 days | | Peng Zhen | |
| 7 | 7th | Peng Chong (1915–2010) | | April 8, 1988 | March 27, 1993 | 4 years, 353 days | | Wan Li | |
| 8 | 8th | Cao Zhi (1928–2020) | | March 27, 1993 | March 16, 1998 | 4 years, 354 days | | Qiao Shi | |
| 9 | 9th | He Chunlin (born 1933) | | March 16, 1998 | March 15, 2003 | 4 years, 364 days | | Li Peng | |
| 10 | 10th | Sheng Huaren (born 1935) | | March 15, 2003 | March 15, 2008 | 5 years, 0 days | Vice Chairman of the NPC Standing Committee | Wu Bangguo | |
| 11 | 11th | Li Jianguo (born 1946) | | March 15, 2008 | March 14, 2013 | 4 years, 364 days | Vice Chairman of the NPC Standing Committee | Wu Bangguo | |
| 12 | 12th | Wang Chen (born 1948) | | March 14, 2013 | March 17, 2018 | 5 years, 3 days | Vice Chairman of the NPC Standing Committee | Zhang Dejiang | |
| 13 | 13th | Yang Zhenwu (born 1954) | | March 17, 2018 | March 10, 2023 | 4 years, 358 days | | Li Zhanshu | |
| 14 | 14th | Liu Qi (born 1956) | | March 10, 2023 | Incumbent | 3 years, 181 days | | Zhao Leji | |

== See also ==
- Standing Committee of the National People's Congress
  - Chairperson
  - Vice-Chairpersons
- National Committee of the Chinese People's Political Consultative Conference
  - Secretary-General
