= Conference of Presidents (Greece) =

Institution of the Hellenic Parliament

The Conference of Presidents is a collective institution of the Hellenic Parliament. Its role is to improve the functioning of Parliament through cooperation between the Speaker of the Parliament and the Presidents of the Committees. It was introduced by the Standing Orders of 1987 and found its constitutional sanction in the Amendment of 2001.

== Organization ==
The Conference of Presidents is made up of:

- The Speaker of the Hellenic Parliament
- The Deputy Speakers of the Hellenic Parliament
- Former Speakers of Parliament (if they retain a seat)
- The Presidents of the six Standing Committees
- The President of the Special Standing Committee on Institutions and Transparency
- The Presidents of the Parliamentary Groups
- A Representative of independent MPs, in case they are five or more

The number of members of the Conference is not fixed, it fluctuates depending on the number of independent parliamentarians and Presidents of the standing Committees. It convenes regularly once a week and examines the daily agenda of the workings of the Parliament; it manages the transactions of the legislative body, it decides on the conduct of organized discussion and, generally, exercises every other responsibility assigned to it by the Constitution or the Standing Orders.
