= Combined approval voting =

Single-winner electoral system

A ballot that treats blanks as abstentions, showing support for two candidates, opposition to two candidates, and abstention from one.

Combined approval voting (CAV) is an electoral system where each voter may express approval, disapproval, or indifference toward each candidate. The winner is the candidate with the highest score, which is determined by subtracting the number of disapproval votes from the number of approval votes.

It is a cardinal system and a variant of score voting. It has also been referred to as dis&approval voting, balanced approval voting (BAV), approval with abstention option (AWAO), true weight voting (TWV1), or evaluative voting (EV) (though the latter can also be used for variants with more than 3 values.) It has also been called net approval voting (though this term has a different definition in the context of approval-based committee selection).

== Procedure ==
Ballots contain a list of candidates, with three options next to each: "approve"/"disapprove"/"abstain", "for"/"against"/"neutral", or similar. The ballot warns that blanks for a candidate are scored as "indifferent" votes. Voters express their opinion of each candidate, and the votes are summed, with support = +1 and opposition = −1. The candidate with the largest score is the winner.

It is also possible to use ballots with two options, "approve"/"disapprove" and treat blanks as abstentions.

Unlike approval voting, in which non-approval could mean either disapproval or indifference, CAV allows explicit expression of disapproval, which is hoped to increase turnout, and reduce spoiled/blank ballots and insincere votes for unviable candidates. Some jurisdictions allow a "none of the above" option to express disapproval of all candidates, but ballots that allow disapproval of specific candidates are otherwise rare.

== Example ==
Tennessee voting pattern

42% of voters	26% of voters	15% of voters	17% of voters
1. Memphis; 2. Nashville; 3. Chattanooga; 4. Knoxville	1. Nashville; 2. Chattanooga; 3. Knoxville; 4. Memphis	1. Chattanooga; 2. Knoxville; 3. Nashville; 4. Memphis	1. Knoxville; 2. Chattanooga; 3. Nashville; 4. Memphis

Suppose Tennessee is holding an election on the location of its capital. The population is split between four cities, and all the voters want the capital to be as close to them as possible. The options are:

- Memphis, large but far to the west
- Nashville, medium, near the center
- Chattanooga, small and in the east
- Knoxville, small and isolated

Suppose that 100 voters each decided to vote for or against each city such that their most-liked choice received unanimous approval, and their least-liked choice received unanimous disapproval, with the intermediate choices getting a net approval rating proportional to their relative distance.

Net approval by city
Voter from City choice	Memphis	Nashville	Chattanooga	Knoxville	Total
Memphis	42 (100% of 42)	-26 (-100% of 26)	-15 (-100% of 15)	-17 (-100% of 17)	-16
Nashville	-8 (-20% of 42)	26 (100% of 26)	3 (20% of 15)	0 (0% of 17)	21
Chattanooga	-25 (-60% of 42)	-5 (-20% of 26)	15 (100% of 15)	7 (40% of 17)	-8
Knoxville	-42 (-100% of 42)	-16 (-60% of 26)	3 (20% of 15)	17 (100% of 17)	-38

Nashville, the capital in real life, likewise wins in this example.

For comparison:

- Traditional first-past-the-post would elect Memphis (despite it being disapproved by all voters outside of Memphis) because it has the largest plurality of first-choice votes.
- Instant-runoff voting would elect Knoxville because Chattanooga's second-choice votes would place Knoxville ahead of Nashville, whose third-choice votes would place Knoxville ahead of Memphis.

City	Round 1	Round 2	Round 3
Memphis	42	42	42
Knoxville	18	32	58
Nashville	26	26	Eliminated
Chattanooga	15	Eliminated	

- In conventional approval voting, with each voter selecting their top two cities, Nashville would win because of the significant boost from Memphis residents.

In this particular case, there is no way for any single city of voters to get a better outcome through tactical voting; however, Chattanooga and Knoxville voters combined could vote strategically to make Chattanooga win, while Nashville voters could defend against that strategy by unanimously casting votes against Chattanooga. This would give Memphis an opportunity to win if more of its voters vote against Nashville.

== History ==
CAV has been independently invented many times. It was originally proposed by Dan Felsenthal in 1989. Alcantud and Laruelle gave it the name "Dis&approval voting" in 2012.

== Properties ==
As this is mathematically equivalent to 3-level score voting, it shares the same properties. For instance, it is always safe for a voter to approve their honest favorite (the favorite betrayal criterion).

While a (-1, 0, +1) scale is mathematically identical to a (0, 1, 2) scale, there are psychological differences between the two, and the introduction of negative ratings (combined with the change in scoring blanks as middle grades rather than lowest grades) changes the scores that candidates receive in each system. Studies of French voters in 2012 found that, while the highest-rated candidate was the same under either system, and the grades of "exclusive" (polarizing) candidates were relatively unchanged, there were slight increases in the scores of "inclusive" (broadly-liked) candidates, and large increases in the scores of lesser-known candidates.

Unlike other score voting scales, CAV is compatible with existing voting machines that can handle voting for/against ballot initiatives.
