= Deputies Affairs Commission =

Organization of the NPCSC

Deputies Affairs Commission of the Standing Committee of the National People's Congress
- 全国人民代表大会常务委员会 代表工作委员会
- Formation: June 28, 2023
- Type: Working committee of the Standing Committee of the National People's Congress
- Location: Office Building of the NPC, No.1 Qianmen West Street, Xicheng District, Beijing
- Director: Guo Zhenhua
- Deputy Directors: Fu Wenjie, Kong Ling
- Parent organization: Standing Committee of the National People's Congress

Deputies Affairs Commission
- Simplified Chinese: 全国人民代表大会常务委员会香港特别行政区基本法委员会
- Traditional Chinese: 全國人民代表大會常務委員會香港特別行政區基本法委員會
Transcriptions
Standard Mandarin
- Hanyu Pinyin: Quánguó Rénmín Dàibiǎo Dàhuì Chángwù Wěiyuánhuì Xiānggǎng Tèbié Xíngzhèngqū Jīběnfǎ Wěiyuánhuì

Abbreviation
- Simplified Chinese: 香港基本法委员会
- Traditional Chinese: 香港基本法委員會
Transcriptions
Standard Mandarin
- Hanyu Pinyin: Xiānggǎng Jīběnfǎ Wěiyuánhuì

The Deputies Affairs Commission of the Standing Committee of the National People's Congress is a commission of the Standing Committee of the National People's Congress (NPCSC), the permanent body of China's top legislature. Established in 2023, it is responsible for deputies affairs.

== History ==
The Deputies Affairs Commission was proposed in March 2023 as part of the plan on reforming Party and state institutions, which was approved by the National People's Congress. On 28 June 2023, then NPCSC Standing Committee voted to establish the Commission and approved its leadership.

== Functions ==
The Committee is a working committee of the NPCSC. It is responsible "deputies work". which largely involves supporting the deputies of the NPC in performing their duties. It is responsible for the allocation of seats, qualification review, and liaison services for NPC deputies. It formulates and gives guidance and coordination for systems for NPC deputies' centralized inspections, special research, and contact with the masses. It is responsible for the management of NPC deputies' proposals and suggestions, the supervision and management of NPC deputies' performance of their duties and the overall planning and management of NPC deputies' learning and training. It guides the work of provincial NPC Standing Committee deputies; and is responsible for the specific work of the NPC Standing Committee Credentials Committee.
