= Annick Laruelle =

Belgian economist

Annick Laruelle is a Belgian economist who works as a professor in the faculty of economics and business at the University of the Basque Country in Spain. Her research involves social choice, game theory, and voting systems. Beyond her main research efforts in economics and social science, she has also applied game theory to model the competition between cells in cancer.

== Education and career ==
Laruelle earned a civil engineering degree in applied mathematics from the Université catholique de Louvain in 1991. She continued at the same university for a Ph.D. in economics, completed in 1998.

After postdoctoral research at the University of Alicante from 1998 to 2000, and at the University of the Basque Country from 2000 to 2001, she worked as a Ramón y Cajal research fellow at the University of Alicante from 2001 to 2005, and as a professor of economics at the University of Caen Normandy in France from 2005 to 2008. Since 2008 she has been IKERBASQUE research professor of economic analysis at the University of the Basque Country.

== Book ==
Laruelle is the coauthor, with Federico Valenciano, of the monograph Voting and Collective Decision-Making: Bargaining and Power (Cambridge University Press, 2008).
