= Presidium of the National People's Congress =

Presiding body of the National People's Congress session

Presidium of a session of the National People's Congress
- Traditional Chinese: 全國人民代表大會會議主席團
- Simplified Chinese: 全国人民代表大会会议主席团
- Literal meaning: Presidium of the Session of the Nationwide People Representative Assembly
Transcriptions
Standard Mandarin
- Hanyu Pinyin: Quánguó Rénmín Dàibiǎo Dàhuì Huìyì Zhǔxítuán

The Presidium of the National People's Congress is the presiding body of the National People's Congress when it is in session.

== Composition ==
It is composed of 178 senior officials of the Chinese Communist Party (CCP), the state, non-Communist parties and All-China Federation of Industry and Commerce, those without party affiliation, heads of central government agencies and people's organizations, leading members of all the 35 delegations to the National People's Congress (NPC) session including those from Hong Kong, Macao, and the People's Liberation Army. The presidium is elected during a meeting preceding the sitting of a new session of the NPC, which is presided over by the outgoing Standing Committee of the NPC. In practice, the Standing Committee of the National People's Congress drafts a list of candidates, then presides over a preparatory meeting of the NPC that revises and approves the list. After the Presidium has been elected, it presides over the rest of the NPC session. Officers of the presidium include a number of standing chairmen elected at the first meeting of the presidium. Its functions are defined in the Organic Law of the NPC, but not how it is composed.

== Functions and powers ==
The presidium schedules sessions of the NPC, and decides the procedure of voting on bills and proposals. It also nominates for election by the NPC the:

- President and Vice President of China
- Chairman, Vice Chairperson, and Secretary-General of the Standing Committee of the NPC
- Chairman of the Central Military Commission
- President of the Supreme People's Court
- Procurator-General of the Supreme People's Procuratorate
