= Ding Zhongli =

Chinese geologist and politician

- 丁仲礼
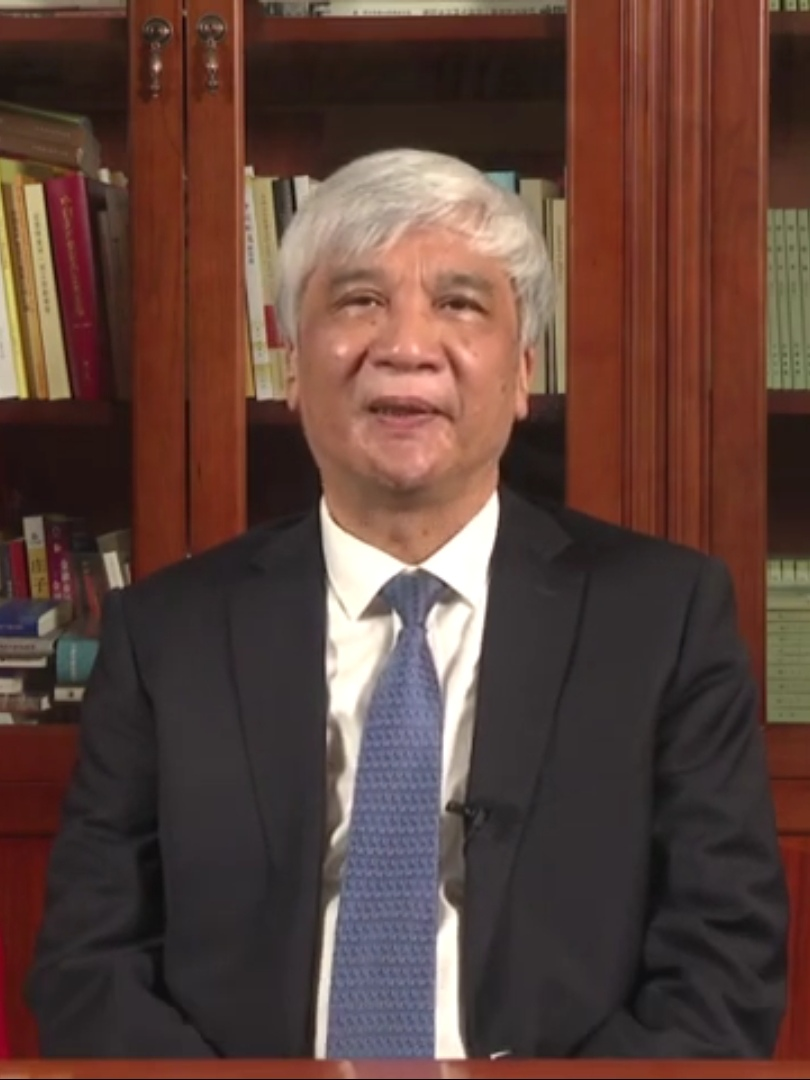

Vice Chairman of the Standing Committee of the National People's Congress
- Incumbent
- Assumed office 17 March 2018
- Chairman: Li Zhanshu; Zhao Leji

Chairman of the China Democratic League
- Incumbent
- Assumed office 10 December 2017
- Preceded by: Zhang Baowen

President of the University of the Chinese Academy of Sciences
- In office April 2014 – May 2018
- Preceded by: Bai Chunli
- Succeeded by: Li Shushen

Vice President of the Chinese Academy of Sciences
- In office January 2008 – May 2020
- President: Lu Yongxiang; Bai Chunli

President of the Western Returned Scholars Association
- Incumbent
- Assumed office January 2021
- Preceded by: Chen Zhu

Personal details
- Born: 14 January 1957 (age 69) Shengzhou, Shaoxing, Zhejiang, China
- Party: China Democratic League
- Education: Zhejiang University (BS); Institute of Geology, Chinese Academy of Sciences (MS, ScD)
- Scientific career
- Fields: Geology

Ding Zhongli (Chinese: 丁仲礼; pinyin: Dīng Zhònglǐ; born 14 January 1957) is a Chinese geologist and officeholder, who is the chairman of the China Democratic League and a vice chairman of the Standing Committee of the National People's Congress.

== Biography ==
Ding was born in Shengzhou, Zhejiang in January 1957. He received a bachelor of science with a major in geochemistry from Zhejiang University in 1982. He received a master of science and a doctor of science in paleontology and stratigraphy from the Institute of Geology, Chinese Academy of Sciences in 1982 and 1985, respectively.

Ding's research mainly focuses on the Neogene eolian sediments and ancient climate. He is the current director-general of the Institute of Geology and Geophysics, Chinese Academy of Sciences. He is also the vice president of the Chinese Society for Mineralogy, Petrology and Geochemistry.

In December 2005, Ding was elected as an academician of the Chinese Academy of Sciences. In January 2008, he was appointed the vice president of the Chinese Academy of Sciences.

In 2008, Ding became a member of the Standing Committee of the National People's Congress (NPCSC). In December 2017, Ding was elected as the chairperson of the China Democratic League, one of the minor political parties in China. In March 2018, Ding was elected as a vice chairperson of the Standing Committee of the National People's Congress.

On 7 December 2020, pursuant to Executive Order 13936, the US Department of the Treasury imposed sanctions on all 14 NPCSC vice chairpersons including Ding, for "undermining Hong Kong's autonomy and restricting the freedom of expression or assembly."

On 10 March 2023, during the 14th National People's Congress, he was appointed Vice Chairman of the Standing Committee of the National People's Congress. On 3 June 2023, Ding attended the third inauguration of Recep Tayyip Erdoğan as Turkish president as the special envoy of Chinese president Xi Jinping.
