= Ceylon–China Trade Agreement of 1952 =

International trade agreement 1952–1982

Rubber-Rice Pact
- Type: Trade agreement
- Signed: 18 December 1952
- Ratified: Every 5 years: 1952; 1958; 1962; 1967; 1972; 1977
- Effective: 1952–1982
- Expiry: 18 December 1982
- Negotiators: R.G. Senanayake; Zhou Enlai
- Signatories: Susantha de Fonseka; Ye Jizhuang
- Parties: Dominion of Ceylon; People's Republic of China
- Language: English, Chinese

The Ceylon–China Trade Agreement of 1952, also known as the Rubber-Rice Pact, was an international trade agreement between the People's Republic of China and the Dominion of Ceylon (now known as Sri Lanka), signed on 18 December 1952 and lasting for 30 years. It proved to be the cornerstone of the early years of diplomatic relations between the two countries, establishing them as strong allies in the infancy of both nations.

Ceylon faced a shortage of rice, along with the inability to sell natural rubber to the West due to the advent of synthetic rubber. China faced a shortage of rubber, and therefore was able to exchange rice with Ceylon in exchange for it. It was one of the most successful and durable trade agreements in the world at the time, having been in operation for thirty years, and strengthening the economies of both countries.

At the same time however, it strained relations between Ceylon and the United States, as they did not want Ceylon aiding a Communist country. The United States invoked the Battle Act, which prevented it from giving military and financial aid to countries selling strategic materials to Communist countries, thus cutting off aid to Ceylon.

== Background ==
In 1952, both Ceylon and China were in their infancy as nations. The Dominion of Ceylon was formed in 1948 following its independence from being a colony of the British Empire. The People's Republic of China was declared a state in 1949 by CCP Chairman Mao Zedong following the Chinese Communist Revolution. Both countries faced economic challenges in these early years as a result of the circumstances from which they emerged.

=== Economic issues in Ceylon ===
In Ceylon, the first prime minister, D. S. Senanayake, had just suddenly died in a horse-riding accident, leaving the country in a state of disarray. Governor-General Lord Soulbury chose Dudley Senanayake to be the next prime minister.

The world market price of rice rose by 38% between 1951 and 1952, and the country faced a shortage of rice from their traditional suppliers – Burma, Thailand, and Mainland Southeast Asia. Senanayake's government was committed to provide every adult person with two measures of rice per week at a subsidized price, prompting them to buy 60,000 tons of rice from the United States, and 10,000 tons from Ecuador at high prices. The government's foreign exchange resources were limited, and the high price they were paying for imported rice increased the price for consumers, leading to the 1953 Ceylonese Hartal. The purchase of locally produced commodities by the West decreased drastically, most notably the purchase of natural rubber by the United States following the advent of synthetic rubber. This along with the end of the Korean War led to a collapse of Ceylon's export prices by 23% between 1951 and 1952. The country's top exports all declined in monetary value; natural rubber by 36%, tea by 10%, and coconut oil by 40%. Ceylon attempted to negotiate with the United States for a loan of US$50 million, and for favorable prices for rubber exports and rice imports, but failed. Ceylon found itself with a shortage of rice, and an abundance of rubber.

=== Economic issues in China ===
The Chinese government, led by the Chinese Communist Party (CCP) under CCP Chairman Mao Zedong, faced its own challenges, aiming to transform the country from a largely agrarian and war-torn society into a socialist state. When the People's Republic of China was established, it was emerging from decades of conflict, including the Chinese Civil War and World War II. The economy had been severely disrupted by these conflicts, leading to widespread destruction and dislocation. China was primarily an agrarian society, and its agricultural sector was in dire need of modernization. Land reform was initiated, redistributing properties from landlords to peasants, but this process was fraught with challenges and resistance, impacting agricultural productivity. These factors, along with the government's efforts to finance their economic programs such as the Great Leap Forward and Five-Year Plan, caused hyperinflation in the country to become an increasing concern.

The Red Scare caused the international community to be hesitant in recognizing and engaging with the newly established Communist government. China faced economic isolation and limited access to international markets and foreign aid. Before the founding of the People's Republic of China in 1949, the country relied heavily on imported rubber, primarily from Southeast Asian countries like Malaysia and Indonesia. The disruption of trade during and after World War II, along with China's unstable international relations, made it difficult to secure a consistent supply of rubber. The United Nations also passed a resolution preventing the sale of rubber to China.

== History ==
=== Proposal ===
The United Nations resolution banning the sale of rubber to China gave R. G. Senanayake, the Minister of Commerce at the time in Ceylon, the idea to trade with them. Ceylon had a surplus of natural rubber, being one of the world's top producers at the time. Senanayake presented the proposal to Parliament, noting that their requests for foreign aid via the Point Four Program resulted only in one cook being sent to the Girls' Farm School in Kundasale. He argued that Ceylon should go wherever possible to meet their requirements.

=== Opposition ===
Then Minister of Finance, J. R. Jayawardene, who later went on to become President of Sri Lanka, was the proposal's main opponent. Jayawardene, who was known to be pro-America, feared the backlash that Ceylon would face from the United States and the West, who were weary of communist China's economic rise. The cabinet also faced pressure from the Central Bank of Ceylon, which was founded and governed at the time by American economist John Exter. Local newspapers carried on a virulent press campaign against any dealings with a communist China.

R.G. Senanayake responded in Parliament stating, "I have always held the view that political ideologies should not stand in the ways of countries trading with each other if that trade is to their mutual advantage."

=== Signing ===
Prime Minister Dudley Senanayake fully backed his cousin, the Minister of Commerce R. G. Senanayake. PM Senanayake argued the benefits of the agreement, stating, "Ceylon's oil trade pattern has been knocked out by changes in the world market and we have to seek new markets for our needs of essential foodstuffs and for our exports." Rebutting the accusations that the trade agreement was opening the door to communist influences in Ceylon, he pointed out: “Communism thrives in many places not through an understanding of that particular ideology but through poverty and want. I am confident that our Trade Agreement with China will instead of opening doors to communism help us to stand firmer against it.”

An envoy from Ceylon arrived in China's capital, Beijing. The trade agreement was officially signed by both parties on 18 December 1952. The document was signed by diplomat Susantha de Fonseka representing Ceylon, and Minister of Trade Ye Jizhuang representing China. The signing was overseen by R. G. Senanayake and Chinese Premier Zhou Enlai. It became the first trade agreement signed by China with a non-communist country.

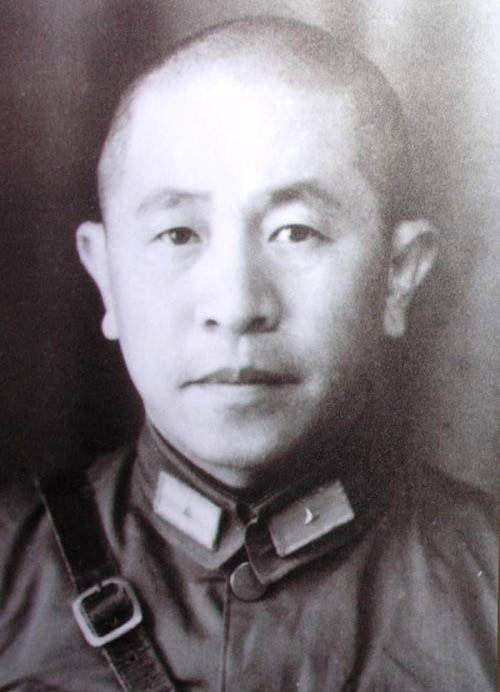
Ye Jizhuang

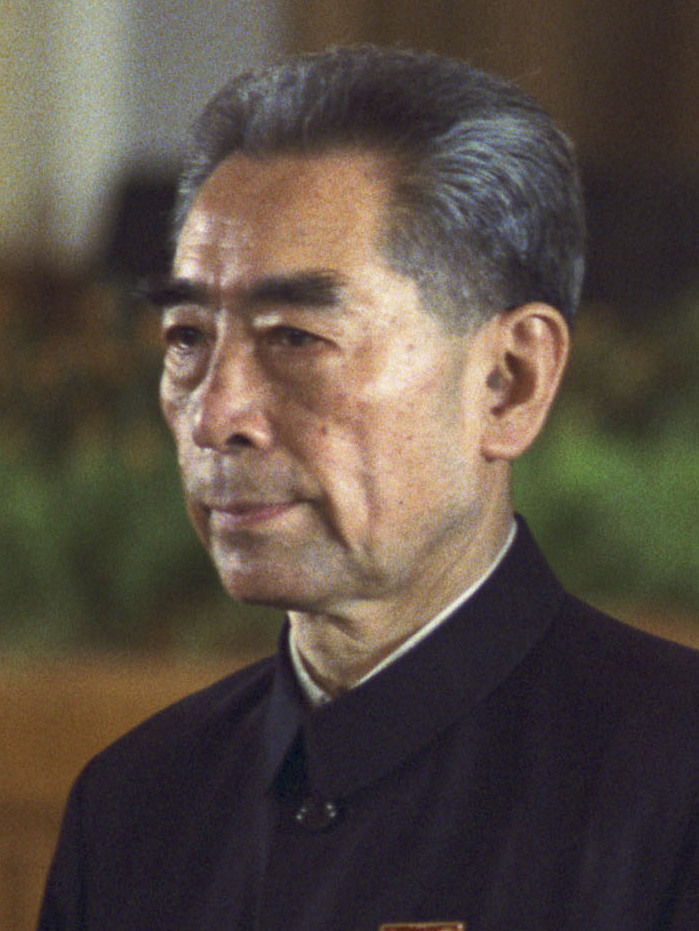
Zhou Enlai

== Implementation ==
The trade was based on bartering exports and imports to balance every year, with only the outstanding balance at the end of the year to be settled in foreign exchange. Nonetheless, trade imbalances persisted in the subsequent years, and the outstanding trade deficit was typically rolled over to the next year without resolution through foreign exchange settlements.

In 1953, Ceylon acquired 270,000 tons of rice from China, reciprocated by China's purchase of 50,000 tons of rubber. These quantities were traded at prevailing world market rates and held equal value. Moreover, China committed to offering a premium rate for rubber exceeding the global market price, and also managed the associated export costs for rubber shipments from Colombo. China paid Ceylon Rs. 1.74 per pound of rubber, whereas the average world market price was Rs. 1.05 per pound. This premium varied with every five-year agreement. The handling charge, which was fixed at five cents per pound, also varied in subsequent years. China also agreed to supply rice to Sri Lanka below market prices, at £54 or Rs. 720 per ton. Thus Sri Lanka benefited both ways from the agreement.

The second part of the agreement pertained to the trade in additional commodities that both Sri Lanka and China intended to purchase and sell. However, this part of the agreement lacked specific obligations, with the understanding that the total worth of exports and imports would be balanced on an annual basis.

== Backlash ==
American diplomat Joseph C. Satterthwaite along with Bernard Gufler of the American embassy, met with Ceylonese Minister of Home Affairs Oliver Goonetilleke to discuss the matter of Ceylon shipping rubber to China. Satterthwaite expressed concern regarding the matter and hoped that some means could be found of preventing further shipments to keep positive relations between Ceylon and the United States. Goonetilleke asserted that it was a matter of absolute political necessity for the U.S. government not to prohibit the shipment of rubber to China, or to engage in destinational control over rubber shipments leaving Ceylon. Regarding the United Nations resolution banning the sale of rubber to China, Goonetilleke stated that Ceylon was not part of the United Nations and therefore under no obligation to abide by the resolution.

The United States retaliated against Ceylon for trading with China by invoking the Battle Act, which prevented it from giving aid to countries selling strategic materials to Communist countries, thus cutting off aid to Ceylon. In addition, the United States stopped selling sulfur, which was needed by Ceylon's rubber plantations. Ceylon lost access to U.S. military aid and arms. Their decision to trade with China was seen as a challenge to U.S. foreign policy, and led to a degree of diplomatic tension between the two countries. This tension may have been the catalyst to Ceylon being a founding member of the Non-Aligned Movement.

== Dissolution ==
The original trade agreement was meant to last for five years, but was renewed by both countries a total of five times. During the 1980s both Ceylon and China shifted to a more open economic policy. By 1982, the exchange of rice and rubber had lost its appeal for Sri Lanka, as the country had achieved near self-sufficiency in rice production, requiring only minimal rice imports. On the other hand, China had the flexibility to procure rubber from multiple rubber-producing nations without constraints or additional costs.

== Legacy ==
The importance of the Ceylon–China Trade Agreement is underscored by the substantial advantages that both countries reaped throughout its three-decade existence. Ceylon's willingness to providing rubber for China at a time when other rubber-producing nations were unwilling to do so – despite opposition and the withholding of aid by the U.S. government – along with China's assistance to Ceylon, have made the two nations strong allies to this day.

When arguing in favor of the trade agreement, R. G. Senanayake stated that it would "Be unrealistic to ignore a nation of 500 million in our continent with a united and cohesive government for the first time in many centuries." As he foresaw, China has been the largest exporter in the world since 2009, and the largest trader among developing countries whose purchases and sales influence the world markets.

The trade agreement is commonly brought up as an example of strong ties between the two nations.

In January 2022, during his visit to Sri Lanka, Chinese Foreign Minister Wang Yi pledged to further develop bilateral relations between the two countries, "carrying forward the spirit of the Rubber-Rice Pact," noting that China has provided a large amount of COVID-19 vaccines and other medical supplies to Sri Lanka.

In October 2023, Sri Lankan President Ranil Wickremesinghe made a diplomatic visit to China, during which both he and CCP General Secretary Xi Jinping referenced the Rubber-Rice Pact as showing the seminal bond between both nations.
