= 1953 Ceylonese hartal =

Country-wide strike in British Ceylon

Hartal 1953
- Native name: 1953 වර්ජනය; 1953 வேலைநிறுத்தம்
- Date: 12–13 August 1953
- Location: Dominion of Ceylon
- Also known as: 53 Varjanaya
- Participants: Sri Lankan public led by Sri Lankan leftist parties
- Outcome: Portions of the country placed under Emergency Regulations; Dudley Senanayake resigned as Prime Minister; John Kotelawala succeeds as Prime Minister; The rice subsidy was partially restored
- Deaths: 21+

The Hartal 1953 (Sinhala: 1953 වර්ජනය, romanized: Varjanaya) was a country-wide demonstration of civil disobedience and strike, commonly known as a hartal, held in Ceylon (now Sri Lanka) on 12 August 1953. It was organized to protest against the policies and actions of the incumbent United National Party government. It was the first mass political action in Ceylon and the first major social crisis after independence. This event is of historical significance because it was the first people's struggle against an elected government in the country.

Led by the Lanka Sama Samaja Party (LSSP) and other leftist parties who called on the public to resist the government and demonstrate civil disobedience and strikes, the hartal was primarily a protest of the labouring class, and as such there were no exclusions based upon caste, ethnicity or religion. The protests saw much sabotage and destruction to public infrastructure, as a means of frightening and halting the government. This occurred mainly in the Western, Southern and Sabaragamuwa Provinces in addition to minor protests elsewhere in the rest of the island. The demonstrations lasted only a day with at least 10 people killed, and resulted in the resignation of Prime Minister Dudley Senanayake.

== Background ==
In 1948 Ceylon had gained independence becoming a Dominion and Don Stephen Senanayake becoming the first Prime Minister of Ceylon. In March 1952 Senanayake died which began a violent succession tussle between his son Dudley Senanayake and his nephew John Kotelawala. The Governor General at the time Lord Soulbury arbitrated in favour of the late Prime Minister's son. In the General Elections held in May later that year, Dudley Senanayake's United National Party (UNP) secured a majority in Parliament, giving him the premiership. However the Lanka Sama Samaja Party (LSSP), and others, complained about electoral irregularities and felt that those had affected it the most.

=== Economic crisis ===
The people had been accustomed to a rice subsidy, which was the staple diet of the island. Dating back from the rationing during World War II, the rice subsidy was issued against ration cards and over the 1940s had become a basis for the sustenance of the local population. The United National Party had promised in the 1952 election campaign to maintain the price of rice at 25 cents a measure. Soon after the election, the government faced a sudden economic crisis. In July 1952, the food subsidies were running at the rate of 300 million rupees, which was a third of the estimated revenue in the planned budget for the coming year. Ceylon depended heavily on rice exports and the global price of rice increased because of the Korean War. R. G. Senanayake, Minister of Trade and Commerce negotiated the Ceylon-China Rubber-Rice Pact, a barter systems which allowed Ceylon to trade its rubber for rice from the People's Republic of China without affecting its foreign reserves. The pact came into effect despite the opposition of the Finance Minister J. R. Jayewardene who was pro-United States which was engaged in bitter fighting with the People's Republic of China in the Korean War. However, it did not help the government's financial position, with its trade surplus of 345 million rupees in 1951 turning into a trade deficit of 200 million rupees in 1952.

=== Social welfare cuts and the price of rice ===
Against this backdrop, the government outlined its policy to scale back the food subsidy and Prime Minister Dudley Senanayake stated that continuing the subsidy would ruin the country during his Throne Speech on 7 July 1953. The government proposed to cut the rice subsidy, making the ration cards called the hal potha (rice book) obsolete. This effectively increased the price of rice from 25 cents to 70 cents per measure with effect from 20 July. The price of sugar increased concurrently. Other social welfare measures were also cut down to save government expenditure. From 10 July onwards, the free mid-day meal for school children was withdrawn, postal fee and railway fares were also increased.

=== Budget Day ===
The proposed cuts to social welfare measures, especially the increase in rice prices were met with strong public outcry. All political parties in the opposition agitated against these measures. J. R. Jayewardene as Finance Minister in the afternoon of 23 July 1953, presented the fifth budget to parliament. A large public gathering was organized at Galle Face Green by opposition parties, presided over by S. W. R. D. Bandaranaike, the Leader of the Opposition. Leaders of the Lanka Sama Samaja Party and the Communist Party of Ceylon made speeches condemning government policy. A segment of supporters and workers, who attended the meeting, marched towards the Parliament screaming and gesticulating, in an attempt to storm the House. The police baton charged and tear gassed the unruly crowds. Small groups left a trail of hooliganism: damaged public property, stoned buses, an indication of the nastiest to come, as the leaders called a hartal on 12 August. Shortly, a strike was called in the Colombo harbor.

== Hartal ==
=== Call to action ===
All political parties in the opposition agitated against these measures brought on by the government, but only the Lanka Sama Samaja Party (LSSP), the Viplavakari Lanka Sama Samaja Party (CP-VLSSP) United Front and the Federal Party called for resistance. The Sri Lankan leftist parties led by the LSSP called for the hartal, mobilizing the masses to resist the direct attack on their standard of living. The Sri Lanka Freedom Party (SLFP) and Ceylon Indian Congress (CIC) supported protests against the elimination of the rice subsidy, but did not support a hartal. The Communist Party of Ceylon (CPC), who gained a seat in the 1952 elections, together with their allied party the Viplavakari Lanka Sama Samaja Party (VLSSP), also gave verbal support to the idea of hartal, but there is disagreement on the degree of their involvement. The more than doubling of the cost of rice was the main reason for the organizers of the hartal.

The leftist parties took to agitating the working masses, with "factory gate meetings" and village level meetings in the rural areas. The two main private print-media of the day Times of Ceylon and the Lake House group, along with the state owned Radio Ceylon reported on pro-government and anti-hartal propaganda. The leftist countered with the publication of special hartal editions of weekly news sheets.

=== Initial events ===
12 August 1953 saw the start of planned civil disobedience, strikes and demonstrations held throughout Ceylon, launched by the main non-communal trade unions, 90% of which were controlled by the leftist parties. However participation of employees of the health sector were discouraged knowing that it could affect the patients. The main complaint was the proposed elimination of the subsidy on rice, but it also included the disenfranchisement of Tamils in the 1952 election as well as other election irregularities. (Note: The Communist parties did their best to avoid suggesting that the Ceylonese "mases" were united with Indian workers against the brown and white capitalists of the United National Party, but it was not difficult for the latter party to allege that the Communists wanted to swamp the country with Indians. Jennings, Ivor (1954) "Politics in Ceylon Since 1952" Pacific Affairs 27(4): pp. 338–352, page 341) Some commentators suggest that the hartal only occurred in one-third of the country.

On 12 August many civil disobedience acts took place in certain localities along the western and south-western coast, e.g. Maharagama, Boralesgamuwa, Gangodawila, Kirillapone, Egoda Uyana, Katukurunda, Koralawella, Waskaduwa, Karandeniya, Dompe, Akurala, Totagamuwa, Hikkaduwa, and Ragama, where there were widespread riots and extensive damage to communications and transportation facilities. Some of the damage was deliberate anti-government sabotage. In Kochchikade, police opened fire killing two persons who were preventing buses operating. In Panadura, railway wagons carrying fuel were set on fire. In Peradeniya, university students clashed with the police. San Sebastian saw police coming under attack by protesters.

Because of the disenfranchisement of Tamils, the Jaffna Peninsula in particular participated fully in the work-stoppage, although there was no noteworthy violence reported. There were also widespread demonstrations in the 24 divisions of the Western, Southern and Sabaragamuwa Provinces in which the Emergency Regulations were longest maintained. These areas consisted of Alutkuru Korale South, Meda Pattuwa, Adikari Pattuwa, Siyane Korale, Alutgam and Panawal Korales, Colombo Mudaliyars' Division, Salpiti Korale, Panadura Totamune, Kalutara Totamune, Bentota Walalawiti Korale, Wellaboda Pattu, Colombo Municipal area, and the Urban Council areas of Avissawella, Dehiwala-Mount Lavinia, Gampaha, Ja-Ela, Kolonnawa, Kotte, Wattala-Mabola-Peliyagoda, Beruwala, Kalutara, Panadura and Ambalangoda. The hartal was primarily a protest of the labouring class, and as such there were no exclusions based upon caste, ethnicity or religion, even the Roman Catholics participated, notably in the Negombo, Wennappuwa and Ragama areas.

Acts of sabotage occurred throughout the country. For instance on the railways, the rails and fish plates were removed. In Waskaduwa the rails with the sleepers were torn up for over a mile, and the telegraph posts toppled over along the whole stretch. In Totagamuwa, the wooden sleepers were set on fire which warped the rails. In numerous places telephone and telegraph wires were cut. In Egoda Uyana, the demonstrators invaded the station, captured a train and uncoupled the engine so that the train could not leave. Buses particularly those of the Gamini Bus Co. Ltd. and the High Level Road Bus Co. Ltd. were stopped, stoned and smashed by the demonstrators. The principal bus routes were blocked with trees and other barriers so that military escorts were required. Bridges had their planks removed and in a few cases were dynamited.

=== Government response ===
With major civil unrest throughout the island and appearance of breakdown of law and order, the police struggled to bring the situation under control due to the sheer numbers of the crowds and rioters. The government panicked, and the Cabinet of Ministers boarded HMS Newfoundland, a light cruiser of the Royal Navy that was in the Colombo harbour. There they had several sessions, including sessions with senior offices of the police and the armed forces. Sir Oliver Goonetilleke, Governor General in consultation with Prime Minister Senanayake placed the country under provincial emergency regulations. The armed forces were deployed to assist the police to bring the situation under control. Senanayake took ill, and Goonetilleke took command of the security forces from the Queen's House. The army began to suppress riots and hartal was eventually stopped.

The hartal was scheduled for only one day, but in some cases the crowds were so worked up that they continued until the morning of the 13th. Shaun Goonewardene held the view that there was no intent to continue the demonstrations after the 12th, while Edmund Samarakkody suggested that the demonstrators were ready to go on only if the leadership had given them a signal.

In many areas the police and demonstrators clashed and at least ten people were killed.

== Aftermath ==
=== Immediate outcome ===
Prime Minister Dudley Senanayake was badly affected by the crisis, having taken gravely ill at the height of the Hartal. He resigned as prime minister on the 12 October 1953 on health grounds, leaving politics and the public limelight. The United National Party remained in control of the government, while Colonel Sir John Kotelawala took over as prime minister. The rice subsidy was partially restored, and various foreign policy initiatives were undertaken to brighten Ceylon's image abroad, including entry into the United Nations in 1955.

The hartal would eventually shake the apparent invincibility of the UNP government which would go on to lose the 1956 elections to the Sri Lanka Freedom Party (SLFP) under S. W. R. D. Bandaranaike, who contested under the "Sinhala only" slogan. Dudley Senanayake return to politics and went on to serve as prime minister on two other occasions, for four months in 1960, and a full term from 1965 to 1970.

=== Long-term effects ===
The 1953 hartal is the central event of its history to which Sri Lanka's Old Left looks back with heroic nostalgia. For many years Hartal Day was an occasion for rousing speeches by the Left. It was an application of the classic Marxist thesis of the general strike but those who called the hartal never intended to take it beyond that stage, whereas in the Marxist playbook a general strike ought to lead to the overthrow of the government in power. But still nursing gradualist illusions of ultimately seeking parliamentary power the LSSP leaders primarily did not envisage anything like such a scenario. In retrospect it has become the traditional wisdom to say that it was not the Old Left but the SLFP which benefited from the hartal in the form of the popular upsurge of 1956 which felled the UNP and brought S. W. R. D. Bandaranaike to power as prime minister.

While those who later broke away from the LSSP have all complained in varying degrees of the LSSP's failure to mobilize after the hartal for a bigger onslaught against the state, the party's official historian Leslie Goonewardene offers this explanation: "Most important of all, it was the considered view of the LSSP (as well as we believe of the VLSSP-CP United Front) that the mass movement had reached only a stage of protest against the actions of the Government in imposing the burdens it did on the masses, and not at a stage where it was aiming at the overthrow of the Government".

Dr. Colvin R. de Silva had identified 1953 Hartal as a class struggle. The long-term effect was for politicians in Ceylon, then Sri Lanka, to recognize that the labouring classes had power, and that in turn increased the coercive effect and hence political power of trade unions.

Nearly two decades later, a leftist youth armed revolt took a SLFP government led by S. W. R. D. Bandaranaike's widow Sirima Bandaranaike, who had leftist parties in its cabinet. Ironically Bandaranaike received aid from the west and the Soviet Union to crush the insurrection with brutal force.
