= Lin Haiyun =

Chinese politician

- 林海云

Acting Minister of Foreign Trade
- In office June 1967 – July 1970
- Preceded by: Ye Jizhuang
- Succeeded by: Bai Xiangguo

Personal details
- Born: 1911 Longyan, Fujian, China
- Died: 7 January 2007 (aged 95–96) Beijing, China
- Party: Chinese Communist Party

Lin Haiyun (Chinese: 林海云; 1911 – 7 January 2007) was a Chinese politician. A long-time deputy to Ye Jizhuang, Minister of Foreign Trade, he was appointed Acting Minister of Foreign Trade in February 1965 after Ye was incapacitated by a stroke. He served in the position for five years, mostly during the chaotic Cultural Revolution. He attempted to maintain economic order, but was attacked by the Red Guards and dismissed in July 1970.

== Republic of China ==
Lin was born in 1911 in Longyan, Fujian Province. He enlisted in the Chinese Red Army in October 1932 and served in the Fujian Soviet. In October 1934, he joined the Chinese Communist Party and participated in the Chinese Red Army's Long March to Shaanbei. He studied at the Red Army University after arriving at the Shaanbei revolutionary base area.

After the Second Sino-Japanese War broke out in 1937, he served in the headquarters of the Eighth Route Army. In August 1940, he began working in the economic field, serving as a bank manager and head of the industry and commerce administration in Southern Hebei and the Jin-Ji-Lu-Yu border region. After the end of World War II in 1945, he served as general manager of the South Hebei Regional Bank, Deputy Minister of Industry and Commerce of North China People's Government, and General Manager of North China Trading Corporation.

== People's Republic of China ==
After the establishment of the People's Republic of China in 1949, Lin served in various positions in the Ministry of Trade (Ministry of Foreign Trade after 1952). In September 1954, Premier Zhou Enlai appointed Lin Director of the General Administration of Customs. He also served as a long-time deputy to Ye Jizhuang, Minister of Foreign Trade. After Ye became incapacitated by a stroke in 1964, Lin was named "permanent" Acting Minister of Foreign Trade on 7 February 1965. Ye later died in June 1967.

China descended into chaos when the Cultural Revolution erupted in May 1966, a few months before the autumn Canton Fair was scheduled to begin. Lin used his position to restrain the Red Guards and maintained order in Guangzhou to ensure the Canton Fair was not disrupted. As a result, the fair was held successfully and earned export revenues of US$480 million. However, the Ministry of Foreign Trade was later attacked and besieged by the Rebel Faction of the Red Guards as the "black headquarters" of Revisionism. Zhou Enlai sent men to rescue Lin from the attack and protected him in the Zhongnanhai compound. In July 1970, Bai Xiangguo, a military officer, was appointed Minister of Foreign Trade, and Lin disappeared from politics until his reemergence as a State Council cadre in May 1973.

After the end of the Cultural Revolution, Lin was appointed Deputy Director of the Finance and Commerce Leading Group of the State Council in December 1977, and became Executive Deputy Director after 1978.

Lin died in Beijing on 7 January 2007, at the age of 96.
