= Li Qiang (revolutionary) =

Chinese revolutionary and politician (1905–1996)

- 李强
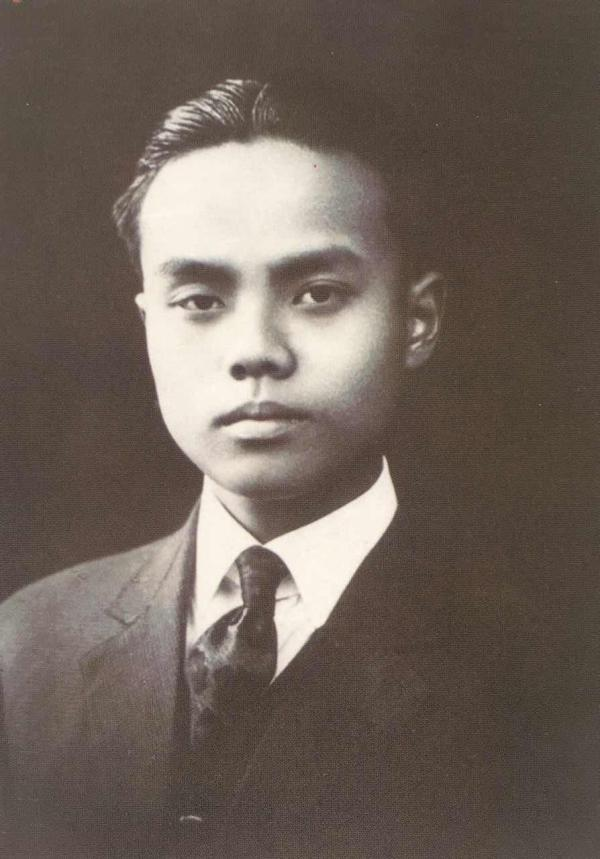
- Li in 1923

Minister of Foreign Trade
- In office October 1973 – September 1981
- Preceded by: Bai Xiangguo
- Succeeded by: Zheng Tuobin

Personal details
- Born: Zeng Peihong; 26 September 1905 Changshu, Jiangsu, Qing China
- Died: 29 September 1996 (aged 91) Beijing, People's Republic of China
- Resting place: Yushan Scenic Area, Changshu
- Party: CCP
- Spouse: Wei Huantu
- Children: 3
- Education: High school affiliated to Nanyang Railroad and Mining Speciality School

Li Qiang (Chinese: 李强; Wade–Giles: Li Ch'iang; 26 September 1905 – 29 September 1996) was a Chinese Communist revolutionary, military engineer, secret agent, radio scientist, diplomat, and politician. He served as the 2nd Minister of Foreign Trade of China from November 1973 to September 1981, and was elected an academician of the Chinese Academy of Sciences in 1955.

Born into a prominent family in Changshu, as a student in Shanghai, he joined the Chinese Communist Party (CCP) during the May Thirtieth Movement in 1925, and became a key technical specialist in the early history of the CCP. After Chiang Kai-shek's Kuomintang (KMT) massacred the Communists in 1927, Li was recruited by Zhou Enlai as the communications and transportation division head of the Central Special Operations Division (Teke), the CCP's top intelligence agency, and created the CCP's first underground radio station. After his close friend and colleague Gu Shunzhang defected to the KMT in 1931, Li was forced into exile in the Soviet Union, where he studied to become a radio expert and published a book on rhombic antenna.

During the Second Sino-Japanese War, Li established an arms industry in the CCP's rural base in Yan'an and headed the Yan'an Natural Science Institute (nowadays the Beijing Institute of Technology). During the ensuing Chinese Civil War, he continued to oversee the CCP's arms industry and established a shortwave radio station for the Xinhua News Agency. After the founding of the People's Republic of China in 1949, Li served for three decades in the Ministry of Foreign Trade. As Vice-Minister, he played a major role in providing aid to North Vietnam during the Vietnam War and secretly visited the Ho Chi Minh trail. After becoming Minister of Foreign Trade in 1973, he signed hundreds of major deals to import Western technology and machinery and helped modernize China's economy.

== Republican era ==
=== Early life and education ===
Li Qiang was born as on 26 September 1905 in Changshu, Jiangsu, Qing dynasty. Originally named Zeng Peihong (曾培洪) with the courtesy name Youfan (幼范), he was a member of the prominent Zeng clan of Changsu, said to be descended from Zengzi, a major disciple of Confucius. He studied at Zongwen School in Hangzhou, but was expelled in 1923 for writing an article criticizing Confucianist traditions. He moved to Shanghai and enrolled at the High School Affiliated to Nanyang Railroad and Mining Speciality School (南洋路矿专科学校附属中学), which used English as its language of instruction, and studied under the Kuomintang elder Ye Chucang (叶楚伧).

=== May Thirtieth Movement ===
Li became a Communist during the May Thirtieth Movement, which began when the police of the Shanghai International Settlement opened fire on Chinese protesters, killing 11. He joined the Chinese Communist Party (CCP) in August 1925 and made dynamite and grenades in July 1926 to prepare for the Third Rebellion of Shanghai Workers in support of Chiang Kai-shek's Northern Expedition from Guangzhou. He is thus considered a founder of Communist China's arms industry. In March 1927, when the Northern Expedition army took over Changshu, Li was appointed as a member of the temporary executive committee of his hometown.

=== Central Special Operations Division (Teke) ===
On 12 April 1927, Chiang Kai-shek's KMT launched a coup against his Communist allies and massacred them in Shanghai. The surviving Communists went underground and established its intelligence agency, the Central Special Operations Division (中央特别行动科; known by its Chinese abbreviation Teke), led by Zhou Enlai. Because of Li's experience in bomb-making and his familiarity with Shanghai's Green Gang, Zhou recruited him into Teke and made him head of the communications and transportation division (交通科), one of Teke's four divisions. Li developed a close friendship with his colleague Gu Shunzhang, head of the Red Squad, Teke's assassination team, and Chen Geng, head of intelligence. They worked together in the failed mission to rescue the captured Communist leader Peng Pai, but successfully assassinated Bai Xin, the turncoat who had betrayed Peng.

In 1928, Zhou resolved to establish an underground radio station in Shanghai to communicate with CCP bases in the rest of the country. Li was assigned the task because of his technical background and proficiency in English, as few Chinese books on radio technology were available at the time and radio equipment was strictly controlled by the KMT. Despite having no prior knowledge about radios, he taught himself by reading English books and studying telegraph transmitters. He successfully made a radio transmitter in 1929 and established the CCP's first underground radio station later that year. He then went to Hong Kong to establish a radio station in the British colony. When Deng Xiaoping transited in Hong Kong on his way to lead the Baise Uprising in Guangxi, Li co-ordinated with him to facilitate communication between Guangxi and the CCP leadership in Shanghai.

=== Exile in the Soviet Union ===
In April 1931, Gu Shunzhang, the head of the Red Squad, defected after he was captured by the KMT in Wuhan. Thanks to the quick reactions of Qian Zhuangfei and Li Kenong, Teke's moles in the KMT intelligence organization, the CCP leadership in Shanghai was able to evacuate before the arrival of KMT agents. As Gu was intimately familiar with Li Qiang's life, Zhou Enlai arranged to have Li leave for the Soviet Union.

In Moscow, Li planned to study at the Communist University of the Toilers of the East, which was attended by many CCP leaders, including Liu Shaoqi, Luo Yinong, and Ren Bishi. However, Wang Ming, the CCP leader in Moscow, deeply distrusted Li because of his close relationship with Gu Shunzhang. He kept Li out of the university and prevented him from returning to China. Li instead joined the Communication Science Research Institute and devoted his next six years studying radio theory and technology. He published a book on rhombic antenna in English, and was recognized as one of the top radio experts in the Soviet Union. The book was later translated into Chinese and used as a textbook in Chinese universities.

=== Second Sino-Japanese War and Chinese Civil War ===
After the beginning of the Second Sino-Japanese War, Li was granted permission to return to China at the end of 1937, as his technical expertise was urgently needed by the Communist headquarters in Yan'an. He was appointed head of the Bureau of Military Industry, tasked with establishing an arms industry in rural Yan'an. In 1939, the Bureau of Military Industry created the CCP's first self-made rifle, a Type 79 rifle. By 1943, the bureau had manufactured nearly 10,000 rifles, 1,500 grenade launchers and many other weapons. During the Yan'an Rectification Movement, Li protected top technical experts such as Shen Hong and Qian Zhiguang from persecution. In May 1944, he was appointed President of Yan'an Natural Science Institute, the CCP's first technical university, and reformed its curriculum to serve industrial and agricultural production.

During the Chinese Civil War, Li oversaw arms production in Communist-controlled areas. He also established a shortwave radio station for the Xinhua News Agency to broadcast messages from the CCP leadership.

== People's Republic of China ==
=== From 1949 to the Cultural Revolution ===
After the establishment of the People's Republic of China in 1949, Li was appointed Director of the General Administration of Radio and the General Administration of Telecommunications. Because of his technical expertise and proficiency in Russian, in August 1952 Mao Zedong appointed Li as Deputy Minister of Foreign Trade and Commercial Counselor at the Chinese embassy in Moscow. He was elected as a member of the Chinese Academy of Sciences in 1955. From April 1956 to October 1958, he served concurrently as a member of the Aviation Industry Committee of the Ministry of National Defense. In March 1961, he was appointed vice-chairman of the Commission of Foreign Economic Relations (later Ministry of Foreign Economic Relations). He also held positions in the China Electronics Society and the Electronics Research Institute.

=== Vietnam War ===
During the Cultural Revolution, Premier Zhou Enlai protected Li Qiang by assigning a high-ranking People's Liberation Army officer to his office and appointing another soldier as his secretary. During the Vietnam War, Li was a key member of the CCP's leading group overseeing China's aid to North Vietnam, which was crucial to its victory against the United States. In late 1970, he secretly visited the Ho Chi Minh trail to inspect the transport route of North Vietnamese troops to South Vietnam. In 1972, Li informed North Vietnam that China agreed to supply and ship critical weaponry and ammunition they requested for fighting in South Vietnam. Li's role in the Vietnam War helped shield him from attacks by the Red Guards.

=== Minister of Foreign Trade ===
In October 1973, Li was promoted to Minister of Foreign Trade, replacing Bai Xiangguo, who had been dismissed. MFT was a large, important ministry with many layers of organization, which served not only commercial, but also diplomatic functions. Li was appointed partly because China became interested in importing Western technology. Yao Yilin, who later became a vice-premier and Politburo member, served as his deputy.

Li's eight-year tenure as Minister of Foreign Trade witnessed the improvement of China's foreign relations with the West. By October 1977, he had signed 197 deals to import technology and machinery from many Western countries, which greatly helped modernize China's industry, agriculture, and national defence. After the fall of the Gang of Four, he politically rehabilitated more than 2,000 people in his ministry who had been denounced and persecuted during the Cultural Revolution. Li retired in September 1981, although he continued to hold many honorary positions afterwards.

Li was a member of the 9th, 10th, and 11th Central Committee of the Chinese Communist Party, and of the 12th Central Advisory Commission. He was also a member of the 3rd, 4th, and 5th National People's Congress.

== Personal life ==
Li was married to Wei Huantu (魏环图). They had two sons, Li Yanming (李延明) and Li Xiaoqiang (李小强), and a daughter, Li Xiaotu (李小图).

Li was diagnosed with liver cancer in 1991. He died in Beijing on 29 September 1996, three days after his 91st birthday. He was buried in the Yushan Scenic Area in his hometown Changshu.
