= Gao Hucheng =

Chinese politician and business executive

- 高虎城
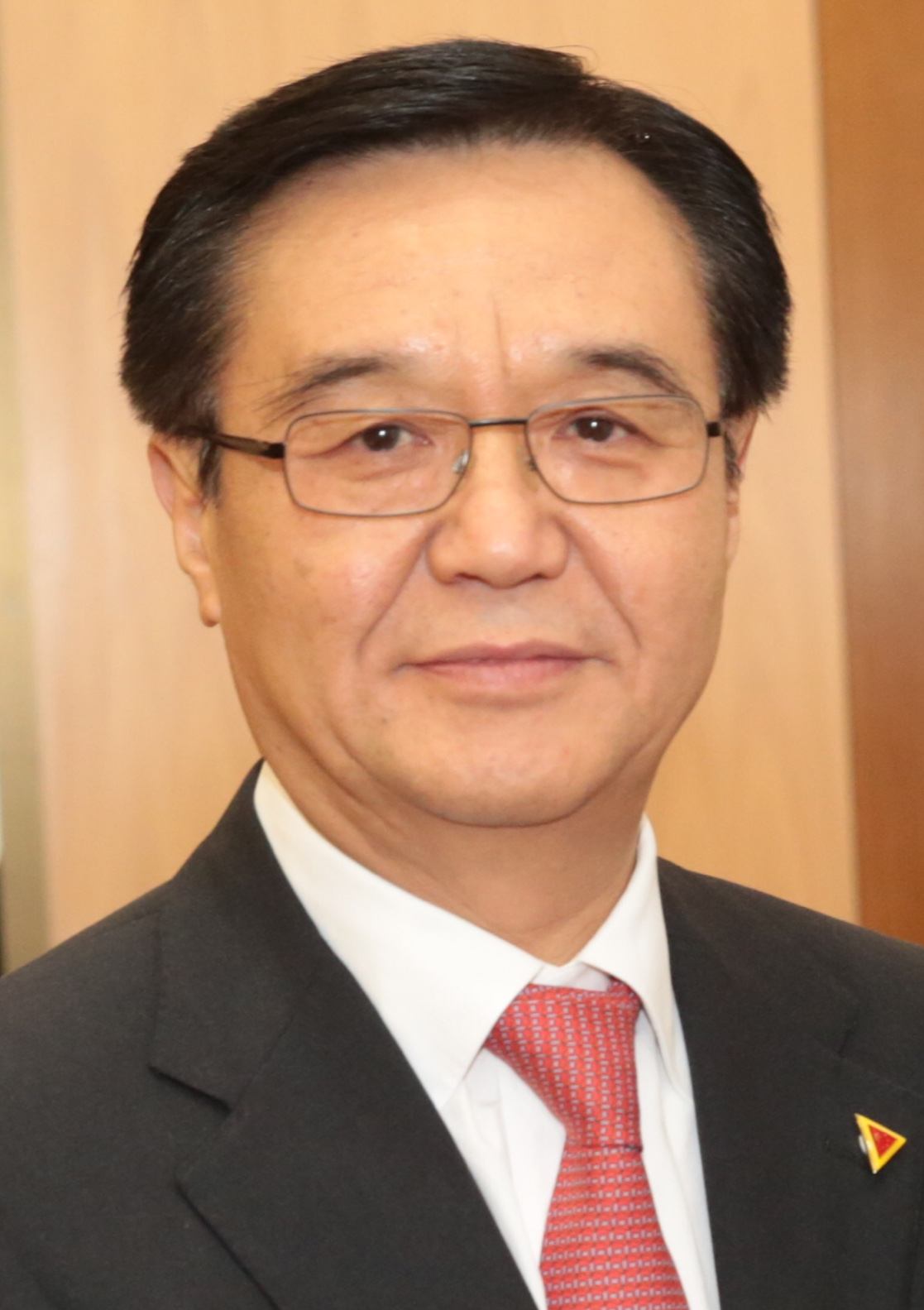
- Gao in 2015

Chairperson of the Environmental Protection and Resources Conservation Committee of the National People's Congress
- In office March 2018 – March 2023
- Chairman: Li Zhanshu
- Preceded by: Lu Hao
- Succeeded by: Lu Xinshe

Minister of Commerce
- In office 16 March 2013 – 24 February 2017
- Premier: Li Keqiang
- Preceded by: Chen Deming
- Succeeded by: Zhong Shan

Personal details
- Born: August 1951 (age 75) Shuo County, Shanxi, China
- Party: Chinese Communist Party
- Education: Beijing Second Foreign Languages Institute; National University of Zaire; University of Paris VII

Gao Hucheng (Chinese: 高虎城; born August 1951) is a retired Chinese politician and business executive. Between 2013 and 2017, he served as the Commerce Minister of the People's Republic of China. Previously, he was Vice Minister of Commerce and Vice Chairman of Guangxi Zhuang Autonomous Region. Gao holds a doctoral degree in sociology from the University of Paris VII and is fluent in French.

== Career ==
=== Education and industry ===
Gao was born in Shuo County (now Shuozhou city), Shanxi province in August 1951. At age 17, he was sent to work at a village in Hebei province, and later at a cement factory in Datong, Shanxi.

In 1972, Gao was chosen to study French at the Beijing Second Foreign Languages Institute, and in 1975 he went abroad to study at the National University of Zaire in Kinshasa, capital of Zaire (now known as Democratic Republic of Congo). From 1977 to 1980, Gao worked for the Chinese embassy in Zaire as a commercial officer.

In 1980, Gao Hucheng joined China National Machinery and Equipment Import and Export Corporation (CNMEIEC), and two years later was appointed deputy general manager of the company's France office in Paris. He spent the next five years in France, during which time he enrolled at the University of Paris VII, earning a doctorate in sociology in 1985. In 1987, Gao joined the Chinese Communist Party. From 1989 to 1990, he was the chief of the financial department of CNMEIEC, and was from 1992 to 1994 the deputy general manager of China National Resources Corporation.

=== Government ===
In 1994, Gao was appointed head of the Planning and Finance Department of the Ministry of Foreign Trade and Economic Cooperation (MOFTEC), a predecessor of the Ministry of Commerce, and promoted to assistant minister in 1997, a job he held for the next five years.

In 2002, Gao was transferred from the central government to Guangxi Zhuang Autonomous Region, where he served as Vice Chairman (governor). Only a year later, he returned to the reorganized MOFTEC, now called Ministry of Commerce, as Vice Minister. He stayed in the position for 10 years, and concurrently served as China's International Trade Negotiation Representative from 2010 to 2013. At the 12th National People's Congress of March 2013, Gao was appointed Minister of Commerce in the cabinet of Premier Li Keqiang, replacing the outgoing minister Chen Deming. Gao left his post as Minister of Commerce in 2017.

Gao was a full member of the 18th Central Committee of the Chinese Communist Party. He was also the Chairperson of the Environment Protection and Resources Conservation Committee (EPRCC) of the 13th National People's Congress.

=== J.P. Morgan controversy ===
In 2015, the Wall Street Journal released an article which examined Gao Hucheng's interaction with J.P. Morgan in regards to employment of his son, Gao Jue (also known as Joe Gao). In a December 2006 email exchange, a recruiter at the bank says "I am more concerned that Jue did very poorly in interviews - some MDs said he was the worst BA candidate they had ever see - and we obviously had to extend him an offer."

In June 2008, Gao Hucheng had dinner with Fang Fang, a managing director at the bank, and requested that Fang find a new position for Gao Jue, as Gao Jue's job had been cut. According to Fang in an email, "During this one-on-one dinner with me, the father spent long time explaining to me why it is important for the son to find another position with JPM before July 13 because he is desperate to maintain his hard-won H1-B visa which is under JPM sponsorship and won't become valid until Oct 1, while his current employment contract will end by July 13. [...] The father indicated to me repeatedly that he is willing to go extra miles to help JPM in whatever way we think he can."

Gao Jue was given a new position within the bank after the dinner, and shortly afterwards, he sent a sexually explicit email to a human resources employee at the bank. His manager in his new role, Anil Bhalla, said "there is general consensus among the seniors in our group as well reports from people in his previous group that he is immature, irresponsible and unreliable."

Government offices
| Preceded by Chen Deming | Minister of Commerce; 2013–2017 | Succeeded by Zhong Shan |
