= Zhong Shan =

Minister of Commerce, People's Republic of China

- 钟山
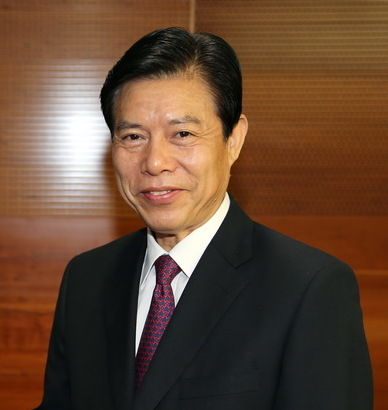

Chairperson of the Financial and Economic Affairs Committee of the National People’s Congress
- Incumbent
- Assumed office 10 March 2023
- Chairman: Zhao Leji
- Preceded by: Xu Shaoshi

Minister of Commerce
- In office 24 February 2017 – 26 December 2020
- Premier: Li Keqiang
- Preceded by: Gao Hucheng
- Succeeded by: Wang Wentao

Personal details
- Born: October 1955 (age 70) Shangyu, Zhejiang
- Party: Chinese Communist Party

Zhong Shan (Chinese: 钟山; born October 1955) is a Chinese politician and business executive, who served as the Commerce Minister of the People's Republic of China from February 2017 to December 2020. Since 2023, he is currently serving as chairman of the Financial and Economic Affairs Committee of the National People’s Congress.

As commerce minister and a protégé of Chinese leader Xi Jinping, Zhong took a prominent role in trade negotiations with the United States during the US-China trade war prior to the signing of the US-China Phase One agreement in 2020.

== Early life and career ==
Zhong Shan was born in Shangyu, Zhejiang, and he joined to work in 1972. His first job was Chief of Section in Zhejiang Textile Import & Export Corporation. In 1998, he served as the Director of Foreign Trade and Economic Cooperation Department of Zhejiang. He was served as the vice Governor of Zhejiang since 2003.

In 2008, he was appointed as the Vice Minister of Commerce. In March 2013, he was named China's International Trade Representative (minister-level).

== Minister of Commerce ==
In February 2017, Zhong was appointed as the Minister of Commerce by the Standing Committee of the National People's Congress.

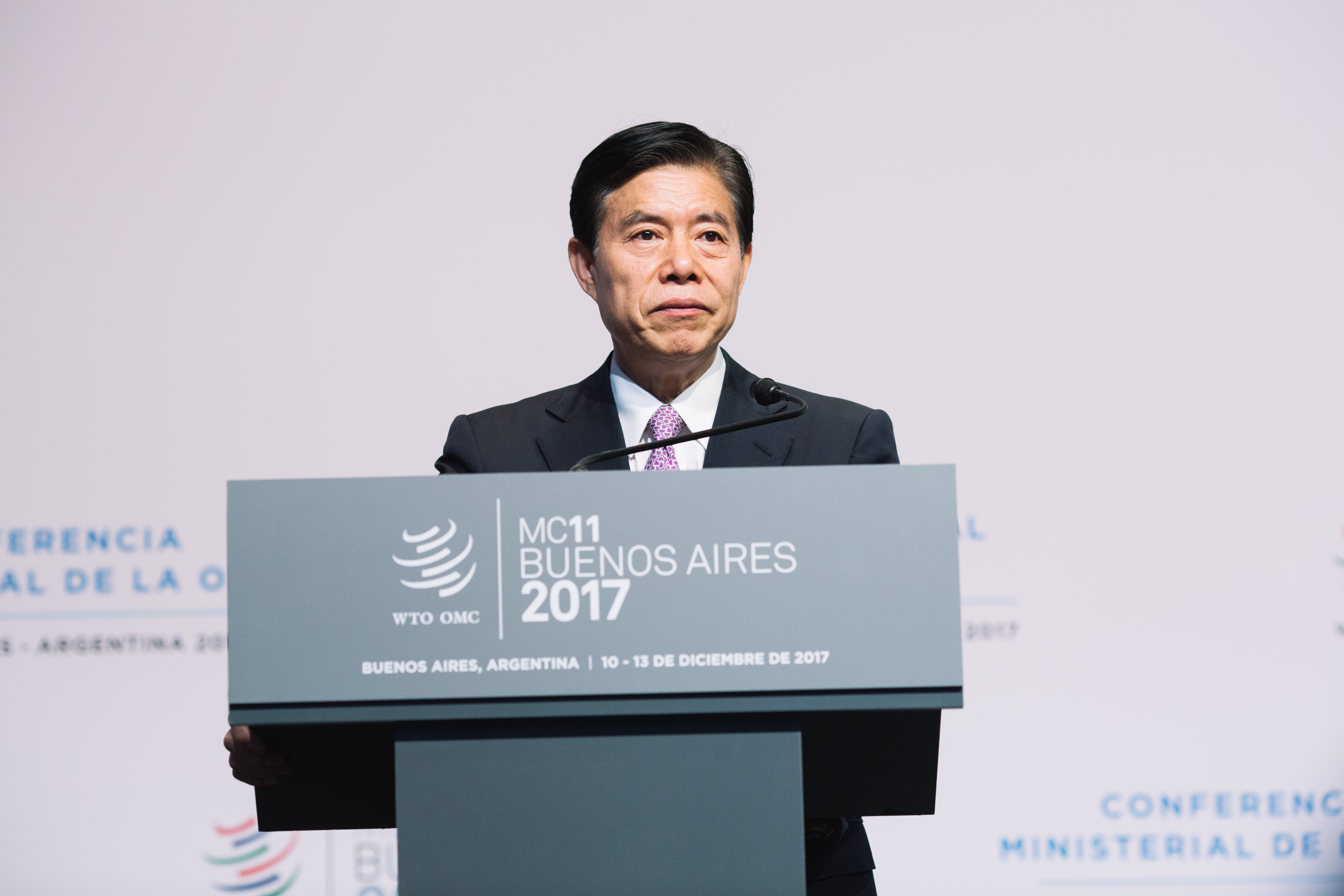
Zhong during the World Trade Organization's Eleventh Ministerial Conference (MC11) in Buenos Aires, Argentina, December 2017

=== China–United States trade war ===
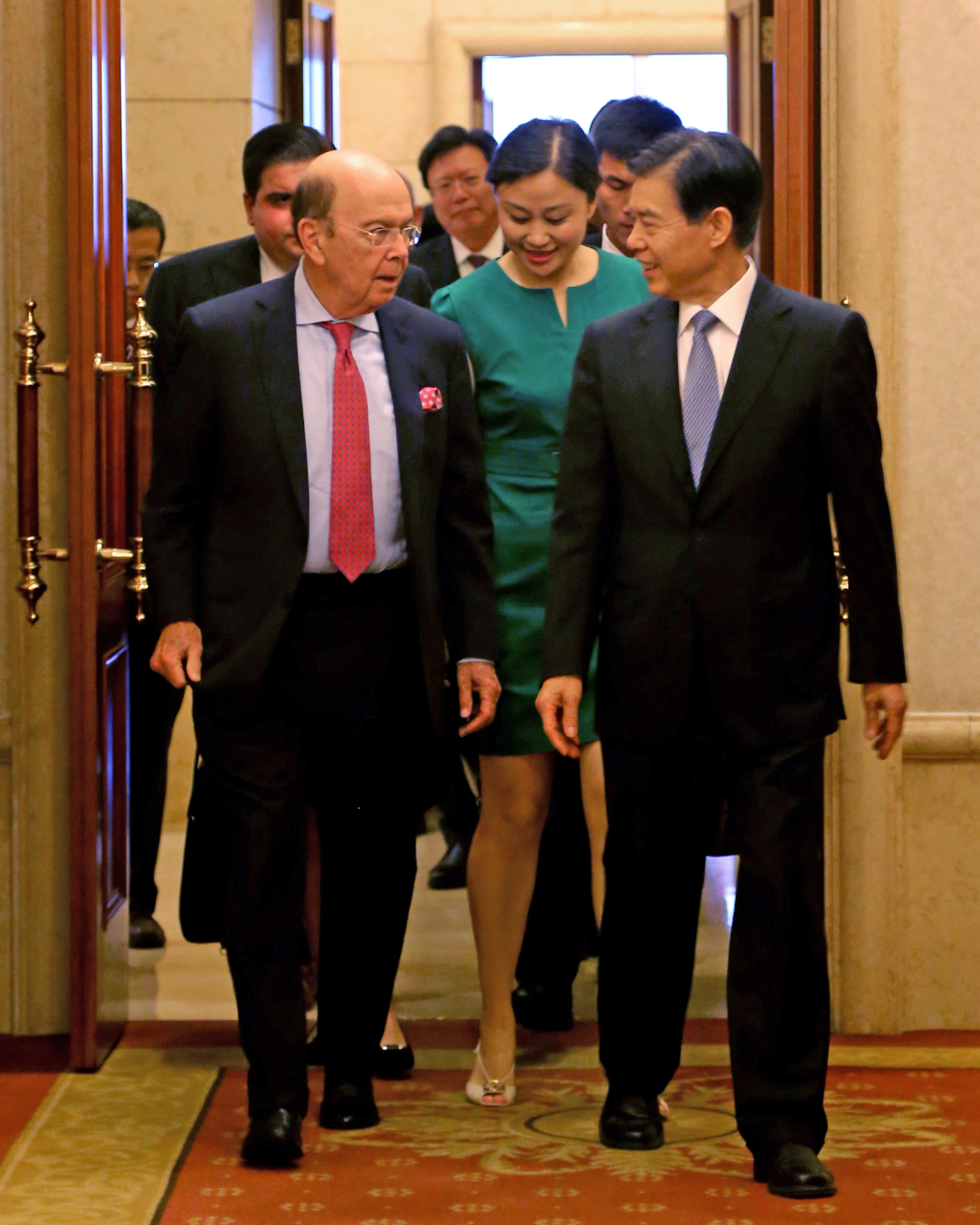
Zhong (right) with US Commerce Secretary Wilbur Ross (left)

In 2018, Zhong stated that China "does not wish to fight a trade war" with the United States but will protect its national interests against US protectionism, emphasizing there are "no winners" in a trade war. As commerce minister, Zhong joined the trade negotiations between the United States and China during the US-China trade war since 2019. According to the Washington Post, Zhong was seen as a "hardliner" by US officials, with him being described as having a strong stance in the US-China trade war. For instance, Zhong commented at the People's Daily in July 2019 that the US has "provoked economic and trade frictions against us and violated the principles of the WTO." Amid growing concerns about US-China decoupling and COVID-19 pandemic disruptions, he believed that China has strong appeal for foreign investors due to its abundant, high-quality labor and complete industrial support.

Zhong was one of the individuals that accompanied Chinese leader Xi Jinping during meetings with US President Donald Trump at Buenos Aires in 2018 and Osaka in 2019. He was with Vice Premier Liu He to witness the signing of the first trade deal with the US President Donald Trump in January 2020. In December 2020, he was replaced by Wang Wentao.

== Later career ==
In 2021, Zhong became a member of the national committee of the Chinese People’s Political Consultative Conference. From 2021 to 2023, he was deputy director of CPPCC's economic committee. On March 10, 2023, he was appointed as chairman of the Financial and Economic Affairs Committee of the National People's Congress (NPC).

Government offices
Preceded by Gao Hucheng	Minister of Commerce; 2017–2020	Succeeded by Wang Wentao
