= Zheng Tuobin =

Chinese politician

- 郑拓彬
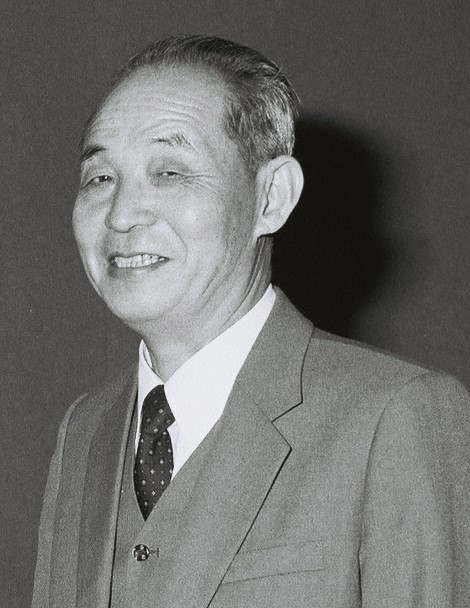
- Zheng in 1985

Minister of Foreign Trade
- In office September 1981 – March 1982
- Preceded by: Li Qiang
- Succeeded by: Chen Muhua (as Minister of Foreign Economic Relations and Trade)

Minister of Foreign Economic Relations and Trade
- In office March 1985 – December 1990
- Preceded by: Chen Muhua
- Succeeded by: Li Lanqing

Personal details
- Born: 24 February 1924 (age 101) Chengcheng County, Shaanxi, China
- Party: Chinese Communist Party

Zheng Tuobin (Chinese: 郑拓彬; Wade–Giles: Cheng T'o-pin; born 24 February 1924) is a Chinese retired politician. He served as Minister of Foreign Trade (1981–1982), Deputy Minister of Foreign Economic Relations and Trade (1982–1985), and Minister of Foreign Economic Relations and Trade (1985–1990).

== Biography ==
Zheng was born 24 February 1924 in Liujiawa Township, Chengcheng County, Shaanxi Province. He joined the Chinese Communist Party (CCP) in 1938 and worked as a middle school teacher and head of Yan'an Tobacco Factory in the CCP's Yan'an revolutionary base area. After the founding of the People's Republic of China, Zheng was transferred to work in the Ministry of Trade. From 1958 to 1964, he served as Commercial Counselor at the Chinese embassy in the Soviet Union. He was impacted by the Cultural Revolution and sent to perform manual labour at a May Seventh Cadre School from 1966 to 1971. In 1973, he was appointed Director of the Third Bureau of the Ministry of Foreign Trade. After the end of the Cultural Revolution in 1976, Zheng joined the Central Working Group in Shanghai to participate in the purging of Gang of Four remnants. He became Deputy Minister of Foreign Trade in 1977 and was promoted to Minister in September 1981. In March 1982, the Ministry of Foreign Trade merged with the Ministry of Foreign Economic Liaison, headed by Chen Muhua, to form the new Ministry of Foreign Economic Relations. Chen became head of the new ministry, while Zheng the First Vice-Minister. On 21 March 1985, Zheng was promoted to Minister when Chen was appointed President of the People's Bank of China. In the aftermath of the 1989 Tiananmen Square protests and massacre, he was dismissed in December 1990 with no reason given, and was replaced by his deputy Li Lanqing. He officially retired in 1992. Zheng was a member of the 12th and 13th Central Committee of the Chinese Communist Party.

He turned 100 on 24 February 2024.
