= Lü Fuyuan =

Chinese politician

- 吕福源

Minister of Commerce
- In office 17 March 2003 – 29 February 2004
- Prime Minister: Wen Jiabao
- Preceded by: Position established
- Succeeded by: Bo Xilai

Personal details
- Born: October 1945 Suihua, Heilongjiang, China
- Died: 18 May 2004 (aged 58) Beijing, China
- Party: Chinese Communist Party

Lü Fuyuan (Chinese: 吕福源; pinyin: Lǚ Fúyuán) (October 1945 – 18 May 2004) was the first minister of the Ministry of Commerce of the People's Republic of China.

== Biography ==
After graduating from Jilin University with a degree in Physics, Lü worked for several years in the First Automotive Works in Changchun, and then studied at the Université de Montréal in Canada during 1981 and 1983; but later, he refused the offer to stay in Canada.

When Lü went backed to China, the Chinese Embassy to Canada then suggested the First Automotive Works to invite Lü joined the Chinese Communist Party in 1983. Soon, Lü was promoted to the Deputy Executive Officer of First Automotive Works and the Chief Economist Officer, in charging operations and trades. He was also awarded by the Central Military Commission because of his contribution to the 35th National Day Parade of People's Republic of China in 1984.

Six years later, Lü joined the Ministry of Machine Industry of China, as the Department Head of automobile Industry; and then was promoted to the Deputy Minister of Machine Industry. During the eight years in office, he had made tremendous contribution to China's Automobile Industry, and personally involved in a number of projects. He also invited Wan Gang, a Chinese expert on automobiles who at that time was working with German Audi Corporation, to return to China.

Since 1998, Lü was assigned to be the Deputy Minister in Ministry of Education, and then Foreign Trade and Economic Co-operation.

In March 2003, the former Ministry of Foreign Trade and Economic Co-operation (MOFTEC) went through a reorganization and was renamed as Ministry of Commerce. Lü was promoted to be the first Minister of Commerce. However, after less than one year in the office, Lü resigned on 29 February 2004 due to liver cancer and died three months later.

Government offices
Preceded by None	Minister of Commerce; March 2003 – February 2004	Succeeded by Bo Xilai
