= Dambadeniya Electoral District =

Electoral district of Sri Lanka

Dambadeniya electoral district was an electoral district of Sri Lanka between August 1947 and February 1989. The district was named after the city of Dambadeniya in Kurunegala District, North Western Province. The 1978 Constitution of Sri Lanka introduced the proportional representation electoral system for electing members of Parliament. The existing 160 mainly single-member electoral districts were replaced with 22 multi-member electoral districts. Dambadeniya electoral district was replaced by the Kurunegala multi-member electoral district at the 1989 general elections, the first under the proportional representation system.

== Members of Parliament ==
Key

Independent SLFP UNP

Election	Member	Party	Term
1947	R. G. Senanayake	United National Party	1947-1952
1952	R. G. Senanayake	United National Party	1952-1956
1956	R. G. Senanayake	United National Party	1956-1960
1960 (March)	R. G. Senanayake	United National Party	1960
1960 (July)	R. G. Senanayake	United National Party	1960-1965
1965	R. G. Senanayake	United National Party	1956-1970
1970	P. B. Wettewe	Sri Lanka Freedom Party	1970-1977
1977	Ukkubanda Wijekoon	United National Party	1977-1989

== Elections ==
=== 1947 Parliamentary general election ===
Results of the 1st parliamentary election held between 23 August 1947 and 20 September 1947:

Candidate	Party	Symbol	Votes	%
Richard Gotabhaya Senanayake	United National Party	Umbrella	11,705	76.31
R. M. P. Y. Sirivimalaratne		Elephant	3,436	22.40
Valid votes			15,141	98.72
Rejected votes			197	1.28
Total polled			15,338	100.00
Registered electors			33,314	
Turnout				46.04

=== 1952 Parliamentary general election ===
Candidate	Party	Symbol	Votes	%
Valid votes				100.00%
Rejected votes				
Total polled				
Registered electors				
Turnout				

=== 1956 Parliamentary general election ===
Candidate	Party	Symbol	Votes	%
Valid votes				100.00%
Rejected votes				
Total polled				
Registered electors				
Turnout				

=== 1960 (March) Parliamentary general election ===
Candidate	Party	Symbol	Votes	%
Valid votes				100.00%
Rejected votes				
Total polled				
Registered electors				
Turnout				

=== 1960 (July) Parliamentary general election ===
Results of the 5th parliamentary election held on 20 July 1960:

Candidate	Party	Symbol	Votes	%
R. G. Senanayake		Hand	15,331	65.67
P. B. Wettewa		Elephant	7,866	33.70
Valid votes			23,197	99.36
Rejected votes			150	0.64
Total polled			23,347	100.00
Registered electors			30,135	
Turnout				

=== 1965 Parliamentary general election ===
Results of the 6th parliamentary election held on 22 March 1965:

Candidate	Party	Symbol	Votes	%
R. G. Senanayake		Chair	16,670	52.43
P. B. Wettewe	United National Party	Elephant	14,187	44.62
G. S. Jayathubandara		Umbrella	550	1.73
R. M. P. Y. Siriwimalaratna		Clock	206	0.65
Valid votes			31,613	99.43
Rejected votes			180	0.47
Total polled			31,793	100.00
Registered electors			37,122	
Turnout				85.64

=== 1970 Parliamentary general election ===
Results of the 7th parliamentary election held on 27 May 1970:

Candidate	Party	Symbol	Votes	%
P. B. Wettewe	Sri Lanka Freedom Party	Hand	18,705	50.7
U. B. Wijekoon	United National Party	Elephant	12,191	33.0
R. G. Senanayake	Sinhala Mahajana Peramuna	Bell	6,017	16.3
Valid Votes			36,913	99.64
Rejected Votes			135	0.36
Total Polled			37,048	100
Registered electors			37,122	
Turnout				88.3

=== 1977 Parliamentary general election ===
Results of the 8th parliamentary election held on 21 July 1977:

Candidate	Party	Symbol	Votes	%
Ukkubanda Wijekoon	United National Party	Elephant	26,089	57.34
P. .B. Wettewa	Sri Lanka Freedom Party	Hand	18,232	40.07
S. B. Vaidyaratne		Star	1,071	2.35
Valid votes			45,392	99.77
Rejected votes			104	0.23
Total polled			45,496	100.00
Registered electors			50,693	
Turnout				89.75
