= Li Lanqing =

Former Vice Premier of the People's Republic of China

- 李岚清
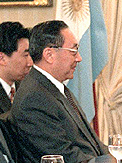
- Li Lanqing in 1997

Vice Premier of China
- In office 17 March 1998 – 6 March 2003
- Premier: Zhu Rongji

Minister of Foreign Economic Relations and Trade
- In office 1990–1993
- Preceded by: Zheng Tuobin
- Succeeded by: Wu Yi

Personal details
- Born: 22 May 1932 (age 94) Zhenjiang, Jiangsu, Republic of China
- Party: Chinese Communist Party
- Education: Fudan University

Li Lanqing (simplified Chinese: 李岚清; traditional Chinese: 李嵐清; pinyin: Lǐ Lánqīng; born 22 May 1932) is a retired Chinese politician who served as first-ranked Vice Premier of China between 1998 and 2003. He was a member of the Politburo Standing Committee of the Chinese Communist Party (CCP) between 1997 and 2002, and a regular Politburo member from 1992 to 1997.

== Biography ==
Born in Zhenjiang, Jiangsu province, he initially worked at First Automobile Works. Li graduated from the Business Management Department of Fudan University in Shanghai in 1952. Then in 1956 he was sent to study in the Soviet Union, where he worked as an intern in two Moscow-based automobile factories. In 1959, he began working as a secretary at the First Ministry of Machine Building. In 1962, he began working as a secretary at the National Economics Commission. After the Cultural Revolution began in 1966, he was sent down to perform labor at a May Seventh Cadre School. In 1972, he resumed work at Dongfeng Motor Corporation. In 1978, he took part in the planning sessions for a "Third Automobile Works". In 1981, after the reform and opening up began, Li was sent to work for the central government in Beijing, leading the Office of Foreign Government Debt at the State Foreign Investment Commission. In 1983 he was again transferred to Tianjin, where he worked under mayor Li Ruihuan as a vice mayor. Li later held positions in the First Ministry of Machine Building Industry and the State Economic Commission. Li also served as director-general of the Foreign Investment Administration of the Ministry of Foreign Economic Relations and Trade. Li was also Executive Vice Minister and then Minister of Foreign Economic Relations and Trade. Between 1997 and 2002, he was a member of the CCP Politburo Standing Committee, the pinnacle of power in Chinese politics. While in government he was the first-ranked Vice-Premier, sometimes known as "Executive Vice Premier". In his capacity as Vice Premier, Li was responsible for national education policy. He is the author of "Education for 1.3 Billion: On 10 Years of Education Reform and Development." The book has sold more than 750,000 copies in China and has been translated into English. After retiring, Li practiced calligraphy. He also attempted to get a job as a shopkeeper at a local convenience store, but was ultimately not hired after being recognized by the owner. He lately attended the 20th Party Congress at age 90.

Government offices
Preceded by Zheng Tuobin	Minister of Foreign Economic Relations and Trade; 1990–1993	Succeeded by Wu Yi
Preceded by Zhu Rongji	First-ranking Vice-Premier of the State Council; 1998–2003	Succeeded by Huang Ju
Order of precedence
Preceded by Li Ruihuan as Former Member of the Politburo Standing Committee of the Chinese Communist Party	Order of precedence of China as Former Member of the Politburo Standing Committee of the Chinese Communist Party	Succeeded by Wen Jiabao as Former Member of the Politburo Standing Committee of the Chinese Communist Party
