= Bai Xiangguo =

Chinese politician

- 白相国
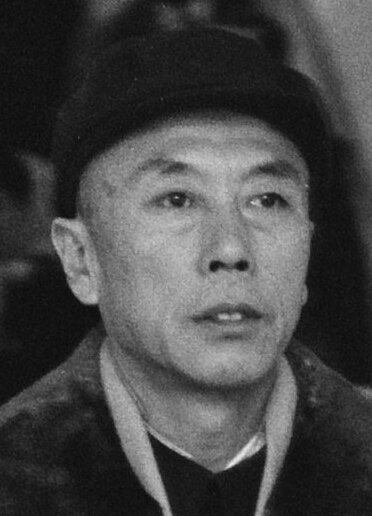
- Bai Xiangguo (1973)

Minister of Foreign Trade
- In office July 1970 – October 1973
- Preceded by: Lin Haiyun (acting)
- Succeeded by: Li Qiang

Personal details
- Born: June 1918 Penglai, Shandong, China
- Died: 7 August 1991 (aged 73) Beijing, China
- Party: Chinese Communist Party

Military service
- Allegiance: Chinese Communist Party; People's Republic of China
- Branch/service: People's Liberation Army

Bai Xiangguo (Chinese: 白相国; Wade–Giles: Pai Hsiang-kuo; June 1918 – 7 August 1991) was a Chinese military officer and politician. A career officer of the People's Liberation Army with the rank of colonel, he was sent to the Ministry of Foreign Trade to restore order after the chaos of the early Cultural Revolution, and served as Minister of Foreign Trade from July 1970 to October 1973. He visited dozens of countries in that capacity, and led the first official Chinese delegation to France in 1971 after the two countries established diplomatic relations, which was also the PRC's first minister-level delegation to visit Western Europe. He was dismissed in 1973 and returned to the military to serve as Deputy Director of the PLA General Logistics Department.

== Wartime career ==
Bai was born in June 1918 into a poor peasant family in Penglai, Shandong. During the Second Sino-Japanese War, he enlisted in the Eighth Route Army in 1937 and joined the Chinese Communist Party (CCP) in February 1938. He soon transferred to the New Fourth Army and followed commander Li Xiannian to the Henan-Hubei border region to establish a CCP revolutionary base area. From December 1942 he served in the tenth branch school of Counter-Japanese Military and Political University. In October 1944 he became deputy political commissar of a regiment. He fought in many battles in the Henan-Hubei region including Yujiadian, Zhutangdian, Xinjie, Dawushan, Pingba, and Lidian.

During the Chinese Civil War, Bai served in the Zhongyuan Military Region and fought in the famous Zhongyuan Breakout campaign in June 1946. In August 1947, his unit was reorganized into the 12th Column of the Jin-Ji-Lu-Yu Field Army and fought its way back to the Dabie Mountains region. After February 1948, he became a regimental political commissar and then director of the political department of the First Division of Hubei Military District. He participated in many battles during the People's Liberation Army's takeover of Hubei and Southwest China.

== People's Republic of China ==
After the founding of the People's Republic of China in 1949, Bai served in a series of military positions including Director of Organization of the Political Department of the Hubei Military District, Political Commissar of the 123rd Division of the 41st Army, and Deputy Director of the Political Department of the Guangzhou Military Region. He was awarded the rank of colonel in 1955.

When the Cultural Revolution began in 1966, China descended into chaos. In July 1970, Bai, until then a career military officer, was appointed as Minister of Foreign Trade to restore order to the ministry, which had been attacked by the Red Guards. During his three-year tenure, he visited dozens of countries including France, Romania, Peru, and Burma, and signed trade agreements with them. In October 1971, he led China's first official government delegation to France after the establishment of diplomatic relations between the two nations, It was also the PRC's first minister-level delegation to visit Western Europe. He was instrumental in building the new Canton Fair exhibition hall to host the enlarged trade fair in autumn 1972.

In October 1973, Bai was replaced by Li Qiang as Minister of Foreign Trade. In a meeting with an American delegation led by Henry Kissinger, Jiang Qing revealed that the reason for his dismissal was because the "handsome" Bai "failed to withstand the poisonous snake that took the form of a beautiful woman". He returned to the military and served as Deputy Director of the PLA General Logistics Department and Director of its Political Department.

Bai retired in November 1987. He died on 7 August 1991 in Beijing, at the age of 73.
