= Minister of Commerce (China) =

Minister of the People's Republic of China

Minister of Commerce of the People's Republic of China
- 中华人民共和国商务部部长
- National Emblem of China

- Flag of China

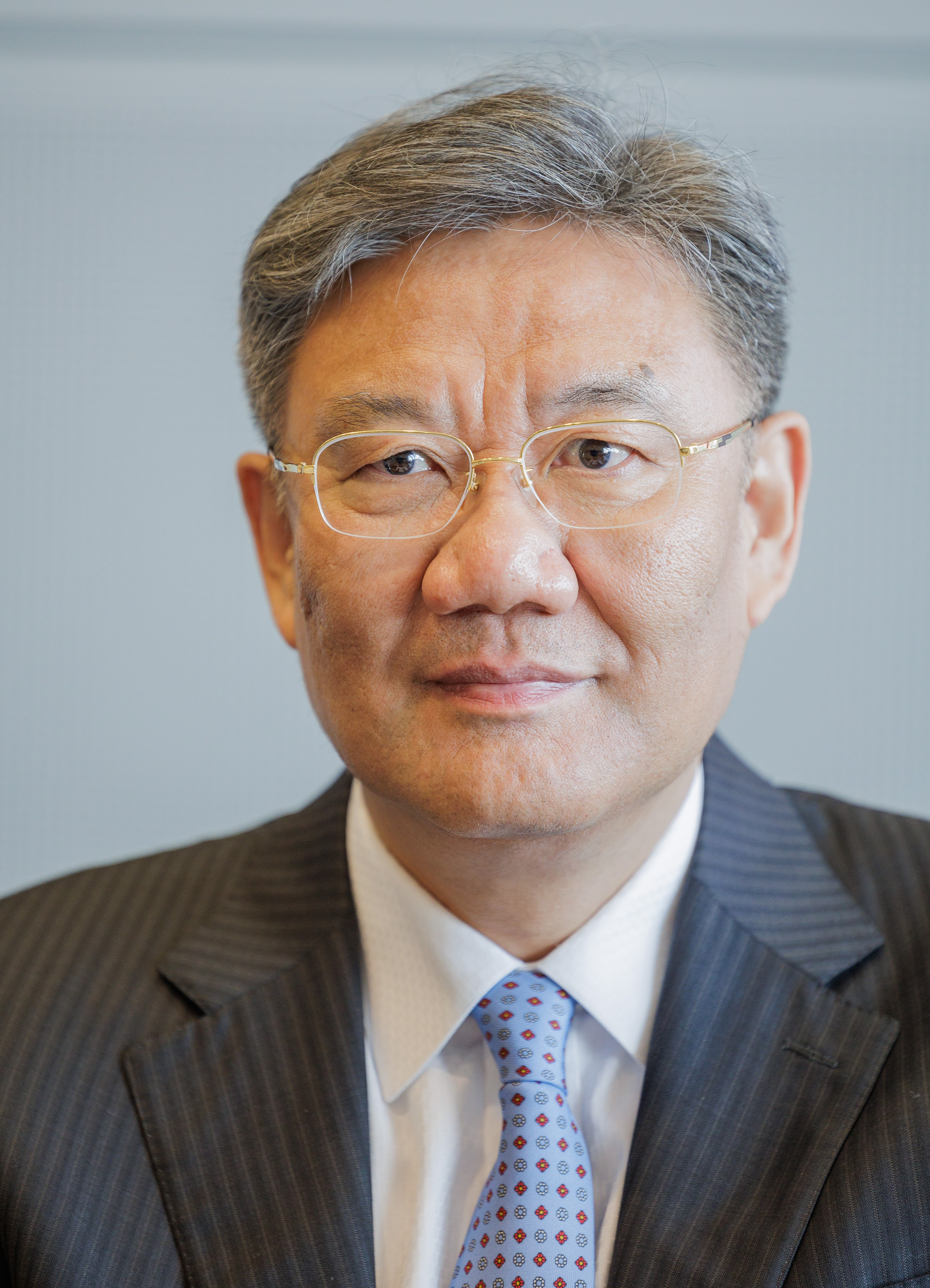
- Incumbent; Wang Wentao since 26 December 2020
- Ministry of Commerce
- Status: Provincial and ministerial-level official
- Member of: Plenary Meeting of the State Council
- Seat: Ministry of Commerce Building, Dongcheng District, Beijing
- Nominator: Premier (chosen within the Chinese Communist Party)
- Appointer: President with the confirmation of the National People's Congress or its Standing Committee
- Formation: 17 March 2003; 23 years ago
- First holder: Lü Fuyuan
- Deputy: Vice Minister of Commerce

The minister of commerce of the People's Republic of China is the head of the Ministry of Commerce of the People's Republic of China and a member of the State Council. Within the State Council, the position is twentieth in order of precedence. The minister is responsible for leading the ministry, presiding over its meetings, and signing important documents related to the ministry. Officially, the minister is nominated by the premier of the State Council, who is then approved by the National People's Congress or its Standing Committee and appointed by the president.

The current minister is Wang Wentao, who concurrently serves as the Chinese Communist Party Committee Secretary of the ministry.

== List of ministers ==
Name	Took office	Left office	Ref.
Minister of Trade
Ye Jizhuang	October 1949	August 1952	
Minister of Foreign Trade
Ye Jizhuang	August 1952	June 1967	
Lin Haiyun	June 1967	July 1970	
Bai Xiangguo	July 1970	October 1973	
Li Qiang	October 1973	September 1981	
Zheng Tuobin	September 1981	March 1982	
Minister of Foreign Economic Relations and Trade
Chen Muhua	March 1982	March 1985	
Zheng Tuobin	March 1985	December 1990	
Li Lanqing	December 1990	March 1993	
Minister of Foreign Trade and Economic Co-operation
Wu Yi	March 1993	March 1998	
Shi Guangsheng	March 1998	March 2003	
Minister of Commerce
Lü Fuyuan	17 March 2003	29 February 2004	
Bo Xilai	29 February 2004	29 December 2007	
Chen Deming	29 December 2007	16 March 2013	
Gao Hucheng	16 March 2013	24 February 2017	
Zhong Shan	24 February 2017	26 December 2020	
Wang Wentao	26 December 2020	Incumbent	
