= Richard Gotabhaya Senanayake =

Sri Lankan politician (1911–1970)

Member of the Ceylon Parliament for Dambadeniya
- In office 14 October 1947 – May 1970
- Succeeded by: P. B. Wettewe

Member of the Ceylon Parliament for Kelaniya
- In office 10 April 1956 – 19 March 1960
- Preceded by: J. R. Jayewardene
- Succeeded by: J. R. Jayewardene

Personal details
- Born: 4 November 1911
- Died: 22 December 1970 (aged 59)
- Party: United National Party
- Spouse: Erin née Subasinghe
- Children: Jayantha
- Education: Royal College Colombo, Downing College, Cambridge
- Occupation: Politician
- Profession: Barrister

Richard Gotabhaya Senanayake (4 November 1911 – 22 December 1970; popularly known as R.G. Senanayake) was a Sri Lankan politician. He was Minister of Trade and Commerce during the period 1952-56 and 1956-60. He was elected a Member of Parliament from Dambadeniya in 1952 and in 1956 from Kelaniya, thus holding concurrent seats from two constituencies, while he retained his seat from Dambadeniya in 1960 and 1965. He was the eldest son of the freedom fighter Fredrick Richard Senanayake and was educated at the Royal College, Colombo and at Downing College, Cambridge and had become a barrister.

== Early life and education ==
Richard Gotabhaya Senanayake, was born on 4 November 1911 to Fredrick Richard Senanayake, a barrister and Ellen Senanayake nee Attygalle, the youngest daughter of Mudaliyar Don Charles Gemoris Attygalle. He was the eldest son, amount eight siblings. A member of the Senanayake family, his cousins included future prime ministers Dudley Senanayake and Sir John Kotelawala.

Like his father, R.G. Senanayake was educated at Royal College, Colombo and at Downing College, Cambridge, where he gained a BA and an LL.B. degree. He was called to the bar as a barrister from the Lincoln's Inn, London. On his return he was enrolled as an advocate and started his legal practice in civil law at Hulftsdorp.

== Political career ==
=== State Council ===
R.G. Senanayake left his legal practice and entered mainstream politics in 1943, when he contested a by-election for the Naranwala electorate, which had been made vacate by the sudden death of his brother-in-law Siripala Samarakkody. He was elected from Naranwala to the State Council of Ceylon.

=== Parliament ===
In the 1947 general election, he contested the Dambadeniya constituency and was elected to Parliament of Ceylon from the United National Party. His uncle D. S. Senanayake, who became the first prime minister of Ceylon and held the portfolio of Defence and External Affairs as prime minister, appointed R.G. Senanayake as Parliamentary Secretary to the Minister of External Affairs and Defence.

=== Minister of Trade and Commerce ===
Following the sudden death of D.S. Senanayake, his cousin Dudley Senanayake succeeded his father as Prime Minister. The new Prime Minister offered R.G. Senanayake the post of Minister of Trade and Commerce. As Minister of Trade and Commerce, R. G. Senanayake initiated many of the first major post-independence trade policies such as the Ceylon-China Rubber-Rice Pact and the tripartite Trade agreement between Ceylon, Egypt and Japan. He initiated the Ceylonese enterprise in commerce that was dominated by Europeans in the British colonial era. The Ceylon-China Rubber-Rice Pact, signed in 1952, which had a five-year term and renewable proved to be a cornerstone Ceylon foreign policy, establishing close relations with the People's Republic of China and Sri Lanka. The pact was beneficial to Ceylon that depended on rice exports, but came into conflict with the pro-western government. He continued to hold the post of Minister of Trade and Commerce under his cousin Sir John Kotelawala, who succeeded Dudley Senanayake. However, he opposed Kotelawela's plans to join the South East Asia Treaty Organisation (SEATO), which resulted in Kotelawela dropping the idea. He further opposed Kotelawela's plans to grant citizenship to foreigners. With mounting differences of opinions, notably with tension mounting between United National Party strongman and distant relative J. R. Jayawardene, Senanayake resigned his Ministerial portfolio on 10 July 1954 and was later expelled from the United National Party.

=== Independent candidate ===
As an independent candidate, he contested the 1956 general election from two constituencies Kelaniya and Dambadeniya. He won in both, defeating J. R. Jayewardene in the Kelaniya electorate. Re-elected to parliament, Senanayake now represented two electorates, a first in Ceylon. However, the Attorney General ruled that he was entitled for only one vote and allowance.

=== Minister of Trade and Commerce ===
He joined the government of S. W. R. D. Bandaranaike, having been appointed again Minister of Trade and Commerce. He along with Philip Gunawardena, Minister for Agriculture and Food; was instrumental in convincing Bandaranaike to award the lucrative shipping contract to import rice from Burma and Thailand to the government-owned Ceylon Shipping Corporation and the lucrative sugar manufacturing contract to the government-owned Sugar Cooperation, preventing these going to companies created by Mapitigama Buddharakkitha Thero and his associate H. P. Jayawardene. This was found to be the reason for the assassination of Bandaranaike in 1959. Following the assassination, Senanayake served under his successor W. Dahanayake as Minister of Food, Commerce and Trade.

=== Sinhala Peoples Party ===
R.G. Senanayake retained his seat in parliament in the 1960 March general election and 1960 July general election as well as in the 1965 general election as an independent candidate from Dambadeniya. In 1968, he formed his own party The Sinhala Mahajana Pakshaya (the Sinhala Peoples Party) and contested the 1970 general election from the Dambadeniya and Trincomalee electorates. He polled third in Dambadeniya and fourth in Trincomalee, losing his seat after 27 years in parliament.

== Death and legacy ==
He died on 22 December 1970. In 2013, Gregory's Road in Colombo was renamed R G Senanayake Mawatha in his memory.

== Family ==
R.G. Senanayake married Erin Senanayake née Subasinghe, they had one son Jayantha.

== See also ==
- List of political families in Sri Lanka
