= Lu Chunfang =

Chinese engineer

- 卢春房

Deputy General Manager of China National Railway Group Limited
- Incumbent
- Assumed office March 2013

Vice Minister of Railways
- In office March 2005 – March 2013
- Minister: Liu Zhijun; Sheng Guangzu

Personal details
- Born: 15 May 1956 (age 70) Li County, Hebei, China
- Party: Chinese Communist Party
- Education: Southwest Jiaotong University; Tsinghua University
- Scientific career
- Fields: Engineering management
- Workplaces: China National Railway Group Limited

Chinese name
- Simplified Chinese: 卢春房
- Traditional Chinese: 盧春房
Transcriptions
Standard Mandarin
- Hanyu Pinyin: Lú Chūnfáng

Lu Chunfang (born 15 May 1956) is a Chinese engineer who is deputy general manager of China National Railway Group Limited, a former vice minister of railways, and an academician of the Chinese Academy of Engineering.

== Biography ==
Lu was born in Li County, Hebei, on 15 May 1956. He enlisted in the People's Liberation Army in January 1975 and was assigned to the First Division of Mechanical battalion of Railway Corps as a repairman. After resuming the college entrance examination, he entered Southwest Jiaotong University, where he majored in railway engineering. He also earned a master's degree from Tsinghua University in 2007.

After university in 1982, he became an engineer at the Ministry of Railways. He moved up the ranks to become Chinese Communist Party Committee Secretary and general manager of China Railway Qinghai-Tibet Group Co., Ltd. in June 2001 and vice minister in March 2005, which was reshuffled as China National Railway Group Limited in March 2013. In January 2017, he became chairman of China Railway Society. In March 2018, he became a member of the 13th National Committee of the Chinese People's Political Consultative Conference.

== Honors and awards ==
- 2015 State Science and Technology Progress Award (Special Prize)
- 27 November 2017 Member of the Chinese Academy of Engineering (CAE)
