= National Railways =

National Railway, National Railways, National Rail, National Railroad and similar names can refer to:

== Europe ==
- National Rail, the brand name used for mainline passenger railway services in the United Kingdom
- National Railway Company of Belgium, state-owned railway operator
- Swiss National Railway, a former railway company in Switzerland

== Australia ==
- National Rail Corporation, a former rail operator in Australia
- Australian National Railways Commission, trading as Australian National Railways, a government-owned rail operator from 1975–1998

== Americas ==
- National Railroad of Mexico, or Mexican National Railway, a pre-nationalisation railway system 1880–1909
- National Railway Company of Cuba, passenger and freight railway operator
- National Railway or National Air-Line Railroad, an air-line railroad in the United States planned in the 1870s
- Canadian National Railway, a Class I freight railroad in Canada in the United States

== Asia ==
- National Railway Administration, the railway regulator in China
- Japanese National Railways, the national railway operator from 1948–1987
- Korean National Railroad, the railway network manager in South Korea from 1963–2005, split into
  - Korea National Railway, a railroad construction and management company
  - Korail, a train operating company
- Philippine National Railways, a state-owned rail operator in the Philippines

== Africa ==
- National Railways of Zimbabwe, the state-owned enterprise which operators the national railway system
- National Company for Rail Transport or National Rail Transportation Company, the national rail operator in Algeria
- Egyptian National Railways, the national railway manager and operator

== See also ==
- List of national railway administrations
- Rail transportation in the United States, whose rail network is sometimes called the "national rail network"
  - Amtrak, the trading name of the National Railroad Passenger Corporation, a national passenger train operator in the United States
- Commonwealth Railways, a former Australian railway operator
- National Railway Museum (disambiguation)
- National Railway Equipment, an American railroad equipment rebuilding, leasing, and manufacturing company.
- Railway nationalisation
