= Fei Dongbin =

Chinese politician (born 1970)

- 费东斌

Director of the National Railway Administration
- In office 24 October 2022 – 12 June 2025
- Preceded by: Liu Zhenfang
- Succeeded by: TBA

Personal details
- Born: August 1970 (age 56) Jinzhou, Liaoning, China
- Party: Chinese Communist Party (1996–2025; expelled)
- Education: Central South University; Tsinghua University

Chinese name
- Simplified Chinese: 费东斌
- Traditional Chinese: 費東斌
Transcriptions
Standard Mandarin
- Hanyu Pinyin: Fèi Dōngbīn

Fei Dongbin (Chinese: 费东斌; born August 1970) is a Chinese politician who was the director of the National Railway Administration, in office since September 2022 to June 2025. He has been under disciplinary and supervisory investigation for possible corruption since June 2025.

He is a representative of the 20th National Congress of the Chinese Communist Party. He was a delegate to the 12th and 13th National People's Congress. In December 2025, Fei was expelled from the Chinese Communist Party.

== Early life and education ==
Fei was born in Jinzhou, Liaoning, in August 1970. In 1987, he entered Changsha Railway College (now Central South University), majoring in railroad transportation. He joined the Chinese Communist Party (CCP) in March 1996.

== Career in railway system (1991-2016) ==
After graduating in 1991, he was assigned to Shenyang Railway Bureau, where he eventually served as chief engineer and deputy director in 2006. In May 2007, he was appointed executive deputy general manager of the Qinghai-Tibet Railway Company (now China Railway Qingzang Group), but having held the position for only one year. He served in the Transportation Bureau of the Ministry of Railways for four months in 2008 and soon was chosen as executive deputy director of the Beijing Railway Bureau in October 2008. In April 2009, Fei was appointed executive deputy director of the Jinan Railway Bureau, he remained in that position until January 2013, when he was transferred to Inner Mongolia and appointed director of the Hohhot Railway Bureau.

== Political career ==
He served a short term as deputy party secretary of Hohhot and secretary of the Political and Legal Affairs Commission in 2016. In October 2016, he was named acting mayor of Ulanqab, confirmed in January 2017. He was elevated to party secretary, the top political position in the city, in June 2020.

Fei was promoted to vice governor of Henan in April 2021 and six months later was admitted to member of the Standing Committee of the CCP Henan Provincial Committee, the province's top authority.

== Career in railway system (2022-2025) ==
In September 2022, he was made party branch secretary of the National Railway Administration, concurrently holding the director position.

== Downfall ==
On June 12, 2025, the Central Commission for Discipline Inspection and the National Supervisory Commission announced that Fei was under disciplinary review and supervisory investigation for suspected serious violations of discipline and law. In December 2025, he was expelled from the CCP and dismissed from public office. On 29 October 2026, the fifth plenary session of the 20th CCP Central Committee reviewed and approved the report of the CCDI on the "serious violations of discipline and law" by Fei and confirmed the Politburo decision to expel him from the CCP.

Government offices
| Preceded by Yang Yudong | Director of the Hohhot Railway Bureau; 2013–2016 | Succeeded by Zhang Jiyi |
| Preceded by Ai Lihua | Mayor of Ulanqab City; 2016–2021 | Succeeded by Qi Feiyun |
| Preceded by Liu Zhenfang | Director of the National Railway Administration; 2022–2025 | Succeeded by TBA |
Party political offices
| Preceded by Du Xuejun | Communist Party Secretary of Ulanqab City; 2020–2021 | Succeeded by Sui Weijun |
