= Guo Zhuxue =

Chinese politician

- 郭竹学

Chairman of China State Railway Group Co., Ltd.
- Incumbent
- Assumed office 22 October 2024
- Preceded by: Liu Zhenfang

General Manager of China State Railway Group Co., Ltd.
- In office July 2022 – 22 October 2024
- Preceded by: Yang Yudong

Personal details
- Born: November 1966 (age 59) Yuanshi County, Hebei, China
- Party: Chinese Communist Party
- Education: Shijiazhuang Railway Transport School; Beijing Jiaotong University

Chinese name
- Simplified Chinese: 郭竹学
- Traditional Chinese: 郭竹學
Transcriptions
Standard Mandarin
- Hanyu Pinyin: Guō Zhúxué

Guo Zhuxue (Chinese: 郭竹学; born November 1966) is a Chinese senior executive and politician, currently serving as chairman of China State Railway Group Co., Ltd., in office since October 2024.

Guo is an alternate of the 20th Central Committee of the Chinese Communist Party.

== Early life and education ==
Guo was born in Yuanshi County, Hebei, in November 1966. In 1984, he enrolled at Shijiazhuang Railway Transport School, where he majored in railway transportation. He earned his master of management degree from Northern Jiaotong University (now Beijing Jiaotong University) in July 2012.

== Career ==
Guo joined the Chinese Communist Party (CCP) in December 1985. After graduating in 1986, Guo was assigned to Beijing Railway Bureau of Beijing Branch of the Ministry of Railways. In September 1989, he moved to the Dispatch Bureau of Transportation Dispatch Command Center, eventually became deputy director in January 2006.

Guo was general manager of Guangzhou Railway (Group) Corporation (now China Railway Guangzhou Group) in January 2008, director of Nanchang Railway Bureau (now China Railway Nanchang Group) in June 2011, director of Shanghai Railway Bureau (now China Railway Shanghai Group) in January 2013, and director of Beijing Railway Bureau (later was reshuffled as China Railway Beijing Group) in May 2017.

In May 2018, he became deputy general manager of China Railway Corporation (later was reshuffled as China State Railway Group Co., Ltd.), rising to general manager in July 2022. On 22 October 2024, he was appointed chairman of China State Railway Group Co., Ltd., succeeding Liu Zhenfang.

Government offices
Preceded by Zhu Youwen	General Manager of Guangzhou Railway (Group) Corporation of the Ministry of Railways; 2008–2011	Succeeded by Li Wenxin
Preceded by Shao Liping	Director of Nanchang Railway Bureau of the Ministry of Railways; 2011–2013	Succeeded by Liu Zhenfang
Preceded by An Lusheng	Director of Shanghai Railway Bureau of the Ministry of Railways; 2013	Succeeded by Position revoked
Business positions
New title	Director of Shanghai Railway Bureau of China Railway Corporation; 2013–2017	Succeeded by Hou Wenyu
Preceded by Liu Zhenfang	Director of Beijing Railway Bureau of China Railway Corporation; 2017	Succeeded by Position revoked
New title	Chairman of China Railway Beijing Group Co., Ltd. 2017–2018	Succeeded by Zhao Chunlei
Preceded by Yang Yudong	General Manager of China State Railway Group Co., Ltd. 2022–2024	Succeeded by TBA
Preceded by Liu Zhenfang	Chairman of China State Railway Group Co., Ltd. 2024–present	Incumbent
