= Liu Zhenfang =

- 刘振芳

Chairman of China State Railway Group Co., Ltd.
- In office 22 July 2022 – 22 October 2024
- Preceded by: Lu Dongfu
- Succeeded by: Guo Zhuxue

Director of the National Railway Administration
- In office November 2019 – July 2022
- Preceded by: Yang Yudong
- Succeeded by: Fei Dongbin

Personal details
- Born: September 1961 (age 65) Zhengding County, Hebei, China
- Party: Chinese Communist Party
- Education: Beijing Jiaotong University; Tsinghua University

Chinese name
- Simplified Chinese: 刘振芳
- Traditional Chinese: 劉振芳
Transcriptions
Standard Mandarin
- Hanyu Pinyin: Liú Zhènfāng

Liu Zhenfang (Chinese: 刘振芳; born September 1961) is a Chinese senior executive and politician who served as chairman of China State Railway Group Co., Ltd. from 2022 to 2024.

Liu is a representative of the 20th National Congress of the Chinese Communist Party and a delegate to the 14th National People's Congress.

== Early life and education ==
Liu was born in Zhengding County, Hebei, in September 1961. After resuming the college entrance examination, in 1979, he enrolled at Northern Jiaotong University (now Beijing Jiaotong University), where he majored in locomotive electric drive. He obtained his master of engineering degree from Tsinghua University in July 2006.

== Career ==
After university in 1983, Liu was assigned to Datong Branch of Beijing Railway Bureau, Ministry of Railways, where he had serve at every level and ultimately being appointed deputy director in April 2000. Liu joined the Chinese Communist Party (CCP) in March 1994.

In December 2004, Liu became deputy director of Kunming Railway Bureau (now China Railway Kunming Group), rising to director in August 2011. Liu was director of Nanchang Railway Bureau (now China Railway Nanchang Group) in January 2013 and subsequently director of Beijing Railway Bureau （now China Railway Beijing Group） in August 2014.

Liu served as deputy general manager of China Railway Corporation (later was reshuffled as China State Railway Group Co., Ltd.) in December 2018, and eleven months later promoted to director of the National Railway Administration. On 22 July 2022, he became chairman of China State Railway Group Co., Ltd., a post he kept until October 2024, when he was replaced by Guo Zhuxue.

Government offices
Preceded by Wen Qingliang	Director of Kunming Railway Bureau of the Ministry of Railways; 2011–2013	Succeeded by Liu Baisheng
Preceded by Guo Zhuxue	Director of Nanchang Railway Bureau of the Ministry of Railways; 2013	Succeeded by Position revoked
Preceded by Yang Yudong	Director of the National Railway Administration; 2019–2022	Succeeded by Fei Dongbin
Business positions
New title	Director of Nanchang Railway Bureau of China Railway Corporation; 2013–2014	Succeeded by Wang Pei
Preceded by Yang Yudong	Director of Beijing Railway Bureau of China Railway Corporation; 2014–2017	Succeeded by Guo Zhuxue
Preceded by Lu Dongfu	Chairman of China State Railway Group Co., Ltd. 2022–2024	Succeeded by Guo Zhuxue
