= Duan Junyi =

Chinese politician

Minister of Railways
- In office December 1976 – March 1978
- Preceded by: Wan Li
- Succeeded by: Guo Weicheng

Personal details
- Born: 13 March 1910 Fan County, Henan, China
- Died: 8 March 2004 (aged 93)

Duan Junyi (Chinese: 段君毅; March 13, 1910 – March 8, 2004) was a politician of the People's Republic of China.

After the fall of the Gang of Four, Duan served as the Minister of Railways of China. In August 1978, he became governor of Henan. In October 1978, he became the Chinese Communist Party Committee Secretary of Henan, director of Henan Revolutionary Committee, and the first political commissar of the provincial military region.

From January 1981 to May 1984, Duan served as the first secretary of the Beijing committee of the CCP, and the first political commissar of the Beijing Defense Area.

In September 1982, Duan was appointed as a standing committee member of the CCP's Central Advisory Commission. He retired in October 1992.

Duan was a member of 10th and 11th Central Committees of the Chinese Communist Party.

Government offices
Preceded by Wan Li	Minister of Railways of the People's Republic of China; 1976–1978	Succeeded by Guo Weicheng
Party political offices
Preceded by Lin Hujia	Secretary of the CPC Beijing Committee; 1981–1984	Succeeded by Li Ximing
