= Sheng Guangzu =

Chinese politician

- 盛光祖
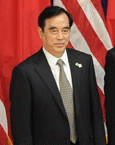

Genenal Manager of China Railway Corporation
- In office 14 March 2013 – 9 October 2016
- Succeeded by: Lu Dongfu

Minister of Railways
- In office 25 February 2011 – 14 March 2013
- Premier: Wen Jiabao
- Preceded by: Liu Zhijun
- Succeeded by: post abolished

Personal details
- Born: 5 April 1949 (age 77) Nanjing, Jiangsu, China
- Party: Chinese Communist Party (expelled)
- Education: Tongji University

Sheng Guangzu (Chinese: 盛光祖; pinyin: Shèng Guāngzǔ; born 5 April 1949) is a Chinese politician. He served as the last Chinese Minister of Railways before the position was abolished in March 2013, and the first General Manager of China Railway Corporation. He was formerly the head of the General Administration of Customs of the People's Republic of China. He initially held several lower positions in the Ministry of Railways, and moved up the ranks starting in 2000. Sheng was also a member of the 17th Central Committee of the Chinese Communist Party.

== Early life and education ==
Born in April 1949 in Nanjing, Jiangsu, he holds a bachelor's degree.

== Career ==
While deputy governor of the Ministry of China Railway Communication, he supported the creation of China Netcom to compete with China Telecom. He became a board member of China Netcom and the Ministry of Railways was given a quarter interest in the company.

Sheng replaced his predecessor Liu Zhijun who was dismissed for corruption. During his tenure, the Wenzhou train collision occurred on July 23, 2011, killing 40, and injuring 192 (12 severely).

Sheng retired in October 2016. He was replaced by Lu Dongfu, as the first director of the National Railways Administration (NRA). In November 2016, he was appointed as vice-chairperson of the National People's Congress Financial and Economic Affairs Committee.

== Downfall ==
On 25 March 2022, he was placed under investigation for "serious violations of discipline and laws" by the Central Commission for Discipline Inspection (CCDI), the party's internal disciplinary body, and the National Supervisory Commission, the highest anti-corruption agency of China. On September 19, he was expelled from the Chinese Communist Party. He was arrested by the Supreme People's Procuratorate on October 8.

In 2023 he was jailed for corruption.

Government offices
Preceded by Mou Xinsheng	Minister of the General Administration of Customs; 2008–2011	Succeeded by Yu Guangzhou
Preceded by Liu Zhijun	Minister of Railways; February 2011 – March 2013	Ministry abolished
Business positions
New title	Genenal Manager of China Railway Corporation; March 2013 – October 2016	Succeeded by Lu Dongfu
