= Liu Jianzhang =

Chinese politician

Liu Jianzhang (simplified Chinese: 刘建章; traditional Chinese: 劉建章; pinyin: Liú Jiànzhāng; 1910 – February 14, 2008) was a politician of the People's Republic of China and a former Minister of Railways of China. Liu previously served as the vice president, but then saw approximately 5 years in jail without trial. He was released when his wife wrote to Mao Zedong who personally had him freed in 1972.

Government offices
Preceded by Guo Weicheng	Minister of Railways of the People's Republic of China; 1981–1982	Succeeded by Chen Puru
