= Guo Weicheng =

Chinese politician (1912–1995)

Guo Weicheng (simplified Chinese: 郭维城; traditional Chinese: 郭維城; pinyin: Guō Wéichéng) (1912 – January 1, 1995) was a major general of the People's Liberation Army, a politician of the People's Republic of China, and a former Minister of Railways of China.

Belonging to Manchu people, Guo was born in Yi County, Liaoning, and joined the Chinese Communist Party (CCP) in 1933. He graduated from the Department of Politics at Fudan University in Shanghai and obtained a bachelor's degree of law. Guo served as a key secretary to Zhang Xueliang.

Guo attained the rank of major general in 1955.

Government offices
Preceded by Duan Junyi	Minister of Railways of the People's Republic of China; 1978 – 1981	Succeeded by Liu Jianzhang
