= Mou Xinsheng =

Chinese politician (born 1943)

- 牟新生
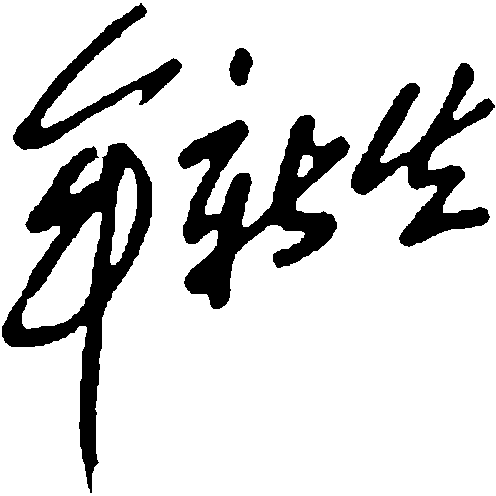
- Signature of Mou Xinsheng

Head of the General Administration of Customs
- In office March 2001 – March 2008
- Premier: Zhu Rongji; Wen Jiabao
- Preceded by: Qian Guanlin
- Succeeded by: Sheng Guangzu

Personal details
- Born: December 1943 (age 82) Fufeng County, Shaanxi, China
- Party: Chinese Communist Party
- Education: Northwest University of Politics and Law; Central Party School of the Chinese Communist Party

Mou Xinsheng (Chinese: 牟新生; pinyin: Móu Xīnshēng; born December 1943) is a Chinese politician who served as head of the General Administration of Customs from 2001 to 2008. He was a member of the 16th Central Committee of the Chinese Communist Party. He was a delegate to the 11th National People's Congress.

== Biography ==
Mou was born in Fufeng County, Shaanxi, in December 1943. In 1963, he was accepted to the Northwest University of Politics and Law, majoring in law.

One year after graduation from university, he was assigned to a PLA affiliated farm. In May 1970, he became an official in the Tacheng Prefecture Public Security Office of Xinjiang Uygur Autonomous Region, and served until December 1973, when he was reassigned to the Beijing General Petrochemical Plant. He joined the Beijing Municipal Public Security Bureau in August 1974, and worked there until April 1980. He was despatched to the Ministry of Public Security in April 1980, becoming vice minister in March 1993. Two months later, he became an official in the State Council, and worked there for five years. In November 1998, he was appointed deputy head of the General Administration of Customs, concurrently serving as deputy director of China National Narcotics Control Committee and vice minister of Public Security. He was promoted to head of the General Administration of Customs in March 2001, and held that office until March 2008. During his term in office, He handled the Lai Changxing Case. In March 2008, he took office as vice chairperson of the National People's Congress Financial and Economic Affairs Committee.

Government offices
Preceded by Qian Guanlin	Head of the General Administration of Customs; 2001–2008	Succeeded by Sheng Guangzu
