= Financial and Economic Affairs Committee =

Committee of the National People's Congress in People's Republic of China

- 全国人民代表大会财政经济委员会
- Abbreviation: (全国人大监察和司法委员会)
- Formation: June 7, 1983
- Type: Special committee of the National People's Congress
- Legal status: Active
- Location: Beijing
- Chairperson: Zhong Shan
- Parent organization: National People's Congress; Standing Committee of the National People's Congress (when the NPC is not in session)

The Financial and Economic Affairs Committee of the National People's Congress (Chinese: 全国人民代表大会财政经济委员会; pinyin: Quánguó Rénmín Dàibiǎo Dàhuì Cáizhèng Jīngjì Wěiyuánhuì) is one of ten special committees of the National People's Congress, the national legislature of the People's Republic of China. The special committee was created during the first session of the 6th National People's Congress in March 1983, and has existed in every National People's Congress since.

== Functions ==
The committee is one of the most important special committees of the NPC in terms of financial-policy making. According to the Organic Law of the NPC, the Financial and Economic Affairs Committee "reviews draft plans for national economic and social development, draft outlines of five-year plans, central and local draft budgets, drafts of central final accounts, as well as relevant reports and adjusted plans, and the Committee brings forward preliminary review comments and reports on the results of the reviews thereafter". The committee also carries out research and addresses financial and economic inquiries.

== Chairpersons ==
Congress	Chairperson	Vice-Chairpersons
6th National People's Congress	Wang Renzhong	
7th National People's Congress	Chen Muhua	
8th National People's Congress	Liu Suinian (柳随年)	
9th National People's Congress	Chen Guangyi	
10th National People's Congress	Fu Zhihuan (傅志寰)	
11th National People's Congress	Shi Xiushi (石秀诗)	Wen Shizhen, Wang Rucheng, Mou Xinsheng, Han Yuqun, Gao Qiang, Zhao Keming, Chu Bo, Xu Guangchun, Peng Xiaofeng, Liang Baohua, Wei Liucheng, Lu Zushan, Wu Xiaoling, He Keng, Urtu, Hao Ruyu, Yin Zhongqing
12th National People's Congress	Li Shenglin (李盛霖)	Shi Zhongyuan, Lü Zushan, Liao Xiaojun, Zhang Qinsheng, Wu Xiaoling, Peng Sen, Gu Shengzu, Shao Ning, Yin Zhongqing, Urtu, Xiong Qunli, Hao Ruyu
13th National People's Congress	Xu Shaoshi (徐绍史)	Wang Li, Wang Dongjing, Lü Wei, Zhuang Yumin, Liu Xiuwen, Sun Baohou, Wang Kang, Ouyang Changqiong, Zhou Songhe, Xu Rujun, Qian Fangli, Cai Ling, Cai Jiming
14th National People's Congress	Zhong Shan (钟山)	

== See also ==
- Committee for Economic Affairs, CPPCC NC counterpart
- Central Financial and Economic Affairs Commission, financial apparatus of CCP
