= Wenzhou train collision =

Public transportation accident in Wenzhou, China

- After the collision, four cars of the rear train fell off the Ou River bridge, striking the ground more than 20 m (66 ft) below

Details
- Date: 23 July 2011; 20:34 CST (UTC+08:00)
- Location: Lucheng District, Wenzhou, Zhejiang
- Coordinates: 28°00′42″N 120°35′22″E
- Country: China
- Line: Ningbo–Taizhou–Wenzhou Railway; Part of Hangzhou–Fuzhou–Shenzhen PDL
- Operator: China Railway High-speed
- Incident type: Collision, derailment
- Cause: Railway signal failure

Statistics
- Trains: 2
- Passengers: 1,630
- Deaths: 40
- Injured: 192+

The Wenzhou train collision was a railway accident that occurred on 23 July 2011, when a high-speed train travelling on the Yong-Tai-Wen railway line collided into the rear of another stationary train on a viaduct in Lucheng, Wenzhou. The two trains derailed, and four carriages fell off the viaduct. 40 people were killed, and at least 192 were injured, 12 severely. The disaster was caused by both defects in railway signal design and poor management by the railway company.

The collision is the first fatal crash and the only crash with major fatalities involving high-speed rail (HSR) in China. (Note: In 2022, one person was killed in a crash in Guizhou.) High speed was not a factor in the accident, however, since neither train was moving faster than 99 km/h (62 mph), a moderate speed for a passenger train.

Local officials responded to the accident by hastily conducting rescue operations and on-site burial of the derailed carriages. These actions elicited strong criticism from Chinese media and online communities. In response, the government issued directives to restrict media coverage, which was met with limited compliance, even on state-owned networks.

The accident had a profound impact on the development of high-speed rail in China. Public confidence in high-speed rail eroded, resulting in fewer passengers using the service for a short time. Construction of high-speed rail lines in China was temporarily suspended while the accident was under investigation. Speeds on other major high-speed rail lines in China were reduced until improvements were made. China's reputation in high-speed railway technology was scrutinized internationally.

In response to the accident, railways minister Sheng Guangzu announced a comprehensive two-month railway safety review. The official investigation completed in December 2011 blamed faulty signal systems which failed to warn the second train of the stationary first train on the same track, as well as a series of management failures on the part of railway officials in carrying out the due procedure.

The accident led to the implementation of substantial safety improvements, which has so far helped to prevent any further accidents in China's high-speed rail network.

== Background ==
The Chinese government invested billions of dollars in the rapid expansion of its high-speed railway network in the 2000s, including over RMB¥ 700 billion (US$109 billion) on high speed rail in 2010. By 2011, China's high speed rail stretched more than 8,538 km (5,305 mi) expanding to 13,000 km (8,100 mi) by 2012, with plans to double to about 16,000 km (9,900 mi) by 2020. The nation's entire 91,000 km (57,000 mi) rail network carried 1.68 billion rides in 2010 with little cause for alarm. The BBC accurately predicted that at this pace, by 2012, mainland China would have had more high-speed railway tracks than the rest of the world put together.

== Signalling ==
Railway signalling systems are designed to prevent any train from entering a stretch of track occupied by another train. But in the Wenzhou collision, Train D301 ran onto the track occupied by Train D3115, indicating a signal failure. The 28 July 2011 announcement, by the Beijing National Railway Research and Design Institute of Signals and Communication, that signal equipment had a design flaw, and that it would "shoulder responsibility" for the accident, confirmed that the accident was a result of signal failure.

The signalling technology installed on Chinese 200 to 250 km/h (120 to 160 mph) high speed lines, including the Ningbo–Taizhou–Wenzhou railway where the accident occurred, is Chinese Train Control System CTCS-2 which is the Chinese version of European Train Control System Level 1. (Note: ETCS, European Train Control System is part of ERTMS.) The CTCS-2 system uses the classical technology of track circuits to detect the presence of a train on a piece of track. In addition, CTCS-2 uses both fixed-data balises (track-mounted transponders) and controllable-data balises controlled by a Lineside Electronic Unit (LEU) to transmit essential information and signal instructions from the Train Control Center to trains. Information and signal instructions are transmitted by the balises as "telegrams", which are picked up by a balise transmission module mounted under the head of the train, and sent to an on-board "vital computer" for decoding. Using the data it has received, the computer calculates a "speed control curve" showing the maximum speed the train can maintain while allowing sufficient braking distance before any danger. The information is displayed to the train driver on a monitor. Should the driver disregard this information by overspeeding, or enter a danger zone, the Vital Computer can make an automatic brake application.

As of 31 July 2011, Chinese authorities had failed to provide any logical explanation of why the safeguards built into the CTCS-2 signal technology had failed to work in the Wenzhou collision. Various announcements indicated both defects in equipment (lightning strikes had disabled devices) and defects in operating procedures (staff operated signals in "manual mode"). An Lusheng, the chief of the Shanghai Railway Bureau, was quoted as saying that a device had "failed to turn from green to red". But CTCS-2 equipped trains do not rely on drivers observing green or red wayside signals, the driver has a computer-controlled monitor in front of him. Early announcements spoke of Train D3115 being stopped by a lightning strike, but that would not cause the accident. The second train D301 should not have been allowed to run into it. Whether Train D3115 was stopped by lightning or for any other reason is irrelevant.

The fuzzy and confused official announcements up to 31 July gave increasing hints that a lightning strike caused some wayside-mounted piece of signal equipment to malfunction (the official investigation report in December 2011 identified a trackside LKD2-T1 signal assembly which malfunctioned after being struck by lightning, causing a false indication in the control center that a section of track was unoccupied). If the equipment was not fail-safe, an incorrect response by staff could then cause an accident. Significantly, on 28 July 2011, An Lusheng "faulted the quality of equipment, personnel and on-site controls. He described safeguards as 'still quite weak'."

On 4 August 2011 a high-ranking work safety official ruled out the possibility of natural disaster having caused the train crash. "Now I can say for sure that this is not a natural disaster," Huang Yi, the spokesman and a leading official with the State Administration of Work Safety, said during an on-line chat hosted by people.com.cn, the online arm of People's Daily. He added that the railway authorities had also pointed out loopholes and deficiencies in safety management, which had emerged in the accident.

The official investigation, completed in December 2011, blamed faulty signal systems which had failed to warn the second train of the stationary first train on the same track, as well as a series of management failures on the part of railway officials in carrying out due procedure.

== Rolling stock ==
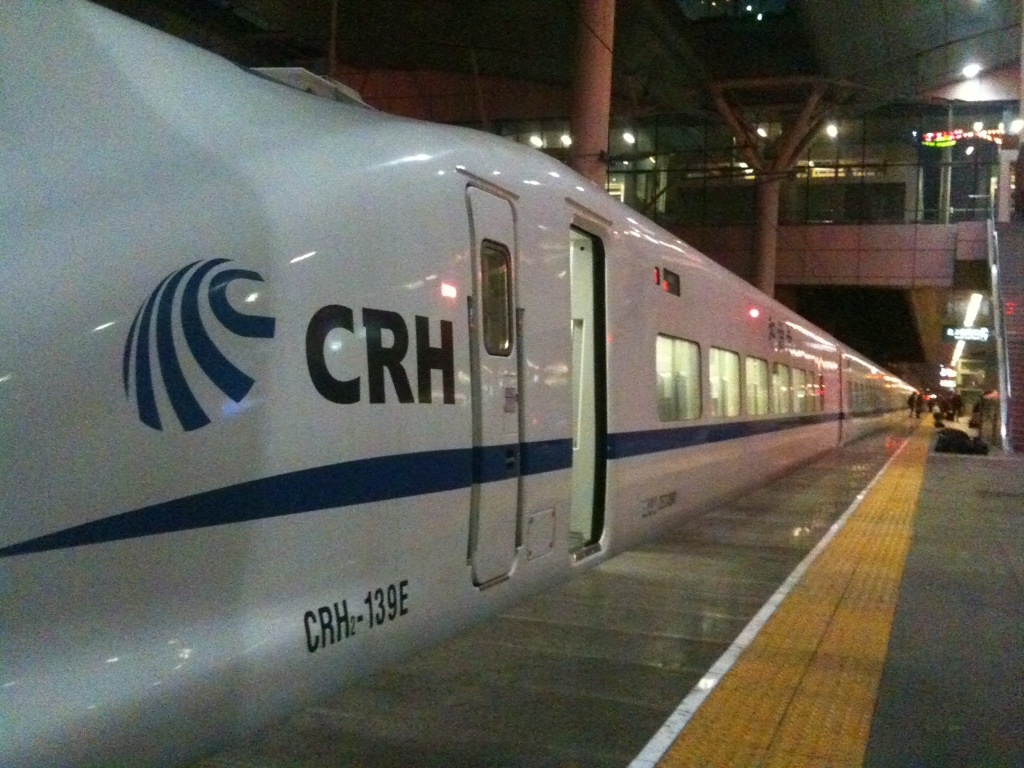
CRH2-139E, the trainset that was destroyed in the accident. This picture was captured in February 2011, five months before the accident.

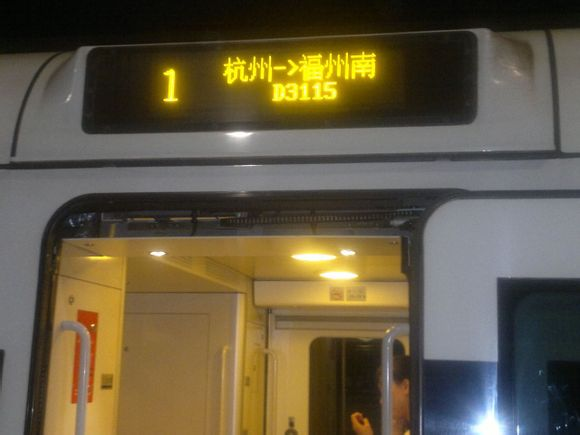
CRH1-046B (D3115) in 2014, after the accident

The two trains involved were based on technology from Bombardier and Kawasaki. Train CRH1-046B is a variant of the Swedish Bombardier Regina, while the second train CRH2-139E is a derivative of the Japanese E2 Series Shinkansen 'bullet train.' The Chinese maker has been attempting to patent the same technology and alleged improvements. The trains were of the "D train" class and thus in the first generation of China's express trains, not the faster "G train" class, which travel at more than 300 km/h (186 mph).

== Accident chronology ==
On 23 July, at roughly 20:00 CST, CRH train D3115 (CRH1-046B), carrying 1,072 people and travelling from Hangzhou to Fuzhou South came to a halt over a viaduct near the Ou River. Shortly after, CRH train D301 (CRH2-139E), carrying 558 people and running from Beijing South to Fuzhou, crashed into the rear-end of the stationary D3115.

The cause of the crash was initially said to be a lightning strike on one of the line's overhead power lines due to a lightning storm occurring 20 mi (32 km) south and 60 mi (97 km) west of the viaduct. Lightning reportedly struck the first train, which caused it to stop on the tracks. However, five days after the incident, the Beijing National Railway Research & Design Institute of Signals and Communications Co. Ltd., a railway research institute, claimed responsibility, stating in a report that a signal on the track failed to turn red, and staff failed to notice the error.

A much more detailed description of what happened in the accident, correcting earlier accounts, was published in the December 2011 report of the official investigation. The first train D3115 was stopped not by losing power as a result of the lightning strike, but was stopped by the signal system, the Automatic Train Protection (ATP). The lightning had struck a trackside LKD2-T1 signal assembly, burning out its fuses, and violating the rule that it should be 'fail-safe'. This had caused an incorrect indication in the control center that the track section containing train D3115 was unoccupied (the so-called 'green signal'). The driver He Li of train D3115 worked to override the ATP and, after more than seven minutes of waiting, at 8.29 pm he got the train moving again, overriding the ATP. As train D3115 entered the next section of track, where the track circuits that indicate the presence of the train were working correctly, the control center now saw that the track section was occupied. But driver Pan Yiheng of the following train D301 had already been given instructions to proceed onto the section of track where D3115 had been stopped, when the control center had a false indication that the track was unoccupied. Despite a message from the control center that D301 should proceed with caution, less than half a minute later train D301 running at 99 km/h (62 mph) collided with train D3115.

The fifteenth and sixteenth coaches at the rear of D3115 and the front four coaches of D301 were derailed – four coaches fell off the viaduct. Three carriages came to rest horizontally on the ground below while the fourth came to rest vertically, one end on the ground and one end leaning against the viaduct. Soon after the accident, the damaged railway carriages were seen being broken apart by backhoes and buried nearby.

The medical teams responding to the accident consisted of staff from Zhejiang No. 1 Hospital, Zhejiang No. 2 Hospital, Zhejiang Provincial People's Hospital and Taizhou Hospital. The evening of the event, 500 Wenzhou residents gave blood in response to early radio appeals by the local blood bank.

A survivor, Liu Hongtaohe, recalled that "the train suddenly shook violently, casting luggage all around. Passengers cried for help but no crew responded" in an interview with China Central Television. CCTV reported on 25 July that the Railways Ministry had declared that 39 people were killed and 192 injured. Two-year-old Xiang Weiyi was the last person rescued, 21 hours after the train crash. Her parents had been killed in the crash.

The U.S. Embassy in Beijing said on 25 July that two U.S. citizens were among the dead. The Italian consulate of Shanghai said that an Italian citizen was among the dead: Assunta Liguori, a 22-year-old student of the Università degli studi di Napoli L'Orientale. Liguori was travelling with Giovanni Pan, a 23-year-old student from L'Orientale, of Chinese origin.

== Government response ==
Chinese Communist Party general secretary Hu Jintao and Premier of the State Council Wen Jiabao called for "all-out efforts to rescue passengers". Train operations were suspended on the line while damaged infrastructure was repaired. Fifty-eight trains were canceled the following day. Sheng Guangzu, the Railways Minister, ordered an investigation into the accident, and arrived at the scene of the accident on midday 24 July. He also apologised for the accident. Vice-Premier Zhang Dejiang flew into Wenzhou to lead rescue efforts.

The Ministry of Railways announced that three high-ranking railway officials were fired immediately after the crash. They were identified as Long Jing, head of the Shanghai Railway Bureau; Li Jia, party secretary and the deputy chief of the bureau, He Shengli. The Chinese government had sacked railways minister Liu Zhijun in February 2011, for allegedly taking over 800 million yuan in kickbacks connected with contracts for high-speed rail expansion. Zhang Shuguang, the deputy chief engineer of China's railways, was also arrested in February 2011 and alleged to have amassed $2.8 billion in overseas accounts. The government ordered a two-month nationwide safety campaign on 26 July, as the families of victims demanded more answers. Sheng Guangzu apologised for the collision on behalf of the Railways department and said the campaign would focus on improving China's high-speed network.

Government officials had not explained by 25 July why the second train was apparently not warned of the disabled one before the crash took place.

Lawyers in China were ordered by the Wenzhou Judicial Bureau not to take on cases from the families of the crash victims. According to a statement issued by the Wenzhou Lawyers' Association, lawyers were told not to take cases because "the accident is a major sensitive issue concerning social stability". The Wenzhou Judicial Bureau later apologized for the statement, saying its wording had been formulated by the Lawyers' Association and had not been approved.

The Wenzhou train collision had an immediate and major effect on China's high-speed rail program. The Chinese government formed a commission to investigate the accident with a directive to report its findings in September 2011. On 10 August 2011 the Chinese government announced that it was suspending approvals of any new high-speed rail lines pending the outcome of the investigation. The Minister of Railways announced further cuts in the speed of Chinese high-speed trains, with the speed of the second-tier 'D' trains reduced from 250 to 200 km/h (155 to 124 mph). The speed of the remaining 350 km/h (220 mph) trains between Shanghai and Hangzhou was reduced to 300 km/h (186 mph) as of 28 August 2011. To stimulate ridership, which had suffered due to concerns about safety, on 16 August 2011 ticket prices on Chinese high-speed trains were reduced by 5 percent.

The train crash sparked public anger on the safety of high speed trains in China and on the handling of the accident, even in otherwise tightly controlled Chinese media. Quality and safety concerns will likely have a serious impact on China's ambition to export cheap high speed train technology to other countries.

In November 2011, the state-controlled The Beijing News reported that an investigation by the Chinese government into the collision has concluded that "poor management of the local railway administration" was to blame. The final report, which was released after a delay in December, found 54 officials responsible along with flaws in the design of the local control centre and some onboard components.

=== Official media directives ===
The Chinese authorities have been accused of attempting to silence reports into the cause of the crash. The Chinese Communist Party's propaganda department has reportedly ordered the media not to send reporters to the scene, not to report too frequently and not to link the story to high-speed rail development. Thomson Reuters reported that the propaganda department issued directives to the nation's media instructing them to not question or elaborate on reports of the train crash. In their coverage, media were directed to promote the theme 'in the face of great tragedy, there's great love.' Xinhuanet released a number of state-sponsored, touching stories as Propaganda Department's indication, such as "Love in this sublimation," "a city of love and warm" and comments. Still, according to the BBC, several Chinese newspapers published editorials criticising the railway ministry, and the state-run Global Times had an unusually scathing editorial.

On Friday, 29 July a second directive was issued banning all coverage of the story 'except positive news or that issued by the authorities'; the sudden ban forced newspapers to scrap seven-day anniversary stories they had prepared. The China Business Journal scrapped eight pages, 21st Century Business Herald twelve pages and The Beijing News nine pages. The state-run Xinhua newswire was forced to warn subscribers not to use an investigative report it had issued. The ban was flouted by Beijing-based weekly The Economic Observer, which published an eight-page feature on 30 July, with a front-page letter pledging to pursue the truth on behalf of Xiang Weiyi, the 2-year-old survivor who was orphaned in the crash.

== Investigation ==
On 28 December 2011 the official accident investigation report presented to the State Council was released to the public. According to this report, the accident occurred due to severe defects in the design of control center equipment, lax equipment inspection and failure to adequately respond to equipment malfunction caused by lightning. The report names 54 officials as bearing responsibility for the accident and the botched rescue effort. The most senior official implicated in the report is former minister Liu Zhijun, who had been detained on corruption charges before the accident, but nonetheless is accused of improperly raising the operating speed of the Ningbo-Taizhou-Wenzhou Railway and compressing the construction schedule of the railway, which resulted in curtailed safety inspection of the line. He is also blamed for failing to assign proper duties to a newly created office within the MOR to oversee passenger-dedicated high-speed railway lines, failing to resolve bureaucratic overlap in the oversight of HSR safety within the Ministry that weakened regulatory oversight, and failing to direct subordinates to institute proper review and inspection procedures for newly developed signaling equipment, which led the defective LKD2-T1 signal equipment to be put into operation. Other senior MOR officials cited include deputy minister Lu Dongfu, MOR chief engineer He Huawu and former MOR deputy chief engineer Zhang Shuguang.

The report also assigns fault to executives and engineers of the China Railway Signal & Communications Corp., which designed, produced and installed the defective equipment, executives of the Jingfu Railway (Anhui) Corporation, which permitted the faulty equipment to be installed improperly in breach of the contractual terms. Numerous officials of the Shanghai Railway Bureau, which operates the line, are also singled out for blame including former bureau chief Long Jing, who was fired shortly after the accident, as well as deputy bureau chief, Wang Feng, who ordered that wrecked train carriages be buried in pits dug on-site. The chief and deputy chief of Wenzhou South Station are faulted for inadequate oversight of employees. Among the most junior persons cited is Zang Kai, a worker at Wenzhou South Station who discovered signal failure on the D3212 Train but, in breach of protocol, failed to file a log report of the malfunction and did not communicate with the D301 Train.

== Reaction ==
=== Wang Yongping's press conference ===
"Whether or not you believe [this explanation], I believe it."

— Wang Yongping, Ministry of Railways spokesman

On orders from the authorities, the rescue effort concluded less than a day following the accident, and the damaged train cars were seen being broken apart by backhoes and buried nearby. The Railway Ministry justified the burial by claiming that the trains contained valuable "national level" technology that could be stolen. However, hours after the rescuers had been told to stop searching for survivors, a 2-year-old girl was found alive in the wreckage.

Chinese media was especially skeptical of the rescue efforts, particularly the burial of trains. In a press conference, the spokesman of the Railway Ministry, Wang Yongping, said that the burial was for facilitating the rescue work. The answer prompted heckling and gasps of disbelief from the journalists assembled. Wang then said to a journalist, "whether or not you believe [this explanation], I believe it." ("至于你信不信，我反正信了.") This phrase eventually became an internet meme. When asked why a little girl was found after the rescue work had been announced finished, Wang said, "This was a miracle. We did find a living girl in the work thereafter. That was what happened." ("这是一个奇迹。我们确实在后面的工作当中发现了一个活着的女孩，事情就是这个样子.") Images of the wreckage being shovelled into the pits were circulated widely on the Internet, and led to speculation over a possible mishandling by the government or concealing evidence crucial for the ongoing investigation.

=== Chinese media ===
"If nobody can be safe, do we still want this speed? Can we drink a glass of milk that's safe? Can we stay in an apartment that will not fall apart? Can the roads we travel on in our cities not collapse? Can we travel in safe trains? And if and when a major accident does happen, can we not be in a hurry to bury the trains?"

— Qiu Qiming, CCTV current affairs anchor

Despite reported directives from the Publicity Department, Chinese media, both independent and state-owned, directly criticized the Ministry of Railways and voiced their skepticism of the government. Such challenges to officially sanctioned orthodoxy were bold and rare, particularly on programs aired on China's state-owned television.

In one instance, in response to Wang Yongping's assurance at the press conference that the Chinese railway system was running on "advanced technology", news anchor Bai Yansong retorted on China Central Television, "The technology may be advanced, but is your management advanced? Are your standard operating procedures advanced? Is the supervision advanced? Is your respect for people advanced? Are all the minute details advanced? At the end of the day, is your overall operational capability advanced?"

Similarly, Qiu Qiming of CCTV program 24-Hours launched into an on-air tirade about Chinese society: "If nobody can be safe, do we still want this speed? Can we drink a glass of milk that's safe? Can we stay in an apartment that will not fall apart? Can the roads we travel on in our cities not collapse? Can we travel in safe trains? And if and when a major accident does happen, can we not be in a hurry to bury the trains? Can we afford the people a basic sense of security? China, please slow down. If you're too fast, you may leave the souls of your people behind."

Qi Qixin, a professor at the Transportation Research Institute of Beijing University of Technology, remarked that "the problem may have come from the mistakes of dispatching management, instead of technological failure," and "The system should have an ability to automatically issue a warning or even stop a train under such circumstances," in a press release. Ren Xianfang, senior analyst at IHS Global Insight in Beijing, said that the pace of development in China had been "phenomenal", but warned it could not be sustained in the long run.

The driver of the crashed train, Pan Yiheng, was hailed as a hero in some quarters on 26 July, for preventing the disaster from becoming worse. He tried to brake the train to keep it from crashing into the rear of the train ahead; he was killed when the brake handle pierced his chest in the crash. It has been stated that had he not acted, at least one more train car would have been derailed, likely increasing the death toll.

=== Online communities ===
Internet users were skeptical that the crash was caused by a natural disaster, instead blaming officials, with one frequently forwarded comment on Sina Weibo microblogging service stating "When a country is so corrupt that one lightning strike can cause a train crash ... none of us are exempt. China today is a train rushing through a lightning storm ... we are all passengers".

MOR Spokesman Wang Yongping gained particular notoriety online, with netizens parodying his various statements and attacking his credibility and character. Numerous cartoons, and even a music video ridiculing him, appeared. On 16 August, he was dismissed from the Ministry of Railways, ostensibly because of his botched handling of the press conference. Wang endured severe stress throughout the negative publicity online, and he was eventually transferred to a position at the Organization for Cooperation of Railways in Poland on 18 August. In reaction, a web post commented sarcastically "Quick! Sell all your Polish high-speed rail stocks!" Some commentators defended Wang, saying he was merely a scapegoat in a corrupt system. Netizen activity about the crash was also examined.

=== Stock markets ===
Shares in CSR Corp., which built one of the two trains in a joint venture with Canada's Bombardier Inc, fell by 14%, while China Automation Group Ltd., which was responsible for the design and production of the safety and control systems for railways, saw its shares fall by 19% in Hong Kong on 24 and 25 July. China Rail Construction, builder of more than half of the nation's rail links since 1949, fell 6.7%. Shares in China Railway Group also temporarily slid down 7.7%. The high-speed rail woes added to negative market sentiment from the US debt deadlock, sending the Shanghai Composite Index down 3 per cent to 2,688.75. CNR shares fell 9.7%.

=== Overseas ===
An official at Saudi Railways Organization, the kingdom's train network operator, declined to comment on the Chinese crash or whether it might affect the company's decision to award a part of a 2009 $1.8 billion rail contract to a Chinese company. Edwin Merner, the president of Atlantis Investment Research Corp. in Tokyo, reckoned the crash would cause a temporary loss of trust in Chinese railway technology.

The crash drew sharp contrasts between China and Japan, with both Chinese online commentators and international publications pointing out that Japan has never experienced a crash on its high-speed rail lines, despite being in operation for over forty years. Many Japanese experts zoomed in on the accident, which was headlined on the front page in almost all major Japanese newspapers the morning after it occurred. In an editorial titled "Chinese government must stop cover-ups, trivializing life", the Daily Yomiuri called for the national overhaul of signaling systems and lauded the role of social media. The Economist editorialized strongly against the Chinese government, asserting that the accident has "shown the limits of dictatorship." At Miller-McCune, Shank and Wasserstrom opined that the crash marks a serious "legitimacy crisis" for the Chinese government and could mark the end of a "confident era." David Bandurski wrote in the International Herald Tribune that the accident and its response was "emblematic of a callous, unresponsive political culture that prioritizes instant results over public well-being and accountability." Bandurski called China's high-speed rail development an unsustainable venture mired by political intrigue, corruption, and a 'Great Leap Forward'-style mentality.

Conversely, Robert Zeliger of Foreign Policy drew comparisons between China's railway safety record and those of India and the United States. Citing journalist Lloyd Lofthouse, Zeliger points out that between 2007 and the time of the Wenzhou crash, 20% of the 177 accidents during this period actually occurred in the United States, 15% in India, and only 4% in China. He highlighted the much higher death toll of accidents on India's railways. Meanwhile, the Hindustan Times, while criticizing the Chinese government's response, recognized the need for India to "learn from" China's accident and apply further scrutiny to its own rail networks.

=== Aftermath ===
As of November 2025, the crash has remained the only serious accident on the Chinese high-speed rail network, which now accounts for two-thirds of the world's total high-speed railways, carries over 2 billion passengers every year and still is undergoing large-scale expansion.

=== Academic analysis ===
Modelling of the accident has been published.

== See also ==
- List of rail accidents (2010–2019)
- Szczekociny rail crash
- Tempi train crash
- Toledo rail crash, another collision on a high-speed railway line after a control centre authorisation to proceed during a signal failure
