= National Railway Administration =

Chinese government ministry

- 国家铁路局
- National emblem of China

Agency overview
- Formed: 14 March 2013; 13 years ago
- Preceding agency: Ministry of Railways
- Jurisdiction: China
- Headquarters: 6 Fuxing Road, Haidian, Beijing
- Agency executive: TBA
- Parent agency: Ministry of Transport
- Website: nra.gov.cn

The National Railway Administration (NRA, Chinese: 国家铁路局) is the national railway regulator of China under the Ministry of Transport. It was established in 2013 with the breakup of the Ministry of Railways; the China Railway was created to operate the railway network while the Administration was created to regulate and oversee the corporation. The current director is Fei Dongbin.

== History ==
In 2013, the State Council of China broke up the Ministry of Railways and separated the functions of railway operation and regulation. The China Railway Corporation was created to operate the railway network, while the National Railway Administration was created to regulate and oversee the corporation, with safety and accident prevention being a major part of its function.

== Functions ==
The NRA oversees the largest railway network in Asia and the largest high-speed railway network in the world. The densities of the network's passenger and freight transport are among the world's highest. It has seven regional oversight bureaus, based in Shenyang, Shanghai, Guangzhou, Chengdu, Wuhan, Xi'an, and Lanzhou, respectively, which oversee 18 regional railway companies (formerly regional bureaus) of the China Railway Corporation.

The NRA administers China's no-ride list.

== Leadership ==
=== Directors ===
| Name | Chinese name | Took office | Left office | Ref. |
|---|---|---|---|---|
| Lu Dongfu | 陆东福 | 19 March 2013 | 16 October 2016 | |
| Yang Yudong | 杨宇栋 | December 2016 | December 2018 | |
| Liu Zhenfang | 刘振芳 | November 2019 | July 2022 | |
| Fei Dongbin | 费东斌 | October 2022 | June 2025 | . |

== See also ==
- List of national railway administrations
