= Fu Zhihuan =

Chinese politician

Fu Zhihuan (Chinese: 傅志寰; pinyin: Fù Zhìhuán; born March 1938) is a politician of the People's Republic of China, and an academician of the Chinese Academy of Engineering. He served as the Minister of Railways of China from March 1998 to 2003.

Fu was a member of 15th Central Committee of the Chinese Communist Party.

Government offices
Preceded by Han Zhubin	Minister of Railways of the People's Republic of China; 1998 – 2003	Succeeded by Liu Zhijun
