= List of national railway administrations =

This is a list of national railway administrations. This list does not include state-owned operators that are not part of the government.

== East Asia ==
- National Railway Administration (China)
- Taiwan Railways Administration

== South Asia ==
- Ministry of Railways (India)
- Ministry of Railways (Pakistan)

== North America ==
- Federal Railroad Administration (United States)

== Europe ==
- Norwegian National Rail Administration (Norway)
- Polish State Railways (Poland)
  - PKP Polskie Linie Kolejowe
- Swedish Rail Administration (Sweden)
- Network Rail (United Kingdom)

== Sources ==
- Bhakta, Mira (12 August 2026). "Freight railroads lose challenge to crew size rule". The Hill.
- Gordon-Farleigh, Neve (27 August 2026). "Passengers face rail disruption for track replacements". BBC News. Archived from the original on 29 August 2026 – via Yahoo News.
