= Liu Zhijun =

Chinese politician

- 刘志军
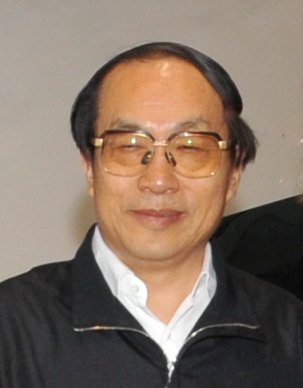

Minister of Railways
- In office 17 March 2003 – 25 February 2011
- Premier: Wen Jiabao
- Preceded by: Fu Zhihuan
- Succeeded by: Sheng Guangzu

Personal details
- Born: 29 January 1953 (age 73) Ezhou, Hubei
- Profession: Railway systems engineering

Liu Zhijun (simplified Chinese: 刘志军; traditional Chinese: 劉志軍; pinyin: Liú Zhìjūn; born 29 January 1953) is a former Chinese politician who served as the Minister of Railways.

Liu was a peasant's son who left school in his teens to take a job as a low-level bureaucrat in the Railway Ministry. He rose rapidly within the Ministry, eventually heading several regional railway departments and serving as vice-minister before being promoted to the head of the Railway Ministry in 2003.

As Railway Minister, Liu oversaw numerous expansions of China's railway system, most notably the rapid development of China's high-speed railway. He was a figure of national praise until February 2011, when he was arrested and expelled from the Party over allegations of corruption. After the Wenzhou train collision in July 2011, in which forty people died and one hundred and ninety-two people were injured, a government report singled out his leadership as one of the main contributors to the crash and he was publicly criticized.

In April 2013, Liu was arrested on corruption charges for taking over 64 million yuan in bribes and abusing his power as Minister of Railways. He was convicted and received a death sentence with reprieve in July 2013. On 14 December 2015, Liu Zhijun's sentence was statutorily commuted to life imprisonment. The prison authorities said that he was expressing repentance and had committed no intentional offences during the reprieve period.

== Career ==
=== Early career ===
Liu was born in Huarong, Hubei. His father was a farmer, and he grew up in the villages around Hunan. When he was a teenager, in 1972, he left school and took a job as a low-level bureaucrat in the national ministry of railways. He joined the Chinese Communist Party (CCP) the next year, in August 1973. While working at the rail ministry he became a trusted letter-writer for some of his more poorly-educated superiors within the ministry, and in 1974, when he was twenty-one, he married into a politically well-connected family.

Liu graduated from the Party School of the CCP (a university established specifically to educate Party leaders) in July 1988, majoring in Marxist Philosophy. Liu continued his education, later earning a master's degree in engineering from the Party School. Liu ascended through the ranks of the rail ministry swiftly, and before running the entire ministry served two separate, subsequent terms as the director of two regional railway bureaus, in Liaoning and in Henan. He became a member of the CCP Central Committee during its sixteenth congress, in 2002.

=== Minister of Railways ===
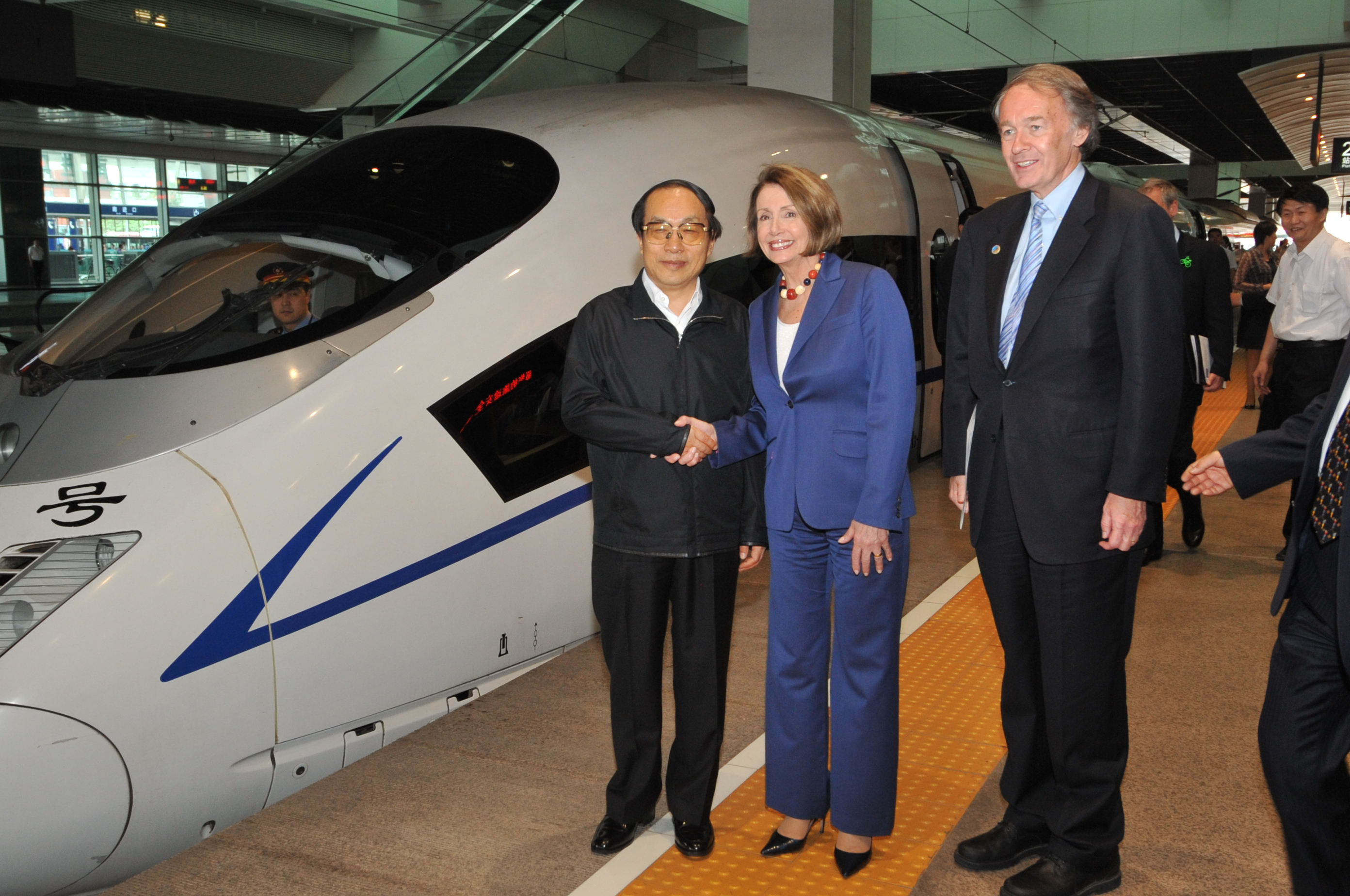
Liu with Speaker Nancy Pelosi and Rep. Ed Markey, of the US House of Representatives in May 2009. Behind them is a Hexie Hao train on the Beijing–Tianjin Intercity Railway.

Liu was promoted to vice-minister, and later succeeded then-Minister Fu Zhihuan as Minister of Railways in March 2003 at the annual meeting of the National People's Congress. At the time that Liu was made Minister of Railways, the Ministry of Railways was the second most powerful ministry in China (second to the military). It had its own police, judges, and courts, and had a budget of billions of dollars. After being named minister, Liu announced plans to dramatically expand China's then-underdeveloped railway system by building 7,500 miles of new high-speed railway tracks, more than could be found in the rest of the world combined. The central government supported Liu's plans, and allocated Liu a budget of over two hundred and fifty billion dollars (over several years). This made Liu's plan the world's most well-funded public infrastructure project since the American president Ike Eisenhower constructed the American Interstate Highway System in the 1950s. In order to complete China's first high-speed rail line before the end of 2008, Liu led the Railway Ministry's employees to work around the clock. His habit of telling people that "To achieve a great leap, an entire generation must be sacrificed" earned him the nickname "Great Leap Liu". (Some of his detractors also called him "Lunatic Liu" for the pace of his work). While developing China's high-speed rail system, Liu also oversaw comprehensive upgrades of China's standard rail system, and he oversaw the opening of the Qinghai-Tibet Railway, the world's highest railway by elevation, but he regarded the development of China's high-speed rail system as his favourite project.

When China's first high-speed rail system completed its first test-run in June 2008 it was 75 per cent over budget, but was hailed in the Chinese media as an achievement worthy of national pride. Liu described his achievement as having created a network with a comprehensive system involving indigenous Chinese intellectual property. He stated that China had created a high-speed railway system that had the "greatest comprehensive technology, best integrative ability, highest operational distance, fastest operational speed, and largest scale of construction" in the world. (In reality the rail system was largely based on German and Japanese designs). Shortly after Liu's completion of China's first high-speed rail line, in the autumn of 2008, the Chinese government more than doubled Liu's ministry's budget (as part of an effort to mitigate the Great Recession), and gave him the responsibility laying ten thousand miles of high-speed rail track by 2020: five times the size of America's first transcontinental route. By 2010 Liu's budget was over one hundred billion dollars (US). In 2011, the American president, Barack Obama, cited Liu's high-speed rail system as evidence that American infrastructure was no longer the best in the world.

In 2009 Liu gave a public lecture in which he voiced his opinion that, in order to avoid rising costs due to China's high rate of inflation, his ministry must "seize the opportunity, build more railways, and build them fast." Before 2011 the Railway Ministry acted as its own regulator and was virtually unsupervised by the central government. Liu personally attempted to intimidate academics critical of the pace of the high-speed railway's construction, and ignored Japanese warnings that his trains were being operated at speeds 25% greater than what was considered safe in Japan.

== Criticism, investigation, and fall ==
During his tenure, Liu's ministry was criticized for its illegitimate business interests and relationships with large companies, its inability to improve conditions for migrant workers during the Chinese New Year travel season, its slow response to widespread winter storms in 2008, and its failures to prevent the 2008 train collision in Shandong and a smaller collision in Hunan a year later. In addition, Liu was personally subject to online criticism for his repeated marriages. Illegal subcontracting was a common practice throughout Liu's tenure as head of the rail ministry, so that much of the staff who built the railway were poorly educated, trained, and supplied.

Liu was criticized within China for arranging a high-level position within the ministry for his brother, Liu Zhixiang. In January 2005 Liu Zhixiang was arrested for embezzlement, bribe-taking, and arranging the killing of a contractor intent on exposing him. Before being arrested, Liu Zhixiang was able to amass a fortune equivalent to US$50 million in cash, real estate comprising 374 properties, jewelry, and art. He was sentenced to death, but this sentence was suspended and reduced to sixteen years in jail, after which he was transferred to a hospital to serve his sentence there. While serving his sentence in hospital he reportedly continued to conduct rail business by phone.

In February 2011 Liu Zhijun was placed under investigation for alleged "severe violations of discipline" by the Chinese Central Commission for Discipline Inspection (CCDI). According to the CCDI and the Chinese Ministry of Supervision, the reason for the investigation was that Liu was suspected of abusing his position to receive very large bribes. Investigators began to act after concluding that Liu was planning to use his illegal fortune in order to bribe his way into the Communist Party Central Committee, and eventually into the Politburo. Shortly following the announcement of the investigation, Liu was dismissed from his position as party chief of the ministry on 12 February. (Note: Note that while Liu was removed from his party post as chief of the ministry, Liu nominally retained the government position of Minister of Railways, until his removal was confirmed later in 2011 by the Standing Committee of the National People's Congress. This was merely a procedural confirmation that served as a formality.) The allegations of corruption against him led to his dismissal as Minister on 25 February 2011.

His dismissal was linked to an earlier corruption case involving Shanxi business magnate Ding Yuxin (former name Ding Shumiao) of Boyou Investment Management Group Ltd., a company whose portfolio benefited greatly from China's rapid high-speed rail construction. Just prior to his dismissal Liu had traveled over 7,000 miles across China, from 30 January to 8 February, inspecting China's railways in order to ensure smooth operations during the subsequent Chinese New Year travel season. His downfall came suddenly and unexpectedly. At the time of his dismissal, the international media considered Liu the highest-level Party official to be prosecuted for corruption since Chen Liangyu lost his post as Party Chief of Shanghai in 2006.

Liu was expelled from the Chinese Communist Party in May 2011 for "severe violations of discipline" and "primary leadership responsibilities for the serious corruption problem within the railway system". The Chinese state press alleged that Liu took an illegal 4% commission on railway deals, and that he had accumulated over two hundred and fifty million dollars in bribes. The CCP later accused him of "sexual misconduct", a revelation which surprised many who had followed Liu's career. The Hong Kong-based newspaper Ming Pao repeated this report, alleging that Liu kept eighteen mistresses.

In July 2011, while Liu was still under investigation, the Wenzhou train collision, in which a faulty signal box led to the deaths of forty people and injured one hundred and ninety-two, exposed him to further accusations of systematic corruption and incompetence within his Rail Ministry. The Railway Ministry unsuccessfully attempted to cover up the details of the crash, but lingering public criticism led Prime Minister Wen Jiabao to visit the crash site shortly after the incident, where he promised a full, public government investigation and justice for those found responsible. The government released its findings in December 2011, in which it acknowledged and blamed the disaster on "serious design flaws", "a neglect of safety management", and flaws in the bidding and testing processes used to acquire materials. The report publicly blamed fifty-four private and government figures for the disaster, the most prominent of which was Liu Zhijun.

Following the December report, Liu's name became a byword for "a broken system". He was put on trial in 2013 and received a death sentence with reprieve in July 2013. After his fall in 2011, Chinese government censors removed and/or blocked within China the many glowing reviews of his government service which had accumulated over his career, so that now only the details of his arrest remain available within China.

On 14 December 2015, Liu Zhijun's sentence was commuted to life imprisonment. The prison authorities said that he was expressing repentance and had committed no intentional offences during the reprieve period.

== Notes ==
Government offices
Preceded by Fu Zhihuan	Minister of Railways of the People's Republic of China; 2003 – 2011	Succeeded by Sheng Guangzu
