= Ministry of Railways (China) =

Former Chinese government ministry

Ministry of Railways of the People's Republic of China
- 中华人民共和国铁道部

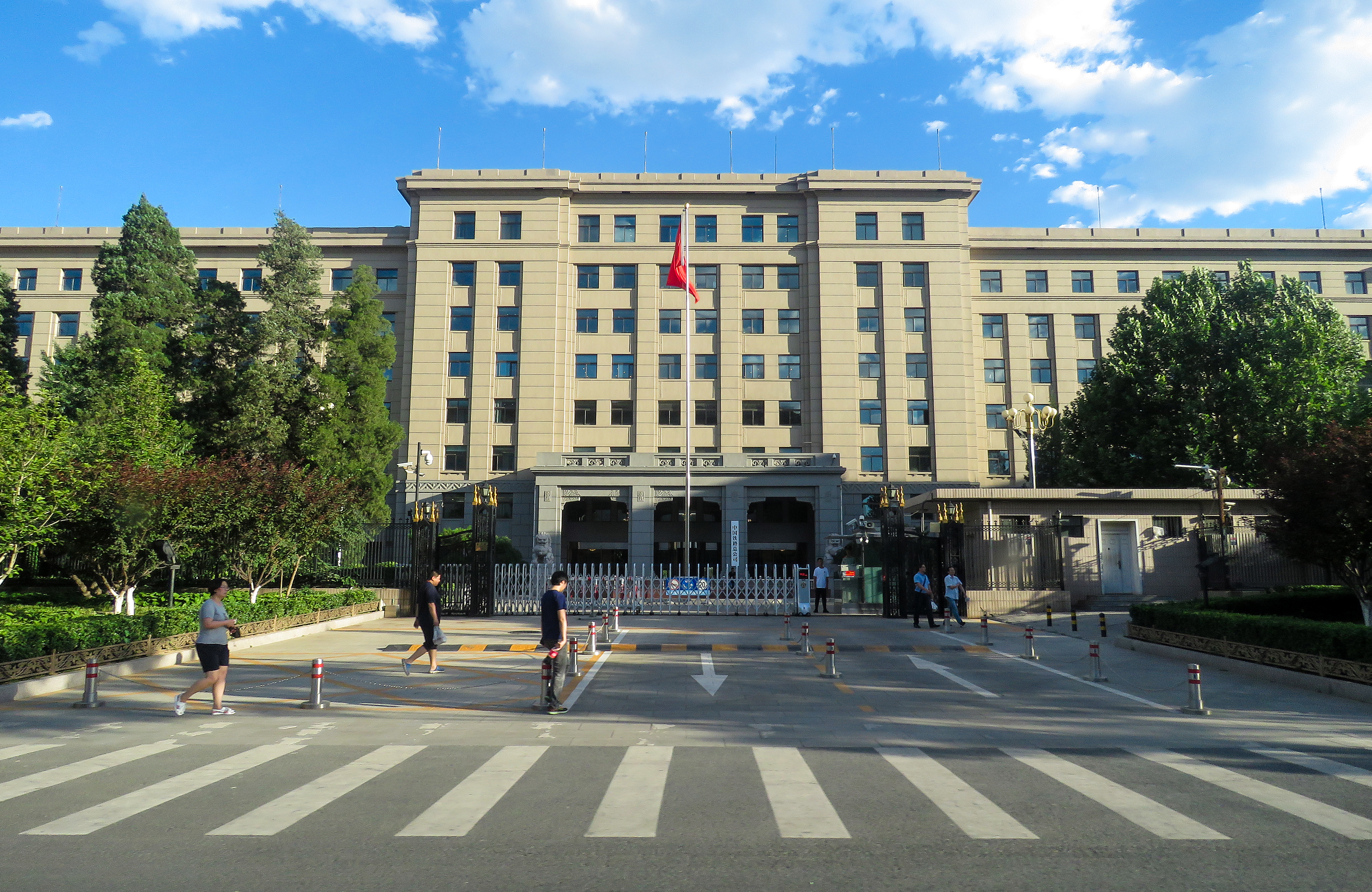
- Headquarters of the former Ministry of Railways, now used by China State Railway Group

Agency overview
- Formed: 1 October 1949; 77 years ago
- Dissolved: March 2013; 13 years ago
- Superseding agencies: Ministry of Transport; National Railway Administration; China Railway Corporation
- Type: Constituent Department of the State Council (cabinet-level)
- Jurisdiction: China
- Headquarters: Beijing
- Parent agency: State Council
- Website: china-mor.gov.cn (archived)

The Ministry of Railways (MOR) was a constituent department of the State Council of the People's Republic of China.

The ministry was responsible for passenger services, regulation of the rail industry, development of the rail network and rail infrastructure in mainland China. The ministry was also in charge of the operations of China Railway which manages the railway bureaux and companies in mainland China.

On 10 March 2013, it was announced that the Ministry would be dissolved and its duties taken up by the Ministry of Transport (safety and regulation), National Railway Administration (inspection) and China Railway Corporation (construction and management), in part addressing concerns about calls for independent supervision of the rail industry. It was dissolved that year.

== History ==
The Ministry's railway building was important in China's national industrialization campaigns, mass mobilization, and military logistics. Academic Elisabeth Köll writes that during the Mao era, the Ministry's railways "represented the speed, economic efficiency, punctuality, discipline, technological advances, professionalism, dedication, and heroism necessary to promote the ideals of the party and the government at large."

In 1989, the state took assets out of the Ministry of Railways and incorporated them to form a state-owned enterprise, the China Railway Engineering Corporation.

On 10 March 2013, it was announced that the Ministry would be dissolved and its duties taken up by the Ministry of Transport (safety and regulation), National Railway Administration (inspection) and China Railway Corporation (construction and management), in part addressing concerns about calls for independent supervision of the rail industry. The last minister was Sheng Guangzu.

== Rail bonds ==
MOR, acting as a corporation in the debt market, has sold 60 billion yuan of bonds in 2007.

For the year 2009, MOR planned to sell at least 100 billion yuan ($14.6 billion) worth of construction bonds to finance a large expansion of the country's rail network.

== Railway bureaus and companies ==
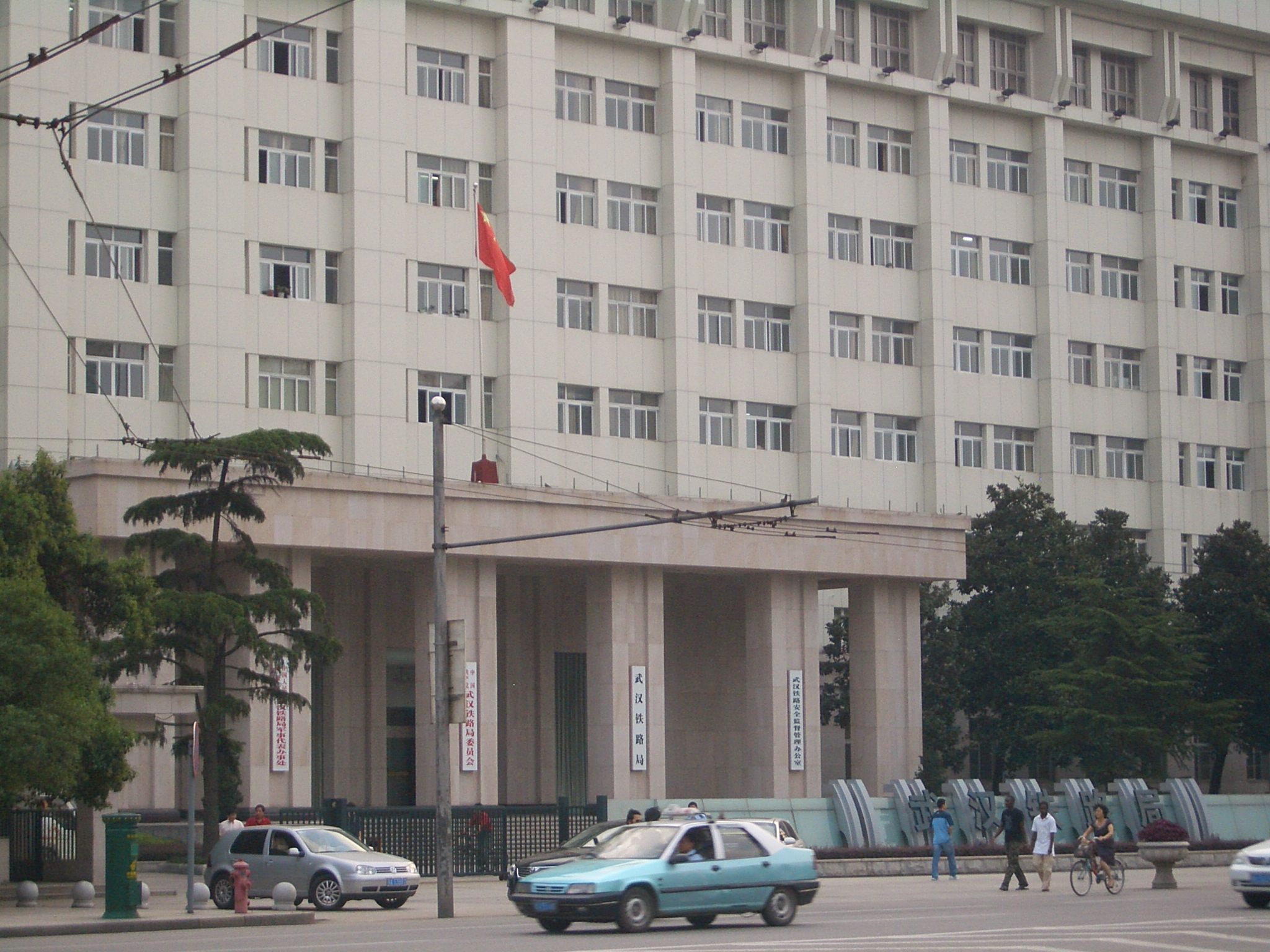
The Wuhan Railway Bureau headquarters

There were 16 railway bureaux and 2 railway group companies under the Ministry of Railways. As of 2008, approximately 2 million people worked in the Ministry of Railways.

Bureau or Agency	Railway Network in Provinces
Beijing Railway Bureau	Beijing, Hebei, Tianjin, Shanxi (part)
Chengdu Railway Bureau	Sichuan, Chongqing
Guangzhou Railway Group Co., Ltd.	Guangdong, Hunan
Harbin Railway Bureau	Heilongjiang, Inner Mongolia (part)
Hohhot Railway Bureau	Inner Mongolia (part)
Jinan Railway Bureau	Shandong, Liaoning (part)
Kunming Railway Bureau	Yunnan, Sichuan, Guizhou
Lanzhou Railway Bureau	Gansu, Ningxia
Nanchang Railway Bureau	Jiangxi, Fujian
Nanning Railway Bureau	Guangxi, Guangdong (part)
Qinghai-Tibet Railway Group Co., Ltd.	Qinghai, Tibet
Shanghai Railway Bureau	Shanghai, Jiangsu, Anhui, Zhejiang
Shenyang Railway Bureau	Liaoning, Jilin, Heilongjiang (part), Inner Mongolia (part)
Taiyuan Railway Bureau	Shanxi
Wulumuqi Railway Bureau	Xinjiang
Wuhan Railway Bureau	Hubei
Xi'an Railway Bureau	Shaanxi, Gansu, Ningxia, Hubei
Zhengzhou Railway Bureau	Hubei (part), Shaanxi, Shandong

== List of Railway Ministers ==
No.	Name	Took office	Left office
1	Teng Daiyuan	October 1949	January 1965
2	Lü Zhengcao	January 1965	1966
Post abolished
3	Wan Li	January 1975	December 1976
4	Duan Junyi	December 1976	March 1978
5	Guo Weicheng	March 1978	1981
6	Liu Jianzhang	1981	April 1982
7	Chen Puru	April 1982	1985
8	Ding Guangen	1985	April 1988
9	Li Senmao	April 1988	1992
10	Han Zhubin	1992	March 1998
11	Fu Zhihuan	March 1998	March 2003
12	Liu Zhijun	March 2003	February 2011
13	Sheng Guangzu	February 2011	16 March 2013

== See also ==
- China Railway Museum
- Liu Zhijun
