= List of presidents of China =

This is a list of the heads of state of the Republic of China (ROC) since 1912 and the state representatives of the People's Republic of China (PRC) since 1949.

== List of presidents of the Republic of China (since 1912) ==
This is a list of the presidents of the Republic of China (ROC) (1912–present). The Republic of China president is called 總統 (Zǒngtǒng, "President"), and from 1912–1928, 大總統 (Dàzǒngtǒng, "Grand President").

Since 1949, the de facto territory of the ROC is reduced to Taiwan and its surrounding islands, the former previously ruled by Japan from 1895 to 1945, no longer governing mainland China. It continued to represent China in the United Nations until it was expelled on 25 October 1971 and diplomatically by the United States government until 1 January 1979. The President of the ROC is also known as the President of Taiwan due to the territory it governs.

Provisional Government:
Tongmenghui
Beiyang clique, etc.
Beiyang Government:
Beiyang clique, etc. Progressive Party/Research Clique Communications Clique
Nationalist to Constitutional Government:
Kuomintang Democratic Progressive Party

=== Presidents of the Provisional Government ===
No.	Portrait	Name (Birth–Death)	Term of office		Political party	Vice President	Assembly (elected)
1		Sun Yat-sen 孫中山 (1866–1925)	1 January 1912	10 March 1912	Tongmenghui	Li Yuanhong (Independent)	Provisional (1911)
2		Yuan Shikai 袁世凱 (1859–1916)	10 March 1912	10 October 1913	Beiyang clique	Li Yuanhong (Independent)	Provisional (1912)
=== Presidents of the Beiyang Government ===
No.	Portrait	Name (Birth–Death)	Term of office		Political party	Vice President	Assembly (elected)
1		Yuan Shikai 袁世凱 (1859–1916)	10 October 1913	6 June 1916 (Note: Proclaimed a new empire from 12 December 1915 to 22 March 1916.) (Note: Died in office.)	Beiyang clique	Li Yuanhong (Progressive)	1st (1913)
2		Li Yuanhong 黎元洪 (1864–1928)	7 June 1916	17 July 1917 (Note: Zhang Xun briefly restored the Qing Empire from 1 July to 12 July in 1917.) (Note: Forced out of office.)	Progressive Party	Feng Guozhang (Zhili clique)	1st (1913)
—		Feng Guozhang 馮國璋 (1859–1919) (acting) (Note: As Vice President.)	17 July 1917	10 October 1918	Zhili clique	Vacant	1st (1913)
3		Xu Shichang 徐世昌 (1855–1939)	10 October 1918	2 June 1922	Anhui clique (Anfu Club)	Vacant	2nd (1918)
—		Zhou Ziqi 周自齊 (1871–1923) (acting) (Note: As Acting Premier.)	2 June 1922	11 June 1922	Communications Clique	Vacant	2nd (1918)
(2)		Li Yuanhong 黎元洪 (1864–1928)	11 June 1922	13 June 1923	Research Clique	Vacant	2nd (1918)
—		Gao Lingwei 高凌霨 (1868–1939) (acting) (Note: As Premier.)	14 June 1923	10 October 1923	Zhili clique	Vacant	2nd (1918)
4		Cao Kun 曹錕 (1862–1938)	10 October 1923	2 November 1924	Zhili clique	Vacant	(1923)
—		Huang Fu 黃郛 (1883–1936) (acting)	2 November 1924	24 November 1924	Political Science Clique	Vacant	(1923)
5		Duan Qirui (Note: Provisional Chief Executive instead of President.) 段祺瑞 (1865–1936)	24 November 1924	20 April 1926	Anhui clique (Anfu Club)	Vacant	(1923)
5		Duan Qirui 段祺瑞 (1865–1936)	24 November 1924	20 April 1926	Anhui clique (Anfu Club)	Vacant	Vacant
—		Hu Weide (Note: Acting Provisional Chief Executive instead of Acting President.) 胡惟德 (1863–1933) (acting)	20 April 1926	13 May 1926	Zhili clique	Vacant	Vacant
—		Yan Huiqing (W.W. Yan) 顏惠慶 (1877–1950) (acting)	13 May 1926	22 June 1926	Nonpartisan	Vacant	Vacant
—		Du Xigui 杜錫珪 (1875–1933) (acting)	22 June 1926	1 October 1926	Zhili clique	Vacant	Vacant
—		V. K. Wellington Koo 顧維鈞 (1888–1985) (acting)	1 October 1926	17 June 1927 (Note: Resigned.)	Nonpartisan	Vacant	Vacant
6		Zhang Zuolin (Note: Zhang was the Generalissimo of the Beiyang Military Government instead of President.) 張作霖 (1875–1928)	18 June 1927	4 June 1928 (Note: Assassinated.)	Fengtian clique	Vacant	Vacant
=== Chairman of the Nationalist Government === Note: (Note: Alternatively translated as "President of the National Government" on occasions of formality in various historical sources.)
No.	Portrait	Name (Note: The Chairman of the Nationalist Government (國民政府) was the head of state in this period (political tutelage; 訓政時期). There was no office of Vice Chairman.) (Birth–Death)	Term of office		Political party	Assembly (elected)	
1		Tan Yankai 譚延闓 (1880–1930)	7 February 1928	10 October 1928	Kuomintang	2nd National Congress of Kuomintang (4th plenum)	
2		Chiang Kai-shek 蔣中正 (1887–1975)	10 October 1928	15 December 1931	Kuomintang	2nd National Congress of Kuomintang (5th plenum)	
—		Lin Sen 林森 (1868–1943)	15 December 1931 (Note: Assumed office as acting chairman from 15 December 1931 to 1 January 1932.)	1 August 1943	Kuomintang	2nd National Congress of Kuomintang (5th plenum)	
3		Lin Sen 林森 (1868–1943)	15 December 1931	1 August 1943	Kuomintang	4th National Congress of Kuomintang (1st plenum)	
—		Chiang Kai-shek 蔣中正 (1887–1975)	1 August 1943 (Note: Assumed office as acting chairman from 1 June to 1o October 1943.)	20 May 1948	Kuomintang	4th National Congress of Kuomintang (1st plenum)	
4		Chiang Kai-shek 蔣中正 (1887–1975)	1 August 1943	20 May 1948	Kuomintang	5th National Congress of Kuomintang (11th plenum)	
=== Presidents after the 1947 Constitution ===
No.	Portrait	Name (Birth–Death)	Term of office		Political party	Vice President	Term (elected)
1		Chiang Kai-shek 蔣中正 (1887–1975)	20 May 1948	21 January 1949 (Note: Declared incapacity.)	Kuomintang	Li Zongren (Kuomintang)	1 (1948)
—		Li Zongren 李宗仁 (1890–1969) (acting)	21 January 1949	20 November 1949	Kuomintang	Vacant	1 (1948)
—		Yan Xishan 閻錫山 (1883–1960) (acting)	20 November 1949	1 March 1950	Kuomintang	Vacant	1 (1948)
(1)		Chiang Kai-shek 蔣中正 (1887–1975)	1 March 1950	5 April 1975	Kuomintang	Li Zongren (Note: Vice-President from 1948 to 1954; impeached and recalled in 1954.) (Kuomintang)	1 (1948)
(1)		Chiang Kai-shek 蔣中正 (1887–1975)	1 March 1950	5 April 1975	Kuomintang	Vacant	1 (1948)
(1)		Chiang Kai-shek 蔣中正 (1887–1975)	1 March 1950	5 April 1975	Kuomintang	Chen Cheng (Note: Died on 5 March 1965.) (Kuomintang)	2 (1954)
(1)		Chiang Kai-shek 蔣中正 (1887–1975)	1 March 1950	5 April 1975	Kuomintang	Chen Cheng (Kuomintang)	3 (1960)
(1)		Chiang Kai-shek 蔣中正 (1887–1975)	1 March 1950	5 April 1975	Kuomintang	Vacant	3 (1960)
(1)		Chiang Kai-shek 蔣中正 (1887–1975)	1 March 1950	5 April 1975	Kuomintang	Yen Chia-kan (Kuomintang)	4 (1966)
(1)		Chiang Kai-shek 蔣中正 (1887–1975)	1 March 1950	5 April 1975	Kuomintang	Yen Chia-kan (Kuomintang)	5 (1972)
2		Yen Chia-kan (C. K. Yen) 嚴家淦 (1905–1993)	5 April 1975	20 May 1978	Kuomintang	Vacant	5 (1972)
3		Chiang Ching-kuo 蔣經國 (1910–1988)	20 May 1978	13 January 1988	Kuomintang	Hsieh Tung-min (Kuomintang)	6 (1978)
3		Chiang Ching-kuo 蔣經國 (1910–1988)	20 May 1978	13 January 1988	Kuomintang	Lee Teng-hui (Kuomintang)	7 (1984)
4		Lee Teng-hui 李登輝 (1923–2020)	13 January 1988	20 May 2000	Kuomintang	Vacant	7 (1984)
4		Lee Teng-hui 李登輝 (1923–2020)	13 January 1988	20 May 2000	Kuomintang	Lee Yuan-tsu (Kuomintang)	8 (1990)
4		Lee Teng-hui 李登輝 (1923–2020)	13 January 1988	20 May 2000	Kuomintang	Lien Chan (Kuomintang)	9 (1996)
5		Chen Shui-bian 陳水扁 (born 1950)	20 May 2000	20 May 2008	Democratic Progressive	Annette Lu (DPP)	10 (2000)
5		Chen Shui-bian 陳水扁 (born 1950)	20 May 2000	20 May 2008	Democratic Progressive	Annette Lu (DPP)	11 (2004)
6		Ma Ying-jeou 馬英九 (born 1950)	20 May 2008	20 May 2016	Kuomintang	Vincent Siew (Kuomintang)	12 (2008)
6		Ma Ying-jeou 馬英九 (born 1950)	20 May 2008	20 May 2016	Kuomintang	Wu Den-yih (Kuomintang)	13 (2012)
7		Tsai Ing-wen 蔡英文 (born 1956)	20 May 2016	20 May 2024	Democratic Progressive	Chen Chien-jen (Independent)	14 (2016)
7		Tsai Ing-wen 蔡英文 (born 1956)	20 May 2016	20 May 2024	Democratic Progressive	Lai Ching-te (DPP)	15 (2020)
8		Lai Ching-te 賴清德 (born 1959)	20 May 2024	Incumbent	Democratic Progressive	Hsiao Bi-khim (DPP)	16 (2024)

== List of presidents of the People's Republic of China (since 1949) ==
This is a list of all the chairmen of the People's Republic of China (1954–1975) and the presidents of the People's Republic of China (1982–present). The President of the PRC is called 主席 (zhǔxí), formerly translated as Chairman. The presidency was abolished between 1975 and 1982 with the functions of state representative being performed by the chairman of the Standing Committee of the National People's Congress.

Generations of leadership

First (Mao Zedong) Second (Deng Xiaoping) Third (Jiang Zemin) Fourth (Hu Jintao) Fifth (Xi Jinping)

=== Central People's Government (1949–1954) ===
Chairman of the Central People's Government

Portrait	Name (Lifespan)	Term of office		Vice Chairmen	Paramount leader
–	Mao Zedong 毛泽东 (1893–1976)	1 October 1949	27 September 1954	Zhu De; Liu Shaoqi; Soong Ching-ling; Li Jishen; Zhang Lan; Gao Gang	Himself
–	Mao Zedong 毛泽东 (1893–1976)	The first Chairman of the People's Republic of China. Mao also held more powerful offices as Chairman of the Chinese Communist Party and Chairman of the Central Military Commission, making him the Paramount leader of China.			

=== The 1st Constitution (1954–1975) ===
Chairman of the People's Republic of China

Portrait	Name (Birth–Death) Constituency		Term of office		NPC	Vice Chairman	Paramount leader
1	Mao Zedong 毛泽东 (1893–1976); Beijing At-large		27 September 1954	27 April 1959	I	Zhu De	Himself
2	Liu Shaoqi 刘少奇 (1898–1969); Beijing At-large		27 April 1959	21 December 1964	II	Soong Ching-ling & Dong Biwu (co-serving)	Mao Zedong
2	Liu Shaoqi 刘少奇 (1898–1969); Beijing At-large		21 December 1964	31 October 1968	III	Soong Ching-ling & Dong Biwu (co-serving)	Mao Zedong
2	Liu Shaoqi 刘少奇 (1898–1969); Beijing At-large		Ousted by Mao Zedong during the Cultural Revolution.				
–	Soong Ching-ling 宋庆龄 (1893–1981); Shanghai At-large	Dong Biwu 董必武 (1886–1975); Hubei At-large	31 October 1968	24 February 1972 (Soong) 17 January 1975 (Dong)	III	Vacancy by ascension	Mao Zedong
–	Soong Ching-ling 宋庆龄 (1893–1981); Shanghai At-large	Dong Biwu 董必武 (1886–1975); Hubei At-large	Soong was a member of the Revolutionary Committee of the Kuomintang. Both Soong Ching-ling and Dong Biwu co-served as Acting Chairpersons of the People's Republic of China until the resignation of Soong Ching-ling on 24 February 1972. Dong Biwu served the remainder of the term.				

=== The 2nd and 3rd Constitutions (1975–1982) ===
Chairman of the Standing Committee of the National People's Congress

Portrait	Name (Lifespan) Constituency	Term of office		NPC	Vice Chairmen	Paramount leader
–	Zhu De 朱德 (1886–1976); Sichuan At-large	17 January 1975	6 July 1976	IV	Soong Ching-ling; Dong Biwu (died 2 April 1975) and others	Mao Zedong
–	Soong Ching-ling 宋庆龄 (1893–1981); Shanghai At-large	6 July 1976	5 March 1978	IV		Mao Zedong; Hua Guofeng
–	Soong Ching-ling 宋庆龄 (1893–1981); Shanghai At-large	After Zhu De's death, Soong Ching-ling served as acting Chairwoman of the Standing Committee of the National People's Congress for the remainder of the 4th National People's Congress's term.				
–	Ye Jianying 叶剑英 (1897–1986); PLA	5 March 1978	18 June 1983	V	Soong Ching-ling and others	Hua Guofeng; Deng Xiaoping

Honorary Chairwoman of the People's Republic of China

Portrait	Name (Birth–Death) Constituency	Term of office		NPC	Notes
–	Soong Ching-ling 宋庆龄 (1893–1981); Shanghai At-large	16 May 1981	29 May 1981	V	Shortly before her death, Soong Ching-ling, a member of the Revolutionary Committee of the Kuomintang, was named Honorary Chairwoman of the People's Republic of China. She is the first and only Honorary President of the People's Republic of China.

=== The 4th Constitution (1983–present) ===
President of the People's Republic of China

Portrait	Name (Lifespan) Constituency	Term of office		NPC — (Election)	Vice President	Paramount leader
3	Li Xiannian 李先念 (1909–1992); Hubei At-large	18 June 1983	8 April 1988	VI — (62.5%)	Ulanhu	Deng Xiaoping
3	Li Xiannian 李先念 (1909–1992); Hubei At-large	During Li's term, China undertook major reforms in foreign policy, beginning to open up to the outside world. Li, who took on an important role in the ousting of the Gang of Four, became the first President of the People's Republic to visit the United States. He was also the first state president to visit North Korea. In 1984, Li met with U.S. President Ronald Reagan during Reagan's visit to China, notably discussing the status of Taiwan with the President. After leaving office as president, Li was then named Chairman of the National Committee of the CPPCC.				
4	Yang Shangkun 杨尚昆 (1907–1998); PLA	8 April 1988	27 March 1993	VII — (66.8%)	Wang Zhen	Deng Xiaoping; Jiang Zemin
4	Yang Shangkun 杨尚昆 (1907–1998); PLA	An elder from the party's revolutionary days, Yang was a political survivor of the Cultural Revolution. During his presidency, Yang promoted economic reform but opposed political liberalization. Yang reached the height of his political career after the 1989 Tiananmen Square protests and massacre, but his organized opposition to Jiang Zemin's leadership led Deng to force Yang to retire. Yang served as Vice Chairman of the Central Military Commission between 1983 and 1993.				
5	Jiang Zemin 江泽民 (1926–2022); Shanghai At-large	27 March 1993	15 March 1998	VIII — (68.4%)	Rong Yiren	Himself
5	Jiang Zemin 江泽民 (1926–2022); Shanghai At-large	15 March 1998	15 March 2003	IX — (71.5%)	Hu Jintao	Himself
5	Jiang Zemin 江泽民 (1926–2022); Shanghai At-large	Once the mayor and party secretary of Shanghai, Jiang's assumption of the presidency in 1993 marked a return to the centralization of major titles at the national level – Jiang also held the more powerful offices of General Secretary of the Chinese Communist Party and Chairman of the Central Military Commission since 1989. Under Jiang's leadership, China experienced substantial developmental growth with the reform and opening up, oversaw the handover of Hong Kong from the United Kingdom and Macau from Portugal, and improved its relations with the outside world while the Communist Party maintained its tight control over the government. Jiang was criticized for being too concerned about his personal image at home, and too conciliatory towards Russia and the United States abroad.				
6	Hu Jintao 胡锦涛 (born 1942); Tibet At-large (until 2008); Jiangsu At-large (from 2008)	15 March 2003	15 March 2008	X — (72.9%)	Zeng Qinghong	Himself
6	Hu Jintao 胡锦涛 (born 1942); Tibet At-large (until 2008); Jiangsu At-large (from 2008)	15 March 2008	14 March 2013	XI — (70.27%)	Xi Jinping	Himself
6	Hu Jintao 胡锦涛 (born 1942); Tibet At-large (until 2008); Jiangsu At-large (from 2008)	Hu, long having been anointed by Deng as Jiang's successor, took over the presidency in 2003, and also held the offices of General Secretary of the Communist Party and Chairman of the Central Military Commission. Hu presided over nearly a decade of consistent economic growth and a relatively smooth recovery from the 2008 financial crisis. China emerged as a major world power during Hu's term.				
7	Xi Jinping 习近平 (born 1953); Shanghai At-large (until 2018); Inner Mongolia At-large (2018–2023); Jiangsu At-large (from 2023)	14 March 2013	17 March 2018	XII — (72.21%)	Li Yuanchao	Himself
7	Xi Jinping 习近平 (born 1953); Shanghai At-large (until 2018); Inner Mongolia At-large (2018–2023); Jiangsu At-large (from 2023)	17 March 2018	10 March 2023	XIII — (71.10%)	Wang Qishan	Himself
7	Xi Jinping 习近平 (born 1953); Shanghai At-large (until 2018); Inner Mongolia At-large (2018–2023); Jiangsu At-large (from 2023)	10 March 2023	Incumbent	XIV — (70.60%)	Han Zheng	Himself
7	Xi Jinping 习近平 (born 1953); Shanghai At-large (until 2018); Inner Mongolia At-large (2018–2023); Jiangsu At-large (from 2023)	Xi became president in 2013, and also held the offices of General Secretary of the Communist Party and Chairman of the Central Military Commission since 2012. Xi increased the profile of the office of president in foreign affairs, for example receiving other heads of state during the 2015 China Victory Day Parade, going on high-profile visits to the United Kingdom and the United States, and making an important address at the Global Economic Forum in Davos, Switzerland. Under his leadership, Xi strengthened mass surveillance and launched Xinjiang re-education camps. Xi presided over anti-corruption campaign. In foreign policy, Xi advocated for "Wolf warrior diplomacy". Term limits for the president were removed in 2018.				

== See also ==
- List of premiers of China
