= Politics of China =

Politics of the People's Republic of China 中华人民共和国政治
- National emblem of China
- System: Communist state under the system of people's congress
- Constitution: Constitution of China
- Formation: 1 October 1949

Leading force of state and society
- Party: Chinese Communist Party
- General Secretary: Xi Jinping
- Supreme organ: National Congress
- Highest organ: Central Committee
- Political organ: Politburo
- Executive organ: Secretariat
- Military organ: Central Military Commission
- Supervisory organ: Central Commission for Discipline Inspection

Supreme state organ of power
- Full Convocation
- Name: National People's Congress
- Type: Unicameral
- Meeting place: Great Hall of the People, Beijing
- Permanent organ
- Permanent organ: Standing Committee
- Chair: Zhao Leji
- Secretary-General: Liu Qi

Supreme executive and administrative organ
- Name: State Council
- Head of Government
- Title: Premier
- Currently: Li Qiang
- Appointer: President
- Current term: 14th State Council
- Headquarters: Zhongnanhai
- Ministries: 26

Supreme military organ
- Name: Central Military Commission
- Chairman: Xi Jinping
- Vice Chairman: Zhang Youxia and Zhang Shengmin

Supervisory organ
- Name: National Supervisory Commission
- Director: Liu Jinguo
- Vice Director: Xiao Pei, Yu Hongqiu, Fu Kui, Sun Xinyang, Liu Xuexin and Zhang Fuhai

Supreme judicial organ
- Name: Supreme People's Court
- Chief judge: Zhang Jun (President)
- Seat: Beijing

Procuratorial organ
- Name: Supreme People's Procuratorate
- Head: Ying Yong (Prosecutor-General)
- Seat: Beijing

In the People's Republic of China, politics functions within the parameters of a unitary socialist state, in which the ruling Chinese Communist Party (CCP) enacts its policies through people's congresses. This one-party state operates on the principle of unified state power, in which the legislature, the National People's Congress (NPC), is constitutionally enshrined as the "highest state organ of power."

The Chinese political system is considered authoritarian. (Note: Attributed to multiple references:) There are no freely elected national leaders, political opposition is suppressed, all organized religious activity is controlled by the CCP, dissent is not permitted, and civil rights are curtailed. Limited direct elections have occurred only at the local level, not the national level, with all candidate nominations controlled by the CCP. The nature of the elections is highly constrained by the CCP's monopoly on power, censorship, and party control over elections. By law, all elections at all levels must adhere to the leadership of the CCP. All government bodies and state-owned enterprises have internal CCP committees that lead the decision-making in these institutions. China's two special administrative regions (SARs), Hong Kong and Macau, are governed under the "one country, two systems" principle.

The NPC meets annually for about two weeks in March to review and approve major new policy directions, and in between those sessions, delegates its powers to the working legislature, the NPC Standing Committee (NPCSC). This organ adopts most national legislation, interprets the constitution and laws, and conducts constitutional reviews, and is headed by the chairman, one of China's top officials. The president is a ceremonial office and has no real power but represents China abroad, though since the 1990s, the presidency has always been held by the leader of the Chinese Communist Party. Elected separately by the NPC, the vice president has no power other than what the president bestowed on them but assists the president. The head of the State Council, the NPC's executive organ, is the premier. The general secretary of the Chinese Communist Party is China's leading official since the CCP is tasked with formulating and setting national policy which the state, after being adopted by the NPC or relevant state organ, is responsible for implementing.

The State Council, also referred to as the Central People's Government, consists of, besides the Premier, a variable number of vice premiers, five state councilors (protocol equal of vice premiers but with narrower portfolios), the secretary-general, and 26 ministers and other cabinet-level department heads. It consists of ministries and agencies with specific portfolios. The State Council presents most initiatives to the NPCSC for consideration after previous endorsement by the CCP's Politburo Standing Committee.

China's judicial organs are political organs that perform prosecutorial and court functions. Because of the judiciary's political nature, China does not have judicial independence. China's courts are supervised by the Supreme People's Court (SPC), which answers to the NPC. The Supreme People's Procuratorate (SPP) is responsible for prosecutions and supervises procuracies at the provincial, prefecture, and county levels. At the same administrative ranking as the SPC and SPP, the National Supervisory Commission (NSC) was established in 2018 to investigate corruption within the CCP and state organs. All courts and their personnel are subject to the effective control of the CCP's Central Political and Legal Affairs Commission.

== Overview ==
Since the founding of the People's Republic of China (PRC) in 1949, the government in Beijing officially asserts to be the sole legitimate government of all of China, which it defines as including mainland China and Taiwan. This has been disputed by the Republic of China (ROC) government since the ROC government retreated to Taiwan in 1949. The ROC has since undergone significant political reforms following the end of martial law in 1987.

China's population, geographical vastness, and social diversity has historically frustrated attempts to rule from Beijing. Reform and opening up during the 1980s and the devolution of much central government decision making, combined with the strong interest of local CCP officials in enriching themselves, made it increasingly difficult for the central government to assert its authority. At the time, limited direct elections were held at the village and town levels, with all candidate nominations controlled by the CCP.

The PRC's state is unitary. All provincial and local bodies are obliged to comply with the regulations and policies established at the national level.

The Chinese political system is considered authoritarian. There are no freely elected national leaders, political opposition is suppressed, all organized religious activity is controlled by the CCP, dissent is not permitted, and civil rights are curtailed. The nature of the elections is highly constrained by the CCP's monopoly on power, censorship, and party control over elections. According to the 2023 V-Dem Democracy indices, China was the second least electoral democratic country in Asia. By law, all elections at all levels must adhere to the leadership of the CCP. The level of comprehensive control exercised by the CCP, combined with its revolutionary origins, has led it to be described as "one of the most durable regimes in modern history".

Some argue that during the general secretaryship of Xi Jinping, collective leadership in the country has waned. Others, such as academician Joseph Torigian, argue that Deng Xiaoping never really implemented collective leadership.

=== Self-description ===
The Chinese constitution describes the country's system of government as a "people's democratic dictatorship." The CCP has also used other terms to officially describe China's system of government including "socialist consultative democracy", and "whole-process people's democracy."

== Communist Party ==
The Chinese Communist Party (CCP) dominates the Chinese political landscape. Constitutionally, the party's supreme body is its National Congress, which meets every five years. Meetings were irregular before the Cultural Revolution but have been periodic since then. The National Congress elects the Central Committee and the Central Commission for Discipline Inspection (CCDI); the Central Committee in turn elects bodies such as:

- The General Secretary, which is the highest-ranking official within the Party and usually the Chinese paramount leader.
- The Politburo, consisting of 22 full members (including the members of the Politburo Standing Committee);
- The Politburo Standing Committee, the most powerful decision-making body in China, which as of June 2020 consists of seven members;
- The Secretariat, the principal administrative mechanism of the CCP, headed by the General Secretary;
- The Central Military Commission

=== Role and function ===
The CCP constitution states that the party is the highest force for political leadership. The party's institutions overlap with government institutions and the party has authority over government decisions at both the local and central levels. Senior government officials throughout the country are appointed by the CCP, and are mostly CCP members. All government departments, state-owned enterprises and public institutes include CCP committees, from the village level to the national level. The CCP committees in government bodies supervise and lead the bodies, with the State Council legally required to implement CCP policies. As outlined by the CCP constitution: "Government, the military, society and schools, north, south, east and west – the party leads them all."

According to scholar Rush Doshi, "[t]he Party sits above the state, runs parallel to the state, and is enmeshed in every level of the state." On the relationship between the government and the CCP, James Palmer, writing for Foreign Policy, states that, "[t]he Chinese government is essentially the shadow of the Communist Party, moving as the party does, and consequently government roles matter far less than party ones." According to The Economist, "[e]specially when meeting foreigners, officials may present name cards bearing government titles but stay quiet about party positions which may or may not outrank their state jobs." CCP control is tightest in central government offices and urban economic, industrial, and cultural settings; it is considerably looser over the government and party establishments in rural areas, where a significant percentage of mainland Chinese people live. The CCP's most important responsibility comes in the selection and promotion of personnel. They also see that party and state policy guidance is followed and that non-party members do not create autonomous organizations that could challenge party rule. Significant are the leading small groups which coordinate activities of different agencies. State-owned enterprises, private companies and foreign-owned businesses are also required to have internal CCP committees.

In relative liberalization periods, the influence of people and groups outside the formal party structure has increased, particularly in the economic realm. Nevertheless, in all governmental institutions in the PRC, the party committees at all levels maintain a powerful and pivotal role in the administration. During the leadership of Deng Xiaoping, there were proposals to increase the separation of the state and the party, termed dangzheng fenli (Chinese: 党政分離), advocated by more reformist officials such as Zhao Ziyang. The proposals included abolishing CCP committees from some government departments, increasing the influence of the State Council, and having professional managers leader SOEs instead of CCP committees. These proposals were abandoned after the 1989 Tiananmen Square protests and massacre.

Integration of the state and its institutions with the CCP as well as the CCP's strengthening vis-à-vis the state has accelerated during Xi Jinping's tenure, particularly following a series of institutional reforms initiated in 2018 and 2024 amendments to the Organic Law of the State Council. Under Xi, several state and party bodies have effectively merged under the "one institution with two names" system.

=== Intra-party factions ===
Chinese politics have long been defined by the competition between intra-party factions' ability to place key members and allies in positions of power within the CCP and Chinese government.

Under general secretaries Jiang Zemin and Hu Jintao, the two main factions were the Tuanpai and the Shanghai clique. The Tuanpai were cadres and officials that originated from the Communist Youth League of China, while the Shanghai Clique were officials that rose to prominence under Jiang Zemin when he was first mayor, and then CCP committee secretary, of Shanghai.

Xi Jinping, who became general secretary in 2012, has significantly centralized power, removing the influence of the old factions and promoting his allies, sometimes called the "Xi Jinping faction". Due to this, the old factions, including the Shanghai clique and the Tuanpai, are considered extinct, especially since the 20th CCP National Congress, in which Xi's allies dominated the new Politburo and the Politburo Standing Committee.

== Constitution ==
The first constitution of the PRC was created on 20 September 1954, before which the Common Program, an interim constitution-like document created by the Chinese People's Political Consultative Conference was in force. The second constitution in 1975 shortened the constitution to just about 30 articles, containing CCP slogans and revolutionary language throughout. The role of courts was slashed, and the Presidency was gone. The third constitution in 1978 expanded the number of articles, but was still under the influence of the very-recent Cultural Revolution.

The current constitution, declared on 4 December 1982, is the PRC's fourth but has subsequently been amended five times. The last amendment involved, among other things, abolishing term limits for the state president and vice president.

The legal power of the CCP is guaranteed by the PRC Constitution and its position as the supreme political authority in the People's Republic of China is put in practice through its comprehensive control of the state, military, and media.

== Leadership ==
=== Paramount leader ===
Power is concentrated in the "paramount leader," an informal title currently occupied by Xi Jinping, who heads the three most important political and state offices: He is the general secretary of the CCP Central Committee, Chairman of the Central Military Commission, and President of the PRC. Near the end of Hu Jintao's term in office, experts observed growing limitations to the paramount leader's de facto control over the government, but at the 19th Party Congress in October 2017, Xi Jinping's term limits were removed and his powers were expanded.

As a one-party state, the CCP general secretary holds ultimate power and authority over state and government with no term limit. (Note: Xi Jinping has been recognized as China's top leader since assuming the position of CCP general secretary in November 2012.) The CCP retains effective control over governmental appointments. The offices of CCP general secretary and chairman of the Central Military Commission have often been held by one individual since 1989, granting the individual predominant power over the country. Since 1982, the CCP general secretary has also been the political chief position of China (above the president and premier).

=== Party and state leaders ===
The CCP Politburo Standing Committee consists of the government's top leadership. Historically it has had five to nine members. As of 2024, it has seven members. Its officially mandated purpose is to conduct policy discussions and make decisions on major issues when the Politburo, a larger decision-making body, is not in session. According to the CCP's constitution, the general secretary of the Central Committee must also be a member of the CCP Politburo Standing Committee.

The membership of the PSC is strictly ranked in protocol sequence. Historically, the general secretary (or party chairman) has been ranked first; the rankings of other leaders have varied over time. Since the 1990s, the general secretary (also the president), premier, chairman of the NPC Standing Committee, the chairman of the Chinese People's Political Consultative Conference, the secretary of the Central Commission for Discipline Inspection, the party's top anti-graft body, and the first-ranked secretary of the CCP secretariat have consistently also been members of the Politburo Standing Committee.

Ranked below the party's Politburo Standing Committee are deputy state leaders including the party's chief staff, vice premiers, and the party secretaries of China's most important municipalities and provinces.Ministers and provincial governors are next in rank, followed by deputy ministers and deputy provincial governors. Ministry director generals and sub provincial municipality mayors rank below this, followed by ministry deputy director generals and third-tier city mayors. There are five ranks below these which reach to the base of the government and party hierarchies.

== State institutions ==
=== National People's Congress ===
The National People's Congress (NPC) is the supreme state organ of power of China. With 2,977 members in 2023, it is the largest parliamentary body in the world. Under China's current Constitution, the NPC is structured as a unicameral legislature, with the power to legislate, to oversee the operations of the government, and to elect the major officials of state. Its delegates are indirectly elected for a five-year term through a multi-tiered system. According to the constitution, the NPC is the highest state institution within China's political system.

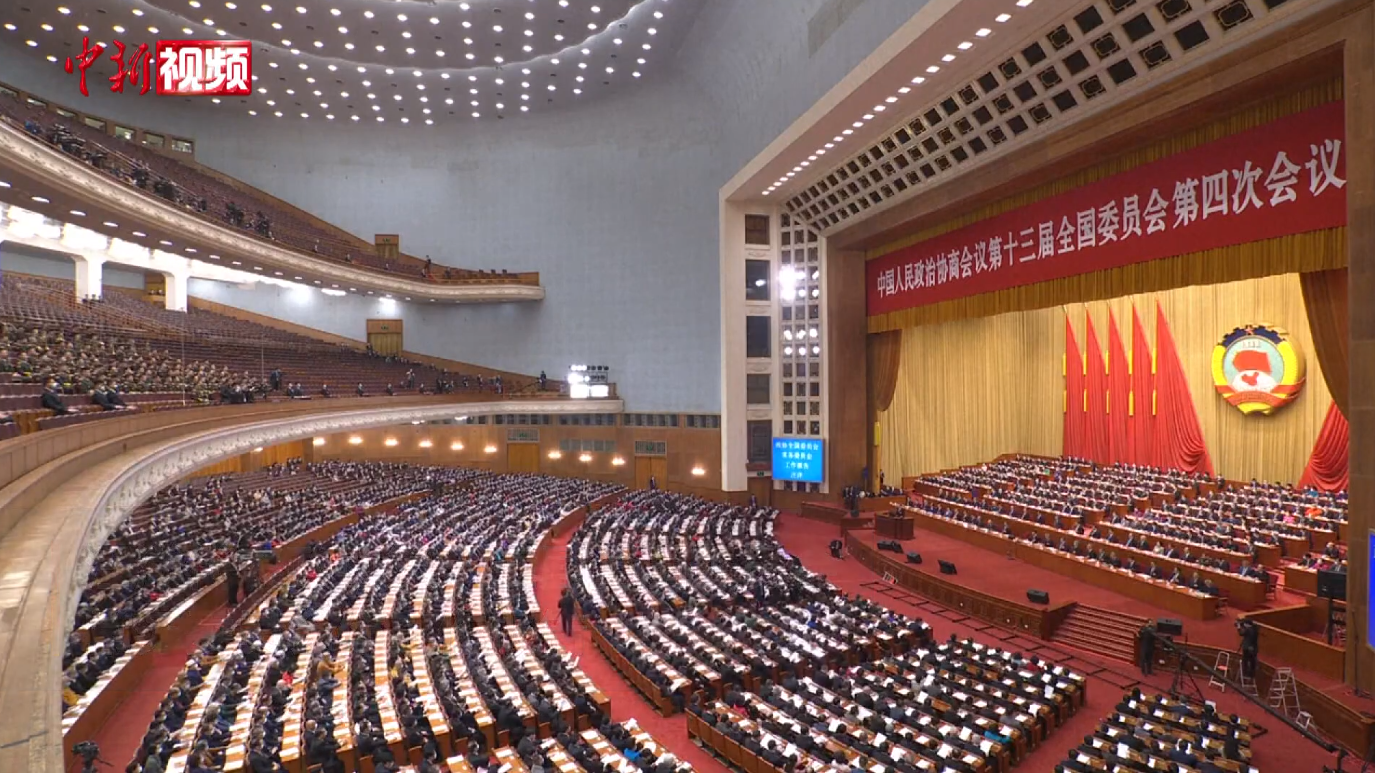
Political Consultative Conference

The NPC holds annual sessions every spring, usually lasting from 10 to 14 days, in the Great Hall of the People on the west side of Tiananmen Square, Beijing. These annual meetings are usually timed to occur with the meetings of the National Committee of the Chinese People's Political Consultative Conference (CPPCC), a consultative body whose members represent various people's organizations, are the main deliberative bodies of China, and are often referred to as the Two Sessions. The meetings provide an opportunity for the officers of state to review past policies and present future plans to the nation.

The meetings cover reviewing and approving major new policy directions, laws, the budget, and major personnel changes. The NPC elects and appoints important state positions such as the president, the vice president, the chairman and other members of the Central Military Commission, the premier and rest of the State Council, the president of the Supreme People's Court, and procurator general of the Supreme People's Procuratorate. The NPC also elects a Standing Committee (NPCSC), its permanent body which meets regularly between NPC sessions. Most national legislation in China is adopted by the NPCSC. Most initiatives are presented to the NPCSC for consideration by the State Council after previous endorsement by the CCP Politburo Standing Committee.

Aside from the CCP, eight minor political parties, officially termed "democratic parties," also participate in the NPC, but are non-oppositional and have no real power. They must accept the primacy of the CCP to exist and their members are preapproved by the CCP's United Front Work Department. Their original function was to create the impression that the PRC was being ruled by a diverse national front, not a one-party dictatorship. The major role of these parties is to attract and subsequently muzzle niches in society that have political tendencies, such as academia.

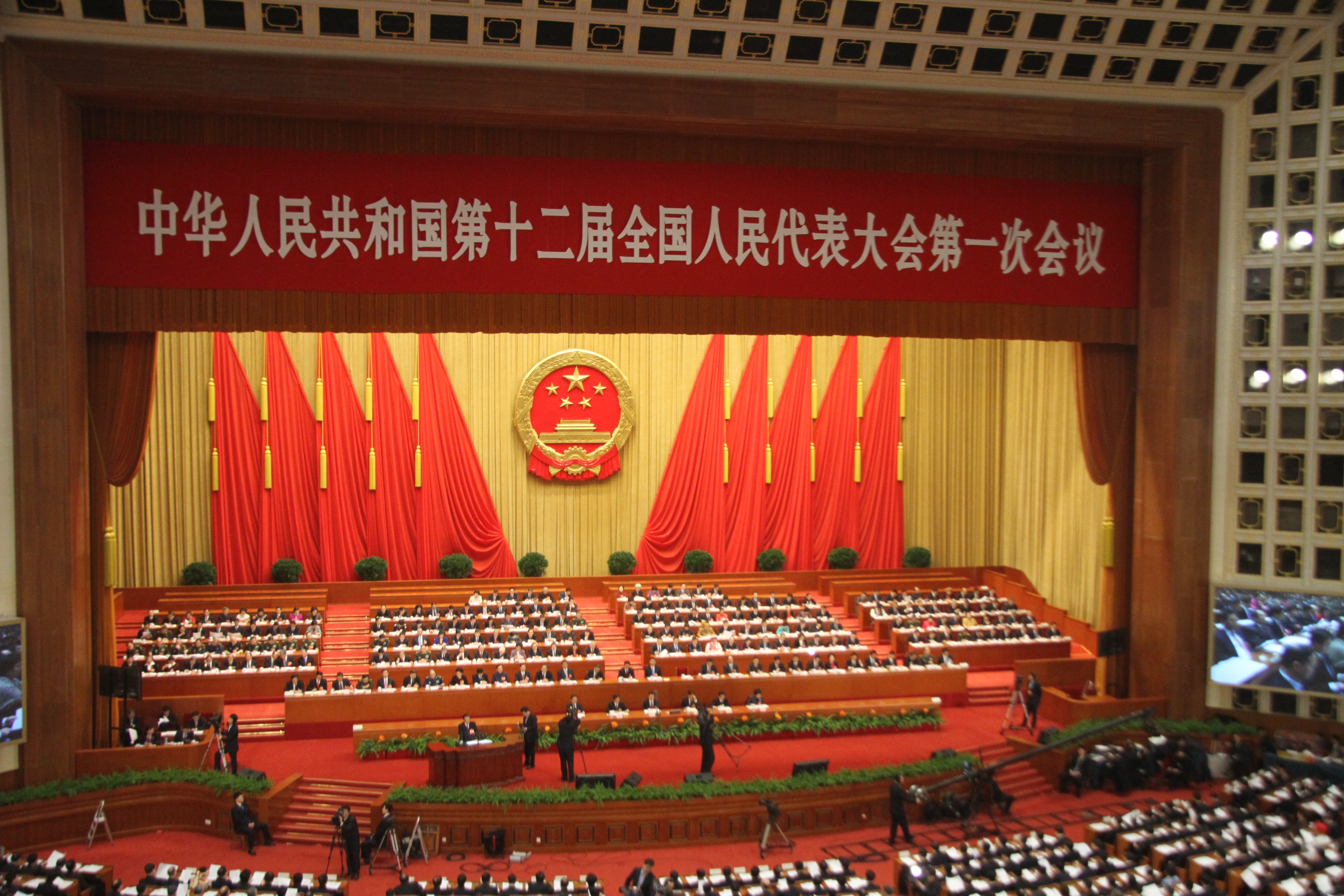
The 12th National People's Congress held in 2013

The NPC generally has a reputation of approving the work of the State Council and not engaging in overmuch drafting of laws itself. However, it and its Standing Committee have occasionally asserted themselves. For example, the State Council and the CCP were unable to secure passage of a fuel tax in 2009 to finance the construction of expressways. Likewise, the Ministry of Finance has sought to institute property taxes since the early 2010s, but opposition from the NPC (as well as local governments) have prevented any property tax proposals from reaching the NPC's legislative agenda. The NPC Standing Committee is more assertive than the NPC itself and has vetoed proposed laws.

=== President ===
The president of China is the state representative, serving as the ceremonial figurehead under the National People's Congress. Under the Chinese constitution, the President of China is a largely ceremonial office with limited powers. However, since 1993, as a matter of convention, the presidency has been held simultaneously by the General Secretary of the Chinese Communist Party, the top leader in the one-party system. The office is officially regarded as an institution of the state rather than an administrative post; theoretically, the president serves at the pleasure of the National People's Congress, the legislature, and is not legally vested to take executive action on its own prerogative. (Note: It is listed as such in the current Constitution; it is thus equivalent to organs such as the State Council, rather than to offices such as that of the premier.) The current president is Xi Jinping, who took office in March 2013.

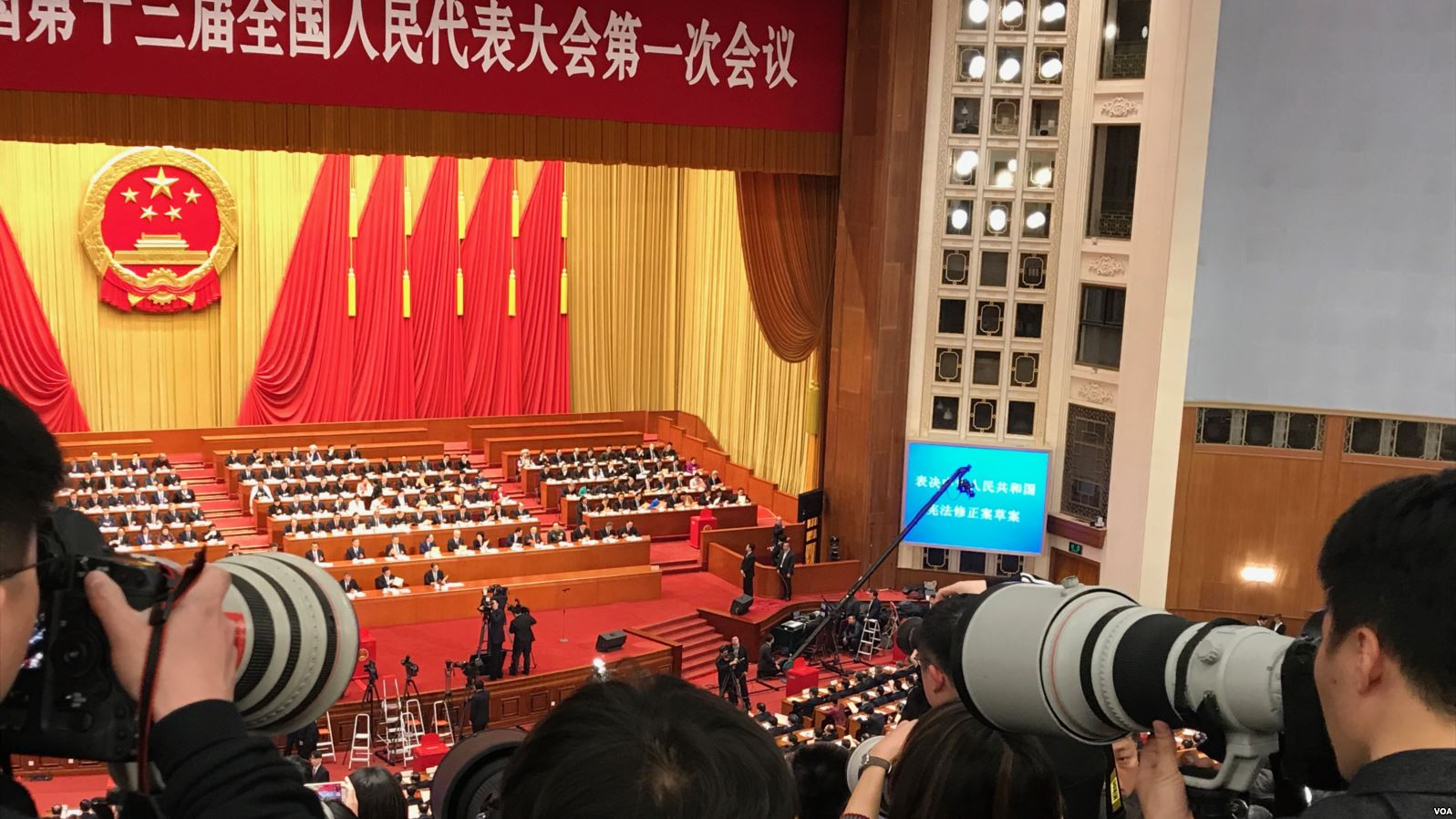
The first session of the 13th National People's Congress voting on the constitutional amendment on 11 March 2018

The office was first established in the Constitution of the People's Republic of China in 1954 and successively held by Mao Zedong and Liu Shaoqi. Liu fell into political disgrace during the Cultural Revolution, after which the office became vacant. The office was abolished under the Constitution of 1975, then reinstated in the Constitution of 1982, but with reduced powers. The official English-language translation of the title was "Chairman"; after 1982, this translation was changed to "President", although the Chinese title remains unchanged. (Note: In Chinese, the President of the PRC is termed Zhǔxí (主席) while the Presidents of other countries are termed Zǒngtǒng (总统). Furthermore zhǔxí continues to have the meaning of "chairman" in a generic context.) In March 2018, presidential term limits were abolished.

=== State Council ===
The State Council is the supreme administrative organ of China's unified state apparatus and the executive organ of the National People's Congress. Members of the State Council include the premier, a variable number of vice premiers (now four), state councilors (protocol equal of vice premiers but with narrower portfolios), and ministers and heads of State Council commissions.

== Local-level politics ==
Each local Bureau or office is under the coequal authority of the local leader and the leader of the corresponding office, bureau or ministry at the next higher level. People's Congress members at the county level are elected by voters. These county-level People's Congresses have the responsibility of oversight of local government and elect members to the Provincial (or Municipal in the case of independent municipalities) People's Congress. The Provincial People's Congress, in turn, elects members to the National People's Congress that meets each year in March in Beijing. The ruling CCP committee at each level plays a large role in the selection of appropriate candidates for election to the local congress and to the higher levels.

While operating under strict control and supervision by the central government, China's local governments manage relatively high share of fiscal revenues and expenditures. Their level of authority and autonomy in economic decision-making is high, and they have played a major role in national economic development. They do not have the right to make tax laws but may have the ability to adjust certain tax rates within boundaries established by the central government.

Through the late 1980s and the early 1990s, the municipal government regulatory mechanisms expanded, as did their capacity to regulate peri-urban areas. The 1994 fiscal reforms resulted in the need of local governments to generate non-tax revenue, which they did in the form of revenues through land development and use fees. This resulted in their increase in both administrative size and geographic size. From 2002 to at least 2023, the cost of providing public goods has devolved to local governments from the central government and therefore local governments need to generate fees to provide public services. Local governments are the key provider of public goods in China.

Since 2014, the National New-Type Urbanization Plan has resulted in the consolidation of planning processes that were formerly distributed across different bureaucracies, such as urban and rural land use, tourism planning, and environmental planning.

Beginning in 2015, the central government allowed local governments to issue bonds to finance public capital spending for projects like infrastructure and hospitals. The quantity of such bonds is set by the central government. Local governments cannot issue bonds to pay for current spending, such as salaries.

== Armed forces ==
The CCP created and leads the People's Liberation Army. After the PRC was established in 1949, the PLA also became a state military. The state's military system upholds the principle of the CCP's absolute leadership over the armed forces, often referred to under Mao's maxim that "the Party commands the gun." The CCP and the state jointly established the Central Military Commission (CMC) that carries out the task of supreme military leadership over the armed forces. The CMC chairman is concurrently held by the general secretary of the Chinese Communist Party in line with the CCP's absolute control over the military.

== Legal system ==
The People's Republic of China has a socialist legal system based upon civil law, formally called "socialist rule of law with Chinese characteristics." The country does not have judicial independence or judicial review as its judiciary does not have authority beyond what is granted to it by the National People's Congress. The CCP's Central Political and Legal Affairs Commission maintains effective control over the courts and their personnel.

=== Supreme People's Court and Supreme People's Procuratorate ===
The Supreme People's Court is the judicial organ of the People's Republic of China and is subject to the control of the CCP's Central Political and Legal Affairs Commission. Hong Kong and Macau, as special administrative regions, have separate judicial systems based on British common law traditions and Portuguese civil-law traditions, respectively. The judges of the Supreme People's Court are appointed by the National People's Congress.

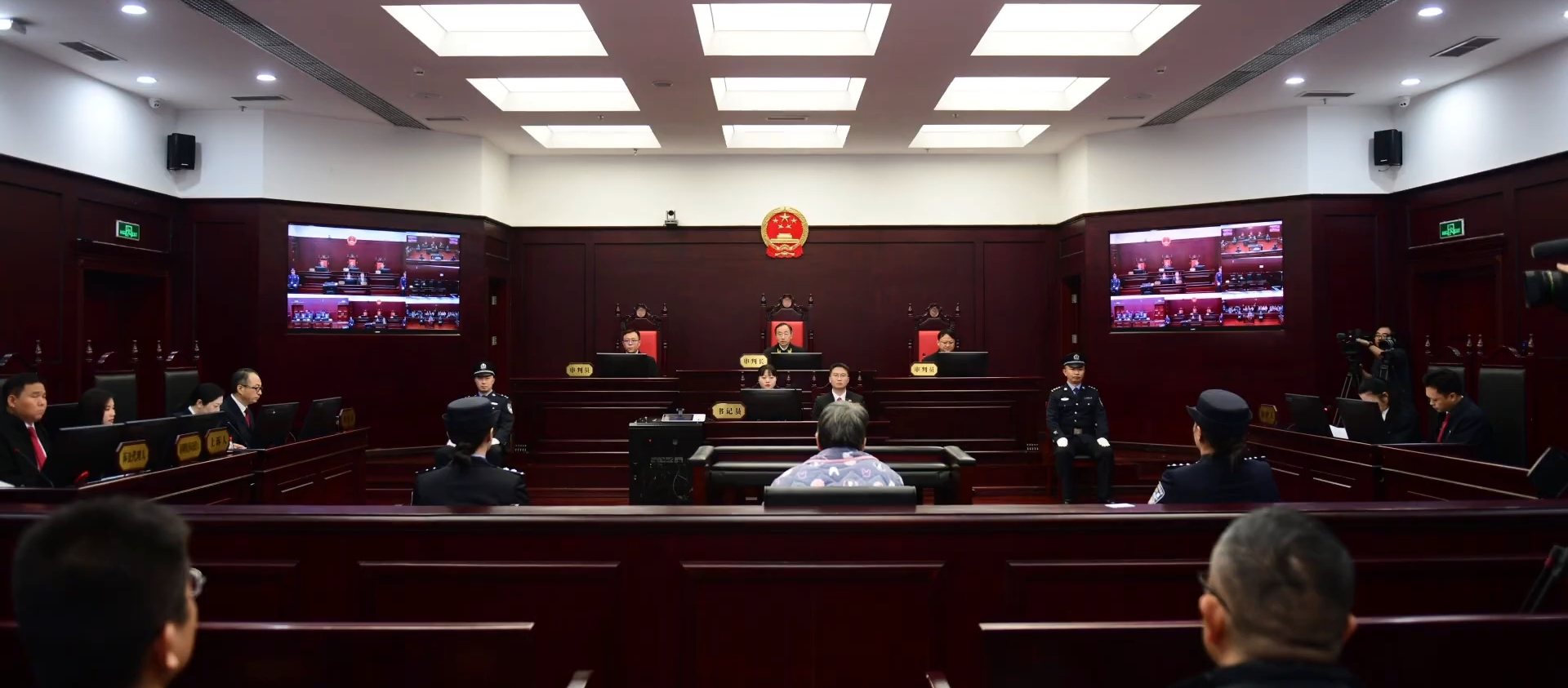
A trial by the Guizhou High People's Court

=== Nationality law ===
Nationality is granted at birth to children with at least one Chinese-national parent, with some exceptions. In general, naturalization or the obtainment of the People's Republic of China nationality is difficult. The Nationality Law prescribes only three conditions for the obtainment of PRC nationality (marriage to a PRC national is one, permanent residence is another). PRC nationals who acquire a foreign nationality automatically lose Chinese nationality. State functionaries and military personnel on active service are not permitted to renounce their Chinese nationality. If a citizen wishes to resume PRC nationality, foreign nationality is no longer recognized.

=== Ethnic minorities ===
The Law on Promoting Ethnic Unity and Progress is the People's Republic of China's (PRC) guiding legislation concerning ethnic minorities. The law was introduced by the National People's Congress (NPC)'s Ethnic Affairs Committee and submitted to the NPC on 8 September 2025. It was signed into law on 12 March 2026 and enacted on 1 July 2026. The law codifies CCP general secretary Xi Jinping's policies regarding the sinicization of ethnic minorities. The law has been widely criticized by scholars, the United Nations High Commissioner for Human Rights, multiple governments, former United Nations special rapporteurs, and human rights activists outside of China. The law's promotion of extraterritorial enforcement has been likened to transnational repression.

==== Policies toward Uyghurs ====
In 2020, widespread public reporting detailed the Chinese government's pattern of human rights violations in its continuing maltreatment of Uyghurs. These abuses include forced labor, arbitrary detainment, forced political indoctrination, destruction of cultural heritage, and forced abortions and sterilization. Critics of the policy have described it as the Sinicization of Xinjiang and called it an ethnocide or cultural genocide, with many activists, NGOs, human rights experts, government officials, and the U.S. government calling it a genocide. The Chinese government denies it is committing human rights violations in Xinjiang.

=== Legalist influence ===
Some scholars have drawn comparisons between the current governance of the CCP and certain aspects of the ancient Chinese philosophy of Legalism. As articulated by The Book of Lord Shang, Legalism emphasizes centralized authority, strict laws, harsh punishments, and a merit-based bureaucratic system.

== Foreign relations ==
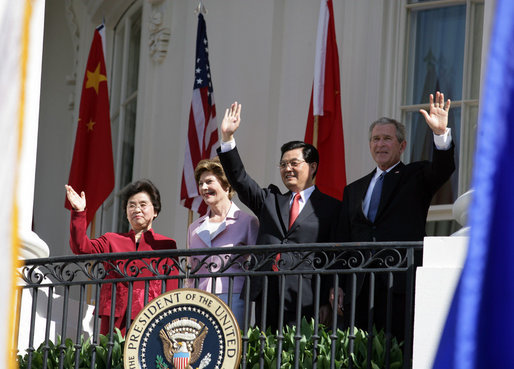
Chinese leader Hu Jintao and US president George W. Bush, with first ladies Liu Yongqing and Laura Bush, wave from the White House. The relationship between the world's sole superpower United States and the emerging superpower status of the PRC is closely watched by international observers.

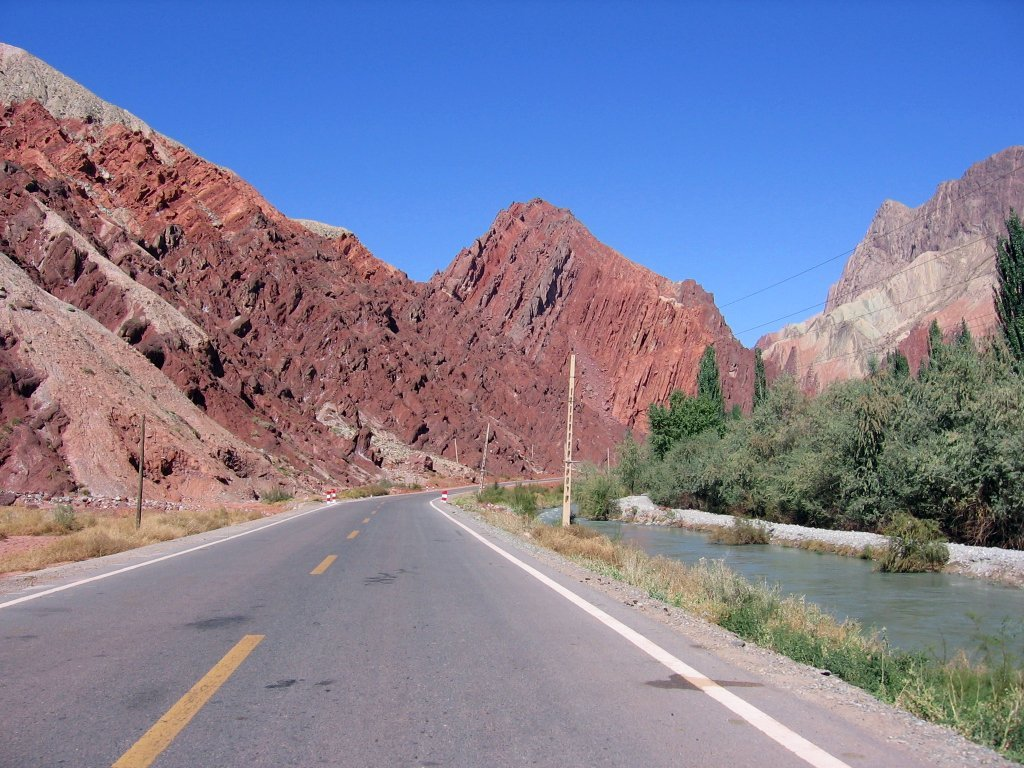
The Karakoram Highway connecting China and Pakistan is an example of China's international development involvements.

The PRC maintains diplomatic relations with most countries in the world. In 1971, the PRC replaced the Republic of China, commonly known as "Taiwan" since the 1970s, as the sole representative of China in the United Nations and as one of the five permanent members of the United Nations Security Council. China had been represented by the Republic of China at the time of the UN's founding in 1945. (See also China and the United Nations.)

Under the One-China policy, the PRC has made it a precondition to establishing diplomatic relations that the other country acknowledges its claim to all of China, including Taiwan, and severs any official ties with the Republic of China (ROC) government. The government actively opposes foreign government meetings with the 14th Dalai Lama in a political capacity, as the spokesperson for a separatist movement in Tibet.

The PRC has been playing a leading role in calling for free trade areas and security pacts amongst its Asia-Pacific neighbors. In 2004, the PRC proposed an entirely new East Asia Summit (EAS) framework as a forum for regional security issues that pointedly excluded the United States. The EAS, which includes ASEAN Plus Three, India, Australia and New Zealand, held its inaugural summit in 2005. China is also a founding member of the Shanghai Cooperation Organisation (SCO), alongside Russia, Kazakhstan, Kyrgyzstan, Tajikistan, and Uzbekistan.

=== Foreign aid ===
After the establishment of the People's Republic of China under the CCP in 1949, China joined the international community in providing foreign aid. In the past few decades, the international community has seen an increase in Chinese foreign aid. Specifically, a recent example is the Belt and Road Initiative (BRI), a global infrastructure project that was launched in 2013 by Chinese leader Xi Jinping. The stated goal of the program is to expand maritime routes and land infrastructure networks connecting China with Asia, Africa, and Europe, boosting trade and economic growth. It involves a massive development of trade routes that will create a large expansion of land transportation infrastructure and new ports in the Pacific and Indian oceans to facilitate regional and intercontinental trade flow and increase oil and gas supply.

=== International territorial disputes ===
The PRC is in a number of international territorial disputes, several of which involved the Sino-Russian border. Although the great majority of them are now resolved, China's territorial disputes have led to several localized wars in the last 50 years, including the Sino-Indian War in 1962, the Sino-Soviet border conflict in 1969 and the Sino-Vietnam War in 1979. In 2001, China and Russia signed the Treaty of Good-Neighborliness and Friendly Cooperation, which ended the conflict. Other territorial disputes include islands in the East and South China Seas, and undefined or disputed borders with India, Bhutan and North Korea.

=== International organizations ===
On 26 October 1971, the UN General Assembly adopted Resolution 2758 to transfer the seat from the Republic of China (ROC) on Taiwan to the People's Republic of China (PRC). Today, not only is China a part of many UN organizations, it is also one of the five permanent members of the UN Security Council. A memo done by the U.S.-China Economic and Security Review Commission identified Chinese nationals serving in leadership position within international organizations signifies China's increasing involvement in the international arena. For instance, the International Telecommunication Union (ITU), International Civil Aviation Organization (ICAO), United Nations Industrial Development Organization (UNIDO), Food and Agriculture Organization (FAO), and so on are all organizations that Chinese nationals are currently in position of (The memo is updated on a semi-annual basis).

== Policy development ==
The CCP's Central Policy Research Office drafts high-level policy proposals. Leading small groups help coordinate guiding principles for policy development. Implementing agencies plan to put policies into action.

CCP policy documents are often framed as "proposals", "opinions", or "guiding opinions" and such documents tend to be relatively short and establish underlying principles. The general trend is that state policy documents issued thereafter tend to express more concrete details.

New policies are often tested locally before being applied more widely, resulting in a policy process that involves experimentation and feedback. This method of first implementing policy through local pilot testing was also used during the Mao era. Generally, high level central government leadership refrains from drafting specific policies, instead using the informal networks and site visits to affirm or suggest changes to the direction of local policy experiments or pilot programs. The typical approach is that central government leadership begins drafting formal policies, law, or regulations after policy has been developed at local levels.

After the period of reform and opening up, China has been characterized by a high degree of political centralization but significant economic decentralization. The central government sets the strategic direction while local officials carry it out, including developing the details of policy. Since the tenure of Xi Jinping, the practice by which the CCP sets policy priorities at a high level is known as "top-level design".

=== Budget ===
China's fiscal budget has four parts: general fiscal budget, budget for government funds, budget for operating income of state-owned capital, and social insurance budget.

The largest part is the general fiscal budget, which is a unitary budget that is allocated between central fiscal and local fiscal budgets. The central government sets targets for its fiscal revenue and expenditures, as well as local government fiscal revenue and expenditures.

=== State capacity ===
China has a high degree of state capacity. Academic Thomas Heberer attributes China's state capacity to: (1) the legitimacy of its political system as viewed by its citizens, (2) the ability to exercise social control and regulation, (3) coercive resources, (4) the capacity to consult and collaborate with emerging social groups and organizations to balance conflicting interests, and (5) the ability to learn from failures and mistakes.

=== Commentary ===
Academics Sebastian Heilmann and Elizabeth Perry write that policy-making in China is influenced by the Chinese Communist Revolution, resulting in a policy approach that combined centralized leadership with intense mass mobilization, and that this mode of governance is defined by continuous experimentation and improvisation. Heilmann writes that the state's "unusual adaptive capacity" in economic matters is attributable to an "institutional structure that ... enables it to try out alternative approaches to overcome long-standing impediments to economic development, tackle newly emerging challenges, and grasp opportunities when they open up." According to academics Jérôme Doyon and Chloé Froissart, the adaptive capacity resulting from a heritage of guerrilla warfare has made the CCP adept in dealing with uncertainty and has translated into a capacity to experiment first and then systemize the results.

Academic Chen Li writes that institutional adaptation in China's state sector extends to the late 1950s, and that since the 1990s, "continuous learning, experimentation, and adaptation of CPC central bureaucracy ... has not only brought about the rise of China's 'national champions' in finance, but also sustained critical support for the entire 'national team'."

== Civil service ==
China's civil service is divided into tiers. The highest tiers (including department chiefs, deputy department chiefs, and section chiefs) have significant involvement in policy-making. According to the 2020 Law on Governmental Sanctions for Public Employees, any public employee, including civil servants, that publish "articles, speeches, declarations, and statements opposing the State’s guiding ideologies established in the Constitution, the leadership of the Communist Party, the socialist system, or the reform and opening up" are to be automatically dismissed from office.

== Ideological groupings ==
Various ideological groupings exist in China, often with hybrid and varying beliefs on political, economic, and cultural matters. The "Old Left" support pre-1978 Maoist socialism. The New Left represents a broad range of political currents which are critical of economic liberalization, neoliberalism, market economics; it ranges from Maoists to those who advocate something more like the European welfare model. Initially, the term was propagated by liberal opponents who contended that there was no fundamental difference between hardline Maoists and the New Left.

Liberalism in China covers a significant range of ideologies. Among others, varieties of liberal thought in the PRC include the liberal Marxists of the 1980s (who opposed ultra-leftism and supported a reformist socialism) and the neoliberals of the 1990s (who sought market reform and contended that this would necessarily increase political rights). Academic Hang Tu summarizes, "[A] common thread that runs through these heterogenous intellectual dynamics is the call for the condemnation of Mao's revolutionary legacy in particular and the abandonment of radical approaches to Chinese history and politics in general."

The term conservatism has been used to characterize multiple intellectual trends, including Confucian revivalists, cultural nationalists, and proponents of realpolitick. A common theme among the diverse trends of conservatism in China is the continuity of the Chinese civilizational tradition and opposition to Western secular modernity.

Summarizing research in the Chinese political context, academic Chenyang Song writes that the left-wing/right-wing dichotomy is not an essential criterion for differentiating Chinese ideological stances, nor is it a pro-CCP or anti-CCP attitude.

== Civil society ==
Academic debates on whether China has a civil society are ongoing.

Within China, academic debate regarding theories of the public sphere began in the 1980s. There is no consensus and academic debates involve disagreements in the applicability of concepts like "civil society," "private sphere," and "state" in the Chinese context. Among the issues is that the terminology developed by Jürgen Habermas was developed in discourse on German bourgeois society. The major groups in Habermasian theory include merchants, bankers, manufacturers, and entrepreneurs, which is not consistent with Chinese views of the "general public."

The majority of research on Chinese civil society from the early 1990s to the early 2010s has been to examine "the organizational independence of civic associations from the state". Researchers have argued that the western driven definition of "civil society" is too narrowly fixed, which does not allow for a full understanding of Chinese civil society. Taru Salmenkari, an associate professor specializing in contemporary China and issues of democracy and civil society in East Asia at Tallinn University, has argued in her "Theoretical Poverty in the Research on Chinese Civil Society" that to understand Chinese civil society, one must "...go beyond the question of the degree of autonomy from the state. It must address the nature of horizontal contacts through which civil society is constituted".

=== Advocacy ===
A 2013 study by Harvard University found that while the censorship exists, the purpose of the censorship is not to silence all comments made about the state or any particular issues, but rather to prevent and reduce the probability of collective action. As the study illustrates, allowing social media to flourish also has allowed negative and positive comments about the state and its leaders to exist. According to another study, the development of technology and the internet has also allowed certain civil society advocacy, such as the Weiquan movement, to flourish.

=== Protests ===
Protesters and dissidents in the People's Republic of China (PRC) espouse a wide variety of grievances, most commonly in the areas of unpaid wages, compensation for land development, local environmental activism, or NIMBY activism. Tens of thousands of protests occur each year in what the authorities term "mass incidents." Nationwide protests are less common. Notable protests have included the 1959 Tibetan uprising, the 1989 Tiananmen Square protests and massacre, the April 1999 demonstration by Falun Gong practitioners at Zhongnanhai, the 2008 Tibetan unrest, the July 2009 Ürümqi riots, the 2011 pro-democracy protests, and the 2022 COVID-19 protests.

=== Citizen surveys ===
Surveys have shown a high level of the Chinese public's satisfaction with their government. These views are generally attributed to the material comforts and security available to large segments of the Chinese populace as well as the government's attentiveness and responsiveness. Academic Klára Dubravčíková writes that a majority of the Chinese middle class are satisfied with the CCP and are among those who tend to credit it for the increase of living standards in China since reform and opening up.

A 2009 study by academic Tony Sachs found that 95.9% of Chinese citizens were relatively satisfied or extremely satisfied with the central government, with the figure dropping to 61.5% for their local governments. A study published in The China Quarterly on attitudes from 2003 to 2016 found that people in coastal regions were particularly satisfied with government performance.

Survey data compiled by academic Bruce Dickson and published in 2016 concludes that approximately 70% of China's population supports the Chinese Dream.

Using survey experiments from 2018, a 2023 study found that 37 percent supported "removing the term limit for the national leader" in indirect surveys, compared to 59.6% in direct surveys, though it did add that "as the 95% confidence interval crosses 50%, we cannot conclude that only a minority supported the term limit removal". It also found that 76.7% trust the central government while 67% trust the local government. It concludes that "The lack of evidence for majority support for the term limit removal indicates the Chinese public is not unquestioning or naïve; they are capable of expressing reservations about government, at least indirectly. This finding further suggests the relatively high level of trust in the national government is largely genuine".

According to the World Values Survey covering 2017 to 2020, 95% of Chinese respondents have significant confidence in their government. Confidence decreased to 91% in the survey's 2022 edition.

A 2020 survey by Harvard University found that citizen satisfaction with the government had increased since 2003, also rating China's government as more effective and capable than ever before in the survey's history. The survey also showed that trust in government had increased since 2003, particularly following the anti-corruption campaign of Xi Jinping. Satisfaction with interactions with local officials had also increased from 47.9% in 2011 to 75.1% by 2016. Publishing in 2024, academics Alfred Wu et al. conclude that survey data show that Chinese people in all segments of society tend to trust the government.

A 2020 study by University of Southern California researchers affiliated with the Hoover Institution found that more anonymous surveys show 50 to 70 percent think the government works for the people, lower than what direct surveys show support at above 90 percent. The same survey found that Han Chinese are more positive towards the government than are ethnic minorities, who tend to conceal their views of the government. It also found that college education, CCP membership and urban residency were correlated with higher support for the government. The survey found that support for Xi Jinping was between 65% and 70%.

According to a survey by Pew Research Center in 2020, Chinese citizens are among the most optimistic in the world.

Survey results from researchers at Stanford University from 2014 to 2020 show no clear alignment along the left-right spectrum or pro-government or anti-government positions. Wealthier and more educated Chinese tend to prefer market liberalization, political democratization, and are less nationalistic, while poorer and less educated citizens show the opposite trend. The survey's authors believe may be a reflection of how the former group has benefited more from China's market reforms.

Summarizing survey data developed from 2003 to 2020, academic Lan Xiaohuan writes that overall satisfaction is approximately 83% for the central government, 78% for provincial governments, and 70% for county and township governments. Lan also concludes that the anti-corruption campaign of Xi Jinping was successful in raising public confidence in the ethics of government officials.

According to a 2021 analysis by Princeton University academic Rory Truex of survey results, Chinese people who are discontented with the CCP typically have socially marginalized personalities and are more introverted, fearful and anxious while displaying lower levels of dependence, sentimentality, self-esteem, cheerfulness and enthusiasm about life, while CCP members and supporters exhibit more traits associated with personal and professional success such as confidence, organization and work ethic, interpersonal skill, and creativity and dynamism. Results from the study showed that those discontented with the CCP typically showed high neuroticism and low conscientiousness, agreeableness and openness to experience, while CCP members on average had very high levels of extraversion, agreeableness, and conscientiousness. The survey results suggest that this contributes to the CCP's continuing dominance by relegating people discontented with CCP to the margins of society.

Publishing in 2025, academic Bingqin Li writes that survey data shows that improved social services may strengthen public trust in the government. Li cites survey data showing that political trust and policy expectation of both the central and local governments were higher in New Rural Pension Scheme pilot areas than in non-pilot areas, and data showing that improving infrastructure led to improvements of political trust. Li summarizes, "Further research also found that political trust in local governments has been strongly influenced by the perception that these governments perform well, are responsive to citizens' needs, and are free from corruption."

=== Non-governmental organizations (NGOs) ===
Although NGO development in China is relatively slow compared to other countries, a Harvard University academic study reveals that China had NGOs as early as during the Dynasties. Specifically in the forms of American missionaries, which assisted in rural reconstruction programs and ideological reforms locally. After the establishment of The People's Republic of China (PRC) in 1949, Mao banned any NGOs that were related to counter revolutionary goals. During the reform era under Deng beginning the 1970s, NGOs although not completely banned, three laws were implemented to keep relatively tight control over them––the Regulations on the Registration and Management of Social Organizations, the Regulations on the Registration and Management of Foundations, and the Interim Provisions for the Administration of Foreign Chambers of Commerce in China. The latter two were implemented after the 1989 Tiananmen Square protests and massacre, and the general tone of all the regulations emphasized government control. For instance, the regulations require a two-tiered management system, in which before being legally registered by the Ministry of Civil Affairs, a government agency must sponsor the organization; thus, two governmental agencies must be monitoring the day-to-day operations of the NGO. However, in the 1990s, NGOs began to regain momentum despite restrictions in place. Today, the number of registered organizations in China has grown to over 700,000, "... including many professional and friendship associations, foundations working in the fields of education, science, and culture, and a large number of nonprofits engaged in poverty alleviation, social work with people with disabilities, children, and the elderly. The number of nonprofits and environmental education and climate action groups has also significantly grown".

In 2017, a policy called "Management of Overseas NGOs' Activities in Mainland China Law" (FNGO Law) was enacted, which creates registration barriers that, for instance, require a Chinese partner organization to sign on. The reaction from the West has widely been that the space for NGOs to conduct work in may be shrinking.

Many NGOs in the PRC have been described as government-organized non-governmental organization (GONGOs) that are organized under the CCP's united front system.

The All-China Federation of Industry and Commerce (ACFIC) is a people's organization and chamber of commerce established in 1953. The ACFIC was established to advance the CCP's interests and promote the party's policies among private entrepreneurs. It seeks to influence policy through submitting proposals to the CPPCC, a process which requires relevant government ministries to investigate the proposals and prepare a formal response.

The All-China Federation of Trade Unions (ACFTU)'s stated goal is to advocate for workers' interests within the CCP and the government. It also seeks to address occupational health and safety issues and carries on industrial policy oversight. It is the country's sole legal workers union. The CCP controls the appointment of ACFTU officials at the regional and national levels.

== See also ==
- Politics of Hong Kong
- Politics of Macau
