= List of state representatives of the People's Republic of China =

The position of state representative is the most senior state office of the People's Republic of China, with a role similar to a ceremonial head of state and is the second to eighth highest-ranking position in Chinese history, always under the leader of the Chinese Communist Party. Since 1993, the state representative is often, but not always, also the paramount leader of China. Under the current constitution, which does not officially define any office as the head of state, the state representative is the president. The role was created in 1954 when the first constitution consolidated the system of government in the People's Republic of China. At the time, the title was translated into English as State Chairman. The position was abolished between 1975 and 1982 with the functions of state representative being performed by the chairman of the Standing Committee of the National People's Congress. The presidency was revived under the fourth constitution in 1982.

== List of state representatives ==
Generations of leadership

First (Mao Zedong) Second (Deng Xiaoping) Third (Jiang Zemin) Fourth (Hu Jintao) Fifth (Xi Jinping)

=== Central People's Government (1949–1954) ===
Chairman of the Central People's Government

Portrait	Name (Lifespan)	Term of office		Vice Chairmen	Paramount leader
–	Mao Zedong 毛泽东 (1893–1976)	1 October 1949	27 September 1954	Zhu De; Liu Shaoqi; Soong Ching-ling; Li Jishen; Zhang Lan; Gao Gang	Himself
–	Mao Zedong 毛泽东 (1893–1976)	The first Chairman of the People's Republic of China. Mao also held more powerful offices as Chairman of the Chinese Communist Party and Chairman of the Central Military Commission, making him the Paramount leader of China.			

=== The 1st Constitution (1954–1975) ===
Chairman of the People's Republic of China

Portrait	Name (Birth–Death) Constituency		Term of office		NPC	Vice Chairman	Paramount leader
1	Mao Zedong 毛泽东 (1893–1976); Beijing At-large		27 September 1954	27 April 1959	I	Zhu De	Himself
2	Liu Shaoqi 刘少奇 (1898–1969); Beijing At-large		27 April 1959	21 December 1964	II	Soong Ching-ling & Dong Biwu (co-serving)	Mao Zedong
2	Liu Shaoqi 刘少奇 (1898–1969); Beijing At-large		21 December 1964	31 October 1968	III	Soong Ching-ling & Dong Biwu (co-serving)	Mao Zedong
2	Liu Shaoqi 刘少奇 (1898–1969); Beijing At-large		Ousted by Mao Zedong during the Cultural Revolution.				
–	Soong Ching-ling 宋庆龄 (1893–1981); Shanghai At-large	Dong Biwu 董必武 (1886–1975); Hubei At-large	31 October 1968	24 February 1972 (Soong) 17 January 1975 (Dong)	III	Vacancy by ascension	Mao Zedong
–	Soong Ching-ling 宋庆龄 (1893–1981); Shanghai At-large	Dong Biwu 董必武 (1886–1975); Hubei At-large	Soong was a member of the Revolutionary Committee of the Kuomintang. Both Soong Ching-ling and Dong Biwu co-served as Acting Chairpersons of the People's Republic of China until the resignation of Soong Ching-ling on 24 February 1972. Dong Biwu served the remainder of the term.				

=== The 2nd and 3rd Constitutions (1975–1982) ===
Chairman of the Standing Committee of the National People's Congress

Portrait	Name (Lifespan) Constituency	Term of office		NPC	Vice Chairmen	Paramount leader
–	Zhu De 朱德 (1886–1976); Sichuan At-large	17 January 1975	6 July 1976	IV	Soong Ching-ling; Dong Biwu (died 2 April 1975) and others	Mao Zedong
–	Soong Ching-ling 宋庆龄 (1893–1981); Shanghai At-large	6 July 1976	5 March 1978	IV		Mao Zedong; Hua Guofeng
–	Soong Ching-ling 宋庆龄 (1893–1981); Shanghai At-large	After Zhu De's death, Soong Ching-ling served as acting Chairwoman of the Standing Committee of the National People's Congress for the remainder of the 4th National People's Congress's term.				
–	Ye Jianying 叶剑英 (1897–1986); PLA	5 March 1978	18 June 1983	V	Soong Ching-ling and others	Hua Guofeng; Deng Xiaoping

Honorary Chairwoman of the People's Republic of China

Portrait	Name (Birth–Death) Constituency	Term of office		NPC	Notes
–	Soong Ching-ling 宋庆龄 (1893–1981); Shanghai At-large	16 May 1981	29 May 1981	V	Shortly before her death, Soong Ching-ling, a member of the Revolutionary Committee of the Kuomintang, was named Honorary Chairwoman of the People's Republic of China. She is the first and only Honorary President of the People's Republic of China.

=== The 4th Constitution (1983–present) ===
President of the People's Republic of China

Portrait	Name (Lifespan) Constituency	Term of office		NPC — (Election)	Vice President	Paramount leader
3	Li Xiannian 李先念 (1909–1992); Hubei At-large	18 June 1983	8 April 1988	VI — (62.5%)	Ulanhu	Deng Xiaoping
3	Li Xiannian 李先念 (1909–1992); Hubei At-large	During Li's term, China undertook major reforms in foreign policy, beginning to open up to the outside world. Li, who took on an important role in the ousting of the Gang of Four, became the first President of the People's Republic to visit the United States. He was also the first state president to visit North Korea. In 1984, Li met with U.S. President Ronald Reagan during Reagan's visit to China, notably discussing the status of Taiwan with the President. After leaving office as president, Li was then named Chairman of the National Committee of the CPPCC.				
4	Yang Shangkun 杨尚昆 (1907–1998); PLA	8 April 1988	27 March 1993	VII — (66.8%)	Wang Zhen	Deng Xiaoping; Jiang Zemin
4	Yang Shangkun 杨尚昆 (1907–1998); PLA	An elder from the party's revolutionary days, Yang was a political survivor of the Cultural Revolution. During his presidency, Yang promoted economic reform but opposed political liberalization. Yang reached the height of his political career after the 1989 Tiananmen Square protests and massacre, but his organized opposition to Jiang Zemin's leadership led Deng to force Yang to retire. Yang served as Vice Chairman of the Central Military Commission between 1983 and 1993.				
5	Jiang Zemin 江泽民 (1926–2022); Shanghai At-large	27 March 1993	15 March 1998	VIII — (68.4%)	Rong Yiren	Himself
5	Jiang Zemin 江泽民 (1926–2022); Shanghai At-large	15 March 1998	15 March 2003	IX — (71.5%)	Hu Jintao	Himself
5	Jiang Zemin 江泽民 (1926–2022); Shanghai At-large	Once the mayor and party secretary of Shanghai, Jiang's assumption of the presidency in 1993 marked a return to the centralization of major titles at the national level – Jiang also held the more powerful offices of General Secretary of the Chinese Communist Party and Chairman of the Central Military Commission since 1989. Under Jiang's leadership, China experienced substantial developmental growth with the reform and opening up, oversaw the handover of Hong Kong from the United Kingdom and Macau from Portugal, and improved its relations with the outside world while the Communist Party maintained its tight control over the government. Jiang was criticized for being too concerned about his personal image at home, and too conciliatory towards Russia and the United States abroad.				
6	Hu Jintao 胡锦涛 (born 1942); Tibet At-large (until 2008); Jiangsu At-large (from 2008)	15 March 2003	15 March 2008	X — (72.9%)	Zeng Qinghong	Himself
6	Hu Jintao 胡锦涛 (born 1942); Tibet At-large (until 2008); Jiangsu At-large (from 2008)	15 March 2008	14 March 2013	XI — (70.27%)	Xi Jinping	Himself
6	Hu Jintao 胡锦涛 (born 1942); Tibet At-large (until 2008); Jiangsu At-large (from 2008)	Hu, long having been anointed by Deng as Jiang's successor, took over the presidency in 2003, and also held the offices of General Secretary of the Communist Party and Chairman of the Central Military Commission. Hu presided over nearly a decade of consistent economic growth and a relatively smooth recovery from the 2008 financial crisis. China emerged as a major world power during Hu's term.				
7	Xi Jinping 习近平 (born 1953); Shanghai At-large (until 2018); Inner Mongolia At-large (2018–2023); Jiangsu At-large (from 2023)	14 March 2013	17 March 2018	XII — (72.21%)	Li Yuanchao	Himself
7	Xi Jinping 习近平 (born 1953); Shanghai At-large (until 2018); Inner Mongolia At-large (2018–2023); Jiangsu At-large (from 2023)	17 March 2018	10 March 2023	XIII — (71.10%)	Wang Qishan	Himself
7	Xi Jinping 习近平 (born 1953); Shanghai At-large (until 2018); Inner Mongolia At-large (2018–2023); Jiangsu At-large (from 2023)	10 March 2023	Incumbent	XIV — (70.60%)	Han Zheng	Himself
7	Xi Jinping 习近平 (born 1953); Shanghai At-large (until 2018); Inner Mongolia At-large (2018–2023); Jiangsu At-large (from 2023)	Xi became president in 2013, and also held the offices of General Secretary of the Communist Party and Chairman of the Central Military Commission since 2012. Xi increased the profile of the office of president in foreign affairs, for example receiving other heads of state during the 2015 China Victory Day Parade, going on high-profile visits to the United Kingdom and the United States, and making an important address at the Global Economic Forum in Davos, Switzerland. Under his leadership, Xi strengthened mass surveillance and launched Xinjiang re-education camps. Xi presided over anti-corruption campaign. In foreign policy, Xi advocated for "Wolf warrior diplomacy". Term limits for the president were removed in 2018.				

== Statistics ==
#	President	Date of birth	Age at ascension (first term)	Time in office (total)	Age at retirement (last term)	Date of death	Longevity
1	Mao Zedong	26 December 1893	60 years, 275 days	4 years, 212 days	64 years, 122 days	9 September 1976	82 years, 258 days
2	Liu Shaoqi	24 November 1898	60 years, 154 days	9 years, 187 days	69 years, 342 days	12 November 1969	70 years, 353 days
Presidency vacant
Acting	Dong Biwu	5 March 1886	85 years, 356 days	2 years, 327 days	88 years, 318 days	2 April 1975	89 years, 28 days
Hon.	Soong Ching-ling	27 January 1893	88 years, 109 days	Honorary	–	29 May 1981	88 years, 122 days
Presidency abolished
3	Li Xiannian	23 June 1909	73 years, 360 days	4 years, 295 days	78 years, 290 days	21 June 1992	82 years, 364 days
4	Yang Shangkun	3 August 1907	80 years, 250 days	4 years, 352 days	85 years, 236 days	14 September 1998	91 years, 42 days
5	Jiang Zemin	17 August 1926	66 years, 222 days	9 years, 353 days	76 years, 210 days	30 November 2022	96 years, 105 days
6	Hu Jintao	21 December 1942	60 years, 84 days	9 years, 365 days	70 years, 84 days	Living	83 years, 325 days (Living)
7	Xi Jinping	15 June 1953	59 years, 272 days	13 years, 242 days (Incumbent)	Incumbent	Living	73 years, 149 days (Living)

== Election results ==
No.	Year	Electoral college	Total Seats	President-elect	Voters	For	Against	Abstain	Result
1	1954	1st National People's Congress	1226	Mao Zedong	1210	1210	0	0	Elected
2	1959	2nd National People's Congress	1235	Liu Shaoqi					Elected
2	1964	3rd National People's Congress	3040	Liu Shaoqi					Elected
N/A	1975	4th National People's Congress	2864	Presidency vacant					
N/A	1978	5th National People's Congress	3497	Presidency abolished					
3	1983	6th National People's Congress	2978	Li Xiannian					Elected
4	1988	7th National People's Congress	2970	Yang Shangkun	2970	2812	124	34	Elected
5	1993	8th National People's Congress	2977	Jiang Zemin	2918	2858	35	25	Elected
5	1998	9th National People's Congress	2983	Jiang Zemin	2947	2882	36	29	Elected
6	2003	10th National People's Congress	2985	Hu Jintao	2944	2937	4	3	Elected
6	2008	11th National People's Congress	2987	Hu Jintao	2964	2956	3	5	Elected
7	2013	12th National People's Congress	2987	Xi Jinping	2956	2952	1	3	Elected
7	2018	13th National People's Congress	2980	Xi Jinping	2970	2970	0	0	Elected
7	2023	14th National People's Congress	2977	Xi Jinping	2952	2952	0	0	Elected

== See also ==
- List of Chinese leaders
- Leader of the Chinese Communist Party
- Order of precedence in China
- Paramount leader, an informal list of those who have been considered the highest leader of the party and the People's Republic of China
