= 1970 Draft Constitution of China =

Proposed constitution

Constitution of the People's Republic of China

Overview
- Original title: 中华人民共和国宪法
- Jurisdiction: China
- Ratified: Never ratified
- System: Unitary communist state
- Head of state: Mao Zedong
- Chambers: Unicameral (National People's Congress)
- Executive: State Council headed by the Premier of the State Council
- Author(s): Central Constitution Revision Drafting Committee
- Supersedes: 1954 Constitution of China

Full text
- zh:中华人民共和国宪法修改草案 (1970年) at Wikisource

The Draft Constitution of the People's Republic of China was a draft communist state constitution passed by the Second Plenary Session of the 9th Central Committee of the Chinese Communist Party in September 1970 during the Cultural Revolution. It was shelved because the 4th National People's Congress failed to convene as scheduled that year. After the Lin Biao incident, it was confiscated and destroyed because it included Lin Biao's name.

== History ==
After the 9th Party National Congress in 1969, Mao Zedong immediately began to work on a constitutional revision. A constitution draft group composed of Kang Sheng, Zhang Chunqiao, Wu Faxian, Li Zuopeng, and Ji Dengkui was established after a Politburo meeting chaired by Zhou Enlai on 8 March 1970. On 16 March, Zhou presided over a Politburo meeting on the "Request for Instructions on Constitutional Amendment" drafted by the Constitutional Working Group, which was presented to Mao Zedong and Lin Biao; Mao read and approved this report. From March 17 to 24, the 9th Central Committee of the Chinese Communist Party held a working meeting presided by Zhou to arrange the election of representatives to the 4th National People's Congress and put forward preliminary opinions on the amendment of the state constitution. The head of the Constitutional Working Group reported to the meeting on the work of the group on the evening of March 18. On July 10, Zhou presided over a Politburo meeting which decided to establish a Central Constitution Revision Drafting Committee with Mao Zedong and Lin Biao as the director and deputy director respectively. The group was established on 12 July.

The group held its first meeting on 17 July in the Jingxi Hotel chaired by Zhou; Mao and Lin were absent. On July 20, the Central Committee issued a notice on revising the constitution and discussing and approving the representatives of the 4th National People's Congress. Zhou presided over a meeting of the Central Constitution Revision Drafting Committee to discuss the implementation of the notice that evening. The commission discussed that the Constitution Working Group produced a total of 8 drafts from March to July, of which believed that there should be no state chairman. Some local officials believed that a state chairman should be appointed, and Mao should be the chairman, an opinion shared by the Politburo. Mao replied by saying "No, I will not be the chairman. Don't appoint people for positions based on their personalities". It was also discussed that the supreme commander of the armed forces should be the Chairman and Vice Chairman of the Central Committee of the Party. As Mao was unwilling to read the 60-article draft, which had 7,000 words, the draft was further compressed to 30 articles, with more than 4,000 words with the hope it could be reduced to 3,000 to 3,500 words.

On the evening of August 22, the Central Constitution Revision Drafting Committee held its last meeting in Lushan, Jiangxi. Zhou presided over the meeting with Mao and Lin not attending. Kang Sheng focused on simplifying the articles of the document. He said some people proposed People's Courts should be merged with public security organs, and that courts should become a part of the State Council. He also suggested that the flag of China should be revised, saying "Some people suggested two of the four stars on the five-star red flag should be reduced, that is, one bourgeoisie and one stinky intellectual should be reduced, and only workers and peasants should be needed" and the others said "there should be eight stars in total, the big one is Chairman Mao, and the seven small ones are 700 million people." Then, what should be done with the 800 million people in the future? Then we have to add more", others suggested "Draw a gun on this side and a pen on the other side. The gun barrel and the pen barrel should be drawn" while other proposed "Chairman Mao's book should be drawn in the middle. There must be a book if there is a pen." If Chairman Mao's book is drawn, then what about Chairman Mao? Then we have to add Chairman Mao's image", concluding by not adopting any changes to the flag. He also said some believe The East is Red should be adopted as the national anthem. Zhou talked after Kang, discussing the status of the state chairmanship. Zhou said the draft amendment was finalized.

The draft was immediately printed by the General Office for "discussion and approval" by the Second Plenary Session of the 9th Central Committee of the Chinese Communist Party. During the session on 23 August, Lin Biao said the characteristics of the constitution are "affirming Chairman Mao's status as a great leader, the head of the proletarian dictatorship, and the supreme commander". The draft constitution was passed by the Second Plenary Session in September 1970. Although the Draft was approved by the Central Committee on September 12 for grassroots units for discussion by the masses, it was shelved because the 4th National People's Congress failed to convene as scheduled that year. After the Lin Biao incident, it was confiscated and destroyed because it included Lin Biao's name. By the time the 4th NPC was convened in January 1975, the draft constitution became a thing of the past.

== Contents ==
The preface mentions the "continuing the revolution under the dictatorship of the proletariat". It mentions "proletarian dictatorship", replacing the people's democratic dictatorship in the 1954 constitution, as many as six times.

Article 1 says "The People's Republic of China is a socialist state under the dictatorship of the proletariat, led by the working class (through the Chinese Communist Party) and based on the worker-peasant alliance."; the 1954 constitution referred to the PRC as a people's democratic state.

Article 2 says "Chairman Mao Zedong is the great leader of the people of all ethnic groups in the country, the head of the dictatorship of the proletariat in our country, and the supreme commander of the whole country and the whole army. Vice Chairman Lin Biao is Chairman Mao's close comrade-in-arms and successor, and the deputy commander-in-chief of the whole country and the whole army." The title "head of the dictatorship of the proletariat" would have effectively made Mao the constitutionally-defined head of state.

Article 16 says "The National People's Congress is the highest state organ of power under the leadership of the Chinese Communist Party". Article 17 says "The powers of the National People's Congress are: to amend the Constitution, to enact laws, to appoint and remove the Premier and members of the State Council based on the proposal of the Central Committee of the Chinese Communist Party, to approve the national economic plan, the state budget and final accounts, and other powers that the National People's Congress believes it should exercise". These amendments would have dramatically curtailed the powers of the NPC compared to the 1954 constitution and given its proposing and decision-making powers to the CCP Central Committee, leaving it only with the powers to "approve" its resolutions, rendering the NPC as a complete constitutionally-defined rubber stamp body.

Article 18 assigns duties typically relegated to a head of state to the Standing Committee of the National People's Congress, as the state chairman position was abolished. It also similarly curtailed the powers of the NPC Standing Committee, including over-supervising the election of NPC delegates, supervising the State Council, the Supreme People's Court, and the Supreme People's Procuratorate, powers to revoke resolutions of the State Council or local governments, electing or removing the vice premiers, state councillors, secretary-general and members of the State Council, and deciding on the declaration of a state of war, on general or partial mobilization or martial law. The name of the NPCSC chair is also renamed in Chinese (from 委员长 to 主任) to a lesser title.

Article 19 states "The State Council is the Central People's Government. The State Council shall be responsible to and report to the National People's Congress and its Standing Committee", no longer describing it as "the executive organ of the highest organ of state power" or "the highest organ of state administration". Article 20 removes the State Council's powers to submit proposals to the NPC and its Standing Committee, change or revoke orders and instructions from ministers and directors of various committees or local state administrative organs at the local level, manage foreign trade and domestic trade, cultural, educational and health work, ethnic affairs, overseas Chinese affairs and foreign affairs, protecting national interests, maintaining public order, safeguarding citizens' rights, constructing of the armed forces, approving the division of local divisions and appointing and removing administrative personnel. All of these were simplified under "managing state administrative affairs", while the responsibility of constructing the armed forces was put under the Central Military Commission.

Article 25 states "People's courts at all levels shall be responsible to and report on their work to the people's congresses at the corresponding level and their permanent organs". It continues by saying "Presidents of the People's Courts at all levels shall be appointed and removed by the permanent organs of the People's Congress at the corresponding level". It adds "procuratorial power shall be exercised by public security organs at all levels", abolishing procuratorates. It stipulates that "the mass line must be implemented in the prosecution and trial of cases. For major counter-revolutionary criminal cases, the masses must be mobilized to discuss and criticize". The draft reduces the twelve articles of the 1954 constitution on courts and procuratorates to one article.

Article 26 states "The most basic rights and obligations of citizens are to support Chairman Mao and his close comrade-in-arms, Vice Chairman Lin, to support the leadership of the Chinese Communist Party, to support the dictatorship of the proletariat, to support the socialist system, and to obey the Constitution and laws of the People's Republic of China".

== See also ==
- Constitutional history of China
