= Supreme State Conference =

Chinese government meeting

The Supreme State Conference (Chinese: 最高国务会议; pinyin: Zuìgāo Guówù Huìyì) was a meeting convened by the Chairman of the People's Republic of China when necessary, in accordance with Article 43 of the 1954 Constitution of China. It discussed major national affairs, and varied in terms of its frequency, duration and participants. It was disestablished following the abolition of the state chairmanship in 1975, and remained abolished when the office was restored in 1982.

== History ==
The Supreme State Conference was established with the adoption of the 1954 Constitution of China. When he was state chairman from 1954 to 1959, Mao Zedong convened a total of 16 Supreme State Conferences, including five by the end of 1955, four each in 1956 and 1957, two in 1958, and one in 1959. The number of participants fluctuated greatly, ranging from 37 in the tenth conference to 1,800 in the eleventh conference. The duration of the conferences ranged from half day to several days. The Supreme State Conferences were an important way Mao exercised power and devised policies. Under Liu Shaoqi, there were a total of 6 Supreme State Conferences; compared to those under Mao, these were much smaller in frequency, duration, participants, and scope of issues.

The 1975 Constitution abolished the positions of chairman and vice chairman, and also abolished the Supreme State Conference. Since then, no provisions concerning the Supreme State Conference have appeared in the constitution. The 1982 Constitution reinstated the position of state chairmanship (now known in English as "president", although the Chinese title remained unchanged), but the president had lost the power to interfere in national political decision-making, becoming a purely ceremonial figurehead (though in practice, the office is now usually held concurrently with that of General Secretary, rendering its holder immensely powerful).

== Description ==
The Supreme State Conference was convened and chaired by the chairman of the People's Republic of China. The detailed content of the meeting was not explicitly stated, but the 1954 constitution required the participation of the vice chairman of the People's Republic of China, the chairman of the Standing Committee of the National People's Congress, the premier of the State Council, and participants generally also included other major leaders of democratic parties. As the 1954 constitution only offered vague details about the Supreme State Conference, it became very flexible in practice in terms of its frequency, duration, and participants. The Supreme State Conference discussed major national affairs, and the chairman of the state then forwarded the opinions raised at the meeting to the National People's Congress and its Standing Committee, the State Council, and other relevant departments for discussion and decision-making. Therefore, the chairman of the state at that time possessed actual power in national affairs and could be considered effectively the head of state.
