= Continuous Revolution Theory =

Element of Mao Zedong Thought

The Continuous Revolution Theory (Chinese: 继续革命论, sometimes also translated as the theory of continuing revolution under the dictatorship of the proletariat) is an element of Maoism. This is often subsumed under the subject of the Cultural Revolution.

== Overview ==
The Continuous Revolution Theory is rooted in Mao's thoughts regarding the nature of contradiction. He argues that, since contradictions within society between revolutionary and reactionary elements can be expected to continue for a long time, it is necessary to work continuously toward the progressive fulfillment of the revolutionary program. As Mao has written:

"Every difference in men's concepts should be regarded as reflecting an objective contradiction. Objective contradictions are in subjective thinking, and this process constitutes the contradictory movement of concepts, pushes forward the development of thought, and ceaselessly solves problems in man's thinking."

The contention that contradiction is inherent to everything is thus taken to suggest that revolution must be continual if it is not to succumb to reactionary forces. The Continuous Revolution Theory is rooted in this fundamental insight regarding the nature of contradiction. It suggests that a revolution cannot really be "over" because contradictions will continue to develop, such that it is necessary to perpetually resolve emergent contradictions in favor of the revolutionary program while resisting the risk of sliding back into reaction. The Continuous Revolution Theory thus rejects any notion of a revolution that is once and for all, since it is impossible to remove contradiction per se from the fabric of nature. Starr makes it clear that contradiction is the central concept of the Continuous Revolution Theory in his discussion of the key themes of the theory:

"These themes are, first, that contradiction or conflict in a society is ubiquitous and permanent and that this condition applies just as surely to a society in the process of socialist transformation as it does to a bourgeois or feudal society."

== Relationship to the Cultural Revolution ==
The Continuous Revolution Theory is closely related to but not identical with the Cultural Revolution. More specifically, it was the guiding ideology of the Cultural Revolution, with the latter thus being how the Chinese Communist Party (CCP) attempted to implement Continuous Revolution Theory. The Cultural Revolution was itself a result of Mao's perception, in 1966, that the CCP leadership itself had become corrupted:

"Believing that current Communist leaders were taking the party, and China itself, in the wrong direction, Mao called on the nation's youth to purge the 'impure' elements of Chinese society and revive the revolutionary spirit that had led to victory in the civil war 20 years ago and the formation of the People's Republic of China."

== Historical evaluation ==
Mao believed that revolutions can betray themselves and that the new ruling class that emerges in the aftermath of a revolution may itself need to be challenged through a process of continuous revolution. However, the Cultural Revolution that was driven by the Continuous Revolution Theory was marked by atrocities and may not always be interpreted as serving truly revolutionary ends. After the death of Mao and the arrest of the Gang of Four, the CCP has lost interest in continuous revolution. The outcome of the Cultural Revolution raises questions about whether the Continuous Revolution Theory is actually practicable.

== 1975 Chinese Constitution ==
The Continuous Revolution Theory is mentioned in the preamble of the 1975 Chinese constitution, which replaced the 1954 constitution and was written in the spirit of the Cultural Revolution.
