= President of China =

State representative of the People's Republic of China

President of the People's Republic of China
- 中华人民共和国主席
- National Emblem of China

- Flag of China

- Incumbent; Xi Jinping since 14 March 2013
- Style: Mr. President (主席先生) (informal); His Excellency (阁下) (diplomatic)
- Type: State representative
- Status: National-level official (second-highest ranking official) (Note: Rank after the CCP General Secretary.)
- Reports to: National People's Congress and its Standing Committee
- Residence: Zhongnanhai
- Seat: Beijing
- Nominator: Presidium of the National People's Congress
- Appointer: National People's Congress
- Term length: Five years, renewable
- Constituting instrument: Constitution of China
- Precursor: Chairman of the Central People's Government (1949–1954)
- Formation: 27 September 1954; 72 years ago (current form)
- First holder: Mao Zedong
- Abolished: 1975–1982
- Deputy: Vice President
- Salary: CN¥136,620 per annum est. (2015) (US$18,721)

President of the People's Republic of China
- Simplified Chinese: 中华人民共和国主席
- Traditional Chinese: 中華人民共和國主席
Transcriptions
Standard Mandarin
- Hanyu Pinyin: Zhōnghuá Rénmín Gònghéguó zhǔxí

Alternative name
- Simplified Chinese: （中国）国家主席
- Traditional Chinese: （中國）國家主席
Transcriptions
Standard Mandarin
- Hanyu Pinyin: (Zhōngguó) guójiā zhǔxí

The president of the People's Republic of China is the state representative of the People's Republic of China. On its own, it is a ceremonial office and has no real power in China's political system, though since 1993, the post has been concurrently held by the general secretary of the Chinese Communist Party (CCP) and chairman of the Central Military Commission, who is the country's paramount leader. While the office has many of the characteristics of a head of state, the country's constitution does not define it as such.

The presidency in its current form originated from the chairman of the Central People's Government of the People's Republic of China, which was established on 1 October 1949 by a decision of the Chinese People's Political Consultative Conference. It was replaced in the 1954 constitution with the office of state chairman. It was successively held by Mao Zedong and Liu Shaoqi. Liu fell into political disgrace during the Cultural Revolution, after which the presidency became vacant. The post of chairman was abolished under the 1975 constitution, and the function of state representative was bestowed on the chairman of the Standing Committee of the National People's Congress. The office was reinstated in the 1982 constitution but with reduced powers and a stipulation that the president could not serve more than two consecutive terms. The Chinese president was the third to fifth highest-ranking position when it was re-established in 1982. The term limits were abolished in 2018. Since 1982, the title's official English-language translation has been "president", although the Chinese title remains unchanged. (Note: In Chinese, the president of the PRC is termed zhǔxí, while the presidents of other countries are termed zǒngtǒng. Furthermore, zhǔxí continues to mean "chairman" in a generic context. Incidentally, the president of the Republic of China is termed zǒngtǒng.)

The presidency is a part of the system of people's congress based on the principle of unified state power in which the National People's Congress (NPC) functions as the sole branch of government and as the supreme state organ of power. The presidency is a state organ of the NPC and equivalent to, for instance, the State Council and the National Supervisory Commission, rather than a political office, unlike the premier of the State Council. Together with the NPC Standing Committee, the presidency performs certain functions performed by a head of state in most other countries. The president can engage in state affairs with the consent of the NPC Standing Committee, but has no independent powers other than those bestowed by China's permanent organ. While the presidency is not a powerful organ in itself, since 27 March 1993, the president has concurrently served as general secretary of the Central Committee of the Chinese Communist Party (CCP) and chairman of the Central Military Commission (CMC), making the incumbent China's paramount leader and supreme commander of the armed forces.

== History ==
=== Background ===
In 1912, after the overthrow of the Qing dynasty and the establishment of the Republic of China, the presidency was established, which replaced the emperor as China's head of state. Chinese revolutionary Sun Yat-sen served as the first president but soon gave up the presidency to Qing general Yuan Shikai in exchange for the peaceful abdication of the Qing emperor and unification of China. The president had the powers to call the National Assembly, to appoint and remove government officials, to submit or veto the legislate bills, to promulgate law, to declare war, to enter treaties, to lead the army and to pardon. In 1915, Yuan proclaimed himself Emperor of China in a largely unpopular move and was forced to retract his declaration shortly before his death in 1916. Due to the subsequent instability of the Beiyang government, the president was often not able to exercise power throughout the country.

Sun Yat-sen led the Kuomintang to establish a rival government in Guangzhou. Sun died in 1925 with no clear successor and leadership of the government, now named the National Government; the Chairman of the National Government, though not given specific presidential powers, took on the functions of a de facto head of state. In 1928, the Northern Expedition led to the replacement of the Beiyang government by the Nationalist Government. The new Constitution of the Republic of China, promulgated in 1947, established a five-branch government with the office of president (Chinese: 總統) as head of state. On 20 May 1948, Chiang Kai-shek was formally elected by the National Assembly to be the first term president.

In 1948, with increasing successes during the Chinese Civil War, the Chinese Communist Party (CCP) started to draft plans for a new central government. From 3 to 15 March, the 7th CCP Central Committee held its second plenary session, where it was agreed that a new central government would be based on the Soviet model in which Mao would serve as the government chairman. On 29 September 1949, the Preparatory Committee for the New Political Consultative Conference adopted the Common Program, which established the Central People's Government Council as the collective head of state. Mao was then elected as the chairman of the Central People's Government. On 1 October 1949, Mao declared the establishment of the People's Republic of China. The powers of the chairman of the Central People's Government included leading the Central People's Government Council and directing other members of the council, meaning the chairman was not just the first among equals among the council members and was superior to them. In addition, due to the size of the council, the chairman performed the functions of head of state on behalf of the council, including receiving foreign visitors.

=== Establishment in 1954 ===
On 27 December 1953, Mao Zedong led a team of CCP members to draft a new constitution in Hangzhou. During his drafts, Mao proposed the establishment of a new office titled the Chairman of the People's Republic of China. On 23 March 1954, at the first meeting of the Constitution Drafting Committee, Mao explained why the position was established: "In order to ensure national security, a Chairman was established. Our China is a large country, and the purpose of establishing a Chairman is to make the country more secure. With a Speaker of Parliament, a Premier, and a Chairman, it is safer, and it will not be that all three places will have problems at the same time." The CCP leadership considered that, by adding several more layers to the government leadership, national security would be strengthened by making it harder to eliminate the top leadership in the case of a crisis. Mao also said that the chairmanship could function as a "buffer" between the State Council and the Standing Committee of the National People's Congress (NPCSC) and balance both branches of the government.

The members of the Constitution Drafting Committee discussed the powers of the State Chairman. They thought that the powers of the chairman should be set lower and more detached, so that the chairman would only be equivalent to "half of [Kliment] Voroshilov [then Chairman of the Presidium of the Supreme Soviet of the Soviet Union]." They added that "The Chairman can make suggestions, but the suggestions do not play a decisive role. People can take them if they want, or not if they don't. There is nothing that can be done." Mao added that "He (the chairman) cannot act on his own. He is not opposed to the National People's Congress and its Standing Committee. Instead, he follows them". He said that since the chairmanship would be different from a Western-style president, the chairman would not have the authority to dissolve the National People's Congress.

The office of state chairman (the original English translation) was established under the 1954 Constitution. Mao also rejected the suggestion that the chairman should serve as the head of state, while Liu Shaoqi explained that the powers of the head of state would be jointly exercised by the chairman and the NPCSC. Though the ceremonial powers of the office were largely identical to those in the current Constitution, the powers of the 1954 office differed from those of the current office in two areas: military and governmental. The chairman shared decision-making over the military together with the State Council. The state chairman's military powers were defined in the 1954 Constitution as follows: "The Chairman of the People's Republic of China commands the armed forces of the state, and is chairman of the National Defense Commission." The National Defense Commission was unique to the 1954 Constitution, and was mandated as the civil command for the People's Liberation Army. It was abolished under the 1975 Constitution.

Mao said that the powers of the executive rested in the State Council, and the chairman could not intervene in them. The state chairman's governmental powers were defined in the 1954 Constitution as follows: "The Chairman of the People's Republic of China, whenever necessary, convenes a Supreme State Conference and acts as its chairman." The members of the Supreme State Conference included the main officers of state, and its views were to be presented to the main organs of state and government, including the National People's Congress and the State and National Defense Councils. The Supreme State Conference was also unique to the 1954 Constitution. It was abolished under the 1975 Constitution and later Constitutions have not included a similar body. The chairman also had the powers to appoint and remove key officials of the State Council, including the premier and vice premier, in accordance with the decision of the NPC and NPCSC. Though initial drafts gave the chairman the powers to independently appoint and removed local government heads, this clause was later deleted.

=== History up to 1974 ===
CCP chairman Mao Zedong was the first to hold the office of state chairman. He was elected at the founding session of the National People's Congress in 1954. In 1956, Mao proposed resigning as state chairman, saying he did not want to be re-elected for a second term. At the 2nd NPC in 1959, Mao was succeeded by Liu Shaoqi, first-ranked Vice Chairman of the Chinese Communist Party. Liu was reelected as state chairman at the 3rd NPC in Jan 1965. During his tenure, Liu took a more active role in the diplomatic functions of the chairman compared to Mao, undertaking more state visits and signing more treaties. However, his influence over the military was hindered by Mao's control over it. He also convened far fewer Supreme State Conferences compared to Mao. In 1966, Mao launched the Cultural Revolution and by August 1966 Mao and his supporters succeeded in removing Liu from his position as party vice chairman. A few months later Liu was placed under house arrest, and after a prolonged power struggle, the 12th Plenum of the 8th CCP Central Committee stripped Liu Shaoqi of all his party and non-party positions on 31 October 1968, including the post of state chairman. This was in violation of the Constitution, which required a vote by the NPC to remove the state chairman. After Liu's removal in 1968, the office of state chairman was vacant. From 1972 to 1975, Vice Chairman Dong Biwu became the acting chairman.

=== Abolition in 1975 ===
When the 4th NPC was convened in 1975, its main act was to adopt a new Constitution which eliminated the office of state chairman and emphasized instead the leadership of the Communist Party over the state, including an article that made the CCP chairman supreme commander of the PLA in concurrence as chairman of the party CMC, while the duties of state representative were transferred to the chairman of the Standing Committee of the National People's Congress. The 5th NPC was convened two years early, in 1978, and a third Constitution was adopted, which also lacked the office of state chairman, but did place a greater emphasis on the ceremonial roles performed by the chairman of the Standing Committee of the National People's Congress as state representative.

=== Restoration in 1982 ===
In 1980, Chinese leader Deng Xiaoping agreed to revise the constitution, leading questions to whether to restore the presidency to arise. Research showed that having the NPCSC chairman as the national representative created problems, as the position was equivalent to the speaker of parliament in other countries. Some constitutional drafters were opposed to restoring the presidency as it had been abolished for a long time, that it had no real powers, and that keeping it abolished would help guard against a rise of a new cult of personality. Others argued in support of restoring it by saying its restoration would not lead to a resurgence in authoritarianism, normalize political life, and help separate the Party and government and counteract concertation of powers in a single branch. They argued that as China was a large country with a significant amount of international exchanges, the president would help in diplomatic functions, as other heads of state may not appreciate being invited by other officials such as the chairman of the NPCSC. They argued this would alleviate the work pressures of the NPCSC chairman and the premier.

Deng supported restoring the presidency in Politburo Standing Committee meetings. On a 18 March 1981 meeting, he said that "we had better to restore the presidency. China is a great country and it will be beneficial for the country to have a chairman". However, he wanted the presidency to not have powers in specific government affairs, saying "It is still necessary to have a President. It is better to have a President to represent the country, but the powers of the President can be defined in a more abstract way. He should not be in charge of specific work or interfere in specific government affairs". After a draft including the presidency was submitted to the CCP for approval, a Politburo member said Deng was the only person who would fit the new office if it was created, and it should not be established if Deng did not take it. Deng counteracted by saying the state system should not be decided for the sake of one person, and the presidency was kept in subsequent revisions. Though initial drafts stipulated that the chairman commands the military as the National Defense Commission chairman, this clause and the defense commission were eventually deleted, and a separate chairman of the Central Military Commission post was established, removing the president's powers over the military. Additionally, the Supreme State Conference was abolished.

The office was reinstated in the fourth Constitution, adopted by the 5th Session of the 5th NPC in 1982. In the 1982 Constitution, the party developed policy while the state executed it, and the president was conceived of as a ceremonial and replacement figure with a role similar to that of equivalent of figurehead presidents in parliamentary republics. Actual state power was vested in the general secretary of the Communist Party, the premier, and the chairman of the Central Military Commission. As part of the effort to prevent another leader from rising above the party as Mao had done, all four posts were intended to be held by separate people. The president therefore performed ceremonial duties such as greeting foreign dignitaries and signing the appointment of embassy staff, and did not intervene in the affairs of the State Council or the party. The constitution also mandated term limits for the office, stipulating the president and vice president could not serve more than two consecutive terms. The title of the office (Chinese: 国家主席; pinyin: Guójiā Zhǔxí), which literally translates to "state chairman", was unchanged in the Chinese text, but a new English translation of "President of the People's Republic of China" has been adopted since 1982, instead of "Chairman of the People's Republic of China".

The posts of the premier, president and CCP general secretary were held by different individuals in the 1980s. That said, in reality political power was concentrated on the chairman of the Central Military Commission Deng Xiaoping. He was effectively the paramount leader, as he had controlled the Party, government and the military from "behind the scenes" without holding any of the three posts. However, presidents Li Xiannian (1983–1988) and Yang Shangkun (1988–1993) were not simple figureheads, but actually significant players in the highest leadership. They derived most of their power from being amongst the Eight Elders, rather than the office of president.

In the 1990s, the experiment of separating party and state posts, which led to conflict between Deng Xiaoping and Zhao Ziyang during the Tiananmen Square protests of 1989, was terminated. In 1993, Jiang Zemin, who had been general secretary of the CCP and chairman of the Central Military Commission since 1989, assumed the presidency as well, becoming the undisputed top leader of the party and the state. Jiang stepped down as president in 2003, handing the post to then–Vice President Hu Jintao, the first vice president to assume the office. Hu had already become general secretary in 2002. In the 2004 constitutional amendment, incorporating the power to "engage in activities involving state affairs" to the presidency. Hu vacated both offices for Xi Jinping in 2012 and 2013, who had also previously served as vice president under Hu. On 11 March 2018, the first session of the 13th National People's Congress, by a vote of 2,958 in favor, two opposed and three abstaining, passed a constitutional amendment that removed the previous term limits for the president and the vice president. Xi explained the decision in terms of needing to align the presidency with his more powerful posts of general secretary of the party and CMC chairman, which do not have term limits.

== Selection ==
=== Eligibility ===
Article 79 of the Constitution sets three qualifications for being elected for the presidency. To serve as president, one must:

- be a Chinese citizen;
- have the right to vote and stand for election;
- be at least 45 years old.

=== Election ===
According to the Organic Law of the National People's Congress (NPC), constitutionally China's supreme state organ of power, the president is nominated by the NPC Presidium, the Congress's presiding body. However, the nomination is effectively made by the Chinese Communist Party, with the decisions being made among Party leaders. Candidates for top positions including the president are first approved by the CCP's Politburo Standing Committee, and then by the Politburo, then approved in a plenary session the Central Committee. The NPC Standing Committee elects the NPC Presidium, which then presides over the NPC. During the NPC's first session, the Presidium presents the nominee. Although the Presidium could theoretically nominate multiple candidates for the presidency, leading the election to be competitive, it has always nominated a single candidate for the office. After the nomination, the president is elected by the NPC, which also has the power to remove the president and other state officers from office. Elections and removals are decided by majority vote. The length of the president's term of office is the same as the NPC, which is 5 years. Since 2018, the president is required to recite the constitutional oath of office before assuming office.

== Powers and duties ==
The president functions as the state representative of China both internally and externally. According to the constitution, the presidency is not a position but a state organ that represents the PRC in state activities, but one person serves the presidency. Mao Zedong rejected that the president of China functioned as China's head of state, arguing instead that the major differences between the Soviet system and the Chinese was that the presidency acted as a representative of the state collective leadership. Liu Shaoqi in his report on the 1954 Constitution of China, stated that the powers of the Chinese head of state was jointly exercised by the permanent organ, the Standing Committee of the National People's Congress and the president. The president has no independent powers other than those bestowed by China's permanent organ.

Under the current constitution, the president has the power issue orders to promulgate laws, select and dismiss the premier (head of government), (Note: In theory, the president has discretion in selecting the premier, though in practice, the premier has historically been selected through the top-level discussions of the Chinese Communist Party. Upon the premier's nomination, the NPC convenes to confirm the nomination, but since only one name is on the ballot, it can only approve or reject. To date, it has never rejected a personnel nomination. Since the premier, the head of government in China, is the most important political appointment in the Chinese government, the nomination power, under some circumstances, may give the president real political influence.) appoint vice premiers, state councillors as well as ministers of the State Council upon the nomination of the premier, grant presidential pardons, declare states of emergency, issue mass mobilization orders, and issue state honours. In addition, the president names and dismisses ambassadors to foreign countries and signs and annuls treaties with foreign entities. According to the Constitution, all of these powers require the approval or confirmation of the National People's Congress (NPC) or its Standing Committee, which the office is subject to. The president also conducts state visits on behalf of the People's Republic. (Note: Currently, a specially configured Boeing 747-8i is used to carry the president on international trips. See Air transports of heads of state and government#China for more details.) Under the constitution, the "state visit" clause is the only presidential power that does not stipulate any form of oversight from the NPC. As the vast majority of presidential powers are dependent on the ratification of the NPC, the president is, in essence, a symbolic post without any direct say in the governance of the state. It is, therefore, conceived to mainly function as a symbolic institution of the state rather than an office with true executive powers. The Office of the President assists the president in their ceremonial and diplomatic functions.

The actual powers of the president has effectively been dependent on the officeholder. Since 1993, the presidency has been held concurrently by the general secretary of the Party Central Committee and chairman of the Central Military Commission (CMC), effectively making the officeholder China's paramount leader. The system of holding the three posts simultaneously has officially been referred to as the "three-in-one" leadership system (“三位一体”领导体制), allowing the paramount leader to exercise leadership over the Chinese Communist Party, the People's Republic of China and the People's Liberation Army and thus strengthening the Party's leadership over all sectors of society.

== Political ranking ==
The ranking of the presidency throughout PRC history has varied. The presidency has been the second-highest-ranking official in China's political system after the CCP general secretary since 1989. The political ranking of the presidency has changed throughout the decades, influenced by the officeholder of the time. 2nd President Liu Shaoqi was also the first-ranked vice chairman of the Chinese Communist Party, and ranked second in the Chinese Communist Party, behind CCP Chairman Mao Zedong. President Li Xiannian was also the 5th ranked member of the CCP Politburo Standing Committee, after the CCP general secretary and Chinese premier. President Yang Shangkun was not a member of CCP Politburo Standing Committee, but he ranked third after CCP general secretary Zhao Ziyang/Jiang Zemin and CMC chairman Deng Xiaoping. Since Jiang Zemin's accession to the office in 1993, the president was also the general secretary of the Chinese Communist Party, ranking first in party and state.

== Line of succession ==
Article 84 of the Constitution of China. If the office of president falls vacant, then the vice president succeeds to the office. If both offices fall vacant, then the chairman of the NPC Standing Committee temporarily acts as president until the NPC can hold a by-election to elect a new president and vice president.

=== Current line of succession ===
No.	Position	Incumbent	Party
1	Vice President of the People's Republic of China	Han Zheng	Communist
2	Chairman of the Standing Committee of the National People's Congress	Zhao Leji	Communist

== See also ==
- List of presidents of China
- List of state representatives of the People's Republic of China
- List of leaders of the People's Republic of China
- List of Chinese leaders
- Party and state leaders
- First Lady of China
