= Common Program =

Provisional constitution of the People's Republic of China

Common Program of the Chinese People's Political Consultative Conference
- Chinese People's Political Consultative Conference logo

Overview
- Jurisdiction: China
- Date effective: 29 September 1949
- Head of state: Chairman of the Central People's Government of the People's Republic of China
- Repealed: Never formally repealed; superseded by the 1954 Constitution of China
- Supersedes: Constitution of the Republic of China

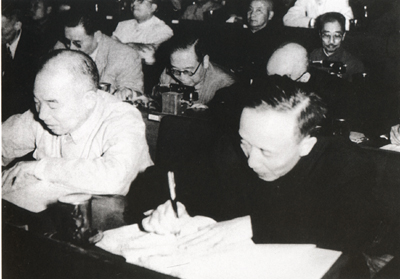
Picture of CPPCC members when the Common Program was discussed and passed at the conference in 1949.

The Common Program was the primary general policy document passed by the first plenary session of the Chinese People's Political Consultative Conference in September 1949. Replacing the constitution of the Republic of China, the Common Program served as the provisional constitution of the People's Republic of China (PRC) from 1949 until September 1954, when the PRC's first formal constitution was passed and ratified by the 1st National People's Congress.

== Background ==
On September 29, 1949, the First Plenary Session of the Chinese People's Political Consultative Conference unanimously adopted the Common Program as the basic political program for the country following the success of the Chinese Communist Revolution.

The Common Program functioned as China's provisional constitution until 1954.

== Provisions ==
The Common Program was composed of a preamble and seven chapters. It defined China as a "New Democracy" which would practice a "people's democratic dictatorship" led by the proletariat and based on an alliance of workers and peasants which would unite all of China's "democratic classes" (defined as those opposing imperialism, feudalism, and bureaucratic capitalism and favoring an independent China).

The Common Program described people's congresses as the primary organs through which the people would exercise state power. It stated that the National People's Congress was the highest body of state power. According to the Common Program, all state organs should practice democratic centralism.

The Common Program described the primary task of the new government as eliminating feudal, compradorial, and fascist ideologies.

Generally, the Common Program prioritized ownership of the state-owned economy, although it also gave consideration to some private interests. It did not seek to eliminate capitalism as a whole, instead encouraging private enterprises viewed as beneficial to the national economy and sought to implement a mixed economy.

In Article 26, the Common Program defines "development of production" as the primary goal intended to be achieved through the establishment of socialist relations of production. It states, "The basic principle for the economic construction of the People's Republic of China is ... to achieve the goal of developing production and a flourishing economy ... to promote the development of the entire society and economy."

The Common Program addresses agriculture in Article 34, stating that "the People's Government should organize peasants and all labor power that can carry out agricultural work to ... [develop] agricultural production ... Every step of land reform should be integrated with the revival and development of agricultural production."

Article 35 emphasized the development of heavy industry, such as mining, iron and steel, power, machinery, electrical industry, and the chemical industry "in order to build a foundation for the industrialization of the nation."

Regarding China's foreign policy, Articles 54 and 56 state that China's foreign relations would be based on respect for mutual sovereignty.

== Academic analysis ==
Researcher Zheng Qian compares the Common Program's support for an economy with mixed forms of ownership to Vladimir Lenin's New Economic Policy during the post-1921 transitional period in the Soviet Union.

== See also ==
- Constitutional history of China
- Constitution of China
