= 4th National People's Congress =

1975–1978 Chinese legislative session

4th National People's Congress 第四届全国人民代表大会
- National emblem of China

13 January 1975 – 26 February 1978 (3 years, 44 days) Overview
- Type: Supreme organ of state power
- Election: Indirect elections

Leadership
- Chairman: Zhu De (until 6 July 1976)
- Vice Chairmen: Dong Biwu (until 2 April 1975), Soong Ching-ling, Kang Sheng (until 16 December 1975), Liu Bocheng, Wu De, Wei Guoqing, Saifuddin Azizi, Guo Moruo, Xu Xiangqian, Nie Rongzhen, Chen Yun, Tan Zhenlin, Li Jingquan, Zhang Dingcheng, Cai Chang, Ulanhu, Ngapoi Ngawang Jigme, Zhou Jianren, Xu Deheng, Hu Juewen, Li Suwen, and Yao Lianwei
- Secretary-General: Ji Pengfei
- Standing Committee: 168 (4th)

Members
- Total: 2,864 members

4th National People's Congress
- Traditional Chinese: 第四屆全國人民代表大會
- Simplified Chinese: 第四届全国人民代表大会
Transcriptions
Standard Mandarin
- Hanyu Pinyin: Dìsì Jiè Quánguó Rénmín Dàibiǎo Dàhuì

Abbreviation
- Traditional Chinese: 第四屆全國人大
- Simplified Chinese: 第四届全国人大
Transcriptions
Standard Mandarin
- Hanyu Pinyin: Dìsì Jiè Quánguó Réndà

The 4th National People's Congress (NPC) was in session from 1975 to 1978. It held only one session, in January 1975, despite the Constitution mandating a session be held each year. There were 2864 deputies to this Congress.

== Seat distribution ==
Major party	Seats
Chinese Communist Party	2,615
Other Parties	Seats
Independents	270

== The first session ==
The first session passed the 1975 Constitution of the People's Republic of China. The offices of Chairman and Vice Chairman were abolished at the suggestion of Chairman Mao Zedong, passing the role of head of state to the Chairman of the Standing Committee of the National People's Congress. This was part of the Chinese Cultural Revolution, which ended the following year.

- Chairman and Vice Chairman: Posts abolished
- Chairman of the Standing Committee of the National People's Congress: Zhu De
- Premier of the State Council: Zhou Enlai
- President of the Supreme People's Court: Jiang Hua
- Procurator-General of the Supreme People's Procuratorate: Post abolished
