= Abolition of the presidency in China =

The dispute over the abolition of the presidency of the People's Republic of China (formerly called Chairman of the PRC in the 1954 Constitution) led to a broader power struggle between Mao Zedong, Chairman of the Chinese Communist Party, and Marshal Lin Biao, Vice Chairman of the Chinese Communist Party, the Defense Minister and Mao's appointed successor along with some members of the 9th Politburo of the Chinese Communist Party during the middle of the Cultural Revolution. This dispute was later interpreted by the Chinese Communist Party (CCP) as evidence that Lin Biao had tried to usurp the party and seize power.

Beginning in March 1970, during the discussion of the 1970 Draft Constitution of China, Mao proposed abolishing the state presidency, which was opposed by many party leaders including Lin Biao. Some members of the 9th Central Committee supported restoring the ceremonial position with Mao taking up the post once again which he had relinquished in 1959. The dispute came to a head at the Second Plenary Session in Lushan in August 1970, where intense factional strife had led Mao to conclude that a political conspiracy led by Lin was underway and led to the purging of chief political theorist Chen Boda, who had supported Lin. Under Mao's orders, the presidency would be abolished. However, the relationship between Lin and Mao began to deteriorate.

The feud simmered into 1971, with Lin Biao refusing to make any self-criticism. Mao concluded that Lin was politically unreliable and began to made plans to purge him. Lin's son, Lin Liguo, an officer in the PLA Air Force, fearing that they would be purged next, allegedly began to make plans to overthrow Mao in a coup d'état, which would later be known as Project 571. While Mao was on a tour in Southern China in September 1971, he publicly accused Lin of trying to overthrow him for the first time. Lin Liguo decided to execute the operation, which eventually failed. On September 12, as Mao safely returned to Beijing, Lin and his family decided to flee to Guangzhou or to the Soviet Union. In the middle of the night, they boarded a plane and fled China, but the plane ran out of fuel and crashed in Mongolia, killing everyone on board.

After Lin Biao's defection, the preparatory work for the 4th National People's Congress was suspended and the process of constitutional amendment was interrupted. In 1975, the 1975 Constitution of China adopted by the 4th National People's Congress formally abolished this position.

After Mao's death, the CCP continued to use the argument that the events at the Second Plenum Session at Lushan proved that Lin was guilty of plotting to overthrow Mao. The presidency was eventually restored in 1982.

== Background ==
After the outbreak of the Cultural Revolution in 1966, President Liu Shaoqi had lost favor with Mao, who had perceived him as an enemy after Mao was sidelined following the disastrous Great Leap Forward and was forced to retreat to a secondary position till his political comeback in the Cultural Revolution. At the 12th Plenary Session in 1968, Liu Shaoqi was removed from all his posts within and outside the party and expelled from the party. The following year, Liu died of illness in prison. After Liu was dismissed, the position of chairman was vacant. The two Vice Presidents at the time, Soong Ching-ling and Dong Biwu, served as acting presidents, but did not succeed Liu.

Political power was split between Lin, who led the People's Liberation Army and Mao's wife Jiang Qing, who was the deputy leader of the Cultural Revolution Group. By 1969, the political alliance between the two had devolved into a hidden rivalry. Within the Politburo, both Lin and Jiang had equal power in theory, but Lin was uncertain about Jiang Qing's privileged relationship with Mao, who did not always take her side. At the same time, Mao became increasing uncomfortable with Lin giving orders without his authorization to mobilize the army at the height of the Sino-Soviet border conflict. Chief political theorist Chen Boda increasingly took Lin's side after falling out with Jiang and the Cultural Revolution Group.

== Prelude ==
Following the 9th National Congress of the Chinese Communist Party in 1969, Mao Zedong decided to convene the 4th National People's Congress and draft a new constitution. The issue of the presidency was one of the main agendas, and Mao set out guidelines whereby the presidency was to be abolished and its ceremonial functions be delegated to the Standing Committee of the National People's Congress, which was subsequently approved by the Politburo and the Central Committee.

In April 1970, Lin unexpectedly wrote a letter to Mao, urging him to reconsider the decision on the grounds that being the leader of China, he should rightfully receive the full state honors. Mao rejected his suggestion and reiterated that the post was not of an interest to him. But Mao gave conflicting signals, at one point, proposed that Dong Biwu should take the post instead. According to biographer Roderick MacFarquhar, it was evidence that Mao was trying to trick Lin. However, biographer Philip Short argued that it was a common political tactic employed by Mao, with him putting his subordinates into a bind and seeing what choices they would make, with hopes that they would work out his thoughts on their own. However, Lin persisted three more times in the following months, which was further rejected by Mao. To Western biographers of Mao, Lin was simply trying to constitutionally secure his position within the state bureaucracy, but had been incorrectly construed by Mao as an attempt to kick him upstairs. Mao was also mistrustful of the political alliance made between Chen and Lin.

== Lushan Conference and Lin Biao's fall from power ==
On August 13, 1970, Wu Faxian, a member of the Constitution Drafting Group who had the backing of Lin and Chen, had a fierce verbal conflict with Cultural Revolution Group members Kang Sheng and Zhang Chunqiao over the inclusion of a reference of Mao being a "genius" in developing Marxism–Leninism with his theoretical contributions in the Constitution. Zhang initially opposed such veneration for Mao, but Wu persisted that they should not try to minimize Mao's role which evidently intimidated them, and the proposal was passed.

A week later, at the opening session of the Standing Committee of the Second Plenary Session of the 9th Central Committee of the Chinese Communist Party held in Lushan on August 22, Lin delivered the keynote speech where he brought up the "genius" reference and once again proposed restoring the presidency. It is still unknown whether Mao had approved the speech beforehand.

During the group discussion on August 23, Chen Boda and Wu Faxian attacked Zhang Chunqiao, accusing him of "taking advantage of Chairman Mao's great modesty on the "genius" reference to disparage Mao Zedong Thought as the nation's guiding ideology." Most of the Central Committee members, including Mao's chief bodyguard Wang Dongxing also joined in, criticizing Zhang Chunqiao for "opposing Chairman Mao." On August 24, Chen took it up a notch, drafting a bulletin which urged Mao to be the president with Lin as his deputy and attacked Zhang as a "swindler", a "power-hungry conspirator" and a "counterrevolutionary reactionary". Chen, being the fourth in the Party hierarchy, his accusations were grave.

On the morning of August 25, Mao met with the Cultural Revolution Group, which allegedly on one account, Jiang Qing had apparently convinced Mao that Lin and Chen were trying to "throw someone out" and that the attack on Zhang was apparently directed at Mao and his Revolution. To add to Mao's suspicion, delegates praised Chen's criticism of Zhang as "enhancing the understanding of Lin's keynote speech". To Mao, this was reminiscent of the power struggle that eclipsed the first Lushan Conference of 1959, whereby former Defense Minister Peng Dehuai had led the charge in attacking Mao's Great Leap Forward. Chen's attack had shown that many of the delegates were upset with Mao and his Cultural Revolution, and with half of the Central Committee from the military, Mao took no more chances.

That afternoon, after berating Wang for supporting the preposition, a meeting was called whereby Mao accused Chen of violating Party unity and shut down any further discussions. Just before the closing session a week later, Mao denounced Chen as a "political fraud who had launched a surprise attack that tried to blow the Conference to pieces with rumor-mongering instead of Marxist theory" and ordered his immediate arrest and detention at Qincheng Prison. A campaign was soon launched that denounced Chen as a "false Marxist". The purging of Chen left Lin politically unscathed, but the relationship between Mao and Lin began to deteriorate.

In the following months, Lin made no formal self-criticism likely out of political misjudgment, and self-criticism by his wife Ye Qun and his generals were deemed insincere and marginal by Mao. Mao inducted several of his own supporters to the Central Military Commission and placed loyalists in leadership roles in the Beijing Military District to dilute Lin's power.

By 1971, Lin had become extremely reclusive and his behavior became increasing erratic. At one point, he refused to attend the May Day celebrations at Tiananmen Square, and when he did show up at the urging of Premier Zhou Enlai, he arrived late contrary to protocol and was ignored by Mao, and left early as a result. Mao increasing felt that Lin was politically unreliable began to make plans to confront him politically.

In August 1971, Mao made a tour to Southern China to canvas support from military leaders. During the tour, Mao once again raised the issue again and for the first time ever, accused Lin as the main instigator of the events at Lushan. Mao claimed, "Some people are eager to become the state chairman, to split the party, and to seize power." Mao's accusation turned a normal discussion of the state system into a wider political power struggle. When the news reached Beidaihe, Lin Biao, who was recuperating there, was shocked. Lin's son Liguo, having received hints that Mao was determined to purge them, decided to launch an alleged coup d'état, in what is later to be known as Project 571, which eventually failed by the night of September 12.

== Aftermath ==
On September 13, Lin Biao escaped and died in a plane crash. When the CCP arranged the crime for Lin Biao, it officially defined "advocating the establishment of a state chairman" as the crime of the Lin Biao group. But when the CCP investigated the Lin Biao group case, it was difficult to start with the "genius theory" issue itself, as it was a symbol of Mao's personality cult. In order to prove that Lin Biao had tried to usurp the party and seized power, it cited the role of the "state chairman issue" at the Lushan Conference. The special investigation team induced Wu Faxian to confess that Ye Qun once said "If there is no state chairman, where will Lin Biao be placed?" as evidence of Lin Biao's usurpation of the party and power.

After the special investigation team received Ye Qun's statement from Wu Faxian, they were overjoyed. In 1973, the central government issued a number of documents on Lin Biao's traitorous party group, repeatedly mentioning Ye Qun's statement. Ye Qun's statement was also one of the "evidence" that Lin Biao's "great fleet" participated in the armed coup conspiracy . Cultural Revolution scholars Wang Nianyi and He Shu believe that the issue of the presidency involves the state system, and it is completely understandable that most Politburo members have a strong reaction to major issues involving national affairs. As for the proposal to change the state system such as abolishing the presidency, Mao Zedong should openly explain the reasons and reasons, but he has never given an explanation, and instead accused opponents of conspiracy.

However, Wu Faxian later said in his memoirs that this was perjury, and that this statement was actually made by Wang Dongxing and Cheng Shiqing, and had nothing to do with Ye Qun. Qiu Huizuo and Li Zuopeng also accused Wu Faxian of perjury in their memoirs. Given that this statement was untenable, the issue of the State Chairman did not appear in the final indictment. After the Lin Biao incident, the issue of the presidency was linked to the usurpation of power by the party, and no one dared to raise objections. In 1975, the Fourth National People's Congress was held and the new Constitution of the People's Republic of China was adopted, formally amending the Constitution to abolish the positions of the chairman and vice chairman.

The presidency was eventually restored in 1982.

== See also ==
- General Office of the President of the People's Republic of China
