= 1978 Constitution of China =

Former constitution

Constitution of the People's Republic of China

Overview
- Jurisdiction: China
- Ratified: 5 March 1978
- Author: National People's Congress
- Supersedes: 1975 Constitution of the People's Republic of China

Full text
- Constitution of the People's Republic of China (1978) at Wikisource

The 1978 Constitution of the People's Republic of China was a communist state constitution promulgated in 1978. This was the PRC's 3rd constitution, and was adopted at the 1st Meeting of the 5th National People's Congress on 5 March 1978, two years after the downfall of the Gang of Four.

== Content ==
The number of articles grew from the 1975 Constitution's 30 articles to double the amount. The courts and the procurates, which were minimized or dumped altogether in the 1975 Constitution of China, were somewhat restored. A greater degree of separation of the party from the state was also instituted, with the Premier regaining the right to nominate cabinet ministers and the National People's Congress no longer defined as an extension of the Chinese Communist Party. A number of checks and balances present in the 1954 Constitution, including term limits for party leaders, elections and more independence in the judiciary, were restored.

Regarding religion, the 1978 Constitution stated, "[C]itizens enjoy freedom to believe in religion and freedom not to believe in religion and to propagate atheism."

The 1978 Constitution was the first Constitution in the PRC to touch explicitly on the political status of Taiwan. It stated, "Taiwan is China's sacred territory. We are determined to liberate Taiwan and accomplish the great cause of reunifying the motherland."

Citizens' rights were also reinstated somewhat. The right to strike was still present, although it would be removed in the 1982 Constitution. However, the required support for the leadership of the Communist Party and the socialist system remained as part of citizens' duties. Nevertheless, the 1978 Constitution witnessed the first time since the 1950s that the document was considered authoritative enough for its provisions to merit the government's attention. For instance, after the Democracy Wall movement saw students using the constitutionally-guaranteed right to use big-character posters to criticize the government, the party responded by ordering a series of constitutional amendments which deleted this right in 1980. Previously, during the Tiananmen Square incident in 1976 when this same right had been invoked to criticize Mao Zedong and the Gang of Four, the government ordered the People's Liberation Army to suppress dissent without any effort to reconcile that action with the constitution.

Altogether, the Constitution still suffered from the backdrop of the just-gone-by Cultural Revolution. Revolutionary language was still persistent (such as "Revolutionary Committees"), although the slogans were gone. The 1978 Constitution survived for four years before being superseded by the current (1982) Constitution of China during the Deng Xiaoping era.

The 1978 Constitution officially included the Four Modernizations policy with an emphasis on socialist democracy, scientific and educational development. It also mandated in the preamble part that China must "be constructed into a great, powerful, modern socialist country in agriculture, industry, national defense, science and technology within the century".
