= 1975 Constitution of China =

Former constitution

Constitution of the People's Republic of China

Overview
- Jurisdiction: China
- Ratified: 17 January 1975
- Author: National People's Congress
- Supersedes: 1954 Constitution of China

Full text
- Constitution of the People's Republic of China (1975) at Wikisource

The 1975 Constitution of the People's Republic of China was a communist state constitution promulgated by the 4th National People's Congress. The offices of chairman and vice chairman were officially abolished under the constitution after almost seven years of functional non-existence since the purge of Liu Shaoqi.

== History ==
After the start of the Cultural Revolution in 1966, Liu Shaoqi, the state chairman appointed by the terms of the constitution, was imprisoned. After Liu Shaoqi was dismissed in 1968, the position of state chairman became vacant, and the original constitutional system fell to the wayside. In 1970, Mao Zedong proposed to abolish the position of state chairman, which was opposed by many leaders of the CCP, leaving the constitutional amendment deadlocked. In 1971, after the Lin Biao incident, the abolition of the state chairman became a foregone conclusion, and the work of constitutional amendment made some progress. On 17 January 1975, at the first session of the 4th National People's Congress, the second constitution was formally adopted, which abolished the positions of state chairman and vice chairman.

The 1975 constitution remained in effect for about three years due to the death of Mao Zedong and the rise of Hua Guofeng the following year, the latter of whom ordered its replacement with a new document to solidify his position as Mao's successor. It was thus the shortest-lived constitution in the history of the People's Republic of China.

== Content ==
This constitution reduced the total number of articles to just thirty, compared to 106 of articles in the 1954 Constitution of the People's Republic of China.

While the 1954 constitution had previously restricted any mention of Chinese Communist Party to preamble, the 1975 constitution was the first to include the leadership of the Chinese Communist Party in its main text and incorporated a large number of the institutions of the CCP into the system of state institutions. The constitution states that the People's Liberation Army, the armed services of the PRC, is to be controlled by the Chairman of the Chinese Communist Party and that the right to nominate the Premier of the State Council belongs to the Central Committee of the Communist Party. Such linkage between party and state would no longer be seen in later constitutions, particularly after 1982. The most significant link, however, came in Article 2, which stated that the Chinese Communist Party was the leading force of the Chinese people.

Mao Zedong Thought was also written into the main text of the constitution. The constitution abolished the electoral system, changed the people's congress system from direct election by the people for the lowest level people's congresses and indirect election by the lower level people's congresses, and instead implemented an opaque "democratic consultation" system.
