= 1954 Constitution of China =

Former constitution

Constitution of the People's Republic of China

Overview
- Jurisdiction: China
- Ratified: 20 September 1954
- System: Unitary communist state
- Head of state: Chairman of the People's Republic of China
- Chambers: Unicameral (National People's Congress)
- Repealed: 17 January 1975

Full text
- Constitution of the People's Republic of China (1954) at Wikisource

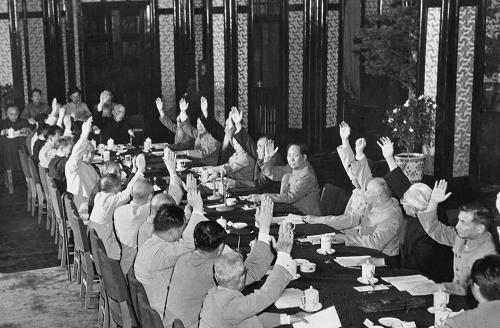
The Central People's Government Committee adopted the Draft of the Constitution of the People's Republic of China on 14 June 1954.

The 1954 Constitution of the People's Republic of China was a communist state constitution and seventh Chinese constitution adopted and enacted on 20 September 1954, through the first session of the 1st National People's Congress in Beijing. This constitution was amended and formulated on the basis of the Common Program of the Chinese People's Political Consultative Conference, which served as a provisional constitution in 1949, and is the first constitution of the People's Republic of China. The Constitution of the People's Republic of China is the fundamental law of the People's Republic of China and has the highest legal effect.

== Background ==
=== Common Program ===
After the founding of the People's Republic of China in 1949, the Common Program effectively served as the new country's "provisional constitution," The political system stipulated in the Common Program was a united front government with the participation of people from all classes and sectors, which was inconsistent with the Chinese Communist Party (CCP)'s goal of establishing what it termed a "people's democratic dictatorship" led by the working class and based on a worker-peasant alliance. In terms of economy, the Common Program stipulated a state-owned economy, a cooperative economy, a private economy, and an economy of cooperation between state and private capital. It also stipulated land reform in rural areas and the implementation of the "land to the tiller" policy. By 1953, land reform in rural China had been completed.

Liu Shaoqi said: "In the history of modern China, people have long debated a fundamental question - what is the way out for China? Is it capitalism or socialism? The tremendous changes that have taken place in the country in the past five years have provided a vivid answer to this question, and at the same time fully proved that the transition from the current complex economic structure to a single socialist structure, that is, from the current new democratic society to a socialist society, is the only correct path that our country should take. If we continue to maintain the status quo, China may become capitalist. He said that perhaps some people want to take the path of maintaining the status quo, that is, neither the capitalist path nor the socialist path, and maintain the current situation. Some people hope to preserve this state forever and it is best not to change it. They say that with the Common Program, why do we need a constitution? It is impossible for the two opposite relations of production, socialism and capitalism, to develop in parallel without interfering with each other in a country. If it does not become a socialist country, it will become a capitalist country. It is absolutely impossible for it not to change. Our country is determined to take the socialist path. To take the socialist path, we need to have a legal form to define the general tasks of our country's transition period."

=== Joseph Stalin's suggestion ===
Soviet leader Joseph Stalin first suggested drafting a constitution on the eve of the founding of the People's Republic of China. From June to August 1949, Liu Shaoqi secretly visited the Soviet Union. During the talks, Stalin discussed the constitutional issue and suggested that China could temporarily use the Common Program, but should prepare to draft a constitution. Stalin's second suggestion to draft a constitution came in early 1950 when CCP chairman Mao Zedong made his first visit to the Soviet Union. Stalin made three suggestions on China's construction, the second of which was to convene a National People's Congress (NPC) and draft a constitution.

Stalin's third suggestion to draft a constitution was in October 1952, when Liu Shaoqi led the CCP delegation to the 19th Congress of the Communist Party of the Soviet Union. Entrusted by Mao Zedong, he wrote a long letter to Stalin seeking his opinion on China's transition to socialism. Stalin agreed with the CCP's idea of transitioning to socialism, but disagreed with the opinion of not drafting a constitution for the time being, and suggested that the constitution be drafted ahead of schedule. He said that in order to refute the attacks on the new China by hostile forces in the international arena and to facilitate China's better development, China should bring forward the time for convening the NPC and drafting a constitution. He suggested that elections be held and the constitution be adopted in 1954.

In the context of the international situation at the time, Stalin was worried about the coalition government adopted by China in accordance with the Common Program. His real intention in being eager for China to convene the NPC and formulate a constitution as soon as possible was to have the Chinese government establish a one-party system through the constitution as soon as possible, that is, to quickly transform into the Soviet political system in order to expand the socialist camp.

== History ==
=== Preparation ===
On 1 December 1952, the Central Committee of the Chinese Communist Party issued a "Notice on Convening the National Congress of the Party," stating that the conditions for convening the National People's Congress and drafting a constitution had been met, and preparations were underway for constitutional legislation . On 24 December 1952, at the 43rd meeting of the Standing Committee of the 1st National Committee of the Chinese People's Political Consultative Conference, Zhou Enlai, on behalf of the CCP, proposed drafting a constitution; the CPPCC adopted this proposal.

On 1 January 1953, the People's Daily, the official newspaper of the CCP Central Committee, listed the drafting of the Constitution as one of the three tasks for 1953. In order to win the support of the democratic parties and all sectors of society for the CCP's drafting of the Constitution, Mao Zedong convened a symposium with 18 leaders of the democratic parties on 11 January, and Zhou Enlai convened a symposium of the CPPCC on January 12. At these two meetings, opinions on the drafting of the Constitution were heard from the democratic parties and people from all walks of life. At the symposium, some leaders of the democratic parties and democratic figures raised some questions and expressed concerns about the Central Committee's eagerness to draft a constitution.

On 13 January 1953, the 20th meeting of the Central People's Government Council decided to form a Constitution Drafting Committee, led by Mao Zedong and consisting of more than 30 people, thus formally establishing the Central People's Government as the constitution-drafting body. At the end of 1953, Mao Zedong led the Constitution Drafting Group to the West Lake State Guesthouse.

About 150 million people participated in the discussion of the first constitution, and more than 1.38 million opinions were put forward. In addition, more than 5.96 million representatives of the people's congresses of provinces, cities and counties also expressed their opinions. Based on the opinions solicited, the Constitution Drafting Committee revised the original draft and submitted it to the Central People's Government Committee for discussion and approval at an extraordinary meeting, thus forming the draft constitution for review.

On 15 January 1954, Mao Zedong sent a telegram to Liu Shaoqi and other central leaders, listing ten types of Chinese and foreign constitutions and requesting members of the Politburo and the Central Committee members in Beijing to take time to read them.

1. The 1936 Soviet Constitution and Stalin's Report;
2. The 1918 Constitution of Soviet Russia;
3. The Constitutions of Eastern European socialist countries such as Romania, Poland, East Germany, and Czechoslovakia
4. The Draft Constitution of the Republic of China in 1913
5. The Constitution of the Republic of China, 1923
6. The Constitution of the Republic of China, 1946
7. The French Constitution of 1946

=== Constitutional Drafting Committee ===
The 20th meeting of the Central People's Government Council on 13 January 1953 adopted:

- Chairman: Mao Zedong
- Committee members (32 people, listed in order of surname stroke count): Zhu De, Soong Ching- ling, Li Jishen, Li Weihan, He Xiangning, Shen Junru, Shen Yanbing, Zhou Enlai, Lin Boqu, Lin Feng, Hu Qiaomu, Gao Gang, Ulanhu, Ma Yinchu, Ma Xulun, Chen Yun, Chen Shutong, Chen Jiageng, Chen Boda, Zhang Lan, Guo Moruo, Xi Zhongxun, Huang Yanpei, Peng Dehuai, Cheng Qian, Dong Biwu, Liu Shaoqi, Deng Xiaoping, Deng Zihui, Saifuddin, Bo Yibo, Rao Shushi
- Secretariat (Adopted at the first plenary meeting of the Constitution Drafting Committee on March 23, 1954)
  - Secretary-General: Li Weihan (concurrently)
  - Deputy Secretaries-General: Qi Yanming, Tian Jiaying, Qu Wu, Hu Yuzhi, Sun Qimeng, Xu Guangping, Xin Zhichao

In January 1954, the Central Committee of the Chinese Communist Party decided to establish a Constitution Drafting Group to be responsible for drafting the initial draft:

- Members of the Constitution Drafting Group: Mao Zedong, Chen Boda, Hu Qiaomu, Tian Jiaying

In March 1954, the Political Bureau of the CCP Central Committee decided to establish a Constitutional Committee to revise the initial draft.

- Members of the Constitutional Committee: Chen Boda, Hu Qiaomu, Dong Biwu, Peng Zhen, Deng Xiaoping, Li Weihan, Zhang Jichun, Tian Jiaying

=== Adoption ===
On 20 September 1954, at the first session of the 1st National People's Congress, the delegates cast a total of 1,197 votes, with 1,197 votes in favor, and the Constitution of the People's Republic of China was adopted unanimously.

== Content ==
The May Fourth Constitution consisted of 106 articles, including the preamble, general principles, state institutions, basic rights and obligations of citizens, national flag, national emblem, and capital.

The preface first records the achievements of the Chinese people's revolutionary struggle, and then affirms the general line of the transition period for building socialism in the country and the internal and external conditions for realizing the general line. It declared that the CCP was the leader of the front and credited it specifically with ending a "century of heroic struggle" against "imperialism, feudalism, and bureaucrat capitalism." Under this situation, China finally became a one-party state under the uncontested control of the CCP.

The first chapter in the Constitution of 1954 includes 20 articles and it deals with the general issue of defining social and economic structure. The first chapter, gave the primary definition of "the nature of regime, the structure of ownership, people's property rights and so on."

The second chapter consists of 64 articles; this part stipulates the relationship between "the national people's congress (NPC), Chairman of China, State Council, and the local people's congress, the local people's councils" with "the Organs of self-government of National Autonomous Areas, the people's courts and the people's Procuratorates". The nature of the state was defined as a socialist state under what the CCP termed a "people's democratic dictatorship" based on an alliance of workers and peasants.

The third chapter indicates rights and duties of the country's citizen. It guarantees the equality of each citizen and it prohibits racial discrimination and oppression. This chapter consists of 19 articles and it protects a citizen's customs, habits and religious beliefs. The Constitution stipulates the basic rights and obligations of citizens and provides for measures to gradually expand material security. These provisions mainly include: citizens' right to equality under the law; the right to vote and to be elected; freedom of speech, publication, assembly, association, procession, demonstration, and other political freedoms, as well as freedom of religious activity; personal freedom and inviolability of residence; protection of the privacy of communications; freedom of residence and movement; the right to work and rest, and the right to material assistance; the right to education and freedom to conduct scientific research, artistic creation, and cultural activities; gender equality, protection of marriage and family, and protection of mothers and children; and the right to appeal and accuse state officials who violate the law and to obtain material compensation. It also stipulates that citizens have the sacred duty to abide by the law, protect public property, pay taxes according to law, defend the country, and perform military service.

The last chapter, which is the fourth chapter, stipulates the national flag, the national emblem and the capital of PRC. It defines "the national flag of People's Republic of China is a red flag with 5 stars" (Article 104); "the national emblem of the People's Republic of China is: in the center, Tien An Men under the light of five stars, and encircled by ears of grain and a cogwheel." (Article 105); and "the capital of People's Republic of China is Peking [Beijing]." (Article 106).

The constitution discussed foreign relations, stating that China would promote diplomatic relations with all countries as part of an effort to "strive for the noble cause of world peace and the progress of humanity." It stated that China would have "an indestructible friendship with the Soviet Union and the people's democracies."

== Aftermath ==
On the eve of the Cultural Revolution, Liu Shaoqi, then the Chairman of the People's Republic of China, fell victim to the Red Guards. Although constitutionally Liu could only be removed by the National People's Congress, since the force of the dawning Cultural Revolution was too great, the Communist Party hierarchy intervened and expelled Liu from office. The 1954 Constitution was replaced in the midst of the Cultural Revolution by the 1975 Constitution. Books published in the PRC since the 1980s regarded it and the 1978 Constitution with "serious errors". In the 1954 Constitution, the Chairman (now translated as president) could convene Supreme State Conferences—emergency meetings. This Presidential right was never seen again in later promulgations of the Chinese constitution.
