= 1st National Committee of the Chinese People's Political Consultative Conference =

First meeting of the top political advisory body of the People's Republic of China

1st National Committee of the Chinese People's Political Consultative Conference 中国人民政治协商会议第一届全国委员会
- Emblem of the Chinese People's Political Consultative Conference

9 October 1949 – 29 December 1954 Overview
- Type: Advisory body Legislature

Leadership
- Chairman: Mao Zedong
- Vice Chairmen: Zhou Enlai, Li Jishen, Shen Junru, Guo Moruo, Chen Shutong
- Secretary-General: Li Weihan
- Standing Committee: 28

Members
- Total: 198 members

The 1st National Committee of the Chinese People's Political Consultative Conference was the first meeting of the top political advisory body of the People's Republic of China. It convened in Beijing on 9 October 1949 and ended on 21 December 1954. During this period, it exercised legislative powers on the behalf of the National People's Congress, which was not yet established.

== Process ==
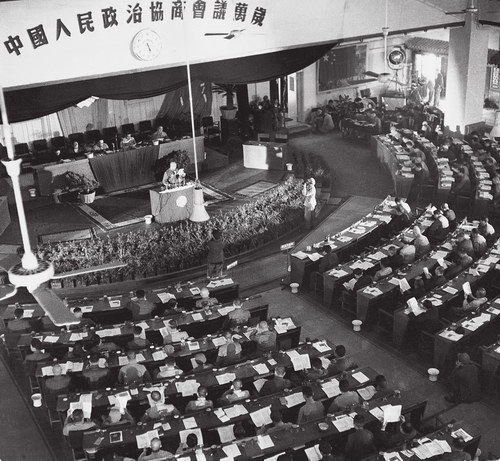
1st conference of the Chinese People's Political Consultative Conference in 1949

Members of the 1st National Committee were elected by the first plenary session of the Chinese People's Political Consultative Conference in September 1949.

On 21 September 1949, the First National Committee of the Chinese People's Political Consultative Conference (CPPCC) was convened, and its term lasted until the opening of the First Session of the Second National Committee on 21 December 1954. During this period, it adopted the Organic Law of the Chinese People’s Political Consultative Conference and the Organic Law of the Central People’s Government of the People’s Republic of China. It elected the Chairman, Vice Chairmen, and members of the Central People's Government Council, thereby forming the Central People's Government Committee and formally proclaiming the establishment of the People's Republic of China. The committee also adopted resolutions on the national capital, the calendar era, the national anthem, and the national flag, and approved the Common Program of the Chinese People's Political Consultative Conference. In addition, it adopted the Rules of Procedure of the Chinese People's Political Consultative Conference, established the National Committee and its various working bodies, and determined their respective memberships.

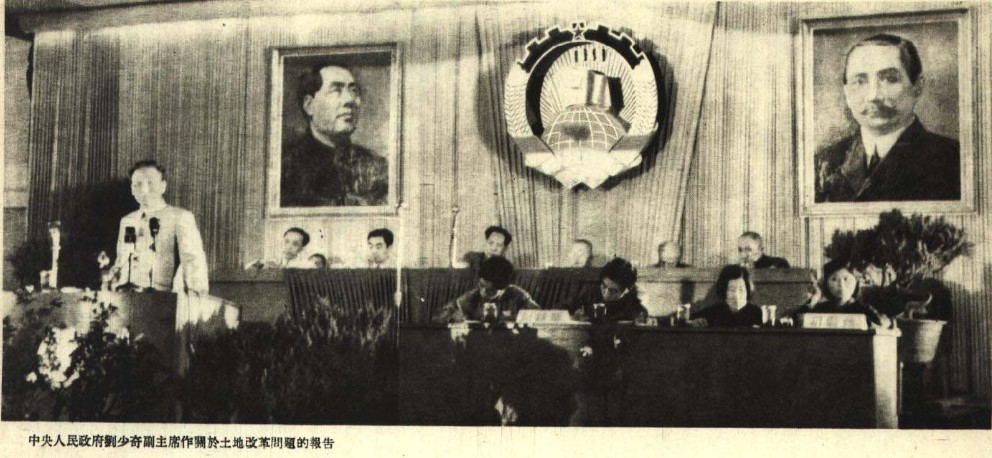
In 1950, Liu Shaoqi delivered a report on the Land Reform Law at the First Session of the National Committee of the Chinese People’s Political Consultative Conference.

Furthermore, the National Committee formulated and deliberated a number of important laws and draft regulations, including the Regulations on the Organization of the People’s Courts (Draft), the Marriage Law of the People’s Republic of China, the Interim Regulations on Chinese Trade Unions (Draft), and the General Principles for the Organization of Peasant Associations (Draft). It also mobilized the entire population to participate in major political movements, including the War to Resist U.S. Aggression and Aid Korea, Land Reform Movement, and the Campaign to Suppress Counterrevolutionaries, as well as the Three-anti and Five-anti Campaigns. In addition, it adopted resolutions on convening the National People's Congress and local people's congresses at various levels, laying an institutional foundation for the development of the state political system.

== Sessions ==
=== The first session ===
The 1st Session of the 1st CPPCC National Committee was held on 9 October 1949. It elected Mao Zedong as the CPPCC Chairman. It also elected Zhou Enlai, Li Jishen, Shen Junru, Guo Moruo and Chen Shutong as CPPCC vice chairpersons, Li Weihan as the secretary-general, and standing committee members. October 1 was designated as the National Day.

=== The second session ===
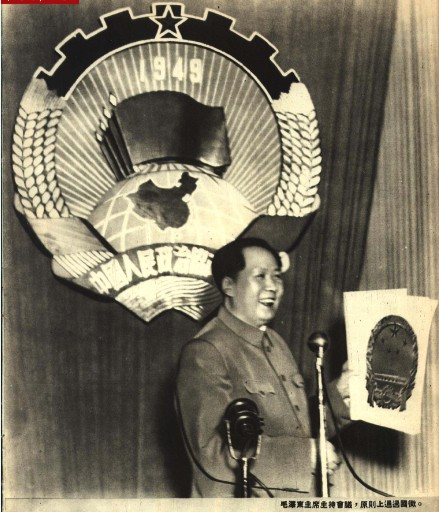
Mao Zedong presenting the newly adopted national emblem at the 2nd Session in 1950.

The 2nd Session was held on June 14–23, 1950. The Session approved the Land Reform Law of the PRC. It also designated July 1–7 as the "Peace Signature Movement Week", adopted a decision concerning local CPPCC committees, and adopted the National Emblem.

The meeting unanimously approved the work reports delivered respectively by Liu Shaoqi, Zhou Enlai, Chen Yun, Bo Yibo, Guo Moruo, Nie Rongzhen, and Shen Junru, which covered land reform, political affairs, economic and fiscal matters, taxation, culture and education, military affairs, and judicial work.

=== The third session ===
The third session was held from October 23 to November 1, 1951. Twenty volunteer army war heroes were invited to attend the meeting. Chairman Mao Zedong delivered the opening speech, calling for continued support of the “Resist America, Aid Korea” effort. Premier Zhou Enlai of the Central People's Government Council presented the political report. The meeting adopted resolutions on “Work Related to Resisting America and Aiding Korea,” “Reports on the Work of the Central People's Government,” and “Requests to Support the Signing of the Five Major Peace Treaties,” among others. It was also decided to produce commemorative medals for the “Resist America, Aid Korea” campaign, which were awarded to participants, totaling more than 2.5 million medals.

=== The fourth session ===
The 4th Session was held from February 4 to February 7, 1953. Mao Zedong delivered a speech at the meeting, while Vice Chairman Zhou Enlai presented the political report, Vice Chairman Chen Shutong reported on the work of the Standing Committee, and Vice Chairman Guo Moruo delivered a report titled “On the Proceedings and Achievements of the World Peace Conference.” The meeting adopted resolutions based on these reports.

An Ziwen, Minister of the Organization Department of the Chinese Communist Party, gave a speech titled “We Must Carry Out a Resolute Struggle Against Bureaucratism, Commandism, and Violations of Laws and Discipline Nationwide and in All Levels of Government Organs.” The meeting also elected twenty-three additional members to the Standing Committee, including Lin Boqu, Deng Xiaoping, Hu Qiaomu, Zhang Zhizhong, Luo Longji, Shi Fuliang, Ma Yinchu, Xu Guangping, Huang Qixiang, Xu Deheng, Chen Qiyou, Jiang Nanxiang, Liu Changsheng, Shi Liang, Li Siguang, Qian Sanqiang, Sheng Pihua, Li Dequan, Bao Erhan, Sanggyai Yexe, Liao Chengzhi, Wu Yaozong, and Xiong Kewu as members of the Standing Committee.

== Afterwards ==
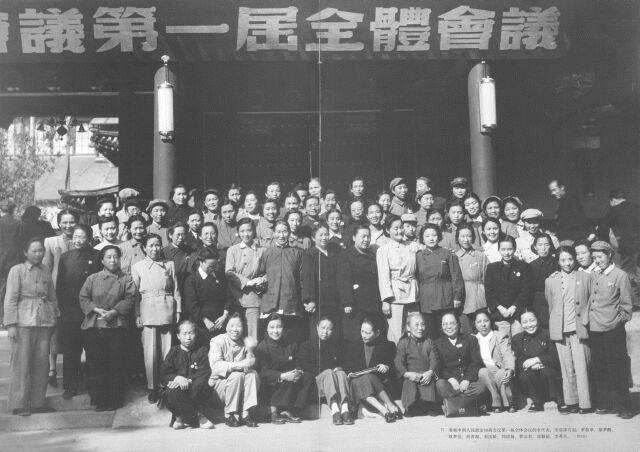
Women delegates who participated in the First Plenary Session of the Chinese People’s Political Consultative Conference

Subsequently, in September 1954, following the convening of the First Session of the 1st National People's Congress, the Chinese People's Political Consultative Conference (CPPCC) ceased to exercise the powers of the National People's Congress but continued to exist as a united front organization. Starting from the First Session of the Second National Committee of the CPPCC in December 1954, regional and military representatives were no longer considered constituent units of the CPPCC; instead, major national affairs were discussed under the names of various democratic parties and people’s organizations.

== See also ==
- 1st National People's Congress
- United front (China)

Preceded by Institution established	National Committee of the Chinese People's Political Consultative Conference; 1949 - 1954	Succeeded by 2nd CPPCC
