= Hunan delegation to the National People's Congress =

Hunan Delegation to the National People's Congress
- 全国人民代表大会湖南省代表团
- Delegation for the National People's Congress
- Map showing the location of Hunan Province
- Electoral unit: Hunan Province
- Population: 66,444,864

Current Delegation
- Created: 1954
- Seats: 118
- Head of delegation: Zhang Qingwei
- Provincial People's Congress: Hunan Provincial People's Congress

The Hunan delegation to the National People's Congress is a delegation composed of deputies representing Hunan Province within the National People's Congress (NPC), the supreme organ of state power of the People's Republic of China. NPC deputies from the Hunan Province are officially elected by the Hunan Provincial People's Congress.

== List of deputies ==
Year	NPC sessions	Deputies	Number of deputies	Ref.
1954	1st	Wang Jifan, Wang Fuhai, Shi Bangzhi, Xiang De, Zhu Zaoguan, Wu Tongxing, Lü Ji, Li Chenggui, Li Minghao, Li Zhen, Li Zheren, Li Weihan, Li Tao, Shen Qizhen, Di Chaobai, Yan Renhai, Zhou Libo, Zhou Gucheng, Zhou Zhenlin, Zhou Li, Yi Lirong, Lin Boqu, Shuai Mengqi, Tang Shengzhi, Xu Teli, Kang Juying, Cao Mengjun, Zhang Shizhao, Fu Dingyi, Tao Dayou, Zeng Zhaolun, Zeng Xianzhi, Cheng Qian, Shu Xincheng, He Guiyan, Yang Ding'an, Dong Chun, Lei Tianjue, Zhao Zixian, Qi Baishi, Liu Fei, Ouyang Yuqian, Jian Bozan, Cai Chang, Xiao San, Xie Jin, Kuang Jingrong, Luo Shuzhang, Tan Yubao, Tan Tiwu: By-election on July 16, 1955: Yi Xiangsu; By-election on June 15, 1956: Wu Huanyu, Ye Cailin; By-election on June 29, 1957: Cao Bowen		
1959	2nd	Wang Jifan, Wang Xinyuan, Shi Bangzhi, Long Laobao, Shuai Mengqi (female), Bai Yang (female), Liu Zhenliang, Liu Fei, Xiang Hongliang, Shen Qizhen, Shen Dejian, Yan Renhai, Li Minghao, Li Zhen (female), Li Fuchun, Li Weihan, Wu Tongxing, Wu Daosheng, Lü Ji, He Changgong, Lin Boqu, Zhang Wanhong, Zhang Qilong, Yi Lirong, Yi Xiangsu (female), Luo Shuzhang (female), Zhou Libo, Zhou Shizhao, Zhou Li, Zhou Gucheng, Zhou Zhenlin, Zhao Zixian, Ling Xiaxin, Gao Wenhua, Tang Shengzhi, Xu Teli, Zhang Shizhao, Kang Juying (female), Cao Bowen, Cao Mengjun (female), Xiao San, Tao Dayou, Peng Zugui, He Guiyan, Cheng Qian, Yang Ding'an, Jian Bozan, Cai Chang (female), Tan Yubao		
1964	3rd	Ma Songsheng, Wen Xinzheng, Wang Huabin, Wang Dinghuan, Wang Jifan, Wang Xiaoqing, Wang Xinyuan, Wang Huaisan, Shi Bangzhi, Long Haisheng, Long Yueqian, Lu Huilin, Shuai Mengqi, Ye Xiangyun, Tian Qifa, Tian Qizhan, Bai Fangmiao, Bai Yang, Pi Sanxiu, Liu Danian, Liu Changgeng, Liu Yongchu, Liu Zhenliang, Liu Zhongrong, Liu Yilun, Liu Kun, Liu Fei, Xu Xing, Cheng Xiyong, Lü Ji, Zhu Duanshou, Ren Banghuai, Hua Guofeng, Shen Qizhen, Shen Zuxian, Shen Dejian, Yan Renhai, Su Youquan, Li Zhen, Li Jinshen, Li Dunyi, Li Fuchun, Li Congfu, Yang Benlian, Yang Dingan, Wu Wende, Wu Shuji, Wu Yu, Wu Tongxing, Wu Daosheng, Yu Fu Xing, Qiu Chuangcheng, Zhang Wanhong, Zhang Yuzhen, Zhang Qiaoxun, Zhang Delong, Chen Shiheng, Chen Zhengping, Chen Nengkuan, Chen Meisheng, Guan Jianping, Zheng Zaixiao, Lin Xiaozhou, Ouyang Hengwen, Yi Lirong, Yi Xiangsu, Luo Zongxian, Luo Shuzhang, Luo Diekai, Zhou Libo, Zhou Li, Zhou Shizhao, Zhou Mai, Zhou Ruhang, Zhou Xingjian, Zhou Gucheng, Qu Shaoyuan, Jiang Guoren, Zhao Fangmin, Zhao Zixian, Zhao Qi, Liu Tongren, Rao Xing, Ling Xiaxin, Gao Wenhua, Guo Jian, Tang Shengzhi, Qin Hualong, Yuan Hegao, Nie Bingfa, Gui Mingjing, Gu Ji, Chai Cailin, Xu Qiwen, Xu Jihan, Xu Teli, Tao Dayou, Zhang Shizhao, Zhang Bosen, Kang JuyingXiao Youming, Xiao Yujun, Cao Bowen, Cao Guozhi, Cao Mengjun, Zeng Yansong, Xie Guofan, Peng Zugui, Huang Yucheng, Yu Jie, Cheng Qian, Liao Chunshan, Tan Yubao, Tan Ailan, Cai Chang, Jian Bozan, Jian Xianfo		
1975	4th	Yu Mingtao, Wang Fangshou, Wang Kunhe, Wang Haiyun, Mao Diqiu, Fang Zhongyu, Deng Zhengfan, Zuo Maochao, Ye Weidong, Ren Changsheng, Hua Guofeng, Xiang Wangqi, Liu Tianbao, Liu Fusheng, Liu Zuoren, Liu Xixiang, Liu Liangzhi, Liu Zhongfu, Jiang Caixiang, Xu Xinbao, Sun Zishu, Sun Defu, Li Xiaojia, Li Zhiyou, Li Guangqing, Li Xiuyun, Li Guobing, Li Shun, Li Shuan, Yang Fajiao, Yang Laoying, Xiao Lixia, Xiao Yuansu, Wu Changyun, Wu Hui, He Mingqing, Yan Renhai, Zhang Wanhong, Zhang Pinghua, Zhang Chuanjin, Zhang Hua, Zhang Guo Qing, Zhang Fucai, Chen Liaohai, Chen Qizhi, Chen Guoda, Chen Guochu, Chen Huilan, Yi Huicai, Yi Shuyuan, Luo Diekai, Jin Shijun, Zhou Shizhao, Zhou Li, Zhou Yuannan, Zhou Nansheng, Zhou Mingyi, Zheng Hong, Qu Zhifu, Zhao Qi, Ling Xiaxin, Guo Luqun, Tang Lijun, Tang Suping, Huang Zhongfan, Huang Zhongqin, Huang Jinlian, Huang Fuhe, Cao Xunde, Pan Daigan, Ma Laoer, Peng Wuren, Peng Guanshu, Peng Jia'e, Qin Huamei, Yu Yong, Jiao Peiwei, Shu Yugao, Zeng Fanxian, Xie Zhifeng, Lei Xiaohan, Zhan Xianli, Tan Yubao		
1978	5th	Ding Zhaodi, Ding Guoyou, Ma Benhui, Ma Yongkang, Wang Fangshou, Wang Jinlan, Wang Kunhe, Wang Dinghuan, Wang Haiyun, Mao Diqiu, Mao Zhiyong, Wen Xinzheng, Wen Yuxiang, Fang Zhongyu, Yin Mansheng, Sun Anmin, Deng Changming, Long Qingyou, Lu Huilin, Tian Qifa, Tian Zepu, Kuang Dingsheng, Bi Chengsong, Zhu Zhengchun, Zhu Guoqing, Ren Banghuai, Ren Chunguang, Liu Yanan, Liu Xingti, Liu Fangting, Liu Liansheng, Liu Xianglan, Qi Shouliang, Xu Daoqian, Sun Guozhi, Yan Yurong, Li Erxiu, Li Xiaojia, Li Guokang, Li Chunhua, Li Linzhuang, Li Shoucheng, Li Jinshen, Li Dunyi, Yang Yucui, Yang Fajiao, Yang Qinghua, Xiao Yuansu, Wu Yunchang, Wu Hui, Wu Qingzhi, Wu Daosheng, Kuang Peilan, Wang Hengpei, Zhang Wanhong, Zhang Qiaoxun, Zhang Xianyu, Zhang Hua, Zhang Guoqing, Zhang Fucai, Chen Yuming, Chen Qizhi, Chen Guoda, Chen Guochu, Chen Guozhong, Chen Yangu, Lin Xiangsheng, Yi Huicai, Luo Tingbao, Luo Diekai, Luo Chuntang, Luo Qiuyue, Zhou Dongsheng, Zhou Ruhang, Zhou Xingchang, Zhou Li, Zhou Guohe, Zhou Minghong, Zhou Duanchu, Zheng Zaixiao, Qu Zhifu, Zhao Fangmin, Zhao Buzhen, Zhao Qi, Hou Zhenting, Yao Yuanhe, Yuan Longping Ling Xiaxin, Tang Yugui, Tang Lijun, Tang Liqun, Tang Zehuai, Huang Jiduan, Huang Congquan, Huang Wenbin, Huang Zhongfan, Huang Zhongqin, Huang Fuhe, Huang Bingquan, Cao Hesun, Cui Jinming, Pan Daigan, Pan Meijin, Liang Yongtang, Peng Guanshu, Peng Shunnan, Dong Baoran, Qin Zhangming, Zeng Jiming, Zeng Zhuqin, You Hongtao, Xie Zerun, Cai Chang, Liao Xingchu, Tan Yubao, Tan Qingsong, Tan Ailan, Tan Zhenlin		
1983	6th	Ma Anjian, Ma Bi, Wang Xianmei, Wang Guozhi, Wang Guifang, Wang Huanming, Ge Hua, Wen Yuyi, Wen Xinzheng, Deng Guangju, Zuo Dudong, Long Sumei, Lu Huilin, Tian Zhongda, Lü Ji, Zhu Erzhen, Zhu Zheng, Zhu Lingu, Xiang Renzhong, Liu Danian, Liu Yunlian, Liu Zheng, Liu Shenggui, Liu Chunhui, Liu Xueyi, Liu Chunhua, Qi Shouliang, Xu Yuexian, Xu Daoqian, Sun Guozhi, Su Yuyuan, Li Xiaojia, Li Guangzhi, Li Linzhuang, Li Jinshen, Li Dunyi, Li Pu, Li Xiangcheng, Li Jingshan, Yang Yingxiu, Yang Zushu, Yang Minzhi, Yang Chaochang, Xiao Zehong, Wu Zhankui, Wu Yunchang, Wu Hui, Wu Tongxing, Qiu Xiaopei, Qiu Wuxing He Fuzhao, Zou Shengyang, Zou Xuening, Zhang Xiaoxian, Zhang Mingyao, Zhang Fucai, Zhang Deren, Lu Guanwei, Chen Guoda, Chen Bingzhi, Chen Zhi, Chen Ewen, Chen Zhangjia, Xing Maofa, Lin Yinghe, Yi Yang, Yi Zhengqiu, Luo Shuzhang, Luo Haifan, Zhou Shiyi, Zhou Congyu, Zhou Weihua, Zhou Bingzhao, Zheng Zaixiao, Zhao Chunwu, Hu Keshi, Hu Minggui, Hou Zhenting, Yao Benyan, Yao Mengxiang, He Lianghui, He Xiangchu, Geng Biao, Xia Guizhen, Gu Zhili, Xu Hong, Gao Ziman, Gao De, Tang Funan, Tang Ying, Tao Lian, Huang Jinrui, Mei Zhongxiu, Liang Weifu, Liang Zhiren, Peng Liuan, Peng Yuanchun, Peng Yanjiao, Jiang Liangjun, Cheng HongshengZeng Zhengxiang, Zeng Beiwei, Zeng Jianhui, Zeng Yanchun, Tan Donglan, Tan Haiyun, Tan Jingyang, Zhai Lipu, Pan Weichou, Xue Rui, Huo Xukui, Wei Quan		
1988	7th	Bu Qisheng, Wang Keying, Wang Lianfu, Wang Songda, Wang Xianyi, Wang Xianmi, Wang Guifang, Yuan Dongwu, Wen Yuyi, Fang Yutang, Yin Weiping, Deng Wenquan, Deng Weite, Ai Aiguo, Li Yining, Shi Yuzhen, Long Sumei, Tian Xiaoying, Qiu Wuxing, Sima Qiong, Zhu Erzhen, Zhu Huaian, Zhu Jinian, Zhu Delin, Liu Danian, Liu Fusheng, Liu Yuhua, Liu Kunshan, Liu Gangfu, Qi Shouliang, Qi Chengjing, Sun Zhenhua, Sun Jianzhong, Yan Dungan, Li Xiaojia, Li Luobin, Li Zehou, Li Xueyuan, Li Fugui, Li Peisheng, Li Shurong, Li Ruishan, Yang Zhengyuan, Yang Xiangqun, Yang Fangqun, Yang Kejian, Yang Yihong, Yang Manyu, Xiao Zehong Xiao Xinqiu, Xiao Duanlin, Wu Danren, Wu Tongnan, Wu Zhiquan, Wu Qi, He Zhenlin, He Xiang, Zou Shengyang, Song Kexiang, Zhang Guangyu, Zhang Ruo, Zhang Zhongpei, Zhang Deren, Zhang Deqi, Zhang Xia, Chen Guoda, Chen Zhongping, Chen Yan, Chen Zhi, Yi Dexing, Zhou Shichang, Zhou Jue, Zhou Bingzhao, Zheng Fangqi, Zhao Kerong, Zhao Jiebing, Zhao Shangjiu, Zhao Rong, Zhao Manzhen, Hu Biao, Duan Mingkang, Hou Zhenting, Yao Qiyun, Yuan Mouxun, Xu Zhongyu, Xu Tangling, Gao De, Tang Dacheng, Huang Zilian, Huang Yimin, Huang Daoqi, Huang Biwu, Peng Yuanxi, Peng Renjie, Dong Laiwei, Jiang Fujun, Jiang Chunyun, Jiang Qiansheng, Jiang Fuping, Cheng HongshengJiao Linyi, Zeng Jianhui, Zeng Xianzhe, Xie Kexi, Zhan Shunchu, Liao Chongzhen, Tan Zhixian, Tan Jinsheng, Tan Jingyang, Xiong Qingquan, Li Zize, Qu Baoyuan		
1993	8th	Wan Peiya, Yi Juying, Wang Songda, Wang Xianyi, Wang Xibing, Kong Lingzhi, Deng Wenquan, Deng Weite, Li Yining, Long Shouhong, Shen Jiaqiu, Cong Shuying, Zhu Pinfang, Zhu Chuyun, Zhu Rongji, Xiang Xiande, Liu Fusheng, Liu Yaochen, Liu Hongyun, Liu Dikai, Liu Jianwen, Liu Zuyi, Tang Shulan, Sun Jixiang, Sun Jianzhong, Yang Zhongshu, Yang Baohua, Li Renshan, Li Jing, Li Dehua, Yang Shiwei, Yang Exiang, Xiao Zhenglong, Xiao Duanlin, Wu Tongnan, Wu Zhiquan, Wu Yuansheng, Wu Qi, He Wenbin, He Zhenlin, He Xiang, Yu Xiaoliang, Zhang Mingtai, Zhang Xuedong, Zhang Shuhai, Zhang Jian, Chen Bangzhu, Chen Guangjian, Chen Shujun, Chen Guo Da, Lin Niu, Lin Yue, Ouyang Song, Luo Kuan, Zhou Xingrong, Zhou Yuping, Zhou Richard, Zhao Xiaoping, Zhao Beiying, Zhao Manzhen, Zhao Yizheng, Duan Yimei, Hou Zhenting, Yao Shouzhuo, Yao Qiyun, Yuan Xi, Jia Mingzhong, Xia Heping, Xia Jiajun, Gu Rongqi, Xu Tangling, Yin Wenzhong, Gao Jinping, Gao De, Guo Jianping, Tu Ping, Huang Yuanliang, Huang Xiude, Huang Zhongying, Huang Peijin, Cao Zhengxiang, Qi Heping, Sui Baohua, Zhang Chunxiang, Zhang Ruifu, Zhang Yanping, Liang Wengen, Peng Yuanxi, Peng Maowu, Dong Zhiwen, Jiang Tiesheng, Han Zhaoxi, Han Ji'an, Chu Bo, Zeng Jianhui, Zeng Xianze, Zeng Xiaohu, Zeng Weilun, Xie Gongji, Xie JifengLei Guozhang, Zhan Shunchu, Cai Lulun, Liao Lijun, Tan Xinghua, Tan Chengling, Xiong Qisheng, Xiong Qingquan, Teng Zhaorong, Yan Yongsheng, Pan Guiyu, Wei Huisheng		
1998	9th	Ding Song, Ma Ying, Wang Tingming, Wang Zhaohong, Wang Kangyuan, Wang Keying, Wang Songda, Wang Maolin, Wang Daosheng, Wang Xibing (Tujia), Mao Zeping, Kong Lingzhi, Deng Guoqiang, Deng Weite (Zhuang), Li Yining, Long Kai'e (Dong), Long Zhiping (Miao), Tian Dalun, Kuang Yanbo, Zhu Zhengfang, Zhu Jinlin (Tujia), Zhu Wan, Zhu Rongji, Ren Bingnan, Liu Yu'e, Liu Dongrong, Liu Yongshan, Liu Huansheng, Liu Siyuan, Liu Xueming, Liu Zhaoqian, Liu Meiqiu, Liu Xiao, Liu Xiangtao, Liu Xiangrong, Xu Yunzhao, Xu Bingtang, Sun Jusi, Sun Juliang, Du Yuanming, Li Youmei (Miao), Li Jienan, Li Bihui, Li Gangting, Li An, Li Zhihui, Li Songling, Li Mingju, Li Changshui, Li Shendian, Yang Zhengwu (Tujia) Yang Chongxi, Yang Minzhi, Wu Zhiquan, Wu Jiamei (Miao), Wu Zongyuan (Dong), Wu Zhenhan, He Weihong, He Shujin, Yu Kejian, Wang Hui, Zhang Yunchuan, Zhang Riping, Zhang Changping, Zhang Baohua, Zhang Jian, Chen Renshui, Chen Benzhong, Chen Shuhong, Chen Xiaofang, Chen Dequan, Chen Luxia, Wu Jihai (Miao), Wu Junyao, Luo Haifan, Luo Di'an, Zhou Hanxiang, Zhou Zhaoda, Zhou Bohua, Zhou Daojiong, Zhou Qunchu, Zheng Maoqing, Guan Chunyun (Mongolian), Zhao Xiaogang, Zhao Rong (Yao), Hu Zisheng, Zhong Mingzhi, Zhong Zhihua, Duan Youlin, Yao Zhengrong, Yuan Xi, Jia Yonghua, Xu Guowu, Xu Xianping, Ling Yu (Miao), Gao De, Tang Meiying, Huang PeijinHuang Qiongyao, Huang Xiangping, Cao Ya, Zhang Ruifu, Liang Wengen, Peng Xueming (Tujia ethnic group), Peng Jiajun (Tujia ethnic group), Dong Zhiwen, Jiang Yunyu, Jiang Jianguo, Cheng Lixin, Chu Bo, Zeng Qingyan, Zeng Jianhui, Zeng Xiaoping, Xie Ping, Xie Youqing, Xie Boyang, Xie Kangsheng, Cai Lifeng, Pan Guiyu, Dai Jufang		
2003	10th	Wang Rixin, Wang Yangjuan (female), Wang Xiaozhong, Wang Songda, Wang Maolin, Wang Xiang, Wang Tian, Wang Zhenxin, Wen Huiguo, Deng Zhonghua, Deng Jitian, Gan Lin (female), Ye Jun, Tian Dalun (female, Miao), Tian Rubin (Tujia), Kuang Meizai (female), Zhu Youwen, Zhu Xueqin (female), Zhu Wan (female), Ren Yuqi, Xiang Caiyin (female), Liu Yunzhu, Liu Pingjian, Liu Dongrong (female), Liu Chunping, Liu Zhenguo, Liu Xiao, Liu Xiaoying (female), Liu Aiping, Xu Ronghuai, Su Aiping (female), Li Xiaopeng, Li Kaixi, Li Youzhi, Li Youmei (female, Miao), Li Bihui (Tujia), Li Hua, Li An, Li Jianguo, Li Jianxin, Li Yingwu, Li Junxiang (Yao), Li Tieying, Li Changshui, Li Huanran, Li Ruishi, Li Jingan, Yang Zhengwu (Tujia), Yang Lan Zhi (female, Dong ethnicity), Yang Shaojun, Yang Xiaojia (female), Yang Xiang, Xiao Zijiang, Xiao Yayu, Wu Xiangdong, Wu Changxu, Wu Jinshui, Wu Zhenhan, Wu Jichuan, He Subin (female), Yu Kejian, Zhang Yunchuan, Zhang Yongzhong (Miao ethnicity), Zhang Pingying (female, Tujia ethnicity), Zhang Deming, Chen Zhiqiang (Miao ethnicity), Chen Junwen, Chen Shuhong, Chen Yanjing (female, Tujia ethnicity), Chen Mansheng, Wu Jihai (Miao ethnicity), Lin Wu, Luo Haifan, Luo Bisheng, Zhou Yuqing, Zhou Benshun, Zhou Zhaoda, Zhou Bohua, Zhao Long, Zhao Xiangping, Hu Youchun, Hu Zisheng, Zhong Faping, He Renyu, He Zhenglong, Xia Zanzhong, Xu Xianping, Ling Yu (Miao ethnicity), Tang Jiuhong (female), Tang Xiaoyun (female), Tang Lei, Tao Yishan, Huang Tianxi, Huang Zhian (female), Huang Peijin, Huang Qiongyao (female), Liang Youzi(Female), Liang Wengen, Peng Xueming (Tujia), Jiang Zuobin, Cheng Lixin (female), Fu Zhihuan, Shi Dayue, Lu Pingyi, Lu Libin (female), Zeng Xiaoshan, Zeng Xianbing, Xie Youqing, Xie Qingtao (female), Xie Chaoyue (female), Lu Ming, Zhan Chunxin, Cai Lifeng, Liao Ronghua, Tan Zhongchi, Miao Mancong (female), Teng Zhaoyi (Miao), Dai Jufang (female)		
2008	11th	Yu Laishan, Ma Yong, Wang Shiqi, Wang An'an (female), Wang Yangjuan (female), Wang Zhiying (female), Wang Tian, Wen Huiguo, Wen Huazhi (female), Gan Lin (female), Ye Wenzhi, Tian Rubin (Tujia), Dai Chaoxia (female), Zhu Xueqin (female), Wu Donglan (female), Ren Yuqi, Xiang Wenbo, Xiang Pinghua (Tujia), Liu Benzhi, Liu Pingjian, Liu Xiaowu, Liu Aiping, Liu Jie, Liu Qiwu, Liu Xianghao, Liu Xiang'e (female), Liu Tan'ai, Xu Zhongqiu, Xu Juyun, Yang Guoxiu (female), Li Yilong, Li Kaixi, Li Youzhi, Li Youmei (female, Miao), Li Qiaoyun (female), Li Hua, Li Jiang, Li Zhixuan, Li Jianxin, Li Shishi, Li Jian, Li Xianghong (Yao), Li Huanran, Li Weijian, Li Xi (female), Yang Zhengwu (Tujia), Yang Shaojun, Yang Li (female), Yang Xiaojia (female), Xiao Zijiang, Xiao Liqiong (female), Wu Yizhen (Miao), Wu Zhengyou (Miao), Wu Xiangdong, Wu Jianping (female), He Renchun, He Yuncai, Yu Aiguo, Zhang Pingying (female, Tujia), Zhang Fangping, Zhang Jianlin, Zhang Chunxian, Zhang Jianfei, Zhang Jianbo, Zhang Shuofu, Zhang Deming, Chen Daifu, Chen Guangzheng, Chen Xiaoqiong (female), Lin Wu, Zhuo Xinping (Tujia), Luo He'an, Luo Meiyuan (female), Luo Zuliang, Zhou Yuqing, Zhou Benshun, Zhou Zhaoda, Zhou Changgong, Zhou Qiang, Zheng Baiping, Zhao Xiaoming, Zhao Xiangping, Zhao Fudong, Hu Weiwu, Hu Guochu, Hu Jianwen, Zhong Faping, Zhong Yanmin, Jiang Yuquan, Jiang Shi, Zhu Xuejun (female), Yao Jiannian, Yao Yuanzhen (female, Tujia), He Guoqiang, He Keng, Qin Xiyan, Mo DewangXu Keqin (Miao), Xu Xianping, Guo Guangwen, Tang Jiuhong (female), Tang Jianqiang, Huang Lanxiang (female), Huang Zhiming, Qi Heping, Gong Wusheng, Gong Jiahe, Kang Weimin, Peng Aihua (female), Jiang Anrong, Fu Xihe (Miao), Shi Shenghui, Xie Zilong, Xie Yong, Xie Hui, Meng Lanfeng (female, Dong), Tan Yan (female), Yan Jiansheng		
2013	12th	Yu Laishan, Wang Li, Wang Xuedong, Wang Bin, Wang Tian, Wang Qun, Deng Sanlong, Long Feifeng (female, Yao ethnicity), Long Qiuhua, Lu Ping (female), Ye Wenzhi, Tian Rubin (Tujia ethnicity), Shi Yaobin, Sheng Hui, Zhu Guojun (Tujia ethnicity), Zhu Jianmin, Wu Donglan (female), Xiang Pinghua (Tujia ethnicity), Liu Zhengjun, Liu Pingjian, Liu Guozhong, Liu Dingjun, Liu Shaoying (female), Liu Xianghao, Liu Dehui, Liu Tan'ai, Qi Zhenwei, Xu Zhongqiu, Xu Juyun, Yang Guoxiu (female), Yang Zuyao, Li Xiaohong (female), Li Hua, Li Jiang, Li Jianxin, Li Shishi, Li Hui (female), Li Weijian, Li Xiangyue, Li Fuli, Yang Shaojun, Yang Li (female), Yang Juanjuan (female), Yang Shudi (female, Miao ethnicity), Xiao Anjiang, Wu Zhengyou (Miao ethnicity), Wu Shizhong, Wu Xiangdong, Wu Jinshui Wu Hao, He Binsheng, He Jihua, Shen Lüye (female, Miao), Zhang Ping, ~~Zhang Ziyin~~, Zhang Qing'e (female), Zhang Pingying (female, Tujia), Zhang Jianfei, Zhang Xiaoqing (female), Chen Wenhao, Chen Daifu, Chen Hao, Chen Zhaoxiong, Ouyang Changqiong, Ouyang Shanglian (female), Zhuo Xinping (Tujia), Yi Pengfei, Luo Shuangquan (female), Luo He'an, Luo Zuliang, Zhou Jianxiong, Zhou Haibing, Zhou Qiang, Zheng Yanguo, Qu Sheng (female), Zhao Yongping, Zhao Lisha (female), Hu Zijing, Hu Xuxi, Hu Zhongxiong, Hu Jianwen, Hu Henghua, Zhong Faping, Zhong Yanmin, Yao Yuanzhen (female, Tujia), Qin Xiyan, Xu Shousheng, Guo Jianqun (female, Miao), Huang Xiaoling (female), Huang Zhiming, Huang Boyun, Cao Huiquan, Gong Jianming, Gong Shuguang, Kang Weimin, Peng Guofu, Peng JianwuJiang Qiutao (female), Fu Lijuan (female), Lu Huzi, Lu Guiqing, You Quanrong, Xie Zilong, Xie Yong, Xie Chaoying, Xie Hui, Meng Lanfeng (female, Dong ethnic group), Lai Xiaomin, Lai Mingyong, Lei Dongzhu (female), Lu Jianping, Zhan Chunxin, Liao Renbin, Pan Guimei (female), Pan Runlan (female), Dai Hairong (female, Tujia ethnic group), Dai Birong (female), Wei Xuanjun (female), Qu Hai (Miao ethnic group)		
2018	13th	Ding Xiaobing, Wang Tian, Wang Shaofeng, Wang Qishan, Wang Huaijun (female, Tujia), Wen Aihua, Shi Jianhui, Long Xiaohua (female, Miao), Long Xianwen (Miao), Tian Hongqi (female), Sheng Hui, Cheng Xinxiang (female), Zhu Lifeng, Zhu Dengyun (female, Miao), Wu Xinbin (female), Xiang Chanjiang, Weiyi (Tujia ethnic group), Liu Jun, Liu Xiaoping, Liu Feixiang, Liu Zhiren, Liu Yanqing (female), Liu Shiqing, ~~Liu Hesheng~~, Liu Ge'an, Liu Lianyu (female), Liu Weichao, Liu Dehui, Jiang Tianliang (Tujia ethnic group), Xu Dazhe, Xu Zhongqiu,~~Yang Weiguo~~Yang Hailing (female), Du Meishuang (female), Du Jiahao, Li Xiaohong (female), Li Jiangnan, Li Jian'an, Li Jianxin, Yang Li (female), Yang Shangzhen (Dong ethnic group)~~Yang Yiwen~~Xiao Youxiang (female), Wu Jinshui, Wu Jifa, Wu Duanhua, Zou Bin, Zou Wenhui, Shen Changjian, Zhang Di, Zhang Lin (female), Zhang Zhuohua, Zhang Xuewu, Zhang Xiaoqing (female), Chen Jin, Chen Wenhao, Chen Xiangqun, Chen Yongbiao, Miao Zhenlin, Ouyang Shanglian (female), Zhuo Xinping (Tujia), Jin Jinyao, Zhou Min (female), Zhou Wendui, Zhou Linghui (female), Zhou Qinghe, Zhou Derui, Zheng Jianxin, Shan Xiaoming (female), Qu Sheng (female), Meng Qingqiang, ~~Zhao Yingyun~~, Hu Weilin, Hu Jianwen, Hu Chunhua, Hu Chunlian (female), Hu Meie (female, Miao), Hu Hebo, Zhong Yanmin, Yao Jinbo, Qin Yuefei, Qin Ailing (female, Miao), Yuan Youfang, Yuan Yanwen, Yuan Jianliang, Nie Pengju, Xu Yunbo, Xu Yuanbing, Guo Xiaoqin (female), Tang Yue, Tang Yongbo, Tang Chunyu (female, Yao), Huang He, Huang Xiaoling (female), Cao Zhiqiang, Cao Huiquan, Gong Shuguang, Tuo Qinhui (female, Tujia), Liang Wengen, Peng Qi (female), Peng Jimiao (Tujia), Dong Zhongyuan, Jiang Changzhong, Jiang Jianyu, Han Yongwen, Fu Kui, Tong Luwen (female, Tujia), You Quanrong, Xie Yong, Xie Ziqing (female), Yan Fuchu, Lei Dongzhu (female), Liao Renwang, Liao Xiaojun, Tan Zeyong (Miao), Tan Zuan, Li Zhihong, Dai Lizhong		
2023	14th	Wan Buyan, Wang Shuangquan, Wang Gang, Wang Xu, Wang Hongbin, Wang Ya, Wang Zhen, Mao Weiming, Wu Lan, Wen Xiaoyan, Yin Shuangfeng, Deng Hua, Gan Shenglian, Shi Jia, Shi Taifeng, Long Rong, Long Xianwen, Ye Xiaoying, Tian Jiqun, Yin Yulong, Ning Fenfang, Sheng Hui, Cheng Xinxiang, Zhu Yu, Zhu Jian, Hua Xuejian, Liu Yixin, Liu Feixiang, Liu Zhengmao, Liu Lingli, Liu Junchen, Liu Lianyu, Liu Tao, Jiang Tianliang, Jiang Fan, Yang Yueqiu, Du Jiahao, Li Xiaohong, Li Xiaosong, Li Donglin, Li Jiancheng, Li Jianyu, Li Zhi, Yang Jinjun, Yang Tao, Yang Li, Yang Weigang, Xiao Beigeng, Wu Yiqiang, Wu Jiejun, Wu Jifa, [ [ He Wei|]] Zou Bin, Shen Changjian, Shen Xiaoming, Song Zheng, [[Zhang Qingwei|]], Zhang Xuewu, Zhang Di, Zhang Fusuo, Chen Hua, Chen Huiqing, Chen Yongbiao, Chen Ailin, Chen Jing, Chen Menglin, Ou Yunfei, Luo Yijun, Zhou Changyou, Zhou Zhenyu, Zhou Haibing, Zhou Hong, Zhou Chao, Zheng Yongguang, Zheng Shenggang, Shan Xiaoming, Meng Qingqiang, Zhao Chunmei, Hu Xusheng, Hu Guozhu, Hu Chunlian, Hu Meie, Hu Hebo, Zhong Yanmin, Hong Tianyun, Yao Jinbo, Nie Pengju, Chai Fangguo, Yin Cuiping, Gao Ya, Tang Yue, Hai Shui, Huang Xiaoling, Huang Shuibo, Huang Le, Gong Zhengwen, Fu Guoqiang, Ma Xiaojuan, Peng Xiaoyan, Jiang Difeng, Jiang Chaoyang, Yu ZiwenCheng Wei, Cheng Bei, Jiao Qisen, Zeng Lianying, Zeng Chaoqun, Xie Zilong, Bao Bin, Xian Tieke, Kan Baoyong, Li Chunqiu, Yan Tao, Dai Lizhong, Dai Yin, Ji Tao	118	
