= Wang Juqian =

Chinese bridge engineer and politician

- 汪菊潜
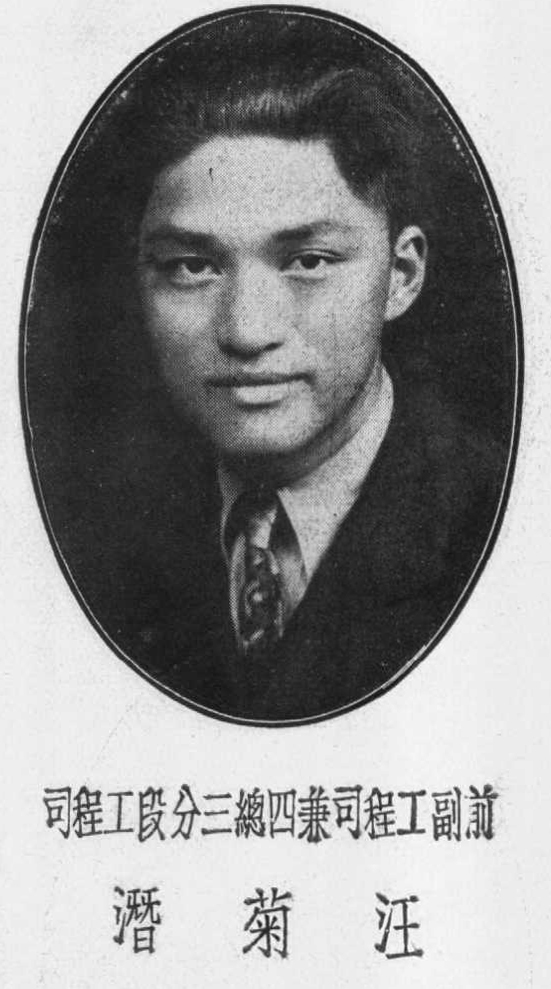

Vice Minister of Railways
- In office 1959–1975
- Minister: Teng Daiyuan; Lü Zhengcao; Wan Li

Personal details
- Born: 29 December 1906 Shanghai, Qing China
- Died: 27 February 1975 (aged 68) Beijing, China
- Party: Chinese Communist Party
- Education: Tangshan Jiaotong University; Cornell University
- Scientific career
- Fields: Railway Bridge Engineering
- Workplaces: Ministry of Railways

Chinese name
- Simplified Chinese: 汪菊潜
- Traditional Chinese: 汪菊潛
Transcriptions
Standard Mandarin
- Hanyu Pinyin: Wāng Júqián

Wang Juqian (29 December 1906 – 27 February 1975) was a Chinese railway bridge engineer and politician who served as Vice Minister of Railways from 1959 until his death in 1975. He was an academician of the Chinese Academy of Sciences.

== Biography ==
Wang was born into a Protestant family in Shanghai, on 29 December 1906, while his ancestral home in Xiuning County, Anhui. His father Wang Xianming (汪显明) was a minister of the Presbyterianism as well as mathematics teacher. His mother Xie Jinghai (谢靖海) graduated from Hongdao High School for Girls, which was founded by the American Baptist Churches USA and Presbyterian Mission Agency. His younger brother Wang Juyuan was a horticulturist and an academician of the Chinese Academy of Engineering. In 1923, he was admitted to Nanyang University, but a year later transferred to Tangshan Jiaotong University, where he majored in the Department of Civil Engineering. In January 1927, he was sent by the Ministry of Transportation and Communications to study in the United States. After earning a master's degree in civil engineering from Cornell University, he was hired by the American Bridge Company as a designer.

He returned to China in June 1930 and served in the Ministry of Railways of the Republic of China. In 1944, he concurrently served as deputy chief engineer of China Bridge Corporation, serving until 1946. In 1945, he was sent by the Ministry of Transportation and Communications to the United States to inspect railways for a year. After returning, he became manager and chief engineer of Shanghai Branch of China Bridge Corporation.

In August 1949, he was appointed head of the Public Works Department of Shanghai Railway Bureau, and held that office until 1950. He became deputy director of the General Administration of Engineering, Ministry of Railways in 1950, and served until 1954. He became chief engineer of Wuhan Yangtze River Bridge Engineering Bureau from 1954 to 1958, then returned to the Ministry of Railways, where he was appointed as vice minister in 1959.

On 26 February 1975, he died of liver cancer in Beijing, aged 68.

He was a delegate to the 1st, 2nd and 3rd National People's Congress.

== Honours and awards ==
- 1957 Member of the Chinese Academy of Sciences (CAS)
