= Declaration of the first plenary session of the Chinese People's Political Consultative Conference =

The Declaration of the First Plenary Session of the Chinese People's Political Consultative Conference was adopted by the first plenary session of the Chinese People's Political Consultative Conference on September 30, 1949. It announced the establishment of the People's Republic of China, introduced the achievements of the conference, and the policy program of the newly established Central People's Government of the People's Republic of China, and called on the people of the whole country to organize and "support the people's government and the People's Liberation Army and establish an independent, democratic, peaceful, unified and prosperous new China."

== Formulation ==
On June 15, 1949, the Preparatory Committee of the New Political Consultative Conference was established in Beijing and held its first plenary session. On June 16, the first meeting of the Standing Committee of the Preparatory Committee of the New Political Consultative Conference decided to establish six groups, led by the Standing Committee of the Preparatory Committee of the New Political Consultative Conference. Among them, the fifth group was responsible for drafting the conference declaration of the New Political Consultative Conference (later named "Declaration of the First Plenary Session of the Chinese People's Political Consultative Conference"). The first plenary meeting of the fifth group presided over Guo Moruo, Hu Yuzhi and Hu Qiaomu to draft the first draft of the conference declaration. The second plenary meeting of the fifth group revised the draft conference declaration proposed by Guo Moruo and others.

As the work of drafting the declaration of the conference was not completed on time, on September 16, 1949, the Sixth Session of the Standing Committee of the Preparatory Committee of the New Political Consultative Conference agreed to transfer the work of drafting the "Declaration of the First Plenary Session of the Chinese People's Political Consultative Conference" and drafting the national flag and national emblem to the Presidium of the Chinese People's Political Consultative Conference for decision. On September 17, the Second Plenary Session of the Preparatory Committee of the New Political Consultative Conference decided to transfer the work of drafting the "Declaration of the First Plenary Session of the Chinese People's Political Consultative Conference" to the First Plenary Session of the Chinese People's Political Consultative Conference, and the Fifth Group, which was originally responsible for this work, submitted a report to the Presidium of the First Plenary Session of the Chinese People's Political Consultative Conference. On September 22, the First Plenary Session of the Chinese People's Political Consultative Conference decided to establish a declaration drafting committee, and the work of the Fifth Group of the Preparatory Committee was completed.

Mao Zedong, who served as the chairman of the Standing Committee of the Preparatory Committee of the New Political Consultative Conference, not only personally led the formulation of the " Common Program of the Chinese People's Political Consultative Conference" and other documents, but also accepted the commission of the First Plenary Session of the Chinese People's Political Consultative Conference and personally drafted the "Declaration of the First Plenary Session of the Chinese People's Political Consultative Conference". The manuscript consists of 6 pages and is now preserved in the Central Archives. The sentence "under the leadership of Chairman Mao Zedong, the leader of the people" in the declaration was proposed by the representatives when the conference passed the declaration.

On September 30, 1949, all the delegates attending the First Plenary Session of the Chinese People's Political Consultative Conference elected members of the First National Committee of the Chinese People's Political Consultative Conference and the chairman, Vice Chairman and members of the Central People's Government of the People's Republic of China. At 6:00 p.m., while the votes were being counted, all the delegates went to Tiananmen Square to hold a foundation-laying ceremony for the Monument to the People's Heroes. The delegates then returned to the Huairen Hall in Zhongnanhai to continue the meeting. The Executive Chairman of the Conference announced the election results of the First National Committee of the CPPCC and the Central People's Government Committee. The Conference then adopted the "Declaration of the First Plenary Session of the Chinese People's Political Consultative Conference" and the "Telegram of Condolences to the Chinese People's Liberation Army". Finally, Zhu De, Vice Chairman of the Central People's Government, delivered a closing speech. The Conference ended at this point.

On October 1, 1949, the day of the proclamation of the People's Republic of China, the “Manifesto of the First Plenary Session of the Chinese People’s Political Consultative Conference” was published in full in the People’s Daily.

== Content ==
The Declaration of the First Plenary Session of the Chinese People's Political Consultative Conference begins with “My fellow countrymen” and is divided into six paragraphs. The first two paragraphs briefly introduce the successful conclusion of the First Plenary Session of the Chinese People's Political Consultative Conference and the situation of the representatives.

The third paragraph reviews the continuous struggle of the Chinese people over the past 100 years under the leadership of advanced elements such as Sun Yat-sen, the great revolutionary who led the 1911 Revolution, "to overthrow the oppression of imperialism and the reactionary government of China", and points out that this struggle has now been won by the Chinese people and the People's Liberation Army led by the Chinese Communist Party. "As we meet, the Chinese people have defeated their enemies, changed the face of China, and established the People's Republic of China. Our 475 million Chinese people have now stood up, and the future of our nation is infinitely bright." Earlier on September 21, Mao Zedong delivered his famous speech "The Chinese People Have Stood Up" at the First Plenary Session of the Chinese People's Political Consultative Conference.

The fourth paragraph introduces the main achievements of this conference. "Under the leadership of Chairman Mao Zedong, the leader of the people, our conference has achieved the following tasks in accordance with the principles of New Democracy":

1. Formulated the Organization Law of the Chinese People's Political Consultative Conference
2. Formulated the Organic Law of the Central People's Government of the People's Republic of China
3. Formulated the Common Program of the Chinese People's Political Consultative Conference
4. Decided to make Beijing the capital of the People's Republic of China
5. The national flag of the People's Republic of China was established as the five-star red flag
6. The March of the Volunteers is adopted as the current national anthem
7. Decided that the People's Republic of China would adopt the Gregorian calendar
8. The National Committee of the Chinese People's Political Consultative Conference was elected
9. The Central People's Government Council of the People's Republic of China was elected.

The fifth paragraph declared, "My fellow countrymen, the People's Republic of China has now been established, and the Chinese people have their own central government." It also announced the main policy program of the newly established Central People's Government of the People's Republic of China:

1. The people's democratic dictatorship will be implemented throughout China in accordance with the Common Program.
2. He will command the People's Liberation Army to carry the revolutionary war through to the end, eliminate the remaining enemy forces, liberate the country's territory, and complete the great cause of unifying China.
3. It will lead the people of the whole country to overcome all difficulties, carry out large-scale economic and cultural construction, eliminate the poverty and ignorance left over from old China, and gradually improve the people's material life and enhance their cultural life.
4. We will safeguard the interests of the people and suppress all conspiracy activities of counter-revolutionaries
5. We will strengthen the people's army, navy and air force, consolidate national defense, safeguard territorial sovereignty and integrity, and oppose aggression by any imperialist country.
6. We will unite with all peace-loving and freedom-loving countries, nations and peoples, first of all the Soviet Union and the new democratic countries, as our allies, to jointly oppose the imperialists' plot to provoke war and strive for lasting world peace.

The sixth paragraph calls on fellow citizens across the country to further organize themselves and use the collective strength of the people to "support the People's Government and the People's Liberation Army and build an independent, democratic, peaceful, unified and prosperous new China."
