= Shi Liang (disambiguation) =

Shi Liang (1900–1985) was one of the "Seven Gentlemen" and the first Minister of Justice of the PRC.

Shi Liang may also refer to:

- Shi Liang (Ming dynasty), general of Ming Emperor Zhu Yuanzhang
- Shi Liang (footballer), Chinese footballer

== See also ==
- Shi Lang
