= 3rd National People's Congress =

1964–1975 Chinese legislative session

3rd National People's Congress 第三届全国人民代表大会
- National emblem of China

21 December 1964 – 26 February 1975 (10 years, 67 days) Overview
- Type: Supreme organ of state power
- Election: Indirect elections

Leadership
- Chairman: Zhu De
- Vice Chairmen: Peng Zhen, Liu Bocheng, Li Jingquan, Kang Sheng, Guo Moruo, He Xiangning, Huang Yanpei, Chen Shutong, Li Xuefeng, Xu Xiangqian, Yang Mingxuan, Cheng Qian, Saifuddin Azizi, Lin Feng, Liu Ningyi, Zhang Zhizhong, Ngapoi Ngawang Jigme, and Zhou Jianren
- Secretary-General: Liu Ningyi
- Standing Committee: 116 (3rd)

Members
- Total: 3,040 members

3rd National People's Congress
- Traditional Chinese: 第三屆全國人民代表大會
- Simplified Chinese: 第三届全国人民代表大会
Transcriptions
Standard Mandarin
- Hanyu Pinyin: Dìsān Jiè Quánguó Rénmín Dàibiǎo Dàhuì

Abbreviation
- Traditional Chinese: 第三屆全國人大
- Simplified Chinese: 第三届全国人大
Transcriptions
Standard Mandarin
- Hanyu Pinyin: Dìsān Jiè Quánguó Réndà

The 3rd National People's Congress (NPC) was in session from 1964 to 1975. It held only one session in the ten years due to the disruption caused by the ongoing Cultural Revolution launched by Chairman Mao Zedong after 1966.

== Seat distribution ==
Major party	Chairman	Seats
Chinese Communist Party	Mao Zedong	2,668
Other Parties	Chairperson	Seats
Chinese Peasants' and Workers' Democratic Party	Ji Fang	372
Jiusan Society	Xu Deheng	372
China Democratic League	Yang Mingxuan	372
China Association for Promoting Democracy	Ma Xulun	372
China National Democratic Construction Association	Huang Yanpei	372
Revolutionary Committee of the Chinese Kuomintang	He Xiangning	372
Taiwan Democratic Self-Government League	Vacant	372
China Zhi Gong Party	Chen Qiyou	372
Independents	N/A	372

On 22 August 1966, amidst the Cultural Revolution, all of the satellite democratic parties ceased operations after an ultimatum by the Beijing Middle School Red Guards. They would not resume operations until the 5th National People's Congress in 1978.

== The first session ==
The session was held from December 21, 1964, till January 4, 1965. The Congress elected the state leaders:

- Chairman of the People's Republic of China: Liu Shaoqi
- Vice Chairmen of the People's Republic of China: Soong Ching-ling and Dong Biwu
- Chairman of the Standing Committee of the National People's Congress: Zhu De
- Premier of the State Council: Zhou Enlai
- President of the Supreme People's Court: Yang Xiufeng
- Procurator-General of the Supreme People's Procuratorate: Zhang Dingcheng
