= President of the Supreme People's Court =

Head of Chinese judiciary

President of the Supreme People's Court Chief Justice of the People's Republic of China
- 中华人民共和国最高人民法院院长 中华人民共和国首席大法官
- Emblem of the Supreme People's Court

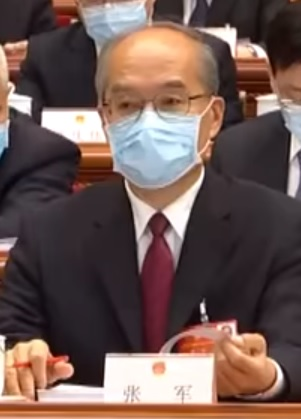
- Incumbent; Zhang Jun since 11 March 2023
- Supreme People's Court
- Status: Deputy national-level official
- Member of: Supreme People's Court
- Reports to: National People's Congress and its Standing Committee
- Seat: Beijing
- Nominator: Presidium of the National People's Congress
- Appointer: National People's Congress
- Term length: Five years, renewable once consecutively
- Constituting instrument: Constitution of China
- Formation: 1 October 1949; 77 years ago
- First holder: Shen Junru
- Deputy: Vice President of the Supreme People's Court
- Website: www.court.gov.cn/jgsz/zgrmfyld/

President of the Supreme People's Court
- Simplified Chinese: 中华人民共和国最高人民法院院长
- Traditional Chinese: 中華人民共和國最高人民法院院長
Transcriptions
Standard Mandarin
- Hanyu Pinyin: Zhōnghuá Rénmín Gònghéguó Zuìgāo Rénmín Fǎyuàn Yuànzhǎng

Chief Justice of the People's Republic of China
- Simplified Chinese: 中华人民共和国首席大法官
- Traditional Chinese: 中華人民共和國首席大法官
Transcriptions
Standard Mandarin
- Hanyu Pinyin: Zhōnghuá Rénmín Gònghéguó Shǒuxídà Fǎguān

The president of the Supreme People's Court, concurrently legally titled the Chief Justice of the People's Republic of China, is the head of the Supreme People's Court and is the highest-ranking official in the judiciary of China.

Under the current constitution, the president of the SPC is appointed by and serves at the pleasure of the National People's Congress (NPC), the legislature. The incumbent president of the Supreme People's Court is Zhang Jun, who took office on 11 March 2023.

== History ==
The Supreme People's Court of the Central People's Government was established on 1 October 1949. Shen Junru served as the first president by the first plenary session of the Chinese People's Political Consultative Conference.

On 27 September 1954, the SPC of the Central People's Government was replaced with the SPC of the People's Republic of China.

== Selection ==
According to the Organic Law of the National People's Congress (NPC), constitutionally China's supreme organ of state power, the president is nominated by the NPC Presidium, the Congress's executive organ. However, the nomination is effectively made by the Chinese Communist Party, with the decisions being made among Party leaders. Candidates for top positions including the president are first approved first by the CCP's Politburo Standing Committee, and then by its Politburo, then approved in a special plenary session the Central Committee just before the NPC session for election by the Congress, with the Presidium presenting the nominee during the NPC session. Although the Presidium could theoretically nominate multiple candidates for the presidency, leading the election to be competitive, it has always nominated a single candidate for the office.

After the nomination, the president is elected by the NPC, which also has the power to remove the president and other state officers from office. Elections and removals are decided by majority vote. The length of the president's term of office is the same as the NPC, which is 5 years, and the president is restricted to two consecutive terms. Since 2018, the president is required to recite the constitutional oath of office before assuming office.

== Powers ==
According to the Judges Law of the People's Republic of China, the president of the SPC is the chief justice of the People's Republic of China.

== List of presidents ==
No.	Chairperson	NPC term	Took office	Left office	Political Party
President of the Supreme People's Court of the Central People's Government
1	Shen Junru 沈钧儒	N/A	October 1, 1949	September 27, 1954	China Democratic League (CDL)
President of the Supreme People's Court of the People's Republic of China
2	Dong Biwu 董必武	1st	September 27, 1954	April 27, 1959	Chinese Communist Party (CCP)
3	Xie Juezai 谢觉哉	2nd	April 27, 1959	January 3, 1965	Chinese Communist Party (CCP)
4	Yang Xiufeng 杨秀峰	3rd	January 3, 1965	January 20, 1975	Chinese Communist Party (CCP)
5	Jiang Hua 江华	4th	January 20, 1975	March 5, 1978	Chinese Communist Party (CCP)
5	Jiang Hua 江华	5th	March 5, 1978	June 20, 1983	Chinese Communist Party (CCP)
6	Zheng Tianxiang 郑天翔	6th	June 20, 1983	April 9, 1988	Chinese Communist Party (CCP)
7	Ren Jianxin 任建新	7th	April 9, 1988	March 28, 1993	Chinese Communist Party (CCP)
7	Ren Jianxin 任建新	8th	March 28, 1993	March 17, 1998	Chinese Communist Party (CCP)
8	Xiao Yang 肖扬	9th	March 17, 1998	March 16, 2003	Chinese Communist Party (CCP)
8	Xiao Yang 肖扬	10th	March 16, 2003	March 16, 2008	Chinese Communist Party (CCP)
9	Wang Shengjun 王胜俊	11th	March 16, 2008	March 15, 2013	Chinese Communist Party (CCP)
10	Zhou Qiang 周强	12th	March 15, 2013	March 18, 2018	Chinese Communist Party (CCP)
10	Zhou Qiang 周强	13th	March 18, 2018	March 11, 2023	Chinese Communist Party (CCP)
11	Zhang Jun 张军	14th	March 11, 2023	Incumbent	Chinese Communist Party (CCP)
