= Chu Tunan =

Chinese politician

- 楚图南
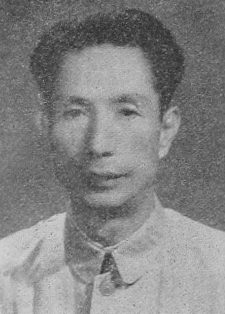
- Chu in 1949

Vice Chairman of the Standing Committee of the National People's Congress
- In office 12 April 1986 – 8 April 1988
- Chairman: Peng Zhen

Chairman of the China Democratic League
- In office 1986 – January 1987
- Preceded by: Hu Yuzhi
- Succeeded by: Fei Xiaotong

Personal details
- Born: 18 August 1899 Wenshan City, Yunnan
- Died: 11 April 1994 (aged 94)
- Party: China Democratic League
- Education: Beijing Normal University

Chu Tunan (simplified Chinese: 楚图南; traditional Chinese: 楚圖南; August 18, 1899 – April 11, 1994), a native of Wenshan, Yunnan, was a Chinese male politician, who served as a vice-chairperson of the Standing Committee of the 6th National People's Congress and the chairman of the China Democratic League.

== Biography ==
In 1913, he was admitted to the Union High School in Kunming, and in 1919, he was admitted to the History and Geography Department of the Beijing Higher Normal School (later Beijing Normal University), where he joined the Chinese Socialist Youth League and edited and published the newspaper Labor Culture under the guidance of Li Dazhao. After graduating in 1920, he returned to Yunnan to teach in a series of high schools and organized a "reading club" among students sympathetic to the Communist Party. In 1926, Li Dazhao informed him that he would go to Northeast China to work for the CPC as a teacher, and in the winter of 1926, he officially became a member of the CPC.

He was arrested and imprisoned from 1930 to 1934 for his involvement in the Jilin School Tide. After his release from prison, he assumed the pseudonym Chu Zeng (Chinese: 楚曾) and became a lecturer and professor at Jinan University in Shanghai. After the outbreak of the Second Sino-Japanese War, he traveled to Kunming via Hong Kong and Haiphong, where he taught in the Department of Literature and History at Yunnan University. In 1943, he joined the China Democratic League (CDL) and became one of the leaders of the Yunnan organization. In 1946, he hosted memorials and protests for Li Gongpu and Wen Yiduo after their assassination by Kuomintang. In 1946, he went to Shanghai, where he became a professor at the Shanghai Law School, and then lived in exile in Hong Kong after the ban on the CDL by Kuomintang. In 1949, he participated in the Proclamation of the People's Republic of China at the Tiananmen Square.

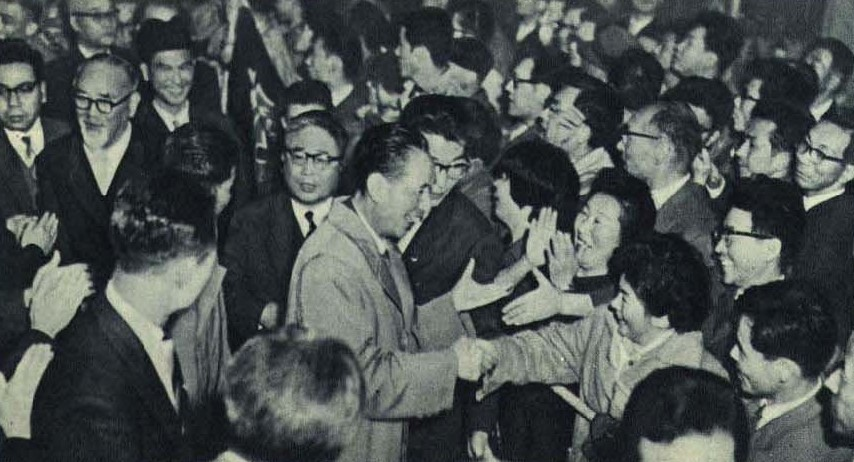
On November 20, 1961, Chair Chu Tunan led the Chinese People's Association for Friendship with Foreign Countries to visit Japan.

After the establishment of the People's Republic of China, he served as the president of the Chinese People's Association for Friendship with Foreign Countries. In 1954, the Chinese Historical Society announced the list of its first board of governors, with Guo Moruo as president, Wu Yuzhang and Fan Wenlan as vice-presidents, and him as a councilor. He was elected as a member of the Standing Committee of the Central Committee of the CNDL in 1956, and was elected as a vice-chairman of the Central Committee in 1958. During the Cultural Revolution, Chu Tunan was sent down in Minggang, Henan Province, until he was allowed to return to Beijing in 1971.

He was twice elected vice-chairman of the Central Committee of the NLD, in 1979 and 1983, and in 1986 he became Acting Chairman and Chairman of the Central Committee. He also served for a long time as a delegate to the National People's Congress and a member of the Standing Committee of the Chinese People's Political Consultative Conference (CPPCC), and in April 1986 he was elected vice-chairman of the Standing Committee of the Sixth National People's Congress.

He died on April 11, 1994, at the age of 95 in Beijing.
