= 2nd National People's Congress =

1959–1964 Chinese legislative session

2nd National People's Congress 第二届全国人民代表大会
- National emblem of China

18 April 1959 – 21 December 1964 (5 years, 247 days) Overview
- Type: Supreme organ of state power
- Election: Indirect elections

Leadership
- Chairman: Zhu De
- Vice Chairmen: Lin Boqu, Li Jishen, Luo Ronghuan, Shen Junru, Guo Moruo, Huang Yanpei, Peng Zhen, Li Weihan, Chen Shutong, Tenzin Gyatso, Saifuddin Azizi, Cheng Qian, Choekyi Gyaltsen, He Xiangning, Liu Bocheng, and Lin Feng
- Secretary-General: Peng Zhen
- Standing Committee: 80 (2nd)

Members
- Total: 1,235 members

2nd National People's Congress
- Traditional Chinese: 第二屆全國人民代表大會
- Simplified Chinese: 第二届全国人民代表大会
Transcriptions
Standard Mandarin
- Hanyu Pinyin: Dì Èr Jiè Quánguó Rénmín Dàibiǎo Dàhuì

Abbreviation
- Traditional Chinese: 第二屆全國人大
- Simplified Chinese: 第二届全国人大
Transcriptions
Standard Mandarin
- Hanyu Pinyin: Dì Èr Jiè Quánguó Réndà

The 2nd National People's Congress (NPC) was in session from 1959 to 1964. It held four sessions in this period.

== Background ==
Since the succeeding Congress was to be the first to be elected under the 1954 Constitution of the People's Republic of China, the Standing Committee of the National People's Congress, in February 1959, finished all the preparatory work for selection of deputies, which were voted by representatives of the provincial legislatures and the city legislatures of the then two Direct-administered municipalities of China: Beijing and Shanghai. The elections were held in accordance with the 1953 Electoral Law.

== Seat distribution ==
Major party	Chairman	Seats
Chinese Communist Party	Mao Zedong	1,047
Other Parties	Chairperson	Seats
Chinese Peasants' and Workers' Democratic Party	Ji Fang	179
Jiusan Society	Xu Deheng	179
China Democratic League	Shen Junru	179
China Association for Promoting Democracy	Zhou Jianren	179
China National Democratic Construction Association	Huang Yanpei	179
Revolutionary Committee of the Chinese Kuomintang	Li Jishen; He Xiangning	179
Taiwan Democratic Self-Government League	Vacant	179
China Zhi Gong Party	Chen Qiyou	179
Independents	N/A	179

== The first session ==
The first session was held in 18–28 April 1959. During the first session, Mao Zedong relinquished his role as chairman of the People's Republic to Liu Shaoqi. The Congress elected the state leaders:

- Chairman of the People's Republic of China: Liu Shaoqi
- Vice Chairmen of the People's Republic of China: Soong Ching-ling and Dong Biwu
- Chairman of the Standing Committee of the National People's Congress: Zhu De
- Premier of the State Council: Zhou Enlai
- President of the Supreme People's Court: Xie Juezai
- Procurator-General of the Supreme People's Procuratorate: Zhang Dingcheng

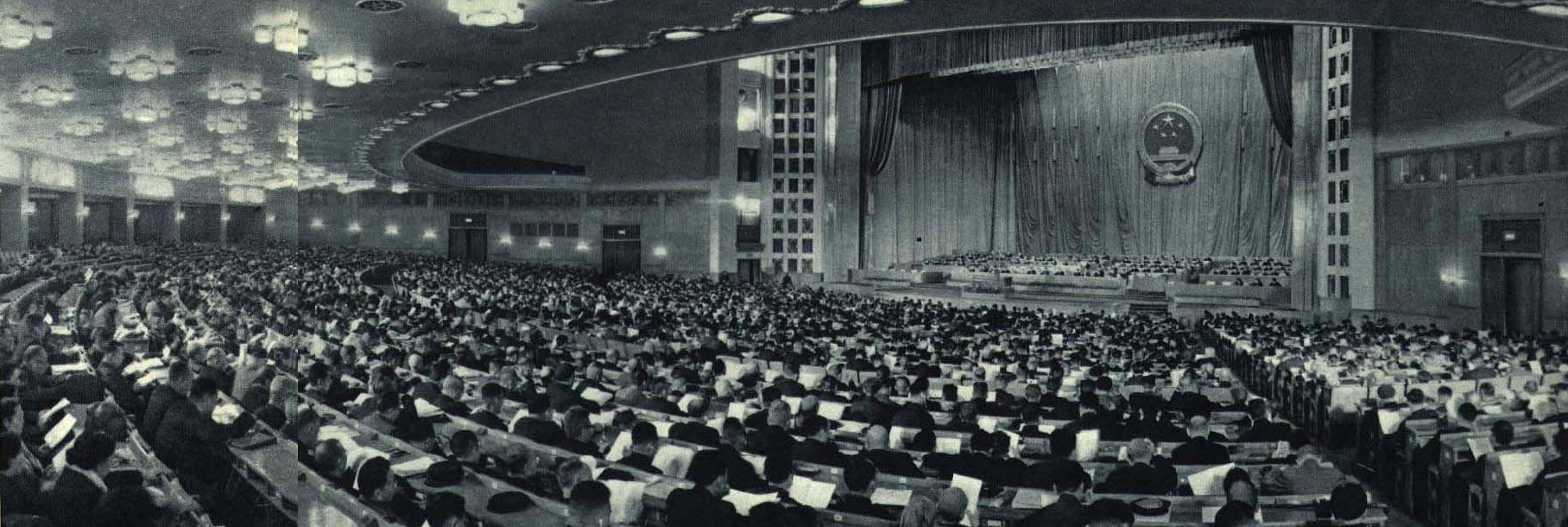
The third session of the 2nd NPC in 1962.

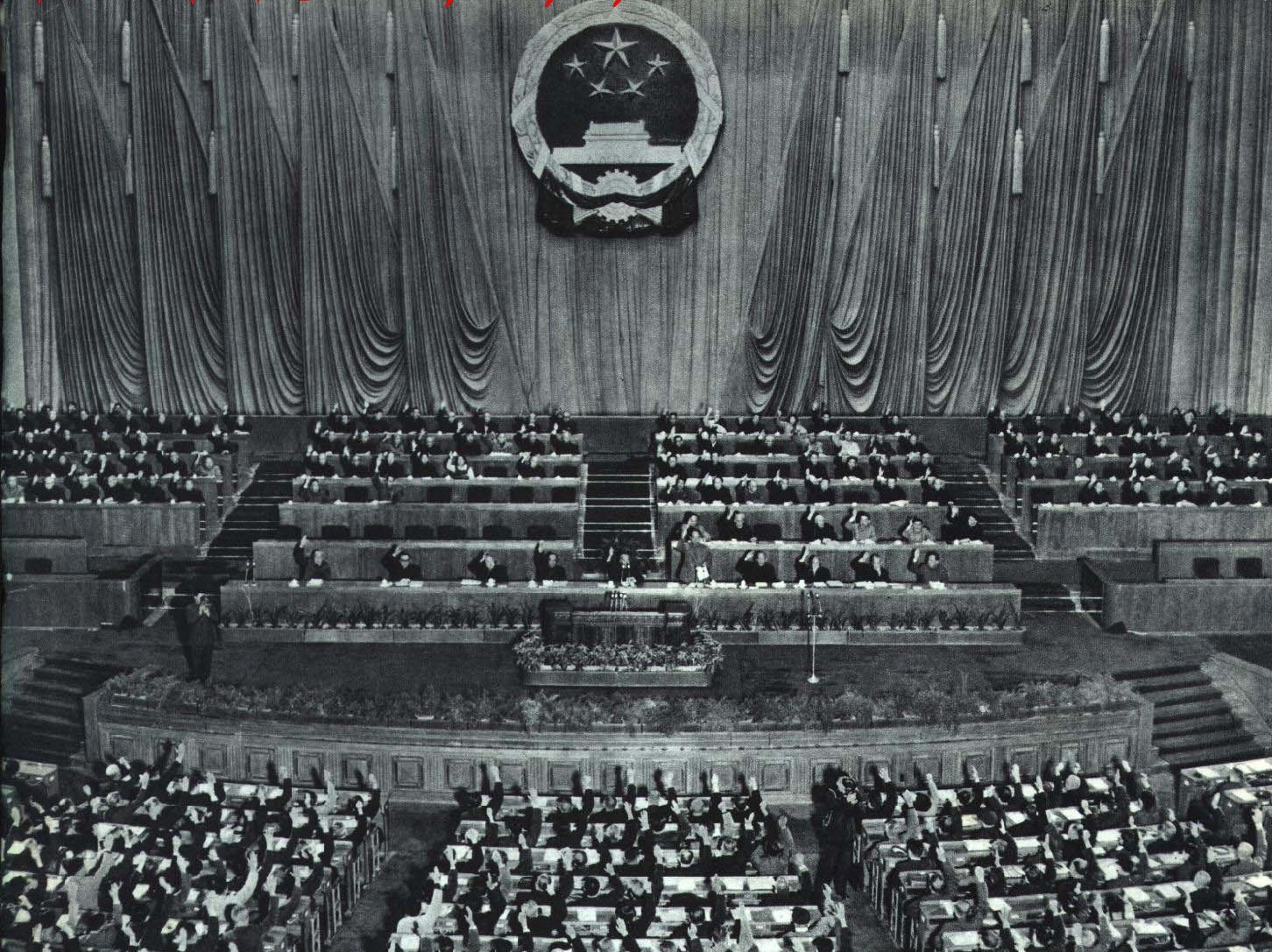
The fourth session of the 2nd NPC in 1966.
