= Proclamation of the People's Republic of China =

Historical event in China

- Part of the Chinese Civil War and the Chinese Communist Revolution
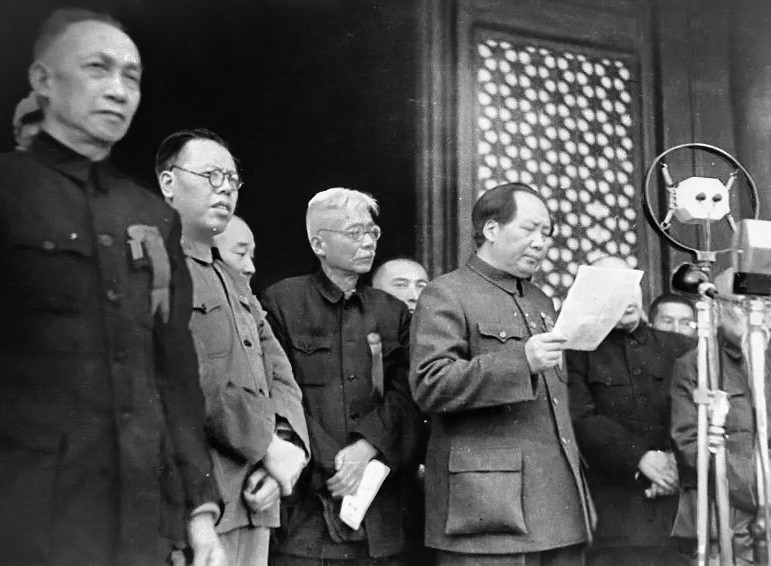
- Mao Zedong proclaiming the foundation of the People's Republic of China on 1 October 1949
- Native name: 中华人民共和国开国大典
- English name: Founding Ceremony of the People's Republic of China
- Date: 1 October 1949; 77 years ago
- Venue: Tiananmen Square
- Location: Beijing
- Participants: Mao Zedong; Chinese Communist Party; People's Liberation Army; Representatives of Democratic Parties

National flag of the People's Republic of China

The People's Republic of China was proclaimed by Mao Zedong, the chairman of the Chinese Communist Party (CCP), on 1 October 1949, in Tiananmen Square in Beijing. The government of a new state under the CCP, formally called the Central People's Government, was proclaimed by Mao at the ceremony, which marked the foundation of contemporary China.

Previously, the CCP had proclaimed the establishment of the Chinese Soviet Republic (CSR) within the discontinuous territories of China they controlled, on 7 November 1931, in Ruijin. The CSR had lasted seven years until it was abolished in 1937.

"March of the Volunteers" was played as the new national anthem, and the new national flag of the People's Republic of China (the Five-starred Red Flag) was officially unveiled to the newly founded state and hoisted for the first time during the celebrations as a 21-gun salute fired in the distance. The first public military parade of the People's Liberation Army took place following the national flag raising with the playing of the PRC national anthem.

The Republic of China (ROC) had retreated to the island of Taiwan by December 1949.

== Historical background ==
The Chinese Civil War was fought between the Kuomintang (KMT)-led Nationalist government of the ROC and the CCP lasting intermittently between 1927 and 1949. The war is generally divided into two phases with an interlude: from the August 1927 to 1937, the First United Front collapsed during the Northern Expedition, and the Nationalists controlled most of China. On 7 November 1931, the Chinese Soviet Republic (CSR) was declared by the CCP in Ruijin within Communist-controlled areas of China and the CSR government moved north to Yan'an during the Long March until the CSR's dissolution. From 1937 to 1945, hostilities were put on hold, and the Second United Front fought the Japanese invasion of China with eventual help from the World War II Allies. The civil war resumed with the Japanese defeat, and the CCP gained the upper hand in the final phase of the war from 1945 to 1949, generally referred to as the Chinese Communist Revolution.

Mao initially suggested continuing the Republic of China under new leadership, but overseas Chinese entrepreneur-activist Tan Kah Kee strong objected to the use of the old name, urging a clean break with the former regime. After discussions, the committee agreed to Zhang Xiruo's suggestion of "People's Republic of China."

Major combat in the Chinese Civil War ended in 1949 with the CCP in control of most of mainland China, and the Kuomintang retreating offshore, reducing its territory to only Taiwan (a former Japanese colony that was received in 1945), Hainan, and their surrounding islands. On 21 September 1949, CCP Chairman Mao Zedong announced the establishment of the People's Republic of China with a speech at the first plenary session of the Chinese People's Political Consultative Conference. This was followed by a mass celebration in Tiananmen Square on October 1, at which the proclamation was made publicly by Mao at the Tiananmen Gate, the date becoming the new country's first National Day.

== Declaration ==
At exactly 15:00 Beijing Time on 1 October 1949, Mao announced to the nation from the top of the Tiananmen Gate:

同胞们，中华人民共和国中央人民政府今天成立了！
Tóngbāo men, Zhōnghuá Rénmín Gònghéguó Zhōngyāng Rénmín Zhèngfǔ jīntiān chénglì le!

Fellow countrymen, the Central People's Government of the People's Republic of China was established today!

After the national anthem had been played, Chairman Mao proclaimed the founding of the People's Republic of China that day on top of the Tiananmen Gate, declaring:

The people throughout China have been plunged into bitter suffering and tribulations since the Chiang Kai-shek Kuomintang reactionary government betrayed the fatherland, colluded with imperialists, and launched the counter-revolutionary war. Fortunately our People's Liberation Army, backed by the whole nation, has been fighting heroically and selflessly to defend the territorial sovereignty of our homeland, to protect the people's lives and property, to relieve the people of their sufferings, and to struggle for their rights, and it eventually wiped out the reactionary troops and overthrew the reactionary rule of the Nationalist government. Now, the People's War of Liberation has been basically won, and the majority of the people in the country have been liberated. On this foundation, the first session of the Chinese People's Political Consultative Conference, composed of delegates of all the democratic parties and people's organization of China, the People's Liberation Army, the various regions and nationalities of the country, and the overseas Chinese and other patriotic elements, has been convened.

Representing the will of the whole nation, [this session of the conference] has enacted the organic law of the Central People's Government of the People's Republic of China, elected

- Mao Zedong as chairman of the Central People's Government;
- Zhu De, Liu Shaoqi, Song Qingling, Li Jishen, Zhang Lan, and Gao Gang as (vice chairmen of the Central People's Government); and
- Chen Yi, He Long, Li Lisan, Lin Boqu, Ye Jianying, He Xiangning, Lin Biao, Peng Dehuai, Liu Bocheng, Wu Yuzhang, Xu Xiangqian, Peng Zhen, Bo Yibo, Nie Rongzhen, Zhou Enlai, Dong Biwu, Seypidin Azizi, Rao Shushi, Tan Kah-kee [Chen Jiageng], Luo Ronghuan, Deng Zihui, Ulanhu, Xu Teli, Cai Chang, Liu Geping, Ma Yinchu, Chen Yun, Kang Sheng, Lin Feng, Ma Xulun, Guo Moruo, Zhang Yunyi, Deng Xiaoping, Gao Chongmin, Shen Junru, Shen Yanbing, Chen Shutong, Szeto Mei-tong [Situ Meitang], Li Xijiu, Huang Yanpei, Cai Tingkai, Xi Zhongxun, Peng Zemin, Zhang Zhizhong, Fu Zuoyi, Li Zhuchen, Li Zhangda, Zhang Nanxian, Liu Yazi, Zhang Dongsun, and Long Yun as council members to form the Central People's Government Council,

proclaimed the founding of the People's Republic of China and decided on Beijing as the capital of the People's Republic of China.

The Central People's Government Council of the People's Republic of China took office today in the capital and unanimously made the following decisions:

- to proclaim the establishment of the Central People's Government of the People's Republic of China;
- to adopt the Common Program of the Chinese People's Political Consultative Conference as the policy of the government;
- to elect Lin Boqu from among the council members as secretary general of the Central People's Government Council;
- to appoint Zhou Enlai as premier of the Government Administration Council of the Central People's Government and concurrently minister of Foreign Affairs,
- Mao Zedong as chairman of the People's Revolutionary Military Commission of the Central People's Government,
- Zhu De as commander-in-chief of the People's Liberation Army,
- Shen Junru as president of the Supreme People's Court of the Central People's Government, and
- Luo Ronghuan as procurator general of the Supreme People's Procuratorate of the Central People's Government,

and to charge them with the task of the speedy formation of the various organs of the government to carry out the work of the government.

At the same time, the Central People's Government Council decided to declare to the governments of all other countries that this government is the sole legal government representing all the people of the People's Republic of China. This government is willing to establish diplomatic relations with any foreign government that is willing to observe the principles of equality, mutual benefit, and mutual respect of territorial integrity and sovereignty.

Beijing, October 1, 1949

— Mao Zedong
Chairman
The Central People's Government of the People's Republic of China

== Celebrations ==
The first National Day military parade took place right after the proclamation of the PRC. Commanded by Nie Rongzhen, the Commander of the Northern China Military Region and inspected by Zhu De, the Commander-in-Chief of the PLA, the parade involved around 16,000 PLA officers and personnel. The parade, which was approved in June 1949, was the first large-scale and modern Chinese military parade, with the country having never done a public review of troops before under previous governments. Liu Bocheng proposed to parade directors Yang Chengwu and Tang Yanjie be organized in the Soviet format, having personally witnessed a military parade on Red Square in Moscow. The Northern Military Region Band (now the Central Military Band of the PLA) provided musical accompaniment which included the Military Anthem of the People's Liberation Army.

== Aftermath ==
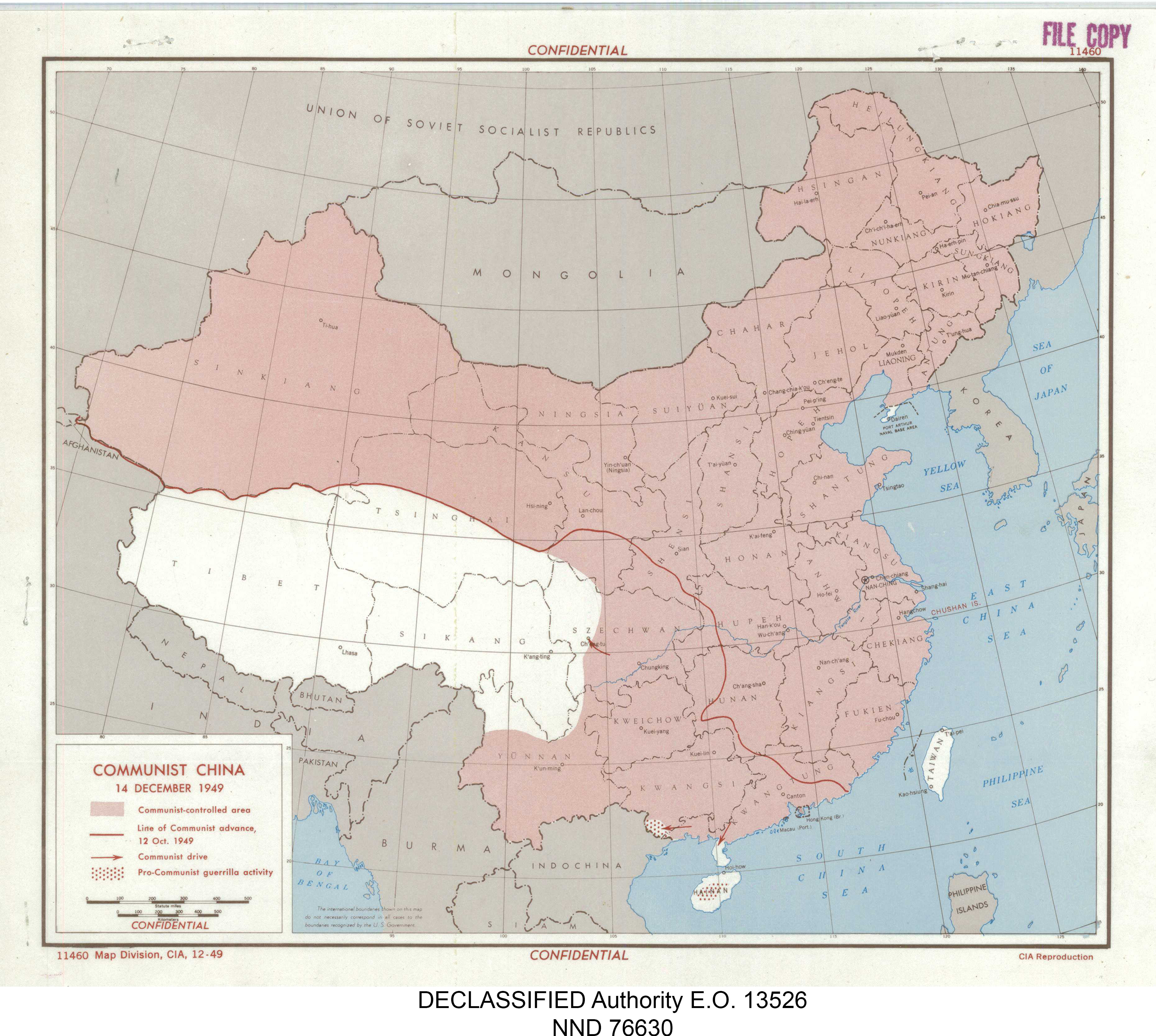
In December 1949, Chinese Communist forces controlled the entirety of mainland China except Hainan and de facto independent Tibet

The Republic of China retreated to the island of Taiwan by December 1949. The CCP remains the sole ruling party of China, officially the People's Republic of China (PRC), since 1 October 1949. The PRC officially claims Taiwan as its 23rd province as Taiwan Province, People's Republic of China in its constitution. The People's Republic of China on mainland China and Republic of China on Taiwan both officially claim to be the legitimate government of all China. No armistice or peace treaty has ever been signed over the Chinese Civil War.

On 2 October 1949, the Soviet Union recognized the PRC, becoming the first country to do so. This was shortly followed by other communist states, including Bulgaria, Romania, Hungary, North Korea, Czechoslovakia, Poland, Mongolia, East Germany, Albania, and North Vietnam. However, many Western countries, including the United States, initially continued to recognize the move of the ROC to Taiwan as the legitimate government of China. Following the proclamation, the PRC moved quickly to consolidate its power from the ROC and began nationalizing industries.

== Reactions ==
- (Republic of China (1912–1949)) The Government of the Republic of China and the Kuomintang leader Chiang Kai-shek through his letter on the 38th Republic of China National Day described the PRC as a "puppet regime of the Soviet Union".

== See also ==
- Outline of the Chinese Civil War
- Retreat of the Republic of China to Taiwan
