= China Democratic League =

Minor political party in China

China Democratic League 中国民主同盟 Zhōngguó Mínzhǔ Tóngméng
- Chairperson: Ding Zhongli
- Founded: 19 March 1941; 85 years ago; Chongqing
- Banned: 27 October 1947; 79 years ago (by the Nationalist government)
- Headquarters: Dongchang Hutong, Dongcheng District, Beijing
- Newspaper: Popular Tribune; Central Communications of the League; Guangming Daily (1949–1982)
- Membership (2023): 356,900
- Ideology: Socialism with Chinese characteristics; 1941–1947: Big tent; Centrism; Multi-party democracy
- National People's Congress (14th): 56 / 2,977
- NPC Standing Committee (14th): 9 / 175
- CPPCC National Committee (14th): 65 / 544 (Seats for political parties)

Website
- mmzy.org.cn

China Democratic League

Chinese name
- Simplified Chinese: 中国民主同盟
- Traditional Chinese: 中國民主同盟
Transcriptions
Standard Mandarin
- Hanyu Pinyin: Zhōngguó Mínzhǔ Tóngméng
- Wade–Giles: Chung1-kuo2 Min2-chu3 Tʻung2-mêng

Abbreviation
- Chinese: 民盟
Transcriptions
Standard Mandarin
- Hanyu Pinyin: Mínméng
- Wade–Giles: Min2-mêng2

Tibetan name
- Tibetan: ཀྲུང་གོ་དམངས་གཙོ་མནའ་མཐུན
Transcriptions
- Wylie: krung go dmangs gtso mna' mthun

Zhuang name
- Zhuang: Cunghgoz Minzcuj Dungzmungz

Mongolian name
- Mongolian Cyrillic: Дундад улсын ардчилсан холбоо
- Mongolian script: ᠳᠤᠮᠳᠠᠳᠤ ᠤᠯᠤᠰ ᠤᠨ ᠠᠷᠠᠳᠴᠢᠯᠠᠭᠰᠠᠨ ᠬᠣᠯᠪᠣᠭ᠎ᠠ
Transcriptions
- SASM/GNC: Dundad ulsin ardchilsan kholboo

Uyghur name
- Uyghur: جۇڭگو دېموكراتىك ئىتتىپاقى
Transcriptions
- Latin Yëziqi: Junggo démokratik ittipaqi
- Yengi Yeziⱪ: Junggo démokratik ittipaqi

Manchu name
- Manchu script: ᠮᡳᠨᠮᡝᠩ
- Romanization: Minmeng

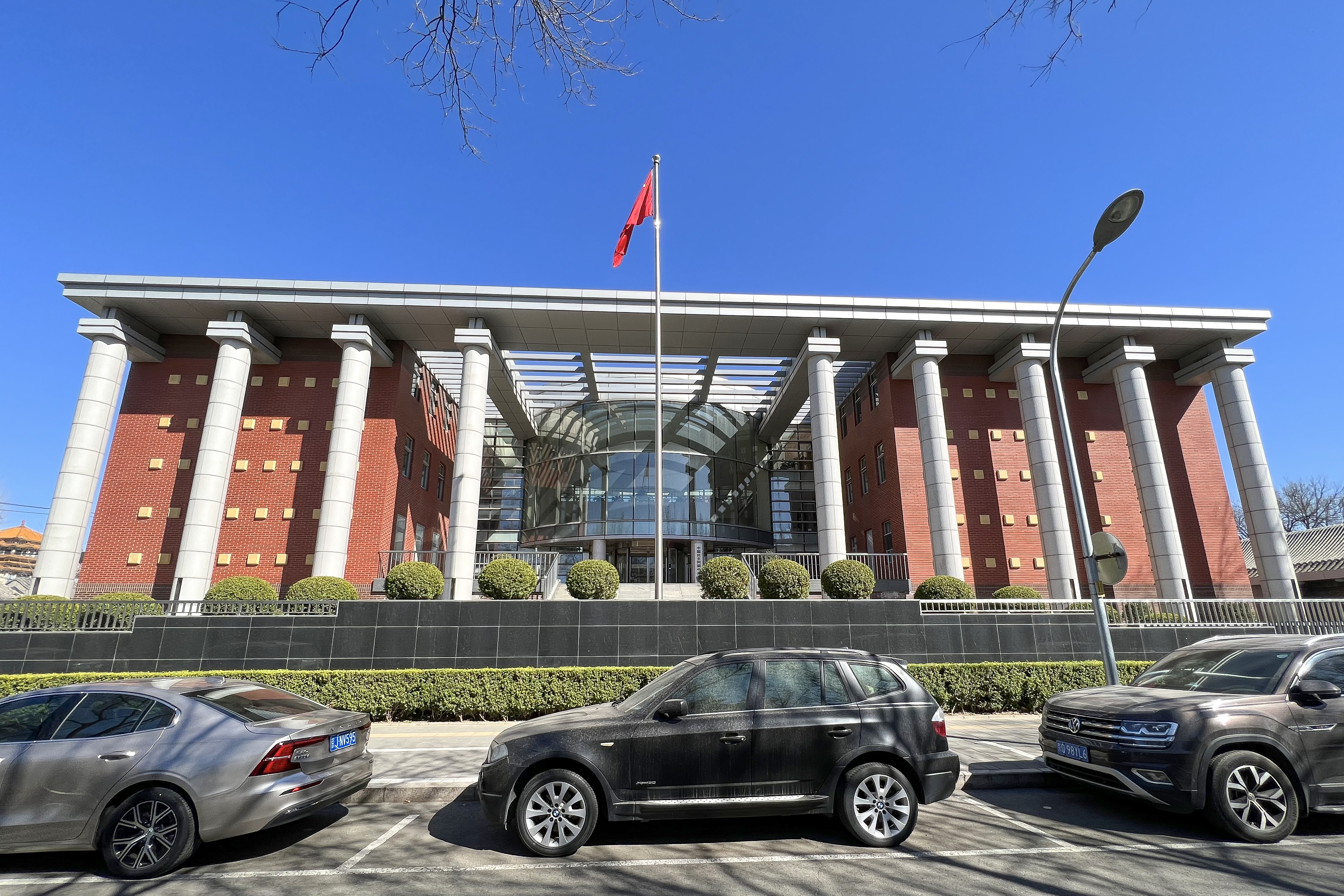
The headquarters of the Central Committee of the CDL

The China Democratic League (CDL) is one of the eight minor non-oppositional political parties in the People's Republic of China, officially termed "democratic parties," led by the Chinese Communist Party. The CDL was originally founded in 1941 as a pro-democracy umbrella coalition group of the China Democratic Socialist Party, the Young China Party and the Chinese Peasants' and Workers' Democratic Party to fight the Imperial Japanese Army while providing for a "Third Force". During the Chinese Civil War, the Kuomintang-led Nationalist government outlawed the CDL in 1947 for subversion and it has been aligned with the CCP since.

As of December 2023, the CDL had around 356,900 members. Its membership mostly consists of mid and senior-level intellectuals in the fields of culture, education, natural and social sciences, and technology. The CDL is the second-ranking minor party in China after the Revolutionary Committee of the Chinese Kuomintang. It currently has 56 seats in the National People's Congress, 9 seats in the NPC Standing Committee and 65 seats in the Chinese People's Political Consultative Conference. Its current chairman is Ding Zhongli.

== History ==
The China Democratic Political League was established in Chongqing on 19 March 1941, and changed its name to the China Democratic League in September 1944. At its formation, it was a coalition of three pro-democracy parties and three pressure groups. Its two main goals were to support China's war effort during the Second Sino-Japanese War and to provide a centrist "third force" between the Kuomintang and the Chinese Communist Party. Influential members or supporters included Liang Shuming, Zhang Dongsun, Carsun Chang, Luo Longji, Pan Guangdan, Huang Yanpei, Fei Xiaotong, Li Huang of the Young China Party, Wu Han, Chu Anping, and Wen Yiduo.

After the war, many Americans in China were sympathetic to the League. Theodore White wrote that if "the men of the middle group were well organized, they could guarantee peace. But they are not. They lack an army, a political machine, roots in any social class. Only the spread of education and industry can create enough men of the modern world to give them a broad social base."

In October 1945, the League released a report reaffirming its political commitments and outlining its goals. In it, the League declared themselves to be neither left nor right, favoring neither liberal democracy nor socialist democracy. Although the report praised elements of Western liberal democracies, it also criticized the economic inequalities that existed in Western capitalist societies. The report thus concluded that the best form of democracy for China would incorporate elements of both "Western political democracy" and "Soviet economic democracy". To achieve this, the League hoped to work with both the Nationalists and the Communists in a coalition government to write a new constitution. However, the League is also seen as a liberal-democratic "third force" alternative movement compared to the Nationalists (Chiangism) and the Communists (Maoism) who favor authoritarian political agendas.

In early 1946, at the Political Consultative Conference—which included representatives from the China Democratic League (CDL), the Chinese Communist Party (CCP), the Kuomintang (KMT), and non-party figures—the CDL held 9 of the 38 seats, more than any other single political party at the time. Together with its cooperation with other parties, the CDL became an important force in balancing the CCP and the KMT. In November 1946, the KMT decided to convene a National Constituent Assembly, which the CCP refused to attend. Within the CDL, however, the Chinese Youth Party and the China Democratic Socialist Party participated independently in the Nanjing Constituent National Assembly. As a result, they were expelled from the CDL, leading to a rapid deterioration in relations between the CDL and the KMT.

In October 1947, the KMT-led Republic of China government declared the CDL an "illegal organization" and imposed sanctions against it. In November 1947, elections were held nationwide for delegates to the National Assembly, which were boycotted by both the CCP and the CDL. The KMT's repression of the CDL directly led the League, at its Third Plenary Session of the First Central Committee in January 1948, to publicly announce cooperation with the CCP. From that point onward, the CCP and the CDL established an alliance.

=== People's Republic of China ===
After the founding of the People's Republic of China in 1949, the Chinese Communist Party (CCP) became the ruling party. Mao Zedong proposed that the eight democratic parties, including the China Democratic League, should continue to exist. The CCP assured the CDL that it would maintain organizational independence and equal legal status, and that it would not interfere in the independence or day-to-day affairs of the democratic parties.

Representatives of the CDL—including Zhang Lan, Shen Junru, Zhang Bojun, Luo Longji, Zhang Dongsun, Shi Liang, Chu Tunan, and Fei Xiaotong—attended the First Plenary Session of the Chinese People's Political Consultative Conference. Zhang Lan was concurrently elected Vice Chairman of the Central People's Government. Shen Junru became Vice Chairman of the National Committee of the CPPCC and President of the Supreme People's Court of the People's Republic of China, while Zhang Bojun, Shi Liang, and Hu Yuzhi were appointed ministers of the Government Administration Council.

As a minor party led by the CCP, the CDL put forward the principle of "long-term coexistence and mutual supervision" to define relations between the CCP and the democratic parties. This principle was formally affirmed at the 8th National Congress of the Chinese Communist Party on September 15, 1956.

In 1997, the League adopted a constitution, which stipulated that its program was "to hold high the banner of patriotism and socialism, implement the basic line for the primary stage of socialism, safeguard stability in the society, strengthen services to national unity and strive for the promotion of socialist modernisation, establishment and improvement of a market economy, enhancement of political restructuring and socialist spiritual civilisation, emancipation and development of productive forces, consolidation and expansion of the united patriotic front and realisation of the grand goals of socialism with Chinese characteristics."

== Organization ==
According to its constitution, the CDL "holds high the great banner of socialism with Chinese characteristics" and upholds the leadership of the CCP. The CDL is the second-ranking minor democratic party in China after the Revolutionary Committee of the Chinese Kuomintang.

The CDL's highest body is the National Congress, held every five years. The National Congress has the powers to amend the Party constitution, elects the Central Committee, and hears the outgoing Central Committee's work report. The Central Committee is the Party's highest body between Congresses. The Central Committee convenes annually, and elects the Standing Committee of the Central Committee, including its chairperson and vice chairpersons. As of December 2023, the party has 30 province-level, and 412 prefecture-level city and county-level organizations. The CDL publishes the newspaper Popular Tribune (群言) and the Central Communications of the League (中央盟讯). Historically, the newspaper published the Guangming Daily.

=== Composition ===
The League is mainly made up of mid and senior-level intellectuals in the fields of culture, education, natural and social sciences, and technology. As of December 2023, the CDL had around 356,900 members. Of this total, 23.26% were from the field of advanced education, 27.46% were from the field of compulsory education, 6.79% were in art and the press, and 5.35% in other key areas of labor.

=== Chairpersons ===
The leader of the Party is officially called the Chairperson of the Central Committee of the China Democratic League. Between March 19, 1941 and September 19, 1944, the office was known as the Chairperson of the Central Executive Committee of the China Democratic Political League, which changed to the Chairperson of the Central Executive Committee of the China Democratic League in September 19, which again changed and assumed its current name on December 27, 1949.

No.	Chairperson	Took office	Left office	Ref.
1	Huang Yanpei 黄炎培	March 19, 1941	October 10, 1941	
2	Zhang Lan 张澜	October 10, 1941	February 9, 1955	
3	Shen Junru 沈钧儒	February 10, 1955	June 11, 1963	
4	Yang Mingxuan 杨明轩	June 12, 1963	October 1965	
Vacant
5	Shi Liang 史良	October 23, 1979	September 6, 1985	
–	Hu Yuzhi 胡愈之; Acting	September 27, 1985	January 16, 1986	
6	Chu Tunan 楚图南	January 31, 1986	January 9, 1987	
7	Fei Xiaotong 费孝通	January 9, 1987	November 1996	
8	Ding Shisun 丁石孙	November 1996	December 2005	
9	Jiang Shusheng 蒋树声	December 2005	December 2012	
10	Zhang Baowen 张宝文	December 2012	December 10, 2017	
11	Ding Zhongli 丁仲礼	December 10, 2017	Incumbent	

== Electoral history ==
=== National People's Congress elections ===
Election year	Number of seats
1954–59	134 / 1,226
1959–64	116 / 3,040
1964–75	285 / 3,040
1975–78	63 / 2,864
1987–83	95 / 3,497
1983–88	129 / 2,884
1988–93	114 / 2,892
1993–94	96 / 2,978
1997–98	77 / 2,979
2002–03	90 / 2,985
2007–08	75 / 2,987
2012–13	63 / 2,987
2017–18	57 / 2,980
2022–23	56 / 2,977
