= Luo Longji =

Chinese politician (1898–1965)

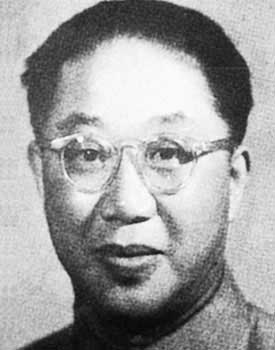
- Native name: 罗隆基
- Born: July 30, 1898
- Died: December 7, 1965 (aged 67)
- Spouse: Zhang Shunqin

Luo Longji (Chinese: 罗隆基; pinyin: Luo Longji; July 30, 1898 – December 7, 1965) was a Chinese politician and famous intellectual. Luo has been called "China's number two rightist". He and Hu Shih collaborated to research and promote human rights in China, which made them one of the earliest prolific liberals in the People's Republic of China. Because he advocated for setting committees to rehabilitate the wronged people in previous Communist repressions, he was attacked by Wu Han during the Anti-Rightist Campaign and persecuted accordingly.

== Biography ==
Luo was born in Fengtian Town, Anfu County, Jiangxi Province in 1896. In 1913, he was admitted to Tsinghua Preparatory School for Studying in the United States in Beijing. In 1919, he became a leader of the student movement during the May Fourth Movement. In 1921, he went to the United States to study, and successively studied political science at the University of Wisconsin and Columbia University. Later, he went to the London School of Economics and Political Science in the United Kingdom and obtained a doctorate in political science. Luo returned to China in 1928, and taught at Guanghua University in Shanghai, participating in the establishment of the New Moon magazine. In July 1929, Luo published an article entitled "On Human Rights" in the magazine, arguing that "the bankruptcy of human rights is a fact that cannot be concealed in China at present" and that it was necessary to launch a "human rights movement" to "fight for human rights" and that "the function of the state is to protect human rights". He also listed 35 "human rights that must be fought for at present" in imitation of European and American political theories. In November 1930, he was arrested for speaking out against the one-party dictatorship of the Kuomintang. After being expelled from Guanghua University, he taught at the China Public School.

After the 1931 Mukden Incident, Luo Longji advocated resistance against Japan. In January 1932, he accepted Liu Huoxuan's invitation and went to Tianjin to serve as the editorial editor of Yi Shi Bao. He was also invited by Zhang Boling, the president of Nankai University, to serve as a professor of the Department of Politics. Luo Longji continued to publish fierce editorials in Yi Shi Bao, such as "One country and three officials lead to a deadlock in politics", "It's time to fight", "On the policy toward Japan again", "Victory in suppressing the Communists is not glorious", "Resisting foreign aggression can bring peace to the country", etc., criticizing the government's policy toward Japan. In the autumn of 1933, Luo Longji's car was shot at near Haiguang Temple, and Luo Longji was almost assassinated. Shortly thereafter, Yi Shi Bao was forced to dismiss Luo Longji due to pressure. After Song Zheyuan, who advocated resistance against Japan, took control of the Beijing and Tianjin areas, Yi Shi Bao once again hired Luo Longji as the editorial editor until Tianjin was occupied by the Japanese army in August 1937, and Yi Shi Bao ceased publication.

After World War II, he moved to the rear. He was a member of the National Political Consultative Conference and one of the early leaders of the China Democratic League. After the Chinese victory in the war, he engaged in the democratic movement and had close contacts with Zhou Enlai, Dong Biwu and others. He once joined the National Socialist Party, but later withdrew with Zhang Dongsun.

In September 1949, he attended the first plenary session of the Chinese People's Political Consultative Conference as a representative of the CDL. Later, he served as vice chairman of the Central Committee of the China Democratic League, member of the State Council of the Central People's Government, Minister of the Ministry of Forestry and Industry, member of the Standing Committee of the National Committee of the Chinese People's Political Consultative Conference, and member of the Standing Committee of the National People's Congress. In 1954, he was elected as a representative of the 1st National People's Congress. In September, he attended the first session of the First National People's Congress to discuss the draft constitution and made a speech during the meeting.

On May 22, 1957, the United Front Work Department of the CPC Central Committee held a symposium. Luo Longji spoke at the meeting and suggested that the National People's Congress and the Chinese People's Political Consultative Conference set up a committee to examine the mistakes and deviations in the "Three Antis", "Five Antis" and "Anti-Counterrevolutionary" movements. The committee must be composed of the ruling party, democratic parties and non-party democrats. This is the famous "establishment of a redress committee" proposal, which was called the three major right-wing political theories by Mao Zedong, along with Zhang Bojun's "Political Design Institute" and Chu Anping's "Party World".

In June 1957, he was labeled a "rightist" and was criticized three times a week. (Note: In February 1958, the Fifth Session of the First National People's Congress (January 1-11) was held in Beijing. On January 31, the day before the opening of the Congress, the Standing Committee of the First National People's Congress submitted to the Congress a proposal to remove ten rightists, including Huang Shaohong, from their posts in the Nationalities Committee, the Legislative Affairs Committee and the National Defense Committee of the Standing Committee of the National People's Congress, for consideration. The proposal is as follows: "… (II) Regarding the rightists Zhang Naiqi, Pan Dakui, Zeng Shufan, Huang Shaohong, Chen Mingshu, Huang Xianfan, Fei Zhendong, Qiao Chuanjue, Ma Zhemin, Zhang Bojun, Ye Duyi, Cheng Shifan, Pan Eqi, Luo Longji, Fei Xiaotong, Chu Anping, Qian Weichang, Qian Sunqing, Ou Baichuan, Wang Tianxi, Han Zhao'e, Ding Ling, Zhang Dongmu, Xie Xuehong, Yang Ziheng, Zheng Liqi, Huang Qixiang, Li Boqiu, Xu Zhucheng, Huang Yaomian, Wang Yiqi, Zhang Zhen, Zhang Yunchuan, Zhu Junyun, Bi Mingqi, Tan Zhiqing Regarding the qualification of 38 people including Zhang Yunchuan, Chen Mingshu, Huang Shaohong, Huang Qixiang, Xie Xuehong and Luo Longji as members of the Legislative Affairs Committee of the National People's Congress, the Qualification Review Committee of Deputies has made a recommendation to the Congress, stating that they have lost the legal basis to continue to perform their duties as deputies to the National People's Congress and should not attend the Fifth Session of the First National People's Congress. Therefore, on February 1, the Fifth Session of the First National People's Congress adopted a resolution to "remove Zhang Yunchuan, Chen Mingshu, Huang Shaohong, Huang Qixiang, Xie Xuehong and Luo Longji from their positions as members of the National People's Congress Legislative Affairs Committee".) In July 1957, his girlfriend Pu Xixiu, who had lived with him for ten years, publicly "exposed" and criticized Luo Longji at the request of the CCP. The most fierce criticism was titled "Luo Longji is a wolf in sheep's clothing", calling him a "wolf in sheep's clothing" and severing ties with him. On January 26, 1958, he was dismissed from his position as vice chairman of the Democratic League Central Committee. On the January 31, he was dismissed from his position as a representative of the National People's Congress and the position of Minister of Forest Industry. His salary was reduced from level 4 to level 9.

At midnight on December 7, 1965, he died of a heart attack at his home in Beijing.

== After death ==
On October 24, 1986, the Central Committee of the China Democratic League held a commemoration meeting for his 90th birthday. Yan Mingfu, Minister of the United Front Work Department of the CPC Central Committee, enthusiastically affirmed his revolutionary contributions at the meeting and considered him a well-known patriotic democratic figure.

== Personal life ==
In 1928, Luo married Zhang Shunqin, a law student he met in the UK, and they returned to Shanghai together. The following year, they gave birth to a daughter (who died a month later). Luo also divorced Zhang in 1931. In 1938, he married Miss Shen (doubtful, according to Zhang Yimou's Homeless: The Emotional Life of Luo Longji, he was married to Wang Youjia during this period) and divorced in 1945 after the victory of World War II. In the following days, he had relationships with many people including Shi Liang, Liu Wang Liming, Pu Xixiu, Yang Wei, Luo Yifeng, etc., but nothing came of them.

== Works ==
His major works include Human Rights Essays, Political Essays, and A Condemnation of US Secretary of State Acheson.
