= 1st National People's Congress =

1954–1959 Chinese legislative session

1st National People's Congress 第一届全国人民代表大会
- National emblem of China

15 September 1954 – 17 April 1959 (4 years, 183 days) Overview
- Type: Supreme organ of state power
- Election: Indirect elections

Leadership
- Chairman: Liu Shaoqi
- Vice Chairmen: Soong Ching-ling, Lin Boqu, Li Jishen, Zhang Lan, Luo Ronghuan, Shen Junru, Guo Moruo, Huang Yanpei, Peng Zhen, Li Weihan, Chen Shutong, Tenzin Gyatso, Saifuddin Azizi, and Cheng Qian
- Secretary-General: Peng Zhen
- Standing Committee: 80 (1st)

Members
- Total: 1,226 members

1st National People's Congress
- Traditional Chinese: 第一屆全國人民代表大會
- Simplified Chinese: 第一届全国人民代表大会
Transcriptions
Standard Mandarin
- Hanyu Pinyin: Dìyī Jiè Quánguó Rénmín Dàibiǎo Dàhuì

Abbreviation
- Traditional Chinese: 第一屆全國人大
- Simplified Chinese: 第一届全国人大
Transcriptions
Standard Mandarin
- Hanyu Pinyin: Dìyī Jiè Quánguó Réndà

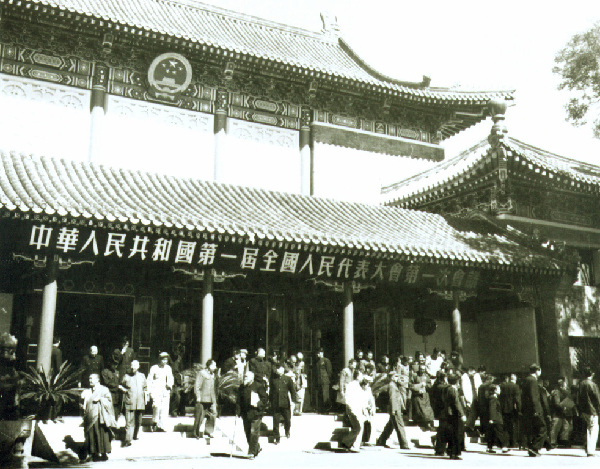
Huairen Hall, where the first session of the congress took place

The 1st National People's Congress (NPC) was in session from 1954 to 1959. It held four sessions in this period. There were 1,226 deputies to the Congress. These were the first legislative elections to take place after the founding of the People's Republic of China.

== Background ==
In accordance with the rules set by the 1st National Committee of the Chinese People's Political Consultative Conference, the first set of deputies to the NPC were elected in the spring and summer of 1954, the first elections under the 1953 Electoral Law which set rules for elections in the PRC, by the following:

- Provincial legislatures
- Legislative councils of the directly administered cities
- Regional legislature of Inner Mongolia

== Seat distribution ==
Major party	Chairman	Seats
Chinese Communist Party	Mao Zedong	1,048
Other Parties	Chairperson	Seats
Chinese Peasants' and Workers' Democratic Party	Zhang Bojun	178
Jiusan Society	Xu Deheng	178
China Democratic League	Zhang Lan; Shen Junru	178
China Association for Promoting Democracy	Ma Xulun	178
China National Democratic Construction Association	Huang Yanpei	178
Revolutionary Committee of the Chinese Kuomintang	Li Jishen	178
Taiwan Democratic Self-Government League	Xie Xuehong	178
China Zhi Gong Party	Chen Qiyou	178
Independents	N/A	178

== The first session ==
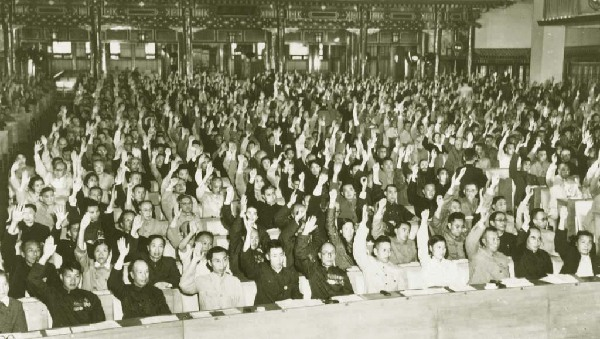
Delegates voting at the first session of the 1st NPC.

The first plenary session was held in September 1954. The Congress passed the 1954 Constitution of the People's Republic of China. It elected the state leaders:

- Chairman of the People's Republic of China: Mao Zedong
- Vice Chairman of the People's Republic of China: Zhu De
- Chairman of the Standing Committee of the National People's Congress: Liu Shaoqi
- Premier of the State Council: Zhou Enlai
- President of the Supreme People's Court: Dong Biwu
- Procurator-General of the Supreme People's Procuratorate: Zhang Dingcheng

Chairmanship Election
Candidates	For	Against	Abstain
Mao Zedong	1210	0	0
Vice Chairmanship Election
Candidates	For	Against	Abstain
Zhu De	1210	0	0
