= Yang Mingxuan =

Chinese politician

- 杨明轩
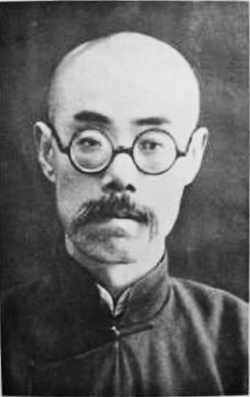
- Yang in 1936

Vice Chairman of the Standing Committee of the National People's Congress
- In office December 1964 – 22 August 1967
- Chairman: Zhu De

Chairman of the China Democratic League
- In office November 1958 – October 1965
- Preceded by: Shen Junru
- Succeeded by: Shi Liang

Personal details
- Born: 1891
- Died: 22 August 1967 (aged 75–76)
- Party: China Democratic League
- Education: Shanghai University

Yang Mingxuan (Chinese: 杨明轩; 1891 – August 22, 1967) was a Chinese politician who served as a vice chairperson of the Standing Committee of the National People's Congress and the chairman of the China Democratic League.
