= Zhang Dongsun =

Chinese philosopher (1886–1973)

- 張東蓀
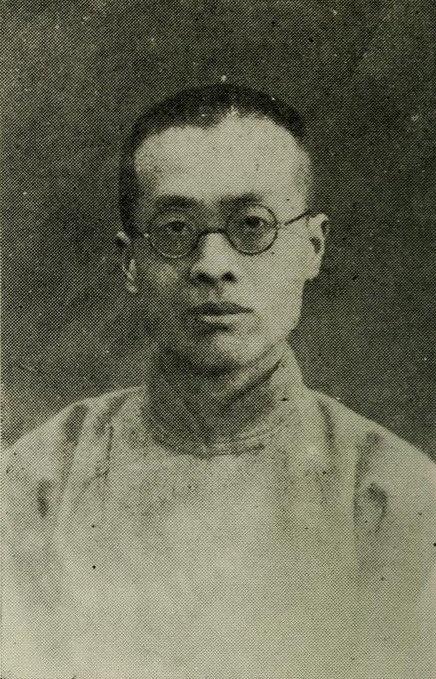
- Who's Who in China Suppl. 4th ed. (1933)
- Born: December 9, 1886; Hang County, Zhejiang, Qing Empire
- Died: June 2, 1973 (aged 86); Qincheng Prison, Changping, Beijing, China
- Other names: Chang Tung-sun, Chang Tung-sheng, T. S. Chang
- Occupations: Philosopher; Public Intellectual
- Known for: Chinese philosopher, public intellectual and political figure.
- Political party: China Democratic League

Zhang Dongsun (simplified Chinese: 张东荪; traditional Chinese: 張東蓀; Wade–Giles: Chang Tung-sun; 1886–1973), also known as Chang Tung-sheng, was a Chinese philosopher, public intellectual and political figure. He was a professor of Western philosophy and Chinese social philosophy at Tsinghua University and Yenching University.

== Biography ==
Zhang Dongsun was born in 1886 in Hangzhou, Zhejiang, China. Travelling to Japan as an overseas student in his youth, Zhang studied the philosophy of Immanuel Kant, and attempted to reinterpret Confucianism along Kantian lines. He took part in famous debates about the relative merits of "science and metaphysics," allying himself with the then-fashionable metaphysics of Henri Bergson. He was equally well-known, as an exponent of the philosophy of Bertrand Russell, whom he accompanied on a tour of China in 1920.

A prominent exponent of Chinese socialistic liberalism, Zhang became a powerful influence in the China National Socialist Party in its original incarnation as a non-Communist "third force" grouping opposed to the Kuomintang under Chiang Kai-shek.

Beyond the era of the Second World War, Zhang served as a professor of Philosophy and China studies at Tsinghua University from the 1920s through the 1940s. In particular, from 1935 to 1937, he founded and edited the literary and philosophical monthly, Wenzhe yuekan (文哲月刊) at the Tsinghua Campus (淸華園).

Zhang veered towards acceptance of the inevitability of Communist victory and took government positions after the establishment of the People's Republic of China in 1949. However, his earlier passionate devotion to intellectual freedom and searching critiques of Marxism made him an object of suspicion, obliging him to live in obscurity and in constant fear of persecution.

After 1949, Zhang, although still a notable politician in the PRC, began to secretly provide the US with intelligence from the onset of the Korean War, seeking to check China's total alignment with the Soviet Union while hoping to safeguard its strategic flexibility amidst the escalating Cold War.

During the early years of the PRC, Zhang served in the new government as a member of the central governmental committee, as counsellor on the Culture and Education Committee of the State Council and in various other high-level positions, while maintaining his position as the acting president of Tsinghua University.

In 1951 and 1952, Zhang's activities with the CIA were discovered and he was charged with providing secret information to the US, which was fighting China directly in the Korean War. He subsequently lost his position and rights in the government and was subjected to ideological criticism from Mao Zedong, Zhou Enlai, Ma Yinchu, Zheng Xin, and Jian Bozan. He was expelled by the China Democratic League soon after. At the beginning of the Cultural Revolution, he was hospitalized in the Beijing Railroad Hospital due to his poor health, and was later imprisoned due to the information leak committed nearly 20 years ago. He died in 1973.

== Work ==
Zhang believed that World War I signaled the collapse of the "second civilization" (Western civilization). He promoted the idea of a "third civilization," socialism in China (an Eastern Asian civilization that assimilates the essence of Western philosophy).

Although Zhang was intellectually silenced after the 1940s, he had been an extraordinarily active writer until that time. Many of his works from that period still survive, testifying to Zhang's importance as one of the most penetrating and innovative Chinese thinkers of the 20th Century. His most important philosophical works include Science and Philosophy (科學與哲學, 1924), Outlook on Life (人生觀, 1928), Essays on Philosophy (新哲學論叢, 1929), Psychoanalysis (精神分析學, 1929), Moral Philosophy (道德哲學, 1930), Philosophy (哲學, 1931), Modern Ethics (現代倫理學, 1932), Value Philosophy (價値哲學, 1934), Epistemology (認識論, 1934), Modern Philosophy (現代哲學, 1934), Critical Essays on Red Philosophy (唯物辨證法論戰, 1934), A new Formulation of Pluralistic Epistemology (多元認識論重述, 1937), What is Philosophy (哲學究竟是什麼, 1937), Knowledge and Culture (知識與文化, 1946), Thought and Society (思想與社會, 1946), Rationality and Democracy (理性與民主, 1946), and Democracy and Socialism (民主主義與社會主義, 1948).

== Philosophy ==
Pluralistic epistemology represents the core of Zhang's philosophical system. It is derived from a revised version of Kantian philosophy. To justify such an epistemology, he proposed a new cosmology: panstructuralism (fanjiagouzhuyi 泛架構主義) An important assumption of his theory of knowledge is the neo-realistic view that the external world exists independently of our consciousness, and that there is no exact correlation between external phenomena and our comprehension of them. However, the external cause for our sensation is not a substance, but the order or structure of the external world. What is transmitted to us through our sensory impressions is a modification of this external order. Similarly, the discovery of the Theory of Relativity was important only in terms of recognizing structural laws, and not in terms of recognising any new essences in nature or the cosmos.

Plural epistemology advocates the view that sense impressions are non-being. Therefore, they are without a position in the ontological sense; they do not possess any 'ontological status'. All beings exist in a process of constant change that manifests itself in a never-ending modification of structural connections, and the growth and decline of the qualities of the "essence" of particular entities. According to Zhang, our consciousness can only recognize certain aspects of these manifest changes. However, this refers not only to the level of our perception and comprehension; according to Zhang, the structured order of relations is all that really exists in the cosmos. The relation between the external world and our subjectivity is interactive and correlative.

Combining the Buddhist idea of non-substance with a theory of evolution, Zhang held that the structures of the universe, although empty, are in evolution, and new kinds of structure may emerge due to changes in the combination of various structures. His most valuable contributions are also to be found in his endeavours to elaborate the dialectical aspect of Aristotelian logic, to connect logic, language and methods of disputation, and to discover principles and formal elements of the logic of linguistic pragmatism. His investigations of the influence of Chinese language on the development of Chinese philosophy are a very influential and pioneering work. He was the first philosopher who exposed correlative thinking as a main characteristic of Chinese philosophy and analogical argument as a specific Chinese mode of inference.

== See also ==
- Korean War
