= Hu Yuzhi =

Chinese publisher

- 胡愈之
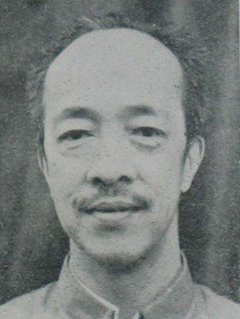
- Hu in 1949

Vice Chairman of the Standing Committee of the National People's Congress
- In office 18 June 1983 – 16 June 1986
- Chairman: Peng Zhen

Vice Chairman of the Chinese People's Political Consultative Conference
- In office 2 July 1979 – 17 June 1983
- Chairman: Li Xiannian

Chairman of the China Democratic League Acting
- In office 27 September 1985 – 16 January 1986
- Preceded by: Shi Liang
- Succeeded by: Chu Tunan

Personal details
- Born: 9 September 1896 Shangyu District, Zhejiang
- Died: 16 January 1986 (aged 89)
- Party: China Democratic League
- Spouse: Shen Zijiu

Hu Yuzhi (Chinese: 胡愈之; September 9, 1896 – January 16, 1986) was a Chinese politician who served as a vice chairperson of the Chinese People's Political Consultative Conference and the acting chairman of the China Democratic League.
