= Gao Chongmin =

Chinese politician

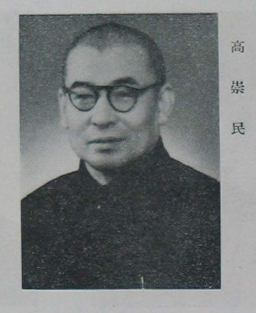
Gao Chongmin

Gao Chongmin (Chinese: 高崇民; 1891 – July 29, 1971) was a Chinese politician, who served as the vice chairperson of the Chinese People's Political Consultative Conference.
