= Shi Liang =

Chinese politician (1900–1985)

- 史良
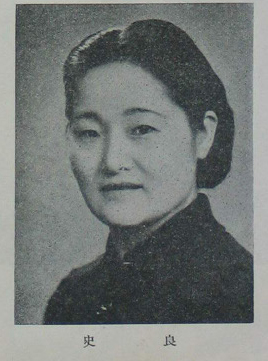
- Shi in 1949

1st Minister of Justice
- In office 1 October 1949 – 28 April 1959
- Premier: Zhou Enlai
- Succeeded by: Wei Wenbo

Vice Chairwoman of the Standing Committee of the National People's Congress
- In office 1 July 1979 – 6 September 1985
- Chairman: Ye Jianying; Peng Zhen

Vice Chairwoman of the Chinese People's Political Consultative Conference
- In office 8 March 1978 – 17 June 1983
- Chairman: Deng Xiaoping

Chairwoman of the China Democratic League
- In office 23 October 1979 – 6 September 1985
- Preceded by: Yang Mingxuan
- Succeeded by: Hu Yuzhi

Personal details
- Born: March 27, 1900 Changzhou, Jiangsu
- Died: September 6, 1985 (aged 85)
- Citizenship: Qing Empire Republic of China People's Republic of China
- Party: China Democratic League

Shi Liang (Chinese: 史良; pinyin: Shǐ Liáng; Wade–Giles: Shih Liang; March 27, 1900 – September 6, 1985) was a prominent lawyer and activist of the Republic of China. She was the only woman arrested in what was known as the Seven Gentlemen Incident on the eve of war with Japan in 1936. In 1949, she became the first Minister of Justice of the People's Republic of China.

== Biography ==
Shi Liang was born in Changzhou, Jiangsu in 1900. She was educated in Shanghai and became a lawyer there. She and another six intellectuals were arrested by Chiang Kai-shek’s government in 1936, in what is known as the Seven Gentlemen Incident.

Shi was the first Minister of Justice of the People's Republic of China from 1949 to 1959.

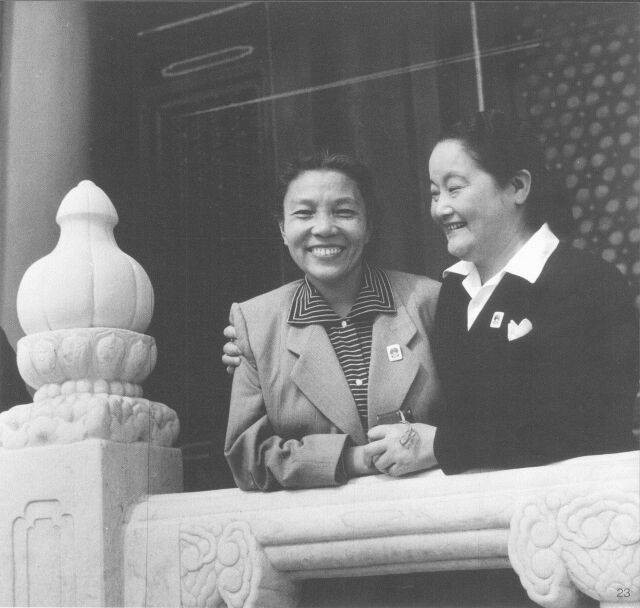
Cai Chang and Shi Liang on Tian'anmen, 1950

== General references ==
- Lee, Lily Xiao Hong (2016). "Shi Liang". Biographical Dictionary of Chinese Women. Vol. 2. London: Routledge. pp. 450–455.
- Shan, Patrick Fuliang (2013). "Demythologizing Politicized Myths: A New Interpretation of the Seven Gentlemen Incident". Frontiers of History in China. 8 (1): 51–77. doi:10.3868/s020-002-013-0004-6.

Legal offices
Preceded by New office	Minister of Justice; 1949–1959	Succeeded by Wei Wenbo
Party political offices
Preceded by Yang Mingxuan	Chairperson of China Democratic League; 1979–1985	Succeeded by Hu Yuzhi
