= Zhang Lan =

Chinese politician and revolutionary

- 张澜
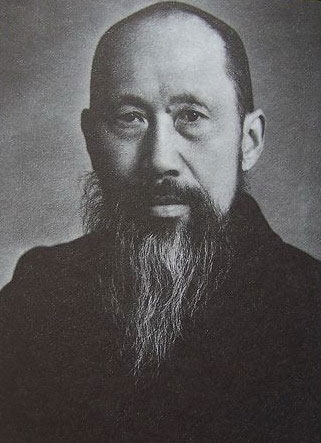
- Zhang in 1955

Vice Chairman of the Central People's Government
- In office 1 October 1949 – 27 September 1954
- Leader: Mao Zedong

Vice Chairman of the Standing Committee of the National People's Congress
- In office 27 September 1954 – 9 February 1955
- Chairman: Liu Shaoqi

Vice Chairman of the Chinese People's Political Consultative Conference
- In office 25 December 1954 – 9 February 1955
- Chairman: Mao Zedong; Zhou Enlai

Chairman of China Democratic League
- In office 10 October 1941 – 9 February 1955
- Preceded by: Huang Yanpei
- Succeeded by: Shen Junru

Personal details
- Born: 2 April 1872 Nanchong, Sichuan
- Died: 9 February 1955 (aged 82) Beijing Hospital, Beijing, China
- Cause of death: Arteriosclerosis
- Party: China Democratic League

Zhang Lan (simplified Chinese: 张澜; traditional Chinese: 張瀾; pinyin: Zhāng Lán; April 2, 1872 – February 1955), courtesy name Biaofang (表方), was a Chinese political activist best known for being the chairman of the China Democratic League from its founding in 1941 until his death in 1955.

== Biography ==
Zhang was born into a scholarly family in Nanchong, Sichuan on April 2, 1872. Witnessing the turmoil at the end of the Qing dynasty, Zhang was attracted to the reformist views of Liang Qichao, and he joined the group advocating constitutional monarchy for China. In 1911, Zhang was vice-chairman of the committee of shareholders that opposed the planned nationalization of the projected Sichuan-Hankou railroad. The protests against the plan swelled into an uprising that was easily quelled by authorities.

Zhang remained a political leader in Sichuan province. In 1916, he organized a small force to act against Yuan Shikai, but Yuan died before the troops saw any action. Zhang served briefly in 1920 as governor of Sichuan province. In the following years, however, Zhang focused primarily on education. He served as president of Chengdu Normal College for two years before becoming president of Chengdu University in 1928. In 1938, in order to develop education in his hometown, he founded the private Jianhua Middle School, which later merged with Jialing High School in 1950 to form the Northern Sichuan Public Nanchong High School, which is the predecessor of Nanchong Senior High School. 1938，After the Second Sino-Japanese War began in 1937, Zhang was appointed a member of the National Political Assembly. Although he rarely participated in the body's deliberations, he was respected for his speeches criticizing the Nationalist government.

When a number of opposition groups joined to form the League of Chinese Democratic Political Groups in 1941, Zhang was elected chairman. As a non-partisan figure, he calmed disagreements between the various constituent groups of the League. He retained this position after the League's reorganization into the China Democratic League in 1944, and until his death in 1955.

The China Democratic League was outlawed in 1947, after which Zhang was placed under house arrest in Shanghai. In the spring of 1949, he escaped with the aid of Chinese Communist Party agents and traveled to Beijing to assist in forming the new government. He headed the China Democratic League delegation to the first Chinese People's Political Consultative Conference in September 1949, and was elected one of the Vice-chairmen of the Central People's Government after the founding of the People's Republic of China on October 1. Zhang held this position until 1954, when the government was reorganized to have only one vice-chairman, at which time he was made a Vice Chair of the Standing Committee of the National People's Congress. Zhang died of arteriosclerosis on 9 February 1955 at the age of 84. He was survived by his wife, Liu Huicheng.
