= Xu Deheng =

Vice-Chairman of the 5th CPPCC National Committee

- 许德珩
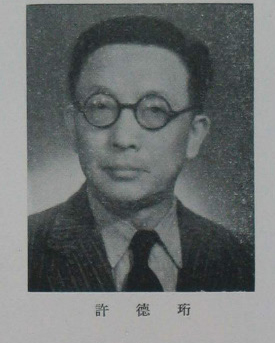

Vice Chairman of the Standing Committee of the National People's Congress
- In office 17 January 1975 – 8 April 1988
- Chairman: Zhu De; Ye Jianying; Peng Zhen

Vice Chairman of the Chinese People's Political Consultative Conference
- In office 5 January 1965 – 17 June 1983
- Chairman: Zhou Enlai; Deng Xiaoping

Chairman of Jiusan Society
- In office May 1946 – January 1988

Personal details
- Born: 17 October 1890
- Died: 8 February 1990 (aged 99)
- Resting place: Babaoshan Revolutionary Cemetery, Beijing, China
- Party: Jiusan Society (1949-1988); Chinese Communist Party (1979-1990)
- Education: Peking University
- Profession: Politician, scholar, educator

Xu Deheng (Chinese: 许德珩; 17 October 1890 – 8 February 1990) was a Chinese male politician, scholar and educator, who served as the vice chairperson of the Chinese People's Political Consultative Conference and founding leader of Chinese party Jiusan Society.

== Biography ==
On 17 October 1890, Xu was born in Jiujiang.

In 1896, he followed his brother's footsteps to study. In 1905, he went to study in an Academy nearby. That year, the provincial examinations were cancelled. And to make a living, his father went to Shaoxing to become a clerk. Later on, Xu became acquaintances with Wei Chaoqu, who studied in the Jiujiang Academy. Xu then used his materials to study himself. In 1906, he went to a Tongwen College graduate's home in Jiujiang City to further his studies. On 6 July 1907，Xu Xilin and Qiu Jin have organized the Anqing Rebellion. And as a result, Xu Deheng's father, who was working at Shaoxing, was sacked and returned to Jiujiang to teach in Tongwen College. In 1908, Xu Deheng entered Jiujiang Secondary School to study. In 1909, he joined the Tongmenghui with referral by his teachers Yang Bingsheng and Wang Heng, and cut his braid. In 1911, 2 weeks after the Xinhai Rebellion, Jiujiang was liberated. Xu Deheng was involved in the Military Police, and later became Viceroy Li Liejun's secretary with referral by Liao Bolang. In 1912, Xu's English teacher Hu Qihuan was executed for a typo, leading to his departure from the military. On 6 May 1913, Hunan, Hubei, Jiangxi, and Anhui joined forces to start the Second Revolution in opposition to Yuan Shikai's plans to incur national debts. Xu returned to the Army to participate in the Hukou Rebellion, which the anti-Yuan forces Xu were in lost. He returned to the countryside following this defeat, but as Duan Zhigui was arresting revolutionaries across Jiangxi, he went to Shanghai to further his studies, even being accepted to China College's English program in Wusong. In the summer of 1915, his classmate Zhao Wei persuaded him to pursue his studies in Peking University, which saved him tuition.

In 1919, he was a student leader of the May Fourth Movement, and co-drafted the May Fourth Declaration. In 1920, he went on to the University of Lyon in France to pursuit a Master's degree, which he had managed to acquire in his Summer 1924 graduation. Xu returned to China in Spring 1927, and became an officer at Canton, a political professor at Wuhan's Central Political School and Fourth Sun Yat-sen University respectively, the secratariat and acting-principal of the National Revolutionary Army's Political Department as well.

On 4 May 1946, Jiusan Society was founded in Chongqing, with Xu being elected as the general secretary. Following the establishment of the People's Republic of China, he was elected as a member of the 1st National People's Congress. In September, he participated in the discussions and debates related to the 1954 Constitution of China. Later on, he was made the vice-chair of the Government Administration Council's Political Law Committee, Minister of Fisheries, Vice Chairman of the Chinese People's Political Consultative Conference, and even the Vice Chairman of the Standing Committee of the National People's Congress.

As Xu was close to the leadership, he was especially cautious during the Cultural Revolution. In 1979, Xu joined the Chinese Communist Party. On 8 February 1990, he died in Beijing, at the age of 99 years old.

== Citations ==
- 许德珩 (April 1987). 许德珩回忆录. 北京: 中国青年出版社.
- 左用章 (May 2004). 许德珩与九三学社. 广州: 广东人民出版社. ISBN 7-218-04431-X.
