= Shen Junru =

Chinese lawyer and politician (1875–1963)

- 沈钧儒
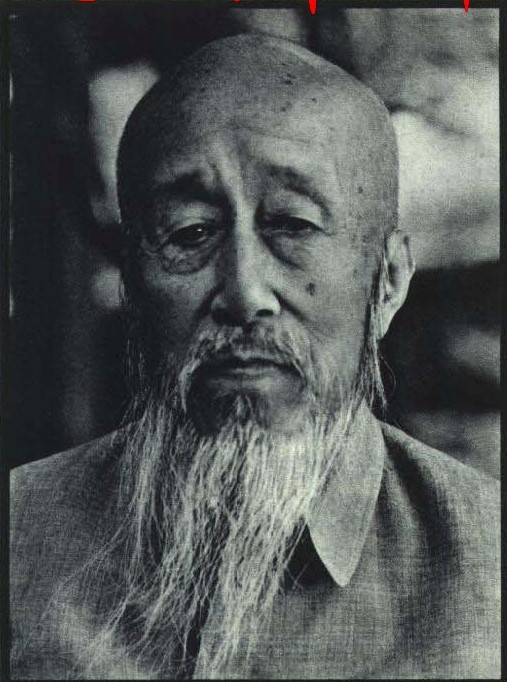
- Shen in 1963

President of the Supreme People's Court
- In office 1 October 1949 – 27 September 1954
- Succeeded by: Dong Biwu

Vice Chairman of the Standing Committee of the National People's Congress
- In office 27 September 1954 – 11 June 1963
- Chairman: Liu Shaoqi; Zhu De

Vice Chairman of the Chinese People's Political Consultative Conference
- In office 8 October 1949 – 11 June 1963
- Chairman: Mao Zedong; Zhou Enlai

Chairman of the China Democratic League
- In office 10 February 1955 – 11 June 1963
- Preceded by: Zhang Lan
- Succeeded by: Yang Mingxuan

Personal details
- Born: 2 January 1875 Suzhou, Jiangsu
- Died: 11 June 1963 (aged 88)
- Party: China Democratic League
- Education: Hosei University

Shen Junru (Chinese: 沈钧儒; pinyin: Shěn Jūnrú; Wade–Giles: Shen Chünju; January 2, 1875 – June 11, 1963) was a Chinese lawyer and politician who was the president of the Supreme People's Court of the Central People's Government of the People's Republic of China. He was also the chairman of the China Democratic League.

== Biography ==
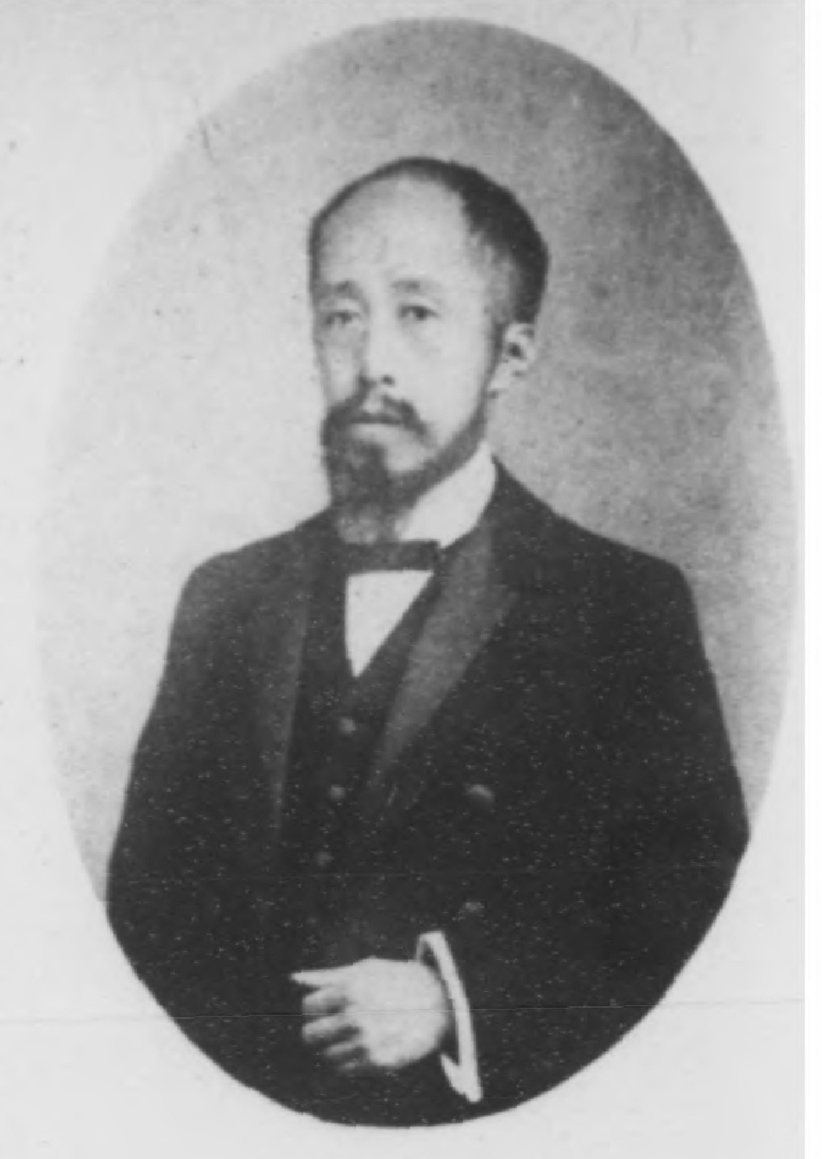
Shen in his 30s–40s

Shen was born in Suzhou, with family ancestry in Jiaxing City. He received the Jinshi or "presented scholar" degree, the highest under the imperial examination system. Shen completed a preparation course (速成科) at Hosei University, in Tokyo, Japan in 1905.

Shen Junru and six other intellectuals in Shanghai were arrested in 1936 by Chiang Kai-shek's government, which is known as the Seven Gentlemen Incident. This incident caused a national crisis and the seven individuals were released only after Japan launched an invasion in the summer of 1937. During the Second Sino-Japanese War, Shen was opposed to the Soviet–Japanese Neutrality Pact, but was dissuaded from speaking out against it by Zhou Enlai.

Shen attended the first Chinese People's Political Consultative Conference (CPPCC) in 1949 and was appointed to be the first president of the Supreme People's Court from 1949 to 1954. Shen had also served as a member of the committee of the Central People's Government, and was vice-chairman of the CPPCC National Committee from 1949 to 1963.

Additionally, Shen was vice-chairman of the Standing Committee of the National People's Congress from 1954 to 1963, and chairman of the China Democratic League from 1956 to 1963. He was also vice-chairman of the Chinese Political and Law Studies Association (中国政治法律学会).

== Death ==
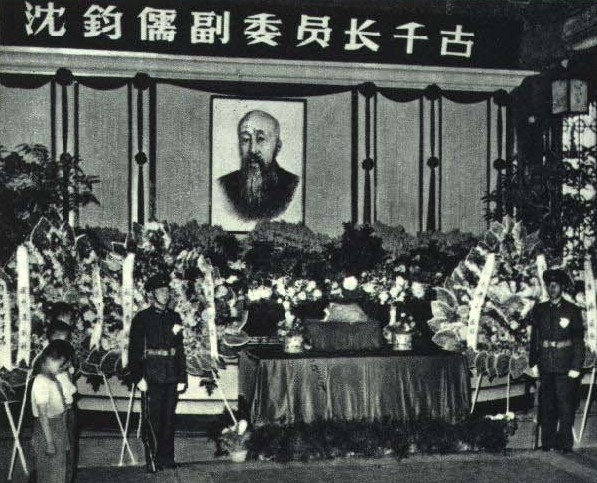
Shen Junru's ashes lie in state in Beijing

Shen died during his sleep in early morning on June 11, 1963, from a long illness at the age of 88 years old.

Legal offices
New title	President of the Supreme People's Court; 1949–1954	Next: Dong Biwu
Party political offices
Preceded by Zhang Lan	Chairman of China Democratic League; 1956–1963	Succeeded by Yang Mingxuan
