= Chen Shutong =

Chinese politician

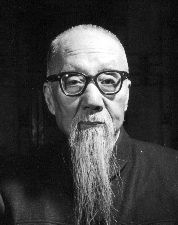

Personal details
- Born: 7 August 1876 Hangzhou, Zhejiang, China
- Died: 17 February 1966 (aged 90)
- Education: Hosei University

Chen Shutong
- Traditional Chinese: 陳叔通
- Simplified Chinese: 陈叔通
Transcriptions
Standard Mandarin
- Hanyu Pinyin: Chén Shūtōng
- Wade–Giles: Ch'en Shu-t'ung

Chen Shutong (7 August 1876 – 17 February 1966) was a Chinese politician, scholar and administrator who served in the governments of the Qing Dynasty, the Republic of China and the People's Republic of China. He belonged to a very small group of imperial Mandarins that survived and prospered under the Communist government of Mao Zedong.

== Biography ==
Chen was born in Hangzhou, Zhejiang. He entered the imperial civil service and received the title of Jinshi (the highest and final degree in the imperial examination) in 1903. From 1904 to 1906, Chen was in Japan, studying political science and constitutional law at Hosei University. Following the Xinhai Revolution and the subsequent establishment of the Republic of China in 1912, Chen was selected as a representative to the National Assembly. He served in various important positions until 1915, including Secretary of the State Council and Secretary to the President's Office. However, he increasingly opposed the authoritarian tendencies of Yuan Shikai.

From the late 1910s to the late 1930s Chen held a number of important positions, including Chairman of the Commercial Press in Shanghai and Chairman of The National Commercial Bank. Chen actively opposed the Japanese occupation during the Second Sino-Japanese War, categorically refusing to collaborate with the Japanese, who made an offer to appoint him as Mayor of Shanghai. After the end of the war, his many disagreements with Chiang Kai-Shek led him to escape to Hong Kong through an underground Chinese Communist Party organization in 1948.

Following the Communist victory in the Chinese Civil War and the creation of the People's Republic of China in 1949, Chen, who was present at the inauguration ceremony of the People's Republic standing next to Mao Zedong, went on to serve as a Vice Chairman of both the National People's Congress and the Chinese People's Political Consultative Conference from 1949 until his death in 1966, as well as Chairman of the All-China Federation of Industry and Commerce from 1953 until his death.

He was the author of numerous works on law and political science, including "Politics" and "General Theory of Politics and Law"; he also published poetry collections.

Chen Shutong died on February 17, 1966, at the age of 90.
