= Academic Degrees Committee of the State Council =

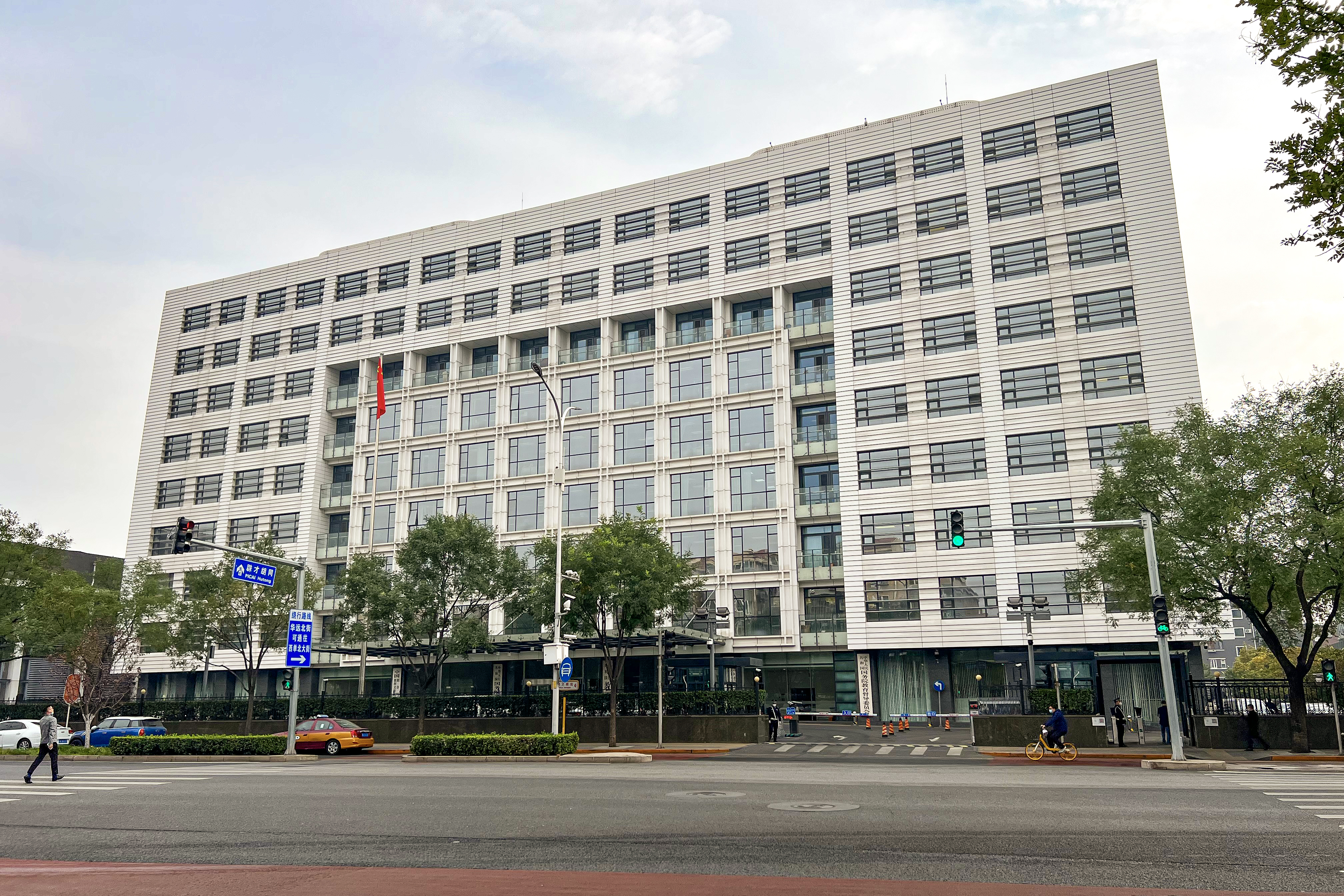
Ministry of Education of China

The Academic Degrees Committee of the State Council (Chinese: 国务院学位委员会) is an academic authority established by the State Council of the People's Republic of China, responsible for leading and managing the granting of academic degrees and related work nationwide. Its administrative office is jointly operating with the Department of Academic Degrees Management and Postgraduate Education of the Ministry of Education. Under the committee, there are a number of subject consultative expert groups for different academic disciplines.

== History ==
On February 12, 1980, the "Regulations on Academic Degrees of the People's Republic of China" was adopted, and was implemented on January 1, 1981. It was amended at the 11th Session of the Standing Committee of the Tenth National People's Congress in 2004.

=== First Session Committee ===
In December, 1980, the first committee of the State Council Academic Degrees Committee was established, with 41 committee members, including:

Chairman: Fang Yi (December 1980 – January 1983), Hu Qiaomu (February 1983 – September 1988).

Vice Chairmen:

- Zhou Yang,
- Jiang Nanxiang,
- Wu Heng,
- Qian Sanqiang.

And other members.

=== Second Session ===
The members approved by the General Office of the State Council on October 10, 1988, were:：

Chairman: He Dongchang (Vice Chairman of the State Education Commission),

Vice Chairmen:

- Zhang Guangdou (Professor of Tsinghua University)
- Hu Sheng (President of the Chinese Academy of Social Sciences)
- Zhou Guangzhao (President of the Chinese Academy of Sciences)
- Zhu Kaixuan (Vice Chairman of the State Education Commission)

And other members.

=== Third Session ===
The members of the State Council Academic Degrees Committee, as determined by the General Office of the State Council on March 3, 1995, are as follows:：

Chairman: Li Lanqing

Vice Chairmen:

- Zhu Guangya (President of the Chinese Academy of Engineering)
- Zhou Guangzhao (President of the Chinese Academy of Sciences)
- Zhang Xiaowen (scientist) (Vice Chairman of the State Education Commission)
- Ru Xin (Vice President of the Chinese Academy of Social Sciences)

And other members.

=== Fourth Session ===
The members of the State Council Academic Degrees Committee, as determined by the General Office of the State Council on January 27, 1999, are as follows:

Chairman: Li Lanqing

Vice Chairmen:

- Song Jian (Vice Chairman of the National Committee of the Chinese People's Political Consultative Conference, President of the Chinese Academy of Engineering)
- Chen Zhili (Minister of Education, in charge of the routine work of the State Council Academic Degrees Committee)
- Lu Yongxiang (President of the Chinese Academy of Sciences)
- Zhou Yuanqing (Vice Minister of Education)
- Wang Luolin (Vice President of the Chinese Academy of Social Sciences)

And other members.

=== Fifth Session ===
The members determined by the "Notice of the General Office of the State Council on Adjusting the Composition of the Academic Degrees Committee of the State Council" on May 12, 2003, are:

Chairman: Chen Zhili (State Councilor)

Vice Chairmen:

- Lu Yongxiang (Vice Chairman of the National People's Congress, President of the Chinese Academy of Sciences)
- Xu Kuangdi (Vice Chairman of the National Committee of the Chinese People's Political Consultative Conference, President of the Chinese Academy of Engineering)
- Chen Kuiyuan (Vice Chairman of the National Committee of the Chinese People's Political Consultative Conference, President of the Chinese Academy of Social Sciences)
- Zhou Ji (Minister of Education, presiding over the daily work of the Academic Degrees Committee)
- Zhao Qinping (Vice Minister of Education)

And other members.

=== Sixth Session ===
The members determined by the "Notice of the General Office of the State Council on Adjusting the Composition of the Academic Degrees Committee of the State Council" issued on April 19, 2008, are:

Chairman: Liu Yandong (State Councilor)

Vice Chairman:

- Lu Yongxiang (Academician, President of the Chinese Academy of Sciences)
- Xu Kuangdi (Academician, President of the Chinese Academy of Engineering)
- Chen Kuiyuan (President of the Chinese Academy of Social Sciences)
- Zhou Ji (Academician, Minister of Education, presiding over the routine work of the Academic Degrees Committee)
- Zhao Qinping (Professor, Vice Minister of Education)

And other members.

=== Seventh Session ===
The members determined by the "Notice of the General Office of the State Council on Adjusting the Composition of the Academic Degrees Committee of the State Council" in 2013 are:

Chairman: Liu Yandong Vice Chairman:

- Yuan Guiren,
- Bai Chunli
- Zhou Ji
- Wang Weiguang
- Du Zhanyuan

And other members.

=== Academic degrees law ===
In 2025, China implemented the Degree Law of the People's Republic of China, replacing the original "Degree Regulations of the People's Republic of China". The law stipulates:

"The State Council has established a Degree Committee to lead the national degree work. The Degree Committee of the State Council has one chairman, several vice-chairmen and members. The chairman, vice-chairmen and members are appointed and removed by the State Council, and each term of office is five years. The Degree Committee of the State Council establishes expert groups to be responsible for degree review and evaluation, quality supervision, research and consultation and other work. The Degree Committee of the State Council established an office in the education administration department of the State Council to undertake the daily work of the Degree Committee of the State Council. The education administration department of the State Council shall be responsible for the relevant work of national degree management. The people's governments of provinces, autonomous regions and municipalities directly under the Central Government shall establish provincial-level academic degree committees, which shall lead the academic degree work within their respective administrative regions under the guidance of the Academic Degrees Committee of the State Council."

== Responsibility ==
The State Council Academic Degrees Committee is an institution established by the State Council to lead and manage the granting of academic degrees and related work nationwide. Its tasks include:

- to formulate and revise the implementation measures of the Degree Regulations, submit them to the State Council for approval, organize their implementation, and formulate relevant rules and regulations;
- to organize and guide the work of the Academic Degrees Committee's subject review groups;
- to organize the formulation of the catalog of disciplines and majors for granting doctoral and master's degrees;
- to organize the review and approval of the units and their disciplines and majors for granting doctoral and master's degrees;
- to guide and inspect the granting of doctoral and master's degrees;
- to be responsible for the granting of honorary doctoral degrees;
- to be responsible for international exchanges and cooperation in degree work;
- to promote the reform of degree work;
- to process appeals on degrees granting;
- to request the State Council to suspend or cancel the authorization for degree granting of some institutions.
- to propose suggestions for revising the Degree Regulations or law, etc.

== Subject consultative groups ==
The subject consultative groups, or academic evaluation groups, of the State Council Academic Degrees Committee are academic expert groups established by the State Council Academic Degrees Committee according to the different disciplines or discipline groups in which degrees are awarded. Interdisciplinary evaluation groups may also be temporarily organized as needed.

The main tasks of the academic evaluation groups are:

- To provide consultation or suggestions to the Academic Degrees Committee of the State Council on major issues concerning academic degrees and postgraduate education;
- To provide review opinions on adding, adjusting, or revoking degree-granting rights of institutions and subjects;
- To conduct research and make recommendations on adjusting and revising the catalog of disciplines and majors for degree awarding;
- To guide, inspect and supervise the degree awarding work of each degree-granting institution;
- To undertake special consultation work on mutual recognition and evaluation of degrees in international exchanges, etc.
- Other tasks entrusted by the Academic Degrees Committee of the State Council.

Each academic evaluation group generally consists of 7 to 21 members, and each group has 2 conveners. The general meeting of all academic evaluation group members is chaired by the Academic Degrees Committee of the State Council; the meetings of each evaluation group are chaired by its conveners. Members of the academic evaluation groups are appointed by the Academic Degrees Committee of the State Council (all part-time), and the daily work of the academic evaluation groups is handled by the Office of the Academic Degrees Committee of the State Council.

== Administrative Agency ==
The administrative agency of the State Council Academic Degrees Committee is the State Council Academic Degrees Committee Office, which is entrusted by the State Council to the Ministry of Education for management and is jointly operating with the Department of Academic Degrees Management and Postgraduate Education of the Ministry of Education.

According to relevant regulations, the Department of Postgraduate Education (Office of the Academic Degrees Committee of the State Council) undertakes the following functions:

- Implementing the national law and regulations on academic degrees;
- Formulating reform and development plans for national degree and postgraduate education;
- Guiding and managing postgraduate training and discipline construction;
- Undertaking the implementation and coordination of projects such as the "Double First-Class Construction";
- Handling the daily work of the Office of Academic Degrees Committee of the State Council.

== See also ==
- Ministry of Education (China)
- State Council of China
