= China Low Carbon Forum =

China Low Carbon Forum is high-level forum on low carbon economy or sustainable development in China. The forum is jointly launched by several institutions and think tanks at both central and local government levels, such as Department of Macroeconomic Research, Development Research Center of the State Council. The forum aims to bring together the nation's top policy makers, scholars, and business leaders to address the challenges of a low-carbon economy for the world's fastest developing country. Against the backdrop of global warming, the forum is designed to promote energy-saving and carbon emission reduction in China. The China Low Carbon Forum is an annual event. The inaugural forum will be held at the Baiyun International Convention Center in Guangzhou from November 28 to 30. During a press release session held in Oct 18, the Organizing Committee announced that Nobel Prize Laureate James Mirrlees would attend the forum as a keynote speaker.

== Organizers ==
- Department of Macroeconomics Research, the Development Research Center of the State Council;
- Division of the Almanac of China's Economy, the Development Research Center of the State Council;
- Low Carbon Research Center, Association of China Macroeconomic Research;
- Association of China Environmental Studies;
- Development Research Center of Guangdong Provincial Government;
- Academy of Social Sciences, Guangdong Province;
- Association of China environmental Studies, Guangdong Province.

== Co-organizer ==
Guangzhou Zhongjian Media

== Advising institutions ==
- Center for Environment Development Research, Ministry of Environment Protection of P.R.C
- CDM Center, Institute of Energy, National Development and Reform Committee
- Institute of Economic Research, Ministry of Science and Technology

== Issues to be addressed ==
1. Direction and requirement of the development of China's low carbon industry as reflected in the 12th Five Year Plan.
2. China's policies regarding energy saving and emission reduction.
3. Problems and trend of carbon trading development in China.
4. The formulation of carbon emission criteria and its current situation.
5. Sustainable urban development in China.
6. Design of low carbon industrial park, energy-saving and emission-reducing in Chinese citie
7. Opportunities, problems in the development of China's distributed energy and solutions.
8. Energy performance contracting mode.
9. Innovation in financing through future orders by companies.
10. Guangdong Province’s objective, policy and measure in energy-saving and emission reducing during the 12th Five Year Plan period.

== See also ==
- China Carbon Forum
