= Yang Xiaowei =

- 杨小伟

Vice Chairperson of Education, Science, Culture, Health and Sports Committee of the Chinese People's Political Consultative Conference
- In office March 2023 – April 2025
- Chairperson: Chen Baosheng

Deputy Director of the National Radio and Television Administration
- In office August 2021 – December 2023
- Director: Nie Chenxi; Xu Lin

Deputy Head of the Cyberspace Administration of China
- In office June 2017 – August 2021
- Head: Xu Lin; Zhuang Rongwen

Personal details
- Born: September 1963 (age 63) Chongqing, China
- Party: Chinese Communist Party (expelled)
- Education: Management Cadre College of the Ministry of Posts and Telecommunications

Chinese name
- Simplified Chinese: 杨小伟
- Traditional Chinese: 楊小偉
Transcriptions
Standard Mandarin
- Hanyu Pinyin: Yáng Xiǎowěi

Yang Xiaowei (Chinese: 杨小伟; born September 1963) is a former Chinese executive and politician. He was investigated by China's top anti-graft agency in April 2025. Previously he served as vice chairperson of Education, Science, Culture, Health and Sports Committee of the Chinese People's Political Consultative Conference, and before that, deputy director of the National Radio and Television Administration and deputy head of the Cyberspace Administration of China. He was a vice president of the All-China Journalists Association.

Yang was a representative of the 20th National Congress of the Chinese Communist Party and a member of the 14th National Committee of the Chinese People's Political Consultative Conference.

== Early life ==
Yang was born in September 1963, in Chongqing.

== Career ==
Yang entered the workforce in July 1981, and joined the Chinese Communist Party (CCP) in December 1984. He graduated from the Management Cadre College of the Ministry of Posts and Telecommunications in 1990. He worked at Chongqing Telecommunications Bureau for a long time, ultimately being appointed deputy director in July 1995 and director in February 2001.

Yang was general manager of the Chongqing Branch of China United Communications Corporation in February 2002 before being assigned to the similar position in Guangdong in May 2003. He was elevated to deputy general manager of China United Communications Corporation in December 2003.

In May 2008, Yang became deputy general manager of China Telecommunications Corporation, rising to general manager in April 2016.

In June 2017, Yang became deputy head of the Cyberspace Administration of China, he remained in that position until August 2021, when he was appointed deputy director of the National Radio and Television Administration. He took up the post of vice chairperson of Education, Science, Culture, Health and Sports Committee of the Chinese People's Political Consultative Conference which he held only from March 2023 to April 2025, although he remained deputy director of the National Radio and Television Administration until December 2023.

== Investigation ==
On 17 April 2025, Yang was placed under investigation for "serious violations of laws and regulations" by the Central Commission for Discipline Inspection (CCDI), the party's internal disciplinary body, and the National Supervisory Commission, the highest anti-corruption agency of China. On 10 November, Yang was expelled from the Party and the public office.

On 20 October 2026, Yang was sentenced to 12 years and fined 3 million yuan at the Xiangyang Intermediate People's Court, for taking bribes in 33.19 million yuan.
