= Li Qitao =

Li Qitao (1920 - May 17, 1996, Chinese: 李琦涛), originally from Shanghai, was an educator in the People's Republic of China.

== Biography ==
Following his involvement in the Anti-Japanese War during his youth, he became a member of the Chinese Communist Party (CCP) Shanghai School Committee and served as secretary of the Middle School Committee. In 1948, he was appointed to the Working Committee of the CCP Shanghai Municipal Committee. Following the establishment of the People's Republic of China, he held the positions of first deputy secretary of the Shanghai Municipal Youth League Committee, deputy director of the Foreign Cultural Liaison Committee of the People's Republic of China (Chinese: 中华人民共和国对外文化联络委员会), and deputy minister of education, died in 1996.
