= Minister of Education (China) =

Minister of the People's Republic of China

Minister of Education of the People's Republic of China
- 中华人民共和国教育部部长
- National Emblem of China

- Flag of China

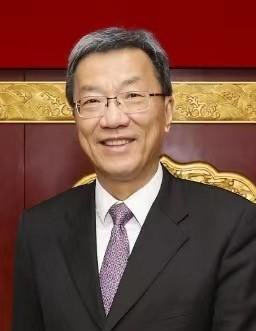
- Incumbent; Huai Jinpeng since 20 August 2021
- Ministry of Education
- Status: Provincial and ministerial-level official
- Member of: Plenary Meeting of the State Council
- Seat: Ministry of Education Building, Xicheng District, Beijing
- Nominator: Premier (chosen within the Chinese Communist Party)
- Appointer: President with the confirmation of the National People's Congress or its Standing Committee
- Precursor: Minister of Education of the Republic of China
- Formation: 19 October 1949; 76 years ago
- First holder: Ma Xulun
- Deputy: Vice Minister of Education
- Website: www.moe.gov.cn/jyb_zzjg/moe_187/

The minister of education of the People's Republic of China is the head of the Ministry of Education of the People's Republic of China and a member of the State Council. Within the State Council, the position is fourth in order of precedence. The minister is responsible for leading the ministry, presiding over its meetings, and signing important documents related to the ministry. Officially, the minister is nominated by the premier of the State Council, who is then approved by the National People's Congress or its Standing Committee and appointed by the president.

The current minister is Huai Jinpeng, who concurrently serves as the Chinese Communist Party Committee Secretary of the ministry.

== History ==
The Ministry of Education of the Central People's Government was established on 1 October 1949, and Ma Xulun became the first minister on 19 October. The ministry was reorganized to the Ministry of Education of the PRC in September 1954, and the title of the minister was also changed. On 26 July 1968, during the Cultural Revolution, the Central Committee of the Chinese Communist Party, the State Council and the Central Military Commission decided to implement military rule over the ministry; the Director of the Military Control Commission Zhu Kui served as the head of the ministry. On 22 June 1970, the Ministry of Education was abolished and merged into the Science and Education Group of the State Council. On 17 January 1975, the Science and Education Group of the State Council was abolished and the Ministry of Education was re-established. On 18 June 1985, the Ministry of Education was renamed to the State Education Commission, and was named back to the Ministry of Education on 10 March 1993.

== List of ministers ==
No.	Portrait	Name (Birth–Death)	Term of office			Important offices held during tenure	Premier	Ref.
No.	Portrait	Name (Birth–Death)	Took office	Left office	Term	Important offices held during tenure	Premier	Ref.
Minister of Education of the Central People's Government
1		Ma Xulun 马叙伦 (1885–1970)	19 October 1949	15 November 1952	3 years, 27 days	Member of the Central People's Government; Deputy Director of the Cultural and Educational Committee of the Central People's Government; Director of the Chinese Character Reform Research Committee; Chairman of the China Democratic League	Zhou Enlai	
2		Zhang Xiruo 张奚若 (1889–1973)	15 November 1952	28 September 1954	1 year, 317 days	Vice Chairman of the Political and Legal Affairs Committee of the State Council; President of the Chinese People's Institute of Foreign Affairs	Zhou Enlai	
Minister of Education of the People's Republic of China
2		Zhang Xiruo 张奚若 (1889–1973)	28 September 1954	11 February 1958	3 years, 136 days	Director of the Foreign Cultural Liaison Committee; President of the Chinese People's Institute of Foreign Affairs	Zhou Enlai	
3		Yang Xiufeng 杨秀峰 (1897–1983)	11 February 1958	22 July 1964	6 years, 162 days	Secretary of the Party Leadership Group of the Ministry of Education; Deputy Director of the Second Office of the State Council	Zhou Enlai	
–		Liu Jiping 刘季平 (1915–1990)	22 July 1964	4 October 1964	74 days	Deputy Secretary of the Party Leadership Group of the Ministry of Education	Zhou Enlai	
4		He Wei 何伟 (1910–1973)	4 October 1964	26 July 1968	3 years, 296 days		Zhou Enlai	
Director of the Military Control Commission of the Ministry of Education
–		Zhu Kui 朱奎 (1916–1982)	26 July 1968	22 June 1970	1 year, 331 days		Zhou Enlai	
From 22 June 1970 to 17 January 1975, the post of Minister of Education was abolished.
Minister of Education of the People's Republic of China
5		Zhou Rongxin 周荣鑫 (1917–1976)	17 January 1975	13 April 1976	1 year, 87 days		Zhou Enlai ↓ Hua Guofeng	
Vacant; 13 April 1976 – 25 January 1977
6		Liu Xiyao 刘西尧 (1916–2013)	25 January 1977	23 February 1979	2 years, 29 days	Secretary of the Party Leadership Group of the Ministry of Education	Hua Guofeng	
7		Jiang Nanxiang 项怀诚 (1913–1988)	23 February 1979	4 May 1982	3 years, 70 days	Secretary of the Party Leadership Group of the Ministry of Education	Hua Guofeng ↓ Zhao Ziyang	
8		He Dongchang 何东昌 (1923–2014)	4 May 1982	18 June 1985	3 years, 45 days	Secretary of the Party Leadership Group of the Ministry of Education; Vice Chairman of the Academic Degrees Committee of the State Council	Zhao Ziyang	
Director of the State Education Commission of the People's Republic of China
9		Li Peng 李鹏 (1928–2019)	18 June 1985	12 April 1988	2 years, 299 days	Vice Premier of the State Council; Head of the State Council's Electronic Revitalization Leading Group; Secretary of the CCP Secretariat; Member of the CCP Politburo Standing Committee; Acting Premier of the State Council	Zhao Ziyang ↓ Li Peng	
10		Li Tieying 李铁映 (born 1936)	12 April 1988	29 March 1993	4 years, 351 days	Secretary of the Party Leadership Group of the State Education Commission; Member of the CCP Politburo; State Councillor	Li Peng	
11		Zhu Kaixuan 朱开轩 (1932–2016)	29 March 1993	10 March 1998	4 years, 346 days	Alternate Member of the CCP Central Committee; Director of the NPC Education, Science, Culture and Public Health Committee	Li Peng	
Minister of Education of the People's Republic of China
12		Chen Zhili 陈至立 (born 1942)	10 March 1998	17 March 2003	5 years, 7 days	Secretary of the Party Leadership Group of the Ministry of Education	Zhu Rongji	
13		Zhou Ji 周济 (born 1946)	17 March 2003	31 October 2009	6 years, 228 days	Secretary of the Party Leadership Group of the Ministry of Education	Wen Jiabao	
14		Yuan Guiren 袁贵仁 (born 1950)	31 October 2009	2 July 2016	6 years, 245 days	Secretary of the Party Leadership Group of the Ministry of Education	Wen Jiabao ↓ Li Keqiang	
15		Chen Baosheng 陈宝生 (born 1956)	2 July 2016	20 August 2021	5 years, 49 days	Secretary of the Party Leadership Group of the Ministry of Education	Li Keqiang	
16		Huai Jinpeng 怀进鹏 (born 1962)	20 August 2021	Incumbent	5 years, 18 days	Secretary of the Party Leadership Group of the Ministry of Education	Li Keqiang ↓ Li Qiang	

== See also ==
- Ministry of Education (Taiwan) lists pre-1949 ministers of education in the Republic of China, which controlled portions of mainland China until that year
