= Committee of Education, Science, Health and Sports =

Special Committee of the CPPCC National Committee

- 中国人民政治协商会议全国委员会 教科卫体委员会
- Formation: June 9, 1988
- Type: Special Committee of the CPPCC
- Location: Beijing
- Chairperson: Chen Baosheng (陈宝生)
- Parent organization: National Committee of the Chinese People's Political Consultative Conference
- Website: http://www.cppcc.gov.cn/zxww/newcppcc/jkwwtwyh/index.shtml
- Formerly called: Committee of Education, Science, Culture, Health and Sports

Chinese name
- Simplified Chinese: 中国人民政治协商会议全国委员会教科卫体委员会
- Traditional Chinese: 中國人民政治協商會議全國委員會教科衛體委員會
Transcriptions
Standard Mandarin
- Hanyu Pinyin: Zhōngguó Rénmín Zhèngzhì Xiéshāng Huìyì Quánguó Wěiyuánhuì Jiào Kē Wèi Tǐ Wěiyuánhuì

Shortest form
- Simplified Chinese: 全国政协教科卫体委员会
- Traditional Chinese: 全國政協教科衛體委員會
Transcriptions
Standard Mandarin
- Hanyu Pinyin: Quánguó Zhèngxié Jiào Kē Wèi Tǐ Wěiyuánhuì

The Committee of Education, Science, Health and Sports is one of ten special committees of the National Committee of the Chinese People's Political Consultative Conference, China's top political advisory body and a central part of the Chinese Communist Party's united front system.

== History ==
The committee was created in June 1988 during the 7th National Committee of the Chinese People's Political Consultative Conference. In 2018, it was renamed from the Committee of Education, Science, Culture, Health and Sports to the Committee of Education, Science, Health and Sports as part of the deepening the reform of the Party and state institutions.

== List of chairpersons ==
No.	Chairpersons	Took office	Left office	Notes
7th	Fang Yi	June 1988	21 May 1993	
7th	Qian Xuesen	June 1988	21 May 1993	
7th	Qian Zhengying	June 1988	21 May 1993	
8th	Qian Weichang	21 May 1993	16 March 1998	
8th	Zhu Guangya	21 May 1993	16 March 1998	
8th	Qian Zhengying	21 May 1993	16 March 1998	
9th	Liu Zhongde	16 March 1998	15 March 2003	
10th	Liu Zhongde	15 March 2003	15 March 2008	
11th	Xu Guanhua	15 March 2008	13 March 2013	
12th	Zhang Yutai	13 March 2013	16 March 2018	
13th	Yuan Guiren	16 March 2018	13 March 2023	
14th	Chen Baosheng	13 March 2023	Incumbent	

== See also ==
- Committee on Culture, Historical Data and Studies
- Education, Science, Culture and Public Health Committee of the NPC
