= Zhang Xiruo =

Chinese politician (1889–1973)

- 张奚若
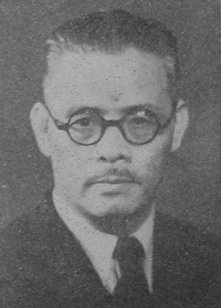
- Zhang Xiruo

Director of the Foreign Cultural Liaison Committee
- In office April 1959 – 1968
- Premier: Zhou Enlai
- Preceded by: New title
- Succeeded by: Huang Zhen

Minister of Education
- In office 15 November 1952 – 11 February 1958
- Premier: Zhou Enlai
- Preceded by: Ma Xulun
- Succeeded by: Yang Xiufeng

Personal details
- Born: 1889 Chaoyi County, Shaanxi, Qing China
- Died: July 18, 1973 (aged 83) Beijing, China
- Party: Tongmenghui
- Spouse: Yang Jingren
- Children: Zhang Wenpu
- Education: Columbia University

Chinese name
- Simplified Chinese: 张奚若
- Traditional Chinese: 張奚若
Transcriptions
Standard Mandarin
- Hanyu Pinyin: Zhāng Xīruò

Xiruo
- Chinese: 熙若
Transcriptions
Standard Mandarin
- Hanyu Pinyin: Xīruò

Yun
- Chinese: 耘
Transcriptions
Standard Mandarin
- Hanyu Pinyin: Yún

Zhang Xiruo (Chinese: 张奚若; October 1889 – 18 July 1973), courtesy name Xiruo, art name Yun, was a Chinese politician who served as Minister of Education from 1952 to 1958 and director of the Foreign Cultural Liaison Committee from 1959 to 1968.

Zhang was a delegate to the 1st, 2nd, 3rd, and 4th National People's Congress. He was a member of the Standing Committee of the 1st, 2nd, 3rd, and 4th Chinese People's Political Consultative Conference.

== Biography ==
Zhang was born into a family that owned a pharmacy in Chaoyi County (now Zhaoyi Town), Shaanxi, in October 1889. At the age of 18, he attended Hongdao Academy, one of the earliest modern schools established in Shaanxi, where he studied alongside Wu Mi. One year later, he led and organized a student movement, drove away two Japanese teachers, and was forced to flee to Shanghai. He joined the Tongmenghui and took part in the Xinhai Revolution. In 1913, he pursued advanced studies in the United States, obtaining a master's degree in political science from Columbia University in 1919.

Zhang returned to China in 1925 and successively worked as director of the International Publication Exchange Bureau, director of the Higher Education Department of the Ministry of Education, and professor at National Central University. In August 1929, he was recruited as a professor in the Department of Political Science, Tsinghua University.

In June 1949, Zhang was appointed as deputy director of the newly established North China Higher Education Commission. On 21 June 1949, during the first meeting of the preparatory committee for the Chinese People's Political Consultative Conference (CPPCC), when discussing the name of the new China, he proposed using the name "People's Republic of China". On September 27, the first plenary session of the CPPCC adopted the new name proposed by him and included it in the Common Program of the CPPCC. In December 1949, he became president of the Chinese People's Institute of Foreign Affairs, in which he made positive contributions in promoting the establishment of diplomatic relations between China, France, and Japan. In September 1952, he succeeded Ma Xulun as minister of education. During his term in office, he presided over patriotic education, civic education, and labor education, improved the curriculum and school system, promoted students to speak Mandarin, and formulated the "Code of Conduct for Primary School Students". In 1956, at a "study conference", he emphasized that "shouting 'Long live' is the decline of human civilization." (喊‘万岁’，这是人类文明的堕落). In 1957, the Central Committee of the Chinese Communist Party launched the "Rectification Movement", he gave Mao Zedong an evaluation: "Great achievements, eager for quick success, disdainful of the past, superstitious about the future." (好大喜功，急功近利，鄙视既往，迷信将来) He also said: "Nowadays, it seems that everything starts after liberation of China. In the past, everything was feudal, and before Karl Marx was born, humanity had no culture." Although Mao was dissatisfied with Zhang's criticism, but he believed that Zhang was a good person. In April 1959, he was chosen as director of the Foreign Cultural Liaison Committee, and served until 1968.

In August 1966, during the Cultural Revolution, Zhang was protected by Zhou Enlai and did not face political persecution.

Zhang died in Beijing on 18 July 1973, at the age of 84.

== Publications ==
- 张奚若文集 [Collected Works of Zhang Xiruo] (in Chinese). Beijing: Tsinghua University Press. 1989. ISBN 9787302005049.

== Family ==
Zhang married Yang Jingren (杨景任). Their son, Zhang Wenpu, served as Chinese Ambassador to Canada from 1986 to 1990.

Civic offices
New title	President of the Chinese People's Institute of Foreign Affairs; 1949–1973	Succeeded by Hao Deqing
Government offices
Preceded by Ma Xulun	Minister of Education; 1952–1958	Succeeded by Yang Xiufeng
New title	Director of the Foreign Cultural Liaison Committee; 1959–1968	Succeeded by Huang Zhen
