= Yang Xiufeng =

Chinese politician

- 杨秀峰

Vice Chairman of the Chinese People's Political Consultative Conference
- In office 12 September 1980 – 17 June 1983
- Chairman: Deng Xiaoping

President of the Supreme People's Court
- In office 3 January 1965 – 20 January 1975
- Preceded by: Xie Juezai
- Succeeded by: Jiang Hua

Minister of Higher Education
- In office 1965–1966
- Premier: Zhou Enlai
- Preceded by: Jiang Nanxiang
- Succeeded by: Office abolished
- In office 1954–1958
- Premier: Zhou Enlai
- Preceded by: Office established
- Succeeded by: Jiang Nanxiang

Minister of Education
- In office 11 February 1958 – 22 July 1964
- Premier: Zhou Enlai
- Preceded by: Zhang Xiruo
- Succeeded by: Liu Jiping

Governor of Hebei
- In office 8 August 1949 – 15 November 1952
- Preceded by: Office established
- Succeeded by: Lin Tie

Personal details
- Born: February 24, 1897 Qian'an, Hebei, China
- Died: 10 November 1983 (aged 86) China
- Party: Chinese Communist Party

Chinese name
- Simplified Chinese: 杨秀峰
- Traditional Chinese: 楊秀峰
Transcriptions
Standard Mandarin
- Hanyu Pinyin: Yáng Xiùfēng

Yang Xiufeng (Chinese: 杨秀峰; pinyin: Yáng Xiùfēng; February 24, 1897 – c. November 10, 1983) was a Chinese politician and the president of the Supreme People's Court.

== Biography ==
Yang Xiufeng was born in Qian'an, Hebei in 1897. He was educated in the Beijing Normal School in 1916. He was the president of the Supreme People's Court from 1965 to 1975, and Vice Chairman of Chinese People's Political Consultative Conference from 1980 to 1983.

Political offices
Preceded by New position	Governor of Hebei; 1949–1952	Succeeded by Lin Tie
Government offices
Preceded by Zhang Xiruo	Minister of Education; 1958–1964	Succeeded by Liu Jiping (acting)
Legal offices
Preceded by Xie Juezai	President of the Supreme People's Court; 1965–1975	Succeeded by Jiang Hua
