= Development Research Center of the State Council =

Chinese government research agency

- 国务院发展研究中心; Guówùyuàn Fāzhǎn Yánjiū Zhōngxīn
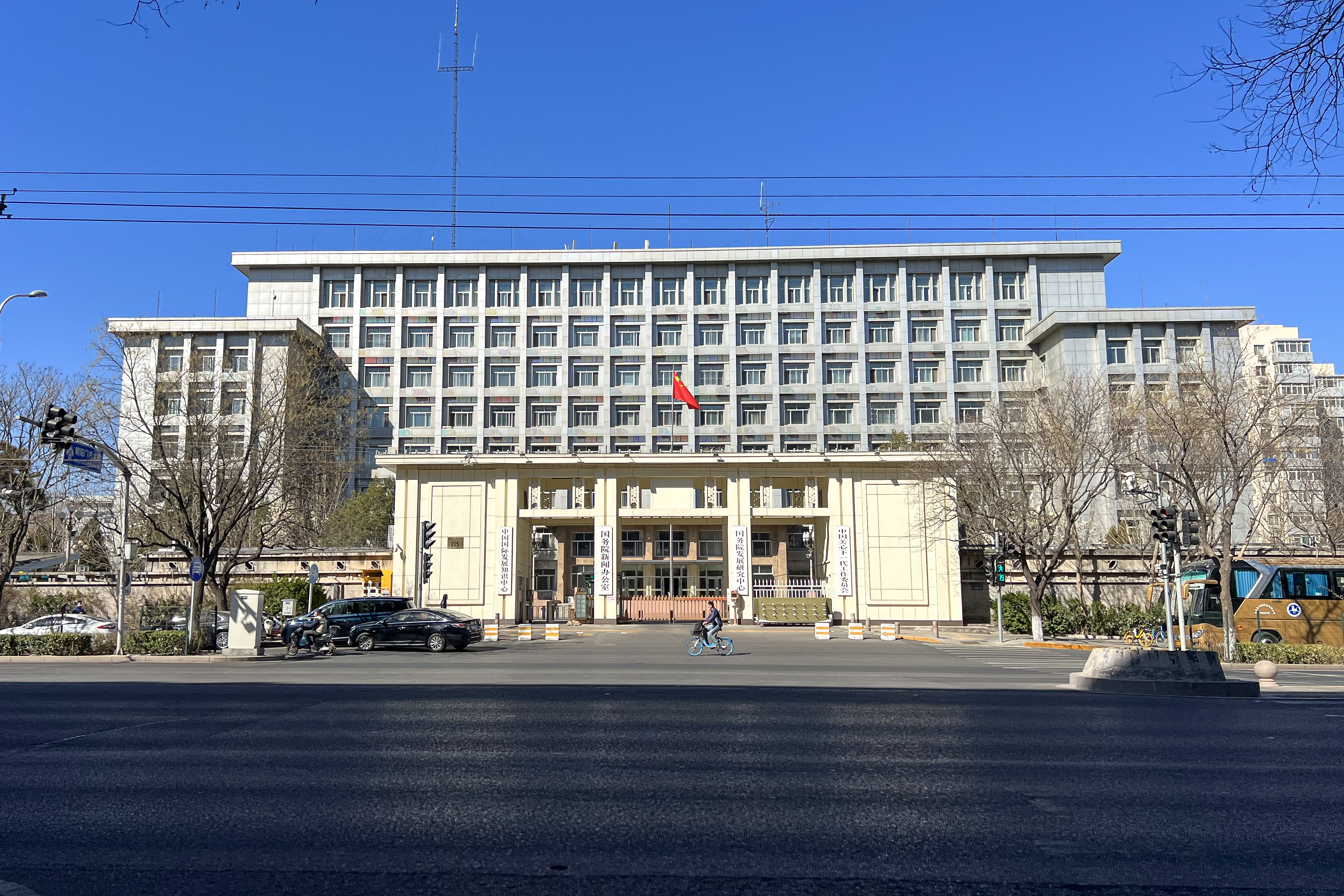

Agency overview
- Jurisdiction: China
- Headquarters: 225 Chaoyangmennei Street, Dongcheng District, Beijing
- Minister responsible: Lu Hao, Director
- Parent agency: State Council
- Website: en.drc.gov.cn

Development Research Center (DRC; Chinese: 国务院发展研究中心; pinyin: Guówùyuàn Fāzhǎn Yánjiū Zhōngxīn) of the State Council of the People's Republic of China is a government body responsible for policy research, strategic review and consulting of issues related to the economic and social development. It recommends policies to Central Committee of the Chinese Communist Party and the State Council.

== Organizational structure ==
The DRC is organized into the following departments.

- Academic Committee
- Committee for Assessment of Academic Qualifications
- General Office (Personnel Bureau)
- Department of International Cooperation
- Department of Macroeconomic Research
- Department of Development Strategy and Regional Economy
- Department of Rural Economy
- Department of Industrial Economy
- Department of Foreign Economic Relations
- Department of Social Development
- Institute of Market Economy
- Institute of Enterprise Research
- Institute of Finance Research
- Institute of Resources and Environment Policies
- Institute of Public Administration and Human Resources
- Information Center
- Service Center
- Center for International Knowledge on Development
- China Development Research Foundation
- Management World Magazine
- China Economic Times
- Almanac of China's Economy
- China Development Observation
- China Development Press
- China Rural Labor Association
- International Technology and Economy Institute
- Euro-Asian Social Development Research Institute
- Institute of World Development
- Asia-Africa Development Research Institute
- Ethnic Minority Groups Development Research Institute
- Institute of Hong Kong and Macau Affairs

== Leadership ==
=== Directors ===
Name	Chinese name	Took office	Left office	Ref.
Ma Hong	马洪	1990	April 1993	
Sun Shangqing	孙尚清	April 1993	April 1996	
Wang Mengkui	王梦奎	March 1998	June 2007	
Zhang Yutai	张玉台	June 2007	April 2011	
Li Wei	李伟	April 2011	May 2019	
Lu Hao	陆昊	8 July 2022	Incumbent	

=== Prominent economists ===
- Xue Muqiao (1904–2005)
- Ma Hong (1920–2007)
- Fengbo Zhang (1957 - )
- Wu Jinglian (1930 - )
- Xie Fuzhan (born 1954)

== Activities ==
The Development Research Center of the State Council publishes the High-Quality BRI indices, which evaluate Belt and Road Initiative projects on dimensions like economic contribution, social impact, and alignment with international standards.
