= Kerry Brown (historian) =

British sinologist

Professor Kerry Brown FRSA
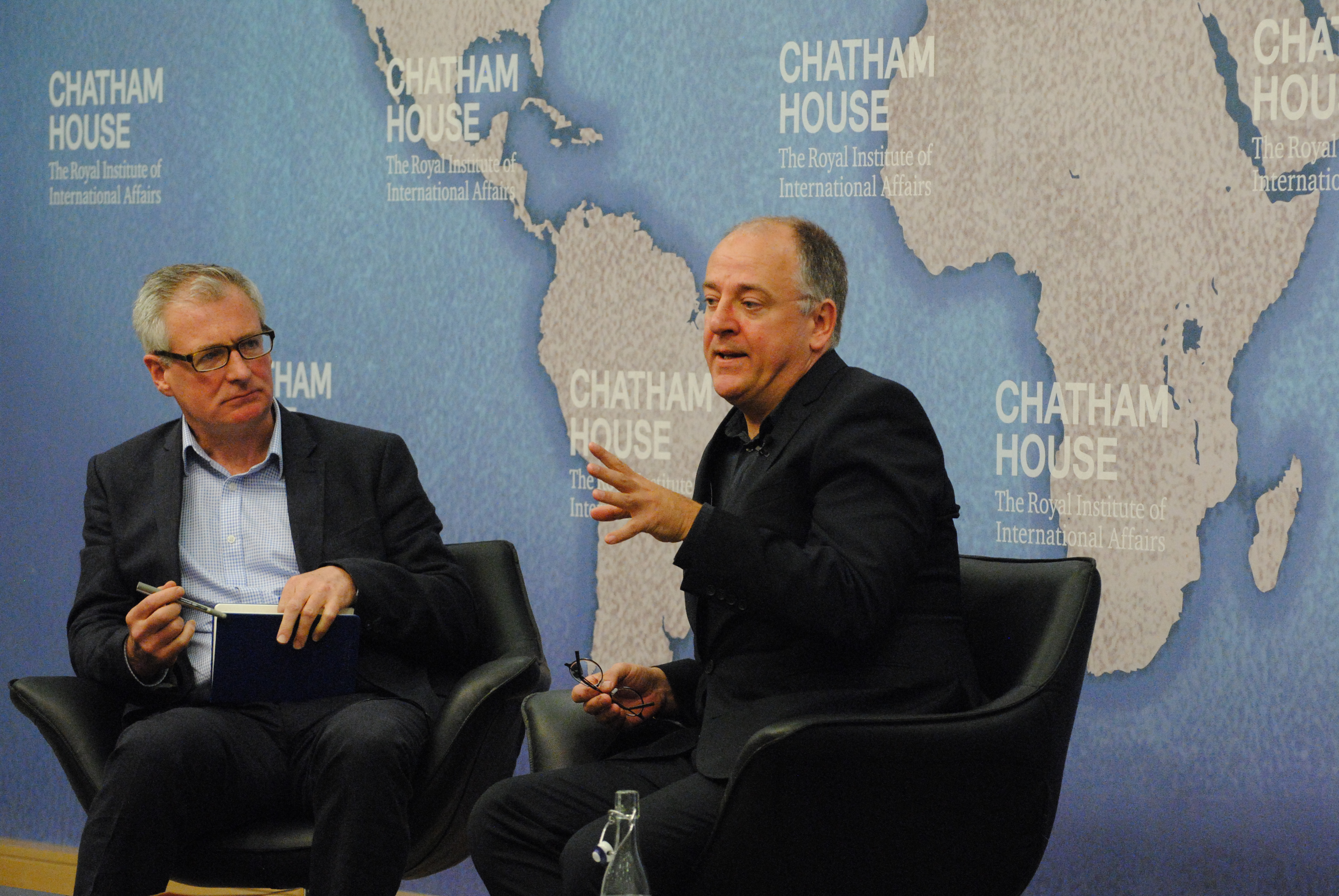
- Brown speaking at Chatham House, 2015

First Secretary of the Embassy of the United Kingdom, Beijing
- In office 1998–2005
- Monarch: Elizabeth II
- Prime Minister: Tony Blair
- Ambassador: Christopher Hum

Personal details
- Education: University of Cambridge (MA); Leeds University (PhD)
- Occupation: Professor, sinologist, author
- Awards: Fellow of the Royal Society of Arts (2017)
- Website: www.kerry-brown.co.uk

Kerry Brown (born 1967) is a British historian, author and sinologist specialising in Chinese history, international relations and politics. Brown is a current Professor of Chinese Studies and Director of the Lau China Institute at King's College, London, President of the Kent Archeological Society, and Associate Fellow on the Asia Pacific programme at Chatham House.

From 2012 to 2015, he was a Professor of Chinese Politics and Director of the China Studies Centre at the University of Sydney, and from 1998 to 2005, he worked at the British Foreign and Commonwealth Office as First Secretary of the Embassy of the United Kingdom, Beijing from 2000 to 2003, and then as Head of the Indonesia, Philippine and East Timor Section from 2003 to 2005. From 2011 to 2014, he led the Europe China Research and Advice Network (ECRAN) funded by the European Union.

== Career ==
Brown is a prolific author on matters relating to contemporary China, having written over 20 books since 2006. His main interests are around the development of politics and society in China from 1949 onwards. He has written in particular about the Chinese Communist Party as a cultural rather than a purely political organisation and about contemporary elite political figures such as Hu Jintao, Xi Jinping, and about China's international relations. In particular, he has produced studies on the kinds of power China's current leader Xi Jinping has, and how to explain the remarkable consolidation at least of symbolic power in the hands of one elite figure. To try to explain this, he has resisted reliance on faction theories, looking at more complex ideas around varying kinds of networks in Chinese society, and the ways that politicians within the Communist system recruit different levels of support. His initial interest was in the role of the Cultural Revolution, in particular in the Inner Mongolian area of the People's Republic, and the ways in which a national campaign was adapted to the specific ethnic and social situation in this region. This grew from two years spent living in Inner Mongolia from 1994 to 1996.

He has also published work academically on the uses of language and its relationship to institutions and power structures in China, and in 2017 was elected a Fellow of the Royal Society of Arts. He is currently working on a history of Britain's relations with China from the 16th century, and the ways in which the complex interaction between the shifting identities of these two powers over the last five centuries have created the multi-layered relationship they have today.

In 2021 Brown was recognised with the 2020 China Cultural Exchange Person of the Year Award from the Guosheng Institute, an award given to those who have "made outstanding contributions to telling China's story well, spreading China's voice effectively, and promoting people-to-people connectivity and mutual learning between Chinese and foreign civilizations under the "Belt and Road" initiative" In 2022 he published a source book of materials of key European thinkers from Hegel to Leibniz to Weber and their thinking on China from the 17th century to the 1970s. He has written for every major news outlet, appeared on all major news networks commenting on China, and lectured about China in over 45 countries across four continents.

== Education ==
Brown holds an M.A. from Cambridge University and a PhD in Chinese politics and language from Leeds University. He has a postgraduate diploma in Chinese from the University of West London.

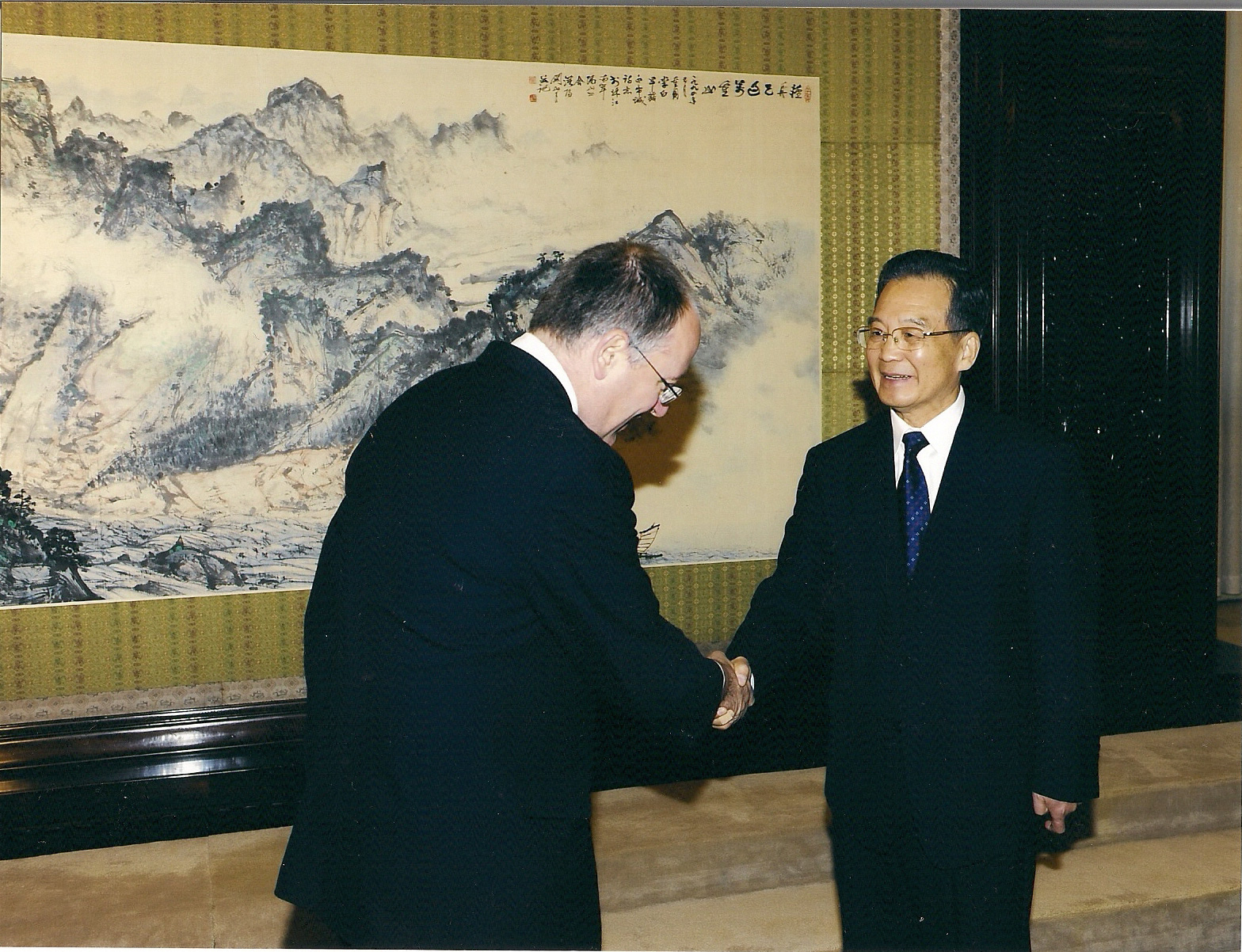
Kerry Brown meets Wen Jiabao, 2009

== Bibliography ==
- 2026 - Mao: Power and Contradiction
- 2024 - The Taiwan Story: How a Small Island Will Dictate the Global Future
- 2022 - Xi: A Study in Power
- 2020 – China (Polity Histories)
- 2020 – A Tale of Five Chinese Cities (In English and Chinese)
- 2019 – The Trouble with Taiwan: the United States and a Rising China
- 2019 – The Future of UK China Relations: The Search for a New Model
- 2019 – The World According to Xi: Everything You Need to Know About the New China
- 2018 – China's Dream: The Culture of Chinese Communism and the Secret Sources of Its Power
- 2017 – China's World: What Does China Want
- 2016 – CEO, China: Xi Jinping
- 2015 – Berkshire Dictionary of Chinese Biography, four volumes 2014–2015, online with Oxford Reference
- 2015 – What's Wrong with Diplomacy: The Case of the UK and China
- 2014 – The New Emperors: Power and the Princelings in China
- 2012 – Hu Jintao: China's Silent Ruler
- 2011 – China 2020
- 2009 – Friends and Enemies: The Past, Present and Future of the Communist Party of China
- 2008 – The Rise of the Dragon – Chinese Investment Flows in the Reform Period
- 2007 – Struggling Giant: China in the 21st Century
