= Zhong Binglin =

Chinese university administrator and politician (1951–2024)

- 钟秉林

President of Beijing Normal University
- In office April 2001 – July 2012
- Party Secretary: Liu Chuansheng; Cheng Jianping
- Preceded by: Yuan Guiren
- Succeeded by: Dong Qi

Personal details
- Born: July 1951 Beijing, China
- Died: 7 April 2024 (aged 72) Beijing, China
- Party: Chinese Communist Party
- Education: Southeast University; Cardiff University

Chinese name
- Simplified Chinese: 钟秉林
- Traditional Chinese: 鐘秉林
Transcriptions
Standard Mandarin
- Hanyu Pinyin: Zhōng Bǐnglín

Zhong Binglin (Chinese: 钟秉林; July 1951 – 7 April 2024) was a Chinese university administrator and politician who served as president of Beijing Normal University from 2001 to 2012. He was a member of the Chinese Communist Party (CCP). He was a member of the 11th and 12th National Committee of the Chinese People's Political Consultative Conference.

== Biography ==
Zhong was born in Beijing in July 1951. After graduating from Beijing No. 4 High School in 1969, he became a sent-down youth in Yan'an, a birthplace of the Communist revolution in northwest China's Shaanxi province. In 1973, he enrolled at Nanjing Institute of Technology (now Southeast University), where he majored in the Department of Mechanical Engineering. After graduation, he stayed for teaching. He was promoted to associate professor in 1988 and to full professor in 1992. In 1990, he was sent to Cardiff University to study at the expense of the government, where he earned doctor of philosophy degree. He returned to China in 1994 and that year became vice president of Southeast University.

In September 1996, he was appointed director of the Higher Education Department of the National Education Commission (now Ministry of Education).

In April 2001, he was chosen as president of Beijing Normal University, a position he held until July 2012.

Zhong died on 7 April 2024, at the age of 72.

Educational offices
| Preceded by Yuan Guiren | President of Beijing Normal University; 2001–2012 | Succeeded by Dong Qi |
