= Democratization of international relations =

Chinese Communist Party slogan

- Simplified Chinese: 国际关系民主化
Transcriptions
Standard Mandarin
- Hanyu Pinyin: Guójì guānxì mínzhǔhuà

The democratization of international relations is a Chinese Communist Party (CCP) slogan, which contends that the formulation of the international order should rely on the joint formulation of all member states of the United Nations (UN) and should also be jointly observed by all member states of the UN, and that world affairs can only be discussed and handled by governments and people of all countries. it was first proposed during CCP general secretary Hu Jintao's administration and is a concept of multilateralism in international relations that CCP general secretary Xi Jinping has promoted during his tenure.

== History ==
=== Hu Jintao era ===
During the 2000s, Hu Jintao, the general secretary of the Chinese Communist Party, promoted "jointly advancing the democratization of international relations" as a flagship slogan. The democratization of international relations during Hu era is a description of the changes in the international order brought about by the collective rise of emerging powers represented by China, India, Brazil and other countries. CCP's definition equated democracy with equality among states rather than democracy within states. In his political report to the 17th National Congress of the Chinese Communist Party, Hu Jintao proposed that “we advocate that the people of all countries work together to promote the building of a harmonious world of lasting peace and common prosperity.”

During this period, the democratization of international relations mainly meant:

1. Equality among nations. There is no distinction between high and low, noble and lowly among all nations in the world; they are all equal in terms of national status. International affairs should be resolved through the joint participation of all nations and should not be manipulated or monopolized by one or a few major powers.
2. Paying attention to sovereignty and do not interfere in internal affairs. Adhering to the principles explicitly stipulated in the Charter of the United Nations is also the true essence of the democratization of international relations. The inherent independence, sovereignty and right of each country to choose its own social system and development path are sacred and inviolable, and must be respected and protected. No country may interfere with or infringe upon them in any way.
3. Respect the diversity of civilizations. The democratization of international relations means that various civilizations should be tolerant of each other, learn from each other, complement each other's strengths and weaknesses, and improve together, rather than exclude each other. Respecting the diversity of civilizations means acknowledging and respecting the differences in the history, culture, social system, and development model of various countries, so that various systems and civilizations can coexist peacefully and compete harmoniously.
4. Mutual cooperation and common development. The democratization of international relations includes the democratization of international political relations and the democratization of international economic relations. The democratization of international economic relations requires the international community to strengthen cooperation on the basis of equality and mutual benefit. Developed countries have a responsibility to take concrete measures to help developing countries achieve their development goals.
5. Opposing hegemonism.

=== Xi Jinping era ===
After Xi Jinping became general secretary of the Chinese Communist Party in 2012, he changed his views on the democratization of international relations and extended "inter-civilizational tolerance" to the tolerance of democratic practices. He said, "Democracy is diverse and there is no universally applicable model. Different countries have different national conditions and democratic models are not the same. Countries should respect each other, seek common ground while reserving differences, exchange and learn from each other, promote unity and cooperation." He also believed that international affairs should be discussed and handled by all countries. He said that promoting the democratization of international relations and practicing true multilateralism is the will of the people and the general trend. In addition, the following meanings have been added:

1. Sovereign equality
2. Maintaining the international order based on international law
3. Universal safety

This period further guided the democratization of international relations towards building a community with a shared future for mankind. According to Marina Rudyak of the China Decoding project, the term "implies redistributing power toward developing countries and emerging powers without embracing liberal-democratic norms" and that this vision is "explicitly state-centric, defining “interventionism” broadly to include external criticism, which is framed as a violation of sovereignty".
