= Du Zhanyuan =

Chinese politician

Du Zhanyuan (born in July 1962, Chinese: 杜占元), born in Huarong, Hunan, is a politician in the People's Republic of China.

== Biography ==
Du Zhanyuan became a member of the Chinese Communist Party (CPC) in June 1985. In 1982, he graduated from Hunan Agricultural College with a major in physiology and biochemistry in the basic course department. In 1985, he obtained a master's degree in plant physiology and biochemistry from the Department of Agronomy at Beijing Agricultural University. In 1993, he obtained his PhD in Plant Physiology and Biochemistry from the Department of Plant and Soil Science at the University of Massachusetts, USA. In 1994, he held the position of deputy director of the Planning Division within the Department of Comprehensive Planning of the State Science and Technology Commission (SSTC). In 1997, he ascended to the role of Director of the Planning Division of the SSTC. By 1998, he became the Director of both the Division of Planning Coordination and the Division of Achievement in the Department of Development Planning of the Ministry of Science and Technology. In 2000, he assumed the role of deputy director of the Department of Development Planning at MOST. In 2001, he assumed the role of Director of the Department of Development Planning at MOST. In 2006, he assumed the role of Director of the Department of Rural Science and Technology at MOST. In 2010, he assumed the roles of Vice-Minister of Education and Director of the National Language and Literature Commission of China. In 2018, he assumed the role of Director at China International Communications Group.
