= He Dongchang =

Chinese politician (1923–2014)

- 何东昌

Minister of Education
- In office 4 May 1982 – 18 June 1985
- Premier: Zhao Ziyang
- Preceded by: Jiang Nanxiang
- Succeeded by: Li Peng

Personal details
- Born: April 1923 Zhuji, Zhejiang, China
- Died: 23 January 2014 (aged 90) Beijing, China
- Party: Chinese Communist Party
- Education: National Southwestern Associated University

Chinese name
- Simplified Chinese: 何东昌
- Traditional Chinese: 何東昌
Transcriptions
Standard Mandarin
- Hanyu Pinyin: Hé Dōngchāng

He Dongchang (Chinese: 何东昌; April 1923 – 23 January 2014) was a Chinese politician who served as minister of education from 1982 to 1985.

He was a member of the 12th and 13th Central Committee of the Chinese Communist Party. He was a delegate to the 3rd and 5th National People's Congress. He was a member of the Standing Committee of the 8th Chinese People's Political Consultative Conference.

== Early life and education ==
He was born in Zhuji, Zhejiang, in April 1923. In 1941, he enrolled at National Southwestern Associated University, where he majored in the Department of Aeronautics.

== Career ==
After graduation in 1947, he taught at Peiyang University (now Tianjin University). He joined the Chinese Communist Party (CCP) in August of the same year. A year later, he moved to Tsinghua University, where he presided over the establishment of the Department of Engineering Physics and also served as the department head. In the winter of 1973, he was labeled as "a representative figure of the bourgeois restoration forces" (资产阶级复辟势力代表人物) by Chi Qun, and later reinstated in 1977. After the Cultural Revolution, he continued to work at Tsinghua University, where he was promoted to deputy party secretary in May 1977 and to vice president in 1978.

In April 1982, he was appointed minister of education, in addition to serving as president of the Open University Of China since September 1984.

== Death ==
On 23 January 2014, he died of an illness in Beijing, at the age of 90.

Government offices
Preceded by Jiang Nanxiang	Minister of Education; 1982–1985	Succeeded by Li Peng
