= Wang Mengkui =

Chinese politician

- 王梦奎

Director of the Development Research Center of the State Council
- In office March 1998 – June 2007
- Premier: Zhu Rongji; Wen Jiabao
- Preceded by: Sun Shangqing
- Succeeded by: Zhang Yutai

Personal details
- Born: April 1938 (age 88) Wen County, Henan, China
- Party: Chinese Communist Party
- Education: Peking University

Chinese name
- Simplified Chinese: 王梦奎
- Traditional Chinese: 王夢奎
Transcriptions
Standard Mandarin
- Hanyu Pinyin: Wáng Mèngkuí

Wang Mengkui (Chinese: 王梦奎; born April 1938) is a Chinese politician who served as director of the Development Research Center of the State Council from 1998 to 2007.

He was an alternate member of the 14th Central Committee of the Chinese Communist Party and a member of the 15th Central Committee of the Chinese Communist Party.

== Biography ==
Wang was born in Wen County, Henan, in April 1938. In 1958, he entered Peking University, majoring in political economics. He joined the Chinese Communist Party (CCP) in June 1956.

After graduating in 1964, he was assigned to Red Flag magazine as an editor, a post he kept until May 1969. In August 1975, he was transferred to the Research Office of the First Ministry of Machinery Industry, and held that office until February 1979, when he was appointed as an official in the General Office of the Chinese Communist Party and the Secretariat of the Chinese Communist Party. He was an official in the State Planning Commission (now National Development and Reform Commission) in September 1987, and was elevated to deputy director of its Economic Research Center in September 1988. In July 1990, he became deputy director of the Development Research Center of the State Council, rising to director in April 1995. In March 2003, he took office as vice chairperson of the National People's Congress Financial and Economic Affairs Committee.

== Publications ==
- 王梦奎看中国经济走向 [Wang Mengkui's View on the Trend of China's Economy] (in Chinese). Beijing: CCP Central Party School Press. 2008. ISBN 9787503539237.
- 王梦奎文集 [Collected Works of Wang Mengkui] (in Chinese). Zhengzhou: Henan People's Publishing House. 2017. ISBN 9787215110489.
- 中国走过来的道路 [The Way of China] (in Chinese). Beijing: China Yanshi Publishing House. 2018. ISBN 9787517129257.
- 王梦奎学术自传 [Academic Autobiography of Wang Mengkui] (in Chinese). Guangzhou: Guangdong Economic Publishing House Co., Ltd. 2020. ISBN 9787545466799.

Government offices
Preceded by Sun Shangqing	Director of the Development Research Center of the State Council; 1998–2007	Succeeded by Zhang Yutai
