= National Conference on Publicity, Ideology and Cultural Work =

Chinese Communist Party gathering

- Simplified Chinese: 全国宣传思想文化工作会议
- Traditional Chinese: 全國宣傳思想文化工作會議
Transcriptions
Standard Mandarin
- Hanyu Pinyin: Quánguó Xuānchuán Sīxiǎng Wénhuà Gōngzuò Huìyì

National Conference on Publicity and Ideology
- Simplified Chinese: 全国宣传思想工作会议
- Traditional Chinese: 全國宣傳思想工作會議
Transcriptions
Standard Mandarin
- Hanyu Pinyin: Quánguó Xuānchuán Sīxiǎng Gōngzuò Huìyì

The National Conference on Publicity, Ideology and Cultural Work (NCPICW) is the highest-level conference in China in regards to publicity, ideological, and cultural work. It is held on an ad hoc basis.

== History ==
On 24 January 1996, a meeting of the National Conference on Publicity and Ideology Work was held. CCP General Secretary Jiang Zemin proposed that "the political tumult of 1989, and the severe missteps in the leading of public opinion taught everyone in the Party an important lesson".

In 2013, a meeting of the National Conference on Publicity and Ideology Work was held. In his speech, which later became known as the August 19 speech, CCP General Secretary Xi Jinping mentioned that "ideological work is an extremely important task of the Party", "consolidating the guiding role of Marxism", and "the propaganda and ideology departments must fulfill their responsibilities". Xi also said that "we must tell the story of socialism with Chinese characteristics, the story of the Chinese dream, the story of the Chinese people, the story of China's excellent culture, and the story of China's peaceful development". CCP Politburo Standing Committee member Liu Yunshan mentioned that "a small group of reactionary intellectuals use the Internet to spread rumors, attack and slander the Party's leadership, the socialist system and the state power. We must severely crack down on them."

In August 2018, a meeting of the National Conference on Publicity and Ideological Work was held. CCP Politburo Standing Committee member Wang Huning chaired the meeting, while CCP General Secretary Xi Jinping delivered a keynote speech. Xi stated the importance of "telling China's stories well and disseminating a positive Chinese narrative."

In 2023, the meeting was renamed to the National Conference on Publicity, Ideology, and Cultural Work. During the conference meeting held on 7–8 October 2023, CCP members put forward the Xi Jinping Thought on Culture. CCP Politburo Standing Committee member Cai Qi, who chaired the meeting, read an instruction from Xi, which called on cultural, ideological, and propaganda work to focus on the "primary political task of arming the whole party and educating the people with the party's innovative theories".
