= China Carbon Forum =

Climate change stakeholder dialogue

China Carbon Forum (CCF) is a non-profit organisation which aims to facilitate stakeholder dialogue in the climate change sector in the People’s Republic of China (PRC), including environmental policy and the renewables, clean tech and Clean Development Mechanism (CDM) markets.

CCF organizes events, including speaker/networking events, stakeholder consultations, and meetings with VIPs, to discuss current climate change issues affecting China. The latest series of events are the China Low Carbon Leadership Network series, jointly organized with GIZ.

The organization is based in Beijing, China.

== History ==
China Carbon Forum was founded in 2007 by a group of professionals from the diplomatic community, Chinese government and industry working in the climate change sector in China, who wanted to increase the exchange of information, best practices and generally engage with other players in the sector.

== Board ==
The CCF Executive and Advisory board is drawn from professionals in the diplomatic community, Chinese government, NGOs, foreign law and consulting firms and foreign and domestic clean energy companies. The chairman of the Board is Dr. Anton Smitsendonk, former Netherlands Ambassador to China.

== See also ==
- China Low Carbon Forum
- Climate change in China
