= Yuan Guiren =

Chinese academic and politician

- 袁贵仁
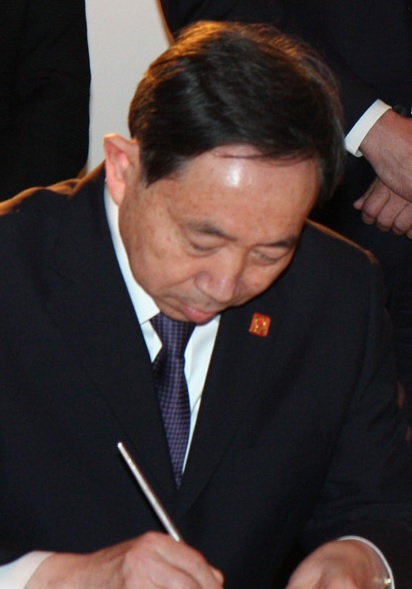
- Yuan Guiren in April 2012.

Chairperson of the Education, Science, Health and Sports Committee of the Chinese People's Political Consultative Conference
- Incumbent
- Assumed office March 2018
- Preceded by: Zhang Yutai

Minister of Education
- In office 31 October 2009 – 2 July 2016
- Preceded by: Zhou Ji
- Succeeded by: Chen Baosheng

President of Beijing Normal University
- In office July 1999 – April 2001
- Preceded by: Chen Shanzhen
- Succeeded by: Zhong Binglin

Personal details
- Born: November 1950 (age 75) Guzhen County, Anhui, China
- Party: Chinese Communist Party
- Education: Beijing Normal University

Chinese name
- Simplified Chinese: 袁贵仁
- Traditional Chinese: 袁貴仁
Transcriptions
Standard Mandarin
- Hanyu Pinyin: Yuán Guìrén

Yuan Guiren (Chinese: 袁贵仁; born November 1950) is a Chinese academic and politician. He formerly served as Minister of Education and president of Beijing Normal University, his alma mater.

== Biography ==
Yuan was born in Guzhen County, Anhui, in November 1950.

In October 2009, he succeeded Zhou Ji as Minister for Education, after the latter had been removed at a regular session of the National People's Congress. He had previously served under Zhou Ji as a deputy minister. At the first plenary session of the 12th National People's Congress in March 2013, he was re-elected.

He was a member of the 17th Central Committee of the Chinese Communist Party, the 17th Central Commission for Discipline Inspection (2007-2012), and a member of the 18th Central Committee.

Educational offices
Previous: Chen Shanzhen (陆善镇)	President of Beijing Normal University; 1999-2001	Next: Zhong Binglin
Government offices
Previous: Zhou Ji	Minister of Education; 2009–2016	Next: Chen Baosheng
Assembly seats
Previous: Zhang Yutai	Chairperson of the Education, Science, Health and Sports Committee of the Chinese People's Political Consultative Conference; 2018	Incumbent
