= August 19 speech =

2013 speech by Xi Jinping

The "August 19" speech (Chinese: 八一九讲话; pinyin: Bāyījiǔ jiǎnghuà) refers to the speech delivered by Xi Jinping, general secretary of the Chinese Communist Party (CCP), at the National Conference on Publicity and Ideological Work on 19 August 2013.

== Content ==
In his speech, Xi Jinping mentioned that "ideological work is an extremely important task of the Party", emphasized "consolidating the guiding role of Marxism", and that "the propaganda and ideology departments must fulfill their responsibilities". Xi said that while "economic construction is central work, we do not say that... one pretty thing can conceal a hundred ugly things". He added "that the masses' material lives are good" is an "incomplete" understanding because the CCP's "mass basis and governance basis includes both material and spiritual aspects". Xi said the CCP must "resolutely overcome the phenomenon of vulgarization brought about by going all the way to meet the market." He warned that "the struggle in the international, ideological and cultural area is profound and complex", stating "Western countries see our country's development and expansion as a challenge to their values, systems and models", leading them to intensify "ideological and cultural infiltration of our country", while stating that the "struggles and tests that we face in the ideological area are long-term and complex". Xi emphasized the importance of ideology, stating:

The disintegration of a regime often begins in the ideological realm. Political turmoil and regime change may happen overnight, but ideological evolution is a longterm process. Once the ideological line of defense is breached, other lines of defense will be difficult to hold. We must firmly grasp the leadership, management, and discourse of ideological work, and we must not set it aside at any time, otherwise we will make irreparable historic mistakes.

He called on the CCP to "use scientific theory to arm our minds and incessantly foster our spiritual garden... by systematically grasping the basis of Marxist theory." He called on the CCP to believe that it had "justice on our side" and not be "evasive, bashful or mince our words" in dealing with the "ideological baselines" of Western countries, adding that "If the question is asked which party, which country and which nation can be self-confident, then the Chinese Communist Party, the People's Republic of China and the Chinese nation have reason for self-confidence, and on this point, truth is on our side." He criticized those that had "an inferiority complex and always believe that nothing in China is good, that everything foreign is good, and have the illusion of using Western systems to transform China". Xi called to intensify efforts to synthesize Marxism with China's traditional culture and "making clear that China's excellent traditional culture reflects the superiority of the Chinese nation, an important spiritual pillar for the Chinese nation... and our most profound cultural soft power". He criticized the weakness of the Western world as demonstrated by the 2008 financial crisis as "abuses" by the "Western capitalist system", while criticizing economic inequality in the West. He additionally criticized Western military operations in the Middle East, adding "While Western countries are exporting their values system and institutional models everywhere, in which country has this met with true success?" He called on cadres to "stand in the teeth of the storm and conduct struggle" and "dare to bare the sword... contending for the absolute majority, launching a struggle for public opinion in a rational, beneficial and proper manner". Xi criticized certain trends within the CCP:

Among our party members and cadre teams, lack of belief is a problem that needs to attract high attention. Among a few people, some have made criticism and mockery of Marxism into a 'fashion' or a comedy. Some are spiritually vapid and believe that Communism is a purely illusory fantasy. They 'don't pay attention to common people but to ghosts and spirits'. They hanker after fortune-telling and physiognomy, they pray to Buddha for help and fetishize 'qigong masters'. Some waver in their faith, migrate their spouses, sons and daughters abroad, store money abroad, and 'leave a back passage' for themselves, preparing to 'jump ship' at any time. Some are slaves of material things, believe in the supremacy of money, the supremacy of fame and the supremacy of enjoyment. They don't have any reverence in their hearts and their acts don't have any baseline at all.

Xi warned of ideological infiltrations from the West, stating the West wanted "to vie with us for the battlefields of people's hearts and for the masses, and in the end to overthrow the leadership of the Chinese Communist Party and China's Socialist system", emphasizing the need for ideological struggle inside China. He stated that there were those "harbouring dissent and discord against the party". He added that "Western anti-China forces continue to vainly attempt to 'topple China'... and infuse (it) with Western ambitions" through cyberspace. Xi stated that the Chinese Dream had mobilized domestic public opinion and "also triggered a vigorous response abroad". He said "international society is paying further attention to the glorious prospects and great opportunities for our country's development" and that "Asia, Africa, Latin America and many other countries, leaders are all openly saying to us that they wish that the Chinese Dream becomes a reality".

Politburo Standing Committee member Liu Yunshan mentioned that "a small group of reactionary intellectuals use the Internet to spread rumors, attack and slander the Party's leadership, the socialist system and the state power. We must severely crack down on them."

== Aftermath ==
After the "August 19" speech was published, local CCP party committee secretaries and propaganda ministers publicly expressed their positions and attitudes on the content of the speech. The CCP also immediately launched a campaign to regulate the Internet. On 20 August, Xinhua News Agency broadcast the main points of the speech, launching a political campaign to study the speech across the country.

== See also ==
- Bibliography of Xi Jinping
