= Institute for a Community with Shared Future =

Chinese government think tank

- 人类命运共同体研究院
- Abbreviation: ICSF
- Formation: November 29, 2019; 6 years ago
- Type: Think tank
- Headquarters: Beijing
- Key people: Li Huailiang
- Parent organization: Ministry of Education
- Affiliations: Communications University of China
- Website: icsf.cuc.edu.cn

Institute for a Community with Shared Future
- Simplified Chinese: 人类命运共同体研究院
Transcriptions

The Institute for a Community with Shared Future (ICSF) is a Beijing-based think tank managed by the Ministry of Education of the People's Republic of China and hosted at the Communication University of China (CUC). Founded in November 2019, the think tank aims to enhance China's "discourse power" overseas and promote the Chinese Communist Party's concept of a "community of shared future for mankind" by establishing research centers with universities in other countries. ICSF has been described as an instrument of the country's soft power and "external propaganda" efforts, and likened to prior Confucius Institutes also established in partnership with multiple universities around the world.

As of 2026, ICSF has opened at least 23 affiliated research centers with overseas universities and think tanks, typically within media studies or China studies departments.

== History ==
On November 29, 2019, the creation of the ICSF was announced at a ceremony held at the CUC. In October 2020, ICSF held a ceremony to begin the launch of affiliated research centers internationally. The same month, the Pakistan Research Center for a Community with Shared Future was formed in Islamabad. In January 2022, ICSF and the Central University of Venezuela established a center.

In November 2024, ICSF and Saint Peter's University in New Jersey jointly established the China-US Research Center for a Community with Shared Future. In January 2025, Wang Yi inaugurated the Research Center on Building a Community with a Shared Future for Mankind at the China Foreign Affairs University. In April 2025, ICSF and Universiti Tunku Abdul Rahman in Malaysia launched the ASEAN Research Centre for a Community with Shared Future. In May 2025, ICSF held the First International Seminar on the Community with Shared Future at the University of Havana.

== See also ==
- Telling China's stories well
- International communication center
- International Department of the Chinese Communist Party
- Chinese People's Association for Friendship with Foreign Countries
- China International Culture Exchange Center
- China Institutes of Contemporary International Relations
