= Yang Shuzi =

Chinese engineer (1933–2022)

- 杨叔子

President of Central China University of Science and Engineering
- In office January 1993 – June 1997
- Preceded by: Huang Shuhuai
- Succeeded by: Zhou Ji

Personal details
- Born: 5 September 1933 Jiujiang County, Jiangxi, China
- Died: 4 November 2022 (aged 89) Wuhan, Hubei, China
- Education: Wuhan University; Huazhong University of Science and Technology
- Scientific career
- Fields: Mechanical engineering
- Workplaces: Central China University of Science and Engineering

Chinese name
- Simplified Chinese: 杨叔子
- Traditional Chinese: 楊叔子
Transcriptions
Standard Mandarin
- Hanyu Pinyin: Yáng Shūzǐ

Yang Shuzi (5 September 1933 – 4 November 2022) was a Chinese engineer. He was born in an intellectual family in Hukou, in the Jiangxi Province. After he earned his bachelor's degree at Huazhong Institute of Technology in 1956, he became a faculty member there. His research mainly focused on machinery diagnostics, information technology, and intelligent technology. In 1991 he was elected a member of Chinese Academy of Sciences, and from 1993 to 1997 he was the president of Huazhong University of Science and Technology. He also developed the cutting vibration theory and error compensation technique as well as cutting monitoring and control systems, non-disassembled engine diagnosis systems, and nondestructive testing theory and technique of steel wire rope.

Yang died on 4 November 2022, at the age of 89.

Educational offices
Preceded by Huang Shuhuai	President of Central China University of Science and Engineering; 1993–1997	Succeeded by Zhou Ji
