= Zhou Ji (politician, born 1946) =

Chinese mechanical engineer and politician

- 周济

President of Chinese Academy of Engineering
- In office June 11, 2010 – June 1, 2018
- Premier: Wen Jiabao; Li Keqiang
- Preceded by: Xu Kuangdi
- Succeeded by: Li Xiaohong

Minister of Education
- In office March 17, 2003 – October 31, 2009
- Premier: Wen Jiabao
- Preceded by: Chen Zhili
- Succeeded by: Yuan Guiren

Mayor of Wuhan
- In office January 14, 2002 – April 28, 2002; Acting: December 31, 2001 – January 14, 2002
- Preceded by: Wang Shouhai
- Succeeded by: Li Xiansheng

President of Huazhong University of Science and Technology
- In office June 25, 1997 – February 12, 2001
- Preceded by: Yang Shuzi
- Succeeded by: Fan Mingwu

Personal details
- Born: August 26, 1946 (age 80) Hankow, Hupeh, Republic of China (now Wuhan, Hubei, China)
- Party: Chinese Communist Party
- Education: Tsinghua University; Huazhong University of Science and Technology; University at Buffalo
- Scientific career
- Fields: Mechanical engineering
- Workplaces: Huazhong University of Science and Technology

Chinese name
- Simplified Chinese: 周济
- Traditional Chinese: 周濟
Transcriptions
Standard Mandarin
- Hanyu Pinyin: Zhōu Jì
- Wade–Giles: Chou Chi

Zhou Ji (Chinese: 周济; born August 26, 1946) is a Chinese mechanical engineer and politician. He served as China's Minister of Education from 2003 to 2009 and President of the Chinese Academy of Engineering from 2010 to 2018. Prior to that, served briefly as Mayor of Wuhan, the capital of Hubei Province.

== Biography ==
Zhou is a native of Shanghai, and attended Tsinghua University in Beijing, where he graduated from in 1970, and received M.E. degree in mechanical engineering from Huazhong University of Science and Technology in 1980. Zhou also acquired a doctorate from the University at Buffalo, The State University of New York (PhD, '84, M.S.'81) in the United States. Much of his early career was spent at the Huazhong University of Science and Technology in Wuhan, where he eventually rose to become the president of Huazhong University of Science and Technology in 1997. He was elected as the fellow of the Chinese Academy of Engineering in 1999. He then spent a tenure in the municipal government of Wuhan, where he served as deputy mayor and Mayor.

He was transferred to work in the Ministry of Education of the People's Republic of China in 2002 as its Vice-Minister, rising to the Minister position on March 17, 2003. At the re-elections of the 2008 National People's Congress, Zhou received the fewest votes in favour out of any minister. He received 384 votes against, with 81 abstentions. During Zhou's time in office, China's education system continued to be plagued by academic dishonesty, corruption, and arbitrary fees, with no discernible signs of improvement. Zhou was also unpopular due to his introduction of 16 "officially sanctioned" educational Peking Opera works, some of which allegedly included themes similar to those during the Cultural Revolution. These works were openly opposed by members of the Chinese People's Political Consultative Conference in March 2009. He was removed in October 2009 at a regular session of the National People's Congress; he was replaced by deputy Yuan Guiren.

He was instead appointed deputy party secretary at the Chinese Academy of Engineering in Beijing, a "less important but still significant post," according to the Chronicle of Higher Education. Stanley Rosen, director of the East Asian Studies Center at the University of Southern California, commented that Mr. Zhou's new post does not suggest serious punishment, and is "a sign that he's a scapegoat, not that he's corrupt."

Due to the contribution in numeric control, computer-aided design, and design optimization, he was selected as the foreign associate of the United States National Academy of Engineering in 2013.

In 2018 he was elected an International Fellow of the Royal Academy of Engineering in the UK.

== See also ==
- List of International Fellows of the Royal Academy of Engineering

Educational offices
Preceded by Yang Shuzi	President of Huazhong University of Science and Technology; 1997–2001	Succeeded by Fan Mingwu
Government offices
Preceded by Wang Shouhai	Mayor of Wuhan; 2002–2002	Succeeded by Li Xiansheng
Preceded by Chen Zhili	Minister of Education; 2003–2009	Succeeded by Yuan Guiren
Academic offices
Preceded by Xu Kuangdi	President of Chinese Academy of Engineering; 2010–2018	Succeeded by Li Xiaohong
