= Chinese People's Institute of Foreign Affairs =

United front organization in China

- 中国人民外交学会
- Logo of the Chinese People's Institute of Foreign Affairs
- Formation: December 15, 1949; 76 years ago
- Type: People's organization
- Headquarters: 71 Nanchizi Street, Dongcheng, Beijing
- President: Wang Chao
- Secretary-general: Yu Jinsong
- Party Secretary: Zhou Haihong
- Website: www.cpifa.org

Chinese People's Institute of Foreign Affairs
- Simplified Chinese: 中国人民外交学会
- Traditional Chinese: 中國人民外交學會
Transcriptions
Standard Mandarin
- Hanyu Pinyin: Zhōngguó Rénmín Wàijiāo Xuéhuì

The Chinese People's Institute of Foreign Affairs (CPIFA) is a people's organization in the People's Republic of China dedicated to promoting the country's public diplomacy.

== History ==
The Chinese People's Institute of Foreign Affairs was founded on 15 December 1949 in Beijing, shortly after the establishment of the People's Republic of China. Initiated by Premier and Foreign Minister Zhou Enlai, it was the first social organization of the People's Republic of China dedicated to the study of foreign policy and international issues, as well as to conducting people-to-people diplomacy. Zhou Enlai served as the institute's Honorary President throughout his lifetime. Vice Premier and Foreign Minister Chen Yi also served as an Honorary President from 1964 until his death.

A number of prominent Chinese leaders were members of the institute, and some held leadership positions within it, including Zhou Enlai, Chen Yi, Deng Xiaoping, Ye Jianying, Wang Ming, Li Lisan, Cai Chang, Hu Yuzhi, Gao Gang, Luo Longji, Liao Chengzhi, and Qiao Guanhua. From 1969 to 1971, the institute's work was suspended due to the impact of the Cultural Revolution. In 1972, the Chinese People's Institute of Foreign Affairs resumed its activities.

Between 1972 and 2002, the CPIFA hosted more than four thousand Americans in China. On 16 December 2009, a ceremony marking the 60th anniversary of the institute was held at the Diaoyutai State Guesthouse in Beijing.

== Functions ==
The CPIFA has been described as a united front organization, and answers to the United Front Work Department. It is focused on international issues and research foreign policy. It also conducts exchanges with foreign officials and focuses on expanding people-to-people diplomatic activities. The CPIFA works to establish contacts with foreign political activists, diplomats, and other individuals and organizes public lectures and symposia on academic subjects and international policy affairs.

== Organization ==
=== Internal organization ===
The institute has the following internal organization:

- Office
- Research Department
- Asia, Africa and Latin America Department
- Europe Department
- North America and Oceania Department
- Party Committee of the Office (Organization and Personnel Department)

=== Presidents ===
1. Zhang Xiruo (1949–1973)
2. Hao Deqing (1977–1983)
3. Han Nianlong (1983–1991)
4. Liu Shuqing (1991–1997)
5. Mei Zhaorong (1997–2003)
6. Lu Qiutian (2003–2006)
7. Yang Wenchang (2006–2016)
8. Wu Hailong (2016–2019)
9. Wang Chao (2019–2025)
10. Wu Ken (2025-)

== See also ==
- International Department of the Chinese Communist Party
- Chinese People's Association for Friendship with Foreign Countries
- China Institutes of Contemporary International Relations
- Institute for a Community with Shared Future
- Hanban
- China International Development Cooperation Agency
