= China Economic Yearbook =

Annual publication about the economy of China

China Economic Yearbook (Almanac of China's Economy, 中国经济年鉴) is an annually published economic record that is published by the Development Research Center of the State Council of the People's Republic of China. Founded in 1981, China Economic Yearbook records the development of China's national economy and social progress annually. It reflects the general development trend of different industries and regions in China through first-hand economic data. Incorporating key economic documents of the central government and records of major economic events of the year, China Economic Yearbook provides comprehensive information and authoritative data about China's economy. As an accurate historical record of China’s economic growth, it is regarded as a key reference for policy makers at central and local levels in China. It is also an indispensable source for those who conduct research on Chinese economy.

== Major chapters ==
1. Key Economic Documents
2. Overall Analysis of National Economy and Social Development
3. Provincial and Ministerial Leaders’ Views on Economy
4. Overview of the Development of National Economy and Different Industries
5. Overview of Regional and Social Developments
6. Overview of Industrial Development
7. Annual Report
8. Key Economic Data
9. Appendix

== Editors ==
Editor-in-Chief

- Zhang Yutai, Director, Development Research Center of the State Council

Deputy Editor-in-chief

- Sheng Huaren, Former Vice-Chairman and Secretary General, the Standing Committee of the National People’s Congress
- Fang Weizhong, President, China Macroeconomic Research Association
- Yuan Baohua, Honorary President, China Enterprises Association, China Entrepreneurs Association
- Wang Chunzheng, Former Vice-Director, National Development and Reform Commission
- Liu Guoguang, Special Consultant, Chinese Academy of Social Sciences
- Xie Fuzhan, Director, Office of Research, the State Council
- Han Jun, Vice-Director, Development Research Center of the State Council
- Ma Jiantang, Director, National Statistics Bureau of China
