= Community of Common Destiny =

Chinese Communist Party policy

- Simplified Chinese: 人类命运共同体
- Traditional Chinese: 人類命運共同體
- Literal meaning: mankind shared-destiny community
Transcriptions
Standard Mandarin
- Hanyu Pinyin: rénlèi mìngyùn gòngtóngtǐ

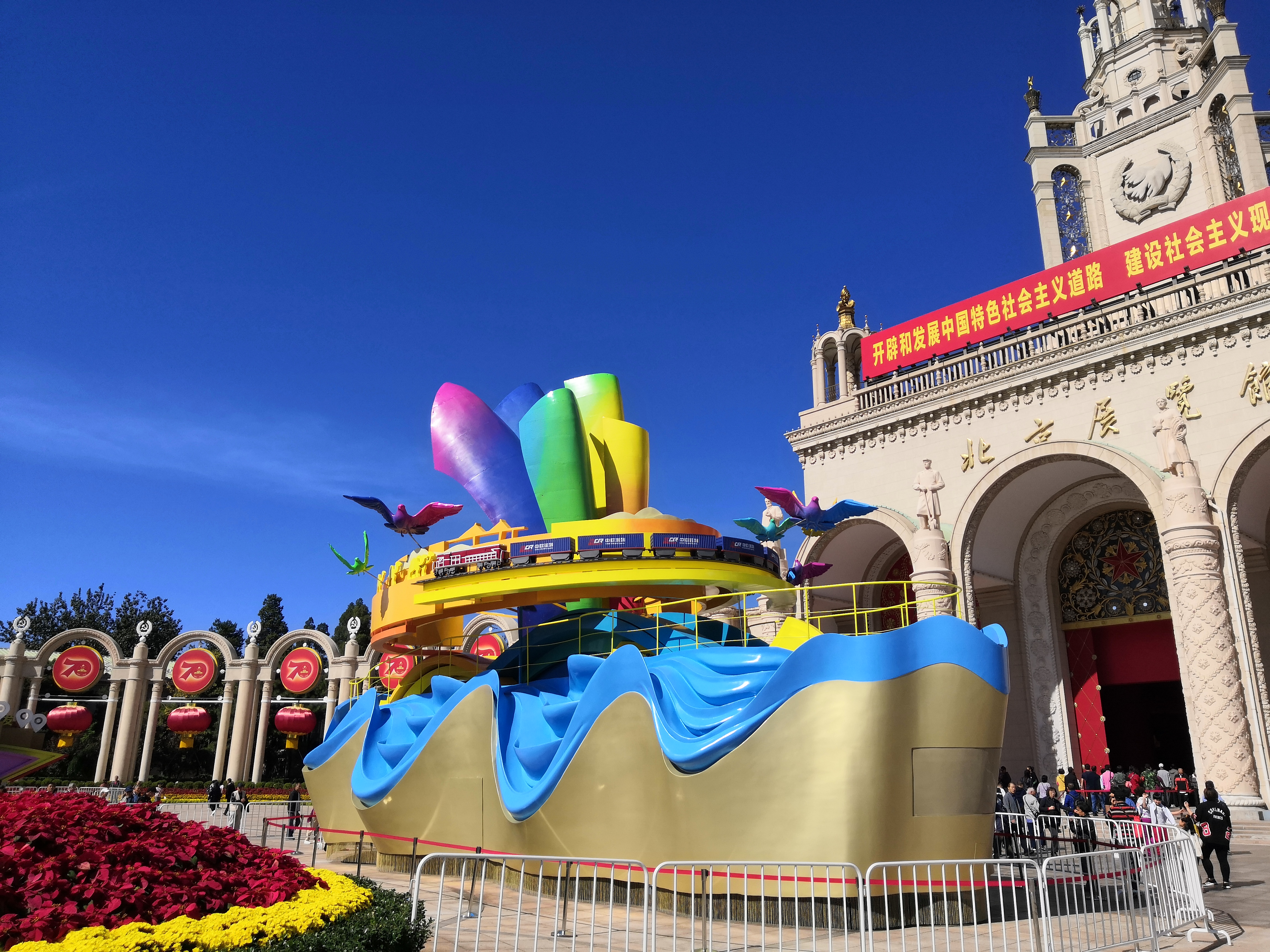
"Community of Common Destiny" theme exhibition vehicle

Community of common destiny for mankind, officially translated as community with a shared future for mankind or human community with a shared future, is a political slogan used by the Chinese Communist Party (CCP) to describe a stated foreign-policy goal of the People's Republic of China. The phrase was first used by former CCP general secretary Hu Jintao and has been frequently cited by current CCP general secretary Xi Jinping. "Shared future" has become the CCP's preferred translation over "common destiny," as the latter arguably implies a predetermined path. The phrase was included in the CCP constitution in 1997, and the preamble of the state constitution when it was amended in 2018.

== Usage by the CCP ==
The CCP has used this slogan to express its aim of creating a “new framework” of international relations which would promote and improve global governance. Some Chinese analysts have hailed the expression as the first major amendment of China's foreign policy in more than four decades, shifting from being nation-oriented to focusing on the whole of humankind. By 2023, the slogan had become China's most important foreign policy formulation in the Xi Jinping era. As part of its effort to develop the Chinese Dream, China seeks to use to the slogan as a mechanism to expand its network of foreign relationships. According to The Economist, the Chinese government moved away from the slogan's literal translation of common destiny to the revised shared future because the former has "a more chilling, deterministic edge" in English.

Chinese government officials have sought international recognition for the slogan and have argued that China will adhere to a peaceful development policy and has no intention to change the international order. Government officials, especially diplomats, use the phrase to create a sense of a mission that is beneficial to other countries and not just China itself.

=== Development ===
The phrase "community of common destiny" first appeared in a report delivered by former CCP General Secretary Hu Jintao to the 17th National Congress of the Chinese Communist Party in 2007, referring to shared blood and common destiny of mainland China and Taiwan. In his 2012 report to the 18th National Congress, Hu broadened the expression by adding “for all mankind” to emphasize that "mankind has only one earth to live on, and countries have only one world to share" and called for the building of a “harmonious world of enduring peace and common prosperity.” Hu envisioned a new type of more equitable and balanced global development partnership that would stick together in times of difficulty, both sharing rights and shouldering obligations, and boosting the common interests of mankind.

When Xi Jinping met with foreigners for the first time after taking office as General Secretary of the CCP in November 2012, he said that the international community has increasingly become a community with shared future, with each having a stake in others.

Xi used the slogan in an international arena at the Moscow State Institute of International Relations in March 2013, and again in a speech to the World Economic Forum in Davos, Switzerland in January 2017, which "won him high credits at home and abroad".

International opposition led to the removal of the phrase from most of the draft resolutions, but it survived in two 2017 resolutions authored by the Chinese delegation: one on "no first placement of weapons in outer space", aimed at preventing an arms race in outer space, and a second on "further practical measures for the prevention of an arms race in outer space." Chinese officials subsequently cited the two UN resolutions in “an attempt to demonstrate that the concept has been broadly accepted by the international community.” However, when similar resolutions were approved in the 2018 session of the General Assembly, the controversial language was removed. Delegations from multiple countries subsequently banded together to oppose Chinese efforts to include the phrase in other multilateral documents.

On March 11, 2018, the constitutional amendment adopted at the first meeting of the 13th National People's Congress of China added a sentence that promoted the building of a community with a shared future while developing diplomatic relations and economic and cultural exchanges with other countries.

In August 2018, Yang Jiechi, wrote that "Building a community of common destiny for mankind is the overall goal of China's foreign affairs work in the new era" and requires a "new type of international relations."

Chinese Foreign Minister Wang Yi used the phrase at the 2020 Munich Security Conference.

The term is frequently used in conjunction with diplomatic initiatives and is also associated with the Belt and Road Initiative.

Since 2019, the Ministry of Education's Institute for a Community with Shared Future (ICSF), hosted at the Communication University of China, has served to promote the concept internationally through multiple affiliated research centers in several countries.

== International usage ==
A map of countries with which China has established community of shared future partnerships

In a speech at the United Nations in 2017, Xi described that principles underpinning the common destiny for humankind as: (1) bolstering the UN as the highest authority in international affairs, (2) equality of sovereignty among countries, which according to Xi entails non-interference with countries' internal affairs and equal rights and opportunities for all countries to participate in international organizations, and (3) democratization of international relations, which Xi contrasted with "hegemonism of one country" or "joint governance by several parties."

Beginning in 2017, Chinese diplomats at the UN sought to have the phrase inserted into several UN General Assembly resolutions. Several other countries, including India and the United States, resisted this language, calling it inappropriate for multilateral resolutions to include the political ideology of one country. As a result of sustained Chinese government's efforts, in 2017 the phrase was incorporated by the United Nations into the resolution on the UN Commission for Social Development. It has also been used by the UN Disarmament Commission, the Human Rights Council, and the UN General Assembly First Commission.

The China–Arab States Cooperation Forum action plan following the 2020 meeting called for preserving the sovereignty and stability of the Arab states based on principles of non-interference and the Community of Shared Future for Mankind.

As part of a group of cooperation agreements announced during a December 2023 visit by Xi to Vietnam, China and Vietnam issued a joint statement to support building a community of shared future for humankind.

== Interpretations ==
According to academics Xu Jin and Guo Chu, the concept initially developed because of China's increasing international economic interests and has since broadened to become increasingly based on political and security understandings.

The British journalist Bill Hayton has argued that the CCP's vision of a "community with a shared future" represents "an attack on the multilateral order of international organizations, alliances and shared sovereignty that has attempted to manage the world since 1945." Some have argued that Xi's community of common destiny for mankind would replace the established international order, grounded in free and sovereign nation-states that abide by commonly accepted international laws, with a unity of nations whose economic dependence on China leads them to defer to Chinese political demands. Historian Steve Tsang states that the concept presumes a Sinocentric vision of tianxia over and above the liberal international order. David Bandurski of the China Media Project stated that the concept is "premised on the supremacy of national sovereignty" over human rights.

Academic Jeremy Garlick writes that the framing of the concept conveys the idea that China can help develop and lead regional groupings of countries which do not depend on the United States or the West for their funding or organization. In this view, the concept signals a shift towards a more active role for China in world affairs.

Academic Chuchu Zhang writes that the concept allows other countries and local bodies in those countries to interpret the concept according to their own developmental priorities, such as economic growth generally, infrastructure development, or regional security.

== See also ==
- China model
- Belt and Road Initiative
- Global Security Initiative
- Ideology of the Chinese Communist Party
