= Huai Jinpeng =

Chinese computer scientist and politician

- 怀进鹏
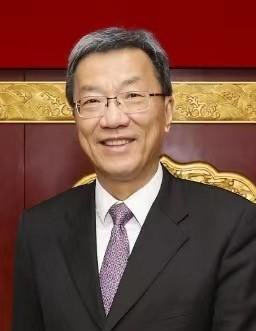
- Huai in 2024

Minister of Education
- Incumbent
- Assumed office 20 August 2021
- Premier: Li Keqiang; Li Qiang
- Preceded by: Chen Baosheng

Party Branch Secretary of the China Association for Science and Technology
- In office September 2017 – July 2021
- Chairman: Wan Gang
- Preceded by: Shang Yong
- Succeeded by: Zhang Yuzhuo

Deputy Communist Party Secretary of Tianjin
- In office December 2016 – September 2017
- Communist Party Secretary: Li Hongzhong
- Preceded by: Wang Dongfeng
- Succeeded by: Yin Hejun

President of Beihang University
- In office May 2009 – March 2015
- Preceded by: Li Wei
- Succeeded by: Xu Huibin

Personal details
- Born: 20 December 1962 (age 62) Harbin, Heilongjiang, China
- Party: Chinese Communist Party
- Education: Beihang University (PhD); Harbin Institute of Technology (MS); Jilin University (BS)

Chinese name
- Simplified Chinese: 怀进鹏
- Traditional Chinese: 懷進鵬
Transcriptions
Standard Mandarin
- Hanyu Pinyin: Huái Jìnpéng

Huai Jinpeng (Chinese: 怀进鹏; pinyin: Huái Jìnpéng; born December 1962) is a Chinese computer scientist and politician who has served as the minister of education since 2021. He previously served as the party secretary of the China Association for Science and Technology (CAST) from 2017 to 2021. He is a former academician of the Chinese Academy of Sciences.

== Biography ==
Huai was born in Harbin but traces his ancestry to Jinan, Shandong province. He graduated from Jilin University of Industry (now merged into Jilin University) in 1984. He joined the Chinese Communist Party in January 1986, and began work in September 1987 after obtaining a computer science master's degree at the Harbin Institute of Technology. In November 1993, he earned a doctorate from Beihang University. He also attended Columbia University as a visiting scholar between 1995 and 1996. In December 2000, he was named deputy party chief and vice president of Beihang University. In May 2009, he was promoted to president of the university, obtaining vice-minister level rank and was elected as a member of the Chinese Academy of Sciences. In 2012, he was awarded the Legion of Honour by the French government for his outstanding contributions to education, science and technology development across China and France.

In February 2015, Huai was named Deputy Minister of Information Technology. In December 2016, Huai was named deputy party chief of Tianjin. In September 2017, Huai was transferred to become party secretary of the China Association for Science and Technology (CAST).

On 20 August 2021, he was appointed Minister of Education.

Huai is a deputy to the 12th National People's Congress and a member of the 19th Central Committee of the Chinese Communist Party.

Educational offices
Preceded by Li Wei	President of Beihang University; 2009–2015	Succeeded by Xu Huibin
Party political offices
Preceded by Wang Dongfeng	Deputy Party Secretary of Tianjin; 2016–2017	Succeeded by Yin Hejun
Preceded by Shang Yong	Party Branch Secretary of the China Association for Science and Technology; 2017–2021	Succeeded by Zhang Yuzhuo
Government offices
Preceded by Chen Baosheng	Minister of Education; 2021-	Incumbent
