= Ma Hong =

Chinese economist (1920–2007)

- 马洪
- Born: Niu Renquan; 13 May 1920; Dingxiang County, Shanxi, China
- Died: 28 October 2007 (aged 87); Beijing, China
- Occupation: Economist

Academic background
- Education: Yan'an Marxist Leninist College

Academic work
- Discipline: Economics
- Sub-discipline: Socialist market economy

Chinese name
- Traditional Chinese: 馬洪
- Simplified Chinese: 马洪
Transcriptions
Standard Mandarin
- Hanyu Pinyin: Mǎ Hóng

Niu Renquan
- Traditional Chinese: 牛仁權
- Simplified Chinese: 牛仁权
Transcriptions
Standard Mandarin
- Hanyu Pinyin: Niú Rénquán

Ma Hong (simplified Chinese: 马洪; traditional Chinese: 馬洪; pinyin: Mǎ Hóng; May 18, 1920 – October 28, 2007) was a well-known economist and was chiefly responsible for the reintroduction of market economics to China. He also pioneered Policy Consultation and chaired a government think tank.

== Early life ==
Ma was born in Dingxiang County, Shanxi, China, on 18 May 1920. Ma Hong took part in Ximenghui in 1936, an organization of resistance against the Japanese. The following year he was involved in the organization of the General Trade Union of Tongpu Railroad, and in that same year joined the Chinese Communist Party (CCP). In 1938, he went to Yan'an, then the CCP revolutionary base area, and won Chen Yun's (Minister of Organization) favor. As a result, he was admitted into the Central Party School of the Chinese Communist Party. After graduation in 1941 Ma Hong was assigned to be a researcher in the CCP's Central Research Institute, laying the foundations of his later economic knowledge. He was transferred the CCP's Northeast Bureau to be the director of the Policy Research Office in 1949. Through investigation Ma Hong wrote "The Structure and Policy of the Northeastern Economy", and divided it into five sectors. This method was long employed by the Chinese government. In 1952 Ma Hong was promoted to the post of General Secretary of the National Planning Committee of the Central Government.

During the Gao-Rau Incident, Ma Hong was purged and demoted. He came to work in the National Economic Committee and was involved in the drafting of the "70 Industrial Regulations", which helped China recover from the Great Leap Forward. After co-composing the regulations Ma Hong wrote the "Management of Chinese Manufacturing Enterprises", which became the compass of industrial management at that time.

== Later years ==
In 1978 Ma Hong's career rebounded and he founded the Industrial Economic Institute, becoming its director. He then became the president of the Chinese Academy of Social Sciences and Deputy General Secretary of the State Council of the People's Republic of China. Ma Hong founded the State Council Development Research Centre, the first of its kind. Late in his career he warned the government of impending inflation, but the government chose to ignore his advice to its detriment.

Ma Hong has published more than 10 books in Chinese; New Strategy of Chinese Economic Development has been translated and edited by Fengbo Zhang and was published in Japan in 1985. His writings have been widely publicized, and in 2005 he won the Outstanding Economist Prize. On October 28, 2007, he died of Parkinson's disease.

Academic offices
| Preceded by Hu Qiaomu | President of the Chinese Academy of Social Sciences; 1982–1985 | Succeeded by Hu Qiaomu |
