= Chen Zhili =

Chinese politician

- 陈至立
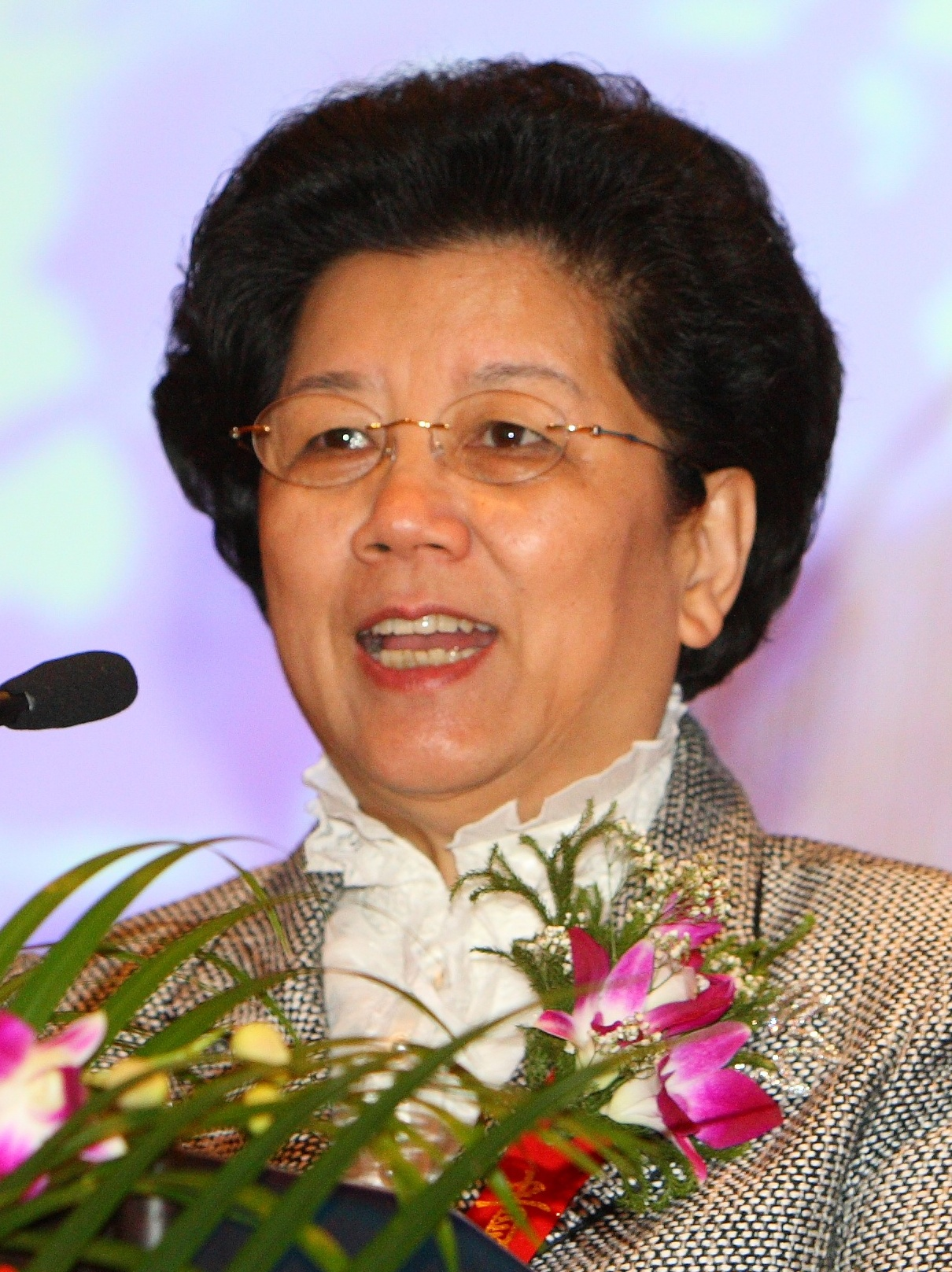
- Chen in 2009

President of the All-China Women's Federation
- In office 31 October 2008 – 7 May 2013
- Preceded by: Gu Xiulian
- Succeeded by: Shen Yueyue

Minister of Education
- In office 10 March 1998 – 17 March 2003
- Preceded by: Zhu Kaixuan
- Succeeded by: Zhou Ji

Personal details
- Born: November 1942 (age 83) Xianyou County, Fujian, Republic of China
- Party: Chinese Communist Party (since 1961)
- Education: Fudan University

Chinese name
- Simplified Chinese: 陈至立
- Traditional Chinese: 陳至立
Transcriptions
Standard Mandarin
- Hanyu Pinyin: Chén Zhìlì

Chen Zhili (Chinese: 陈至立; born November 1942) is a retired senior Chinese politician who served as State Councilor and Minister of Education, and a Vice Chairwoman of the National People's Congress. She was also vice chairwoman of the organization commission of the 2008 Beijing Olympics.

== Biography ==
Born in Xianyou County, Fujian Province, Chen graduated from the department of physics at Fudan University. She pursued her postgraduate degree at Shanghai Institute of Ceramics of Chinese Academy of Sciences, doing research of solid-state physics. Chen joined the Chinese Communist Party ("CCP") in January 1961. At the beginning of the Cultural Revolution, Chen was sent to work in an army farm for two years before returning to the Institute. In 1982, she was at Penn State University in the United States as a visiting scholar. After that, she was elevated to vice Party Chief of the Institute, and thus transformed from a scholar to a CCP official.

Chen's former posts in Shanghai included vice secretary and later, secretary of the CCP committee of Shanghai Science and Technology Commission, director of the Publicity Department of Shanghai, and vice secretary of CCP Shanghai committee. During her tenure in Shanghai, Jiang Zemin, Zhu Rongji, Wu Bangguo and Huang Ju served as Shanghai's Party chief.

In August 1997, Chen was transferred to central government and appointed as vice director and leader of Party group of National Education Commission. In 1998, she became the Minister of Education. In 2003, she was further elevated to the position of State Councilor, in charge of education, culture and sports. In March 2008, Chen was elected a Vice Chairperson of the National People's Congress. On April 12, 2008, she was appointed as governor of Beijing Olympic Village.

Chen was an alternate member of 13th and 14th Central Committees of the Chinese Communist Party, and a full member of 15th, 16th, 17th Central Committees.

Government offices
Preceded by Zhu Kaixuan	Minister of Education; 1998–2003	Succeeded by Zhou Ji
Preceded by Gu Xiulian	President of the All-China Women's Federation; 2008–2013	Succeeded by Shen Yueyue
