= Telling China's story well =

Chinese Communist Party slogan

- Simplified Chinese: 讲好中国的故事
- Traditional Chinese: 講好中國的故事
Transcriptions
Standard Mandarin
- Hanyu Pinyin: Jiǎng hǎo Zhōngguó de gùshì

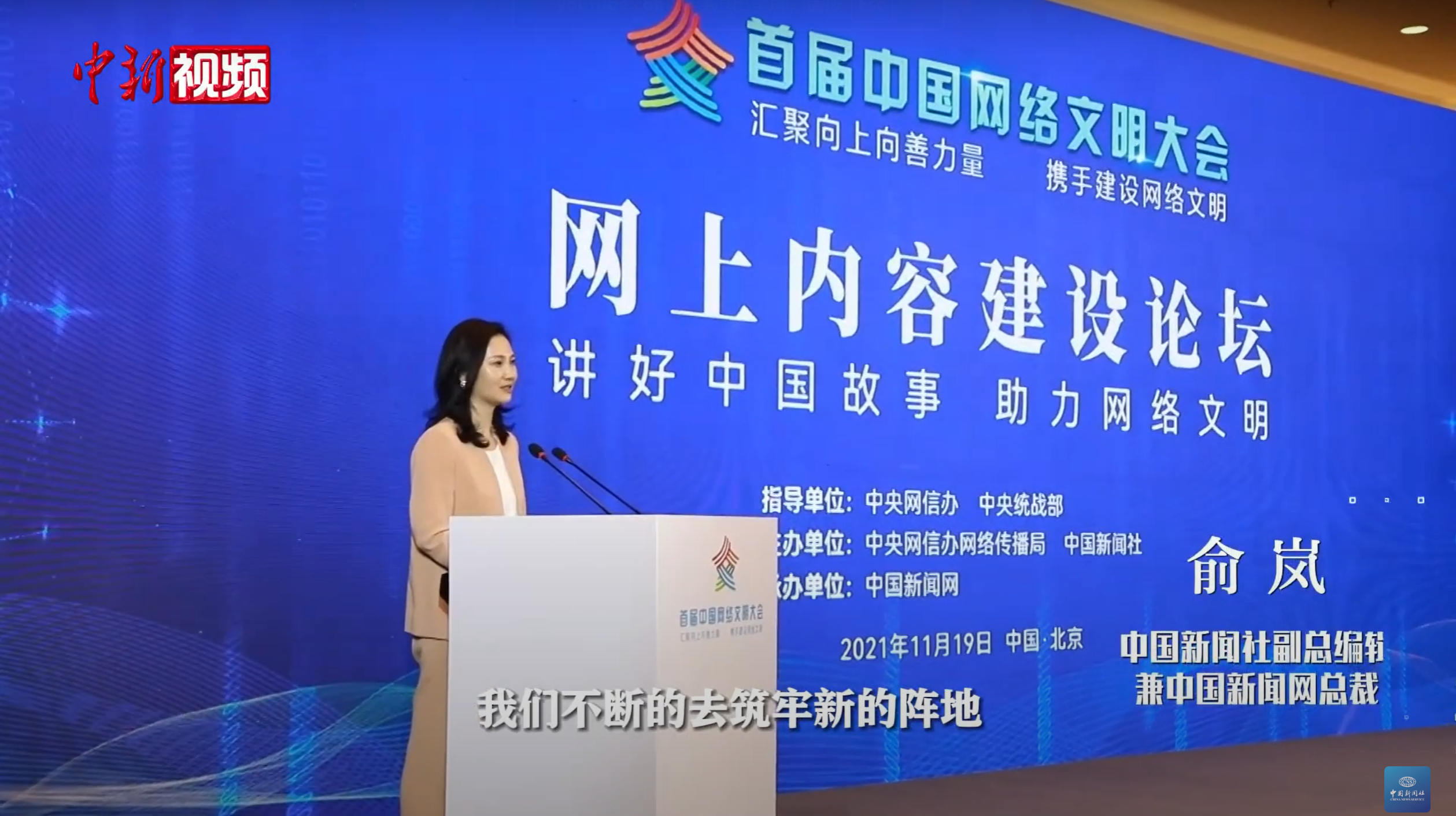
On November 19, 2021, the inaugural China Network Civilization Conference Online Content Building Forum took place in Beijing, centered on the theme of Telling China's Stories Well to Foster Network Civilization.

Telling China's story well is a Chinese Communist Party (CCP) political slogan regarding its external propaganda efforts. It was proposed by CCP general secretary Xi Jinping in 2013.

== Usage ==
In an article written in the People's Daily in 2020, head of the Fujian Provincial Committee of the All-China Women's Federation Xu Shana described the meaning of telling China's story well. She wrote "the core of telling 'China's story' is the "story of the Chinese Communist Party, and the crux of telling the story of the Chinese Communist Party well is properly explaining why the CCP 'can'." She continues by writing media should "clearly speak to why history and the people would choose the Chinese Communist Party, showing the political advantages of adhering to the leadership of the Party." She continues by describing the slogan as telling stories about "the struggle of the Chinese people to fulfil their dream", referring to Xi's concept of the Chinese Dream. She says the story of the "great struggle of the Chinese people" has appeal in other countries because it is about "a dream of peace, development, cooperation and win-win". She also emphasizes using "China's excellent traditional culture", which she describes as "China's deepest source of cultural soft power", to spread China's image around the world. She concludes by writing that it is in the fundamental interests of the world to build a Community of Common Destiny. She says that to do this, Chinese media must "break through" the notion that "countries that strengthen must seek hegemony", which she associates with the "China threat theory".

== History ==
=== Establishment ===
The slogan was first coined by CCP general secretary Xi Jinping on 19 August 2013, during a speech he gave to the 2013 National Conference on Publicity and Ideology Work. In February 2016, Xi gave a speech at a media symposium, where he said "we must tell the story of socialism with Chinese characteristics, the story of the Chinese dream, the story of the Chinese people, the story of China's excellent culture, and the story of China's peaceful development". As part of Xi's efforts, numerous international communication centers have been established by provinces and municipalities.

=== Development ===
Since January 2018, the Chinese People's Association for Friendship with Foreign Countries (CPAFFC) has undertaken a public diplomacy research project titled Telling China's stories, which gathered experiences nationwide and selected 33 cases from a total of 117, categorizing them into three segments: culture, narratives, and romantic engagements, culminating in the compilation How to Tell China's Stories. It was published and distributed by the Commercial Press in April 2019.

At the National Conference on Publicity and Ideology Work in Beijing in August 2018, Xi stated the importance of "telling China's stories well and disseminating a positive Chinese narrative."

In September 2019, an official "Database of Telling China's Stories Well" was organized by Xinhua News Agency and undertaken by Chinaso.com of Xinhua.

In May 2021, during the 30th collective study session of the 19th Politburo of the Chinese Communist Party, Xi Jinping emphasized "Telling China's stories, amplifying China's voice, and portraying an authentic, multidimensional, and comprehensive image of China as crucial endeavors in enhancing the nation's international communication capabilities."

In November 2021, the inaugural China Internet Civilization Conference Online Content Construction Forum (Chinese: 中国网络文明大会网上内容建设论坛) took place in Beijing, co-organized by the Network Communication Bureau of the Cyberspace Administration of China and the China News Service, with state media representatives deliberating on strategies to advance the concept. In 2022, Xi said that the CCP must:

Collect and refine the defining symbols and best elements of Chinese culture and showcase them to the world. Accelerate the development of China's discourse and narrative systems, tell China's story well, make China's voice heard, and present a China that is worthy of trust, adoration, and respect. Strengthen our international communications capabilities, make our communications more effective, and strive to strengthen China's discursive power in international affairs so that it is commensurate with our composite national strength and international status.

The 2023 China Internet Civilization Conference took place in Xiamen, Fujian Province, on July 18, 2023. Li Shulei, the Minister of the Publicity Department of the Chinese Communist Party, participated in and presented a keynote address to further advance China's narrative efforts.

== See also ==
- Ideology of the Chinese Communist Party
- Soft power of China
