= Zhang Yutai =

Chinese politician (1945–2026)

- 张玉台

Executive Deputy Director and Secretary-General of the China National Committee for the Wellbeing of the Next Generation
- In office -

Personal details
- Born: September 1945 Tancheng, Shandong, China
- Died: 24 July 2026 (aged 80) Beijing, China
- Party: Chinese Communist Party
- Education: Beijing Institute of Aeronautics

Zhang Yutai (Note: simplified Chinese: 张玉台; traditional Chinese: 張玉台; pinyin: Zhāng Yùtái) (September 1945 – 24 July 2026) was a Chinese politician. He served as the director and leader of the Chinese Communist Party group of Development Research Center of the State Council of the PRC.

== Life and career ==
Born in Tancheng County, Shandong in September 1945, Zhang graduated from the department of computer science at the Beijing Institute of Aeronautics in 1968. He was then sent to work at a farm in the Shenyang Military Region. From 1970, he conducted research at the Institute of Semiconductors at the Chinese Academy of Sciences. In 1980, he began to serve in the National Commission of Science and Technology, and was the vice director of general office of the Commission. In 1985, he became the vice director of Science and Technology Leading Group Office of the State Council. From 1988, he served in Chinese Academy of Sciences, and was the vice secretary-general and director of associated office, president and editor-in-chief of the newspaper agency "Chinese Science". In January 1995, Zhang served in China Association of Science and Technology, and was the leader of the Party group, vice president and the first secretary of the secretariat. In October 2004, Zhang was appointed vice director and leader of the Party group of Development Research Center of the State Council. Since June 2007, Zhang has served as director and leader of the Party group of the Center.

Zhang was a member of the 16th and 17th Central Committee of the Chinese Communist Party. He was also a standing committee member of the 9th National People's Congress, and a member of law committee.

Zhang died on 24 July 2026, at the age of 80.

== Notes ==
Assembly seats
Preceded by Xu Guanhua	Chairman of the Committee for Education, Science, Health and Sports of the CPPCC National Committee; 12th CPPCC; 2013–2018	Succeeded by Yuan Guiren
Government offices
Preceded by Wang Mengkui	Director of the Development Research Center of the State Council; June 2007 – April 2011	Succeeded by Li Wei
