= Chen Baosheng =

Chinese politician

- 陈宝生
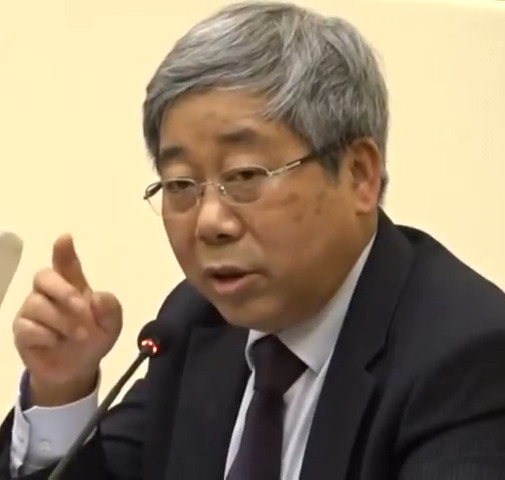

Minister of Education
- In office 2 July 2016 – 20 August 2021
- Premier: Li Keqiang
- Preceded by: Yuan Guiren
- Succeeded by: Huai Jinpeng

Personal details
- Born: May 1956 (age 70) Lanzhou, Gansu, China
- Party: Chinese Communist Party
- Education: Peking University; Central Party School of the Chinese Communist Party

Chinese name
- Simplified Chinese: 陈宝生
- Traditional Chinese: 陳寶生
Transcriptions
Standard Mandarin
- Hanyu Pinyin: Chén Bǎoshēng

Chen Baosheng (Chinese: 陈宝生; pinyin: Chén Bǎoshēng; born May 1956) is a Chinese politician and academic administrator. He was once the Minister of Education, and the party chief and vice-president of the China National School of Administration and vice-president of the Central Party School of the Chinese Communist Party.

Chen was born in Lanzhou, Gansu province. He has been a member of the Chinese Communist Party (CCP) since 1984. He has degree from Peking University in political economics. He worked in Gansu province, working in policy research and economic development. He was the CCP Committee Secretary of Jiuquan prior to the area's conversion to a prefecture-level city. In April 2002 he was named to the provincial Party Standing Committee of Gansu, then became the head of the provincial propaganda department. In November 2004 he was named party chief of Lanzhou. In June 2008 he was transferred to Beijing to become vice-president of the CCP Central Party School. On March 20, 2013, he became the party chief and vice-president of the China National School of Administration. On July 2, 2016, he was appointed as Minister of Education.

He has been an alternate of the 17th Central Committee of the Chinese Communist Party and a full member of the 18th and the 19th Central Committees.

Party political offices
Preceded by Chen Xueheng	Communist Party Secretary of Jiuquan; 1999–2002	Succeeded by Yang Yurogn
Preceded by Ma Xilin	Head of Propaganda Department of Gansu Provincial Committee of the Chinese Communist Party; 2002–2004	Succeeded by Li Xiaojie
Preceded by Wang Jun	Communist Party Secretary of Lanzhou; 2004–2008	Succeeded by Lu Wucheng
Government offices
Preceded by Yuan Guiren	Minister of Education; 2016–2021	Succeeded by Huai Jinpeng
