= Jiang Nanxiang =

Chinese politician (1913–1988)

- 蒋南翔
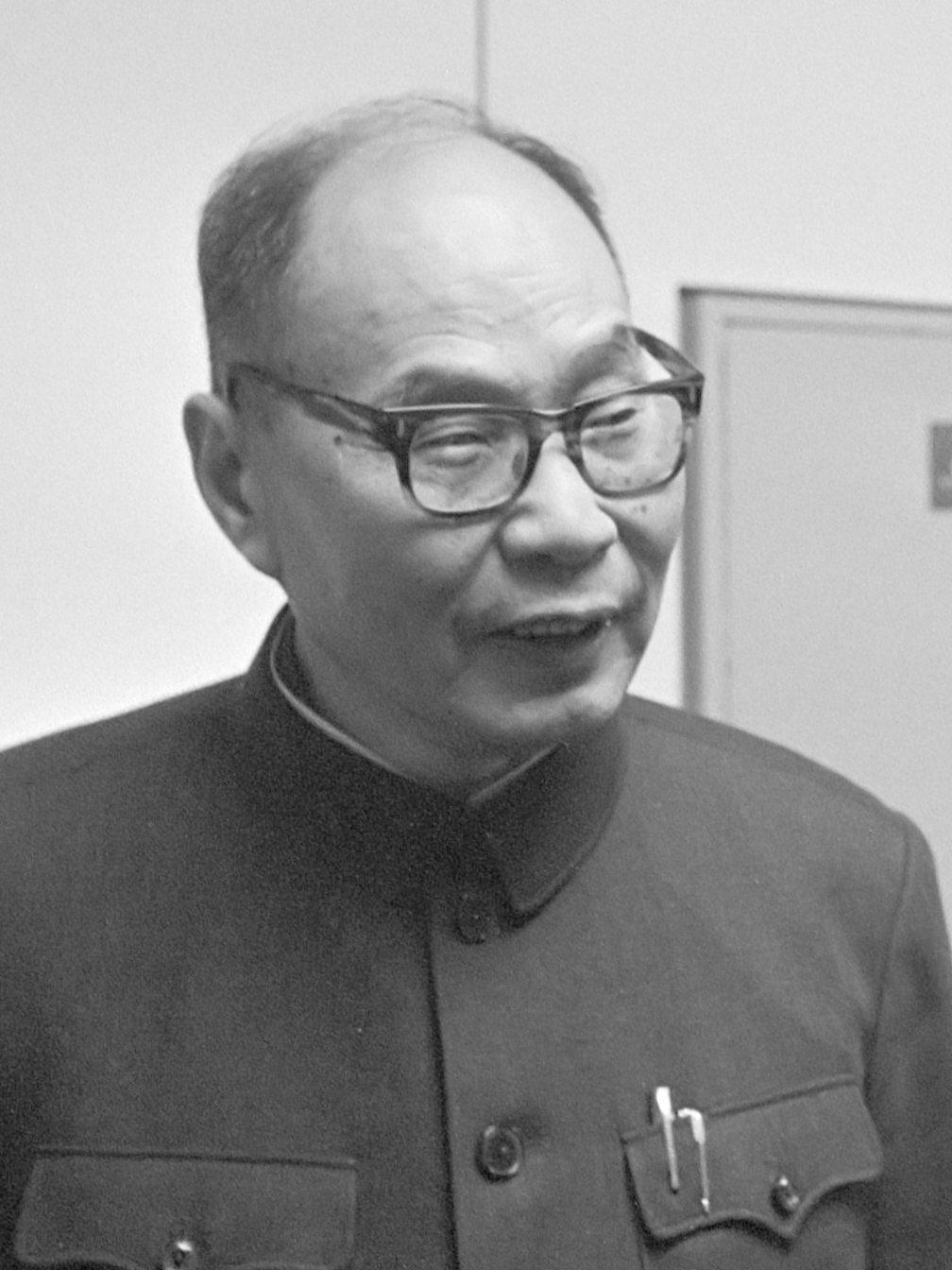

Minister of Higher Education of the People's Republic of China
- In office 1965–1966
- Premier: Zhou Enlai
- Succeeded by: Office abolished
- Preceded by: Office established

Personal details
- Born: 7 September 1913; Yixing County, Jiangsu, China
- Died: 3 May 1988 (aged 74); Beijing, China
- Political party: Chinese Communist Party
- Spouse: Qu Tangliang
- Children: 3

Jiang Nanxiang (Chinese: 蒋南翔, 7 September 1913 – 3 May 1988) was a Chinese politician and the Minister of Higher Education.

== Biography ==
Entered Jiangsu Zhenjiang Middle School in 1929. Entered the Chinese Department of Tsinghua University in 1932. Served as party branch secretary of Tsinghua University and secretary of the Beijing Municipal Party Committee. After the outbreak of the Anti-Japanese War in 1937, he served as a member of the Youth Committee of the Northern Bureau of the Central Committee of the Chinese Communist Party and the Yangtze River Bureau, party secretary of the Student Union of the All-China Students Federation, youth secretary of the Southern Bureau of the CCP Central Committee, and minister of propaganda of the Youth Work Committee of the CCP Central Committee. After the Second Sino-Japanese War, he served as youth secretary of the Northeast Bureau of the CCP Central Committee. Since 1949, he served as deputy director of the Preparatory Committee of the Communist Youth League of China and deputy secretary of the Secretariat of the Central Committee of the Communist Youth League.

He served as the president of Tsinghua University from November 1952 to June 1966, and concurrently served as the party secretary of Tsinghua University from May 1956 to June 1966. On June 8, 1957, the People's Daily published an editorial entitled "Why?", which sounded the clarion call for the organization of forces to counter the attacks of rightists across the country. This day was designated as the official start of the "Anti-Rightist Movement".

During his tenure at Tsinghua University, Jiang Nanxiang established the student political counselor system at Tsinghua University in 1953. Based on this, a group of political leaders at Tsinghua have had an important influence on China's political situation in recent years, including the current situation. His philosophy tends to be in favor of the Soviet Union's higher education model, and he proposed a model of cultivating "red and professional" and "red engineers". In the early 1950s, Tsinghua University in mainland China carried out department adjustment, and Tsinghua's liberal arts and science departments were all merged into Peking University and other schools. Some precious ancient books in Tsinghua Library were also to be transferred. However, after Jiang Nanxiang took office, he stopped this move in time, which played a role in Tsinghua's restoration of liberal arts and history disciplines in the 1980s.

From January 1965 to July 1966, he served as Minister of the Ministry of Higher Education of the People's Republic of China. During the Cultural Revolution, Wang Guangmei was criticized. On April 10, 1967, the Red Guards of Tsinghua University held a mass meeting of 10,000 people to criticize her. Jiang Nanxiang, Peng Zhen, Lu Dingyi, and Bo Yibo participated in the criticism.

He had served as secretary of the Tianjin Municipal Committee of the Chinese Communist Party, deputy director of the State Science and Technology Commission, first vice president of the CCP Central Party School, alternate member of the 8th Central Committee of the Chinese Communist Party, member of the 11th and 12th Central Committees of the CCP, and member of the Central Advisory Commission and other positions. From May 28 to 30, 1983, the China Higher Education Society held its founding conference in Beijing. The conference elected the first board of directors and he served as president.

Died in Beijing on 3 May 1988.
