= Ministry of Education (China) =

Chinese central government education agency

Ministry of Education of the People's Republic of China
- 中华人民共和国教育部
- Logo of the Ministry

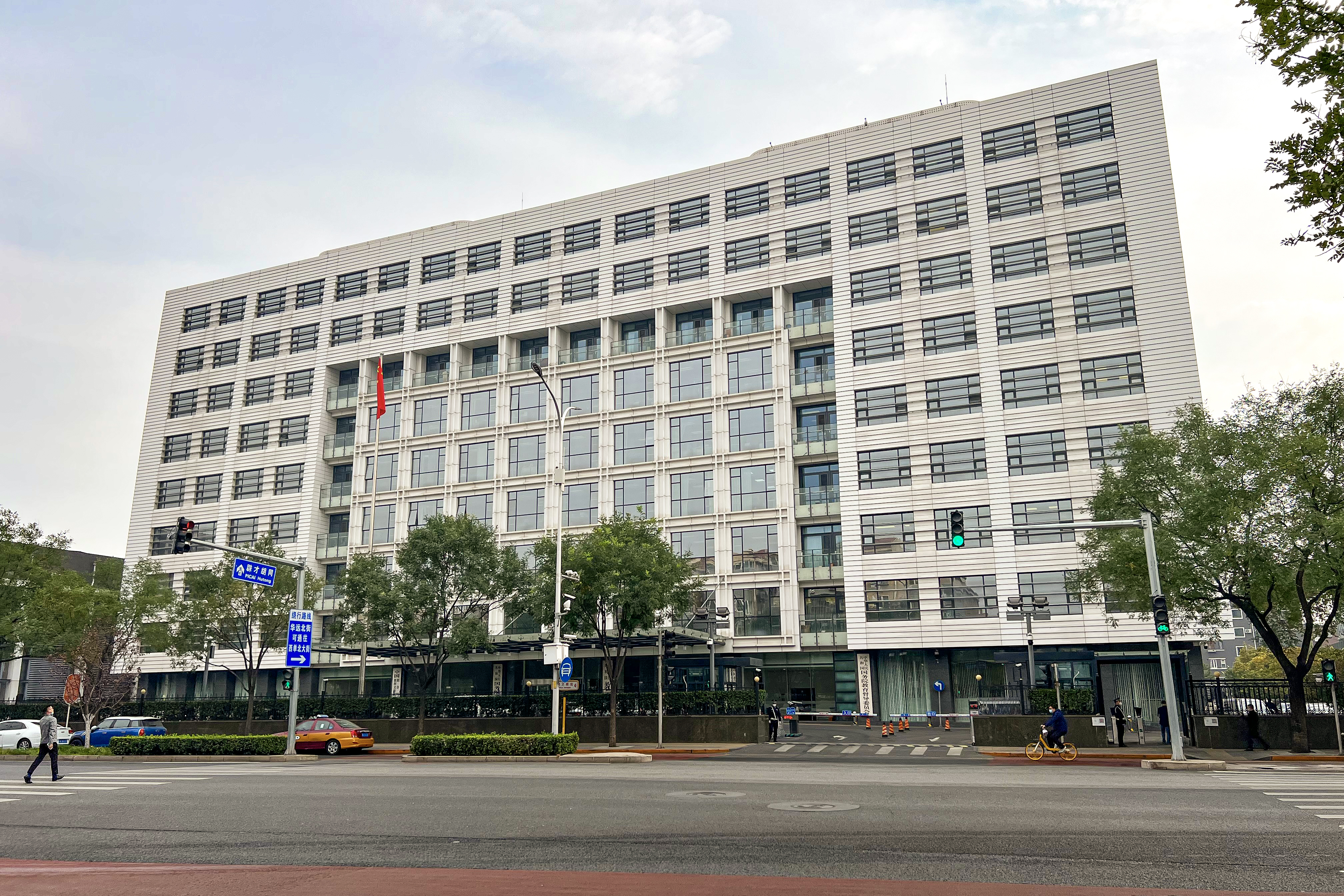
- Ministry of Education headquarters in the Xicheng district of Beijing

Agency overview
- Formed: October 1949; 77 years ago
- Preceding agencies: Ministry of Education of the Central People's Government (1949–1985); State Education Commission (1985–1998)
- Type: Constituent Department of the State Council (cabinet-level executive department)
- Jurisdiction: Government of China
- Headquarters: Beijing
- Annual budget: CN¥5.3 trillion (2020)
- Minister responsible: Huai Jinpeng, Minister of Education
- Parent agency: State Council
- Child agencies: Hanban; China Scholarship Council; National Education Examinations Authority
- Website: en.moe.gov.cn

The Ministry of Education of the People's Republic of China is a constituent department of the State Council, responsible for basic education, vocational education, higher education, and other educational affairs throughout the country. The Ministry of Education acts as the predominant funder of national universities and colleges in China. The ministry also accredits tertiary institutions, degree curriculum, and school teachers of the country.

The Ministry of Education currently has 19 internal departments and bureaus. As of 2022, there were 75 colleges and universities affiliated with the Ministry of Education.

== History ==
The Ministry of Education was founded in October 1949. The work of the ministry was overseen by the Culture and Education Commission that was created at the same time. On October 19, writer and poet Guo Moruo was made the director of the commission, and linguist Ma Xulun was made the first education minister of the People's Republic of China.

In February 1958, the Ministry of Higher Education was merged into the Ministry of Education. In July 1964, the Ministry of Higher Education was restored. In July 1966, the Ministry of Higher Education was once again merged into the Ministry of Education.

In June 1970, the Central Committee of the Chinese Communist Party decided to abolish the Ministry of Education and establish the Science and Education Group of the State Council.

The Ministry of Education was restored after the disruptions of the Cultural Revolution in 1975 by the 4th National People's Congress. Until the Ministry's 1975 restoration, the State Council's Science and Education Group was the most important government body in the education bureaucracy.

On June 18, 1985, the Eleventh Standing Committee of the 6th National People's Congress decided to abolish the Ministry of Education and establish the National Education Commission of the People's Republic of China.

In 1998, the Decision on Institutional Reform of the State Council was adopted at the First Session of the 9th National People's Congress, and the National Education Commission was renamed the Ministry of Education.

In 2003, China's Ministry of Education called for adding environmental education content throughout the public school curriculum from the first year of primary school through the second year of high school. Its guidelines on environmental education emphasized firsthand experience and recommended that a quarter of environmental education content should consist of "practice activities".

In 2019, the Ministry issued a new regulation aimed at unifying the teaching materials for primary and middle schools across China in areas including history, language, and politics.

Since 2019, the Ministry of Education's Institute for a Community with Shared Future (ICSF), hosted at the Communication University of China, has served to promote the concept of "community of a share future for mankind" internationally through multiple affiliated research centers in several countries.

Beginning in 2019, the Ministry establishes "integrated research platforms" at universities in China to conduct research on scientific areas deemed as national strategic needs.

In 2022, the Ministry released opinions on developing "organized scientific research" as a means of promoting "high-level self-reliance and self-empowerment." These opinions described universities as a major component of "national strategic scientific and technological strength" in "accelerating major breakthroughs in goal-oriented research" and pursuing "key core technologies".

=== Development of the political counselor system ===
In 1952, the Ministry of Education sought to develop a system of political counselors as a pilot program in universities. Tsinghua University established a political counselor program in 1953, becoming the first university to do so. In this program, new graduates who were also Chinese Communist Party members worked as political counselors in managing the student body and student organizations, often simultaneously serving as Communist Youth League secretaries.

The program was interrupted by the Cultural Revolution but resumed in 1977. After its endorsement by Deng Xiaoping, the program expanded across higher educational institutions.

Beginning in the 1990s, the political counselor system was further institutionalized and expanded in higher educational institutions throughout China, with the ministry issuing standardized rules such as term limits and age limits in 2000.

== Organizational structure ==
According to the "Regulations on the Main Functional Configuration, Internal Organizations and Staffing of the Ministry of Education," the Ministry of Education has set up the following institutions:

=== Internal departments ===
- General Department
- Department of Policies and Regulations
- Development Planning Department
- Comprehensive Reform Department
- Personnel Department
- Finance Department
- Teaching Materials Bureau (Office of the National Teaching Materials Committee)
- Department of Basic Education
- Off-campus Education and Training Supervision Department
- Department of Vocational and Adult Education
- Higher Education Department
- Education Supervision Bureau (Office of the State Council Education Supervision Commission)
- Department of Ethnic Education
- Department of Teacher Affairs
- Department of Physical Education, Health and Arts Education
- Ideological and Political Work Department
- Social Sciences Division
- Department of Science, Technology and Information Technology
- Department of College and University Students
- Department of Degree Management and Graduate Education (Office of the Academic Degrees Committee of the State Council)
- Language and Words Application Management Department
- Language and Words Information Management Department
- Department of International Cooperation and Exchange (Hong Kong, Macao and Taiwan Office)
- Office of the Inspector
- Party Committee of the Ministry of Education
- Retired Cadres Bureau
- Secretariat of the Chinese National Commission for UNESCO

=== Affiliate national bureau ===
- National Language and Words Work Committee (Deputy Ministerial Level)

=== Affiliate public institutions ===
- Ministry of Education Service Center
- National Institute of Educational Administration
- Chinese Academy of Educational Sciences (Office of the National Educational Science Planning Leading Group)
- Research Center for Scientific Development of Higher Education Institutions of the Ministry of Education
- Vocational Education Development Center of the Ministry of Education
- Chinese and Foreign Language Exchange and Cooperation Center of the Ministry of Education
- Institute of Language and Character Applications (State Language Commission Putonghua and Character Application Testing Center)
- National Open University (National University for the Elderly)
- Educational Technology and Resource Development Center of the Ministry of Education (Central Audio-visual Education Center, Basic Education Resource Center of the Ministry of Education)
- China Educational Television
- Ministry of Education Education Management Information Center
- Curriculum Materials Research Institute
- Secretariat of China Scholarship Council
- Ministry of Education Fund Supervision Affairs Center
- National Education Development Center of the Ministry of Education
- China Education Press Agency
- Educational Examination Agency of the Ministry of Education (Teacher Qualification Examination Center of the Ministry of Education, International Educational Measurement Exchange and Cooperation Center)
- Ministry of Education Study Abroad Service Center (China Study Abroad Service Center)
- National Student Financial Aid Management Center
- Ministry of Education Student Services and Quality Development Center
- Degree and Graduate Education Development Center of the Ministry of Education
- Education Quality Assessment Center of the Ministry of Education
- Chinese and Foreign Cultural Exchange Center of the Ministry of Education
- Ministry of Education Communication and Education Center

==== Affiliate higher education institutions ====
There are 75 colleges and universities affiliated with the Ministry of Education.

- Beijing
  - Beijing Foreign Language University
  - Beijing Forestry University
  - Beijing Jiaotong University
  - Beijing Language and Culture University
  - Beijing Normal University
  - Beijing University of Chemical Technology
  - Beijing University of Chinese Medicine
  - Beijing University of Posts and Telecommunications
  - Central Academy of Drama
  - Central Academy of Fine Arts
  - Central Conservatory of Music
  - Central University of Finance and Economics
  - China Agricultural University
  - China University of Geosciences (Beijing)
  - China University of Mining (Beijing)
  - China University of Petroleum (Beijing)
  - China University of Political Science and Law
  - Communication University of China
  - North China Electric Power University
  - Peking University
  - Renmin University of China
  - Tsinghua University
  - Foreign Economic and Trade University
  - University of Science and Technology Beijing
- Tianjin
  - Nankai University
  - Tianjin University
- Liaoning
  - Dalian University of Technology
  - Northeastern University
- Jilin
  - Jilin University
  - Northeast Normal University
- Shanghai
  - Donghua University
  - East China Normal University
  - East China University of Science and Technology
  - Fudan University
  - Shanghai International Studies University
  - Shanghai Jiao Tong University
  - Shanghai University of Finance and Economics
  - Tongji University
- Jiangsu
  - China Pharmaceutical University
  - China University of Mining
  - Hohai University
  - Jiangnan University
  - Nanjing Agricultural University
  - Nanjing University
  - Southeast University
- Zhejiang: Zhejiang University
- Fujian: Xiamen University
- Shandong
  - China University of Petroleum (East China)
  - Shandong University
- Hubei
  - Huazhong Normal University
  - China University of Geosciences (Wuhan)
  - Huazhong Agricultural University
  - Huazhong University of Science and Technology
  - Wuhan University of Technology
  - Wuhan University
  - Zhongnan University of Economics and Law
- Hunan
  - Central South University
  - Hunan University
- Guangdong
  - South China University of Technology
  - Sun Yat-sen University
- Chongqing
  - Chongqing University
  - Southwest University
- Sichuan
  - Sichuan University
  - Southwest Jiaotong University
  - Southwestern University of Finance and Economics
  - University of Electronic Science and Technology of China
- Shaanxi
  - Chang'an University
  - Northwest A&F University
  - Shaanxi Normal University
  - Xi'an Jiaotong University
  - Xi'an University of Electronic Science and Technology
- Gansu: Lanzhou University
- Qingdao: Ocean University of China
- Heilongjiang: Northeast Forestry University
- Anhui: Hefei University of Technology

=== Affiliate enterprises ===
- China Education Publishing and Media Group Co., Ltd.
  - People's Education Press Co., Ltd.
  - Higher Education Press Ltd.
  - Chinese Language Publishing House Co., Ltd.
    - Language and Culture Press
    - China Audio and Video Publishing House
- Educational Science Press Co., Ltd.

The Ministry has a role in the foreign aid process thorough scholarships it provides for study in China.

== See also ==
- Education in China
- History of education in China
- List of universities in China
- English Medium Medical Schools
- Guozijian
