= Ma Xulun =

Chinese politician, activist, and linguist

- Simplified Chinese: 马叙伦
- Traditional Chinese: 馬敘倫
Transcriptions
Standard Mandarin
- Hanyu Pinyin: Mǎ Xùlún
- Wade–Giles: Ma3 Hsü4-lun2

Yichu
- Chinese: 彝初
Transcriptions
Standard Mandarin
- Hanyu Pinyin: Yíchū
- Wade–Giles: I2-ch'u1

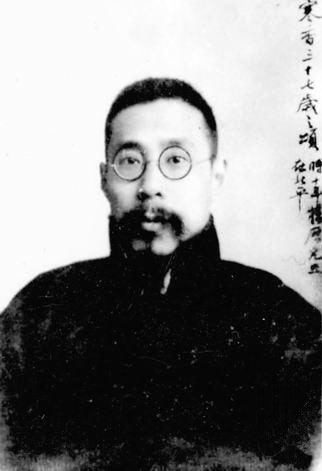
Ma Xulun as a professor at Peking University.

Ma Xulun (simplified Chinese: 马叙伦; traditional Chinese: 馬敘倫; Wade–Giles: Ma Hsü-lun, 27 April 1885 – 4 May 1970), courtesy name Yichu (Chinese: 彝初), was a Chinese politician, activist, and linguist. He was one of the co-founders of the China Association for Promoting Democracy.

== Early life ==
Ma Xulun was an early member of the Tongmenghui. He also joined the South Society founded by Liu Yazi. In 1913, Ma founded Great Republican Daily together with Zhang Taiyan, and became the newspaper's editor-in-chief. In 1913, Ma became a professor at Peking University. During the May Fourth Movement, he was elected to be the president of the Union of Peking High School and College Faculty. In 1921, Ma was appointed as director of education of Zhejiang Province. After the reforms of Beiyang Government, Ma returned to Peking and became twice Deputy Minister of Education. Ma joined Kuomintang in 1923. After the March 18 Massacre, Ma was wanted for opposing Duan Qirui, and fled to Zhejiang. There, Ma called the province governor to support the Northern Expedition against Sun Chuanfang, and was wanted again. After the Kuomintang secured Zhejiang, Ma became Zhejiang's director of civil affairs. He returned to the post of Deputy Minister of Education in 1928.

After the Mukden Incident, Ma Xulun founded North China People's Union for Saving the Motherland (华北民众救国联合会), and Peking Cultural Society's Union for Saving the Motherland (北平文化界救国会). In 1936, he persuaded Sichuan warlord Liu Xiang to avoid a civil war and support the war against Japan. After the Marco Polo Bridge Incident, Ma moved to Shanghai and devoted himself to writing.

== After World War II ==
In 1945, Ma Xulun co-founded the China Association for Promoting Democracy along with Xu Guangping, Zhou Jianren and Zhao Puchu. On 5 May 1946, 52 organizations formed the Shanghai Union of People's Organizations (上海人民团体联合会), and Ma became a member of its standing committee. From 1945 to 1947, Ma also published more than 100 political commentaries on newspapers such as Wenhui Bao.

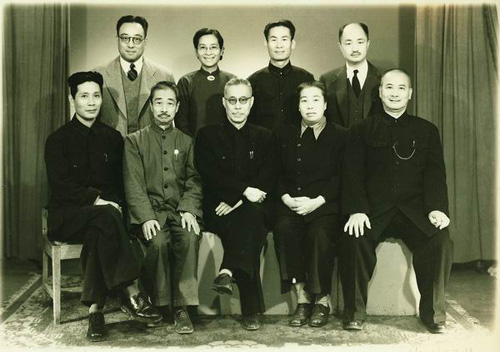
In September 1949, Ma Xulun was seated in the middle of a group photograph of China Association for Promoting Democracy delegates attending the First plenary session of the Chinese People's Political Consultative Conference.

In late 1947, Ma went to Hong Kong with the help of the Chinese Communist Party. In Hong Kong, Ma voiced his support for the Labor Day Slogan, which formed the basis of the future system of multiparty cooperation and political consultation led by Chinese Communist Party. Shortly after, Ma went to Communist Party controlled regions, and supported Mao Zedong's January 1949 statement on the situation of China. In June and September, he attended the Chinese People's Political Consultative Conference Preparatory Conference and the Chinese People's Political Consultative Conference First Plenary Session, and was responsible for selecting People's Republic of China's national flag, emblem and anthem.

After the establishment of People's Republic of China, Ma Xulun became Minister of Education in 1949 and Minister of Higher Education in 1952. In Ma's view, the major problems of the previous education system were the lack of cadre training, lack of remedial education for adults, the lack of technical training schools needed for national reconstruction, and an elementary school structure which impeded the education of working class children. These concerns were addressed in the 1951 Resolution on the Educational System Reform. In his term, Ma also pushed for the highly influential higher education reform of 1952, which cancelled colleges' autonomy and converted China's education system to one that more closely resembled the Soviet Union, creating a number of specialized colleges.

Ma was also vice-president of the 4th Chinese People's Political Consultative Conference, and an academician of Chinese Academy of Sciences, Department of Philosophy and Social Sciences.

== Works ==
Ma Xulun was an expert in Chinese language linguistics, especially in grammatology and historical phonology. His most notable work was the 2.4 million character long Shuowen Jiezi Liushu Shuzheng. Other works include Liushu Jieli, Zhuangzi Jiaozheng, and Laozi Jiaogu. Ma was also a calligrapher with a unique yingtou xiaokai style.
