= Greater administrative region =

1946–1954 administrative divisions of China

Greater administrative areas of China (with 1952-1953 provincial borders)

Greater administrative regions or greater administrative areas (simplified Chinese: 大行政区; traditional Chinese: 大行政區; pinyin: Dà Xíngzhèng Qū) were top-level administrative divisions in territories controlled by the Chinese Communist Party in Northern China and later the nascent People's Republic of China that directly governed provinces and municipalities. These were the largest-ever political divisions of China and were controlled by the Central People's Government. They were dissolved between June and November 1954.

== History ==
The emergence of large administrative regions stemmed from the wartime needs of the Chinese Communist Party (CCP) during the Chinese Civil War. After the continuation of the Civil War, the areas controlled by the CCP were mostly located in the north, and were independent and scattered, unable to fully control a province. At that time, the administrative levels of the CCP system were usually divided into four levels, namely border areas, administrative regions, special regions, and counties, with corresponding party, government, and military institutions. In 1947, the war situation changed, the areas expanded, and gradually completed the capture of a province. After the merger of the Jin-Cha-Ji Border Area and the Jin- Ji-Lu-Yu Border Area, it had exceeded the scope of a province. Against this background, the North China People's Government which transcended the provincial boundaries, was established in 1948.

By 1950, the large-scale battles of the Chinese Civil War had ended, and the People's Republic of China had taken control of the entire mainland China. The large administrative regions were extended to the whole country. The People's Government of the large administrative region (or the Military and Political Committee) had the dual identity of being an agency dispatched by the Central People's Government and the highest local government. It was a first-level local government and led the people's governments of the provinces, autonomous regions and municipalities directly under the central government within the region. On October 27, 1949, the Central People's Government officially abolished the North China People's Government, which became the first large administrative region people's government to be abolished. The provinces it governed were thenceforth directly controlled by the North China Branch (华北事务部; 華北事務部; Huáběi Shìwù Bù) of the Government Administration Council of the Central People's Government instead. The five provinces and two municipalities under its jurisdiction were directly under the central government. In May 1952, control was again transferred, this time to the North China Administrative Council (华北行政委员会; 華北行政委員會; Huáběi Xíngzhèng Wěiyuánhuì) of the Government Administration Council.

In January 1950, the Central People's Government Council passed the General Rules for the Organization of Provincial People's Governments. Article 1 of the rules stipulated that the Provincial People's Government Committee was the provincial-level local government organ and was directly led by the People's Government Committee of the administrative region in charge; in areas where no administrative region People's Government was established, the Provincial People's Government Committee was directly led by the State Council. Legally, the People's Government of the administrative region was defined as the highest local government organ. In order to strengthen the centralized leadership of the central government, the 19th meeting of the Central People's Government in November 1952 resolved that the People's Government of the administrative region (or the Military and Political Committee) would be changed to the Administrative Committee, which was defined as the representative organ of the central government and no longer the highest local government organ. From December 1952 to February of the following year, six Administrative Committees were established one after another.

Starting in June 1954, the Central People's Government successively abolished the administrative institutions of the major administrative regions, and the central government directly governed the provinces, which was completed by November. The CCP Central Committee Bureau and Military and Political Committee related to the six major administrative regions were abolished, and the six major military regions were split into eleven major military regions. Researchers believe that this was due to the needs of China's economic construction at that time, to strengthen the centralized leadership of the central government and reduce the organizational level of the government, or that it was due to the Gao Gang Affair that occurred in 1953.

== Politics ==
The highest officials of the greater administrative regions were known as chairmen (主席; zhǔxí). (From this historical origin derives the term still used today for the top officials of China's autonomous regions.) Except the Northeast, which was governed by a People's Government, the regions' highest government bodies were Military and Administrative Committees (军政委员会; 軍政委員會; jūnzhèng wěiyuánhuì), which were replaced by administrative councils in November 1952. Several domains in China today retain the same structure of geographic divisions as the GAAs. Military administrative regions, the divisions of some major banks, and civil aviation districts are still divided in the same form as the greater administrative regions.

== List ==
Region	Chinese Simplified Traditional	Initial subdivisions	1st secretary	1st chairman	Capital	Creation	People's gov't creation	Abolished
Hwapei (North China)	华北区 華北區	Hebei, Shanxi, Chahar, Pingyuan, Suiyuan, Beijing, and Tianjin	Liu Shaoqi	Dong Biwu	Beijing	9 May 1948	26 September 1948	7 August 1954
Tongpei (Northeast)	东北区 東北區	Songjiang, Jilin, Heilongjiang, Liaodong, Liaoxi, Rehe, Lüshun-Dalian, Shenyang, Benxi, Anshan, and Fushun	Gao Gang	Gao Gang	Shenyang	August 1946	27 August 1949	19 June 1954
Hwatung (East China)	华东区 華東區	Jiangsu, Zhejiang, Anhui, Fujian, Taiwan, Shandong, Shanghai, and Nanjing	Rao Shushi	Rao Shushi	Shanghai	January 1950		29 August 1954
Chungnan (Central and South)	中南区 中南區	Hubei, Hunan, Henan, Jiangxi, Guangdong, Guangxi, and Hankou	Lin Biao	Lin Biao	Hankou	February 1950		19 June 1954
Hsipei (Northwest)	西北区 西北區	Shaanxi, Gansu, Ningxia, Qinghai, Xinjiang, and Xi'an	Peng Dehuai	Peng Dehuai	Xi'an	January 1950		10 December 1954
Hsinan (Southwest)	西南区 西南區	Sichuan, Guizhou, Yunnan, Xikang, and Chongqing	Deng Xiaoping	Liu Bocheng	Chongqing	February 1950		1 November 1954

Several other large-scale entities governed parts of China's territory during this time and were equivalent to greater administrative regions:

- Inner Mongolia Autonomous Region
- Local Government of Tibet (西藏地方政府; Xīzàng Dìfāng Zhèngfǔ; Hsi-tsang Ti-fang Chêng-fu) i.e. (Kashag)
- The Executive Committee of Qiongyai Minority Nationality Autonomous Region (琼崖少数民族自治区行政委员会; 瓊崖少數民族自治區行政委員會; Qióngyá Shǎoshù Mínzú Zìzhìqū Xíngzhèng Wěiyuánhuì) from 1949, later assigned to Central and South China region; the predecessor of Hainan

== See also ==
- History of the administrative divisions of China
