= Shatian Township =

Shatian Township 沙田乡
- Township
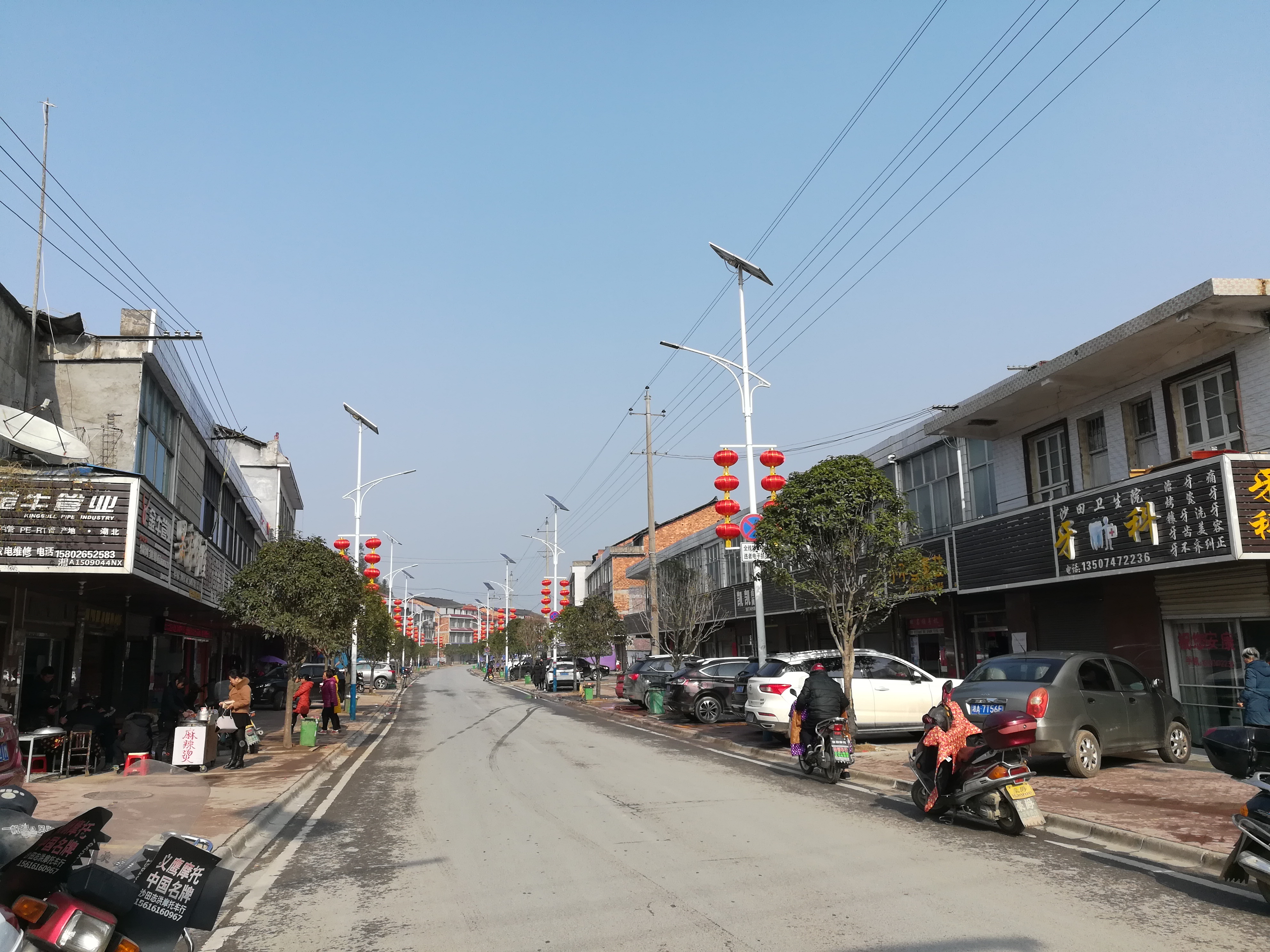
- Street scenes of Shatian Township.

- Location in Hunan
- Coordinates: 28°03′45″N 112°01′57″E
- Country: People's Republic of China
- Province: Hunan
- Prefecture-level city: Changsha
- County-level city: Ningxiang

Area
  - Total: 74.22 km^{2} (28.66 sq mi)

Population
  - Total: 35,000
  - Density: 470/km^{2} (1,200/sq mi)
- Time zone: UTC+08:00 (China Standard)
- Postal code: 410643
- Area code: 0731
- Website: www.nxcity.gov.cn/stx/index.htm

Chinese name
- Traditional Chinese: 沙田鄉
- Simplified Chinese: 沙田乡
Transcriptions
Standard Mandarin
- Hanyu Pinyin: Shātián Xiāng

Shatian Township (Chinese: 沙田乡) is a rural township in Ningxiang City, Hunan Province, China. It is surrounded by Longtian Town and Xiangzikou Town on the west, Huangcai Town on the northeast, Liushahe Town on the southeast, and Qingshanqiao Town on the south. As of the 2000 census it had a population of 28,738 and an area of 74.22 square kilometres (28.66 sq mi).

== Administrative divisions ==
The Town is divided into six villages:

- Shatian (沙田村)
- Shisun (石笋村)
- Baoyun (宝云村)
- Changchong (长冲村)
- Wuli (五里村)
- Shimei (石梅村).

== Geography ==
The township abounds in tea oil and rice wine.

Hongqi Reservoir (红旗水库; 'Red Flag Reservoir') is the largest body of water in the township.

== Economy ==
Chinese chestnut is important to the economy.

== Culture ==
Huaguxi is the most influential form of local theater.

== Transport ==
The County Road X210 passes across the township southeast to northwest.

The County Road X106 passes across the township northeast to southwest.

== Attractions ==
The Huitong Covered Bridge, built in the late Qing dynasty (1644–1911), is a famous scenic spot.

The Former Residence of He Shuheng, built in 1785, in the 50th year of the Kangxi reign, and the Former Residence of Xie Juezai, built in the late Qing dynasty, are scenic spots in the township.

== Notable former residents ==
- Xie Juezai, politician.
- He Shuheng, revolutionary.
- Jiang Mengzhou, revolutionary.
- Xie Nanling, revolutionary.
- Jiang Yaxun, revolutionary.
- Chen Zhongyi, revolutionary.

== Gallery ==
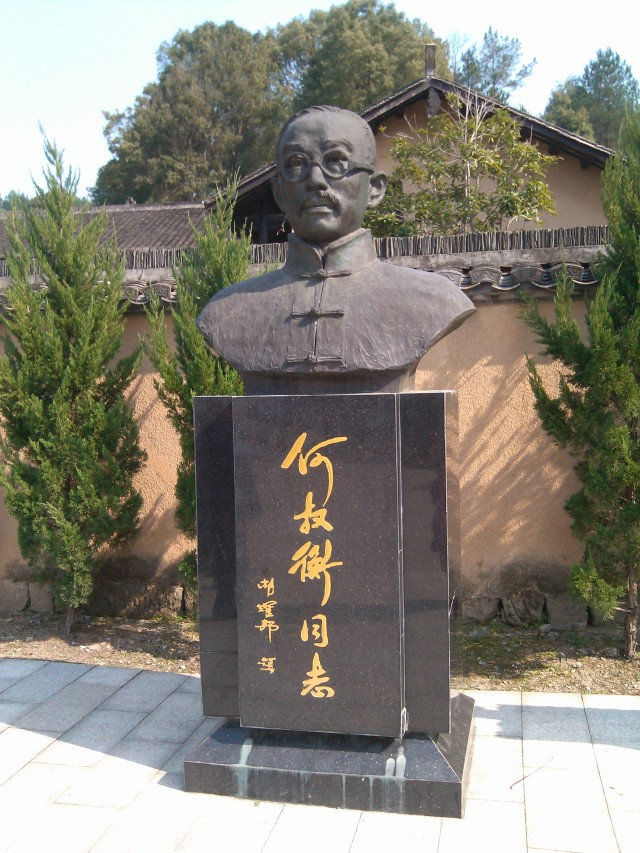
The statue of He Shuheng in the Former Residence of He Shuheng.

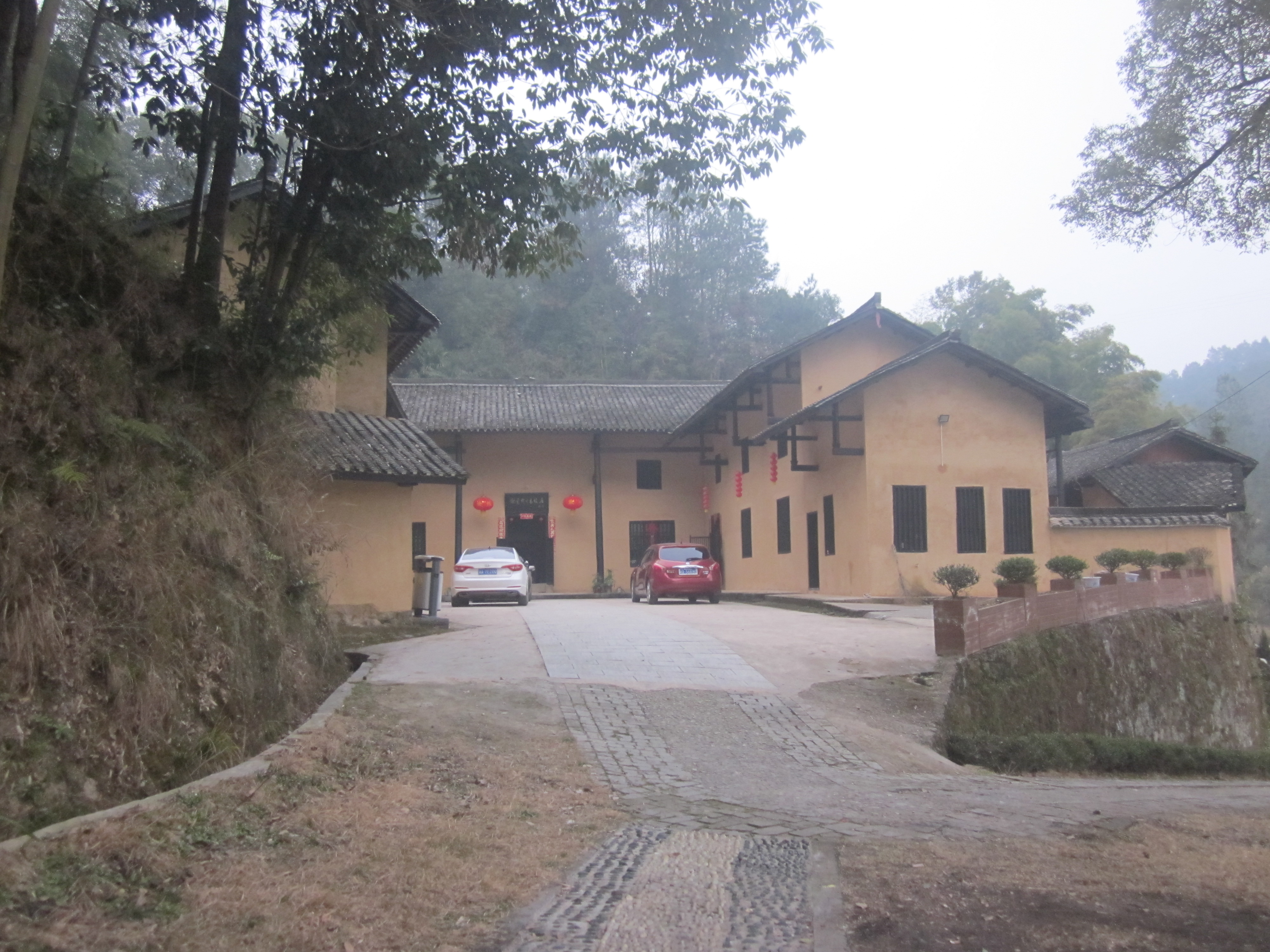
The Former Residence of Xie Juezai.

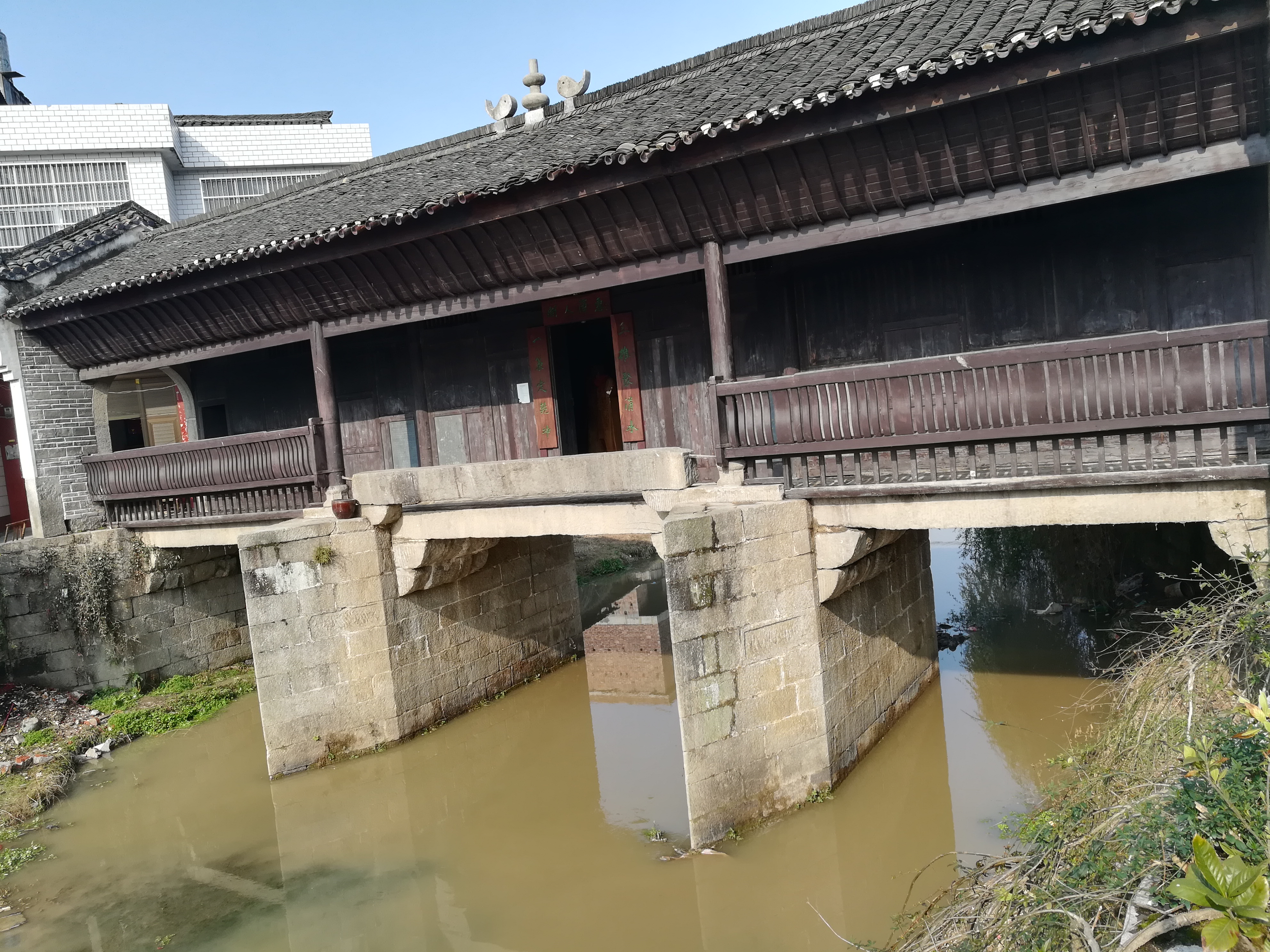
The Huitong Covered Bridge.
