= Former Residence of Xie Juezai =

Former Residence of Xie juezai
- 谢觉哉故居
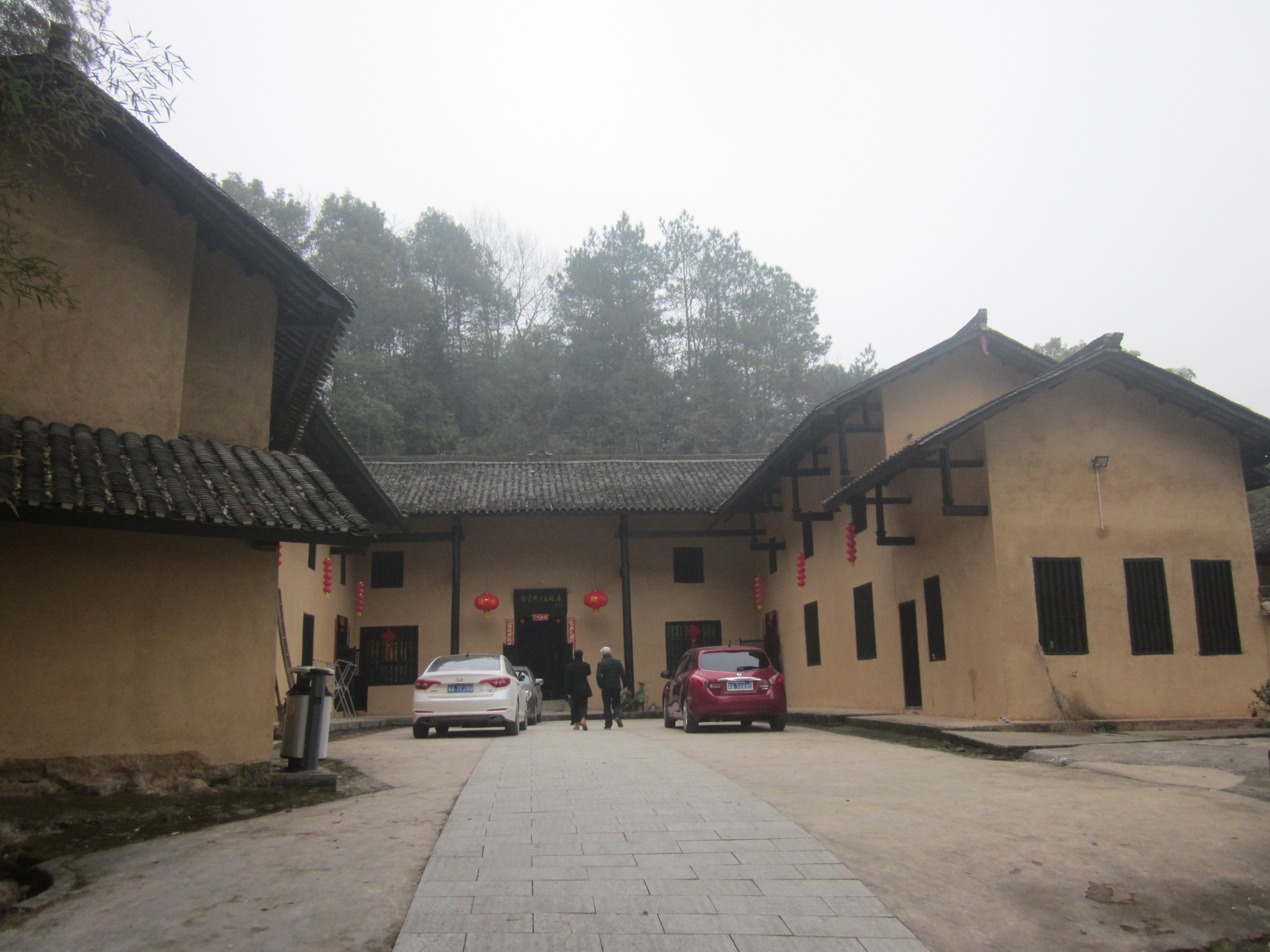
- Former Residence of Xie Juezai.

- Location within Hunan

General information
- Type: Traditional folk houses
- Location: Shatian Township, Ningxiang County, Hunan, China
- Coordinates: 28°04′58″N 112°03′32″E
- Completed: 1821
- Opened: 2004

Technical details
- Floor area: 740 m^{2} (8,000 sq ft)

The Former Residence of Xie juezai or Xie Juezai's Former Residence (simplified Chinese: 谢觉哉故居; traditional Chinese: 謝覺哉故居; pinyin: Xiè Juézaī Gùjū) was the birthplace and childhood home of Xie Juezai, a Chinese politician who served as the President of the Supreme People's Court from 1959 to 1965. The residence is located in Shatian Township, Ningxiang County, Hunan, approximately 70-kilometre (43 mi) from the county seat. It covers an area of 2,100 m^{2} (23,000 sq ft) and a building area of 740 m^{2} (8,000 sq ft), comprises buildings such as main room, living room, kitchen, and bedroom.

== History ==
The residence was built by Xie Juezai's ancestors in the 1st Year of Daoguang Emperor (1821–1850) in the Qing dynasty (1644–1911), namely 1821.

On April 26, 1883, in the ruling of Guangxu Emperor (1875–1908), Xie Juezai was born in here.

In 1997 it was listed as a Municipality-level Patriotic Education Base by the Propaganda Department of the Changsha Municipal Government.

In August 2000 it was classified as a Municipality Protected Historic Site.

On May 19, 2002, it was designated as a provincial level key cultural heritage.

In April 2004, during the 100th anniversary of the birth of Xie Juezai, the Government of Ningxiang renovated the residence and then it was officially opened to the public.

In 2013 it was listed as a "Historical and Cultural Sites Protected at the Provincial Level".

== Access ==
The Former Residence of Xie Juezai open to visitors for free.

== Surrounding area ==
Nearby attractions include the Former Residence of He Shuheng.

== Gallery ==
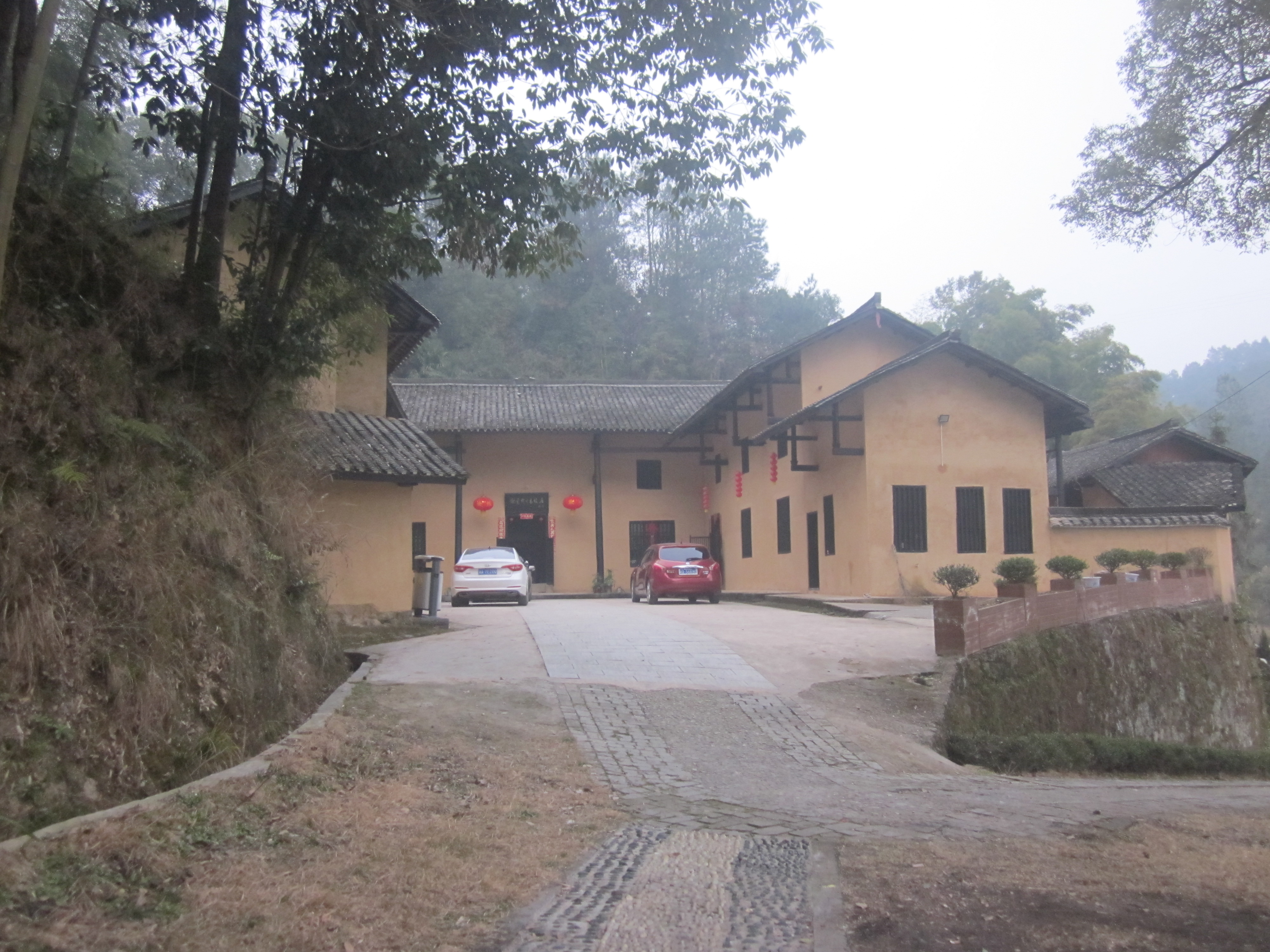
The Former Residence.

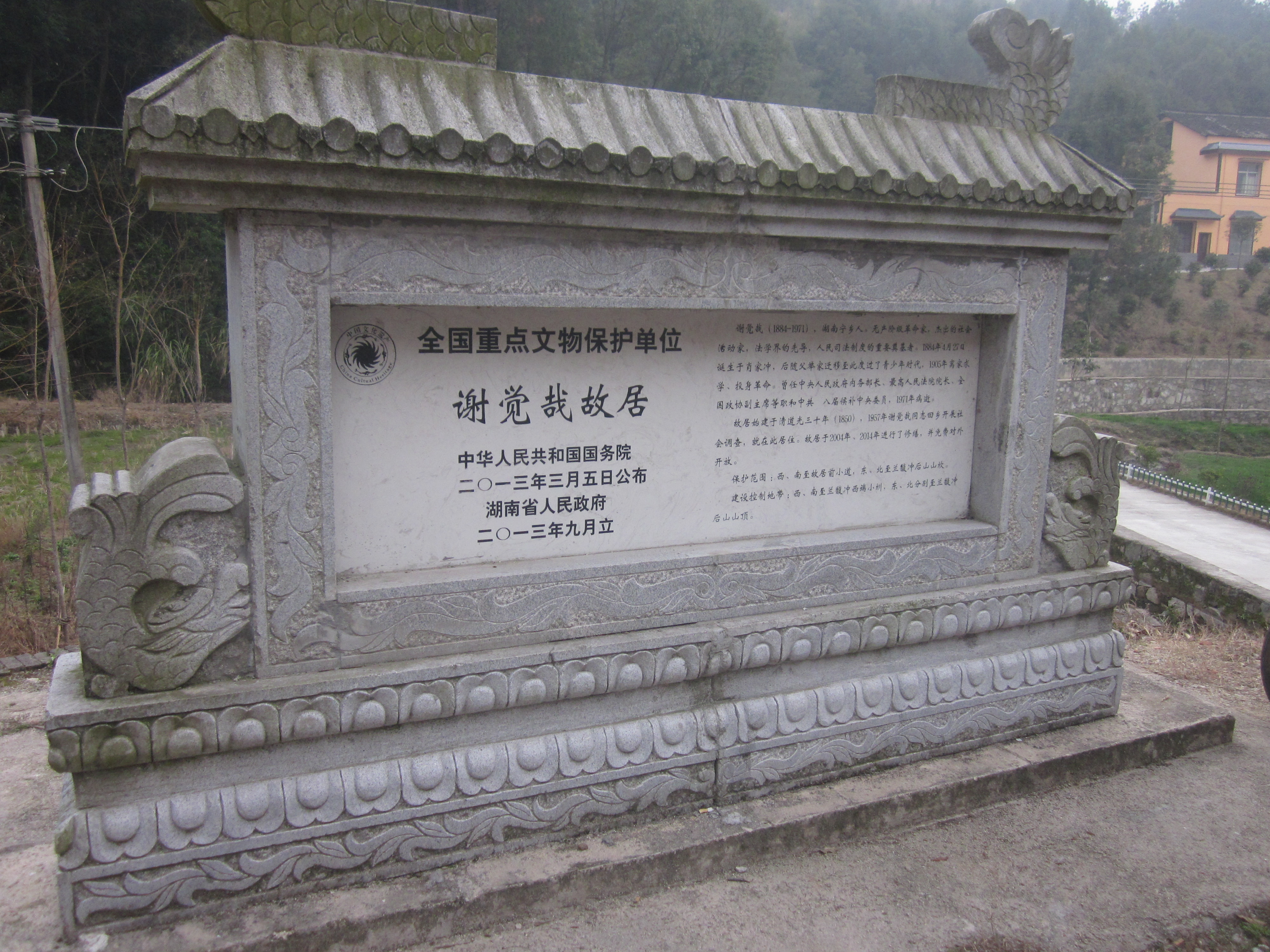
The Stele.

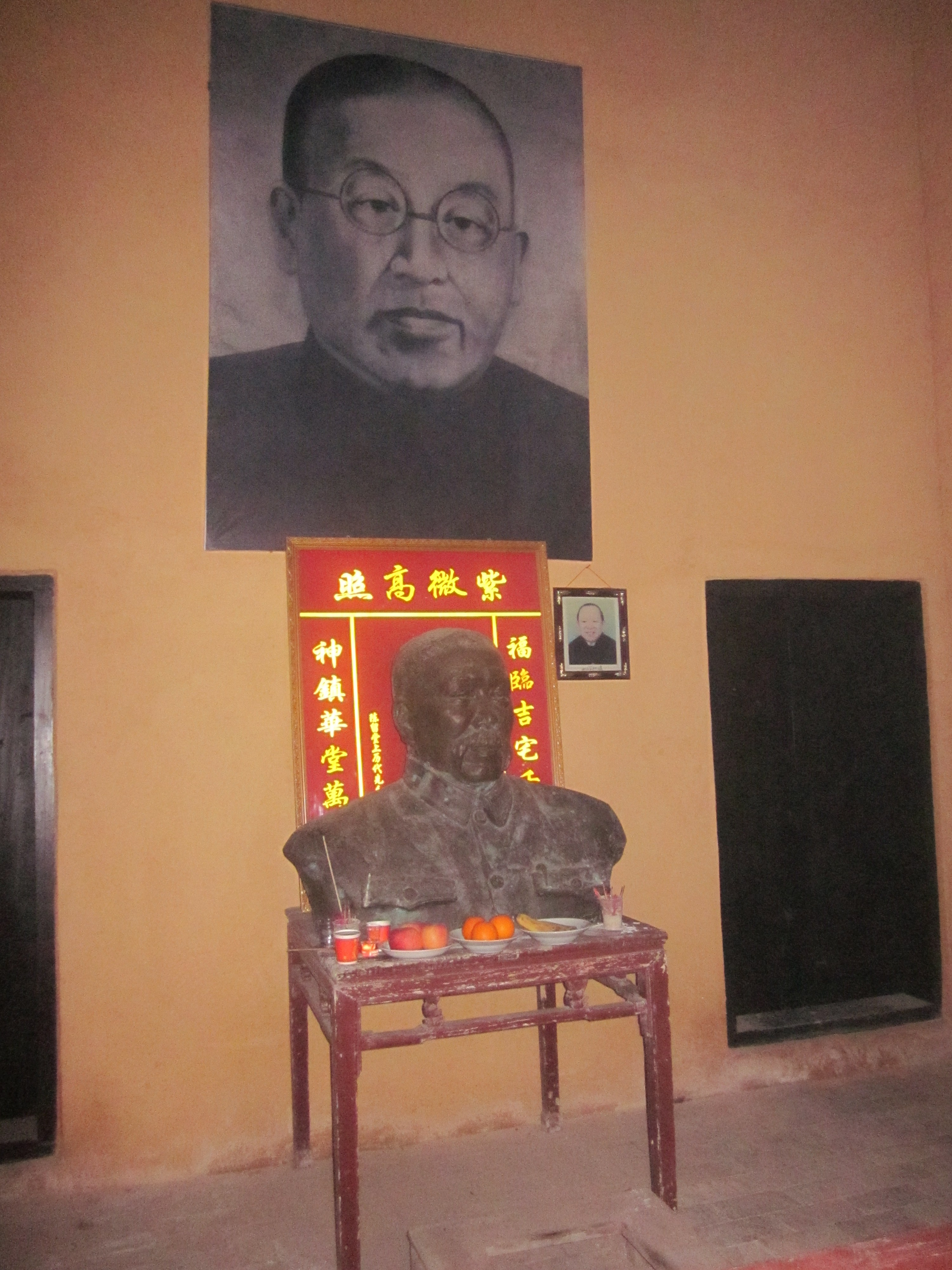
Bronze Statue of Xie Juezai at the table in the main room.
