= Government Administration Council =

Defunct government body in China

Government Administration Council of the Central People's Government
- 中央人民政府政務院
- National Emblem of China

Agency overview
- Formed: 1 October 1949; 77 years ago
- Preceding agency: Executive Yuan
- Dissolved: 27 September 1954; 72 years ago
- Superseding agency: State Council of the People's Republic of China
- Type: Highest executive body of the Central People's Government
- Jurisdiction: Mainland China
- Headquarters: West Flower Hall, Zhongnanhai, Beijing
- Agency executives: Zhou Enlai, Premier; Dong Biwu, Chen Yun, Guo Moruo, Huang Yanpei, Deng Xiaoping, Vice Premiers
- Child agency: General Office

Government Administration Council
- Traditional Chinese: 中央人民政府政務院
- Simplified Chinese: 中央人民政府政务院
Transcriptions
Standard Mandarin
- Hanyu Pinyin: Zhōngyāng Rénmín Zhèngfǔ Zhèngwùyuàn

The Government Administration Council of the Central People's Government was the "highest executive body of state affairs" under the leadership of the Central People's Government Council of the People's Republic of China from October 1, 1949, to September 15, 1954, and was an agency of the Central People's Government.

The Government Administration Council was replaced by the State Council in 1954. The size and powers of the Government Administration Council were much smaller than that of the State Council. The Government Administration Council was not the highest administrative organ of the state, but the highest executive organ of state affairs. The State Planning Commission of the Central People's Government is also established in conjunction with the Government Administration Council.

== Membership ==
Premier, Vice Premier, State Councillor and Secretary General of the Government Administration Council (1949–1954)

=== Premier ===
- Zhou Enlai (appointed at the first meeting of the Central People's Government Committee on October 1, 1949)

=== Vice Premier ===
- Initial appointment of vice premiers: Dong Biwu, Chen Yun, Guo Moruo, Huang Yanpei (appointed by the third meeting of the Central People's Government Committee on October 19, 1949);
- Later appointed Vice Premier: Deng Xiaoping (appointed by the 17th meeting of the Central People's Government Council on August 7, 1952).

=== Councillor ===
- A total of 15 members of the Political Affairs Commission were initially appointed: Tan Pingshan, Xie Juezai, Luo Ruiqing, Bo Yibo, Zeng Shan, Teng Daiyuan, Zhang Bojun, Li Lisan, Ma Xulun, Chen Shaoxian, Wang Kunlun, Luo Longji, Zhang Naiqi, Shao Lizi, and Huang Shaohong (appointed at the third meeting of the Central People's Government Committee on October 19, 1949);
- Later appointed as the Political Affairs Commissioner: Li Fuchun (appointed at the 6th meeting of the Central People's Government Council on April 11, 1950).

=== Secretary General ===
1. Li Weihan (appointed by the 3rd meeting of the Central People's Government Committee on October 19, 1949);
2. Xi Zhongxun (appointed by the 28th meeting of the Central People's Government Committee on September 18, 1953, and Li Weihan was removed from the post of Secretary-General at the same time).

==== Deputy Secretary-General ====
- Qi Yanming
- Xu Guangping (female)
- Guo Chuntao (died of illness in August 1950)
- Sun Qimeng
- Xin Zhichao
- Qu Wu (appointed in September 1951)
- Tao Xijin (appointed in September 1951)
- Zhang Weiyi (appointed in September 1951)
- Liao Luyan (appointed in August 1953)
- Sun Zhiyuan (appointed in November 1953)

== Organization ==
=== Component Department ===
(According to Articles 18 and 22 of the Organic Law of the Central People's Government of the People's Republic of China)

- Government Administration Council of the Central People's Government
  - Ministry of Foreign Affairs of the Central People's Government
  - Central People's Government Intelligence Bureau (abolished in August 1952)
  - Overseas Chinese Affairs Commission of the Central People's Government
  - Ministry of Personnel of the Central People's Government (established in September 1950)
  - North China Affairs Department of the Central People's Government (established in September 1950 and abolished in April 1952)
  - North China Administrative Committee of the Government Administration Council (established in April 1952, changed to North China Administrative Committee of the Central People's Government in November 1952)
  - Central Meteorological Bureau (established in August 1953)
  - Political and Legal Committee of the Government Administration Council
  1. Ministry of Internal Affairs of the Central People's Government
  2. Ministry of Public Security of the Central People's Government
  3. Ministry of Justice of the Central People's Government
  4. Central People's Government Legislative Affairs Commission
  5. Central People's Government Nationalities Affairs Commission
  - Financial and Economic Committee of the Government Administration Council (After the establishment of the State Planning Commission of the Central People's Government in November 1952, the Ministry of Heavy Industry, the First Ministry of Machine Building and other eight ministries were placed under the leadership of the State Planning Commission.)
  1. Ministry of Finance of the Central People's Government
  2. Ministry of Commerce of the Central People's Government (abolished in September 1952)
  3. Ministry of Heavy Industry of the Central People's Government
  4. Ministry of Fuel Industry of the Central People's Government
  5. Ministry of Textile Industry of the Central People's Government
  6. Ministry of Food Industry of the Central People's Government (abolished in December 1950)
  7. Ministry of Light Industry of the Central People's Government
  8. Ministry of Railways of the Central People's Government
  9. Ministry of Posts and Telecommunications of the Central People's Government
  10. Ministry of Transport of the Central People's Government
  11. Ministry of Agriculture of the Central People's Government
  12. Ministry of Forestry and Reclamation of the Central People's Government
  13. Ministry of Water Resources of the Central People's Government
  14. Ministry of Labor of the Central People's Government
  15. People's Bank of China
  16. General Administration of Customs of the Central People's Government (abolished in January 1953)
  17. Ministry of Foreign Trade of the Central People's Government (established in August 1952)
  18. Ministry of Commerce of the Central People's Government (established in August 1952)
  19. Ministry of Food of the Central People's Government (established in August 1952)
  20. The First Ministry of Machine Building Industry of the Central People's Government (established in August 1952)
  21. Second Ministry of Machine Building Industry of the Central People's Government (established in August 1952)
  22. Ministry of Construction Engineering of the Central People's Government (established in August 1952)
  23. Ministry of Geology of the Central People's Government (established in November 1952)
  - Culture and Education Committee of the Government Administration Council
  1. Ministry of Culture of the Central People's Government
  2. Ministry of Education of the Central People's Government
  3. Ministry of Health of the Central People's Government
  4. Chinese Academy of Sciences
  5. Central People's Government Press Administration (abolished in August 1952)
  6. Central People's Government Press and Publication Administration
  7. Ministry of Higher Education of the Central People's Government (established in November 1952)
  8. Central People's Government Sports Committee (established in November 1952)
  9. Central People's Government Illiteracy Eradicating Working Committee (established in November 1952)
  - People's Supervisory Committee of the Government Administration Council

=== Government Administration Council ===
(According to Article 20 of the Organic Law of the Central People's Government of the People's Republic of China and other documents)

- Secretary's Office of the Government Administration Council
- Government Administration Council Counselor's Office
- Administration Bureau of Government Affairs
- Personnel Bureau of the Government Administration Council (merged into the Ministry of Personnel of the Central People's Government in September 1950)
- Expert Working Group of the Government Administration Council (established in August 1953)
  - Expert Work Office of the Government Administration Council (established in August 1953)
  - Administration of Experts Reception Affairs of the Government Administration Council (established in August 1953)

=== Other agencies of the Government Administration Council ===
- The Government Administration Council and its affiliated units' organization establishment review committee
- National Compilation Committee (established in March 1950)
- Central Patriotic Health Campaign Committee (established on March 14, 1952)
- Central Committee for the Implementation of the Marriage Law Movement (established on January 9, 1953)
- Central Demobilization Committee (jointly led by the Government Administration Council and the People's Revolutionary Military Commission of the Central People's Government. The department was established on July 4, 1950, and changed to the Central Demobilization Construction Committee on December 7, 1951)
- Central Commission for Resettlement and Construction (established on December 7, 1951)
- Labor and Employment Committee of the Government Administration Council (established on July 25, 1952, abolished on September 27, 1954)
- Production and Processing Committee of the Central People's Government (established on February 29, 1952, abolished on September 27, 1954)

== Decrees ==
- In May 1951, the Government Administration Council issued the "Instructions on Dealing with Titles, Place Names, Stele Tablets, and Plaques That Discriminate against or Insult Minority Nationalities."
- In December 1951, the Government Administration Council issued the "Instructions on Changing Place Names."
