= Baiyun Temple (Ningxiang) =

Buddhist temple in Hunan, China

- 白云寺
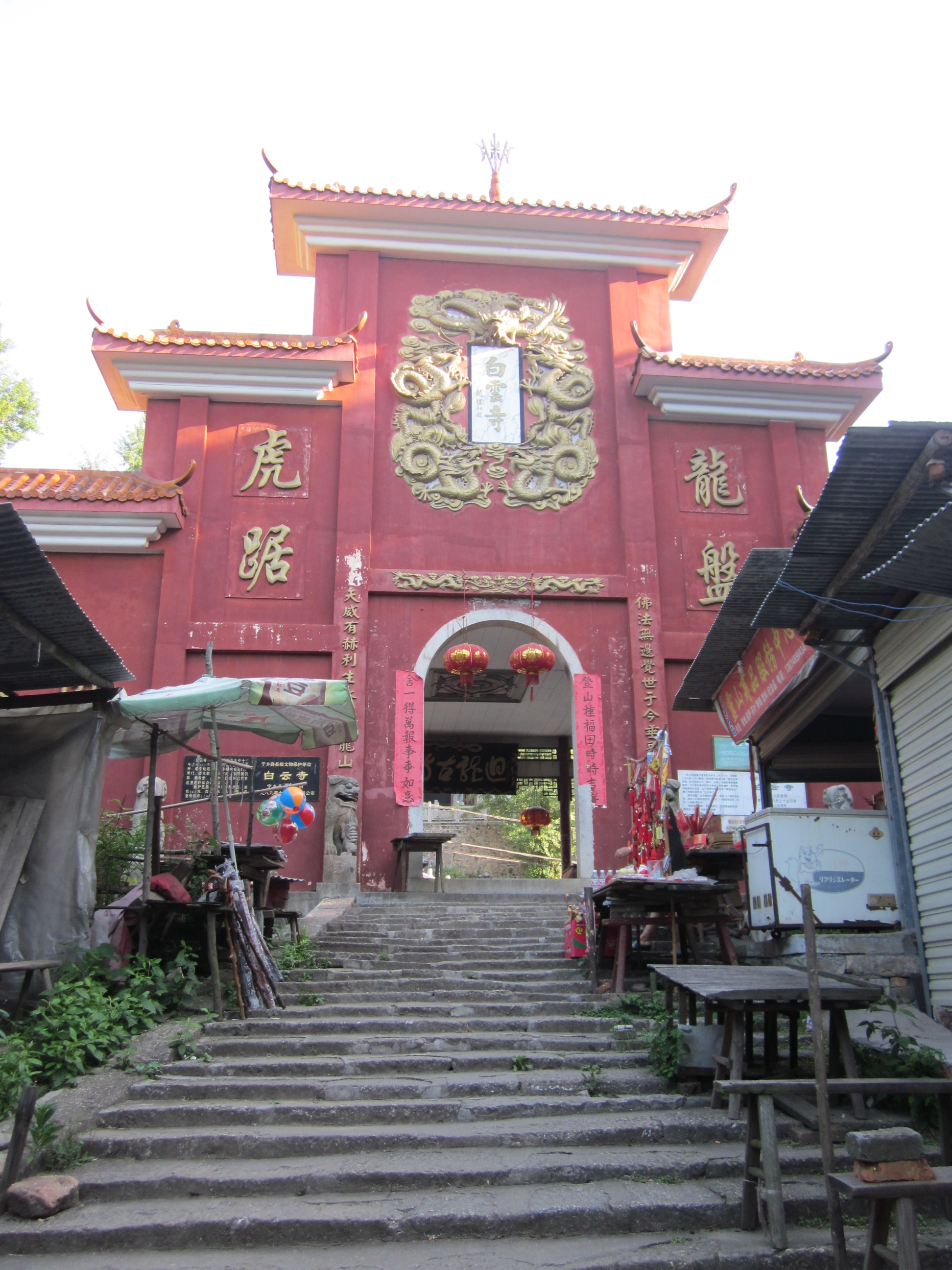
- The torii gate.

- Location within Hunan Location within China

Religion
- Affiliation: Buddhism
- Sect: Chan

Location
- Location: Shuangfupu Town, Ningxiang, Hunan
- Country: China
- Coordinates: 28°06′33″N 112°20′14″E

Architecture
- Founder: Guang'en
- Completed: AD 858

Baiyun Temple (simplified Chinese: 白云寺; traditional Chinese: 白雲寺; pinyin: Báiyún Sì), built in the twelfth year (858) of the age of Dazhong (847–860) of Tang Xuanzong (810–859) in the Tang dynasty (618–907). It is listed on the culture relic preservations of Changsha, where Mao Zedong did social research in 1917. With a superbly vast outlook, it serves as an important site for Buddhist activities. It includes the Entrance, Torii, Deities Hall, Hall of the Great Heroes, Assisted dnyana, Dining Room, etc.

== Name ==
The name of the Baiyun Temple derives from the view of temple shrouded by white clouds.

== History ==
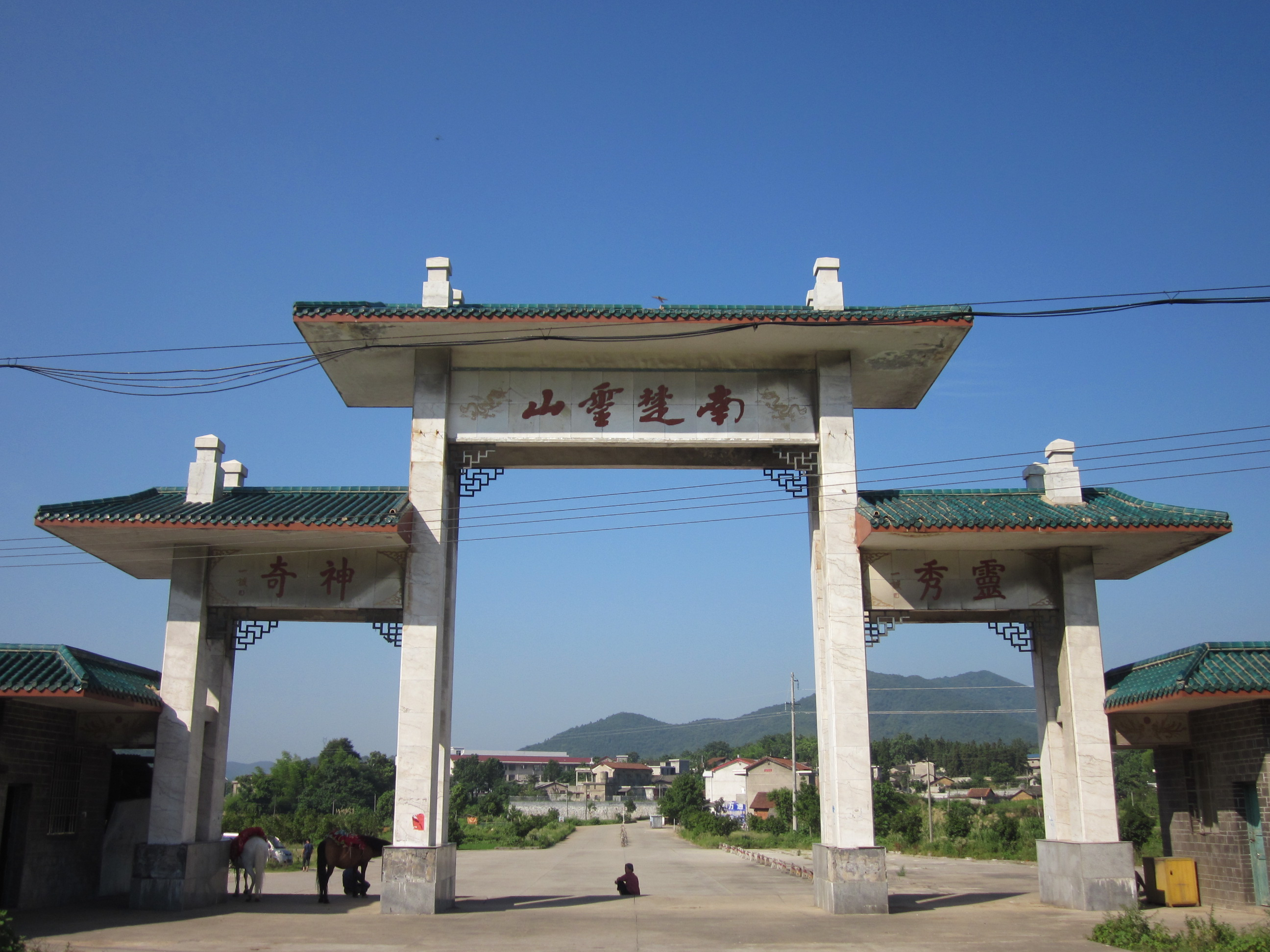
Entrance. The architrave is engraved with the Chinese characters "南楚靈山" (南楚靈山 means the spiritual mountain in south Hunan) written by Qing dynasty Chinese statesman and military leader Zuo Zongtang (1812–1885). Chinese characters "靈秀" (靈秀 means delicately beautiful) and "神奇" (神奇 means miraculous) written by former Venerable Master of the Buddhist Association of China Yicheng (1927–2017) are engraved on both sides.

=== Tang dynasty (618–907) ===
In 858, in the twelfth year (858) of the age of Dazhong (847–860) of Tang Xuanzong (810–859) in the Tang dynasty (618–907), master Guang'en (光恩禅师) built Qinglin Temple (清林寺) in Su Rever, in Huilong Mountain (回龙山粟溪).

=== Ming dynasty (1638–1644) ===
Wang Bi (王陛) and his son Wang Weihan (王维汉) extended Baiyun Temple.

=== Qing dynasty (1644–1911) ===
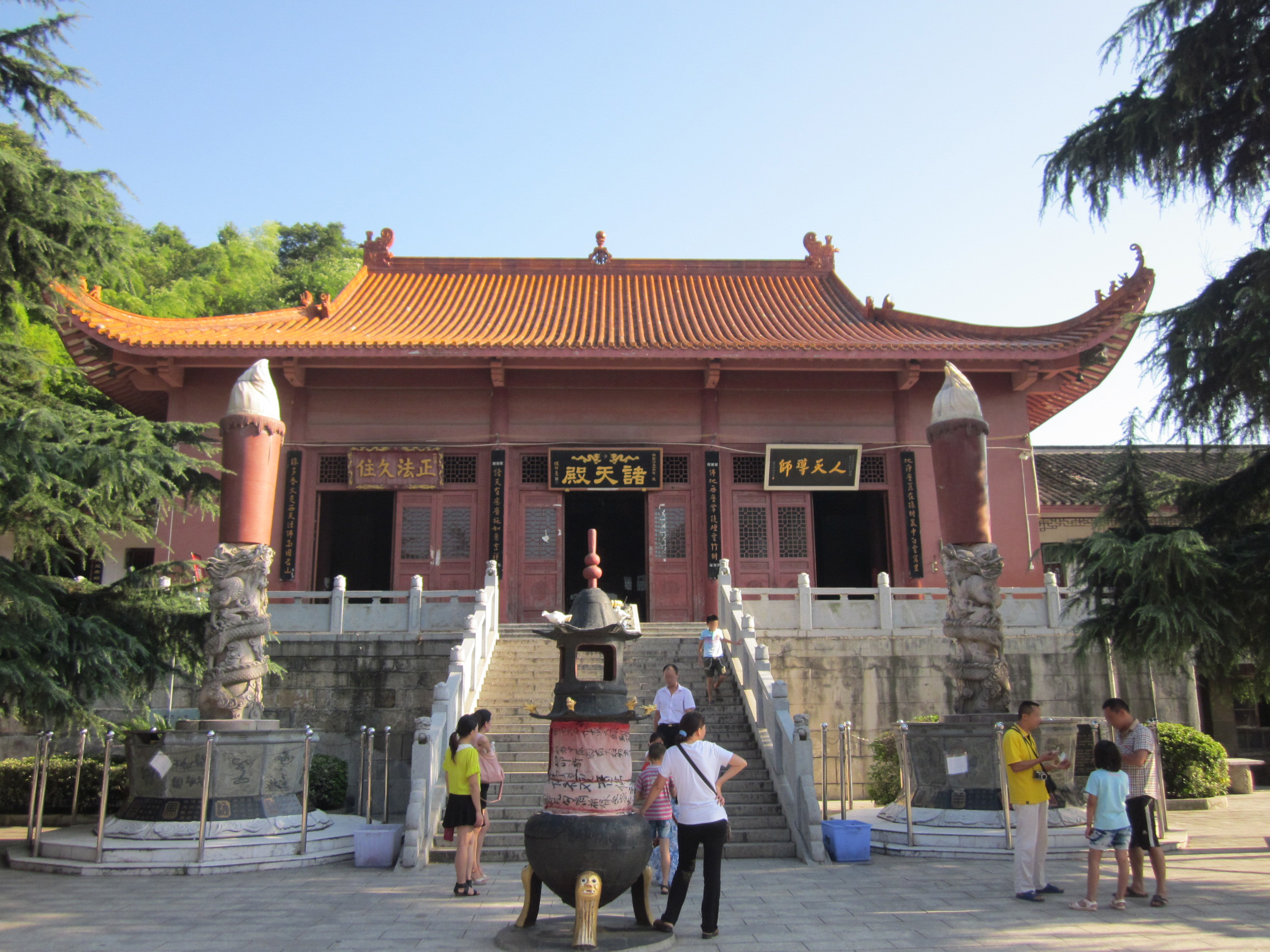
Hall of the Great Heroes

In 1646, in the third year of the age of Shunzhi of Shunzhi Emperor (1638–1661), Tao Runai (陶汝鼐; 1601–1683) rebuilt Baiyun Temple.

In the period of the Qianlong Emperor (1736–1796), Wanxing (万行) rebuilt Baiyun Temple. In 1763, in the twenty-eighth year of the age of the Qianlong Emperor, Qinglin Temple and Baiyun Temple were consolidated and renamed "Baiyun Temple".

In the period of the Daoguang Emperor (1821–1850), the monks rebuilt Baiyun Temple.

=== People's Republic of China ===
In 1988, the People's Government of Ningxiang rebuilt Baiyun Temple. In 1989, the Ningxiang Buddhist Association was set up in Baiyun Temple.
