= Ningxiang No. 13 High School =

- 宁乡十三中
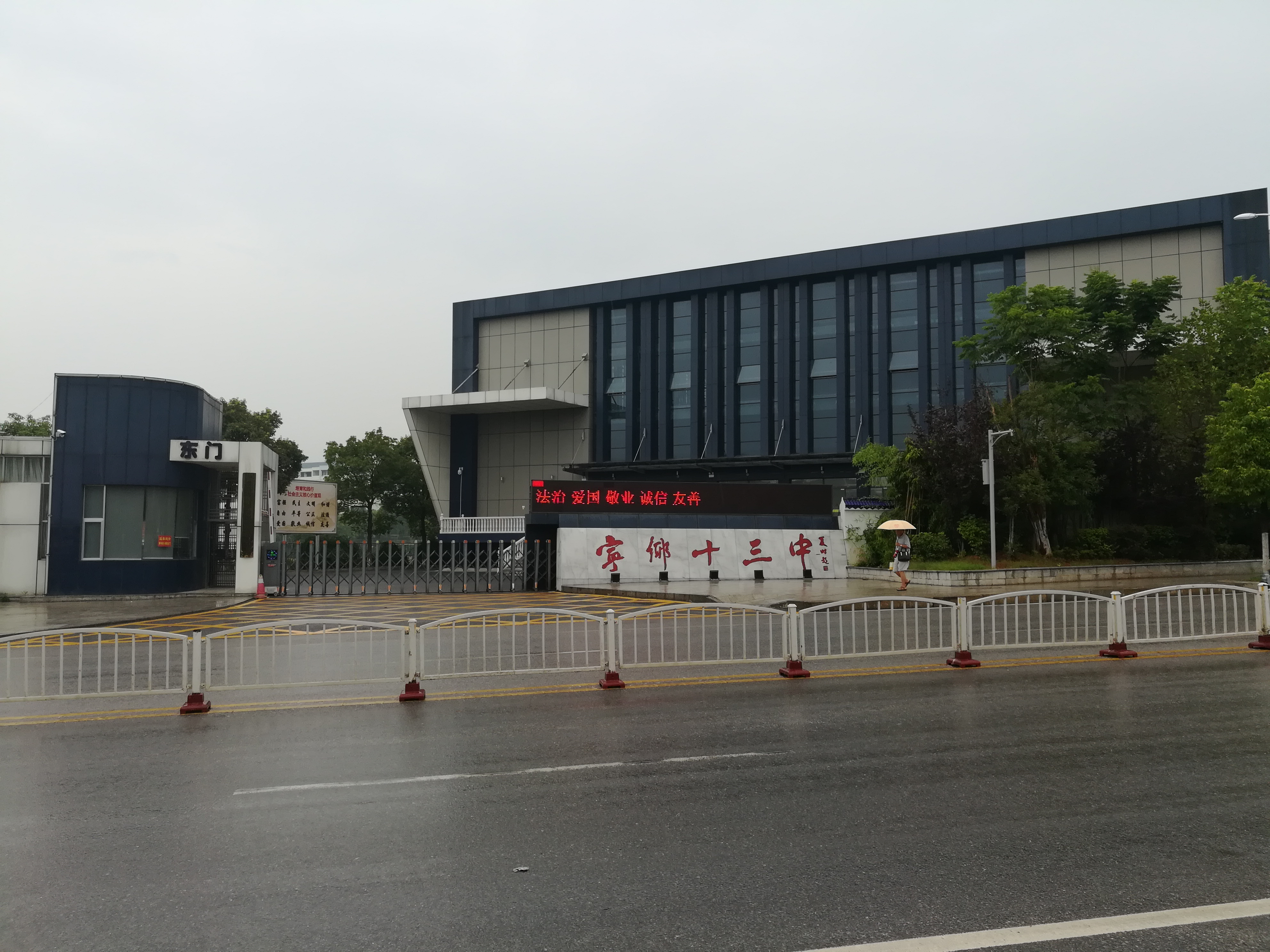
- Eastern Gate of the No. 13 High School

Location
- West Chuwei Road, Ningxiang, Hunan, China; 410635
- Coordinates: 28°16′09″N 112°32′33″E

Information
- Type: Comprehensive Public High School
- Established: 1954
- Founders: He Xuntao (贺薰陶)
- Principal: Qiu Tianmin (邱田民)
- Grades: 10 to 12
- Gender: Coed
- Campus size: 104,000 square metres (1,120,000 sq ft)
- Campus type: Urban
- Affiliation: Ningxiang Municipal Bureau of Education
- Website: www.nxssz.com

Ningxiang No. 13 High School (simplified Chinese: 宁乡市第十三高级中学; traditional Chinese: 寧鄉市第十三高級中學), commonly abbreviated as Ningxiang Shisanzhong (simplified Chinese: 宁乡十三中; traditional Chinese: 寧鄉十三中; pinyin: Níngxiāng Shīsānzhōng), is a public high school in downtown Ningxiang, Hunan, China. The school is one of the model high schools in Ningxiang and has a great reputation for its excellent education quality, especially in literature and art.

== History ==
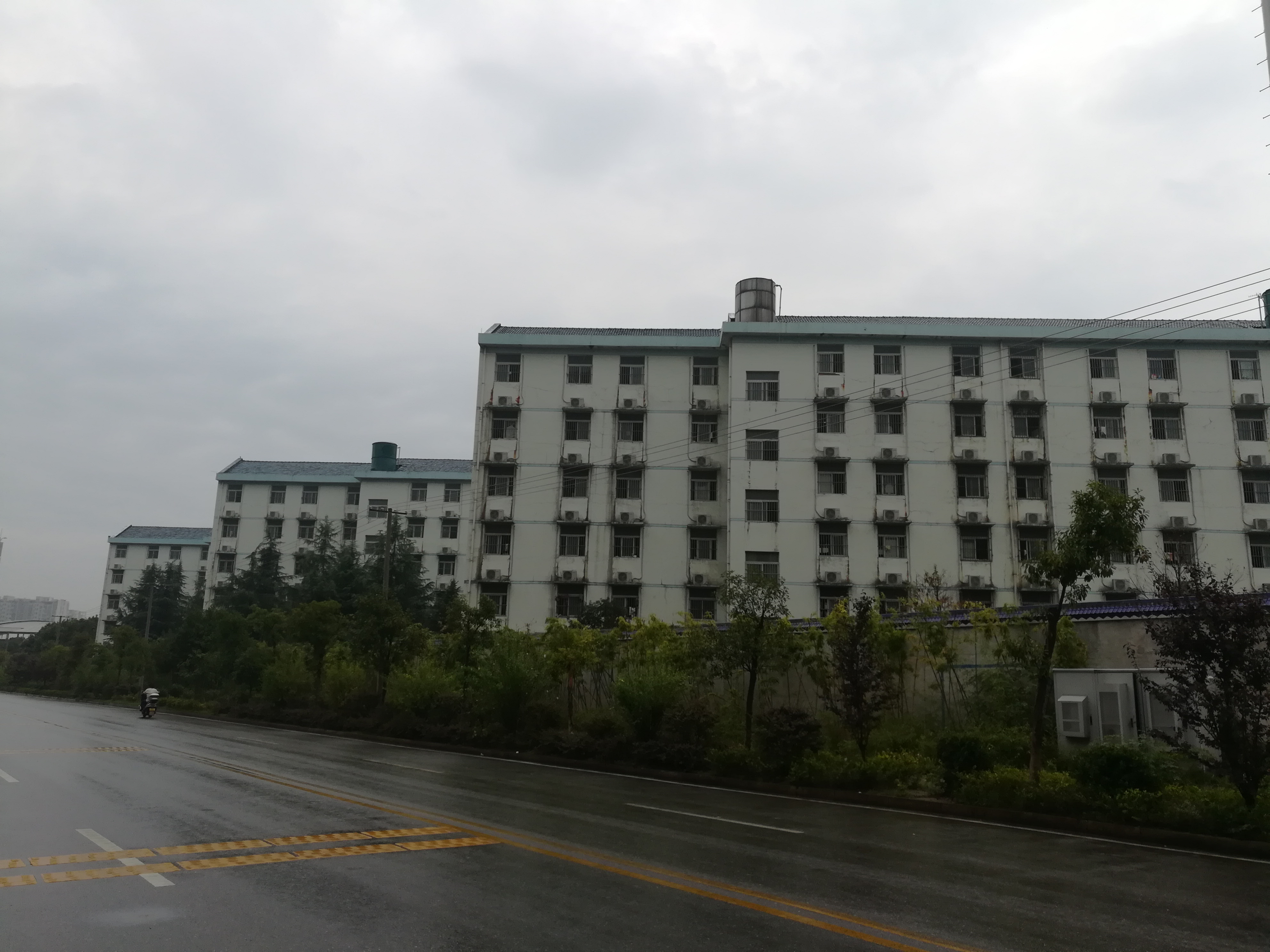
Dormitories

The Ningxiang No. 13 High School traces its roots back to the former Keda Primary School of the Ou Family (欧氏可大完全小学), founded by He Xuntao (贺薰陶) in 1949. In 1954, the school moved to Sanyangtang, Bitang Brigade, Heshiqiao Commune (贺石桥公社碧塘大队三阳塘). It was renamed as Meitanba Primary School (煤炭坝完全小学) after that and opened its doors in July 1955 to eight classes of more than 300 students.

After the closure of Meitanba Primary School in 1958, it became a middle school with the addition of the 7th, 8th and 9th grades. In July 1976, Heshiqiao Middle School (贺石桥中学) was merged into Ningxiang No. 13 High School. The school was renamed as Ningxiang No. 13 High School in 1977. In August 1978, the school was separated from Heshiqiao Middle School.

In March 2007, it was listed among the "Model High Schools in Hunan" (湖南省示范性高级中学).

== Education Features ==
- Singing. In June 2016, Xia Yu won the championship in the National Campus Auditions in Sichuan of The Voice of China.

== Principals ==
Ningxiang No. 13 High School's Heads of School have been Peng Shaokang (彭邵康; 1955-1958), Chen Juxun (陈巨勋; 1958-1963), Tan Jihui (谭吉晖; 1963-1970), Li Kaiyin (李凯寅; 1970-1976), Jiang Zhirong (蒋芝荣; 1976-1984), Ding Shenqian (丁申乾; 1984-1988), Peng Jianming (彭建明; 1988-1993), Yi Guangrong (易光荣; 1993-1995), Yan Qiuliang (严秋良; 1995-1998), Xiao Mingzhong (肖命中; 1998-2001), Zhou Zhiwen (周志文; 2001-2002), Lai Weixin (赖维新; 2002-2004), Yu Gujin (余谷进; 2004-2015), and Qiu Tianmin (邱田民; 2015–present).

== Notable alumni ==
- Cai Cheng (蔡成), writer.
- Chen Huaming (陈华明), professor at Sichuan University.
- He Xiaoping (贺小平), writer.
- Xia Shi (夏时), calligrapher.
- Xia Tingfang (聂廷芳), professor at Hunan University.
- Xie Youping (谢佑平), professor at Fudan University.
- Yang Ziyun (杨梓云), officer in the PLA Air Force.
- Zhou Siyang (周思扬), officer in the National Energy Administration.
