= Shangliu Temple (Ningxiang) =

Buddhist temple in Hunan, China

- 上流寺
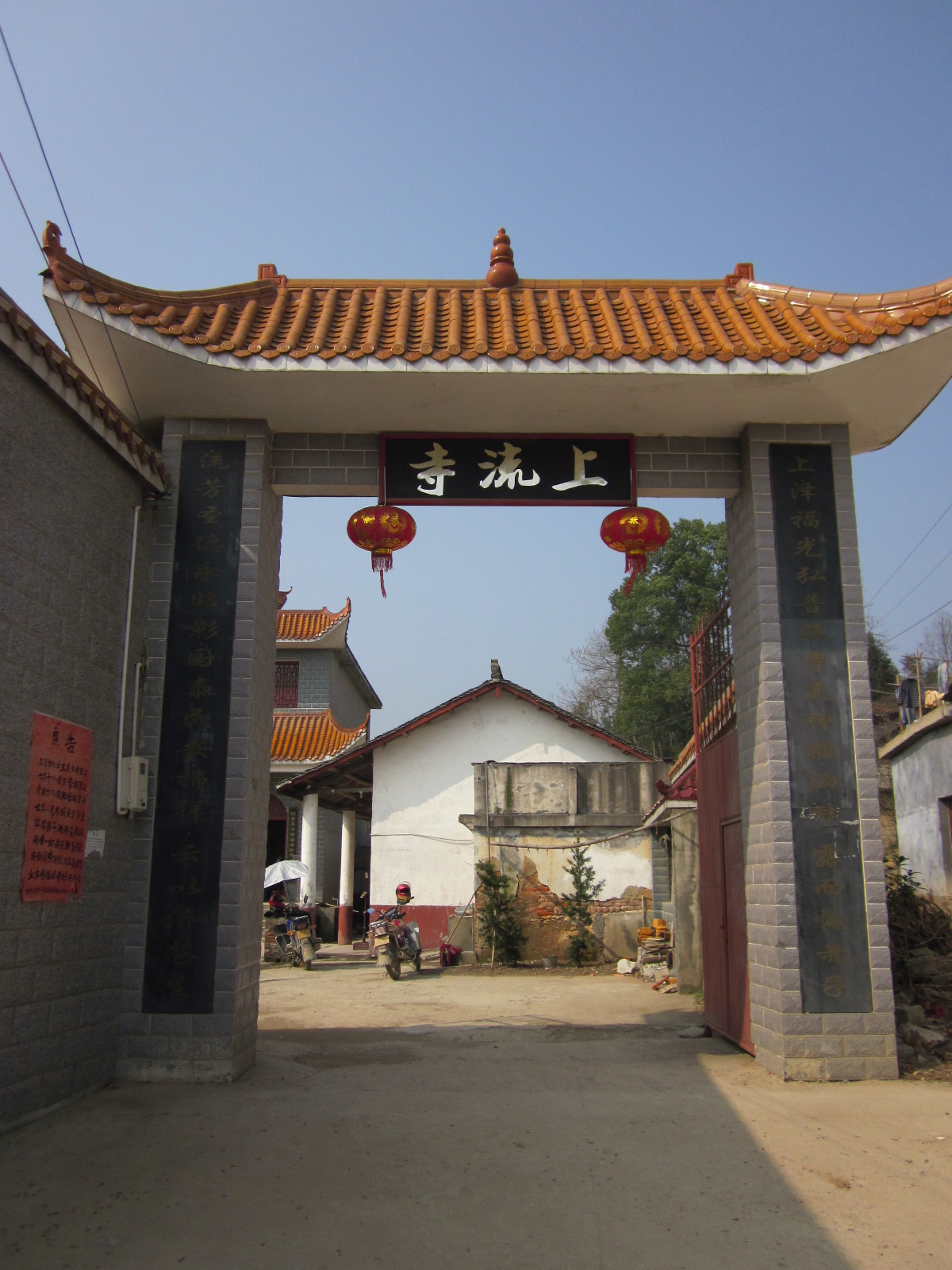
- Entrance.

- Location within Hunan

Religion
- Affiliation: Buddhism
- Sect: Chan Buddhism
- Deity: Gautama Buddha; Guanyin; Buddha Qing'an; Jade Emperor; etc.

Location
- Location: Qingshanqiao Town, Ningxiang, Hunan
- Country: China
- Interactive map of Shangliu Temple
- Coordinates: 27°56′27″N 112°02′52″E

Architecture
- Style: Chinese architecture
- Established: Qing dynasty (1644–1911)

The Shangliu Temple (Chinese: 上流寺; pinyin: shàngliú Sì) is a Buddhist temple located in Qingshanqiao Town of Ningxiang City, Hunan Province, People's Republic of China. It includes the Shanmen, Mahavira Hall, Meditation Hall, Dining Room, Guanyin Pavilion, etc.

== History ==
Shangliu Temple was built in Qing dynasty (1644–1911).

During the New Culture Movement (1910 and 1920s), it was occupied. The last abbot Keyi (瞌揖) fled to the Fozu Mountain (佛祖山) and went into seclusion. It was used as a sewing school. Later, it was used as the schoolhouse of Ningxiang Primary School.

In 1939, it was used as the Government Office of Shangliu Township (上流乡政府).

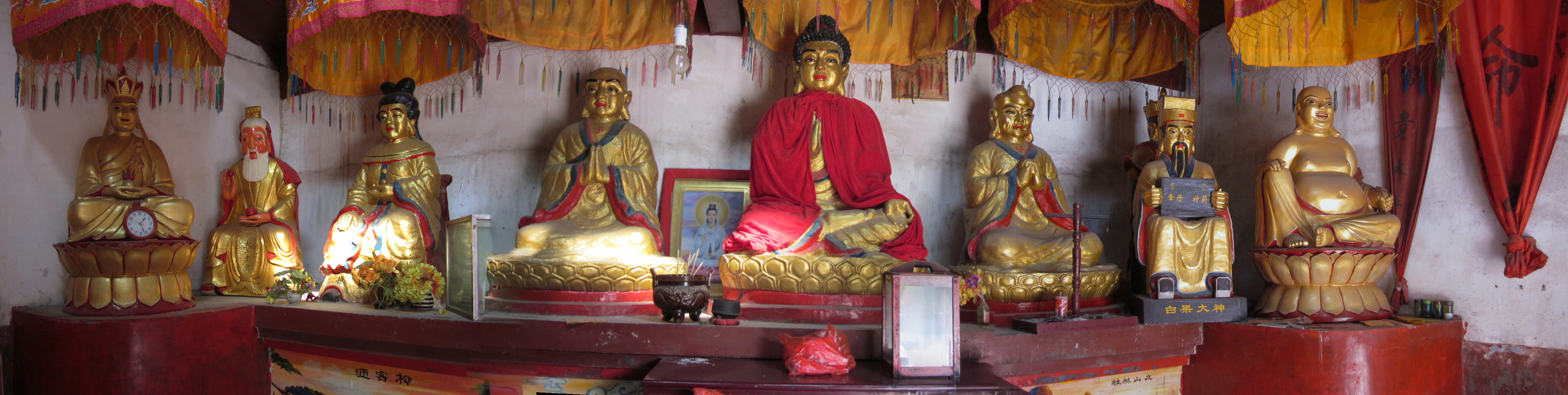
The Main Hall
