= Central People's Government Council =

Defunct government body in China

- 中央人民政府委員會; Zhōngyāng Rénmín Zhèngfǔ Wěiyuánhuì
- National Emblem of China

Agency overview
- Formed: 1 October 1949; 77 years ago
- Dissolved: 27 September 1954; 72 years ago
- Type: Highest authority of the Central People's Government
- Headquarters: Zhongnanhai, Beijing
- Agency executives: Mao Zedong, Chairman; Zhu De, Liu Shaoqi, Soong Ching-ling, Zhang Lan, Li Jishen, Gao Gang, Vice Chairpersons
- Child agency: General Office

The Central People's Government Council was the highest authority of the Central People's Government of the People's Republic of China. It was established in October 1949 after the proclamation of the People's Republic of China by Mao Zedong.

The Chairman of the Central People's Government was responsible for presiding over the meetings of the Central People's Government Council and leading its work, while the Vice Chairman of the Central People's Government was responsible for assisting the chairman in performing his duties. The council also had a Secretary-General who was elected from within the council.

The Central People's Government Council represented the People 's Republic of China externally and controlled state power internally. It led the Central People's Government as the highest executive body of state affairs. The council was also responsible for formulating the organization of the People's Revolutionary Military Commission, the Supreme People's Court, and the Supreme People's Procuratorate of the Central People's Government, which served as the highest military command body, the highest judicial body, and the highest procuratorial body, respectively. The Central People's Government Council had a general office and, as needed, set up subsidiary working bodies.

The Central People's Government Council was abolished in September 1954 due to the adoption of the constitution of the People's Republic of China and the implementation of the people's congress system. It only lasted for one term. The Central People's Government Council included the Chairman of the Central People's Government, six Vice Chairmen, and 56 members of the Central People's Government, who were elected by the plenary session of the CPPCC.

== History ==
On 27 September 1949, the first plenary session of the Chinese People's Political Consultative Conference (CPPCC) passed the Organic Law of the Central People's Government. It also elected the Central People's Government Council on 30 September 1949. The government was then promulgated by Mao Zedong at the ceremony of proclamation of the People's Republic of China on 1 October 1949.

On 20 September 1954, with the enactment of the Constitution of the People's Republic of China by the 1st National People's Congress (NPC), the Central People's Government Council ceased to exist.

== Powers ==
The powers of the Council included making and interpreting law, deciding on administrative policies, correcting the decisions and orders of the Government Administration Council, ratifying foreign treaties, handling issues concerning war and peace, approving the state budget, granting amnesty and pardon, giving honorary awards, appointing and removing senior officials, and preparing and convening the National People's Congress. The Council effectively acted as China's collective head of state. As explained by Dong Biwu during his report to the drafting process to the first plenary session of the Chinese People's Political Consultative Conference, "The powers and functions of the Central People’s Government Council are often provided by other countries’ constitutions as those of the heads of state".

== Membership ==
Portrait	Information	Political party	Other positions held
Chairman of the Central People's Government
	Mao Zedong; Birthplace: Xiangtan, Hunan; December 26, 1893 - September 9, 1976	Chinese Communist Party	Chairman of the Chinese Communist Party; Chairman of the People's Revolutionary Military Commission of the Central People's Government; Chairman of the 1st National Committee of the Chinese People's Political Consultative Conference
Vice Chairman of the Central People's Government
	Zhu De; Birthplace: Yilong, Sichuan; December 1, 1886 – July 6, 1976	Chinese Communist Party	Vice Chairman of the People's Revolutionary Military Commission of the Central People's Government; Standing Committee Member of the 1st National Committee of the Chinese People's Political Consultative Conference
	Liu Shaoqi; Birthplace: Ningxiang, Hunan; November 24, 1898 – November 12, 1969	Chinese Communist Party	Vice Chairman of the People's Revolutionary Military Commission of the Central People's Government; Standing Committee Member of the 1st National Committee of the Chinese People's Political Consultative Conference
	Soong Ching-ling; Birthplace: Wenchang, Guangdong; January 27, 1893 – May 29, 1981	Revolutionary Committee of the Chinese Kuomintang	Honorary Chairwoman of the All-China Women's Federation; Chairwoman of the executive committee of the China People's Relief Association; Chairwoman of the executive committee of the China Welfare Institute; Chairwoman of the China National Committee for the Protection of Children; Director of the World Peace Council; Chairwoman of the Asia-Pacific Regional Peace Liaison Committee
	Zhang Lan; Birthplace: Nanchong, Sichuan; 1872 – February 9, 1955	China Democratic League	Member of the Standing Committee of the 1st National Committee of the Chinese People's Political Consultative Conference
	Li Jishen; Birthplace: Cangwu, Guangxi; 1885 – October 9, 1959	Revolutionary Committee of the Chinese Kuomintang China Zhi Gong Party	First Vice Chairman of the CPPCC National Committee
	Gao Gang; Birthplace: Hengshan, Shaanxi; October 25, 1905 – August 17, 1954 Committed suicide	Chinese Communist Party	Chairman of the State Planning Commission of the Central People's Government; Member of the People's Revolutionary Military Commission of the Central People's Government

=== Member of the Central People's Government ===
- Chen Yi, also a member of the People's Revolutionary Military Commission
- He Long, also a member of the People's Revolutionary Military Commission
- Li Lisan, concurrently member of the Executive Yuan
- Lin Boqu
- Ye Jianying, also a member of the People's Revolutionary Military Commission
- He Xiangning (female, Revolutionary Committee of the Chinese Kuomintang), also a member of the Supreme People's Procuratorate
- Lin Biao, also a member of the People's Revolutionary Military Commission and a member of the Standing Committee of the First National Committee of the Chinese People's Political Consultative Conference
- Peng Dehuai, Vice Chairman of the People's Revolutionary Military Commission
- Liu Bocheng, also a member of the People's Revolutionary Military Commission
- Wu Yuzhang
- Xu Xiangqian, also a member of the People's Revolutionary Military Commission
- Peng Zhen
- Bo Yibo, also a member of the Political Affairs Committee
- Nie Rongzhen, also a member of the People's Revolutionary Military Commission
- Zhou Enlai, concurrently Premier of the State Council, Vice Chairman of the People's Revolutionary Military Commission, and Vice Chairman of the First National Committee of the Chinese People's Political Consultative Conference
- Dong Biwu, Vice Premier of the State Council
- Saifuding
- Rao Shushi, also a member of the People's Revolutionary Military Commission
- Tan Kah Kee (non-partisan), member of the Standing Committee of the First National Committee of the Chinese People's Political Consultative Conference
- Luo Ronghuan, also Chief Prosecutor of the Supreme People's Procuratorate
- Deng Zihui, also a member of the People's Revolutionary Military Commission
- Ulanhu, member of the Standing Committee of the First National Committee of the Chinese People's Political Consultative Conference
- Xu Teli
- Cai Chang (female)
- Liu Geping
- Ma Yinchu (non-partisan)
- Chen Yun, Vice Premier of the State Council
- Kang Sheng
- Lin Feng
- Ma Xulun (Democratic Progressive Party), concurrently a member of the Political Affairs Committee, and a member of the Standing Committee of the First National Committee of the Chinese People's Political Consultative Conference
- Guo Moruo (non-partisan), Vice Premier of the State Council, Vice Chairman of the First National Committee of the Chinese People's Political Consultative Conference
- Zhang Yunyi, also a member of the People's Revolutionary Military Commission
- Deng Xiaoping, also a member of the People's Revolutionary Military Commission
- Gao Chongmin (Democratic League)
- Shen Junru (China Democratic League), concurrently President of the Supreme People's Court, Vice Chairman of the First National Committee of the Chinese People's Political Consultative Conference
- Shen Yanbing (non-partisan), member of the Standing Committee of the National Committee of the Chinese People's Political Consultative Conference
- Chen Shutong (non-partisan), Vice Chairman of the National Committee of the Chinese People's Political Consultative Conference
- Situ Meitang (China Zhi Gong Party)
- Li Xijiu (Revolutionary Committee of the Chinese Kuomintang; died on March 10, 1952), also a member of the Supreme People's Procuratorate
- Huang Yanpei (China Democratic National Construction Association), Vice Premier of the State Council, Standing Committee Member of the First National Committee of the Chinese People's Political Consultative Conference
- Cai Tingkai (Civil Promotion), also a member of the People's Revolutionary Military Commission
- Xi Zhongxun, also a member of the People's Revolutionary Military Commission
- Peng Zemin (Farmers and Workers Democratic Party)
- Zhang Zhizhong (Revolutionary Committee of the Chinese Kuomintang), also a member of the People's Revolutionary Military Commission
- Fu Zuoyi (non-partisan), also a member of the People's Revolutionary Military Commission
- Li Zhuchen (China Democratic National Construction Association)
- Li Zhangda (National Salvation Association; died on December 9, 1953)
- Zhang Bojun (Peasants and Workers Democratic Party), concurrently a member of the Political Affairs Committee, and a member of the Standing Committee of the First National Committee of the Chinese People's Political Consultative Conference
- Cheng Qian (Revolutionary Committee of the Chinese Kuomintang), Vice Chairman of the People's Revolutionary Military Commission
- Zhang Xiruo (non-partisan), member of the Standing Committee of the National Committee of the Chinese People's Political Consultative Conference
- Tan Ming-shu (Democratic Alliance)
- Tan Pingshan (Democratic Alliance), also Minister of State
- Zhang Nanxian (non-partisan)
- Liu Yazi (Revolutionary Committee of the Chinese Kuomintang)
- Zhang Dongsun (China Democratic League)
- Long Yun (Revolutionary Committee of the Chinese Kuomintang), also a member of the People's Revolutionary Military Commission

=== Secretary General of the Central People's Government ===
- Lin Boqu (elected by the Central People's Government Committee)
