= Xiang Zhejun =

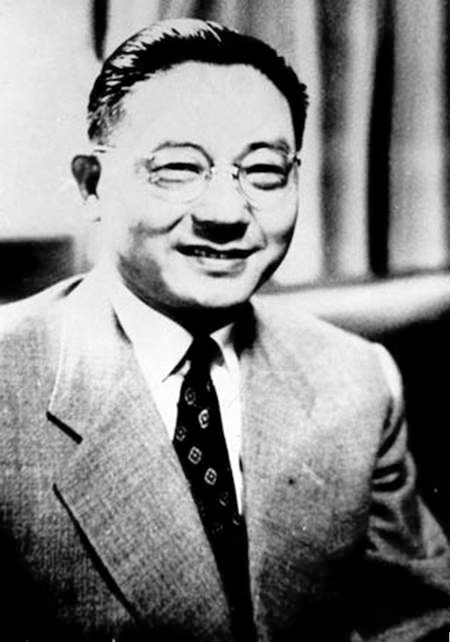
Xiang Zhejun

Xiang Zhejun (Chinese: 向哲浚; Wade–Giles: Hsiang Che-chun; 1892—1987), native of Ningxiang county in Hunan province, was a Chinese jurist and prosecutor at the International Military Tribunal for the Far East.

== Education and early career ==
After graduating from Tsinghua University in 1917, Xiang went to the United States for further studies and enrolled at Yale University, where he earned a Bachelor of Arts degree in American and English Literature. He later transferred to the George Washington University Law School, where he studied international law and obtained his JD. After his return to China in 1925, Xiang Zhejun taught law at a number of schools, including Peking University and Beijing Jiaotong University. After the establishment of the Nationalist Government in 1927, Xiang held a number of positions in several government bureaus, including the ministries of Justice and Foreign Affairs.

== Tokyo Trial ==
In January 1946, Xiang was appointed the prosecutor for the Republic of China in the International Military Tribunal for the Far East, in preparation for which he vigorously collected oral and material evidence. Instead of prosecuting Japanese war crimes dating from the outbreak of hostilities in July 1937, Xiang also managed to persuade the court to prosecute Japanese wars crimes dating back to the Huanggutun Incident in 1928, when the Kanto Army assassinated Zhang Zuolin. During the trial, Xiang Zhejun become known for confronting defendants such as Iwane Matsui, Itagaki Seishiro and Doihara Kenji with evidence establishing their guilt of war crimes. Among other things Xiang established the guilt of Iwane, who was confronted with evidence of the atrocities, including Harold John Timperley's reports in the Manchester Guardian.

However, following the political directives of Chiang Kai-shek, Xiang did not investigate crimes committed by the Imperial Japanese Army in Communist based areas such as the "Three Alls Policy". Thus, military leaders like Yasuji Okamura were not prosecuted before the Tokyo tribunal. He also let down evidence about the use of chemical weapons authorized by the Imperial General Headquarters.

== Later life ==
After his return to China, Xiang Zhejun refused Chiang Kai-shek's invitation to serve as a prosecutor in the Supreme Court, but chose to teach at Shanghai College of Finance and Economics instead. He remained on the mainland after the establishment of the People's Republic of China. Even though Xiang had already retired when the Cultural Revolution erupted in 1965, he became a target for political persecution. He died in Shanghai in 1987 at the age of 91.
