= Former Residence of He Shuheng =

- 何叔衡故居
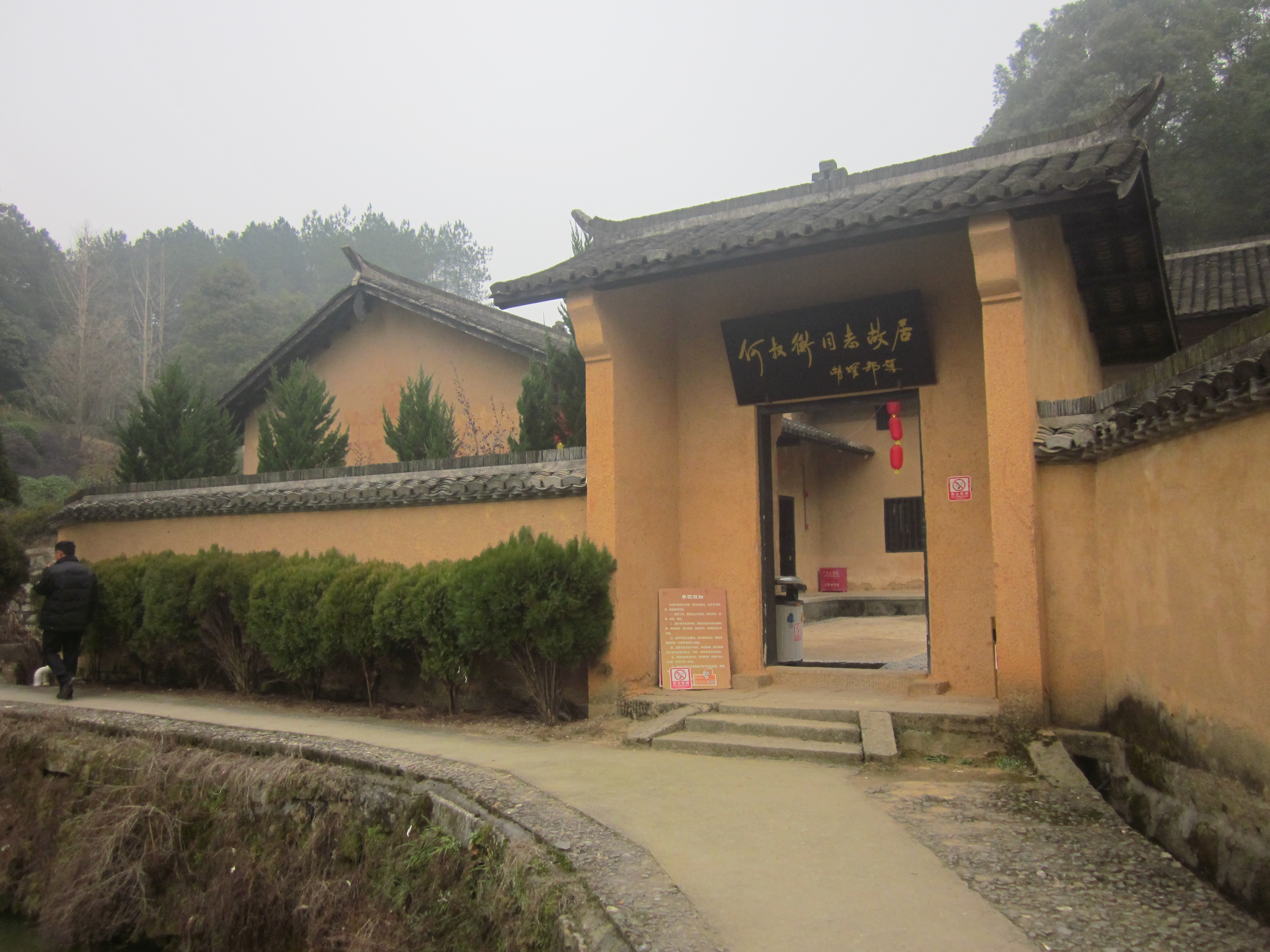
- The Main Entrance of the Former Residence of He Shuheng.

- Location within Hunan

General information
- Type: Traditional folk houses
- Location: Shatian Township, Ningxiang, Hunan, China
- Coordinates: 28°03′06″N 112°02′35″E
- Completed: 1785
- Renovated: 1972
- Owner: Government of Ningxiang

Technical details
- Floor area: 2,600 m^{2} (28,000 sq ft)

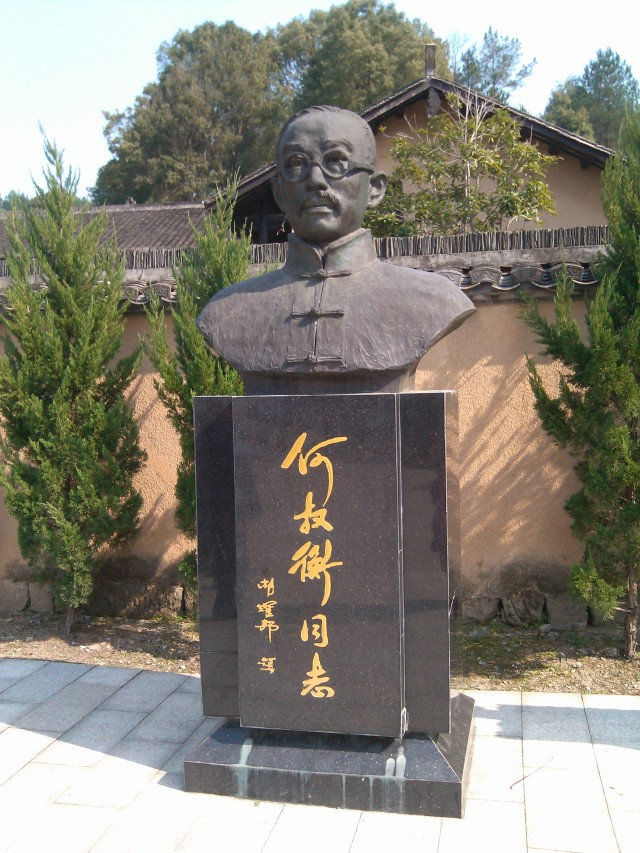
The Bronze Statue of He Shuheng in He Shuheng's Former Residence.

The Former Residence of He Shuheng or He Shuheng's Former Residence (Chinese: 何叔衡故居; pinyin: Hé Shūhéng Gùjū) is a museum and tourist attraction created from the house formerly owned by the Chinese communist revolutionary, He Shuheng. The house was built in the late Qing dynasty (1644–1911) and it is located in Shatian Township in Ningxiang, Hunan Province. The building covers an area of about 2,600 square metres (28,000 sq ft).

== History ==
The house was built by He Shuheng's forebears in 1785, which was the fiftieth year of the Qianlong era (1736–1795) of the Qing dynasty (1644–1911).

On May 27, 1876, in the second year of the age of Guangxu of Guangxu Emperor, He Shuheng was born in here. He lived there for about 26 years.

In 1917, when Mao Zedong and Xiao Zisheng did social research, they lived here for three nights.

In 1972, the People's Government of Shatian township rebuilt the house and on September 1, it was listed as a "Historical and Cultural Sites Protected at the Provincial Level".

Later, Liao Mosha wrote "The Martyr's Former Residence of He Shuheng" (何叔衡烈士故居) and Hu Yaobang wrote "He Shuheng's Former Residence".

On May 30, 2006, the Vice Secretary-General of Changsha Municipal Committee of the CPC Yi Fengkui (Chinese: 易凤葵) attended the unveiling of a statue of He Shuheng.
