= Xiangzikou =

Xiangzikou Town 巷子口镇
- Town
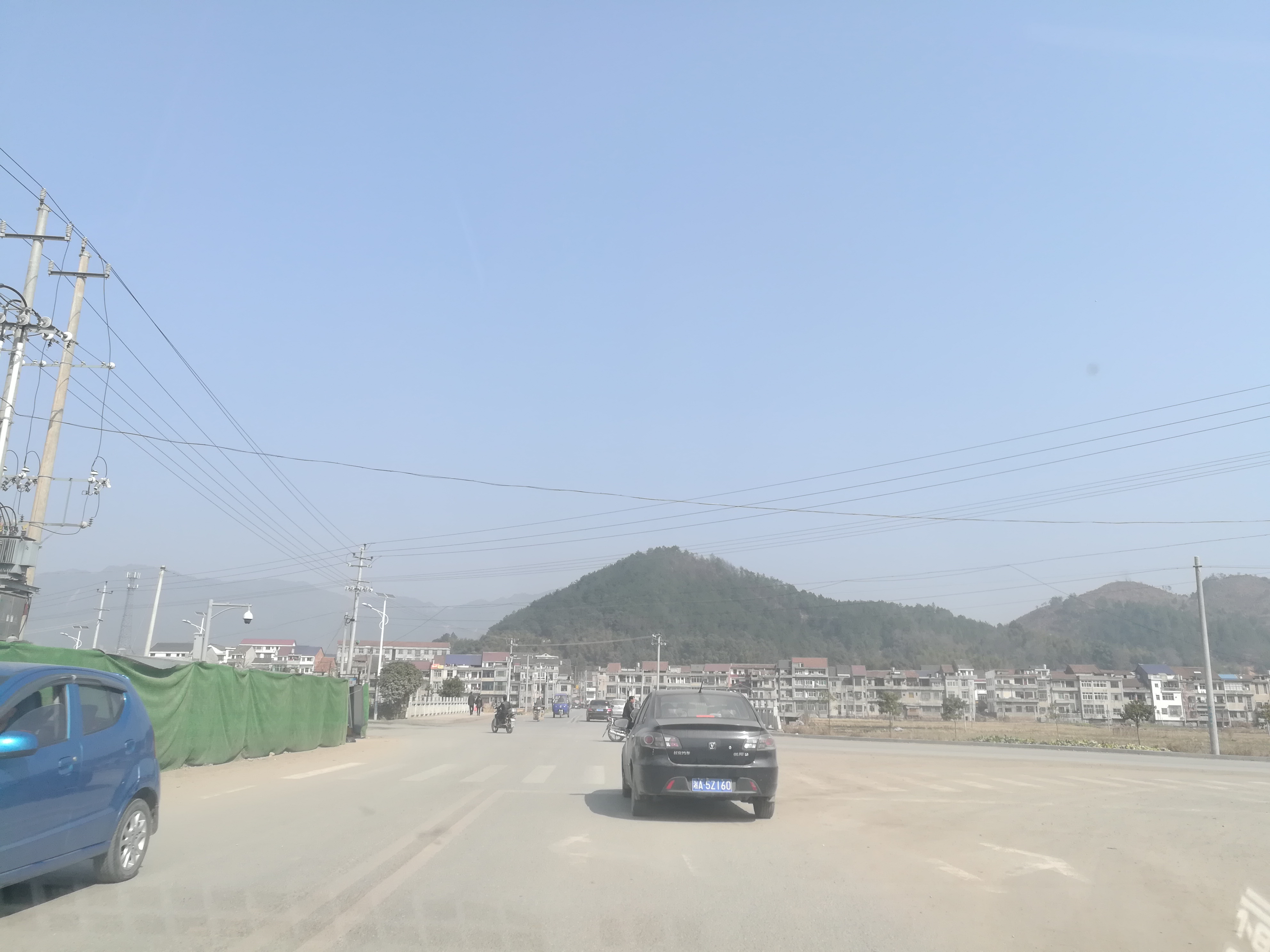
- Residential buildings in Xiangzikou

- Location in Hunan
- Coordinates: 28°05′52″N 111°57′41″E
- Country: People's Republic of China
- Province: Hunan
- Prefecture-level city: Changsha
- County: Ningxiang

Area
  - Total: 105.8 km^{2} (40.8 sq mi)

Population
  - Total: 42,000
  - Density: 400/km^{2} (1,000/sq mi)
- Time zone: UTC+08:00 (China Standard)
- Postal code: 410629
- Area code: 0731
- Website: www.nxcity.gov.cn/nxxzk/index.htm

Chinese name
- Traditional Chinese: 巷子口鎮
- Simplified Chinese: 巷子口镇
Transcriptions
Standard Mandarin
- Hanyu Pinyin: Xiàngzǐkǒu Zhèn

Xiangzikou (Chinese: 巷子口镇) is a town in Ningxiang City, Hunan Province, China. It is surrounded by Dafu Town on the west, Weishan Township on the north, Huangcai Town on the east, and Longtian Town and Shatian Township on the south. As of the 2000 census it had a population of 36,816 and an area of 105.8 square kilometres (40.8 sq mi).

== Administrative divisions ==
The town is divided into nine villages and one community:

- Xiangzikou Community (巷子口社区)
- Lianhua (联花村)
- Guanshan (官山村)
- Shuanghe (双河村)
- Shichong (狮冲村)
- Zhitian (直田村)
- Huanghe (黄鹤村)
- Xianlongtan (仙龙潭村)
- Fureng (扶峰村)
- Jinfengyuan (金枫园村)

== Geography ==
The highest point in the town is Mount Fuwang (扶王山) which stands 969.8 metres (3,182 ft) above sea level.

== Economy ==
Chinese chestnut is important to the economy.

== Education ==
There is one senior high school located with the town limits: Ningxiang Tenth Senior High School (宁乡十中).

== Culture ==
Huaguxi is the most influential local theater.

== Transport ==
The County Road X104 runs south to Xiangzikou Community, intersecting with County Road X107, and turns right to Huangcai Town.

The County Road X107 begins at Xiangzikou Community and travels north to Weishan Township.

The County Road X210 begins at Xiangzikou Community and travels southwest to Shatian Township.

== Attractions ==
The Tombs of Zhang Jun, Zhang Shi and Yi Fu are tourist attractions.

On 16 December 2011, local people discovered 128 bridges, which were built during the reign of the Qianlong Emperor (1735–1796) of the Qing dynasty (1644–1911).

== Notable individuals ==
- Yi Fu (易祓; Yì Fú), was a noted writer and poet of Song dynasty.
