= North China People's Government =

Regional government in China (1948–1949)

- 華北人民政府; Huáběi Rénmín Zhèngfǔ

Agency overview
- Formed: 26 September 1948; 77 years ago
- Dissolved: 27 October 1949; 76 years ago
- Superseding agency: North China Affairs Department of the Central People's Government
- Agency executives: Dong Biwu, Chairman; Bo Yibo, Lan Gongwu, Yang Xiufeng, Vice Chairpersons

The North China People's Government was a large administrative region people's government established by the Chinese Communist Party between 26 September 1948 and 31 October 1949. It is regarded as the predecessor of the Central People's Government.

== History ==
On 12 November 1947, the Jin-Cha-Ji Field Army captured Shijiazhuang, and the Jin-Cha-Ji Border Region and the Jin-Ji -Lu-Yu Border Region were connected. On 16 February 1948, Liu Shaoqi sent a telegram proposing the merger of the Chinese Communist Party (CCP), government and military institutions of Jin-Cha-Ji and Jin-Ji-Lu-Yu. On 9 May 1948, the CCP Central Committee issued the "Notice on Changing the Organization, Jurisdiction and Personnel of the North China and Central Plains Liberated Areas," which officially decided to merge them into the North China Bureau, the North China Joint Administrative Committee and the North China Military Region. On 12 June 1948, the Jin-Ji-Lu-Yu Border Region Government and the Jin- Cha-Ji Border Region Administrative Committee officially started working together and were renamed the North China Joint Administrative Committee. On 26 June, a joint meeting of the resident members of the two district councils was held in Shijiazhuang, and a resolution on convening the North China Provisional People's Congress to generate a unified North China People's Government was passed.

From August 7 to 19, a secret North China Provisional People's Congress (publicly known as the Shijiazhuang Production Work Conference, held every evening at 7 PM) was convened in the Liberation Auditorium (now the People's Cinema) in Shijiazhuang. A total of 541 representatives were elected, over 80% of whom were representatives of workers, peasants, and laborers. The Congress elected 27 members, including Dong Biwu, to form the North China People's Government Committee. Two-thirds of the committee members were representatives of workers, peasants, revolutionary intellectuals, and revolutionary soldiers, while one-third were members of "democratic parties" and independents. Twelve committee seats were reserved for election in cities not under CCP control. After the Congress, the Committee moved its offices to Wangzi Village, Pingshan County. On September 20, the first meeting of the North China People's Government Committee was held in Wangzi Village, Pingshan County (22 members were present), and officials were appointed.

The North China People's Government was formally established on September 26. On September 27, an announcement was issued: "The North China People's Government is hereby established. From this day forward, the former Jin-Ji-Lu-Yu Border Region Government and the Jin-Cha-Ji Border Region Administrative Committee are hereby abolished." In mid-October, due to overcrowding, the core units of the North China People's Government moved to Dongye Village, Pingshan County, while some departments remained in Wangzi Village. Due to Fu Zuoyi's plan to launch a blitzkrieg against Xibaipo, the North China People's Government moved to Yangquan. The second meeting of the North China People's Government Committee was held in Yangquan on 1 November 1948. Soon after, they returned to Dongye Village. The third meeting of the North China People's Government Committee was held on 1 December 1948. With the consent of the Shandong Provincial Government, the Shaanxi-Gansu-Ningxia Government, and the Jin-Sui Administrative Office, the People's Bank of China was established to oversee the financial and economic work of other major regions outside the Northeast and Central Plains areas under CCP control. The fourth meeting of the North China People's Government Committee was held in Dongye Village on December 15, 1948.

On 20 February 1949, the North China People's Government began its operations in Beiping. In early May 1949, the relocation was completed. On October 27, Chairman Mao Zedong of the Central People's Government issued an order to abolish the North China People's Government. On October 31, a meeting was held to transfer the North China People's Government to the Central People's Government Council.

== Organizational Structure ==
- Chairman: Dong Biwu
- Vice Chairmen: Bo Yibo, Lan Gongwu, Yang Xiufeng
- Members of the North China People's Government: Dong Biwu, Nie Rongzhen, Bo Yibo, Xu Xiangqian, Teng Daiyuan, Huang Jing, Xie Juecai, Fan Wenlan, Cheng Fangwu, Yang Xiufeng, and 27 others.
- Secretary-General Tao Xijin, Deputy Secretaries-General Jin Cheng, and Dong Yueqian
  - Zhao Xiushan, Head of Documents Section; Ma Yongshun, Deputy Head of Documents Section
  - Feng Zhishan, Director of the Confidential Office
- Councilor Anzhai Ren
- Li Dihua, Director of the Foreign Affairs Management Office
- Minister of Civil Affairs Lan Gongwu (concurrently), Vice Minister Lei Renmin
- Minister of Education/North China Education Commission Chao Zhefu, Vice Ministers Liu Aifeng and Sun Wenshu
- Finance Minister Rong Zihe, Vice Minister Wu Bo
- Minister of Industry and Commerce Yao Yilin, Vice Minister Lin Haiyun
- Minister of Agriculture Song Shaowen, Vice Minister Zhang Chong
- Minister of Justice Xie Juecai, Vice Minister Guo Renzhi
- Minister of Transport Wu Jingtian, Vice Ministers Liu Jianzhang, Zhang Wenang, and Li Liang
  - The Navigation Administration Bureau was established on April 1, 1949. Its purpose was to "unify the leadership of state-owned shipping companies such as the Tianjin Navigation Administration Bureau, the Tianjin Merchants Bureau, and the Tanggu New Port Engineering Bureau, and to lead and manage foreign and private shipping companies, as well as water transportation in North China." Director Zhang Wen'ang was appointed.
- Labor Bureau Director Li Zaiwen, Deputy Director Zhao Guoqiang
- The North China Finance and Economic Committee is headed by Dong Biwu (concurrently), with Bo Yibo (concurrently) and Huang Jing (concurrently) as deputy heads; Fang Yi is a member and secretary-general; and members include Zeng Shan, Jia Tuofu, Yao Yilin, Nan Hanchen, Rong Zihe, Yang Xiufeng, Song Shaowen, Wu Jingtian, and Zhao Erlu.
- Xing Zhaotang, Director of the North China Water Resources Commission, and Xu Zheng and Wang Huayun, deputy directors.
- Xie Juecai, Director of the North China Legal Affairs Committee; members: Lan Gongwu, Guo Renzhi, Chen Jinkun, Jia Qian, Wang Feiran, Xu Jianguo, Song Shaowen, Zhang Shushi, Li Mu'an (full-time but not yet in office), and An Zhicheng (full-time).
- Chen Jinkun, President of the North China People's Court ; Jia Qian, Presiding Judge; and Wang Feiran, Deputy Presiding Judge.
- Yang Xiufeng (concurrently) serves as the President of the North China People's Supervisory Commission, Huang Songling and Yu Li ( Dong Luan ) serve as Vice Presidents, and Zhang Shushi, Zhang Muyao, Wang Fuchu and Wang Chengzhou serve as Supervisory Commission members.
- Minister of Health In Hee Peng, Vice Ministers Zhu Lian and Liu Heyi
- Minister of Public Security Xu Jianguo, Vice Minister Yang Qiqing
- On October 1, 1948, the North China Bank merged with the Jinnan Bank and the Jin-Cha-Ji Border Region Bank. The General Manager was Nan Hanchen, and the Deputy Managers were Hu Jingyun and Guan Xuewen.
- Minister of State Enterprises Huang Jing, Vice Ministers Liu Ding, Xu Daben, and Lai Jifa
  - Bao Guobao, General Manager of North China Power Company
- North China Trade Corporation
- North China Literature and Art Committee
- Beiyue District
- Jizhong District
- Jinan District
- Taihang District
- Taiyue District
- Jinzhong District
- Hebei-Shandong-Henan region
- Shijiazhuang City

It administered 5 provinces (Hebei, Shanxi, Pingyuan, Chahar, and Suiyuan), 2 cities (Beiping and Tianjin), 26 special districts, 334 counties and banners, and has a population of 49.61 million.

== North China Joint Administrative Committee ==
During the period from the establishment of the North China People's Government to the joint office of the Jin-Ji-Lu-Yu Border Region Government and the Jin- Cha-Ji Border Region Administrative Committee, although it was called the North China Joint Administrative Committee, it did not officially start working or use its seals, and there were no traces of its activities. Chairman Dong Biwu, Vice Chairman Huang Jing, and Vice Chairman Yang Xiufeng did not take office.
