= He Shuheng =

Chinese politician (1876–1935)

- 何叔衡
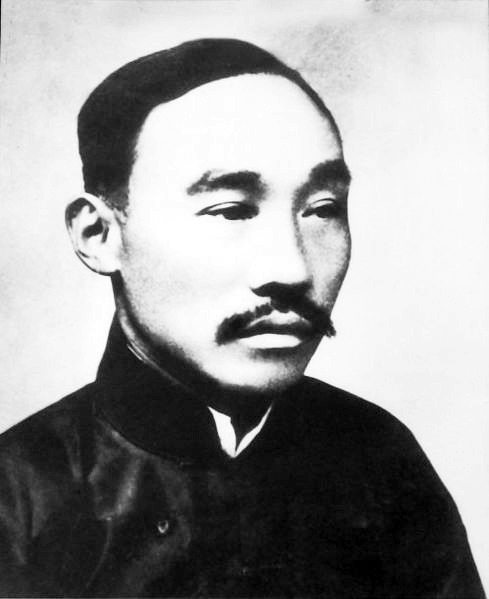

Personal details
- Born: 7 May 1876 Ningxiang, Hunan, China
- Died: 24 February 1935 (aged 58) Changting, Fujian, China
- Cause of death: Executed by the Kuomintang
- Party: Chinese Communist Party
- Education: Hunan First Normal University

Chinese name
- Simplified Chinese: 何叔衡
- Traditional Chinese: 何叔衡
Transcriptions
Standard Mandarin
- Hanyu Pinyin: Hé Shūhéng

He Shuheng (Chinese: 何叔衡; pinyin: Hé Shūhéng; 7 May 1876 – 24 February 1935) was a Chinese Communist revolutionary, born in Ningxiang, Hunan province.

== Biography ==
In 1914, He made acquaintance with Mao Zedong while at Hunan Normal University, and the two would eventually become close friends. In April 1918, He and Mao founded the Xinmin Society. In 1920, the two friends also launched the Russian Study Institute.

In July 1921, He and Mao traveled to Shanghai to attend the 1st National Congress of the Chinese Communist Party, as representatives of Changsha. After the congress, He became a member of the CCP's Hunan committee. During the first cooperation between the Kuomintang (KMT) and the CCP, He was a member of the KMT's executive committee and the supervision committee of the KMT's local party in Hunan. In 1927, He went to Shanghai. After the Shanghai massacre, He secretly established a print factory for the CCP in Changsha.

In April 1928, He went to Russia to attend the 6th National Congress of the Chinese Communist Party. He then entered Moscow Sun Yat-sen University, where his classmates included fellow party members Xu Teli, Wu Yuzhang, Dong Biwu, and Lin Boqu.

In July 1930, He went back to China, and took charge of the National Huji Institute and organized the rescue and transfer to safe places of arrested communists.

In the fall of 1931, He was elected to key posts in the Jiangxi Soviet. Later, with his appointment arranged by Mao Zedong, he served as a member of the People's Committee of the Chinese Soviet Republic as a secretary of worker-peasant inspection. However, he was dismissed from this position because he was targeted for criticism on the context of the campaign against the "Luo Ming Line" launched by Bo Gu.

Instead of taking part in the Long March, however, He chose to stay behind in the south and engage in guerilla fighting. On February 24, 1935, He was surrounded and killed by Kuomintang troops in Changting, Fujian.
