= Central People's Government (1949–1954) =

Central government of China

Central People's Government of the People's Republic of China 中華人民共和國中央人民政府
- National Emblem of China
- Formation: 1 October 1949
- Extinction: 27 September 1954
- Founding document: Common Program of the Chinese People's Political Consultative Conference
- Country: China

Chinese Communist Party (CCP)
- Leader: Chairman of the CCP

Legislative branch
- Legislature: Chinese People's Political Consultative Conference (CPPCC)
- Chair: Chairman of the CPPCC

Executive branch
- Leader: Chairman of the Central People's Government
- Main body: Central People's Government Council
- Main organ: Government Administration Council

Judicial branch
- Court: Supreme People's Court
- Procuratorate: Supreme People's Procuratorate

Central People's Government of the People's Republic of China
- Traditional Chinese: 中華人民共和國中央人民政府
- Simplified Chinese: 中华人民共和国中央人民政府
Transcriptions
Standard Mandarin
- Hanyu Pinyin: Zhōnghuá Rénmín Gònghéguó Zhōngyāng Rénmín Zhèngfǔ
- Wade–Giles: Chung^{1}-hua^{2} Jen^{2}-min^{2} Kung^{4}-ho^{2}-kuo^{2} Chung^{1}-yang^{1} Jen^{2}-min^{2} Cheng^{4}-fu^{3}

The Central People's Government was the central government of the People's Republic of China between 1 October 1949 and 20 September 1954. The government was formed in accordance with the Common Program and the Government Organic Law promulgated by the 1st National Committee of the Chinese People's Political Consultative Conference (CPPCC).

The Central People's Government served as the provisional government for exercising state power before the 1st National People's Congress (NPC) was elected to draft the new constitution of China. The government ceased to exist after the enactment of the Constitution of the People's Republic of China on 20 September 1954, and was reformed into the constitutional government of China.

Since 1954, the "Central People's Government" has been synonymous with the "State Council" in the current government of China.

== History ==
On 27 September 1949, the first plenary session of the Chinese People's Political Consultative Conference (CPPCC) passed the Organic Law of the Central People's Government. It also elected the Central People's Government Council on 30 September 1949. The government was then promulgated by Mao Zedong at the ceremony of Proclamation of the People's Republic of China on 1 October 1949.

On 20 September 1954, with the enactment of the Constitution of the People's Republic of China by the 1st National People's Congress (NPC). The Central People's Government ceased to exist and was reformed into the new constitutional government of China.

== Organizational structure ==
The Central People's Government was then composed of:

Name	Chinese	Year
Central People's Government Council	中央人民政府委員會	1949 – 1954
Government Administration Council	政務院	1949 – 1954
People's Revolutionary Military Commission	人民革命軍事委員會	1949 – 1954
Supreme People's Court	最高人民法院	1949 – 1954
Supreme People's Procuratorate	最高人民檢察署	1949 – 1954
State Planning Commission	國家計畫委員會	1952 – 1954
Regional administrative councils	大區行政委員會	1953 – 1954

Between 1953 and 1954, there were 6 regional administrative councils:

- North China Administrative Council (華北行政委員會)
- East China Administrative Council (華東行政委員會)
- South Central China Administrative Council (中南行政委員會)
- Northeast China Administrative Council (東北行政委員會)
- Northwestern China Administrative Council (西北行政委員會)
- Southwestern China Administrative Council (西南行政委員會)

In September 1954, with the enactment of the new constitution of China:

- Agencies of the Government Administration Council became part of the State Council (国务院).
- The People's Revolutionary Military Commission became the National Defense Commission (国防委员会) and is directly subordinates to the Chairman of China (国家主席).
- The State Planning Commission was placed under the State Council.
- The 6 regional administrative councils was defunct and all Province-level People's Government is directly subordinates to the State Council.

== See also ==
- The "Central People's Government" since 1954: State Council of the People's Republic of China
- Seal of the People's Government of the People's Republic of China
