= Xie Juezai =

Chinese politician

- 谢觉哉
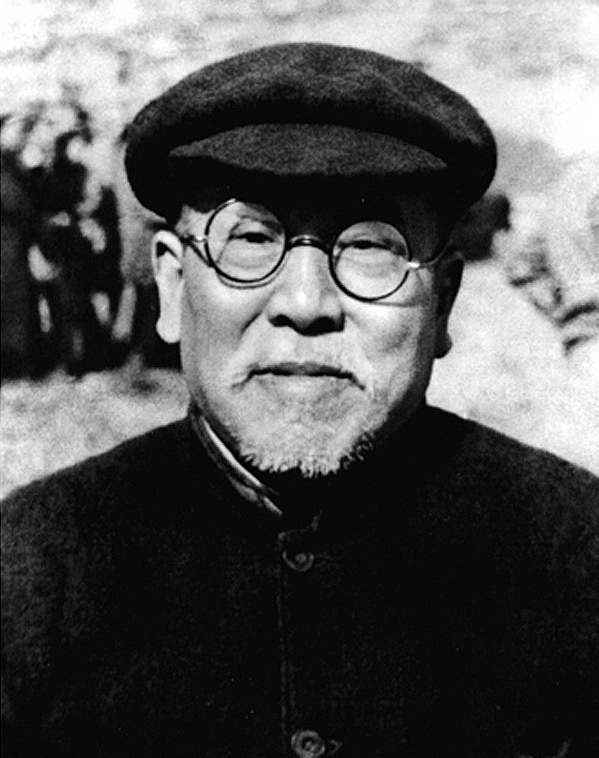
- Xie Juezai in 1941

President of the Supreme People's Court
- In office 27 April 1959 – 3 January 1965
- Preceded by: Dong Biwu
- Succeeded by: Yang Xiufeng

Personal details
- Born: 1884 Ningxiang, Hunan, China
- Died: 1971 (aged 86–87)
- Party: Chinese Communist Party
- Children: Xie Fei
- Occupation: Politician

Chinese name
- Simplified Chinese: 谢觉哉
- Traditional Chinese: 謝覺哉
Transcriptions
Standard Mandarin
- Hanyu Pinyin: Xiè Juézāi

Birth name
- Simplified Chinese: 维鋆
- Traditional Chinese: 維鋆
Transcriptions
Standard Mandarin
- Hanyu Pinyin: Wéijūn

Courtesy name
- Simplified Chinese: 焕南
- Traditional Chinese: 煥南
Transcriptions
Standard Mandarin
- Hanyu Pinyin: Huànnán

Pseudonym
- Simplified Chinese: 觉斋
- Traditional Chinese: 覺齋
Transcriptions
Standard Mandarin
- Hanyu Pinyin: Juézhāi

Xie Juezai (Chinese: 谢觉哉; pinyin: Xiè Juézāi; 1884–1971), also known by his courtesy name Huannan and his alias Juezhai, was a Chinese politician, activist, and educator who played an important role in the development of China's legal field. His main works are collected in "The Collected Works of Xie Juezai".

== Biography ==
In his early years, he taught at Hunan Provincial First Normal School.

From 1918 to 1919, under the influence of progressive ideology, he actively participated in the May Fourth Movement and founded the "Ningxiang Xunkan".

In August 1920, he served as editor-in-chief of Hunan Popular News.

In January 1921, he joined the Xinmin Society founded by Mao Zedong and others.

In 1923, he joined the Chinese Kuomintang.

In 1925, he joined the Chinese Communist Party (CCP), and in early 1926, he served as editor-in-chief of the Communist Party's publication "Hunan Bimonthly". In the summer of the same year, he served as editor of "Hunan Daily" and editor-in-chief of "Hunan People's Daily". In the same year, he was elected as the executive member of the provincial party department at the second Kuomintang Hunan Provincial Party Congress, and served as the Minister of the Workers' Department.

In 1927, he organized a party school in the name of the Kuomintang Provincial Party Department and served as the principal.

In March 1928, he went to Shanghai to edit the Red Flag, a publication of the Central Committee of the Chinese Communist Party.

In 1930, he was in charge of the organization and leadership of Shanghai Poster, founded by the Central Committee of the Chinese Communist Party.

In the autumn of 1931, he entered the revolutionary base in western Hunan and Hubei, and served as secretary-general of the Western Hunan-Hubei Provincial Party Committee, deputy minister of the Ministry of Culture, and editor-in-chief of "Workers and Peasants Daily". Later, he was transferred to the Education Director of the Party School of the Provincial Party Committee.

In 1933, he entered the Central Soviet Area and served as secretary of the Provisional Central Government of the Chinese Soviet Republic and Mao Zedong.

In January 1934, he served as secretary-general and minister of interior affairs of the Central Workers' and Peasants' Democratic Government, as well as secretary of the Party branch of the central government agency. In October of the same year, he participated in the Long March.

After arriving in northern Shaanxi in 1935, he served as Minister of Internal Affairs and Secretary General of the Central Workers' and Peasants' Democratic Government.

At the beginning of 1937, he served as Attorney General and Acting President of the Supreme Court and Chairman of the Audit Committee. After the Marco Polo Bridge Incident, he served as the representative of the Eighth Route Army Office of the Central Committee of the Chinese Communist Party in Lanzhou.

In 1939, he was appointed vice president of the Central Party School of the Chinese Communist Party.

In 1940, he served as deputy secretary of the Central Bureau of the Shaanxi-Gansu-Ningxia Border Region of the CCP.

In 1942, he served as the vice-chairman of the Senate of the Shaanxi-Gansu-Ningxia Border Region.

In June 1946, he was appointed chairman of the Legal Issues Research Committee of the Central Committee of the CCP.

In 1948, he served as a member of the North China People's Government and Minister of Justice.

In September 1949, he participated in the first plenary session of the Chinese People's Political Consultative Conference. After the founding of the People's Republic of China, he served successively as Minister of Internal Affairs of the Central People's Government, member of the Legislative Affairs Committee of the Central People's Government, member of the Political and Legal Committee of the Government Affairs Council, and Vice President of the New Law Research Institute.

In September 1956, he was elected as an alternate member of the Central Committee at the 8th National Congress of the Chinese Communist Party.

In April 1959, he was appointed president of the Supreme People's Court. From December 1964 to 1971, he served as vice chairman of the National Committee of the Chinese People's Political Consultative Conference.

In May 1966, he was appointed a member of the Central Committee at the Eleventh Plenary Session of the Eighth Central Committee of the Chinese Communist Party.

== Personal life ==
He has a son named Xie Fei who is a film director.

Government offices
Preceded by none	Minister of Domestic Affairs; 1949–1959	Succeeded by Qian Ying
Legal offices
Preceded by Dong Biwu	President of the Supreme People's Court; 1959–1965	Succeeded by Yang Xiufeng
