= Dong Biwu =

Chinese politician (1886–1975)

- 董必武
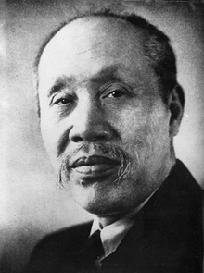

Acting Chairman of China
- In office 24 February 1972 – 17 January 1975
- Preceded by: Liu Shaoqi
- Succeeded by: Zhu De (as Chairman of the SCNPC); Li Xiannian (as President, 1983)

2nd Vice Chairman of China
- In office 27 April 1959 – 17 January 1975 Serving with Soong Ching-ling
- President: Liu Shaoqi vacant (after 1968)
- Preceded by: Zhu De
- Succeeded by: Ulanhu (1983)

Secretary of the Central Supervisory Commission
- In office 31 March 1955 – 12 August 1968
- Preceded by: Zhu De
- Succeeded by: Chen Yun

President of the Supreme People's Court
- In office 27 September 1954 – 27 April 1959
- Preceded by: Shen Junru
- Succeeded by: Xie Juezai

Personal details
- Born: 5 March 1886 Huanggang, Hubei, Qing Empire
- Died: 2 April 1975 (aged 89) Beijing, People's Republic of China
- Party: Tongmenghui (1911–1912); Kuomintang (1913–1927); Chinese Communist Party (1921–1975)

Dong Biwu
- Chinese: 董必武
Transcriptions
Standard Mandarin
- Hanyu Pinyin: Dǒng Bìwǔ
- Wade–Giles: Tung Pi-wu

Dong Biwu (Chinese: 董必武; pinyin: Dǒng Bìwǔ; Wade–Giles: Tung Pi-wu, 5 March 1886 – 2 April 1975) was a Chinese communist revolutionary and politician who served as acting Chairman of the People's Republic of China from 1972 to 1975. A veteran of the 1911 Revolution, he was one of the founders of the Chinese Communist Party (CCP), representing Wuhan at the party's founding congress in 1921. He later worked in the Jiangxi Soviet and Yan'an, where he was one of the "Five Elders of Yan'an". In 1945, he was the only Communist member of the Chinese delegation to the San Francisco Conference, and he signed the Charter of the United Nations. He chaired the North China People's Government from 1948 to 1949. After the founding of the People's Republic, he was a vice premier, President of the Supreme People's Court from 1954 to 1959 and Vice Chairman of the People's Republic from 1959 until 1975.

== Early life ==
Dong Biwu was born on 5 March 1886 in Huang'an County, now Hong'an County, in Hubei. Accounts of his family background differ, as the German sinologist Wolfgang Bartke describes it as a landlord family, while a 2026 People's Daily article by the CCP's Party History and Documentation Research Institute describes it as a poor family of schoolteachers. His father and an uncle were scholars and teachers.

Dong received a classical education at home. In 1901, he passed the lowest level of the imperial examination, gaining the degree of xiucai. He then attended a middle school in Wuchang that taught a modern curriculum, where he first encountered reformist and revolutionary ideas. By 1911, he was a schoolmaster in Huangzhou.

== Early revolutionary career ==
After the Wuchang Uprising began in October 1911, Dong reached Wuchang on 13 October and joined the republican forces, working in the finance department of the revolutionary government in Wuhan. He joined the Tongmenghui in late 1911, and in 1912 he sat on the council of its Hubei branch. He later headed the salt tax bureau at Yichang.

After the failure of the Second Revolution in 1913, Dong fled to Japan. In 1914, he entered Nihon University in Tokyo to study law, and in Japan he joined Sun Yat-sen's Chinese Revolutionary Party. In June 1915, he returned to Hubei to organize opposition to Yuan Shikai. He was arrested and imprisoned late that year and was released after Yuan's death in June 1916, after which he went back to Tokyo to complete his studies. The party history institute states that he was arrested twice during this period. He finished his law course in 1917 and returned to China to take part in Sun's Constitutional Protection Movement.

== Founding of the Communist Party ==
In 1919, Dong was in Shanghai, where he took part in the May Fourth Movement. According to a 2021 Jiangsu Television documentary, it was there that Li Hanjun introduced him to the October Revolution, Soviet Russia and Marxist writings. Dong later called Li his "teacher of Marxism". In 1920, Dong helped found the Wuhan Private Middle School, where he served on the board and taught Chinese. The same year, Li came to Wuhan to discuss setting up a party organization there, and Dong later recalled that he agreed to join and took charge of organizing the Hubei branch.

Dong, Chen Tanqiu and others then formed an early communist group in Wuhan, which used the middle school as a base and set up a Socialist Youth League branch and a Marxist study society. The party history institute and Xinhua date the group's founding to the autumn of 1920. The Jiangsu Television documentary places it in August 1920, at a meeting of seven people at Dong's home, while other accounts give the winter of 1920–1921.

In July 1921, Dong and Chen represented the Wuhan group at the 1st National Congress of the Chinese Communist Party in Shanghai. According to the party history institute, he took part in drafting the party's program at the congress. Of the delegates, only Dong and Mao Zedong later held high office in Beijing after 1949. They were also the only two delegates who attended the proclamation of the People's Republic of China in 1949.

== Revolutionary period ==
=== Hubei and the First United Front ===
After the congress, Dong served on the party's Wuhan and Hubei committees. In 1922, he took his ailing father home to Huang'an, where his father died, and he returned to Wuchang before the railway strike of February 1923 on the Beijing–Hankou line. During the First United Front between the CCP and the Kuomintang (KMT), Dong was publicly known as a KMT member while the CCP was still underground, and he led KMT party work in Hubei. In January 1926, he attended the Second National Congress of the KMT in Canton. Early that year, he went to Changsha with Bai Chongxi and Chen Mingshu to win over Tang Shengzhi to the Northern Expedition. After Wuhan fell to the Northern Expedition forces in the autumn of 1926, he worked at the Hubei provincial headquarters of the KMT and served as director of the Hubei department of agriculture and industry. The party history institute states that he also organized peasant associations in the province.

In mid-1927, when the KMT government in Wuhan purged the communists, Dong fled to the Japanese concession in Hankou. Wanted by the KMT, he went underground and helped plan an uprising in eastern Hubei. In December 1927, disguised as a sailor, he traveled to Shanghai and then to Japan, where he hid in Kyoto.

=== Soviet Union, Jiangxi and the Long March ===
Several months later, pressure from the Japanese police forced Dong to leave for the Soviet Union, and he reached Moscow by way of Siberia in September 1928. He studied in Moscow for four years and returned to China in 1932. In the Central Soviet Area in Jiangxi, he worked at the party school, and the party history institute describes him as deputy principal of the Marxist Communist School. He later became secretary of the Central Party Affairs Committee and head of the supreme court of the Chinese Soviet Republic. In January 1934, he was elected an alternate member of the Central Committee.

In October 1934, at nearly 50 years of age, Dong joined the Long March. After reaching northern Shaanxi in late 1935, he again headed the Central Party School, which moved with the party leadership to Bao'an and then to Yan'an. He also served as acting chairman of the government of the Shaan-Gan-Ning Border Region. In Yan'an, Mao called Dong, Lin Boqu, Xu Teli, Wu Yuzhang and Xie Juezai the "Five Elders of Yan'an" as a mark of respect, and the name remained in use afterward.

=== Second Sino-Japanese War ===
In December 1936, Dong was a member of Zhou Enlai's delegation to Xi'an during the Xi'an Incident, which ended with the release of Chiang Kai-shek. After the war with Japan began in July 1937, he accompanied Zhou to the talks that produced the Second United Front. In 1938, he was appointed to the People's Political Council. That year, the Sixth Plenum of the 6th Central Committee elected him to the Central Committee. He worked in Wuhan and then Chongqing with the party's Yangtze Bureau and Southern Bureau, becoming deputy secretary of the latter, and with the party newspaper Xinhua Daily. He was also secretary of the party's Chongqing working committee. After the New Fourth Army incident of January 1941, he was the only Communist who remained on the People's Political Council.

=== San Francisco Conference ===
On 26 March 1945, Dong was named the only Communist member of the Chinese delegation to the United Nations Conference on International Organization in San Francisco, which was led by T. V. Soong. According to the Chinese foreign ministry, the KMT government accepted him only under pressure. American diplomats in China reported that the CCP leadership in Yan'an had not been consulted, and that it had demanded three delegates of its own choosing, Zhou Enlai, Bo Gu and Dong. The diplomat John S. Service described Dong as elderly, unable to speak English and of secondary rank, and called him "the least suitable choice" for a Communist delegate. Yan'an nevertheless accepted the invitation, and because it expected the government delegation to keep Dong from expressing his views, it planned to work mainly through informal contacts with the press and other delegations. The CCP Central Committee defined the aims of the trip as "to win foreign friends, to improve the party's international position, and to try to stay and work in the United States".

Dong left China on 12 April 1945 and arrived in the United States ten days later. At the conference, he argued that independence should be the goal of the trusteeship system. He distributed 5,000 copies of a memorandum on China's liberated areas, which was published on 18 May 1945. On 26 June 1945, he signed the Charter of the United Nations with a writing brush. After the conference, he spent several months in the United States seeking support for the party, and he spoke to Chinese residents in New York's Chinatown. In November 1945, he called for the withdrawal of American troops from China. He returned on 26 November 1945 and reached Yan'an in December. In his absence, the 7th National Congress had elected him to the Central Committee and the Politburo.

=== Civil War and North China ===
In January 1946, Dong was a member of the CCP delegation to the Political Consultative Conference. During 1946 and early 1947, he was Zhou Enlai's deputy in negotiations with the KMT, and he led the party's office in Nanjing. After Zhou left Nanjing on 19 November 1946, Dong stayed behind with a small mission to keep a channel open, until he withdrew to Yan'an in early 1947. He also chaired the China Liberated Areas Relief Association, which handled relief supplies from the United Nations Relief and Rehabilitation Administration. He was later head of the party's finance and economics department and a secretary of its North China Bureau.

In May 1948, Dong became chairman of the North China United Administrative Committee. He was then chosen to lead the North China People's Government at Shijiazhuang, with Bo Yibo as first vice chairman. Sources date his election either to 18 August 1948 or to a meeting of the government committee on 20–24 September, and the government was inaugurated on 26 September 1948. The government moved to Peiping on 20 February 1949, and the Central People's Government dissolved it by an order of 27 October 1949. In September 1949, Dong was a delegate to the Chinese People's Political Consultative Conference, and on 22 September he reported to it on the draft Organic Law of the Central People's Government, whose drafting he had led.

== People's Republic of China ==
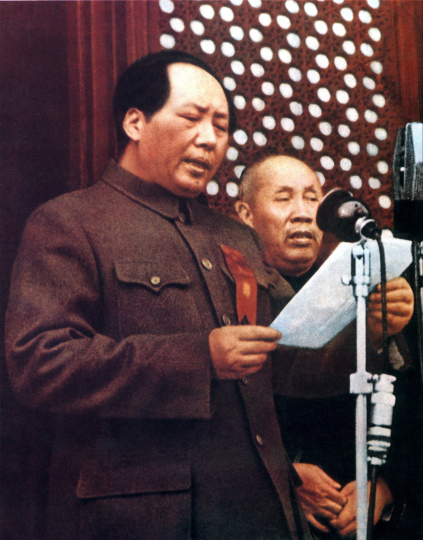
Dong standing behind Mao during the founding ceremony of the People's Republic of China in 1949

=== Government and legal work ===
After the founding of the People's Republic of China, Dong became one of four vice premiers of the Government Administration Council and chairman of its Political and Legal Affairs Committee. He led a work team to Nanjing and Shanghai to oversee the takeover of those cities. He also headed a central epidemic prevention committee set up during an outbreak of plague in northern Chahar, as well as the Central Disaster Relief Committee. According to the People's Court Daily, Mao proposed in 1950 that Dong serve as acting premier of the Government Administration Council. After floods in the Huai River basin in 1950, he led a campaign that collected more than 6.88 million sets of winter clothing for flood victims in northern Anhui and Henan in just over two months. He directed the central flood control headquarters and was a vice chairman of the People's Relief Administration, which was chaired by Soong Ching-ling.

In 1953, Dong became chairman of the China Political Science and Law Society, which he had helped to found. In 1954, he was appointed President of the Supreme People's Court, and he held the post until 1959. He took part in drafting the organic laws of the people's courts and the people's procuratorates. In 1955, he became head of the party's newly created Central Control Commission, and he continued in that role into the mid-1960s. In 1956, he gave a major report on the legal system. According to the party history institute, he held that acting according to law was the central link in strengthening the legal system, and that there must be laws to follow and those laws must be observed. He traveled to Sofia in 1954, to Ürümqi in September 1955, and to Bulgaria, Czechoslovakia and East Germany in 1958.

The writer He Bing argues that Dong was sidelined after he clashed with the mass-campaign approach to legal work during the Great Leap Forward. He Bing writes that at a meeting of the Supreme People's Court in April 1958, Dong said that slogans should be realistic and that the courts should not get ahead of the public security organs. In August 1958, Peng Zhen became head of the party's central political and legal affairs group, of which Dong was a member, and the Fourth National Judicial Work Conference reviewed the work of the courts over the previous eight years. According to He Bing, Dong accepted the criticism made at a joint meeting on 13 August 1958. On 25 March 1959, Dong asked in a letter not to be nominated again as president of the Supreme People's Court, and Mao replied that he agreed with the letter and that Dong should change jobs.

=== Vice Chairman ===
In April 1959, Dong was elected a Vice Chairman of the People's Republic of China, alongside Soong Ching-ling. Later that year, he defended Peng Dehuai from criticism at the Lushan Conference, yet still remained in favor with Mao, unlike others who stood up for the general.

=== Cultural Revolution and acting head of state ===
Accounts of Dong's experience during the Cultural Revolution differ, and the Biographical Dictionary of the People's Republic of China, edited by Song Yuwu, states that he remained unaffected by the political turmoil despite his relatively privileged background. It adds that he rose in prominence during these years, taking over many of the diplomatic and ceremonial duties previously held by the purged Liu Shaoqi, and attributes this to his special relationship with Mao since their first meeting at the founding congress in 1921. The party history institute, by contrast, states that Dong was falsely accused and persecuted during the Cultural Revolution, and that he still expressed confidence in the future in his poem "Jiushi chudu" ("On Turning Ninety"). Dong's younger son, Dong Lianghe, was jailed twice during the period, and He Bing writes that Dong said privately that his son was serving time in his place.

Writing in the law journal Science of Law, Ma Ling states that after Liu Shaoqi was overthrown, the state chairmanship could no longer function normally, and that Soong Ching-ling received the credentials of foreign envoys in her capacity as vice chairman. From 24 February 1972, Dong exercised the duties of diplomatic representation as acting chairman of the People's Republic of China. He Bing writes that after the death of Lin Biao, Dong was surprised to hear himself called acting state chairman in a broadcast. Dong was also a member of the Politburo and of its Standing Committee.

Dong's tenure as acting chairman ended on 17 January 1975, when the Fourth National People's Congress elected Zhu De chairman of its Standing Committee. The 1975 constitution abolished the post of state chairman and gave the power to receive foreign envoys to the Standing Committee of the National People's Congress. Dong became a vice chairman of the Standing Committee.

== Death ==
Dong died of illness in Beijing on 2 April 1975, at the age of 89. At his memorial, Ye Jianying said that Dong had "truly done good all his life" and was "a proletarian revolutionary boundlessly loyal to the party and the people". According to the People's Court Daily, Mao mourned his old comrade by listening to the Song dynasty poet Zhang Yuangan's ci poem "He xin lang". He Bing writes that the message of condolence from the Secretary-General of the United Nations described Dong as one of the founders of the United Nations.

== Personal life ==
In November 1910, Dong married Huang Junzhen, the daughter of a well-off family from Gaoqiao in Huang'an County. According to the People's Political Consultative Daily, she supported his revolutionary work and became the first woman in the Dong family to unbind her feet and cut her hair. She lost contact with him after he went underground in 1927, and in the spring of 1928 she went to Shanghai for news of him, returning to Huang'an after learning that he had gone to Japan. The newspaper states that she later learned that Dong had started a new family. After the Second Sino-Japanese War began, Dong brought her to Wuhan for a stay and asked his adopted daughter, Su Wei, to look after her. Huang died in the spring of 1943, after an illness that left her blind.

After arriving in Yan'an, Dong married He Lianzhi, a native of Wanyuan County in Sichuan who was born in 1905. She had joined the Fourth Front Army of the Red Army in 1933, and in 1936 she ran a relay station that cared for wounded soldiers as the army crossed the grasslands of the northwest. After 1949, she worked as a secretary in the office of the Legal Affairs Committee of the Government Administration Council, and she later became a member of the 5th National Committee of the CPPCC. She died in Beijing on 7 February 1980. In 2000, the couple's ashes were moved from Babaoshan Revolutionary Cemetery in Beijing to the memorial park at Dong's former residence in Hong'an County.

Dong had two sons, Dong Liangyu, who was born in March 1938, and Dong Lianghe, who was born in Yan'an in 1945, and a daughter, Dong Lianghui, who was born in 1941. Dong Lianghe was sent to work in the countryside in Hebei and returned to Beijing in 1979, and he later went into business before dying in Ruili, Yunnan, on 11 April 2017. Dong Lianghui wrote a memoir about her father. Dong's eldest grandson, Dong Shaoren, compiled Dong Biwu's Family Letters, a collection of 68 of his grandfather's letters to his wife, children, nephews and others, which was published in 2016.

== Legacy ==
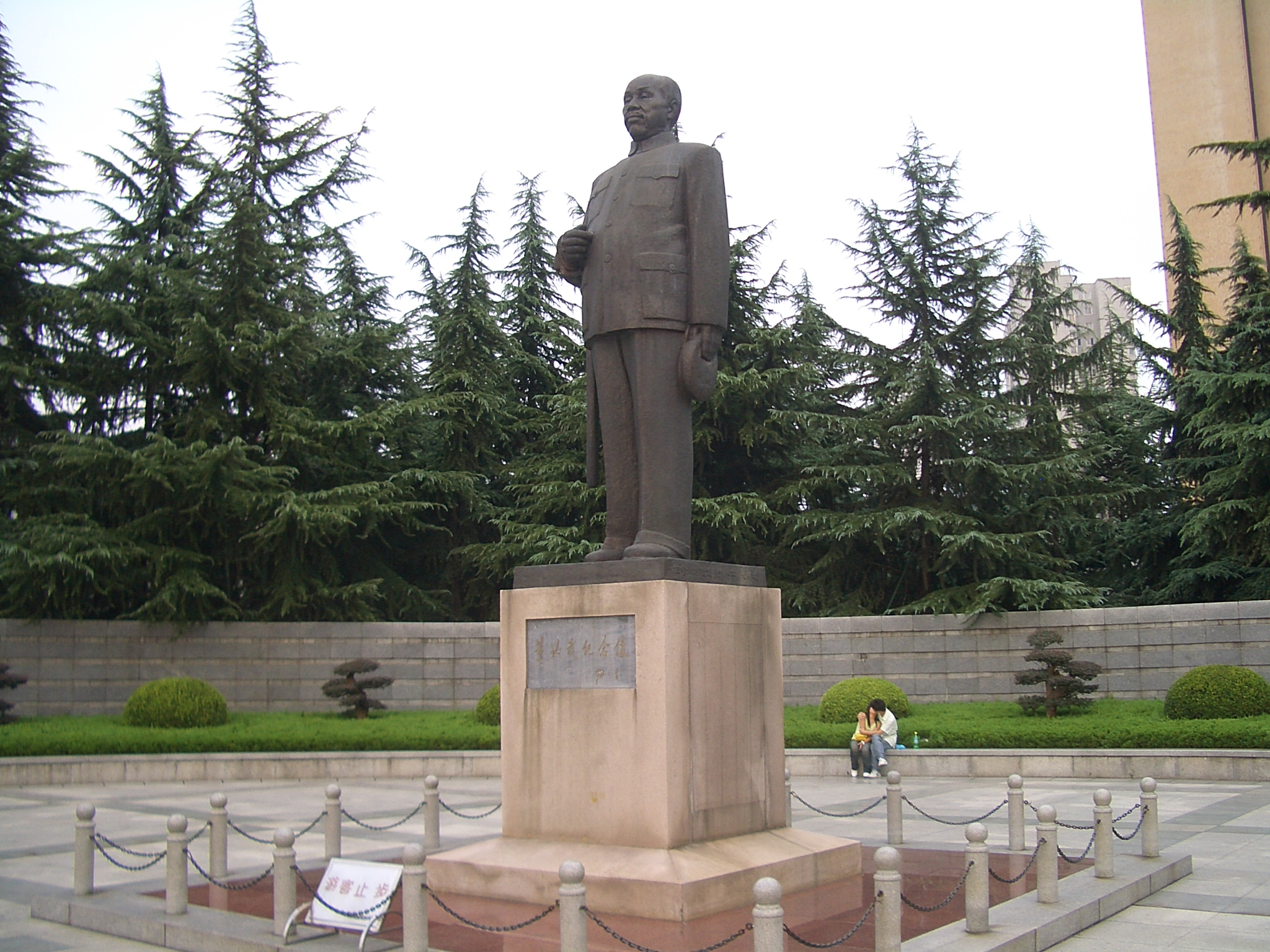
Statue of Dong Biwu in Wuhan

Dong was a prolific writer of classical poetry, and he wrote nearly 800 sets of poems, about 1,300 poems in all, over his lifetime. Chinese official accounts emphasize his frugality and his refusal to use his position to help relatives obtain jobs, school places or scarce goods. He described himself as a "servant of the people", and he wrote to relatives and friends that state employees had no privileges beyond the powers granted to them by law. The Hubei Provincial Museum's exhibition on prominent Hubei figures of the past century includes a design for the first series of renminbi banknotes that was in his collection, and it notes that Dong inscribed the name of the issuing bank.

== Bibliography ==
- Saich, Tony (2020). Finding Allies and Making Revolution: The Early Years of the Chinese Communist Party. Boston: Brill.

Party political offices
Preceded by Li Weihan	President of the CCP Central Party School; 1935–1937	Succeeded by Li Weihan
Legal offices
Preceded by Shen Junru	President of the Supreme People's Court; 1954–1959	Succeeded by Xie Juezai
Political offices
Preceded by Zhu De	Vice Chairman of the People's Republic of China; 1959–1975; Served alongside: Soong Ching-ling	Succeeded by Ulanhu; Abolished until 1983
Preceded by Liu Shaoqi	Chairman of the People's Republic of China; Acting; 1972–1975	Succeeded by Li Xiannian; Abolished until 1983
