= Politics of Zhejiang =

Politics of a province of China

- National Emblem of China
- Legislature: Zhejiang Provincial People's Congress
- Website: www.zj.gov.cn

Communist Party
- Party: Zhejiang Provincial Committee of the Chinese Communist Party
- Secretary: Wang Hao

Government
- Executive: Provincial People's Government
- Governor: Liu Jie
- Executive Vice Governor: Xu Wenguang
- Congress Chairperson: Wang Hao
- Provincial CPPCC Chairman: Lian Yimin
- Commission for Discipline Inspection Secretary: Fu Mingxian
- Supervisory Director: Fu Mingxian
- Court President: Li Zhanguo
- Procurator General: Lin Yiying
- Military: Zhejiang Military District
- Commander: Xin Keli

The politics of Zhejiang is structured in a dual party-government system like all other governing institutions in mainland China.

The Governor of Zhejiang is the highest-ranking official in the People's Government of Zhejiang. However, in the province's dual party-government governing system, the Governor has less power than the Zhejiang Chinese Communist Party (CCP) Provincial Committee Secretary, colloquially termed the "Zhejiang CCP Party Chief".

== Provincial-level leaders ==
=== CCP Committee Secretaries ===
No.	Image	Name	Term start	Term end	Ref.
1		Tan Zhenlin	6 May 1949	September 1952	
2		Tan Qilong	September 1952	August 1954	
3		Jiang Hua	August 1954	January 1967	
4		Nan Ping	March 1968	May 1973	
5		Tan Qilong	May 1973	February 1977	
6		Tie Ying	February 1977	March 1983	
7		Wang Fang	March 1983	March 1987	
8		Xue Ju	March 1987	December 1988	
9		Li Zemin	December 1988	September 1998	
10		Zhang Dejiang	16 September 1998	24 December 2002	
11		Xi Jinping	24 December 2002	25 March 2007	
12		Zhao Hongzhu	25 March 2007	21 November 2012	
13		Xia Baolong	18 December 2012	26 April 2017	
14		Che Jun	26 April 2017	31 August 2020	
15		Yuan Jiajun	31 August 2020	7 December 2022	
16		Yi Lianhong	7 December 2022	28 October 2024	
17		Wang Hao	28 October 2024	Incumbent	

=== Governors of Zhejiang ===
No.	Name (Birth–Death)	Term of office		Political party
No.	Name (Birth–Death)	Took office	Left office	Political party
Governor of the Zhejiang Provincial People's Government
1	Tan Zhenlin (1902–1983)	August 1949	January 1955	Chinese Communist Party
Governor of the Zhejiang Provincial People's Committee
2	Sha Wenhan (1908–1964)	January 1955	November 1957	Chinese Communist Party
2	Huo Shilian (1909–1996)	November 1957	January 1958	Chinese Communist Party
3	Zhou Jianren (1888–1984)	January 1958	January 1967	Chinese Communist Party
Director of the Zhejiang Provincial Military Control Committee of the People's Liberation Army
4	Long Qian (1913–1992)	January 1967	August 1967	Chinese Communist Party
5	Nan Ping (1918–1989)	August 1967	March 1968	Chinese Communist Party
Director of the Zhejiang Revolutionary Committee
(5)	Nan Ping (1918–1989)	March 1968	May 1973	Chinese Communist Party
6	Tan Qilong (1913–2003)	May 1973	February 1977	Chinese Communist Party
7	Tie Ying (1916–2009)	February 1977	December 1979	Chinese Communist Party
Governor of the Zhejiang Provincial People's Government
8	Li Fengping (1912–2008)	December 1979	April 1983	Chinese Communist Party
9	Xue Ju (1922–2024)	April 1983	January 1988	Chinese Communist Party
10	Shen Zulun (1931–2023)	February 1988	January 1988	Chinese Communist Party
11	Ge Hongsheng (1931–2020)	November 1990	March 1991	Chinese Communist Party
12	Wan Xueyuan (born 1941)	March 1991	April 1997	Chinese Communist Party
13	Chai Songyue (born 1941)	April 1997	October 2002	Chinese Communist Party
14	Xi Jinping (born 1953)	October 2002	January 2003	Chinese Communist Party
15	Lü Zushan (born 1946)	January 2003	August 2011	Chinese Communist Party
16	Xia Baolong (born 1952)	16 January 2012	21 December 2012	Chinese Communist Party
17	Li Qiang (born 1959)	21 December 2012	4 July 2016	Chinese Communist Party
18	Che Jun (born 1955)	4 July 2016	28 April 2017	Chinese Communist Party
19	Yuan Jiajun (born 1962)	28 April 2017	4 September 2020	Chinese Communist Party
20	Zheng Shanjie (born 1961)	4 September 2020	30 September 2021	Chinese Communist Party
21	Wang Hao (born 1963)	30 September 2021	18 December 2024	Chinese Communist Party
21	Liu Jie (born 1970)	18 December 2024	Incumbent	Chinese Communist Party

=== Directors of the Zhejiang Provincial People's Congress ===
Name	Took office	Left office
Tie Ying	December 1979	January 1988
Chen Anyu	January 1988	January 1993
Li Zemin	January 1993	January 2003
Xi Jinping	January 2003	May 2007
Yu Guoxing (acting)	May 2007	January 2008
Zhao Hongzhu	January 2008	January 2013
Xia Baolong	January 2013	April 2017
Che Jun	April 2017	September 2020
Yuan Jiajun	29 September 2020	December 2022
Yi Lianhong	January 2023	November 2024
Wang Hao	January 2025	Incumbent

=== Chairperson of CPPCC Zhejiang Committee ===
Chairman of Zhejiang Provincial Committee of the Chinese People's Political Consultative Conference
- Incumbent; Lian Yimin since January 2024
- Status: Local CPPCC leader
- Term length: Five years, renewable

=== 1st ===
- Term: February 1955 – November 1958
- Chairperson: Jiang Hua
- Vice Chairpersons: Yang Siyi, He Xiehou, Lin Feng, Song Yunbin, Tang Yuanbing, Yu Jiyi

=== 2nd ===
- Term: November 1958 – September 1964
- Chairperson: Jiang Hua
- Vice Chairpersons: Li Fengping, He Xiehou, Lin Feng, Tang Yuanbing, Yu Jiyi, Xu Chiwen, Wu Huawen, Chen Weida, Wang Jin, Wu Shanmin

=== 3rd ===
- Term: September 1964 – December 1977
- Chairperson: Jiang Hua
- Vice Chairpersons: Chen Weida, Mao Qihua, Tang Yuanbing, Yu Jiyi, Wang Jin, Wu Shanmin, Tang Xunze

=== 4th ===
- Term: December 1977 – April 1983
- Chairperson: Tie Ying → Mao Qihua (December 1979–)
- Vice Chairpersons: Chen Weida, Chen Bing, Mao Qihua, Wu Xian, He Kexi, Tang Yuanbing, Yu Jiyi, Lin Huishan, Chen Li, Cai Bao, Li Lanyan, Wu Youxin, Wang Jiwu, Zhou Qingxiang, Yang Haibo, Chen Lijie, Jiang Ximing, Cui Dongbo, Xue Ju (December 1979–), Zhang Renzhi (December 1979–), Peng Ruilin (December 1979–), He Zhibin (December 1979–), Zhu Zhiguang (May 1981–), Zhou Chunhui (May 1981–), Feng Tiyun (May 1981–)

=== 5th ===
- Term: April 1983 – January 1988
- Chairperson: Wang Jiayang
- Vice Chairpersons: Tang Yuanbing, Zhang Renzhi, Cai Bao, Wu Youxin, Zhu Zhiguang, Chen Lijie, Jiang Ximing, Sun Zhanglu, He Zhibin, Zhou Chunhui, Feng Tiyun, Jiang Cisheng, Qiu Qinghua, Cao Xuanling, Zhan Shaowen, Wang Chengxu, Ding Deyun, Li Dexin (May 1987–), Su Jilan (May 1987–)

=== 6th ===
- Term: January 1988 – January 1993
- Chairperson: Shang Jingcai
- Vice Chairpersons: Tang Yuanbing, Li Dexin, Wu Youxin, He Zhibin, Zhou Chunhui, Jiang Cisheng, Qiu Qinghua, Zhan Shaowen, Wang Chengxu, Ding Deyun, Li Chaolong, Su Jilan, Xue Yanzhuang

=== 7th ===
- Term: January 1993 – January 1998
- Chairperson: Liu Feng
- Vice Chairpersons: Sun Jiaxian, Wang Xixuan, Chen Fawen, Wu Renyuan, Zhan Shaowen, Ding Deyun, Su Jilan, Xue Yanzhuang, Que Duanlin, Geng Dianhua, Zhang Kejian, Tang Yuanbing

=== 8th ===
- Term: January 1998 – January 2003
- Chairperson: Liu Feng
- Vice Chairpersons: Long Anding, Geng Dianhua, Ding Deyun, Chen Wenshao, Que Duanlin, Li Qing, Wang Xixuan, Cheng Wei, Wang Wudi, Chen Zhaodian

=== 9th ===
- Term: January 2003 – January 2008
- Chairperson: Li Jinming
- Vice Chairpersons: Long Anding, Li Qing, Chen Zhaodian, Zhang Weiwen, Wang Yudi, Wu Guohua, Xu Hongdao, Peng Tuzhi, Feng Peien, Xu Guanju

=== 10th ===
- Term: January 2008 – January 2013
- Chairperson: Zhou Guofu
- Vice Chairpersons: Lou Yangsheng, Sheng Changli, Xu Guanju, Wang Yongchang, Chen Yanhua, Huang Xuming, Xu Hui, Yao Ke, Feng Mingguang
- Secretary-General: Huang Xuming (concurrently)

=== 11th ===
- Term: January 2013 – January 2018
- Chairperson: Qiao Chuanxiu
- Vice Chairpersons: Chen Jiayuan, Chen Yanhua, Yao Ke, Tang Lulu, Zhang Hongming, Zhang Zexi, Chen Xiaoping, Wu Jing, Cai Xiujun
- Secretary-General: Sun Wenyou

=== 12th ===
- Term: January 2018 – January 2023
- Chairperson: Ge Huijun (– January 2022) → Huang Lixin (January 2022–)
- Vice Chairpersons: Sun Jingsong, Zheng Jiwei, Zhang Zexi, Chen Xiaoping, Wu Jing, Cai Xiujun, Chen Tiexiong, Ma Guangming, Zhou Guohui, Wang Changrong, Qiu Dongyao
- Secretary-General: Jin Changzheng

=== 13th ===
- Term: January 2023 –
- Chairperson: Huang Lixin (– January 9, 2024) → Lian Yimin (January 25, 2024–)
- Vice Chairpersons: Wang Changrong, Zhu Congjiu, Chen Xiaoping, Cai Xiujun, Cheng Yuechong, Chen Qingcang, Zhang Xuewei, Ye Zhengbo, Yin Xuequn
- Secretary-General: Chen Dongling

== See also ==
- New Zhijiang Army
