= Governor of Zhejiang =

Chinese provincial official

Governor of the Zhejiang Provincial People's Government
- 浙江省人民政府省长
- National Emblem of China

- Flag of China

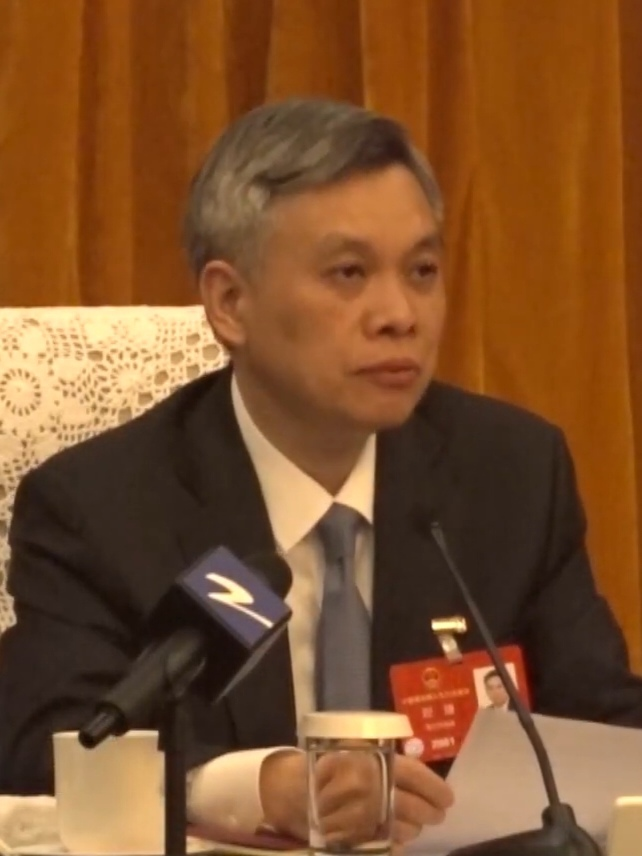
- Incumbent; Liu Jie since 18 December 2024
- Zhejiang Provincial People's Government
- Type: Governor
- Status: Provincial and ministerial-level official
- Reports to: Zhejiang Provincial People's Congress and its Standing Committee
- Nominator: Presidium of the Zhejiang Provincial People's Congress
- Appointer: Zhejiang Provincial People's Congress
- Term length: Five years, renewable
- Inaugural holder: Tan Zhenlin
- Formation: August 1949
- Deputy: Deputy Governors; Secretary-General

The governor of Zhejiang, officially the Governor of the Zhejiang Provincial People's Government, is the head of Zhejiang Province and leader of the Zhejiang Provincial People's Government.

The governor is elected by the Zhejiang Provincial People's Congress, and responsible to it and its Standing Committee. The governor is a provincial level official and is responsible for the overall decision-making of the provincial government. The governor is assisted by an executive vice governor as well as several vice governors. The governor generally serves as the deputy secretary of the Zhejiang Provincial Committee of the Chinese Communist Party and as a member of the CCP Central Committee. The governor is the second highest-ranking official in the province after the secretary of the CCP Zhejiang Committee. The current governor is Liu Jie, who took office on 18 December 2024.

== Leader offices ==
Title	Existence
Governor of the Zhejiang Provincial People's Government	1949–1955
Governor of the Zhejiang Provincial People's Committee	1955–1967
Director of the Committee for the People's Liberation Army Control of Zhejiang Province	1967–1968
Director of the Zhejiang Provincial Revolutionary Committee	1968–1979
Governor of the Zhejiang Provincial People's Government	1979–present

== List of governors ==
=== Republic of China ===
Non-partisan/ unknown Unity Party Republican Party Military/ Warlords Kuomintang/ National Revolutionary Army

==== Military governors ====
No.	Portrait	Name (Birth–Death)	Term of office		Political party
1		Tang Shouqian 湯壽潛 (1856–1917)	4 November 1911 (nominated on 4 November 1911)	1 January 1912	
1		Tang Shouqian 湯壽潛 (1856–1917)	Served as provincial military governor (dudu 都督)		
2		Jiang Zungui 蔣尊簋 (1882–1931)	12 July 1912 (nominated on 16 January 1912)	23 July 1912	Unity Party
2		Jiang Zungui 蔣尊簋 (1882–1931)	Also served as head of the civil government during his tenure as military governor.		
3		Zhu Rui 朱瑞 (1883–1916)	23 July 1912	11 April 1916	Republican Party
3		Zhu Rui 朱瑞 (1883–1916)	Served as provincial general (jiangjun 將軍) from 30 June 1914; also served as head of the civil government 23 July 1912 – 10 September 1913. Eventually fled the province.		
4		Qu Yingguang 屈映光 (1881–1973)	14 April 1916 (nominated on 12 April 1916)	5 May 1916	
4		Qu Yingguang 屈映光 (1881–1973)	Acting military governor. Also served as de facto head of the civil government from 10 September 1913 to 6 July 1916, and as "pacification commissioner" (xun'anshi 巡按使) from 25 May 1914		
5		Lü Gongwang 呂公望 (1879–1954)	6 July 1916 (nominated on 5 May 1916)	1 January 1917	
5		Lü Gongwang 呂公望 (1879–1954)	Also served as de facto head of the civil government, namely "provincial head" (shengzhang 省長) during his tenure.		
6		Yang Shande 楊善德 (1873–1919)	1 January 1917	13 August 1919	Anhui clique
6		Yang Shande 楊善德 (1873–1919)	Died in office.		
7		Lu Yongxiang 盧永祥 Lú Yǒngxiáng (1867–1933)	14 August 1919	20 September 1924	Anhui clique
7		Lu Yongxiang 盧永祥 Lú Yǒngxiáng (1867–1933)	Served as "provincial superintendent" (duban 督辦) from 20 June 1922.		
8		Sun Chuanfang 孫傳芳 Sūn Chuánfāng (1885–1935)	20 September 1924	19 December 1926	Zhili clique
8		Sun Chuanfang 孫傳芳 Sūn Chuánfāng (1885–1935)	Sun initially served as "provincial supervisor" (duli 督理), and as "provincial superintendent" (duban 督辦) from 16 January 1925. He mostly ruled through subordinates, most notably appointing Lu Xiangting as "military commander-in-chief" (de facto military governor) in January 1926.		
(9)		Lu Xiangting	25 January 1926	?	Zhili clique
(9)		Lu Xiangting	Served as "military commander-in-chief" of the province.		
10		Jiang Zungui	19 December 1926	29 December 1926	Zhili clique
11		Meng Zhaoyue	29 December 1926	17 February 1927	Zhili clique

==== Civil governors ====
No.	Portrait	Name (Birth–Death)	Term of office		Political party
1		Lü Gongwang 呂公望 (1879–1954)	1916	January 1917	
2		Qi Yaoshan 齊耀珊 (1865–1954)	January 1917	24 June 1920	
3		Shen Jinjian 沈金鑒 (1875–1924)	24 June 1920	29 October 1922	
4		Zhang Zaiyang 張載揚 (1874–1945)	29 October 1922	?	
5		Xia Chao 夏超 (1882–1926)	1924	23 October 1926	Zhili clique
		Xia Chao 夏超 (1882–1926)	1924	23 October 1926	NRA
6		Chen Yi 陳儀 Chén Yí (1883–1950)	October 1925	July 1927	Zhili clique
		Chen Yi 陳儀 Chén Yí (1883–1950)	October 1925	July 1927	NRA

==== Chairperson of the Provincial Government ====
No.	Portrait	Name (Birth–Death)	Term of office		Political party
1		Zhang Renjie 張靜江 (1877–1950)	27 July 1927	5 October 1927	Kuomintang
2		He Yingqin 何應欽 Hé Yìngqīn (1890–1987)	5 October 1927	7 November 1928	Kuomintang
(1)		Zhang Renjie 張靜江 (1877–1950)	7 November 1928	4 December 1930	Kuomintang
3		Zhang Nanxian 張難先 (1873–1968)	4 December 1930	15 December 1931	Kuomintang
4		Lu Diping 魯滌平 (1887–1935)	15 December 1931	12 December 1934	Kuomintang
5		Huang Shaohong 黃紹竑 (1895–1966)	12 December 1934	25 July 1936	Kuomintang
6		Bai Chongxi 白崇禧 (1893–1966)	25 July 1936	6 September 1936	Kuomintang
6		Bai Chongxi 白崇禧 (1893–1966)	Refused to take office; Director of Civil Affairs Department Xu Qingfu acted as chairperson.		
(5)		Huang Shaohong 黃紹竑 (1895–1966)	6 September 1936	2 December 1936	Kuomintang
7		Zhu Jiahua 朱家驊 Zhū Jiāhuá (1893–1963)	12 December 1934	26 November 1937	Kuomintang
(5)		Huang Shaohong 黃紹竑 (1895–1966)	26 November 1937	26 March 1946	Kuomintang
8		Shen Honglie 沈鴻烈 (1882–1969)	26 March 1946	22 June 1948	Kuomintang
9		Chen Yi 陳儀 Chén Yí (1883–1950)	22 June 1948	21 February 1949	Kuomintang
10		Zhou Yan 周喦 (1895–1953)	21 February 1949	6 December 1949	Kuomintang
11		Shi Jue 石覺 (1908–1986)	7 December 1949	13 May 1950	Kuomintang
12		Hu Zongnan 胡宗南 (1896–1962)	19 October 1950	23 July 1953	Kuomintang
12		Hu Zongnan 胡宗南 (1896–1962)	Evacuated to Taiwan 23 July 1953.		

=== People's Republic of China ===
No.	Name (Birth–Death)	Term of office		Political party
No.	Name (Birth–Death)	Took office	Left office	Political party
Governor of the Zhejiang Provincial People's Government
1	Tan Zhenlin (1902–1983)	August 1949	January 1955	Chinese Communist Party
Governor of the Zhejiang Provincial People's Committee
2	Sha Wenhan (1908–1964)	January 1955	November 1957	Chinese Communist Party
2	Huo Shilian (1909–1996)	November 1957	January 1958	Chinese Communist Party
3	Zhou Jianren (1888–1984)	January 1958	January 1967	Chinese Communist Party
Director of the Zhejiang Provincial Military Control Committee of the People's Liberation Army
4	Long Qian (1913–1992)	January 1967	August 1967	Chinese Communist Party
5	Nan Ping (1918–1989)	August 1967	March 1968	Chinese Communist Party
Director of the Zhejiang Revolutionary Committee
(5)	Nan Ping (1918–1989)	March 1968	May 1973	Chinese Communist Party
6	Tan Qilong (1913–2003)	May 1973	February 1977	Chinese Communist Party
7	Tie Ying (1916–2009)	February 1977	December 1979	Chinese Communist Party
Governor of the Zhejiang Provincial People's Government
8	Li Fengping (1912–2008)	December 1979	April 1983	Chinese Communist Party
9	Xue Ju (1922–2024)	April 1983	January 1988	Chinese Communist Party
10	Shen Zulun (1931–2023)	February 1988	January 1988	Chinese Communist Party
11	Ge Hongsheng (1931–2020)	November 1990	March 1991	Chinese Communist Party
12	Wan Xueyuan (born 1941)	March 1991	April 1997	Chinese Communist Party
13	Chai Songyue (born 1941)	April 1997	October 2002	Chinese Communist Party
14	Xi Jinping (born 1953)	October 2002	January 2003	Chinese Communist Party
15	Lü Zushan (born 1946)	January 2003	August 2011	Chinese Communist Party
16	Xia Baolong (born 1952)	16 January 2012	21 December 2012	Chinese Communist Party
17	Li Qiang (born 1959)	21 December 2012	4 July 2016	Chinese Communist Party
18	Che Jun (born 1955)	4 July 2016	28 April 2017	Chinese Communist Party
19	Yuan Jiajun (born 1962)	28 April 2017	4 September 2020	Chinese Communist Party
20	Zheng Shanjie (born 1961)	4 September 2020	30 September 2021	Chinese Communist Party
21	Wang Hao (born 1963)	30 September 2021	18 December 2024	Chinese Communist Party
21	Liu Jie (born 1970)	18 December 2024	Incumbent	Chinese Communist Party

== Sources ==
- Jordan, Donald A. (1976). "Provincialism within the Chinese National Revolution: The Case of Chekiang, 1926–1927". In F. Gilbert Chan; Thomas H. Etzold (eds.). China in the 1920s. Nationalism and Revolution. New York City, London: Franklin Watts. ISBN 0-531-05383-0.
