= Zhejiang Provincial Committee of the Chinese People's Political Consultative Conference =

Provincial advisory body

Zhejiang Provincial Committee of the Chinese People's Political Consultative Conference 中国人民政治协商会议浙江省委员会
- 13th
- Emblem of the Chinese People's Political Consultative Conference

Type
- Type: United front organ Constitutional convention (Historical); Legislature (Historical) of Chinese People's Political Consultative Conference

History
- Founded: February 1955; 71 years ago
- Preceded by: ZhejiangProvincial People's Congress Consultative Committee

Leadership
- Chairperson: Lian Yimin

Website
- www.zjzx.gov.cn

Chinese name
- Simplified Chinese: 中国人民政治协商会议浙江省委员会
- Traditional Chinese: 中國人民政治協商會議浙江省委員會
Transcriptions
Standard Mandarin
- Hanyu Pinyin: Zhōngguó Rénmín Zhèngzhì Xiéshāng Huìyì Zhèjiāngshěng Wěiyuánhuì

Abbreviation
- Simplified Chinese: 浙江省政协
- Traditional Chinese: 浙江省政協
- Literal meaning: CPPCC ZhejiangProvincial Committee
Transcriptions
Standard Mandarin
- Hanyu Pinyin: Zhèjiāngshěng Zhèngxié

The Zhejiang Provincial Committee of the Chinese People's Political Consultative Conference (Chinese: 中国人民政治协商会议浙江省委员会) is the advisory body and a local organization of the Chinese People's Political Consultative Conference in Zhejiang, China. It is supervised and directed by the Zhejiang Provincial Committee of the Chinese Communist Party.

== History ==
The Zhejiang Provincial Committee of the Chinese People's Political Consultative Conference traces its origins to the Zhejiang Provincial People's Congress Consultative Committee (浙江省各界人民代表会议协商委员会), founded in 1949.

=== Anti-corruption campaign ===
On 4 May 2023, vice chairperson Zhu Congjiu was suspected of "serious violations of laws and regulations" by the Central Commission for Discipline Inspection (CCDI), the party's internal disciplinary body, and the National Supervisory Commission, the highest anti-corruption agency of China. On 9 November 2024, Zhu was sentenced to life imprisonment, deprived of political rights for life, and had all his personal property confiscated.

== Term ==
=== 1st ===
- Term: February 1955 – November 1958
- Chairperson: Jiang Hua
- Vice Chairpersons: Yang Siyi, He Xiehou, Lin Feng, Song Yunbin, Tang Yuanbing, Yu Jiyi

=== 2nd ===
- Term: November 1958 – September 1964
- Chairperson: Jiang Hua
- Vice Chairpersons: Li Fengping, He Xiehou, Lin Feng, Tang Yuanbing, Yu Jiyi, Xu Chiwen, Wu Huawen, Chen Weida, Wang Jin, Wu Shanmin

=== 3rd ===
- Term: September 1964 – December 1977
- Chairperson: Jiang Hua
- Vice Chairpersons: Chen Weida, Mao Qihua, Tang Yuanbing, Yu Jiyi, Wang Jin, Wu Shanmin, Tang Xunze

=== 4th ===
- Term: December 1977 – April 1983
- Chairperson: Tie Ying → Mao Qihua (December 1979–)
- Vice Chairpersons: Chen Weida, Chen Bing, Mao Qihua, Wu Xian, He Kexi, Tang Yuanbing, Yu Jiyi, Lin Huishan, Chen Li, Cai Bao, Li Lanyan, Wu Youxin, Wang Jiwu, Zhou Qingxiang, Yang Haibo, Chen Lijie, Jiang Ximing, Cui Dongbo, Xue Ju (December 1979–), Zhang Renzhi (December 1979–), Peng Ruilin (December 1979–), He Zhibin (December 1979–), Zhu Zhiguang (May 1981–), Zhou Chunhui (May 1981–), Feng Tiyun (May 1981–)

=== 5th ===
- Term: April 1983 – January 1988
- Chairperson: Wang Jiayang
- Vice Chairpersons: Tang Yuanbing, Zhang Renzhi, Cai Bao, Wu Youxin, Zhu Zhiguang, Chen Lijie, Jiang Ximing, Sun Zhanglu, He Zhibin, Zhou Chunhui, Feng Tiyun, Jiang Cisheng, Qiu Qinghua, Cao Xuanling, Zhan Shaowen, Wang Chengxu, Ding Deyun, Li Dexin (May 1987–), Su Jilan (May 1987–)

=== 6th ===
- Term: January 1988 – January 1993
- Chairperson: Shang Jingcai
- Vice Chairpersons: Tang Yuanbing, Li Dexin, Wu Youxin, He Zhibin, Zhou Chunhui, Jiang Cisheng, Qiu Qinghua, Zhan Shaowen, Wang Chengxu, Ding Deyun, Li Chaolong, Su Jilan, Xue Yanzhuang

=== 7th ===
- Term: January 1993 – January 1998
- Chairperson: Liu Feng
- Vice Chairpersons: Sun Jiaxian, Wang Xixuan, Chen Fawen, Wu Renyuan, Zhan Shaowen, Ding Deyun, Su Jilan, Xue Yanzhuang, Que Duanlin, Geng Dianhua, Zhang Kejian, Tang Yuanbing

=== 8th ===
- Term: January 1998 – January 2003
- Chairperson: Liu Feng
- Vice Chairpersons: Long Anding, Geng Dianhua, Ding Deyun, Chen Wenshao, Que Duanlin, Li Qing, Wang Xixuan, Cheng Wei, Wang Wudi, Chen Zhaodian

=== 9th ===
- Term: January 2003 – January 2008
- Chairperson: Li Jinming
- Vice Chairpersons: Long Anding, Li Qing, Chen Zhaodian, Zhang Weiwen, Wang Yudi, Wu Guohua, Xu Hongdao, Peng Tuzhi, Feng Peien, Xu Guanju

=== 10th ===
- Term: January 2008 – January 2013
- Chairperson: Zhou Guofu
- Vice Chairpersons: Lou Yangsheng, Sheng Changli, Xu Guanju, Wang Yongchang, Chen Yanhua, Huang Xuming, Xu Hui, Yao Ke, Feng Mingguang
- Secretary-General: Huang Xuming (concurrently)

=== 11th ===
- Term: January 2013 – January 2018
- Chairperson: Qiao Chuanxiu
- Vice Chairpersons: Chen Jiayuan, Chen Yanhua, Yao Ke, Tang Lulu, Zhang Hongming, Zhang Zexi, Chen Xiaoping, Wu Jing, Cai Xiujun
- Secretary-General: Sun Wenyou

=== 12th ===
- Term: January 2018 – January 2023
- Chairperson: Ge Huijun (– January 2022) → Huang Lixin (January 2022–)
- Vice Chairpersons: Sun Jingsong, Zheng Jiwei, Zhang Zexi, Chen Xiaoping, Wu Jing, Cai Xiujun, Chen Tiexiong, Ma Guangming, Zhou Guohui, Wang Changrong, Qiu Dongyao
- Secretary-General: Jin Changzheng

=== 13th ===
- Term: January 2023 –
- Chairperson: Huang Lixin (– January 9, 2024) → Lian Yimin (January 25, 2024–)
- Vice Chairpersons: Wang Changrong, Zhu Congjiu, Chen Xiaoping, Cai Xiujun, Cheng Yuechong, Chen Qingcang, Zhang Xuewei, Ye Zhengbo, Yin Xuequn
- Secretary-General: Chen Dongling
