= Gao Xingfu =

Chinese politician

- 高兴夫

Vice Chairperson of the Zhejiang Provincial People's Congress
- In office January 2023 – August 2025
- Chairperson: Yi Lianhong; Wang Hao

Vice Governor of Zhejiang
- In office August 2016 – January 2023
- Governor: Che Jun; Yuan Jiajun; Zheng Shanjie; Wang Hao

Personal details
- Born: August 1963 (age 63) Hangzhou, Zhejiang, China
- Party: Chinese Communist Party (1986-2026, expelled)
- Education: Tianjin University

Chinese name
- Simplified Chinese: 高兴夫
- Traditional Chinese: 高興夫
Transcriptions
Standard Mandarin
- Hanyu Pinyin: Gāo Xìngfū

Gao Xingfu (Chinese: 高兴夫; born August 1963) is a former Chinese executive and politician. As of August 2025 he was under investigation by China's top anti-graft watchdog. Previously he served as vice chairperson of the Zhejiang Provincial People's Congress and before that, vice governor of Zhejiang.

== Early life and education ==
Gao was born in Hangzhou, Zhejiang, in August 1963. In 1981, he enrolled at Tianjin University, where he majored in port and waterway engineering.

== Career ==
Gao joined the Chinese Communist Party (CCP) in May 1986.

After university in March 1988, Gao was assigned to Zhejiang Provincial Construction Engineering Corporation (now Zhejiang Construction Engineering Group) as deputy manager of the Operations Department of its General Contracting Company. Thereafter, he successively served as deputy manager and then manager of External Operations Department (Zhejiang Zhongjian Engineering Company), manager of the Overseas Department, assistant to the general manager, deputy general manager, general manager. He moved up the ranks to become vice chairman in March 2009 and chairman in May 2013.

In January 2015, Gao took office as chairman and party secretary of Zhejiang Provincial Transportation Investment Group.

Gao got involved in politics in August 2016, when he was appointed vice governor of Zhejiang, and served until January 2023, when he was chosen as vice chairperson of the Zhejiang Provincial People's Congress.

== Downfall ==
On 18 August 2025, Gao was suspected of "serious violations of laws and regulations" by the Central Commission for Discipline Inspection (CCDI), the party's internal disciplinary body, and the National Supervisory Commission, the highest anti-corruption agency of China. Gao was expelled from the party and dismissed from the public post on 6 February 2026.
