= Lü Gongwang =

Lü Gongwang (1879 – July 22, 1954), originally named Zhan'ao, courtesy name Daizhi, was a military general and industrialist of Taiwan. He was a native of Yongkang County, Jinhua Prefecture, Zhejiang Province.

== Biography ==
In 1899 (the 25th year of the Guangxu Emperor's reign), Lü Gongwang passed the imperial examination at the xiucai (licentiate) level. In 1901 (Guangxu 27), he became a stipend student (linsheng). In 1906 (Guangxu 32), he met Qiu Jin and joined the Guangfuhui (Restoration Society). In December of the same year, he began engaging in military affairs in Zhejiang Province.

In 1907 (Guangxu 33), he enrolled in the accelerated training program at the Baoding Military Academy. After graduating, he returned to Zhejiang.

In December 1909 (1st year of the Xuantong Emperor’s reign), he went to Guangxi Province and took a position in the Military Equipment Office. However, due to his collaboration with Yin Changheng in publishing a revolutionary magazine, he was held accountable by the authorities and fled to Hong Kong. In October 1910 (Xuantong 2), he returned to Zhejiang and resumed his military duties.

After the outbreak of the Wuchang Uprising in October 1911 (Xuantong 3), Lü participated in revolutionary activities in Zhejiang and served as Chief of Staff of the Shanghai Assault Detachment led by Zhu Rui. In January 1912 (the 1st year of the Republic of China), he was appointed commander of the 11th Division of the Zhejiang Army. After a military reorganization, he became commander of the 6th Division. In 1913 (Republic Year 2), he served as the Martial Law Commander of Jiaxing and Huzhou, and in 1914 (Republic Year 3), he became the Garrison Commander of Jiaxing and Huzhou.

On December 23, 1915 (the 4th year of the Republic of China), Lü Gongwang was granted the title of First-Class Baron by Yuan Shikai. After the outbreak of the National Protection War in April 1916 (Republic Year 5), Lü, together with Tong Baoxuan and Wang Wenqing, launched an uprising to expel Zhu Rui, the ambiguous and hesitant military governor of Zhejiang. They declared Zhejiang’s independence and elected Qu Yingguang as the military governor (dujun).On May 5, Qu Yingguang resigned, and Lü was then nominated by various circles in Zhejiang to succeed him. He assumed office as the Military Governor of Zhejiang on May 6. After Yuan Shikai’s death, Li Yuanhong succeeded him as President. On July 6, Li appointed Lü as the Military Governor and Acting Civil Governor of Zhejiang. On December 26, a mutiny broke out among the military and police in Zhejiang. Lü submitted his resignation, which was officially accepted by the Beijing government on January 1, 1917 (Republic Year 6).

In July 1917, during Manchu Restoration to restore the Qing dynasty, Lü followed Duan Qirui in suppressing the movement. When the Constitutional Protection Movement began, Zhejiang’s military governor Yang Shande dispatched Tong Baoxuan and the Zhejiang Army to Fujian in support of Li Houji, resisting the Guangdong forces led by Chen Jiongming. In late August 1918 (Republic Year 7), Lü, along with Wang Wenqing, arrived in Fujian to rally former Zhejiang troops and pledged allegiance to the southern government.On September 1, the Guangzhou Military Government appointed Lü Gongwang as Commander-in-Chief of the Zhejiang Army supporting the campaign in Fujian. In 1920 (Republic Year 9), he was appointed Chief of Staff of the Military Government.

In May 1921 (the 10th year of the Republic of China), Lü Gongwang resigned from his position and moved to Tianjin. He later founded various businesses, though several ended in failure. In 1933, he was appointed chairman of the board of the China Women's Commercial and Savings Bank. In 1937 (the 26th year of the Republic), he was appointed by the Nationalist Government as a member of the Zhejiang Provincial Refugee Relief Association. He subsequently established the Zhejiang Provincial Refugee Dyeing and Weaving Company and served as its general manager. In 1946 (the 35th year of the Republic), he became vice chairman of the Zhejiang Provincial Consultative Council.

After the founding of the People's Republic of China, Lü Gongwang remained on the mainland. He held several positions, including member of the Hangzhou Committee for Supporting the Army, member of the Hangzhou Public Bond Promotion Committee, vice chairman of the Hangzhou Branch of the China National Relief Association, and member of the Zhejiang Provincial Committee of the Chinese People's Political Consultative Conference (CPPCC).

Lü Gongwang died in Hangzhou on July 22, 1954, at the age of 76.
