= Si Xinliang =

Chinese politician

Si Xinliang 斯鑫良

Vice Chairman of the Zhejiang Provincial People's Political Consultative Conference
- In office 2010 – February 2013
- Chairman: Zhou Guofu (周国富); Qiao Chuanxiu (乔传秀)

Head of the Organization Department of the Zhejiang Provincial Party Committee
- In office June 2001 – June 2010
- Party Secretary: Zhang Dejiang; Xi Jinping; Zhao Hongzhu
- Preceded by: Shen Yueyue
- Succeeded by: Cai Qi

Head of the Publicity Department of the Zhejiang Provincial Party Committee
- In office April 2001 – June 2001
- Party Secretary: Zhang Dejiang
- Preceded by: Li Congjun
- Succeeded by: Chen Min'er

Personal details
- Born: January 1950 (age 76) Dongyang, Zhejiang
- Party: Chinese Communist Party (expelled)
- Education: Central Party School
- Occupation: Politician

Si Xinliang (Chinese: 斯鑫良; pinyin: Sī Xīnliáng; born January 1950) is a former Chinese politician. From 2010 to 2013, Si served as the Vice Chairman of the Zhejiang Provincial People's Political Consultative Conference, a mostly ceremonial legislative consultation body. Prior to that, Si served as the chief of the Organization Department of the Zhejiang provincial Chinese Communist Party Committee. He worked for several years under Xi Jinping, who was serving as the CCP Committee Secretary of Zhejiang.

== Biography ==
Si was born and raised in Dongyang, Zhejiang province in January 1950. Si joined the Chinese Communist Party (CCP) in 1981. He has a degree from Zhejiang Agricultural University (later merged into Zhejiang University) in animal husbandry.

Si spent his entire career in Zhejiang province. He worked at a food processing company in his home county as a manager before entering politics, first as deputy county governor. He rose through the ranks and successively served as the CCP Committee Secretary of Pujiang County, the head of the Organization Department for the party organization in the city of Huzhou and later CCP Deputy Committee Secretary. He was then promoted to CCP Committee Secretary, then the provincial Publicity Department head.

Si served as chief of the provincial party Organization Department for nearly a decade, between 2001 and 2010, serving under three CCP committee secretaries, Zhang Dejiang, Xi Jinping, and Zhao Hongzhu.

In 2010, Si, having reached the mandatory retirement age of 60, was transferred from his Organization Department leadership position to take on the largely ceremonial role of Vice Chairman of the Zhejiang Provincial People's Political Consultative Conference. Si was detained for investigation in February 2015 by the Central Commission for Discipline Inspection. Si was notable for being the first provincial-ministerial level official to be detained from Zhejiang province since the 18th National Congress of the Chinese Communist Party, and also being the first official of his rank who once worked directly under Xi Jinping to be investigated.

Si Xinliang's son, Si Li (斯力), a provincial Communist Youth League official, was also detained.

On June 19, 2015, after investigation by the CCDI, Si was expelled from the CCP. He was accused of violating the Eight-point Regulation, "playing golf rounds paid for by others", aiding the promotion and business activities of associates and taking "massive bribes", and "committed adultery." He was also said to have conspired with his wife to hide "ill-gotten gains" after gaining knowledge of his investigation, and "interfered and obstructed" the investigation. Si was sentenced 13 years in prison for accepting bribes amounting to nearly 20 million yuan (around $2.9 million) by a court in Jiangxi province on December 13, 2016.
