= Zhejiang delegation to the National People's Congress =

Zhejiang Delegation to the National People's Congress
- 全国人民代表大会浙江省代表团
- Delegation for the National People's Congress
- Map showing the location of Zhejiang Province
- Electoral unit: Zhejiang Province
- Population: 64,567,588

Current Delegation
- Created: 1954
- Seats: 99
- Head of delegation: Yi Lianhong
- Provincial People's Congress: Zhejiang Provincial People's Congress

The Zhejiang delegation to the National People's Congress is a delegation composed of deputies representing Zhejiang Province within the National People's Congress (NPC), the highest organ of state power of the People's Republic of China. NPC deputies from the Zhejiang Province are officially elected by the Zhejiang Provincial People's Congress.

== List of deputies ==
Year	NPC sessions	Deputies	Number of deputies	Ref.
1954	1st	Wen Yun, Wang Guosong, Bao Dasan, Zhu Zhiguang, He Xiehou, Song Yunbin, Li Shihao, Shen Zijiu, Sha Wenhan, Zhou Jianren, Zhu Kezhen, Qiu Qinghua, Shao Lizi, Yu Pingbo, Yao Shunfu, Hong Shilu, Ni Feijun, Ma Xulun, Ma Yinchu, Zhang Xinghua, Zhang Qinqiu, Xu Baoju, Chen Jianzhen, Chen Shutong, Chen Shuangtian, Lu Shijia, Feng Xuefeng, Feng Binfu, Yang Siyi, Zhao Zhongyao, Liu Kaiqu, Qian Chongshu, Luo Xianggen, Yan Jingyao, Gu Gongxu: By-election on June 15, 1956: Ye Xichun; By-election on February 1, 1958: Wu Xian, Yu Zhongwu, Yu Zuochen, Xu Chiwen, Tang Xunze, Dong Yumao, Pan Tianshou, Huo Shilian	35	
1959	2nd	Wen Yun (female), Ye Xichun, Liu Kaiqu, Shen Zijiu (female), Shen Fengying (female), Wang Yousheng, Yan Jingyao, Lu Shijia (female), Lu Qiaosheng, Chen Yousheng, Chen Shutong, Bei Shizhang, Wu Xian, He Xiehou, Zhang Qinqiu (female), Shao Lizi, Zhu Kezhen, Zhou Jianren, Qiu Qinghua, Zhao Zhongyao, Yu Pingbo, Yu Zuochen, Tang Xunze, Ma Xulun, Ma Yinchu, Ni Feijun (female), Xu Chiwen, Xu Baoju, Feng Binfu, Yang Kuangbao, Dong Yumao, Pan Tianshou, Huo Shilian, Qian Chongshu, Gu Gongxu	35	
1964	3rd	Ding Zhenlin, Ding Shunnian, Fang Wenjun, Fang Lingru, Ji Ce, Wang Yiding, Wang Jiwu, Bei Shizhang, Feng Binfu, Li Yuhua, Ye Xichun, Liu Tianxiang, Liu Kaiqu, Zhu Yan, Ren Yili, Sun Yong, Shen Xuenian, Shen Yichun, Shen Zijiu, Wang Yousheng, Yan Jingyao, Li Shaoyuan, Li Peizeng, Wu Youxin, Wu Jiang, Wu Zhonglian, Wu Xian, Wu Gengmin, Qiu Shibang, Qiu Qinghua, Zhang Fangzuo, Zhang Yingjie, Zhang Qinqiu, Lu Shijia, Lu Xueshan, Lu Xingyuan, Chen Shuangtian, Chen Shixiang, Chen Yousheng, Chen Zhiwei, Chen Shutong, Chen Jian Gong, Shao Lizi, Shao Peizi, Fan Wenlan, Luo Dagang, Jin Shixuan, Zhu Kezhen, Zhou Qingxiang, Zhou Jian, Zhou Jianren, Zhao Zhongyao, Hu Yongcai, Hu Dehua, Yu Fengying, Yu Pingbo, Yu Zuochen, Hou Yujun, Gao Xiaoxia, Tang Xunze, Xia Zhixu, Gu Gongxu, Gu Chunlin, Gu Peiyi, Qian Zhengying, Qian Zu'en, Qian Chongshu, Ni Haoshan, Ni Feijun, Xu Qiashi, Tao Ruoju, Liang Chunfu, Zhang Tao, Cui Dongbo, Huang Jianying, Dong Yumao, Cheng Chunshu, Fu Binran, Liao Xilong, Pan Tianshou, Pan Guisui, Huo Shilian	30	
1975	4th	Wang Zida, Wang Zhicheng, Wang Huaxiang, Wang Jiwu, Wang Gendi, Wang Jufeng, Fang Jianwen, Ye Xiaofu, Feng Shuren, Zhu Shiyuan, Liu Hanbin, Liu Yaozeng, Liu Zhikun, Liu Ying, Liu Pinqi, Tang Jiaocheng, Xu Afu, Sun Meiying, Du Laiyun, Li Yuelian, Li Qingwei, Yang Kuangbao, Yang Caimei, Lai Chengde, Wu Azhi, Wu Aijiao, He Xiangde, Ying Xiegen, Wang Yuexia, Wang Haisheng, Zhang Yongsheng, Zhang Ming Xing, Zhang Xuemei, Lu Chunlan, Lu Xingyuan, Chen Shuangtian, Chen Zaixin, Chen Liangyin, Chen Amu, Chen Afu, Chen Linyuan, Fan Asong, Luo Xianggen, Zhou Wendian, Zhou Fengming, Zhao Zhongxiao, Hu Wenxiu, Hu Qinsheng, Hong Shuihua, Hong Xianyou, He Xianchun, Ni Huanqi, Gong Xiangcai, Sheng Baolong, Liang Guiying, Dong Yunfei, Dong Yumao, Han Yizhong, Lan Shenghua, Lou Helian, Tan Qilong, Dai Xiangmei, Qu Xiaonan	64	
1978	5th	Diao Caoshuang, Wang Rendong, Wang Donglan, Wang Huaxiang, Wang Zhaorui, Wang Jiwu, Wang Zufeng, Wang Gendi, Wang Peixin, Wang Jufeng, Wang Daogeng, Wang Fusheng, Wang Yaoting, Fang Zengxian, Li Yuhua, Ye Xiaofu, Zhu Shiyuan, Liu Yaozeng, Liu Pinqi, Liu Bingdai, Xu Bushao, Sun Meiying, Du Laiyun, Li Yuelian, Li Qingwei, Li Baoxing, Yang Kuangbao, Yang Yansheng, Yang Caimei, Yang Meiying, Wu Youxin, Wu Fengsheng, Wu Faqin, Wu Xinghui, He Xiangde, Ying Xiegen, Ying Qiugen, Wang Yuexia, Shen Axue, Shen Xuenian, Shen Zijiu, Lu Daida, Lu Xingyuan, Chen Youtang, Chen Zaixin, Chen You Sheng, Chen Liangyin, Chen Amu, Chen Afu, Chen Muhua, Shao Quanjian, Zhuo Yinchai, Luo Xianggen, Jin Baohua, Jin Shanbao, Zhou Dayuan, Zhou Kaibiao, Zhou Yongchang, Zhou Yanghui, Zhou Hongdeng, Zhao Aili, Hu Yulan, Hu Guanfa, Hu Shunquan, Hou Yujun, Yu Zuochen, Yu Shanwu, Nie Agen, Gu Gongxu, Tie Ying, Ni Huanqi, Xu Zhangkui, Xu Yihe, Xu Deyou, Tao Jian, Huang Zhigang, Gong Xiangcai, Sheng Baolong, Dong Dingrong, Dong Yumao, Jiao Jinfu, Lan Dazhu, Lou Shuiming, Yu Daxiang, Zhan Tongchao, Liao Xilong, Pan Guisui, Dai Xiangmei, Dai Songfu, Dai Jingyan, Wei Yaping	91	
1983	6th	Ma Mengsen, Wang Zhishan, Wang Jiwu, Wang Jinyou, Wang Chengbiao, Wang Chongjiu, Wang Meizhen, Wang Aidi, Wang Jiaheng, Bei Shizhang, Wen Yun, Ai Qing, Lu Shenliang, Ye Tinggao, Ye Rongxin, Kuang Yan, Zhu Ermei, Zhu Xigong, Zhu Yuenian, Zhu Puqiang, Ren Yisen, Liu Dan, Liu Yuan, Tang Linmei, Xu Bushao, Sun Jiayun, Li Yi, Li Yufang, Li Yifang, Li Chengwei, Li Xingjie, Li Huifen, Yang Zhikuan, Yang Liangdu, Wu Xiaoxuan, Wu Shichang, Wu Benzhong, Wu Lifang, Wu Hongmei, He Peide, Ying Liangdeng, Wang Yuexia, Wang Runsheng, Wang Jinghua, Shen Zhirong, Shen Zijiu, Shen Minjuan, Shen Hong, Shen Shanhong, Song Ruifu, Zhang Shi Chang, Zhang Xiumei, Zhang Meifeng, Zhang Minyu, Zhang Shufang, Lu Da, Lu Mingyang, Lu Xingyuan, Lu Yanshao, Chen Yunxian, Chen Shixiang, Chen Yongsong, Chen Yousheng, Chen Anyu, Chen Yunxian, Chen Jinhong, Chen Zongmao, Chen Zhuan, Chen Qiaoyi, Chen Xuefen, Chen Weizhang, Chen Xiqiang, Chen Murong, Lin Zexuan, Lin Fuchang, Lin Yaoguang, Ji Daofan, Jin Wenlu, Jin Baohua, Jin Shanbao, Zhou Renzheng, Zhou Zhineng, Zhou Chunhua, Zhou Siyu, Zheng Zhixin, Zheng Shu, Xiang Chunyi, Hu Yingfu, Hu Shunquan, Hu Yuzhi, Hou Yujun, Yu Shuijun, Xuan Guoyi, Yao Xiao'e, Xia Nai, Gu Gongxu, Gu Shilin, Qian Li, Tie Ying, Xu Bukui,Xu Qiashi, Xu Qichao, Guo Shaozhen, Tang Youzhi, Tang Menglong, Tao Rongsheng, Tao Jian, Huang Zhican, Sheng Xunqing, Tu Guizhang, Peng Ruilin, Dong Chaocai, Cheng Chunshu, Tong Tiebo, Xie Zhenrong, Lan Yu, Lu Yongxiang, Cai Kangchun, Zhai Yindi, Xue Ju, Qu Guohua	121	
1988	7th	Ding Yougen, Wang Anlai, Wang Jiwu, Wei Runshi, Deng Xiancan, Ye Rutang, Ye Liping, Ye Tinggao, Tian Xiaofu, Shi Meitang, Kuang Yan, Zhu Ermei, Zhu Qixin, Zhu Qi, Zhu Puqiang, Zhuang Zhiqing, Liu Meifang, Liu Yuan, Jiang Ping, Xu Bushao, Ruan Hui, Sun Zifu, Sun Yubao, Sun Shuyuan, Du Huiping, Wu Huaiying, Li Tianrong, Li Chengwei, Li Debao, Yang Liangdu, Lai Lechun, Wu Xiaoxuan, Wu Zixiong, Wu Wenqian, Wu Dongchai, Wu Min, Wu Hongmei, Wu Shida, Wu Shunchuan, Wu Minda, Wu Yaying, He Ren, He Junhua, Ying Liangdeng, Wang Duning, Wang Runsheng, Shen Yiming, Shen Zhirong, Shen Zulun, Shen Guifang, Shen Shan Hong, Zhang Yulan, Zhang Yulan, Zhang Shichang, Zhang Yongxiang, Zhang Zhenqi, Zhang Huailin, Zhang Bingxiang, Lu Da, Lu Yanshao, Chen Shiliang, Chen Wenxian, Chen Anyu, Chen Guoqiang, Chen Zongmao, Chen Zhuan, Chen Kangfei, Chen Weizhang, Fan Baling, Fan Lenian, Mao Weitao, Lin Puyan, Lin Yaoguang, Ji Daofan, Jin Wenlu, Zhou Yougen, Zhou Zhineng, Zhou Kezhi, Zhou Xiufen, Zhou Qingjiang, Zheng Zhixin, Zheng Shu, Zheng Fusheng, Xiang Bingyan, Xiang Chunyi, Zhao Landi, Hu Dehua, Li Jindi, Zhong Xiaomao, Zhong Boxi, Yu Zhiguang, Yu Zhanggen, Hong Zhenhuan, He Meili, Qin Jiqiang, Gu Gongxu, Gu Shilin, Qian Li, Ni Changsheng, Xu XukunXu Cangen, Xu Qichao, Guo Youyu, Tang Youzhi, Huang Mingzhi, Chang Shana, Zhang Fengxian, Liang Huanmu, Tu Guizhang, Dong Fureng, Dong Chaocai, Han Zhenxiang, Cheng Chunshu, Wen Xiaoyu, Lou Yun, Que Duanlin, Cai Yijiang, Pei Luqing, Fan Yaqin, Qu Shoubin	120	
1993	8th	Bu Zhaohui, Wan Xueyuan, Wang Yongming, Wang Qidong, Wang Jiasheng, Wang Suinai, Shi Meitang, Xing Bensi, Lü Shuying, Lü Lin, Zhu Chongqing, Zhu Hongfa, Zhu Zuxiang, Qiao Shi, Ren Zuyi, Wu Fuzhao, Zhuang Zhiqing, Liu Minchun, Liu Jinxia, Jiang Guoqing, Xu Xingguan, Xu Bushao, Sun Yubao, Sun Yongsen, Sun Youxian, Sun Shuyuan, Yan Wei, Li Chengbiao, Li Xingfen, Li Zemin, Li Juxuan, Yang Shaoshan, Yang Guodong, Yang Mingzhi, Wu Shanming, Wu Kedian, Wu Minda, Shen Zhirong, Shen Zulun, Shen Shanhong, Song Shaoxiang, Zhang Qingren, Zhang Qimei, Zhang Nianci, Zhang Bingxiang, Zhang Chonggan, Lu Zhongyue, Chen Shiliang, Chen Xiaowei, Chen Wenxian Chen Tonghai, Chen Huajiao, Chen Yibin, Chen Hongbing, Chen Guoqiang, Chen Shanmei, Chen Junliang, Chen Juanling, Fan Baling, Fan Lenian, Mao Weitao, Lin Xicai, Lin Puyan, Lin Yu, Ji Daofan, Jin Quancai, Jin Jingde, Jin Xin, Zhou Tianxiang, Zhou Qingjiang, Zheng Shousong, Zheng Fusheng, Xiang Bingyan, Xiang Chunyi, Zhao Zhenghua, Zhao Zhongguang, Zhao Zhangguang, Hu Zhixiang, Hong Zhenhuan, Yao Ke, Yao Qiming, Yao Haigen, Qin Jiqiang, Gu Shilin, Qian Huachun, Ni Changsheng, Xu Wenrong, Xu Cangen, Xu Fupei, Xu Hongdao, Xu Chaoxing, Gao Chunhua, Tang Youzhi, Huang Yazhou, Huang Mingzhi, Gong Xuezhen, Sheng Changli, Chang Shana, Zhang Fengxian, Zhang Ji'anZhang Jinxiang, Liang Huanmu, Peng Guozhen, Ge Hongsheng, Dong Guangfu, Dong Fureng, Jiang Fudi, Han Tianzhen, Han Zengcui, Cheng Suying, Tong Kezu, Xie Gaohua, Lei Wenxian, Pei Luqing, Pan Yanfei, Xue Ju, Wei Yangsu	117	
1998	9th	Bu Zhaohui, Wang Yudi, Wang Yongming, Wang Gang, Wang Peijun, Wang Huizhong, Mao Zhaoxi, Mao Binyao, Lu Wenge, Ye Wenling, Ye Rutang, Ye Zheming, Ye Jige, Bai Hua, Feng Mingguang, Xing Bensi, Cheng Yangzhen, Lü Congmin, Zhuang Qichuan, Xu Xingguan, Du Zihong, Li Rucheng, Li Zemin, Li Juxuan, Li Lingwei, Yang Renzheng, Yang Chengtao, Yang Guodong, Yang Mingzhi, Wang Huifang, Shen Aiqin, Shen Jingzhu, Zhang Sanli, Zhang Xiufu, Zhang Nianci, Zhang Jiaren, Zhang Weiwen, Zhang Dejiang, Chen Huajiao, Chen Hongbing, Chen Chunying, Chen Junliang, Chen Jilai, Mao Weitao, Lin Huazhong, Lin Xicai, Jin Xin Zheng Xiaoming, Zheng Shangjin, Xiang Bingyan, Xiang Jianping, Zhao Linzhong, Nan Cunhui, Ke Xixi, Zhong Xiaomao (She ethnic group), Zhong Shan, Yao Ke, Yao Haigen, Yuan Rongxiang, Xia Yichang, Chai Songyue, Qian Xingzhong, Xu Zhichun, Xu Chengnan, Xu Chaoxing, Weng Lihua, Guo Xuehuan, Huang Xiaolian, Sheng Changli, Chang Shana (Manchu ethnic group), Zhang Fengxian, Zhang Mengjin, Zhang Jinxiang, Peng Peiyun, Ge Yingzi, Dong Weiping, Dong Junshu, Jiang Fudi (Hui ethnic group), Fu Yiming, Lu Guanqiu, Xie Qingjian, Lei Zhaozhu (She ethnic group), Yu Zhongying, Yi Gendi, Pei Luqing, Fan Shizhou, Fan Caisheng, Teng Zengshou, Pan Yunhe, Pan Chunjuan	89	
2003	10th	Xi Jinping, Wang Ping'an (Hui nationality), Wang Yongchang, Wang Yongkang, Wang Gang, Wang Xufeng (female), Wang Songlin, Wang Cuixiang (female), Li Zhihai, Ye Rutang, Feng Changgen, Feng Ming (female), Cheng Yangzhen (female), Lü Shilin, Lü Fan (female), Lü Zushan, Lü Congmin, Zhu Zhigen, Zhu Lilan (female), Zhu Yinmei (female), Ren Jichang, Zhuang Qichuan, Liu Qi, Xu Jiang, Xu Ai'e (female), Sun Yongsen, Su Zengfu, Li Bangliang, Li Rucheng, Li Guoguang, Li Zemin, Li Qiang, Li Lu'er (female), Yang Guoxun, Wu Yi (female), Wu Zuodong, Yu Hongyi (female), Wang Xiaocun, Wang Huifang (female), Shen Lianqing (female), Shen Aiqin (female), Zhang Qimei, Zhang Jiameng Lu Zhengyi, Chen Jiansheng, Chen Yong (female), Chen Haixiao, Chen Nanxian, Chen Derong, Chen Yaodong, Fan Yi, Mao Weitao (female), Mao Linsheng, Lin Shengxiong, Lin Huazhong, Jin Yingying (female), Jin Deshui, Zhou Xiaoguang (female), Zong Qinghou, Xiang Jianping (female), Zhao Linzhong, Hu Jirong, Nan Cunhui, Hou Jingfang, Shi Jixing, Yao Ke, Yao Haigen, Xia Shilin, Ni Yuefeng, Xu Zhichun, Weng Lihua, Huang Youyuan, Huang Kunming, Sheng Changli (female), Liang Yi, Ge Zheng, Jiang Fudi (Hui), Fu Yiming (female), Fu Qiping, Lu Guanqiu, Xie Liqun, Lan Qiangen (She), Lou Yangsheng, Lou Zhongfu, Chu Jian, Cai Risheng, Pan Yunhe, Pan Shouli, Qu Sufeng (female).	89	
2008	11th	Yu Huida, Ma Yi, Wang Xiaotong, Wang Renzhou, Wang Ping'an (Hui nationality), Wang Yongming, Wang Ming, Wang Jianhua, Wang Meizhen (female), You Xiaoping, Che Xiaoduan (female), Mao Guanglie, Fang Zhonghua, Fang Qing (female), Li Yuezi (female), Lu Yiyu, Feng Changgen, Lü Fan (female), Lü Zushan, Zhu Xinkang, Qiao Chuanxiu (female), Ren Meiqin (female), Zhuang Qichuan, Liu Xiping, Liu Xirong, Xu Jiang, Sun Wei, Sun Jianguo, Li Dapeng, Li Weining, Li Linghong, Li Rucheng, Li Mu, Li Keping, Yang Wei, Yang Chengtao, Yang Xiaoxia (female), Wu Ziying (female), Wu Guohua, Wu Guiying (female), Qiu Jibao, Wang Huifang (female), Zhang Jinru, Zhang Jianxing, Zhang Xin Jian, Zhang Dejiang, Lu Yuansheng, Lu Dongfu, Chen Xiaoen, Chen Fei, Chen Yunlong, Chen Kunzhong, Chen Ronggao, Chen Tiexiong, Chen Xiaohua (female), Chen Haixiao, Si Jianmin, Shao Zhanwei, Fan Yi, Mao Weitao (female), Lin Yi (female), Jin Yingying (female), Zhou Xiaoguang (female), Zheng Yuxin, Zheng Jiemin, Zheng Jiwei, Zong Qinghou, Zhao Feng, Zhao Linzhong, Zhao Hongzhu, Nan Cunhui, Zhong Changming (She ethnic group), Yu Xuewen, Yao Xianping, Xia Shilin, Ni Yuefeng, Xu Qiufang (female), Cao Mianying (female), Cui Wei (female), Yan Shougen, Liang Liming (female), Han Qide, Cheng Huifang (female), Fu Qiping, Lu Guanqiu, Chu Ping, Cai Qi, Miao Shuijuan (female), Xue Shaoxian	90	
2013	12th	Ding Lieming, Ma Rongrong, Wang Yueying (female), Wang Wenjuan (female), Wang Yongkang, Wang Ming, Wang Jincai, Wang Tingge, Wang Shengming, You Xiaoping, Che Xiaoduan (female), Fang Zhonghua, Fang Qing (female), Ye Feifan, Ye Xinhua, Feng Changgen, Lü Huarong (female), Lü Zushan, Lü Caixia (female), Zhu Zhangjin, Liu Qi, Qi Qi, Xu Jiang, Xu Zhongming, Xu Ting (female), Sun Qin, Li Linghong, Li Lingwei (female), Li Keping, Li Qiang, Yang Wei, Yang Xiaoxia (female), Yang Wu, Wu Dongliang, Wu Shunjiang, ~~Wu Weirong~~, Qiu Guanghe, Shen Renkang, Shen Yueyue (female), Shen Qifang (female), Song Wei, Zhang Tianren, Zhang Huaming, Zhang Dejiang, Chen Shiyi, Chen Naike, Chen Yunlong, Chen Jinping, Chen Lizhong, Chen Jinbiao Chen Baohua, Chen Jianping, Chen Zhenlian, Chen Xiaohua (female), Chen Ailian (female), Chen Haixiao, Chen Laying (female), Si Jianmin, ~~Shao Zhanwei~~, Shao Ning, Mao Linsheng, Lin Chuiwu, Lin Yi (female), Jin Changzheng (female, Hui nationality), Zhou Guohui, Zheng Yuhong (female), Zheng Jianjiang, Zheng Jiwei, Zheng Xuejun (female), Zong Qinghou, Lang Sheng, Zhao Feng, Hu Jiqiang, Zhong Tianhua, Yu Xuewen, Hong Hangyong, Xia Baolong, Chai Lineng, Qian Jianmin, Xu Dongxiang (female), Xu Jia'ai, Xu Qiufang (female), Xu Aihua (female), Huang Zuoxing, Huang Jinchao, Cao Kejian, Cui Wei (female), Ge Minghua, Jiang Shengsan, Fu Qiping, Lu Jun (female), Lan Lingli (female, She nationality), Yu Chun (female), Xue Shaoxian, Dai Tianrong, Qu Jia	96	
2018	13th	Ding Lieming, Yu Yuemin (female), Ma Weiguang, Ma Rongrong, Wang Chen, Wang Wei, Wang Huizhong, Wang Binmei (female), Yuan Maorong, Che Jun, Fang Min (female), Fang Zhonghua,~~Fang Jianqiao~~Yin Xuequn, Deng Li (female), Ye Shiwen (female), Ye Xinhua, Lü Shiming, Liu Ting, Liu Rui (female), Liu Jianming, Liu Jianchao, Sun Jun, Sun Guowen, Li Shufu, Li Zhanguo, Li Lingwei (female), Yang Jinlong, Bu Zhenghe, Wu Xiaodong, Qiu Guanghe, Yu Hongyi (female), Zou Xiaodong, Wang Kang, Shen Yan, Shen Manhong, Shen Defa, Zhang Bing,~~Zhang Geng~~Zhang Tianren, Zhang Shifang, Zhang Sujun, Zhang Yongmei (female), Zhang Zhifen (female), Zhang Jianchao, Chen Wei (female), Chen Naike (returned overseas Chinese), Chen Zongnian, Chen Baohua, Chen Aizhu (female), Chen Ailian (female), Si Jianmin, Lin Yi, Lin Tiangan, Ou Qi, Luo Weihong (female), Zhou Hui (female), Zhou Zhonglian (female), Zheng Jie, Zheng Yali (female), Zheng Jianjiang, Zheng Yucai, Hu Shaoxian, Hu Chengzhong, Hu Jiqiang, Hu Haifeng, Ke Jianhua (female), Zhong Haiyan (female, She ethnic group), Yu Xuewen, Yuan Jing (female), Yuan Jiajun, Jia Yu, Xia Yongxiang, Qian Sanxiong, Xu Wenguang, Xu Liyi, Xu Yuning, Xu Guanju, Weng Lifen (female), Xi Wen, Huang Zhengren, Huang Meimei (female), Cui Wei (female), Zhang Guoqiang, Liang Liming (female), Ge Minghua, Ge Yiping, Jiang Shengnan (female), Wen Nuan, Qiu Dongyao, Dou Shuhua, Cai Jiming, Teng Baogui, Pan Meier (female).	94	
2023	14th	Wan Lijun, Wang Jie, Wang Hao, Wang Yi, Wang Liping, Wang Jianyi, Fang Xiaohong, Fang Haolong, Yin Xuequn, Ye Miao, Ye Xinhua, Xing Zhihong, Liu Ting, Liu Rui, Liu Guoyong, Liu Jianming, Jiang Yong, Tang Feifan, Xu Ganlu, Mai Jia, Li Jun, Li Huolin, Li Zhanguo, Li Anrui, Li Xiaokun, Li Zhihui, Li Jinghai, Yang Jinlong, Yang Jianyu, Wu Jing, Wu Xiaodong, Wu Haiping, Wu Shunze, Wu Weiwei, Wang Yucheng, Zhang Qi, Zhang Tianren, Zhang Yabo, Zhang Jiangping, Zhang Yongmei, Zhang Zhenfeng, Lu Rongjie, Chen Xiaojing, Chen Anwei, Chen Wei, Chen Yufei, Chen Jinbiao, Chen Lingling, Chen Baohua, Chen Yingying Chen Aizhu, Chen Xuehua, Chen Shufang, Lin Yiying, Shang Haihong, Yi Lianhong, Luo Weihong, Zhou Di, Zhou Youyong, Zheng Guo, Meng Hongjuan, Hao Mingjin, Hu Wei, Hu Dongfang, Hu Chengzhong, Yu Zhihong, Shi Wenmei, Shi Huifang, Zhu Xiangxiang, Fei Shaobiao, Yao Gaoyuan, Mo Dingge, Xia Yongxiang, Qian Haijun, Xu Renbiao, Xu Zhangyan, Xu Guanju, Gao Yingzhong, Guo Wenbiao, Guo Shuqing, Huang Wenxiu, Huang Meimei, Cao Chen, Liang Tingbo, Liang Liming, Tu Hongyan, Ge Minghua, Ge Bingzao, Han Qifang, Han Xiqiu, Fu Mingxian, Fu Guirong, Lu Weiding, Xie Li, Lan Jingfen, Cai Yuanqiang, Cai Zhefei, Fan Shenghua, Liu Jie	99	
