= Zhejiang Provincial People's Government =

Provincial government in Zheijang, China

Zhejiang Provincial People's Government 浙江省人民政府
- Established: 29 July 1949

Leadership
- Governor: Wang Hao since 30 September 2021
- Executive Deputy Governor: Xu Wenguang
- Deputy Governors: Lu Shan, Zhang Yanyun, Hu Wei, Li Yanyi, Yang Qingjiu, Ke Jixin, Zhang Zhenfeng
- Secretary-general: Xu Dake
- Parent body: Central People's Government; Zhejiang Provincial People's Congress
- Elected by: Zhejiang Provincial People's Congress

Website
- www.zj.gov.cn

The Zhejiang Provincial People's Government is the provincial administrative agency of Zhejiang. It is officially elected by the Zhejiang Provincial People's Congress and is formally responsible to the ZPPC and its Standing Committee. The provincial government is headed by a governor, currently Wang Hao. Under the country's one-party system, the governor is subordinate to the secretary of the Zhejiang Provincial Committee of the Chinese Communist Party.

== History ==
The Zhejiang Provincial People's Government was established on 29 July 1949. In January 1955, it was renamed the Zhejiang Provincial People's Committee.

In March 1967, during the Cultural Revolution, Zhejiang entered military rule, with the establishment of the Zhejiang Provincial Military Control Committee of the People's Liberation Army in Hangzhou and the dissolution of the People's Committee. In 1968, the Zhejiang Revolutionary Committee was established. In December 1979, the Zhejiang Provincial People's Government was re-established.

== Organization ==
The organization of the Zhejiang Provincial People's Government includes:

- General Office of the Zhejiang Provincial People's Government

=== Component Departments ===
- Zhejiang Provincial Development and Reform Commission
- Zhejiang Provincial Department of Economy and Information Technology
- Zhejiang Provincial Department of Education
- Zhejiang Provincial Department of Science and Technology
- Zhejiang Provincial Ethnic and Religious Affairs Committee
- Zhejiang Provincial Public Security Department
- Zhejiang Provincial Department of Civil Affairs
- Zhejiang Provincial Department of Justice
- Zhejiang Provincial Department of Finance
- Zhejiang Provincial Department of Human Resources and Social Security
- Zhejiang Provincial Department of Natural Resources
- Zhejiang Provincial Department of Ecology and Environment
- Zhejiang Provincial Department of Housing and Urban-Rural Development
- Zhejiang Provincial Department of Transportation
- Zhejiang Provincial Water Resources Department
- Zhejiang Provincial Department of Agriculture and Rural Affairs
- Zhejiang Provincial Department of Commerce
- Zhejiang Provincial Department of Culture and Tourism
- Zhejiang Provincial Health Commission
- Zhejiang Provincial Department of Veterans Affairs
- Zhejiang Provincial Emergency Management Department
- Zhejiang Provincial Audit Office
- Foreign Affairs Office of the Zhejiang Provincial People's Government

=== Directly affiliated special institutions ===
- State-owned Assets Supervision and Administration Commission of Zhejiang Provincial People's Government

=== Organizations under the Provincial Government ===
- Zhejiang Ocean Port Development Committee
- Zhejiang Provincial People's Government Advisory Committee
- Zhejiang Development Planning Institute
- Zhejiang Ocean Development Research Institute
- Zhejiang Academy of Agricultural Sciences
- Zhejiang Tsinghua Yangtze River Delta Research Institute
- Zhejiang Academy of Social Sciences
- Zhijiang Laboratory
- Zhejiang Provincial Local Chronicles Office
- Zhejiang Radio and Television Group
- Zhejiang Machinery Equipment Complete Set Bureau
- Zhejiang Provincial Bureau of Geological Survey
- Zhejiang Nonferrous Metals Geological Exploration Bureau
- Zhejiang Federation of Supply and Marketing Cooperatives
- China National Silk Museum

== Leadership ==
Name	Office	Party	Date of birth	Other offices	Ref.
Wang Hao	Governor Secretary of the Provincial Government Party Leading Group	CCP	October 1963 (age 63)	Deputy Secretary of the Party Zhejiang Provincial Committee Member of the CCP Central Committee	
Xu Wenguang	Executive Deputy Governor Deputy Secretary of the Party Leading Group	CCP	October 1968 (age 58)		
Lu Shan	Deputy Governor Member of the Party Leading Group	CCP	May 1972 (age 54)		
Zhang Yanyun	Deputy Governor Member of the Party Leading Group	CCP	August 1966 (age 60)		
Hu Wei	Deputy Governor	CZGP	November 1969 (age 56–57)	Chairperson of the Zhejiang Provincial Committee of the CZGP	
Li Yanyi	Deputy Governor Member of the Party Leading Group	CCP	February 1967 (age 59)		
Yang Qingjiu	Deputy Governor Member of the Party Leading Group	CCP	April 1969 (age 57)	Director of the Zhejiang Provincial Public Security Department	
Ke Jixin	Deputy Governor Member of the Party Leading Group	CCP	January 1968 (age 58)		
Xu Dake	Secretary-General Member of the Party Leading Group	CCP	November 1971 (age 54–55)		

=== Previous leaderships ===
16th Municipal People's Government (January 2023–)

- Governor: Wang Hao
- Deputy Governors: Xu Wenguang, Lu Shan, Zhang Yanyun, Hu Wei, Li Yanyi, Yang Qingjiu, Ke Jixin, Wang Wenxu (until December 2023)
- Secretary-Genera: Xu Dake
