= Party Secretary of Zhejiang =

Provincial government position in China

Secretary of the Zhejiang Provincial Committee of the Chinese Communist Party
- 中国共产党浙江省委员会书记
- Emblem of the Chinese Communist Party

- Flag of the Chinese Communist Party
- Incumbent; Wang Hao since 28 October 2024
- Zhejiang Provincial Committee of the Chinese Communist Party
- Type: Party Committee Secretary
- Status: Provincial and ministerial-level official
- Member of: Zhejiang Provincial Standing Committee
- Nominator: Central Committee
- Appointer: Zhejiang Provincial Committee; Central Committee
- Inaugural holder: Ye Jianying
- Formation: 6 May 1949
- Deputy: Deputy Secretary; Secretary-General

The secretary of the Zhejiang Provincial Committee of the Chinese Communist Party is the leader of the Zhejiang Provincial Committee of the Chinese Communist Party (CCP). As the CCP is the sole ruling party of the People's Republic of China (PRC), the secretary is the highest ranking post in Zhejiang.

The secretary is officially appointed by the CCP Central Committee based on the recommendation of the CCP Organization Department, which is then approved by the Politburo and its Standing Committee. The secretary can be also appointed by a plenary meeting of the Zhejiang Provincial Committee, but the candidate must be the same as the one approved by the central government. The secretary leads the Standing Committee of the Zhejiang Provincial Committee, and is usually a member of the CCP Central Committee. The secretary leads the work of the Provincial Committee and its Standing Committee. The secretary is outranks the governor, who is generally the deputy secretary of the committee.

The current secretary is Wang Hao, who took office on 28 October 2024.

== List of party secretaries ==
| No. | Image | Name | Term start | Term end | Ref. |
|---|---|---|---|---|---|
| 1 | | Tan Zhenlin | 6 May 1949 | September 1952 | |
| 2 | | Tan Qilong | September 1952 | August 1954 | |
| 3 | | Jiang Hua | August 1954 | January 1967 | |
| 4 | | Nan Ping | March 1968 | May 1973 | |
| 5 | | Tan Qilong | May 1973 | February 1977 | |
| 6 | | Tie Ying | February 1977 | March 1983 | |
| 7 | | Wang Fang | March 1983 | March 1987 | |
| 8 | | Xue Ju | March 1987 | December 1988 | |
| 9 | | Li Zemin | December 1988 | September 1998 | |
| 10 | | Zhang Dejiang | 16 September 1998 | 24 December 2002 | |
| 11 | | Xi Jinping | 24 December 2002 | 25 March 2007 | |
| 12 | | Zhao Hongzhu | 25 March 2007 | 21 November 2012 | |
| 13 | | Xia Baolong | 18 December 2012 | 26 April 2017 | |
| 14 | | Che Jun | 26 April 2017 | 31 August 2020 | |
| 15 | | Yuan Jiajun | 31 August 2020 | 7 December 2022 | |
| 16 | | Yi Lianhong | 7 December 2022 | 28 October 2024 | |
| 17 | | Wang Hao | 28 October 2024 | Incumbent | |
