= Zhejiang Provincial People's Congress =

Zhejiang Provincial People's Congress 浙江省人民代表大会
- 14th Zhejiang Provincial People's Congress

Type
- Type: Province-level people's congress

Leadership
- Chairman of the Standing Committee: Wang Hao, CCP since January 2025
- Vice Chairpersons of the Standing Committee: Chen Jinbiao, Xing Xingfu, Wu Jing, Liu Xin, Zhao Guangjun, Ji Junmin, CCP
- Secretary-General of the Standing Committee: Lu Jun, CCP

Elections
- Zhejiang Provincial People's Congress voting system: Plurality-at-large voting & Two-round system

Website
- www.zjrd.gov.cn

Zhejiang Provincial People's Congress
- Simplified Chinese: 浙江省人民代表大会
- Traditional Chinese: 浙江省人民代表大會
Transcriptions
Standard Mandarin
- Hanyu Pinyin: Zhèjiāng Shěng Rénmín Dàibiǎo Dàhuì

The Zhejiang Provincial People's Congress is the people's congress of Zhejiang, a province of China. The Congress is elected for a term of five years. The Zhejiang Provincial People's Congress meetings are held at least once a year. After a proposal by more than one-fifth of the deputies, a meeting of the people's congress at the corresponding level may be convened temporarily.

== Organization ==
=== Chairpersons of the Standing Committee ===
Name	Took office	Left office
Tie Ying	December 1979	January 1988
Chen Anyu	January 1988	January 1993
Li Zemin	January 1993	January 2003
Xi Jinping	January 2003	May 2007
Yu Guoxing (acting)	May 2007	January 2008
Zhao Hongzhu	January 2008	January 2013
Xia Baolong	January 2013	April 2017
Che Jun	April 2017	September 2020
Yuan Jiajun	29 September 2020	December 2022
Yi Lianhong	January 2023	November 2024
Wang Hao	January 2025	Incumbent

== See also ==
- System of people's congress
