= Sima Gao Bridge =

Sima Gao Bridge 司马高桥
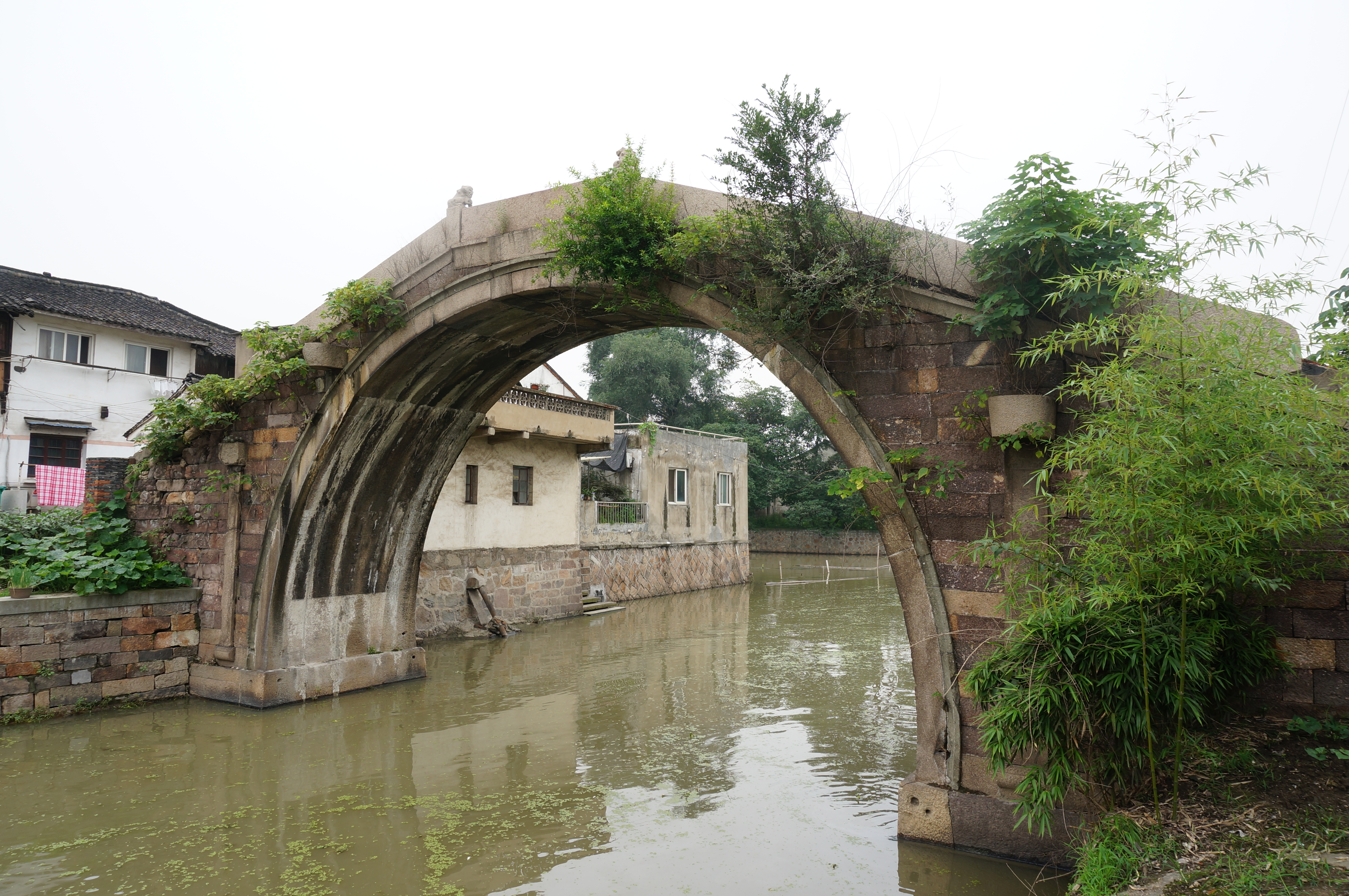
- The Sima Gao Bridge in June 2014.
- Coordinates: 30°31′50″N 120°26′43″E
- Crosses: Moat
- Locale: Chongfu, Tongxiang, Zhejiang, China
- Other name(s): Gao Bridge

Characteristics
- Design: Arch Bridge
- Material: Stone
- Total length: 19.4 metres (64 ft)
- Width: 3 metres (9.8 ft)
- Height: 5 metres (16 ft)
- Longest span: 9.7 metres (32 ft)

History
- Construction start: 14th century
- Construction end: 1876 (reconstruction)

Sima Gao Bridge (simplified Chinese: 司马高桥; traditional Chinese: 司馬高橋; pinyin: Sīmǎ Gāo Qiáo) is a historic stone arch bridge in the town of Chongfu, Tongxiang, Zhejiang, China.

== History ==
The bridge was first built in the 14th century, in the ruling of Hongwu Emperor in the Ming dynasty (1368–1644). It was rebuilt in 1749, in the 14th year of Qianlong Emperor's reign during the Qing dynasty (1644–1911), and was damaged by war in 1864, in the ruling of Tongzhi Emperor. Yu Liyuan (余丽元), the magistrate of Shimen County, reconstructed it in 1876. In March 2005, it was designated as a cultural relic protection unit at provincial level by the Zhejiang Government.

== Architecture ==
The bridge measures 19.4 metres (64 ft) long, 3 metres (9.8 ft) wide, and approximately 5 metres (16 ft) high. A pair of Chinese guardian lions stands on both sides of its baluster shafts.
