= Xia Baolong =

Chinese politician (born 1952)

- 夏宝龙
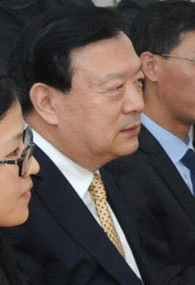
- Xia in November 2014

Director of the Hong Kong and Macau Work Office
- Incumbent
- Assumed office February 13, 2020
- Premier: Li Keqiang; Li Qiang
- Deputy: Zhang Xiaoming; Luo Huining; Fu Ziying
- Preceded by: Zhang Xiaoming

Vice Chairman of the Chinese People's Political Consultative Conference
- In office 14 March 2018 – 10 March 2023
- Chairman: Wang Yang

Secretary-General of the National Committee of the Chinese People's Political Consultative Conference
- In office 14 March 2018 – 27 May 2020
- Chairman: Wang Yang
- Preceded by: Zhang Qingli
- Succeeded by: Li Bin

Party Secretary of Zhejiang
- In office 18 December 2012 – 26 April 2017
- Deputy: Li Qiang (Governor); Wang Huizhong
- Preceded by: Zhao Hongzhu
- Succeeded by: Che Jun

Director of the Zhejiang Provincial People's Congress
- In office January 2013 – April 2017
- Preceded by: Zhao Hongzhu
- Succeeded by: Che Jun

Governor of Zhejiang
- In office August 2011 – 21 December 2012
- Party Secretary: Zhao Hongzhu
- Preceded by: Lü Zushan
- Succeeded by: Li Qiang

Personal details
- Born: 2 December 1952 (age 73) Tianjin, China
- Party: Chinese Communist Party

Chinese name
- Traditional Chinese: 夏寶龍
- Simplified Chinese: 夏宝龙
Transcriptions
Standard Mandarin
- Hanyu Pinyin: Xià Bǎolóng

Xia Baolong (Chinese: 夏宝龙; pinyin: Xià Bǎolóng; born 2 December 1952) is a Chinese politician. Originally from Tianjin, Xia began his political career in the Communist Youth League. He served as the vice mayor of Tianjin, governor and Party Secretary of Zhejiang province. Between 2018 and 2023, he served as a vice chairman of the 13th Chinese People's Political Consultative Conference (CPPCC), being its secretary general from 2018 to 2020. Xia was appointed director of the Hong Kong and Macau Affairs Office in February 2020.

== Early life ==
Xia Baolong was born in Tianjin. In his youth, Xia was an elementary and high school teacher in Hebei and Tianjin, and a grassroots level official of the Communist Youth League. He joined the Chinese Communist Party in November 1973. He received a degree in Chinese from Hexi District Workers' University (天津市河西区职工大学), an adult-education college, in 1980. Later he rose to the positions of Party Secretary and governor of Hexi District, and then Vice Mayor of Tianjin. Between 1999 and 2003 he studied political economics at Peking University. He has a doctoral degree in Economics.

== Political career ==
Xia Baolong was an alternate of the 15th, 16th, and 17th Central Committees, and a full member of the 18th Central Committee of the Chinese Communist Party.

=== Zhejiang ===
In November 2003, Xia was transferred to Zhejiang to become a Deputy Party Secretary of the province. Xia served under then-Zhejiang Party Secretary Xi Jinping. In August 2011, he became the acting governor of Zhejiang, succeeding Lü Zushan, and was officially elected as governor in January 2012. On 18 December 2012, he was promoted to Party Secretary of Zhejiang, the top political office of the province.

Xia is alleged to have issued orders for the removal of thousands of crosses from churches, including the Sanjiang Church in the Wenzhou area. Wenzhou is considered a centre of Christianity in China, and has been referred to popularly as "China's Jerusalem".

Under Xia, Zhejiang hosted the 2016 G20 Summit in Hangzhou. He also attempted to attract Zhejiang businesspeople from abroad. In April 2017 he became a member of the National People's Congress Environment Protection and Resources Conservation Committee.

=== Hong Kong ===
On 13 February 2020, Xia was appointed director of the Hong Kong and Macau Affairs Office.

In August 2020, Xia and ten other officials were sanctioned by the United States Department of the Treasury under Executive Order 13936 by President Trump for undermining Hong Kong's autonomy. On October 14, 2020, the United States Department of State released a report on 10 individuals who materially contributed to the failure of the China to meet its obligations under the Sino–British Joint Declaration and Hong Kong's Basic Law. Xia was on the list.

In February 2021, Xia said that only "patriots" could govern Hong Kong, and that positions in the executive, legislature and judiciary must follow the order. Xia also claimed that "In terms of those rioters who are anti-China and who instigate riots with extremely notorious acts, for example, Jimmy Lai, Benny Tai and Joshua Wong, they are not only prohibited from interfering in any public power of the HKSAR, they also need to be punished severely in accordance with the law." Additionally, Xia said that principle of "patriots" governing Hong Kong should also extend towards the education system.

In December 2021, Xia said that the people of Hong Kong would soon get "real" democracy under the new electoral system, where only "patriots" are allowed to serve. In April 2023, Xia said that "There are many channels and ways to express interests and demands, they are diverse and a protest is not the only way to express interests and demands."

In April 2025, Xia delivered a video speech on the 10th National Security Education Day in Hong Kong, where he said the "US isn't after our tariffs — it is after our very survival" and urged Hong Kong to "stand firmly with the motherland and on the right side of history". In June 2025, Xia visited Hong Kong to attend a government forum marking the fifth anniversary of the national security law, where he said that "Profound changes are occurring inside and outside Hong Kong. It is necessary to fully implement the One Country, Two Systems principle, guided by national security, to provide favorable safety protection for achieving better development of Hong Kong". In July 2026, he met with members of the Hong Kong Legislative Council who were visiting Beijing, calling them to "assume a greater role in supporting the chief executive and the [government] in administering Hong Kong in accordance with the law, so as to enhance governance efficacy of [the city], inject new impetus into the city's growth and tackle the most pressing concerns of the people".

Party political offices
Preceded by Zhao Hongzhu	Party Secretary of Zhejiang; 2012–2017	Succeeded by Che Jun
Government offices
Preceded by Zhang Xiaoming	Director of Hong Kong and Macau Affairs Office; 2020－	Incumbent
Preceded by Lü Zushan	Governor of Zhejiang; 2011–2012	Succeeded by Li Qiang
