= Yu Guoxing =

Chinese politician

Yu Guoxing (Chinese: 俞国行; born December 1944) is a politician of the People's Republic of China and the former chairman of Zhejiang People's Congress.

A native of Zhuji, Zhejiang, Yu started working in March 1965, and joined the Chinese Communist Party in July 1965. He graduated from the CCP Central Party School. Yu formerly served as vice Party secretary of Qingshan Commune of Zhuji County, Party secretary of Bao'an Commune of Zhuji, secretary of Communist Youth League Shaoxing committee, director of Publicity Department of Shaoxing, secretary-general of CCP Shaoxing committee, and vice mayor of Shaoxing. He later became vice Party chief of Shaoxing and secretary of Political and Legislative Affairs Commission of Shaoxing. He was then transferred to Huzhou and became the Party chief in that city and chairman of local People's Congress. Yu was appointed as director of Zhejiang Provincial Bureau of Public Security, and later, vice chairman of Zhejiang People's Congress. On May 25, 2007, Yu was elected as the acting chairman of Zhejiang People's Congress after the transfer of Xi Jinping. He served this post till January 2008.

Political offices
Preceded by Xi Jinping	Zhejiang People's Congress Chairman; 2007–2008	Succeeded by Zhao Hongzhu
