= Jiang Hua =

Chinese politician

- 江华
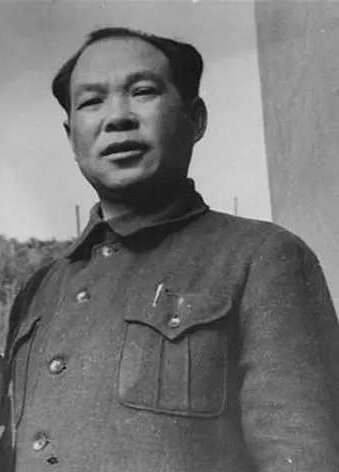

President of the Supreme People's Court
- In office 20 January 1975 – 20 June 1983
- Preceded by: Yang Xiufeng
- Succeeded by: Zheng Tianxiang

Party Secretary of Zhejiang
- In office August 1954 – January 1967
- Preceded by: Tan Qilong
- Succeeded by: Long Qian

Chairman of the Zhejiang Provincial Committee of the Chinese People's Political Consultative Conference
- In office August 1954 – January 1967
- Preceded by: Tan Qilong
- Succeeded by: Tie Ying

Party Secretary of Hangzhou
- In office August 1949 – July 1951
- Preceded by: Tan Zhenlin
- Succeeded by: Wu Xian

Mayor of Hangzhou
- In office September 1949 – July 1951
- Preceded by: Tan Zhenlin
- Succeeded by: Wu Xian

Personal details
- Born: August 1, 1907 Jianghua County, Hunan, Qing China
- Died: December 24, 1999 (aged 92) Hangzhou, Zhejiang, China
- Party: Chinese Communist Party
- Spouse: Wu Zhonglian

Jiang Hua
- Traditional Chinese: 江華
- Simplified Chinese: 江华
Transcriptions
Standard Mandarin
- Hanyu Pinyin: Jiāng Huá

Jiang Hua (1 August 1907 – 24 December 1999), born Yu Shangcong (虞上聪), was a Chinese politician of Yao ethnicity who served as Party Secretary of Zhejiang from 1954 to the Cultural Revolution and as president of the Supreme People's Court from 1975 to 1983. A veteran of the Jinggangshan base and the Long March, he presided over the special court that tried the Gang of Four and the associates of Lin Biao in 1980 and 1981.

== Early life ==
Jiang Hua was born Yu Shangcong on 1 August 1907 in Zhegutang village, Dashiqiao Township, in Jianghua County, Hunan. He was of Yao ethnicity. In the summer of 1920, he entered a county primary school more than 30 kilometres from his home. After graduating from higher primary school in the summer of 1925, he enrolled at the Hunan Provincial Third Normal School. He joined the Communist Youth League at the school in October 1925, and became a member of the Chinese Communist Party (CCP) in the winter of 1926.

== Revolutionary career ==
In 1926 and 1927, Jiang held Youth League and trade union posts in southern Hunan, including in Hengyang. From May 1927, he worked as a political courier for the party's Southern Hunan Special Committee and the Hunan Provincial Committee, carrying documents to Changsha under the alias Huang Lin. From October 1927, he worked for the party committees of Anyuan and Pingxiang. In May 1928, he became party secretary of Chaling County and went to the Jinggangshan base, where he first met Mao Zedong at Maoping. He later served as secretary-general of the political department of the Fourth Red Army.

In June 1929, after the 7th Congress of the Fourth Red Army at Longyan, Jiang was appointed secretary-general of the West Fujian Special Committee. Late that year, he went to Xiamen for treatment for malaria and an eye condition, and took the name Huang Chunpu, which he used for nearly a decade. After the Third Army Group of Peng Dehuai captured Changsha on 27 July 1930, he became political commissar of a regiment in its 1st Division. He later served as political commissar of a division of the Third Army Group and of the Central Guard Regiment. On 14 October 1934, he set out with the Third Army Group on the Long March.

After the Long March, Jiang commanded the Guanzhong military sub-district, headed the political department of the 28th Army and led the Fourth Bureau of the Central Military Commission. In December 1936, during the Xi'an Incident, he led troops to take over Yan'an, and became political commissar of its city defence headquarters. He was a member of the first class at the Anti-Japanese Military and Political University in 1937.

In the summer of 1938, Jiang was appointed director of the political department of the Shandong Column of the Eighth Route Army. With Mao's approval, he took the name Jiang Hua, after his home county, and he used it for the rest of his life. Before leaving Yan'an in 1938, he and Wu Zhonglian applied to marry, and Mao approved the marriage. He arrived in Shandong in August 1938 after a three-month journey. In September 1939, he took command of the Su–Wan Column, and over the following year he expanded it to more than 10,000 troops and helped to establish the Su–Wan base area. He later headed the political department of the Shandong Military Region. In the winter of 1943, he returned to Yan'an to study at the Central Party School, and in the summer of 1945 he attended the 7th National Congress of the CCP as deputy head of the Shandong delegation.

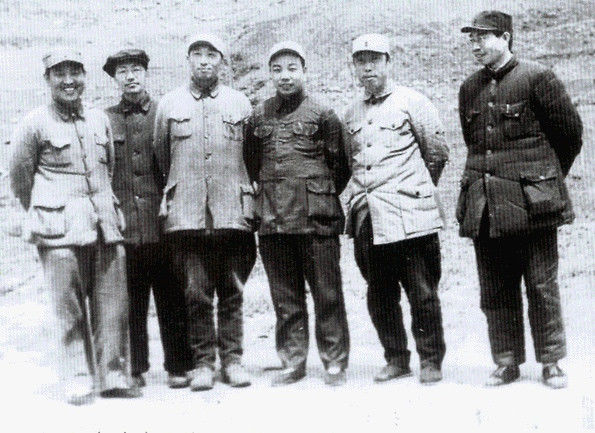
Jiang Hua (first on the left) with other revolutionaries in 1946

In August 1945, after the end of the war against Japan, Jiang went to Liaodong, where he served as deputy secretary of the Andong work committee and second secretary of the Liaodong provincial committee. He also headed the organisation and social affairs departments of the party's Liaodong Bureau. In May 1948, he became party secretary of Andong Province and political commissar of the Andong military region.

== Politcal career ==
In May 1949, Jiang left the Northeast for the south, and in June 1949 he was added to the CCP Zhejiang Provincial Committee. On 29 August 1949, he was appointed party secretary and mayor of Hangzhou. He became deputy secretary of the Zhejiang Provincial Committee in July 1951, took charge of the committee's work in May 1954, and was appointed party secretary of Zhejiang in August 1954. He also served as political commissar of the Zhejiang Military District, chairman of the Zhejiang committee of the Chinese People's Political Consultative Conference, a secretary of the party's East China Bureau and political commissar of the Nanjing Military Region. He was an alternate member of the 8th and 10th Central Committees of the CCP, and later became a full member. His tenure of about 14 years as party leader of Zhejiang, which formally ended in 1968, was the longest of anyone in that post since 1949.

During the Cultural Revolution, Jiang's wife, Wu Zhonglian, died on 19 January 1967 after being persecuted. On 11 February 1967, with Mao's approval, Zhou Enlai sent a plane to bring Jiang to Beijing for his protection. In October 1969, he was evacuated from Beijing under a war-readiness order. From late 1969 until 1972, he was assigned to Plant 238 in Hubei, where he used the temporary name Jiang Zhi.

=== Supreme People's Court ===
On 20 January 1975, Jiang was appointed President of the Supreme People's Court. The legal scholar Susan Finder writes that when he took office, at the end of the Cultural Revolution, party leaders told him that what mattered most was a good grasp of party policy. Finder cites this as an example of how serving the party centre and enforcing party policy were long the basic principles of the court's work. A collection of his writings on judicial work was published in 1989.

On 29 September 1980, Jiang was also appointed presiding judge of the special court set up to try the leaders of the Lin Biao and Jiang Qing cliques. The court tried ten defendants, including the four members of the Gang of Four, in public hearings from 20 November 1980 to 25 January 1981, when it announced its verdicts. In his report on the trial to the Standing Committee of the National People's Congress on 3 March 1981, Jiang said that the court had held 42 sessions, examined 873 pieces of evidence and heard 49 victims and witnesses. He also reported that more than 60,000 people had attended the hearings as observers, and recommended that the special court be dissolved now that its work was complete. He signed the report as both president of the Supreme People's Court and presiding judge of the special court.

== Later life and death ==
In 1982, Jiang was elected a member of the Standing Committee of the Central Advisory Commission. He was a delegate to the 7th, 12th and 14th National Congresses of the CCP, and a specially invited delegate to the 15th Congress. He died in Hangzhou on 24 December 1999, at the age of 93.

Military offices
Preceded by Tan Qilong	Political Commissar of the Zhejiang Military District; 1954–1967	Succeeded by Nan Ping
Party political offices
Preceded by Tan Qilong	Secretary of the CCP Zhejiang Committee; 1954–1967	Succeeded by Long Qian
Assembly seats
Preceded by Tan Qilong	Chairman of CPPCC Zhejiang Committee; 1955–1967	Succeeded by Tie Ying
Legal offices
Preceded by Yang Xiufeng	President of the Supreme People's Court; 1975–1983	Succeeded by Zheng Tianxiang
