= Lü Zushan =

- 吕祖善

Governor of Zhejiang
- In office January 2003 – August 2011
- Preceded by: Xi Jinping
- Succeeded by: Xia Baolong

Personal details
- Born: November 1946 (age 79) Hangzhou, Zhejiang
- Party: Chinese Communist Party
- Education: Nanjing Aeronautical Institute; Central Party School

Chinese name
- Traditional Chinese: 呂祖善
- Simplified Chinese: 吕祖善
Transcriptions
Standard Mandarin
- Hanyu Pinyin: Lǚ Zǔshàn

Lü Zushan (born November 1946) is a politician of the People's Republic of China. He succeeded Xi Jinping as Governor of Zhejiang province in 2003. After retiring from provincial leadership in 2011, he has served as Vice-Chairman of the Financial and Economic Committee of the National People's Congress.

== Early life and career ==
Lü was born in November 1946 in Hangzhou, the capital of Zhejiang province. In 1963 he entered the Nanjing Aeronautical Institute (now Nanjing University of Aeronautics and Astronautics), and joined the Chinese Communist Party (CCP) in March 1966.

After graduating from university in 1968 during the Cultural Revolution, Lü was sent to do manual labor on a People's Liberation Army farm until 1970, before becoming a technician at the Shaoyang Water Generator Plant in Shaoyang, Hunan province. Later he returned to Zhejiang and worked for the Zhejiang Automobile Industry Company, first as a technician and later as a manager. He then worked for the Machinery Department of the Zhejiang provincial government, first as an engineer, and later becoming deputy director and then director of the department.

== Provincial leadership ==
In 1995, Lü became a member of the Standing Committee of the CCP Zhejiang Provincial Committee. In January 1998, he became Executive Vice-Governor of Zhejiang, and CCP Deputy Committee Secretary of the province.

In January 2003, the Zhejiang People's Congress elected Lü Zushan as Governor of Zhejiang, replacing Xi Jinping who became the Communist Party Secretary of Zhejiang. He served under Xi, who later became General Secretary of the Chinese Communist Party, during Xi's five-year term as the provincial party committee secretary, and retired as governor in 2011 when he reached 65, the mandatory retirement age for provincial party secretaries and governors. After serving as governor, Lü was appointed Vice-Chairman of the Financial and Economic Committee of the National People's Congress.

Lü was an alternate of the 16th Central Committee of the Chinese Communist Party and a full member of the 17th Central Committee. Like many other provincial governors, he holds a master's degree in engineering from the Central Party School of the Chinese Communist Party.

Political offices
Preceded by Xi Jinping	Governor of Zhejiang; January 2003 – August 2011	Succeeded by Xia Baolong
