= Zhu Congjiu =

Chinese politician

- 朱从玖
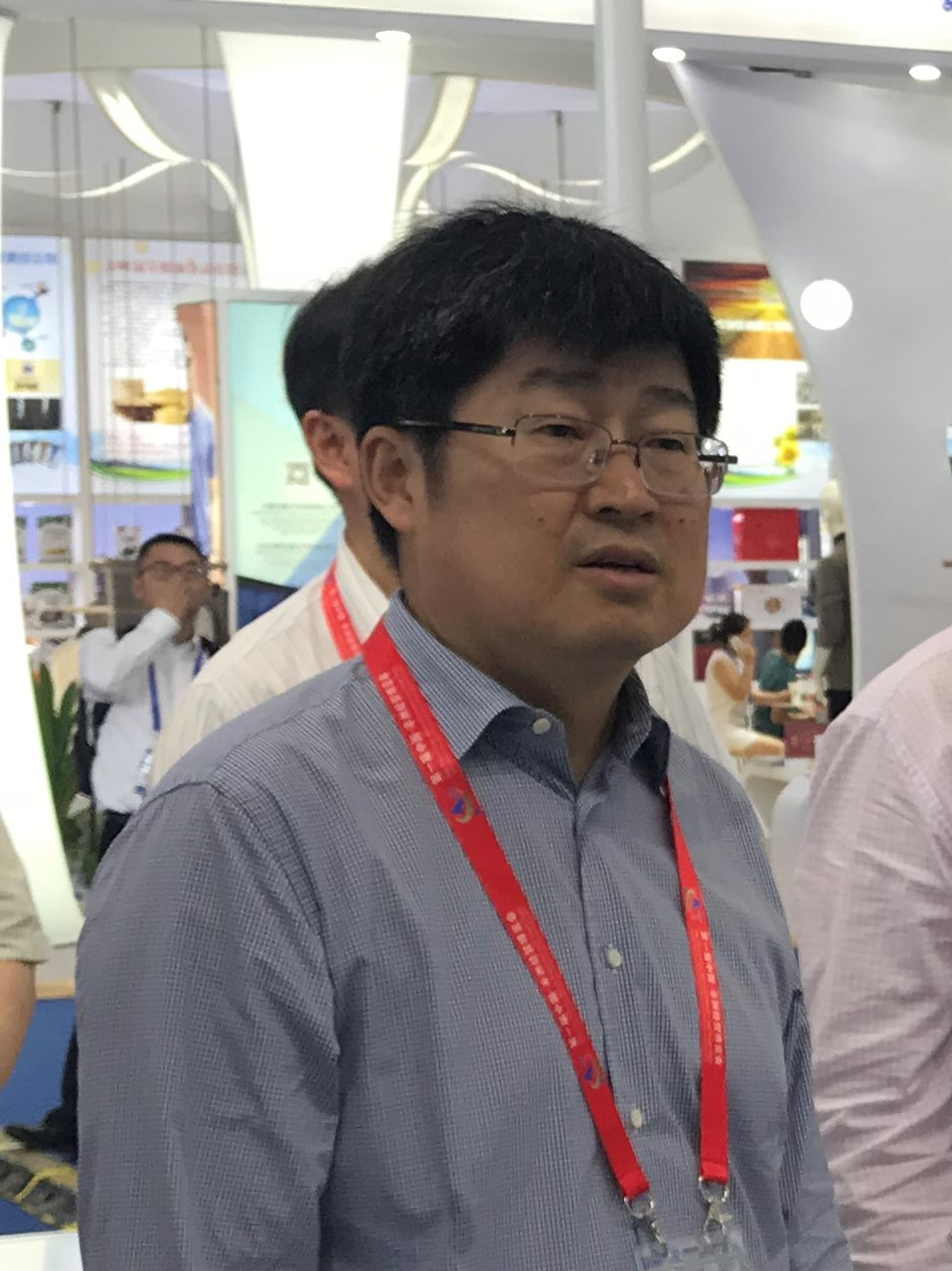
- Zhu Congjiu in CAETE.

Vice Chairman of the Zhejiang Provincial Committee of the Chinese People's Political Consultative Conference
- In office January 2023 – May 2023
- Chairwoman: Huang Lixin

Personal details
- Born: March 1965 (age 61) Feixi County, Anhui, China
- Party: Chinese Communist Party (1985–2023; expelled)
- Education: Anhui University of Finance and Economics; Central Party School of the Chinese Communist Party

Chinese name
- Simplified Chinese: 朱从玖
- Traditional Chinese: 朱從玖
Transcriptions
Standard Mandarin
- Hanyu Pinyin: Zhū Cóngjiǔ

Zhu Congjiu (Chinese: 朱从玖; born March 1965) is a former Chinese financial executive and politician. As of November 2024, he has been sentenced to life imprisonment for accepting bribes. Previously he served as vice chairman of the Zhejiang Provincial Committee of the Chinese People's Political Consultative Conference and before that, vice governor of Zhejiang.

He was a member of the 10th and 11th National Committee of the Chinese People's Political Consultative Conference.

== Early life and education ==
Zhu was born in Feixi County, Anhui, in March 1965. In 1981, he was accepted to Anhui Institute of Finance and Trade (now Anhui University of Finance and Economics), where he majored in finance. He joined the Chinese Communist Party (CCP) in July 1985 upon graduating, and did his postgraduate work at the Graduate Department of the People's Bank of China and worked in its Financial Management Department beginning in August 1988.

== Career ==
Zhu was assigned to the China Securities Regulatory Commission in November 1992. In April 1999, he became deputy general manager and deputy party secretary of Shanghai Stock Exchange, rising to general manager and party secretary the next year. In January 2008, he was appointed assistant to the chairman of the China Securities Regulatory Commission and served as director of its Issuance Supervision Department.

In May 2012, Zhu was made vice governor of Zhejiang, a position he held for more than ten years. He was transferred to the Zhejiang Provincial Committee of the Chinese People's Political Consultative Conference, the provincial advisory body, in July 2022, and took the position of vice chairman in January 2023.

== Investigation ==
On 4 May 2023, he was suspected of "serious violations of laws and regulations" by the Central Commission for Discipline Inspection (CCDI), the party's internal disciplinary body, and the National Supervisory Commission, the highest anti-corruption agency of China. His classmates at the Graduate Department of the People's Bank of China, including Liu Liange (Chairman of Bank of China), Zhang Yujun (Assistant to the Chairman of the China Securities Regulatory Commission), Dai Zhikang (Chairman of Zendai Investment Group), and Luo Xi (Chairman of China PICC Group), were also sacked or removed from public office for graft. On November 7, he was expelled from the CCP and removed from public office. On November 14, he was arrested on suspicion of accepting bribes by the Supreme People's Procuratorate.

On 9 November 2024, Zhu was sentenced to life imprisonment, deprived of political rights for life, and had all his personal property confiscated.

Government offices
Preceded by Tu Guangshao	General Manager of Shanghai Stock Exchange; 2000–2008	Succeeded by Zhang Yujun
