= Wang Huizhong =

Chinese politician

Wang Huizhong (Chinese: 王辉忠; born February 1956) is a Chinese politician from Zhejiang province. He has served as the Deputy Communist Party Secretary of Zhejiang from 2013 to 2016.

Wang was born in Yiwu, Zhejiang province. He joined the Chinese Communist Party in May 1978. He first worked in a commune. He attended Zhejiang A & F University beginning in 1980, then returned to Yiwu County. In March 1993, he was named head of the Communist Youth League organization in Zhejiang province. In October 1995, he was transferred to Zhoushan to work as deputy party chief and Organization Department chief. In May 1997, he was named mayor of Zhoushan. In March 1999 he was promoted to party chief of Zhoushan. In February 2003, he was named head of the Zhejiang police force; by May 2003, he was a member of the provincial Party Standing Committee. In June 2007, he became head of the provincial Political and Legal Affairs Department. In 2010, he became party chief of Ningbo.

In April 2013, Wang was named deputy party chief of Zhejiang; he was then named in May as the head of the Political and Legal Affairs Commission of Zhejiang. In January 2016, Wang, then nearing 60, became Vice-Chair of the Zhejiang People's Congress. He retired at the age of 61 in January 2018.

Wang is an alternate member of the 18th Central Committee of the Chinese Communist Party.

Party political offices
Preceded by Li Qiang	Deputy Communist Party Secretary of Zhejiang; 2013–2016	Succeeded by Yuan Jiajun
Preceded by Bayanqolu	Communist Party Secretary of Ningbo; 2010–2013	Succeeded by Liu Qi
Civic offices
Preceded by Shen Yueyue	Communist Youth League Secretary of Zhejiang; 1993–1995	Succeeded by Lou Yangsheng
