= Zhou Jianren =

Chinese politician and biologist (1888–1984)

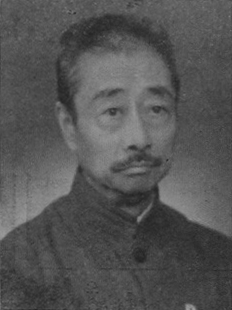
Zhou Jianren

Zhou Jianren (Chinese: 周建人; 1888–1984) was a Chinese politician and biologist, and the younger brother of Lu Xun and Zhou Zuoren.

== Career ==
Zhou advocated the use of birth control as a way to alleviate overpopulation.

In 1947, Zhou translated Charles Darwin's On the Origin of Species into Chinese.

Zhou represented Zhejiang in the inaugural National People's Congress in 1954, serving as a member of the body's standing committee. He became governor of Zhejiang in 1958 and held the position until the beginning of the Cultural Revolution in 1966.

When the office of the Chairman of the Standing Committee of the National People's Congress, by then the head of state of the People's Republic of China, fell vacant in 1976, Zhou was one of the 20 vice chairmen who administered the position. He also served as the chairman of China Association for Promoting Democracy. He was a member of the 10th and 11th Central Committees of the Chinese Communist Party.

Political offices
Preceded by Huo Shilian	Governor of Zhejiang; 1958–1966	Succeeded by Long Qian
