= Zhejiang Provincial Committee of the Chinese Communist Party =

Zhejiang Provincial Committee of the Chinese Communist Party 中国共产党浙江省委员会

Overview
- Type: Highest decision-making organ when Zhejiang Provincial Congress is not in session.
- Elected by: Zhejiang Provincial Congress
- Length of term: Five years
- Term limits: None
- First convocation: May–June 1927
- Secretary: Wang Hao
- Deputy Secretary: Liu Jie (Acting Governor)
- Secretary-General: Qiu Qiwen
- Executive organ: Standing Committee
- Inspection organ: Commission for Discipline Inspection

Zhejiang Provincial Committee of the Chinese Communist Party
- Simplified Chinese: 中国共产党浙江省委员会
- Traditional Chinese: 中國共產黨浙江省委員會
Transcriptions
Standard Mandarin
- Hanyu Pinyin: Zhōngguó Gòngchǎndǎng Zhèjiāngshěng Wěiyuánhuì

Abbreviation
- Chinese: 中共浙江省委
- Literal meaning: CCP Zhejiang Provincial Committee
Transcriptions
Standard Mandarin
- Hanyu Pinyin: Zhōnggòng Zhèjiāngshěng Wěi

The Zhejiang Provincial Committee of the Chinese Communist Party is the provincial committee of the Chinese Communist Party (CCP) in Zhejiang. The CCP committee secretary is the highest ranking post in the province. The current secretary is Wang Hao, who succeeded Yi Lianhong on 28 October 2024.

== History ==
In September 1922, the CCP Hangzhou Group, the first CCP organization in Zhejiang, was established. Afterwards, more party organizations in Zhejiang were gradually established. In June 1927, the Zhejiang Provincial Committee was established. In April 1929, after the outbreak of the Chinese Civil War with the Kuomintang, the CCP decided to temporarily abolish the Provincial Committee.

In late 1936, due to tensions with Japan, the Kuomintang and CCP temporarily stopped fighting and declared a Second United Front; the Second Sino-Japanese War broke out later in July 1937. In May 1938, the Zhejiang Provisional Provincial Committee was established and turned into an official Provincial Committee by September, with Liu Ying as secretary. In 1939, the Provincial Committee held the first Provincial Party Congress in Pingyang County. In February 1942, Liu Ying was arrested and died later in May, leading to the breakdown of the party committee.

In 1945, the war with Japan ended in a Chinese victory, leading to the restart of the Civil War in 1946. On 3 May 1949, the People's Liberation Army (PLA) entered Hangzhou. Three days later on 6 May, the Provincial Party Committee was re-established. By February 1955, all of Zhejiang was under CCP control. Zhejiang held its Second Provincial Party Congress in 1956.

== Organization ==
The organization of the Zhejiang Provincial Committee includes:

- General Office

=== Functional Departments ===
- Organization Department
- Publicity Department
- United Front Work Department
- Political and Legal Affairs Commission

=== Offices ===
- Policy Research Office
- Office of the Comprehensive Deepening Reforms Commission
- Office of the Cyberspace Affairs Commission
- Office of the Institutional Organization Commission
- Office of the Military-civilian Fusion Development Committee
- Taiwan Work Office
- Letters and Calls Bureau
- Office of the Leading Group for Inspection Work
- Bureau of Veteran Cadres

=== Dispatched institutions ===
- Working Committee of the Organs Directly Affiliated to the Zhejiang Provincial Committee

=== Organizations directly under the Committee ===
- Zhejiang Party School
- Zhejiang Daily Press Group
- Zhejiang Institute of Socialism
- Party History Research Office
- Zhejiang Provincial Archives

== Leadership ==
=== Party Committees ===
14th Provincial Party Committee (June 2017–June 2022)

- Secretary: Che Jun (until 31 August 2020), Yuan Jiajun (from 31 August 2020)
- Deputy Secretaries: Yuan Jiajun (until 31 August 2020), Tang Yijun (until October 2017), Zheng Shanjie (May 2018–September 2021), Huang Jianfa (from June 2021), Wang Hao (from September 2021)
- Other Standing Committee members: Ge Huijun (until May 2018), Zhao Yide (until March 2018), Liu Jianchao (until April 2018), Ren Zhenhe (until July 2019), Chen Jinbiao, Xu Jiaai (until September 2017), Feng Fei (until December 2020), Zhou Jiangyong (until August 2021, put under investigation), Feng Zhili (until July 2017), Xiong Jianping (November 2017–June 2021), Wang Changrong (from December 2017), Zheng Shanjie (December 2017–September 2021), Wang Xinhai (February–May 2018), Huang Jianfa (from July 2018), Zhu Guoxian (October 2018–November 2021), Feng Wenping (January 2019–June 2021), Chen Weijun (July 2019–June 2021), Xu Luode (from September 2019), Peng Jiaxue (from January 2021), Chen Yijun (from April 2021), Xiu Changzhi (from June 2021), Liu Xiaotao (from August 2021), Liu Jie (from December 2021), Wang Cheng (from March 2022) Wang Gang (from April 2022), Qiu Qiwen (from May 2022)

15th Provincial Party Committee (June 2022–)

- Secretary: Yuan Jiajun (until 7 December 2022), Yi Lianhong (7 December 2022 – 28 October 2024), Wang Hao (since 28 October 2024)
- Deputy Secretaries: Wang Hao, Huang Jianfa (until March 2023), Liu Jie (from October 2023)
- Other Standing Committee members: Xu Luode (until October 2022), Peng Jiaxue, Wang Cheng, Chen Yijun (until May 2023), Liu Xiaotao (until October 2023), Xu Wenguang, Qiu Qiwen, Wang Gang (until April 2023), Fu Mingxian (from October 2022), Xia Junyou (October 2022–January 2024), Wang Chengguo (from April 2023), Zhao Cheng (from June 2023), Wang Wenxu (from November 2023), Sun Wenju (from January 2024)

== See also ==
- Politics of Zhejiang
