= Chen Anyu =

Chinese politician

Chen Anyu (1922 – January 7, 2015) was a Chinese politician.

Chen was born in Dinghai District, Zhoushan, Zhejiang. He was a delegate to the 6th National People's Congress and 7th National People's Congress. He was chairman of the People's Congress of his home province.

Preceded by Li Fengping	Chairman of the Zhejiang People's Congress; 1988–1993	Succeeded by Li Zemin
