= Chai Songyue =

Chinese politician

Chai Songyue (Chinese: 柴松岳; November 1941) is a politician of the People's Republic of China.

Born in Putuo, Zhejiang Province, Chai joined the Chinese Communist Party in September 1961. He was appointed acting governor of Zhejiang in April 1997, and was confirmed as governor in January 1998. He served this post until October 2002.

Chai was an alternate member of 14th Central Committee of the Chinese Communist Party, and a full member of 15th and 16th Central Committees of CPC.

Political offices
Preceded by Wan Xueyuan	Governor of Zhejiang; 1997–2002	Succeeded by Xi Jinping
