= Lin Feng (politician) =

Chinese politician (1906–1977)

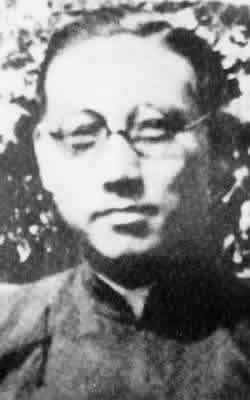
Lin Feng (politician)

Lin Feng (Chinese: 林枫; September 30, 1906 – September 29, 1977) was a Chinese politician who served as the vice chairperson of the Standing Committee of the National People's Congress.
