= Long Qian =

Long Qian (Chinese: 龙潜) (1913–1992) other names Long Qiunian (Chinese: 龙秋年), Long Zhong (Chinese: 龙中) and Long Youming (Chinese: 龙友明), was a People's Liberation Army major general and People's Republic of China politician. He was born in Yongxin County, Jiangxi Province. He was a member of the Chinese Workers' and Peasants' Red Army and the New Fourth Army. He was a member of the standing committee of the Chinese Communist Party Zhejiang Party Committee and governor of Zhejiang Province.

Preceded by Jiang Hua	Communist Party Chief of Zhejiang; 1967	Succeeded by Nan Ping
Preceded by Zhou Jianren	Governor of Zhejiang; 1966	Succeeded by Nan Ping
