= Yang Shande =

Chinese politician

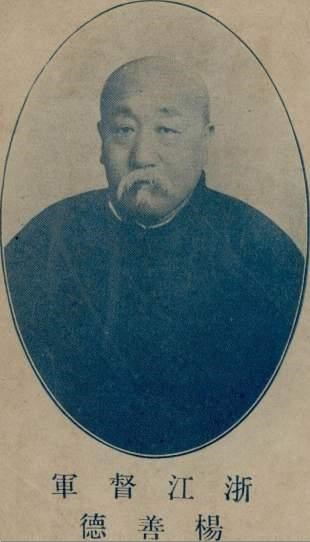
Yang Shande

Yang Shande (Chinese: 杨善德) (1873 – August 13, 1919) was a Chinese politician of the late Qing Dynasty and early Republican period. He supported Yuan Shikai's restoration of the monarchy and was made a count under the Empire of China (1915–1916).
