= Tan Qilong =

Chinese politician

- 谭启龙

Party Secretary of Sichuan
- In office March 1980 – February 1983
- Preceded by: Zhao Ziyang
- Succeeded by: Yang Rudai

Party Secretary of Qinghai
- In office 1977–1979
- Preceded by: Liu Xianquan
- Succeeded by: Liang Buting

Party Secretary of Zhejiang
- In office May 1973 – February 1977
- Preceded by: Nan Ping
- Succeeded by: Tie Ying
- In office September 1952 – August 1954
- Preceded by: Tan Zhenlin
- Succeeded by: Jiang Hua

Party Secretary of Shandong
- In office March 1961 – February 1967
- Preceded by: Zeng Xisheng
- Succeeded by: Wang Xiaoyu

Personal details
- Born: January 3, 1913 Yongxin County, Jiangxi, China
- Died: January 22, 2003 (aged 90) Jinan, Shandong, China
- Party: Chinese Communist Party
- Spouse: Yan Yongjie (严永洁)

Tan Qilong (Chinese: 谭启龙; 3 January 1913 – 22 January 2003) was a politician in the People's Republic of China. Over his long career, he served as the Communist Party Chief, and the top government official, of four different provinces: Zhejiang (twice), Shandong, Qinghai, and Sichuan. He also served as Governor of Zhejiang, Shandong, and Qinghai.

Tan was born in Yongxin County, Jiangxi province on 3 January 1913 and joined the Chinese Communist Party in 1933. He was persecuted during the Cultural Revolution but was rehabilitated in 1970 and served in Fujian province. He died on 22 January 2003 in Jinan, Shandong.

Military offices
Preceded by Tan Zhenlin	Political Commissar of the Zhejiang Military District; 1952–1954	Succeeded by Jiang Hua
