= Wu Guohua =

Chinese politician (born 1961)

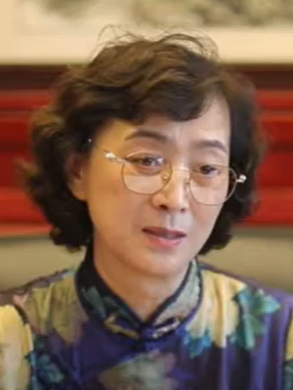
Wu Guohua

Wu Guohua (吴国华; born September 1961) is a Chinese politician and a current vice-chair of the central committee of the Taiwan Democratic Self-Government League (TDSL), one of China's eight minor political parties that follow the direction of the Chinese Communist Party.

Wu was born in Fujin, Heilongjiang, but has ancestry in Miaoli County, Taiwan. She previously joined the Chinese Peasants' and Workers' Democratic Party, another minor party, in 1989, before joining the TDSL in 2007. She has been a member of the National Committee of the Chinese People's Political Consultative Conference since 2013, and a vice chair of the TDSL since December 2017. Wu also previously held multiple local political roles in Heilongjiang.
