= Ge Huijun =

Chinese politician

- 葛慧君

Chairwoman of the Shandong Provincial Committee of the Chinese People's Political Consultative Conference
- Incumbent
- Assumed office 26 January 2022
- Preceded by: Fu Zhifang

Chairwoman of the Zhejiang Provincial Committee of the Chinese People's Political Consultative Conference
- In office 29 January 2018 – 10 January 2022
- Preceded by: Qiao Chuanxiu
- Succeeded by: Huang Lixin

Personal details
- Born: March 1963 (age 63) Zhuji County, Zhejiang, China
- Party: Chinese Communist Party
- Education: Shaoxing University; Central Party School of the Chinese Communist Party

Ge Huijun (Chinese: 葛慧君; pinyin: Gě Huìjūn; born March 1963) is a Chinese politician who served as chairwoman of the Zhejiang Provincial Committee of the Chinese People's Political Consultative Conference. She is a member of the 13th National Committee of the Chinese People's Political Consultative Conference. She was an alternate of the 18th and 19th Central Committee of the Chinese Communist Party.

== Biography ==
Ge was born in the town of Fengqiao, Zhuji County, Zhejiang, in March 1963. She graduated from Shaoxing Normal School (now Shaoxing University). From August 1983 to September 2003, she worked in the Communist Youth League. After a short period of working in Ningbo, she was named acting mayor of Jinhua in March 2005 and was installed as mayor in the following month. She was appointed vice governor of Zhejiang in July 2007 and was admitted to member of the standing committee of the CCP Zhejiang Provincial Committee, the province's top authority. In July 2012, she was appointed head of Publicity Department of Zhejiang Provincial Committee of the Chinese Communist Party, succeeding Mao Linsheng. In January 2018, she became chairwoman of the Zhejiang Provincial Committee of the Chinese People's Political Consultative Conference, the province's top political advisory body.

Civic offices
| Preceded by Lou Yangsheng | Secretary of Zhejiang Provincial Committee of the Communist Youth League of China; 2000–2003 | Succeeded by Zhao Yide |
Government offices
| Preceded by Xu Zhiping (徐止平) | Mayor of Jinhua; 2005–2007 | Succeeded by Chen Kunzhong |
Party political offices
| Preceded by Mao Linsheng | Head of Publicity Department of Zhejiang Provincial Committee of the Chinese Communist Party; 2012–2018 | Succeeded by Zhu Guoxian |
Party political offices
| Preceded by Qiao Chuanxiu | Chairwoman of the Zhejiang Provincial Committee of the Chinese People's Political Consultative Conference; 2018–2022 | Succeeded by Huang Lixin |
| Preceded by Fu Zhifang | Chairwoman of the Shandong Provincial Committee of the Chinese People's Political Consultative Conference; 2022–present | Incumbent |
