= He Xiehou =

Chinese educator and politician

- Traditional Chinese: 何燮侯
Transcriptions
Standard Mandarin
- Hanyu Pinyin: Hé Xièhóu

He Xiehou (1873-1961) was a Chinese educator, politician and former President of Peking University.

== Biography ==
He's another name was He Yushi (何燏时), courtesy name was Zixing (字行), and was born in Zhuji, Shaoxing, Zhejiang Province in 1873. When he was 19 years old, he went to Hangzhou and in 1897 studied at Qiushi Academy (current Zhejiang University).

In 1898, He went to Japan, as one of China's first students to Japan. In 1902, He graduated from Tokyo First Advanced School (Japanese: 第一高等学校). In 1907, He graduated from the Department of Metallurgy of Tokyo Imperial University (current University of Tokyo). He is the first Chinese student who graduated from a Japanese university.

In spring 1908, He went back to Zhejiang and served as a technician in the Bureau of Mining of Zhejiang Provincial Government. In 1909, he went to Japan again. He was the supervisor of the engineering faculty of the Imperial Capital University (京师大学堂; current Peking University) in Beijing.

In 1911/1912, the Qing Dynasty ended, and the Imperial Capital University was renamed as (National) Peking University. He was the first President of Peking University from then on.

In 1914, he visited South Asia.

In 1954, he was elected the head of the Revolutionary Committee of the Kuomintang Zhejiang Branch.

In 1961, he died in Hangzhou. His tomb is in Shaoxing, his hometown. Many people still visit there today.
