= Qu Yingguang =

Chinese revolutionary (1883–1973)

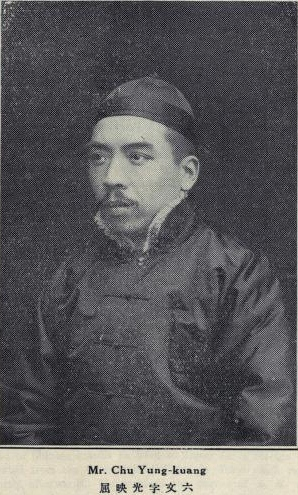

Qu Yingguang (Chinese: 屈映光; March 14, 1883 – September 19, 1973), courtesy name Wenliu (Chinese: 文六), was a Chinese politician active during the Republican period. Qu was born in Taizhou, Zhejiang province. A member of the Guangfuhui, Qu took the bringing the Xinhai Revolution to his native province, and took part in provincial politics shortly after. He supported Yuan Shikai's restoration of the monarchy and the Empire of China (1915–1916). After Yuan's death in 1916, he joined the Anhui clique and served in the Beiyang government. After the defeat the Anhui clique in the Zhili–Anhui War of 1920, Qu returned to his native Zhejiang. With the establishment of the People's Republic of China, Qu left the mainland for Taiwan, devoting the rest of his life to Buddhism. He died in Taiwan at the age of 90.

== See also ==
- Qu (surname 屈)
