= Wang Hao (politician, born 1963) =

Chinese politician

Wang Hao 王浩

Party Secretary of Zhejiang
- Incumbent
- Assumed office October 28, 2024
- Deputy: Liu Jie (Governor)
- Preceded by: Yi Lianhong

Chairman of the Zhejiang Provincial People's Congress
- Incumbent
- Assumed office January 17, 2025
- Preceded by: Yi Lianhong

Governor of Zhejiang
- In office September 30, 2021 – December 18, 2024
- Deputy: Xu Wenguang and others
- Preceded by: Zheng shanjie
- Succeeded by: Liu Jie

Party Secretary of Xi'an
- In office September 3, 2019 – September 30, 2021
- Deputy: Li Mingyuan (Mayor)
- Preceded by: Wang Yongkang
- Succeeded by: Fang Hongwei

Party Secretary of Tangshan
- In office December 21, 2017 – September 3, 2019
- Deputy: Ding Xiufeng (Mayor)
- Preceded by: Jiao Yanlong
- Succeeded by: Zhang Gujiang

Party Secretary of Yantai
- In office May 4, 2017 – December 21, 2017
- Deputy: Zhang Yongxia (Mayor)
- Preceded by: Meng Fanli
- Succeeded by: Zhang Shuping

Party Secretary of Zibo
- In office February 8, 2015 – May 4, 2017
- Deputy: Zhou Lianhua (Mayor)
- Preceded by: Zhou Qingli
- Succeeded by: Zhou Lianhua

Director of the Shandong Provincial Department of Civil Affairs
- In office March 28, 2014 – February 8, 2015
- Governor: Guo Shuqing
- Preceded by: Sun Jiangong
- Succeeded by: Chen Xianyun

Personal details
- Born: October 1963 (age 62) Shan County, Heze, Shandong Province
- Party: Chinese Communist Party
- Education: Bachelor’s degree in Political Science, Heze University; Correspondence undergraduate program in Economic Management, Party School of the CCP Shandong Provincial Committee

Wang Hao (Chinese: 王浩; pinyin: Wáng Hào; born October 1963) is a Chinese politician who is the current Party Secretary of Zhejiang. Wang entered the workforce in July 1982, and joined the Chinese Communist Party in January 1984.

== Biography ==
Wang was born in Shan County, Shandong, in October 1963. In October 1980, Wang was accepted to Heze Normal College, where he majored in politics.

From July 1982 to September 2012, he assumed various posts in his home-county and home-city, including head of the Publicity Department of the CCP Cao County Committee and a member of the Standing Committee of CCP Cao County Committee, and Deputy Party Secretary. From December 2010 to September 2012, he served as Deputy Party Secretary of Binzhou for a short time. In September 2012, he was promoted to Deputy Secretary-General of CCP Shandong Provincial Committee and head of Shandong Provincial Letters and Complaints Bureau. He was head of Shandong Provincial Bureau of Civil Affairs in March 2014, a position he held until February 2015, when he was transferred to Zibo and was promoted again to become Party Secretary and chairman of the Standing Committee of its Municipal People's Congress. Two years later, Wang was transferred again to Yantai and appointed Party Secretary there.

Wang was Party Secretary of Tangshan and a member of the Standing Committee of CCP Hebei Provincial Committee in December 2017, and held that offices until August 2019.

On September 3, 2019, Wang was appointed Party Secretary of Xi'an, Shaanxi province, after 190 days vacancy of that position.

On September 30, 2021, he was transferred to north China's Zhejiang province and appointed acting governor.

He was a delegate to the 19th National Congress of the Chinese Communist Party.

On October 22, 2022, Wang was elected to the 20th Central Committee of the Communist Party.

On 28 October 2024, Wang was appointed Zhejiang Provincial Committee of the Chinese Communist Party, succeeding Yi Lianhong.

Government offices
Preceded by Sun Jiangong	Head of Shandong Provincial Department of Civil Affairs; 2014–2015	Succeeded by Chen Xianyun
Preceded by Zheng Shanjie	Governor of Zhejiang; 2021–2024	Succeeded by Liu Jie (acting)
Party political offices
Preceded by Zhou Qingli (周清利)	Party Secretary of Zibo; 2015–2017	Succeeded by Zhou Lianhua (周连华)
Preceded by Meng Fanli (孟凡利)	Party Secretary of Yantai; 2017–2017	Succeeded by Zhang Shuping (张术平)
Preceded by Jiao Yanlong (焦彦龙)	Party Secretary of Tangshan; 2017–2019	Succeeded by Zhang Gujiang
Preceded by Wang Yongkang	Party Secretary of Xi'an; 2019–2021	Succeeded by Fang Hongwei
Preceded by Yi Lianhong	Party Secretary of Zhejiang; 2024–present	Incumbent
Assembly seats
Preceded by Yi Lianhong	Chairperson of the Zhejiang Provincial People's Congress; 2025–present	Incumbent
