= Nan Ping =

Chinese politician

Nan Ping (Chinese: 南萍) (1918–1989) was a People's Republic of China politician and People's Liberation Army major general. He was born in Changshan County, Zibo, Shandong Province. He was Chinese Communist Party Committee Secretary of Zhejiang Province (1973) as well as governor of Zhejiang.

== Bibliography ==
- 汪东兴. 《汪东兴回忆: 毛泽东与林彪反革命集团的斗争》. 当代中国出版社. 1997年: 145–150页. ISBN 9787800926068.

Military offices
Preceded by Jiang Hua	Political Commissar of the Zhejiang Military District; 1967–1972	Succeeded by Tan Qilong
Party political offices
Preceded by Long Qian	Communist Party Chief of Zhejiang; 1973	Succeeded by Tan Qilong
