= Yuan Jiajun =

Chinese aerospace engineer and politician (born 1962)

- 袁家军
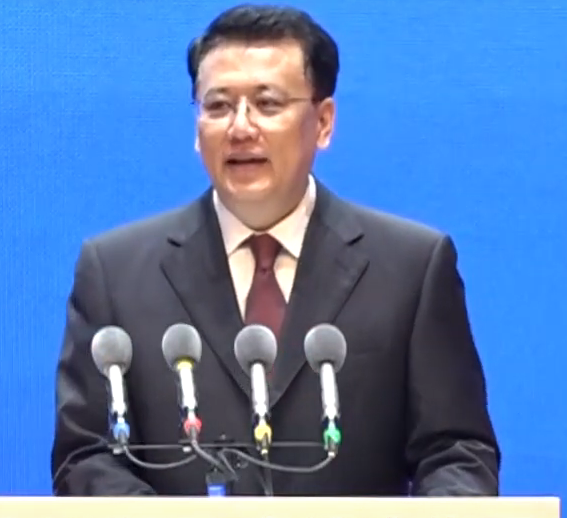
- Yuan in 2019

Party Secretary of Chongqing
- Incumbent
- Assumed office 8 December 2022
- Deputy: Hu Henghua (Mayor)
- Preceded by: Chen Min'er

Party Secretary of Zhejiang
- In office 1 September 2020 – 7 December 2022
- Deputy: Zheng Shanjie → Wang Hao (Governor)
- Preceded by: Che Jun
- Succeeded by: Yi Lianhong

Governor of Zhejiang
- In office 28 April 2017 – 4 September 2020
- Preceded by: Che Jun
- Succeeded by: Zheng Shanjie

Personal details
- Born: 27 September 1962 (age 64) Tonghua, Jilin, China
- Party: Chinese Communist Party
- Education: Beijing Institute of Aeronautics and Astronautics

Chinese name
- Simplified Chinese: 袁家军
- Traditional Chinese: 袁家軍
Transcriptions
Standard Mandarin
- Hanyu Pinyin: Yuán Jiājūn

Yuan Jiajun (Chinese: 袁家军; born 27 September 1962) is a Chinese politician and aerospace engineer. He is the Party Secretary of Chongqing and a member of the Politburo of the Chinese Communist Party (CCP).

Before entering politics, Yuan was best known for his role as chief designer of the Shenzhou spacecraft, which carries Chinese taikonauts into space. He also served as the governor of Zhejiang from 2017 to 2020 and the Party Secretary of Zhejiang from 2020 to 2022.

== Early life and education ==
Yuan was born in Tonghua, Jilin in September 1962. From 1980 to 1984, Yuan studied at Beijing Institute of Aeronautics and Astronautics, majoring in aircraft design and applied mechanics. After graduating in July 1984, he joined the 501 Office of the Fifth Institute of the Ministry of Aerospace Industry, also known as the China Academy of Space Technology, as a researcher in aircraft design. He later obtained a master's degree at institute.

== Aerospace career ==
Yuan ascended the ranks and became the office's deputy director in August 1994. Less than a year in the position, he was promoted to assistant director of the Fifth Institute.

At 33, Yuan was appointed by Qi Faren, then the institute's director, as the deputy commander of the Shenzhou 1 mission responsible for spacecraft systems, despite his background in satellites. He also oversaw the development of the construction of the Beijing Aerospace City.

In April 2000, he was named commander of the Shenzhou crewed spaceflight program. During his command, Shenzhou spaceships were launched successfully. Until 2003, he headed the Shenzhou 2 to 5 missions. Then, he gained a doctorate from his alma mater, now renamed Beihang University. Yuan became vice-president of the China Aerospace Science and Technology Corporation in November 2007, and became involved in the Lunar Mission and the joint Chinese-Russian mission to explore Mars. Yuan has received numerous awards for his work in the Chinese Space Program.

== Political career ==
He became involved in politics in 2012, joining the party standing committee in Ningxia, and becoming vice chairman of Ningxia in 2013, and overseeing the operations of the Ningdong Energy and Chemical Operations Industry Base (宁东能源化工基地).

Yuan was an alternate of the 17th Central Committee of the Chinese Communist Party, and a full member of the 19th Central Committee.

=== Zhejiang ===
In August 2014, Yuan was named a party standing committee member of Zhejiang. He was then appointed executive vice-governor who is responsible for energy, policing, religious policy, taxation and national security. He also became the contact person for the provincial People's Liberation Army and People's Armed Police. In November 2016, Yuan was named deputy party chief of Zhejiang and head of the Political and Legal Affairs Commission of Zhejiang. In April 2017, Yuan was appointed as acting governor of Zhejiang; he was confirmed on July 7. In 2018, he headed an inquiry committee over public protests due to the results of English language test in Gaokao; the committee concluded in December that the Zhejiang Education Department made a "wrong policy decision", distorting many students' scores.

On 31 August 2020, Yuan was appointed as the CCP Secretary of Zhejiang. In December 2020, Yuan chaired a meeting of the Zhejiang Provincial CCP Standing Committee which discussed directives by the central CCP leadership to break up monopolies and control expansion of capital while "promoting healthy and regulated development of the platform economy". In April 2021, Yuan chaired another meeting of the Standing Committee, which pledged to "supervise and guide" the platform economy, including Alibaba Group. It also pledged to "promote the health and regulated development" of the platform economy.

=== Chongqing ===
After the 20th Party Congress in October 2022, Yuan became a member of the CCP Politburo. On 8 December 2022, Yuan was appointed as the CCP Secretary of Chongqing, succeeding Chen Min'er. Weeks later, he resigned as chairman of the Zhejiang People's Congress.

He met with Hong Kong Chief Executive John Lee Ka-chiu in May 2023, where both cities pledged to increase cooperation in several areas. In August 2023, Yuan met with members of US General Joseph Stilwell's family for the 140th anniversary of his birth, saying he hoped to take the visit as an opportunity to "better promote people-to-people exchanges between China and the United States and contribute to the development of China-US relations".

Party political offices
Preceded by Chen Min'er	Party Secretary of Chongqing; 2022–present	Incumbent
Preceded by Che Jun	Party Secretary of Zhejiang; 2020–2022	Succeeded by Yi Lianhong
Preceded by Wang Huizhong	Secretary of the Political and Legal Affairs Committee of the CCP Zhejiang Provincial Committee; 2016–2017	Succeeded by Xu Jia'ai
Preceded by Wang Huizhong	Deputy Party Secretary of Zhejiang; 2016–2017	Succeeded by Tang Yijun
Preceded by Zhao Xiaoping	Secretary of the Party Working Committee of Ningdong Energy and Chemical Industry Base; 2012–2014	Succeeded by Zhang Chaochao
Government offices
Preceded by Che Jun	Governor of Zhejiang; 2017–2020	Succeeded by Zheng Shanjie
Preceded by Cai Qi	Executive Vice Governor of Zhejiang; 2014–2016	Succeeded by Feng Fei
Preceded by Zhang Chaochao	Executive Vice Chairman of Ningxia Hui Autonomous Region; 2013–2014	Succeeded by Liu Hui
Assembly seats
Preceded by Che Jun	Chairman of Zhejiang People's Congress; 2020–2022	Succeeded by Yi Lianhong
Order of precedence
Preceded by Liu Guozhong as Member of the Politburo of the Chinese Communist Party	Order of precedence of China as Member of the Politburo of the Chinese Communist Party	Succeeded by Zhang Shengmin as Member of the Politburo of the Chinese Communist Party
