= Li Zemin =

Chinese politician (born 1934)

Li Zemin (Chinese: 李泽民; born November 17, 1934) is a Chinese politician who previously served as the Chinese Communist Party (CCP) Committee Secretary for Zhejiang Province from December 1988 to September 1998 and chairman of the Standing Committee of the Zhejiang People's Congress from January 1998 to January 2003.

Li was born in Cangxi County, Sichuan Province in 1934. In 1952, he joined the People's Liberation Army and fought in the Korean War. In 1954, he joined the CCP. Li graduated from Renmin University of China in 1960 with an undergraduate degree in CCP history and later taught at the university. Prior to taking his political positions in Zhejiang, he served as the CCP Committee Secretary for Shenyang and deputy CCP committee secretary for Liaoning Province from July 1986 to December 1988.

Political offices
Preceded by Chen Anyu	Chairman of the Zhejiang People's Congress; 1998–2003	Succeeded by Xi Jinping
Preceded by Xue Ju	Communist Party Secretary of Zhejiang; 1988–1998	Succeeded by Zhang Dejiang
