= Li Fengping =

Chinese politician

Li Fengping (1912–2008) was a politician of the People's Republic of China. He was born in Tongliang District, Chongqing, which was then part of Sichuan Province. He attended the Central Party School of the Chinese Communist Party in Yan'an, Shaanxi Province. During the Second Sino-Japanese War, he served in the New Fourth Army. He was governor of Zhejiang from 1979 to 1983 and later Chairman of the Zhejiang People's Congress. He was a delegate to the 5th National People's Congress.

Preceded by Tie Ying	Governor of Zhejiang; 1979–1983	Succeeded by Xue Ju
Preceded by	Chairmen of Zhejiang People's Congress; 1983–1988	Succeeded by Chen Anyu
