= Qiao Chuanxiu =

Chinese politician (born 1954)

Chairman of the CPPCC Zhejiang Committee
- Incumbent
- Assumed office 2011
- Preceded by: Zhou Guofu

Deputy Secretary of All-China Federation of Trade Unions
- In office 2006–2011

Personal details
- Born: 1954 Shou County, Anhui, China
- Party: Chinese Communist Party

Qiao Chuanxi (born 1954 in Shou County, Anhui Province) is the current Chairwoman of Chinese People's Political Consultative Conference (CPPCC) Zhejiang Provincial Committee. Qiao joined the Chinese Communist Party in 1973.
