= Zhao Hongzhu =

Former Communist Party Chief of Zhejiang province

- 赵洪祝
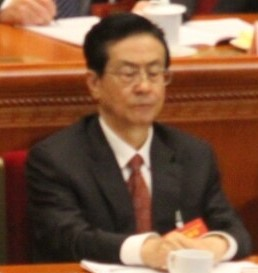
- Zhao in 2017

Deputy Secretary of the Central Commission for Discipline Inspection
- In office 15 November 2012 – October 2017
- Secretary: Wang Qishan
- Rank: 1st
- Portfolios: Internal Supervision; Leading Group on Discipline Reform Initiatives

Deputy Leader of the Central Leading Group for Inspection Work
- In office 15 November 2012 – October 2017 Serving with Zhao Leji
- Leader: Wang Qishan

Party Secretary of Zhejiang
- In office 25 March 2007 – 21 November 2012
- Preceded by: Xi Jinping
- Succeeded by: Xia Baolong

Personal details
- Born: July 1947 (age 78) Ningcheng County, Inner Mongolia
- Party: Chinese Communist Party

Zhao Hongzhu
- Traditional Chinese: 趙洪祝
- Simplified Chinese: 赵洪祝
Transcriptions
Standard Mandarin
- Hanyu Pinyin: Zhào Hóngzhù

Zhao Hongzhu (Chinese: 赵洪祝; born July 1947) is a retired Chinese politician and a previous member of the Chinese Communist Party's national leadership. Zhao served as the Deputy Secretary of the Central Commission for Discipline Inspection (CCDI), the Communist Party's anti-corruption agency, as well as a Secretary of the Central Secretariat.

Zhao spent his early career in Inner Mongolia before being transferred to work for the Ministry of Supervision and the CCDI in Beijing. He was the Communist Party Secretary of Zhejiang province from 2007 to 2012.

== Biography ==
Zhao was born in July 1947 in Ningcheng County in north China's Inner Mongolia Autonomous Region. He is a member of the Han ethnic group and his father was a farmer. He graduated from the Central Party School and began work in Inner Mongolia as a logistics officer. He then entered the Hulunbuir League Nomadic Administration Bureau. Thereafter, he was named to the leadership council of a local ranch, serving as its Disciplinary Secretary.

In 1980, Zhao entered the party's Organization Department in Hinggan League. He became the head of the department in 1985 and in 1988, he became the deputy party chief of Hinggan League. He left Inner Mongolia in 1992 to take on a job in the research office of the Central Commission for Discipline Inspection (CCDI). In 1994, he became the head of the General Office serving the CCDI.

In April 1998, Zhao became the Deputy Minister of Supervision of the People's Republic of China. His tenure lasted until July 2002. In November 2002, he became a standing committee member of the CCDI and, in November 2003, became also the Executive Deputy Head of the Organization Department of the Chinese Communist Party.

Zhao was appointed Party Secretary of Zhejiang in March 2007, taking the office vacated by Xi Jinping, who went on to become party chief of Shanghai. He stepped down as party chief of Zhejiang in November 2012 to take up the number two role in the Communist Party's top anti-corruption body in the Central Commission for Discipline Inspection, under Secretary Wang Qishan. As was customary for the top-ranked CCDI Deputy Secretary, Zhao also became a Secretary of the Central Secretariat at the 18th Party Congress. Since joining the CCDI, Zhao has taken on the role of the leader of a coordination group in charge of implementing specific aspects of the reforms of the discipline and supervision system. Zhao was also put in charge of the Office for the Supervision of Discipline Personnel, an internal audit and control organ of the CCDI. In 2013, Zhao was also named deputy leader of the Central Leading Group for Advancing Mass Line Education.

According to Hong Kong–based news magazine Chengming, Zhao was the top official present when former official Ling Jihua was taken in for investigation.

Zhao is a member of the 17th and 18th Central Committees of the Chinese Communist Party. He is also a member of the 18th Standing Committee of the Central Commission for Discipline Inspection.

Party political offices
Preceded by Li Tielin	Executive Deputy Head of the Organization Department of the Chinese Communist Party; 2003–2007	Succeeded by Shen Yueyue
Preceded by Xi Jinping	Party Secretary of Zhejiang; 2007–2012	Succeeded by Xia Baolong
