= Yi Lianhong =

Chinese politician (born 1959)

- 易炼红
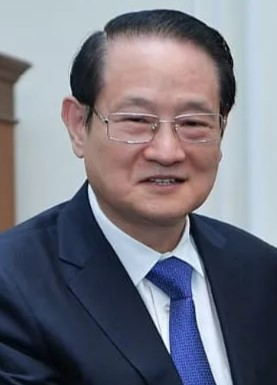
- Yi in 2023

Party Secretary of Zhejiang
- In office 7 December 2022 – 28 October 2024
- Deputy: Wang Hao (Governor)
- Preceded by: Yuan Jiajun
- Succeeded by: Wang Hao

Chairman of the Zhejiang Provincial People's Congress
- In office 15 January 2023 – 27 November 2024
- Preceded by: Yuan Jiajun

Party Secretary of Jiangxi
- In office 18 October 2021 – 6 December 2022
- Deputy: Ye Jianchun (Governor)
- Preceded by: Liu Qi
- Succeeded by: Yin Hong

Chairman of the Jiangxi Provincial People's Congress
- In office 20 January 2022 – 15 January 2023
- Preceded by: Liu Qi
- Succeeded by: Yin Hong

Governor of Jiangxi
- In office 6 August 2018 – 21 October 2021
- Party Secretary: Liu Qi
- Preceded by: Liu Qi
- Succeeded by: Ye Jianchun

Deputy Party Secretary of Liaoning
- In office May 2018 – July 2018
- Party Secretary: Chen Qiufa
- Preceded by: Wang Menghui
- Succeeded by: Zhou Bo

Personal details
- Born: September 1959 (age 67) Lianyuan, Hunan, China
- Party: Chinese Communist Party
- Education: Hunan Normal University; Shaanxi Normal University

Chinese name
- Simplified Chinese: 易炼红
- Traditional Chinese: 易煉紅
Transcriptions
Standard Mandarin
- Hanyu Pinyin: Yì Liànhóng

Yi Lianhong (Chinese: 易炼红; born September 1959) is a Chinese politician. Originally from Hunan province, Yi rose through the ranks as an academic at the provincial party school; he later served as party secretary of Yueyang and party secretary of Changsha, before being transferred to Shenyang.

== Biography ==
Yi Lianhong was born in Lianyuan County, Hunan province. He began to work in August 1976 as a rusticated youth performing manual labor in Guihua township. Following the Cultural Revolution, Yi attended Hunan Normal University and graduated in 1982 with a degree in political economics. In July 1982, he became an instructor at the Zhaoyang Basic College (邵阳基础大学). After a few years of teaching, he went on to graduate school at the Shaanxi Normal University to continue studying political economics. He joined the Chinese Communist Party in June 1985.

After receiving his master's degree in 1987, Yi was assigned to work at the Hunan Party School, where he taught economics. In 1990, he worked for a chemical factory in Zhuzhou as an administrator. In January 1992, he joined the science and technology research office at the Hunan Party School. In September 1994, he became assistant to the president of the party school. In September 1995 he was promoted to vice president of the party school. In July 2000, he was promoted again to executive vice president (prefecture-level, zhengtingji, 正厅级).

In May 2004, Yi was named party chief of Yueyang, his first foray into a regional leadership role. In November 2011, he was admitted to the Hunan provincial party standing committee, and a month later took on the office of the secretary-general.

In May 2013, Yi was named party chief of Changsha. In July 2017, he was transferred to Shenyang to become party chief there; it was the first cross-provincial transfer of Yi's career. In May 2018 he was named deputy party chief of Liaoning.

After only serving two months as deputy party chief of Liaoning, Yi was named deputy party chief of Jiangxi in August 2018, and he was appointed the acting Governor in August 2018. On 18 October 2021, he was promoted to Party Secretary of Jiangxi, the top political position in the province. On 20 January 2022, he took office as chairman of Jiangxi People's Congress.

In December 2022, he was appointed Party Secretary of Zhejiang, replacing Yuan Jiajun.

Yi has authored a number of works on economics, agriculture, and his tenure in Yueyang.

== Investigation ==
On 10 February 2026, Yi was suspected of "serious violations of laws and regulations" by the Central Commission for Discipline Inspection (CCDI), the party's internal disciplinary body, and the National Supervisory Commission, the highest anti-corruption agency of China.

Party political offices
Previous: Yu Laishan	Party Secretary of Yueyang; 2004-2011	Next: Huang Lanxiang
Preceded by Yang Taibo	Secretary–General of Hunan Provincial Committee of the Chinese Communist Party; 2011–2013	Succeeded by Han Yongwen
Preceded by Chen Run'er	Party Secretary of Changsha; 2013–2017	Succeeded by Hu Henghua
Preceded by Wang Menghui	Party Secretary of Shenyang; 2017–2018	Succeeded by Zhang Lei
Preceded by Wang Menghui	Deputy Party Secretary of Liaoning; 2018–2021	Succeeded by Zhou Bo
Preceded by Liu Qi	Party Secretary of Jiangxi; 2021–2022	Succeeded by Yin Hong
Preceded by Yuan Jiajun	Party Secretary of Zhejiang; 2022–present	Succeeded by Wang Hao
Government offices
Preceded by Liu Qi	Governor of Jiangxi; 2018–2021	Succeeded by Ye Jianchun
Assembly seats
Preceded by Liu Qi	Chairman of Jiangxi People's Congress; 2022–2023	Succeeded by Yin Hong
Preceded by Yuan Jiajun	Chairman of Zhejiang People's Congress; 2023–2024	Succeeded by Wang Hao
