= Tie Ying =

Chinese politician

Tie Ying (Chinese: 铁瑛; pinyin: tiě yīng; 1916 – February 6, 2009) was a Chinese politician and People's Liberation Army major general. He was born in Nanle County, Henan Province. He was Secretary of the Chinese Communist Party's Zhejiang Province Committee (1977) as well as Governor of Zhejiang (February 1977 – December 1979).

Government offices
Preceded by Tan Qilong	Governor of Zhejiang; 1977–1979	Succeeded by Li Fengping
Party political offices
Preceded by Tan Qilong	Communist Party Chief of Zhejiang; 1977–1983	Succeeded by Wang Fang
Military offices
Preceded by Wu Shihong	Political Commissar of the Zhejiang Military District; 1977–1983	Succeeded by Mou Hanqing
