= Politics of Shaanxi =

Politics of a province of China

The politics of Shaanxi Province in the People's Republic of China is structured in a dual party-government system like all other governing institutions in mainland China.

The Governor of Shaanxi (陕西省省长) is the highest-ranking official in the People's Government of Shaanxi. However, in the province's dual party-government governing system, the Governor is considered to have less power than the Shaanxi Chinese Communist Party (CCP) Provincial Committee Secretary (中共陕西省委书记), colloquially termed the "Shaanxi CCP Party Chief"; since the Governor is always ranked as the First-Deputy Secretary in the Shaanxi Chinese Communist Party Provincial Committee.

Shaanxi was established as a provincial government since the Yuan Dynasty. On 10 January 1950, the People's Government of Shaanxi was established in Xi'an. Ma Minfang was then appointed as both the first Governor and CCP chief of Shaanxi.

== List of CCP secretaries ==
Image	Name (English)	Name (Chinese)	Term start	Term end	Ref.
	Ma Mingfang	马明方	January 1950	October 1952	
	Pan Zili	潘自力	October 1952	1956	
	Zhang Desheng	张德生	July 1956	November 1964	
	Hu Yaobang	胡耀邦	November 1964	May 1965	
	Huo Shilian	霍士廉	October 1965	March 1971	
	Li Ruishan	李瑞山	March 1971	December 1978	
	Wang Renzhong	王任重	10 December 1978	25 December 1978	
	Ma Wenrui	马文瑞	26 December 1978	August 1984	
	Bai Jinian	白纪年	August 1984	August 1987	
	Zhang Boxing	张勃兴	August 1987	November 1994	
	An Qiyuan	安启元	November 1994	August 1997	
	Li Jianguo	李建国	August 1997	25 March 2007	
	Zhao Leji	赵乐际	25 March 2007	19 November 2012	
	Zhao Zhengyong	赵正永	19 November 2012	27 March 2016	
	Lou Qinjian	娄勤俭	27 March 2016	29 October 2017	
	Hu Heping	胡和平	29 October 2017	31 July 2020	
	Liu Guozhong	刘国中	31 July 2020	27 November 2022	
	Zhao Yide	赵一徳	27 November 2022	Incumbent	

== List of governors ==
No.	Officeholder	Term of office		Party	Ref.
No.	Officeholder	Took office	Left office	Party	Ref.
Governor of the Shaanxi Provincial People's Government
1	Ma Mingfang (1905–1974)	May 1949	November 1952	Chinese Communist Party	
2	Zhao Shoushan (1894–1965)	November 1952	December 1954	Chinese Communist Party	
Governor of the Shaanxi Provincial People's Committee
(2)	Zhao Shoushan (1894–1965)	December 1954	July 1959	Chinese Communist Party	
3	Zhao Boping (1902–1993)	July 1959	March 1963	Chinese Communist Party	
4	Li Qiming (1915–2007)	March 1963	April 1968	Chinese Communist Party	
Director of the Shaanxi Revolutionary Committee
5	Li Ruishan (1920–1997)	April 1968	December 1978	Chinese Communist Party	
6	Wang Renzhong (1917–1992)	December 1978	February 1979	Chinese Communist Party	
Governor of the Shaanxi Provincial People's Government
7	Yu Mingtao (1917–2017)	December 1979	April 1983	Chinese Communist Party	
8	Li Qingwei (1920–1994)	April 1983	December 1986	Chinese Communist Party	
9	Zhang Boxing (1930–2025)	December 1986	September 1987	Chinese Communist Party	
10	Hou Zongbin (1929–2017)	September 1987	March 1990	Chinese Communist Party	
11	Bai Qingcai (1932–2016)	March 1990	December 1994	Chinese Communist Party	
12	Cheng Andong (born 1936)	December 1994	May 2002	Chinese Communist Party	
13	Jia Zhibang (born 1946)	May 2002	October 2004	Chinese Communist Party	
14	Chen Deming (born 1953)	October 2004	June 2006	Chinese Communist Party	
15	Yuan Chunqing (born 1952)	1 June 2006	2 June 2010	Chinese Communist Party	
16	Zhao Zhengyong (born 1951)	2 June 2010	21 December 2012	Chinese Communist Party	
17	Lou Qinjian (born 1956)	21 December 2012	1 April 2016	Chinese Communist Party	
18	Hu Heping (born 1962)	1 April 2016	4 January 2018	Chinese Communist Party	
19	Liu Guozhong (born 1962)	4 January 2018	2 August 2020	Chinese Communist Party	
20	Zhao Yide (born 1965)	2 August 2020	1 December 2022	Chinese Communist Party	
21	Zhao Gang (born 1968)	1 December 2022	Incumbent	Chinese Communist Party	

== List of chairmen of Shaanxi People's Congress ==
Chairmen	Chinese name	Term	Notes
Ma Wenrui	马文瑞	1979–1983	Elected by the 5th Shaanxi People's Congress
Yan Kelun	严克伦	1983–1988	Elected by the 6th Shaanxi People's Congress
Li Xipu	李溪溥	1988–1993	Elected by the 7th Shaanxi People's Congress
Zhang Boxing	张勃兴	1993–1998	Elected by the 8th Shaanxi People's Congress
Li Jianguo	李建国	1998–2007	Elected by the 9th Shaanxi People's Congress and then was re-elected by the 10th
Cui Lintao	崔林涛	2007–2008	Appointed as Acting Chairman by the 10th Shaanxi People's Congress
Zhao Leji	赵乐际	2008–2012	Elected by the 11th Shaanxi People's Congress
Zhao Zhengyong	赵正永	2012–2016	Elected by the 12th Shaanxi People's Congress
Lou Qinjian	娄勤俭	2016–2018	Elected by the 12th Shaanxi People's Congress
Hu Hepin	胡和平	2018–2020	Elected by the 13th Shaanxi People's Congress
Liu Guozhong	刘国中	2020–	Elected by the 13th Shaanxi People's Congress

== List of chairmen of Shaanxi CPPCC ==
1. Ma Mingfang (马明方): 1949–1952
2. Pan Zili (潘自力): 1952–1955
3. zhang Desheng (张德生): 1955–1960
4. Fang Zhongru (方仲如): 1960–1963
5. Zhao Shouyi (赵守一): 1963–1967
6. Li Ruishan (李瑞山): 1977–1979
7. Lv Jianren (吕剑人): 1979–1985
8. Tan Weixu (谈维煦): 1985–1988
9. Zhou Yaguang (周雅光): 1988–1998
10. An Qiyuan (安启元): 1998–2003
11. Ai Peishan (艾丕善): 2003–2006
12. Ma Zhongping (马中平): 2008–2016
13. Han Yong (韩勇): 2016–2022
14. Xu Xinrong(徐新荣): 2022–present

== See also ==
- Politics of the People's Republic of China
