= Shaanxi Provincial People's Government =

Government organization in Xi'an, China

Shaanxi Provincial People's Government 陕西省人民政府
- Established: January 10, 1950; 76 years ago

Leadership
- Governor: Zhao Gang; 2 December 2022
- Parent body: Central People's Government; Shaanxi Provincial People's Congress
- Elected by: Shaanxi Provincial People's Congress

Meeting place
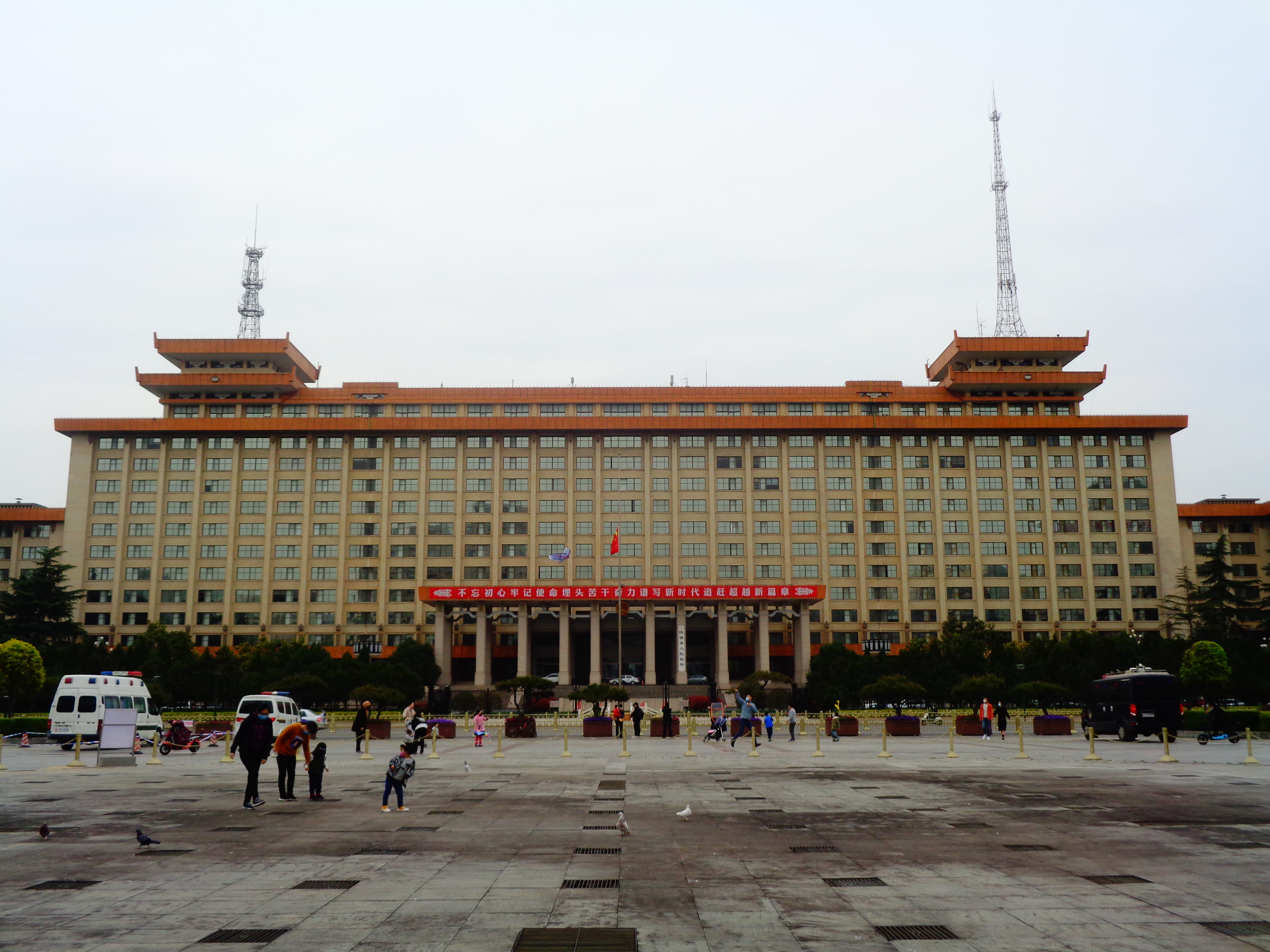
- Headquarters

Website
- www.shaanxi.gov.cn

The Shaanxi Provincial People's Government is the local administrative agency of Shaanxi. It is officially elected by the Shaanxi Provincial People's Congress and is formally responsible to the Shaanxi Provincial People's Congress and its Standing Committee. Under the country's one-party system, the governor is subordinate to the secretary of the Shaanxi Provincial Committee of the Chinese Communist Party. The Provincial government is headed by a governor, currently Zhao Gang.

== History ==
The Shaanxi Province was first established in the Qing Dynasty; before the founding of the People's Republic of China, the province consisted of Xi'an City, 92 counties and 1 administrative bureau.

During the Second Civil War, two Soviet governments, the Shaanxi -Gansu Border and Shaanxi-Northern Soviet Governments, and 11 county-level Soviet governments were established in northern Shaanxi and Yan'an. After the Central Red Army and the CPC Central Committee arrived in northern Shaanxi after the Long March, they merged the existing and newly developed government institutions into two provinces, Shaanxi -Gansu Province and three special districts, namely Sanbian, Guanzhong and Shenfu. On September 6, 1937, the Shaanxi-Gansu-Ningxia Border Region Government was established. As of 1943, the Shaanxi-Gansu-Ningxia Border Region Government governed Yan'an City and more than 20 counties including Shenfu and Yan'an in Shaanxi Province.

In May 1949, the Shaanxi-Gansu-Ningxia Border Region Government moved to Xi'an. After the People's Liberation Army entered the entire province of Shaanxi, the administrative divisions were adjusted to 102 counties (cities, bureaus), which were managed by the sub-districts, the Northern Shaanxi Administrative Office, the Southern Shaanxi Administrative Office and Xi'an City. On January 10, 1950, the Shaanxi Provincial People's Government was established, with its capital in Xi'an. On the same day, the "Shaanxi Provincial People's Government Announcement" (Secret No. 1) was issued. The content is as follows:

"In compliance with the order of the Central People's Government, Ma Mingfang is appointed as Chairman of the Shaanxi Provincial People's Government, Zhang Bangying, Zhang Fenghui, and Han Zhao'e are appointed as Vice Chairmen, Fang Zhongru, Wang Fuchu, Mao Fengxiang, Zuo Xiezhong, An Wenqin... Han Wangchen and Su Zichen are appointed as Committee Members. Mingfang and others took office in Xi'an on January 10, 1950, and are determined to wholeheartedly implement the Common Program of the Chinese People's Political Consultative Conference, uphold the will of the Central People's Government and the Northwest Military and Political Committee, unite the people of Shaanxi, be of one mind and one virtue, and be diligent and loyal..."

After the establishment of the people's congress system, in accordance with the Constitution of the People's Republic of China adopted in 1954, the second session of the first Shaanxi Provincial People's Congress was held in Xi'an Mass Hall from December 26 to December 31 of that year; the meeting elected members of the Shaanxi Provincial People's Committee. As a result, the highest official of the people's government was no longer called the chairman, but the governor.

After the Cultural Revolution began, political organizations at all levels emerged in the form of revolutionary committees. So on May 1, 1968, the Shaanxi Provincial Revolutionary Committee was established in Xi'an. In December 1979, the Second Session of the Fifth Shaanxi Provincial People's Congress decided to restore the Shaanxi Provincial People's Government. This meeting also re-elected the governor, vice governor, president of the Provincial High People's Court, and procurator-general of the Provincial People's Procuratorate. The Shaanxi Provincial People's Government is located at No. 280 Jiefang Road, Xincheng District, Xi'an.

== Organization ==
The organization of the Shaanxi Provincial People's Government includes:

- General Office of the Shaanxi Provincial People's Government

=== Component Departments ===
- Shaanxi Provincial Development and Reform Commission
- Shaanxi Provincial Department of Education
- Shaanxi Provincial Department of Science and Technology
- Shaanxi Provincial Department of Industry and Information Technology
- Shaanxi Provincial Ethnic and Religious Affairs Committee
- Shaanxi Provincial Public Security Department
- Shaanxi Provincial Department of Civil Affairs
- Shaanxi Provincial Department of Justice
- Shaanxi Provincial Department of Finance
- Shaanxi Provincial Department of Human Resources and Social Security
- Shaanxi Provincial Department of Natural Resources
- Shaanxi Provincial Department of Ecology and Environment
- Shaanxi Provincial Department of Housing and Urban-Rural Development
- Shaanxi Provincial Department of Transportation
- Shaanxi Provincial Water Resources Department
- Shaanxi Provincial Department of Agriculture and Rural Affairs
- Shaanxi Provincial Department of Commerce
- Shaanxi Provincial Department of Culture and Tourism
- Shaanxi Provincial Health Commission (formerly the Shaanxi-Gansu-Ningxia Border Region Health Bureau, renamed the Shaanxi Provincial People's Government Health Department in February 1950, the Shaanxi Provincial Health Department in June 1955, the Shaanxi Provincial Revolutionary Committee Health Bureau in May 1970, and later successively renamed the Shaanxi Provincial Health Department and Shaanxi Provincial Health Commission)
- Shaanxi Provincial Department of Veterans Affairs
- Shaanxi Provincial Emergency Management Department
- Shaanxi Provincial Audit Office

=== Directly affiliated special institution ===
- State-owned Assets Supervision and Administration Commission of Shaanxi Provincial People's Government

=== Organizations under the government ===
- Shaanxi Provincial Administration for Market Regulation
- Shaanxi Provincial Forestry Bureau
- Shaanxi Provincial Radio and Television Bureau
- Shaanxi Provincial Sports Bureau
- Shaanxi Provincial Bureau of Statistics
- Shaanxi Provincial Cultural Relics Bureau
- Shaanxi Provincial People's Government Research Office
- Shaanxi Provincial Civil Air Defense Office
- Shaanxi Provincial Bureau of Letters and Calls
- Shaanxi Provincial Medical Insurance Bureau
- Shaanxi Provincial Rural Revitalization Bureau
- Shaanxi Provincial Local Financial Administration Bureau

=== Departmental management organization ===
- The Shaanxi Provincial Bureau of Grain and Material Reserves is managed by the Provincial Development and Reform Commission.
- Shaanxi Provincial Energy Bureau is managed by the Provincial Development and Reform Commission.
- The Shaanxi Provincial Prison Administration Bureau is managed by the Provincial Department of Justice.
- The Shaanxi Provincial Administration of Traditional Chinese Medicine is managed by the Provincial Health Commission.
- The Shaanxi Provincial Drug Administration is managed by the Provincial Market Supervision Administration.
- The Shaanxi Provincial Intellectual Property Office is managed by the Provincial Market Supervision Administration.

=== Directly affiliated institutions ===
- Shaanxi Provincial Local Chronicles Office
- Shaanxi Academy of Sciences
- Shaanxi Academy of Social Sciences
- Shaanxi Provincial Government Affairs Service Center
- Shaanxi Geological Survey Institute
- Shaanxi Radio and Television
- Shaanxi Provincial Public Resources Trading Center
- Shaanxi Provincial Information Center
- Shaanxi Provincial Government Big Data Service Center
- Qinling National Botanical Garden

=== Dispatched agencies ===
- Shaanxi Province Xixian New Area Development and Construction Management Committee
- Yangling Agricultural High-tech Industry Demonstration Zone Management Committee
- Shaanxi Provincial People's Government Office in Beijing
- Shaanxi Provincial People's Government Office in Shanghai
- Shaanxi Provincial People's Government Office in Guangzhou
- Shaanxi Provincial People's Government Office in Xinjiang

=== Subordinate local governments ===
- Xi'an Municipal People's Government
- Yulin Municipal People's Government
- Yan'an Municipal People's Government
- Tongchuan Municipal People's Government
- Baoji Municipal People's Government
- Xianyang Municipal People's Government
- Weinan Municipal People's Government
- Hanzhong Municipal People's Government
- Ankang Municipal People's Government
- Shangluo Municipal People's Government

== See also ==
- Politics of Shaanxi
  - Shaanxi Provincial People's Congress
  - Shaanxi Provincial People's Government
    - Governor of Shaanxi
  - Shaanxi Provincial Committee of the Chinese Communist Party
    - Party Secretary of Shaanxi
  - Shaanxi Provincial Committee of the Chinese People's Political Consultative Conference
