= Chen Guoqiang =

Chinese politician (born 1962)

- 陈国强

Vice-Governor of Shaanxi
- In office January 2018 – March 2019
- Governor: Liu Guozhong

Secretary-General of Shaanxi
- In office February 2013 – March 2018
- Preceded by: Qin Zheng
- Succeeded by: Fang Weifeng

Personal details
- Born: May 1962 (age 64) Suzhou, Anhui, China
- Party: Chinese Communist Party (expelled; 1986-2020)
- Education: Xi'an University of Finance and Economics; Central Party School of the Chinese Communist Party; West Virginia University; Cheung Kong Graduate School of Business

Chinese name
- Traditional Chinese: 陳國強
- Simplified Chinese: 陈国强
Transcriptions
Standard Mandarin
- Hanyu Pinyin: Chén Guóqiáng

Chen Guoqiang (Chinese: 陈国强; born May 1962) is a former Chinese politician who spent his entire career in northwest China's Shaanxi province. He was removed from office on 29 March 2019. Previously he served as the vice-governor of Shaanxi, where he headed the province's land and resources, environmental protection, housing, urban and rural construction, and transportation.

== Biography ==
Chen was born in Suzhou, Anhui in May 1962. After the Resumption of College Entrance Examination, he entered Xi'an Basic University in September 1981, majoring in machine building at the Mechanical Department, where he graduated in July 1984. He entered politics in July 1984, and joined the Chinese Communist Party (CCP) in June 1986. He also studied at the CCP Central Party School, West Virginia University and Cheung Kong Graduate School of Business as a part-time student. After university, he was assigned to the Shaanxi Provincial Government, where he assumed various posts there. In November 2010 he became the deputy secretary-general, rising to secretary-general in February 2013. He concurrently served as president of Shanxi Vocational Technology College of Economic Management.

== Investigation ==
In January 2018 he was elevated to vice-governor of Shaanxi, a position he held until March 2019, when he was removed from office. As vice-governor, he focused on land and resources, environmental protection, housing, urban and rural construction, and transportation. During his short term, he was involved in the "billions of mineral rights case" (Chinese: 千亿矿权案件). Two months ago, his fellow townsman and superior Zhao Zhengyong has been placed under investigation as CCP general secretary Xi Jinping's continues a campaign against corruption at all levels of government. He is called Zhao Yongzheng's steward by the Chinese media.

On January 4, 2020, he has been expelled from the Chinese Communist Party (CCP) and dismissed from public office. His qualification for delegate to the 13th CPC Shaanxi Provincial Congress was terminated. And his case will be transferred to the procuratorate for further investigation and prosecution. He was detained on January 8. On June 10, 2020, he stood trial for graft at the First Intermediate People's Court of Tianjin. He was charged of taking advantage of his various positions in Shaanxi between 2006 and 2018 to seek profits for various companies and individuals in project contracting, obtaining loans and personnel promotion and recruitment and then accepted bribes of more than 35.66 million yuan (about 5 million U.S. dollars) in return personally or through his family members. On September 15, he was sentenced to 13 years in prison for accepting bribes by the First Intermediate People's Court of Tianjin. He was fined 3 million yuan (over $439,000). He said he accepted the sentence and would not appeal.

Government offices
Preceded by Qin Zheng	Secretary-General of Shaanxi; 2013–2018	Succeeded by Fang Weifeng
