= Governor of Shaanxi =

Chinese regional executive

Governor of the Shaanxi Provincial People's Government
- 陕西省人民政府省长
- National Emblem of China

- Flag of China
- Incumbent; Zhao Gang since 1 December 2022
- Shaanxi Provincial People's Government
- Type: Governor
- Status: Provincial and ministerial-level official
- Reports to: Shaanxi Provincial People's Congress and its Standing Committee
- Nominator: Presidium of the Shaanxi Provincial People's Congress
- Appointer: Shaanxi Provincial People's Congress
- Term length: Five years, renewable
- Inaugural holder: Ma Mingfang
- Formation: May 1949
- Deputy: Deputy Governors; Secretary-General

The governor of Shaanxi, officially the Governor of the Shaanxi Provincial People's Government, is the head of Shaanxi Province and leader of the Shaanxi Provincial People's Government.

The governor is elected by the Shaanxi Provincial People's Congress, and responsible to it and its Standing Committee. The governor is a provincial level official and is responsible for the overall decision-making of the provincial government. The governor is assisted by an executive vice governor as well as several vice governors. The governor generally serves as the deputy secretary of the Shaanxi Provincial Committee of the Chinese Communist Party and as a member of the CCP Central Committee. The governor is the second highest-ranking official in the province after the secretary of the CCP Shaanxi Committee. The current governor is Zhao Gang, who took office on 1 December 2022.

== List of governors ==
=== People's Republic of China ===
No.	Officeholder	Term of office		Party	Ref.
No.	Officeholder	Took office	Left office	Party	Ref.
Governor of the Shaanxi Provincial People's Government
1	Ma Mingfang (1905–1974)	May 1949	November 1952	Chinese Communist Party	
2	Zhao Shoushan (1894–1965)	November 1952	December 1954	Chinese Communist Party	
Governor of the Shaanxi Provincial People's Committee
(2)	Zhao Shoushan (1894–1965)	December 1954	July 1959	Chinese Communist Party	
3	Zhao Boping (1902–1993)	July 1959	March 1963	Chinese Communist Party	
4	Li Qiming (1915–2007)	March 1963	April 1968	Chinese Communist Party	
Director of the Shaanxi Revolutionary Committee
5	Li Ruishan (1920–1997)	April 1968	December 1978	Chinese Communist Party	
6	Wang Renzhong (1917–1992)	December 1978	February 1979	Chinese Communist Party	
Governor of the Shaanxi Provincial People's Government
7	Yu Mingtao (1917–2017)	December 1979	April 1983	Chinese Communist Party	
8	Li Qingwei (1920–1994)	April 1983	December 1986	Chinese Communist Party	
9	Zhang Boxing (1930–2025)	December 1986	September 1987	Chinese Communist Party	
10	Hou Zongbin (1929–2017)	September 1987	March 1990	Chinese Communist Party	
11	Bai Qingcai (1932–2016)	March 1990	December 1994	Chinese Communist Party	
12	Cheng Andong (born 1936)	December 1994	May 2002	Chinese Communist Party	
13	Jia Zhibang (born 1946)	May 2002	October 2004	Chinese Communist Party	
14	Chen Deming (born 1953)	October 2004	June 2006	Chinese Communist Party	
15	Yuan Chunqing (born 1952)	1 June 2006	2 June 2010	Chinese Communist Party	
16	Zhao Zhengyong (born 1951)	2 June 2010	21 December 2012	Chinese Communist Party	
17	Lou Qinjian (born 1956)	21 December 2012	1 April 2016	Chinese Communist Party	
18	Hu Heping (born 1962)	1 April 2016	4 January 2018	Chinese Communist Party	
19	Liu Guozhong (born 1962)	4 January 2018	2 August 2020	Chinese Communist Party	
20	Zhao Yide (born 1965)	2 August 2020	1 December 2022	Chinese Communist Party	
21	Zhao Gang (born 1968)	1 December 2022	Incumbent	Chinese Communist Party	
