= NUBS =

Nubs or NUBS may refer to:

- Nubs, a character in Star Wars: Young Jedi Adventures
- Nubs Kleinke (1911–1950), Major League Baseball player
- Nanjing University Business School
- Nottingham University Business School

== See also ==
- Nub (disambiguation)
