= Party Secretary of Shaanxi =

Provincial government position in China

Secretary of the Shaanxi Provincial Committee of the Chinese Communist Party
- 中国共产党陕西省委员会书记
- Emblem of the Chinese Communist Party

- Flag of the Chinese Communist Party
- Incumbent; Zhao Yide since 27 November 2022
- Shaanxi Provincial Committee of the Chinese Communist Party
- Type: Party Committee Secretary
- Status: Provincial and ministerial-level official
- Member of: Shaanxi Provincial Standing Committee
- Nominator: Central Committee
- Appointer: Shaanxi Provincial Committee; Central Committee
- Inaugural holder: Geng Bingguang
- Formation: July 1927
- Deputy: Deputy Secretary; Secretary-General

The secretary of the Shaanxi Provincial Committee of the Chinese Communist Party is the leader of the Shaanxi Provincial Committee of the Chinese Communist Party (CCP). As the CCP is the sole ruling party of the People's Republic of China (PRC), the secretary is the highest ranking post in Shaanxi.

The secretary is officially appointed by the CCP Central Committee based on the recommendation of the CCP Organization Department, which is then approved by the Politburo and its Standing Committee. The secretary can be also appointed by a plenary meeting of the Shaanxi Provincial Committee, but the candidate must be the same as the one approved by the central government. The secretary leads the Standing Committee of the Shaanxi Provincial Committee, and is usually a member of the CCP Central Committee. The secretary leads the work of the Provincial Committee and its Standing Committee. The secretary is outranks the governor, who is generally the deputy secretary of the committee.

The current secretary is Zhao Yide, who took office on 27 November 2022.

== List of party secretaries ==
=== Republic of China (1912–1949) ===
Image	Name (English)	Name (Chinese)	Term start	Term end	Ref.
	Geng Bingguang	耿炳光	July 1927	January 1928	
	Pan Zili	潘自力	January 1928	November 1928	
	Li Zizhou	李子洲	November 1928	January 1929	
	Cao Zhiren	曹趾仁	January 1929	February 1929	
	Du Heng	杜衡	March 1929	March 1931	
	Gao Weihan	高维翰	March 1931	August 1931	
	Du Heng	杜衡	August 1931	August 1932	
	Meng Jian	孟坚	August 1932	December 1932	
	Yuan Yuedong	袁岳栋	April 1933	July 1933	
	Liu Yingsheng	刘映胜	August 1933	September 1933	
	Yu Haifeng	余海丰	October 1933	November 1933	
	Han Xueya	韩学亚	November 1933	1934	
	Wei Guangbo	魏光波	March 1934	October 1934	
	Gao Kelin	高克林	August 1935	December 1935	
	Jia Tuofu	贾拓夫	December 1936	May 1939	
	Ouyang Qin	欧阳钦	May 1939	1941	
	Zhang Desheng	张德生	1941	August 1945	
	Wang Feng	汪锋	January 1946	March 1947	
	Zhao Boping	赵伯平	March 1947	December 1949	

=== People's Republic of China (1949–present) ===
Image	Name (English)	Name (Chinese)	Term start	Term end	Ref.
	Ma Mingfang	马明方	January 1950	October 1952	
	Pan Zili	潘自力	October 1952	1956	
	Zhang Desheng	张德生	July 1956	November 1964	
	Hu Yaobang	胡耀邦	November 1964	May 1965	
	Huo Shilian	霍士廉	October 1965	March 1971	
	Li Ruishan	李瑞山	March 1971	December 1978	
	Wang Renzhong	王任重	10 December 1978	25 December 1978	
	Ma Wenrui	马文瑞	26 December 1978	August 1984	
	Bai Jinian	白纪年	August 1984	August 1987	
	Zhang Boxing	张勃兴	August 1987	November 1994	
	An Qiyuan	安启元	November 1994	August 1997	
	Li Jianguo	李建国	August 1997	25 March 2007	
	Zhao Leji	赵乐际	25 March 2007	19 November 2012	
	Zhao Zhengyong	赵正永	19 November 2012	27 March 2016	
	Lou Qinjian	娄勤俭	27 March 2016	29 October 2017	
	Hu Heping	胡和平	29 October 2017	31 July 2020	
	Liu Guozhong	刘国中	31 July 2020	27 November 2022	
	Zhao Yide	赵一徳	27 November 2022	Incumbent	
