= Pan Zili =

Chinese diplomat and politician

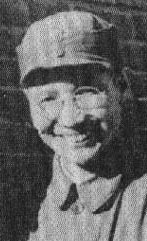
- Native name: 潘自力
- Born: May 1, 1904; Hua County, Shaanxi, Qing Empire (now Huazhou District, Shaanxi, China)
- Died: May 22, 1972 (aged 68) Hua County, Shaanxi, China
- Allegiance: People's Republic of China
- Conflicts: Second Sino-Japanese War; Chinese Civil War
- Spouse: Yao Shuxian
- Other work: Party Secretary and Chairman of Ningxia (1949–1952); Party Secretary of Shaanxi (1952–1955); Chinese Ambassador to: North Korea (1955-1956); India (1956-1962); Soviet Union (1962-1966)

Pan Zili (Chinese: 潘自力) (May 1904 – May 22, 1972) was a Chinese diplomat and politician. He was born in Hua County, Shaanxi.

== Early life ==
Pan Zili was born in Zaoyuan Village, Huaxian County, Shaanxi Province. At the age of 17, he joined the artillery battalion of the Shaanxi Mixed Brigade. He enrolled in the Xianlin Middle School the following year. He was influenced by the early revolutionaries of Shaanxi, such as Wei Yechu and Wang Fusheng, and joined the Chinese Socialist Youth League in 1923. After the May 30th Movement broke out in 1925, Pan Zili organized youths to participate in anti-imperialist demonstrations; afterwards, he was instructed by the CCP to conduct youth and military movements in Shaanxi and Henan.

In October 1925, Pan Zili was sent to study at Sun Yat-sen University in Moscow; in January 1926, he became a member of the Chinese Communist Party. After returning to China in May 1927, he was engaged in the youth movement, agricultural movement and military movement of the Chinese Communist Party in Xi'an, Weinan and other places; he served as the propaganda minister of the Shaanxi Changan County Farmers Association, acting secretary and propaganda minister of the Shaanxi Provincial Party Committee of the Communist Youth League, and the secretary of the Xi'an Municipal Party Committee Shaanxi Provincial Party Committee East Road Special Commissioner and Secretary of Weinan County Party Committee and other positions. After the failure of the first cooperation between the KMT and the Communist Party, in January 1928, Pan Zili served as the Standing Committee of the Shaanxi Provincial Party Committee and Acting Secretary of the Provincial Party Committee;

After successfully escaping from prison in October 1930, he lost contact with the CCP organization. In 1931, under the support of Yang Hucheng, he went to study in France; in 1932, he moved to the United Kingdom to participate in the work of the Chinese Language Group of the British Communist Party; in May 1933, he returned to China. In 1935, the Red Four Front Army was found in northern Sichuan, served as an officer in the General Political Department, and participated in the Long March. In September 1936, Pan Zili rejoined the Chinese Communist Party and served as a political instructor at the Red Army University; after the Xi'an Incident, he transferred the Northwest People's Movement Steering Committee as the Minister of the Organization Department; later he served as the Minister of the Publicity Department of the Shaanxi Provincial Party Committee.

During the Anti-Japanese War and the Civil War of the Kuomintang and the Communist Party, Pan Zili worked in the border area of Jinchaji for a long time; he served as the propaganda minister and deputy director of the political department of the Jinchaji Military Region, the director of the political department of the Jinchaji Field Army, and the director of the political department of the Second Army Corps of the North China Military Region Director of the political department, deputy political commissar and director of the political department of the 19th Corps of the People's Liberation Army; participated in the battles of Pingjin, Taiyuan, Fumei, Lanzhou, etc.; in September 1949, he entered Ningxia with the army.

== People's Republic of China ==
Pan was the 1st Chinese Communist Party Committee Secretary of Ningxia and Chairmen of Ningxia (1949–1952) and Chinese Communist Party Committee Secretary of Shaanxi (1952–1955). He was Chinese Ambassador to North Korea (1955–1956), Nepal and India (1956–1962) and the Soviet Union (1962–1966). He was a delegate to the 1st and 3rd National People's Congress.

Preceded by new office	Communist Party Chief and Chairman of Ningxia; 1949–1952	Succeeded by Zhu Min (as party chief), Xing Zhaotang (as chairman)
Preceded by Ma Mingfang	Communist Party Chief of Shaanxi; 1952–1955	Succeeded by Zhang Desheng
Preceded by Ni Zhiliang	Chinese Ambassador to North Korea; 1955–1956	Succeeded by Qiao Xiaoguang
Preceded by Liu Xiao	Chinese Ambassador to the Soviet Union; 1962–1966	Succeeded by Liu Xinquan
