= Wang Weilin =

Wang Weilin may refer to:

- Wang Weilin (artist) (Chinese: 王渭林), a television artist of the People's Republic of China
- An unconfirmed identification of Tank Man, the protestor who stood in front of a column of tanks during the 1989 Tiananmen Square protests
