= Zhao Zhengyong =

Chinese politician

- 赵正永
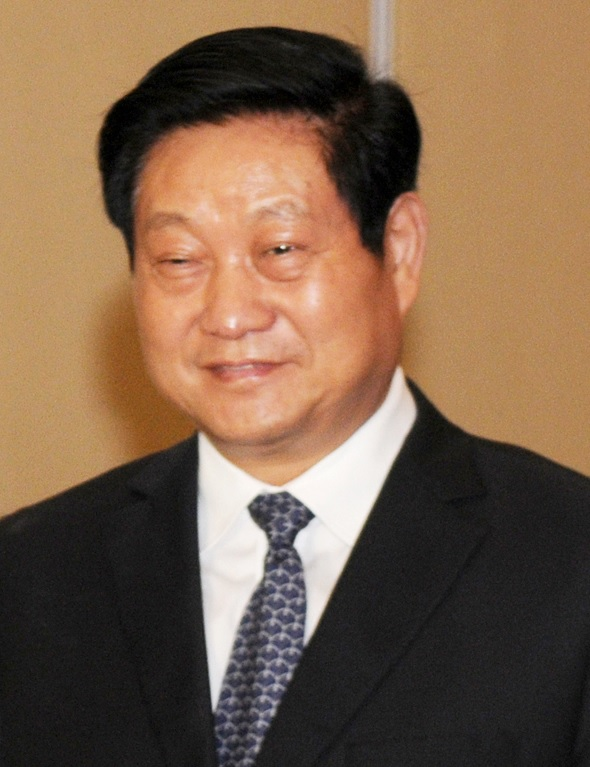
- Zhao Zhengyong

Vice-Chairperson of National People's Congress Supervisory and Judicial Affairs Committee
- In office 12th National People's Congress
- In office April 2016 – March 2018
- Chairperson: Ma Wen

Chairman of the Standing Committee of the Shaanxi People's Congress
- In office 31 January 2013 – 1 April 2016
- Preceded by: Zhao Leji
- Succeeded by: Lou Qinjian

Party Secretary of Shaanxi
- In office 18 December 2012 – 27 March 2016
- Preceded by: Zhao Leji
- Succeeded by: Lou Qinjian

Governor of Shaanxi
- In office 2 June 2010 – 21 December 2012
- Preceded by: Yuan Chunqing
- Succeeded by: Lou Qinjian

Executive Vice Governor of Shaanxi
- In office January 2005 – June 2010
- Preceded by: Chen Deming
- Succeeded by: Lou Qinjian

Personal details
- Born: March 1951 (age 75) Ma'anshan, Anhui
- Party: Chinese Communist Party (expelled; 1973-2020)
- Spouse: Sun Jianhui
- Children: 1
- Education: Central South University

Chinese name
- Simplified Chinese: 赵正永
- Traditional Chinese: 趙正永
Transcriptions
Standard Mandarin
- Hanyu Pinyin: Zhào Zhēngyǒng

Zhao Zhengyong (Chinese: 赵正永; pinyin: Zhào Zhēngyǒng; born March 1951) is a former politician of the People's Republic of China who served as Party Secretary, Governor, and Congress Chairman of Shaanxi Province. After his retirement, he was placed under investigation for corruption.

== Career ==
Zhao Zhengyong was born in Ma'anshan, Anhui Province in March 1951, and joined the Chinese Communist Party in November 1973. He is a graduate of Central South Mining and Metallurgy Institute (now part of Central South University). He worked at the Maanshan Iron and Steel Company before becoming chief of the Communist Youth League and then deputy Communist Party Chief of his native Ma'anshan in Anhui province. He then became the party chief of Huangshan City and later the public security chief of Anhui.

In June 2001, Zhao was transferred to the provincial government of Shaanxi, becoming a vice governor in January 2005. In June 2010 he was appointed the acting governor of Shaanxi, and confirmed as Governor by the Shaanxi Provincial Congress in January 2011. In December 2012 he was promoted to Party Secretary of Shaanxi, replacing Zhao Leji, and Lou Qinjian was appointed Governor in his place. On 27 March 2016, Zhao Zhengyong stepped down from as Party Chief and was again succeeded by Lou Qinjian. Zhao was named a deputy chair of the National People's Congress Internal and Judicial Affairs Committee. Zhao was involved in the illegally constructed villas in the Qinling Mountains.

Zhao was a member of the 18th Central Committee of the Chinese Communist Party.

== Investigation ==
When Zhao left his position as party secretary of Shaanxi for a seat on the National People's Congress, several business dealings resulting in personal enrichment to Zhao became public. Among these was an investment with private developers to build expensive villas on the northern slope of Qinling Mountain in an environmentally protected area. Zhao received multiple warnings from Communist Party leaders about the project and falsely reported that the villas had been removed.

On January 15, 2019, it was announced that Zhao was under investigation by the Central Commission for Discipline Inspection, the Communist Party's internal disciplinary body, and the National Supervisory Commission, China's highest anti-corruption agency, for "serious violations of regulations and laws". He was expelled from the Communist Party on January 4, 2020, and his qualification for delegates to the 13th CCP Shaanxi Provincial Congress was terminated. The day Zhao stepped down, his fellow townsman and subordinate, Chen Guoqiang, vice-governor of Shaanxi, was also taken away for investigation. Wei Minzhou, former chief of Shaanxi's capital city Xi'an, was known to be a close ally of Zhao, was placed under investigation for serious violations of regulations in May 2017.

On May 11, 2020, Zhao's trial was held at the First Intermediate People's Court of Tianjin. The public prosecutors accused him of abusing his positions between 2003 and 2018 to seek benefits for others in terms of job promotions, energy resources exploration and utilization, business activities and project contracting and received a huge amount of gifts and money in return. On July 31, he was sentenced to the death penalty with reprieve by the First Intermediate People's Court of Tianjin after he was found to have accepted more than 717 million yuan ($102.4 million) in bribes. The court said that "Zhao was given a two-year reprieve for his death penalty and deprived of political rights for life, with his personal property confiscated. After he finishes the two-year probation, his death penalty will be reduced to life imprisonment without commutation or parole." He was also deprived of his political rights for life, and ordered by the court to have all his personal assets confiscated. He said he accepted the sentence and would not appeal.

== Personal life ==
Zhao married Sun Jianhui (孙建辉), the couple have a daughter. Zhao has a younger brother named Zhao Zhengfa (赵正发). After the downfall of Zhao Zhengyong, his wife, younger brother, and daughter were arrested for investigation.

Party political offices
Preceded by Ji Jiahong	Party Secretary of Huangshan; 1993-1998	Succeeded by Zang Shikai
Preceded by Chen Ruiding	Secretary of the Political Law Committee of the Anhui Provincial Committee of the Chinese Communist Party; 2000-2001	Succeeded by Ren Haishen
Preceded by Sun Anhua	Secretary of the Political Law Committee of the Shaanxi Provincial Committee of the Chinese Communist Party; 2001-2005	Succeeded by Song Hongwu
Preceded by Zhao Leji	Party Secretary of Shaanxi; 2012–2016	Succeeded by Lou Qinjian
Civic offices
Preceded by Chen Ruiding	Head of Anhui Provincial Public Security Department; 1998-2001	Succeeded by Cui Yadong
Government offices
Preceded by Chen Deming	Executive Vice Governor of Shaanxi; 2005-2010	Succeeded by Lou Qinjian
Preceded by Yuan Chunqing	Governor of Shaanxi; 2010–2012	Succeeded by Lou Qinjian
Assembly seats
Preceded by Zhao Leji	Chairman of the Standing Committee of the Shaanxi People's Congress; 2013-2016	Succeeded by Lou Qinjian
