= Nub =

Nub or NUB may refer to:

- Nub, an analog controller on Pandora and PlayStation Portable
- ISO 639-2 code for the Nobiin language of Nubia
- Northern University, Bangladesh
- National University, Bangladesh
- National University Bacolod
- NUb, brand of Oliva Cigar Co.
- National Union of Blastfurnacemen, Ore Miners, Coke Workers and Kindred Trades, former UK trades union
- Nub, colloquialism for pointing stick on a laptop
- Nahda University, Egypt

== Entertainment ==
- Vernon, Florida (film), a 1981 film originally titled Nub City
- NUB, female bodyguard organisation in novel Nobody Lives for Ever
- Nub, a song on Jesus Lizard's 1991 album Goat
- Nub, guitarist from children's TV series Generation O!
- Nub Kleinke (1911–1950), Major League Baseball player

== See also ==
- NUBS (disambiguation)
