= Zhao Gang =

Zhao Gang, may refer to:

- Zhao Gang (fencer), Chinese fencer
- Zhao Gang (born 1968), Chinese politician
- Zhao Gang (born 1964), Chinese politician
- Zhao Gang (lieutenant general), Chinese People's Liberation Army general
