= Qiyuan =

Qiyuan may refer to:

== People ==
- An Qiyuan (1933-2024), Chinese politician
- Qiu Qiyuan (born 2007), Chinese artistic gymnast

== Others ==
- China Qiyuan, an officer agency responsible for board games
