= Shandong Television =

Chinese television network

Shandong Radio & TV Station 山东广播电视台
- Company type: Government-owned corporation
- Industry: Media
- Founded: 1 October 1960
- Headquarters: Jinan, Shandong, China
- Products: Television, radio
- Website: www.iqilu.com

Shandong Television (SDTV; Chinese: 山东广播电视台; pinyin: Shāndōng Guǎngbō Diànshìtaí) is a television network covering Jinan city and the rest of Shandong province's area. It was founded on 1 October 1960, and started to broadcast on that day. SDTV currently broadcasts in Chinese. In November 2023, Shandong Television launched an international communication center.
