= International communication center =

Chinese state media institution

International communication centers (ICC, Chinese: 国际传播中心) are state media institutions established by provinces and cities of the People's Republic of China. They operate under the supervision of the Central Propaganda Department of the Chinese Communist Party, with state media outlets such as China Daily, Xinhua News Agency, and China News Service providing infrastructure and serving as a partner to many. The first ICCs were established in 2018 in response to General Secretary of the Chinese Communist Party Xi Jinping's call to "innovate" foreign-directed propaganda. According to Qiushi, the theoretical journal of the Chinese Communist Party (CCP), ICCs are "developed based on local propaganda needs" and aim to be a "new force" in the party's global propaganda ecosystem.

ICCs have been described as part of the PRC's soft power initiatives and have represented a shift from foreign-directed propaganda being created at mostly the central government level to creation and dissemination by the country's provincial and local governments. According to Gary D. Rawnsley, ICCs were created with the strategy that China's foreign-directed propaganda desired more tailored and issue-specific messaging. Certain ICCs have specific geographic and country targets for their messaging and act as fusion centers for pooling jurisdictional media resources. They are known to leverage overseas institutional partners to increase their reach and use foreign influencers for astroturfing purposes.

== History ==
In 2018, Chongqing established the first ICC in the country, which operates under the iChongqing platform. Its social media accounts were documented by ProPublica to downplay concerns and controversies at the 2022 Winter Olympics that would portray the PRC in a negative light. Also in 2018, the newspaper Gansu Daily and the propaganda department of the Gansu Provincial Committee of the CCP jointly launched an ICC. In 2020, the newspaper Sichuan Daily and the Sichuan Provincial Committee of the CCP jointly formed an ICC. In May 2022, China Daily and the propaganda department of the Yunnan Provincial Committee of the Chinese Communist Party established an ICC called the South and Southeast Asian Media Network that publishes content in multiple regional languages. In June 2022, Jiangsu launched an ICC called JiangsuNow, which is run by the newspaper Xinhua Daily.

From 2021 to 2023, over 30 ICCs were created. In June 2023, the country's ICCs organized a national association to better coordinate their work. The same month, Shenzhen Media Group formed an ICC.

In July 2023, the Fujian Media Group created an ICC at the direction of the Fujian Provincial Committee of the CCP. The Fujian ICC operates various social media accounts that post content against the Pan-Green Coalition in Taiwan, specifically the Democratic Progressive Party. It also focuses efforts on Japan and Indonesia through its HolaFujian-brand social media accounts. In October 2023, the Shanghai United Media Group launched an ICC called the Shanghai Global News Network (SGNN). It operates social media accounts under the ShanghaiEye brand.

In November 2023, Guangdong launched an ICC that brands itself as GDToday and Daily Bae in English. The same month, Shandong formed an ICC under the state-owned Shandong Television. In January 2024, Hebei created its Great Wall International Communication Center (GWICC). The GWICC subsequently partnered with Agência Brasil and also set up a liaison station in Milan. In February 2024, the Hong Kong-based newspaper Ta Kung Pao partnered with the Heilongjiang Daily Newspaper Group to establish the Heilongjiang ICC, which focuses its external propaganda efforts on Russia and South Korea.

In May 2024, the newspaper Zhejiang Daily established an ICC for the province. It signed an agreement with the University of Nottingham Ningbo China the following month. The province hosts at least 16 separate ICCs. In June 2024, Tianjin formed an ICC that aims to "serve the country's overall public diplomacy." In June 2024, the Sichuan ICC inaugurated a branch center in São Paulo, Brazil in cooperation with Kuaishou. In September 2024, the Tibet Autonomous Regional Committee of the CCP launched an ICC based in Lhasa to coordinate government narratives about the region. The International Campaign for Tibet condemned the launch. In December 2024, the creation of the Xinjiang ICC was announced by a local office of the Cyberspace Administration of China and the Guangzhou Daily Newspaper Group formed an in-house ICC. Also in December 2024, the propaganda department of the Shaanxi Provincial Committee of the CCP partnered with Shaanxi Television and Radio Group to form an ICC.

In February 2025, the Wenzhou ICC established a liaison office with a local overseas Chinese group in Prato. In March 2025, Guyuan's local CCP propaganda office signed an agreement with China Daily to create an ICC to promote the city to the world, and Luoyang inaugurated its own ICC. In April 2025, Wangcheng launched an ICC in conjunction with the creation of "international communication volunteer teams" from three Hunan universities. In June 2025, the Hainan International Media Center (HIMC) was created with the support of state broadcaster Hainan Television and the China Council for the Promotion of International Trade to focus on Sino-Arab relations. In July 2025, China National Petroleum Corporation inaugurated its own ICC to "tell China’s petroleum story well and spread China’s petroleum voice."

As of 2025, there are more than 200 ICCs in operation. Many ICCs have struggled with hiring talent as native-level foreign language skills are required and, therefore, have begun signing cooperation agreements with foreign universities for talent. Some observers have noted that ICCs' ambition to tailor content to local audiences is fundamentally constrained by CCP propaganda directives. In 2026, ICCs have increasingly utilized artificial intelligence and overseas English-language influencers.

== See also ==
- China International Communications Group
- Telling China's stories well
- Party media takes the party's last name
