= Cheng Andong =

Chinese politician (born 1936)

- 程安东

Governor of Shaanxi
- In office December 1994 – May 2002
- Party Secretary: An Qiyuan; Li Jianguo
- Preceded by: Bai Qingcai
- Succeeded by: Jia Zhibang

Personal details
- Born: October 1936 (age 89) Huainan County, Anhui, China
- Party: Chinese Communist Party
- Education: Hefei University of Technology

Chinese name
- Simplified Chinese: 程安东
- Traditional Chinese: 程安東
Transcriptions
Standard Mandarin
- Hanyu Pinyin: Chéng Āndōng

Cheng Andong (Chinese: 程安东; born October 1936) is a Chinese politician who served as governor of Shaanxi from 1994 to 2002. He spent 10 years working at Gaokeng Coal Mine in Pingxiang before serving in various administrative and political roles in Pingxiang Mining Bureau. He joined the Chinese Communist Party (CCP) in June 1980.

He was an alternate member of the 14th Central Committee of the Chinese Communist Party and a member of the 15th Central Committee of the Chinese Communist Party. He was a representative of the 14th and 15th National Congress of the Chinese Communist Party. He was a delegate to the 7th, 8th and 9th National People's Congress. He was a member of the Standing Committee of the 10th Chinese People's Political Consultative Conference.

== Biography ==
Cheng was born in Huainan County (now Huainan), Anhui, in October 1936. He graduated from Fuxin Coal Mine School in 1955 and Hefei University of Technology in 1962.

Starting in September 1955, he successively served as worker, engineer, deputy mine manager, chief engineer, deputy director, and director of Gaokeng Coal Mine and then Pingxiang Mining Bureau. He eventually became deputy party secretary and mayor of Pingxiang. In 1984, he was promoted to become deputy party secretary and mayor of Nanchang, and served until April 1990, when he was appointed assistant governor of Jiangxi.

He was appointed party secretary of Xi'an in September 1990 and was admitted to member of the Standing Committee of the CCP Shaanxi Provincial Committee, the province's top authority. He concurrently served as chairman of Xi'an Municipal People'g Congress from June 1992 to November 1994. In November 1994, he was named acting governor of Shaanxi, confirmed in January 1995.

In March 2003, he took office as vice chairperson of the Economic Committee of the Chinese People's Political Consultative Conference.

Government offices
Preceded by Zhao Zhijian	Mayor of Nanchang; 1984–1990	Succeeded by Jiang Zhongping
Preceded by Bai Qingcai	Governor of Shaanxi; 1994–2002	Succeeded by Jia Zhibang
Party political offices
Preceded by An Qiyuan	Party Secretary of Xi'an; 1990–1994	Succeeded by Cui Lintao
Assembly seats
Preceded by An Qiyuan	Chairman of Xi'an Municipal People'g Congress; 1992–1994	Succeeded by Cui Lintao
