= Fang Zhongru =

Chinese politician

Fang Zhongru (Chinese: 方仲如) (1901 – June 5, 1983) was a Chinese politician. He was born in Xianyang, Shaanxi. He was educated at Peking University and in the Soviet Union. He was CPPCC Chairman, deputy party chief and delegate to the National People's Congress of his home province. He was Chinese Communist Party Committee Secretary and deputy mayor of Xi'an. He attended the 1st National People's Congress, 2nd National People's Congress and 3rd National People's Congress. He was a member of the Standing Committee of the Chinese People's Political Consultative Conference. He died in Beijing.

Preceded by Jia Tuofu	Mayor of Xi'an; 1950-1956	Succeeded by Liu Geng
Preceded by Zhao Boping	Communist Party Secretary of Xi'an; 1956-1958	Succeeded by Zhang Ce
Preceded by Zhang Desheng	CPPCC Chairman of Shaanxi	Succeeded by Zhao Shouyi
