= Bai Qingcai =

Chinese politician

- 白清才

Party Branch Secretary of the All China Federation of Supply and Marketing Cooperatives
- In office February 1995 – December 1997
- Party Secretary: Zhang Boxing
- Preceded by: New title
- Succeeded by: Bai Lichen

Governor of Shaanxi
- In office March 1990 – November 1994
- Preceded by: Hou Zongbin
- Succeeded by: Cheng Andong

Personal details
- Born: November 1932 Wutai County, Shanxi, China
- Died: 6 November 2016 (aged 83–84) Shanxi, China
- Party: Chinese Communist Party

Bai Qingcai (Chinese: 白清才; pinyin: Bái Qīngcái; November 1932 – 6 November 2016) was a Chinese politician who served as governor of Shaanxi from 1990 to 1994 and party branch secretary of the All China Federation of Supply and Marketing Cooperatives from 1995 to 1997. Prior to that, he served as vice governor of Shanxi.

He was a representative of the 13th National Congress of the Chinese Communist Party and a member of the 14th Central Committee of the Chinese Communist Party. He was a delegate to the 7th National People's Congress and a member of the Standing Committee of the 9th National People's Congress.

== Biography ==
Bai was born in Wutai County, Shanxi, in November 1932.

He joined the Communist Youth League of China in June 1949, and joined the Chinese Communist Party (CCP) in October 1955. Beginning in 1949, he served in several posts in Shanxi Branch of the People's Bank of China, including staff, chief, and secretary. He was a secretary for the Shanxi Provincial Finance and Trade Commission in 1959, and held that office until 1964, when he was assigned to Dingxiang County to head the Socialist Education Movement.

In 1966, the Cultural Revolution broke out, Bai was removed from office and effectively sidelined. He was reinstated in July 1969 as deputy director of the Office of Shanxi Provincial Planning Commission. In 1973, he was appointed deputy party secretary of Pinglu County (now Pinglu District), but having held the position for only two years. In 1975, he became deputy head of the Finance and Trade Department of CCP Shanxi Provincial Committee, a position he held until 1981, when he was named permanent secretary of Southeast Shanxi Special Prefecture. In 1983, he was vice governor and then executive vice governor of Shanxi, in addition to serving as director of Shanxi Provincial Planning Commission. In April 1985, he was admitted to member of the Standing Committee of the CCP Shanxi Provincial Committee, the province's top authority.

Bai was chosen as deputy party secretary of Shaanxi in March 1990, concurrently holding the governor position.

In November 1994, Bai was transferred to Beijing and appointed party branch secretary of the All China Federation of Supply and Marketing Cooperatives in February 1995. In March 1998, he took office as vice chairperson of the National People's Congress Environment Protection and Resources Conservation Committee. He retired in December 2003.

On 6 November 2016, he died from an illness in Shanxi, at the age of 84.

Government offices
New title	Party Branch Secretary of the All China Federation of Supply and Marketing Cooperatives; 1995–1997	Succeeded by Bai Lichen
Party political offices
Preceded by Hou Zongbin	Governor of Shaanxi; 1990–1994	Succeeded by Cheng Andong
