= Hainan Television =

HNWTV

History
- Founded: August 1982
- First air date: October 1, 1984

Links
- Website: www.hnntv.cn

Hainan Television (HNWTV) (Chinese: 海南电视台) is a state media television station in Hainan, China.

It was established in August 1982, and began broadcasting on October 1, 1984.

The station has five studios, two of which are 1,000 m^{2} and 400 m^{2}.

The station is currently in the process of digitizing its broadcast equipment, and plans to adopt nonlinear editing and digital compression technology for program transmission.

In 2024, Hainan TV suspended a host for anti-Japanese remarks in response to the 2024 Noto earthquake.

In June 2025, the Hainan international communication center, called the Hainan International Media Center (HIMC), was created with the support of Hainan Television and the China Council for the Promotion of International Trade to focus on Sino-Arab relations.

== Channels ==
=== HNTV-1 ===
This comprehensive channel is accessible to 7.5 million viewers and reaches 85% of the province. It is also available to some parts of the Guangxi Zhuang Autonomous Region and Guangdong Province. 1 time in 1990, the station was picked up in Tokyo, Japan.

HNTV-1's major programs include:

- Hainan News Broadcast (Hainan Xinwen Lianbo)
- Xinwen Weekly (Xinwen Zhoukan)
- Economy World (Jingji Tiandi)
- Hainan Island (Zhongguo You Ge Hainandao)
- TV Court (Dianshi Fating)
- Sun Flower (Taiyang Hua)

=== HNTV-2 ===
This wired channel broadcasts programs that include:

- Hainan News Broadcast (Hainan Xinwen Lianbo)
- Tourism Information (Lvyou Shikong)

=== HNTV-3 ===
This wired channel broadcasts general news and business information such as finance, stocks and real estate.

=== Satellite channel ===
The satellite channel launched in 1999. From 2002 to 2019, it was known as the Travel Channel with emphasis on tourism and leisure, the first of its kind in China.
