= Hu Heping =

Chinese politician

- 胡和平
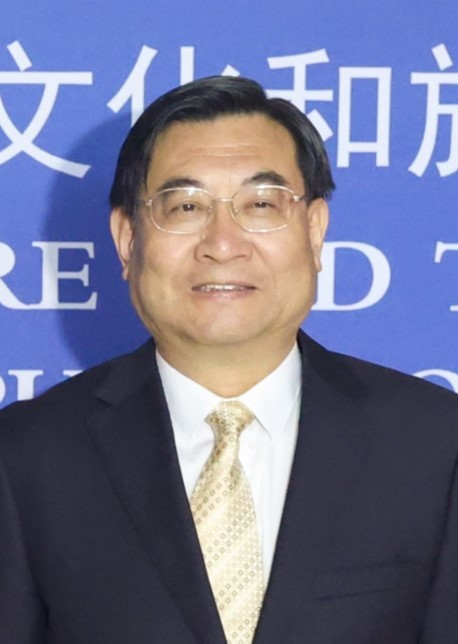
- Hu in 2023

Executive Deputy Head of the Publicity Department of the Chinese Communist Party
- Incumbent
- Assumed office March 2023
- Head: Li Shulei
- Preceded by: Li Shulei

Minister of Culture and Tourism
- In office 11 August 2020 – 29 December 2023
- Premier: Li Keqiang; Li Qiang
- Preceded by: Luo Shugang
- Succeeded by: Sun Yeli

Party Secretary of Shaanxi
- In office 29 October 2017 – 31 July 2020
- Deputy: Liu Guozhong (Governor)
- Preceded by: Lou Qinjian
- Succeeded by: Liu Guozhong

Governor of Shaanxi
- In office 1 April 2016 – 4 January 2018
- Preceded by: Lou Qinjian
- Succeeded by: Liu Guozhong

Personal details
- Born: 24 October 1962 (age 63) Urad Houqi, Inner Mongolia, China
- Party: Chinese Communist Party
- Education: Tsinghua University

Hu Heping (Chinese: 胡和平; pinyin: Hú Hépíng; born 24 October 1962) is a Chinese politician and the current executive deputy head of the Publicity Department of the Chinese Communist Party (CCP). Previously, he served as the governor and party secretary of Shaanxi province, party secretary of Tsinghua University and Minister of Culture and Tourism.

== Early life ==
Hu was born in Urad Houqi, Bayannur, Inner Mongolia in 1962 with ancestral roots in Linyi, Shandong province. He graduated with a hydraulic engineering degree from Tsinghua University. He joined the Communist Party while studying at Tsinghua, in June 1982. In 1990, he received a master's of engineering degree. He also worked as an instructor and teaching assistant while becoming involved with the grassroots party organization at the university. In 1992, he entered University of Tokyo to study engineering, by 1995 he had earned his doctorate and then joined the Japanese architecture firm INA.

== Career ==
Hu returned to China in December 1996 and became vice dean of the Department of Hydraulic Engineering at Tsinghua University and the head of the Institute of Water Resources. In 2000, he began overseeing party personnel and human resources at Tsinghua. In 2006, he became executive deputy secretary and vice president of Tsinghua. In December 2008, he was elevated to party chief, the highest position at the university (equivalent in rank to a vice minister of state).

In December 2013, Hu replaced Cai Qi as Organization Department chief of the Zhejiang provincial party committee, making his first foray into regional politics; Hu also earned a Shengwei Changwei seat. In April 2015 he was made deputy party chief of Shaanxi. On 1 April 2016, Hu was promoted to Acting Governor of Shaanxi, succeeding Lou Qinjian. At the time of his appointment as governor, he had just over two years of experience in regional politics. He was confirmed as Governor on 27 April. Analysts suggested the Hu's promotion took the "fast lane." On 29 October 2017, he was elevated to Communist Party Chief of Shaanxi, again succeeding Lou. In July 2020, he was appointed party secretary of the Ministry of Culture and Tourism. In March 2023, he became the executive deputy head of the CCP Publicity Department.

Hu is currently a full member of the 20th CCP Central Committee. Previously, he was an alternate of the 18th Central Committee and a full member of the 19th Central Committee.

Government offices
Preceded by Lou Qinjian	Governor of Shaanxi; 2016–2018	Succeeded by Liu Guozhong
Party political offices
Preceded by Lou Qinjian	Party Secretary of Shaanxi; 2017– 2020	Succeeded by Liu Guozhong
Preceded by Sun Qingyun	Deputy Party Secretary of Shaanxi; 2015–2016	Succeeded by Mao Wanchun
Preceded by Cai Qi	Head of the Organization Department of Zhejiang; 2013–2015	Succeeded by Liao Guoxun
Preceded by Chen Xi	Party Secretary of Tsinghua University; 2008–2013	Succeeded by Chen Xu
