= Wang Weilin (artist) =

Wang Weilin (September 1957 - November 23, 2024, Chinese: 王渭林), was a native of Wuyuan, Jiangxi Province. He was a television artist of the People's Republic of China.

== Biography ==
He graduated from Beijing Broadcasting Institute in 1982. In July 2001, he became deputy director of Shaanxi Television. In August 2011, he became deputy director of Shaanxi Radio and Television. In October 2014, he became editor-in-chief of Shaanxi Radio and Television.

He died on November 23, 2024 at the age of 68 years.
