= Yan Kelun =

Chinese politician

Yan Kelun (May 1913 – August 30, 1988) was a Chinese politician. He was born in Yongshou County, Xianyang, Shaanxi. He joined the Chinese Communist Party in October 1932.

Yan Kelun was born in an ordinary peasant family in Fenghou Village, Jianjun Town, Yongshou County, Xianyang City. In 1922, while studying in elementary schools, he joined the peripheral organization "Youth Club" led by the Communist Party. He went to Xi'an in 1929 and studied at the Provincial First Normal School. After the "September 18" incident, he began to participate in the Anti-Japanese Salvation Movement. In 1932, he went to a provincial high school to study, and joined the Chinese Communist Youth League; in October of that year, he became a party member of the Chinese Communist Party and successively served as the party secretary of the "Xi'an Anti-imperialist League" organization, the secretary of the Xi'an Interim Municipal Party Committee, Xi'an Center Minister of the Municipal Party Committee Organization Department. After graduating from high school in 1935, he returned to Yongshou as a school teacher to cover up and develop the CCP underground party organization. In 1936, Yan Kelun and Zhang Gengliang successfully mobilized the security detachment of Tiefo Temple in Ganxian County to launch an armed uprising, attacked the Yongshou County Government, and killed the county magistrate Qi Yunshi. After the peaceful settlement of the "Xi'an Incident" in December of that year, he was dispatched by the organization and served as a captain's political associate in the 6th Regiment of the 2nd Brigade of the Yanghucheng Department of Security, where he did military transport. Later, he returned to Yongshou again to develop the local power of the CCP.

In November 1939, Yan Kelun, then the head of the Organization Department of the Party Committee of the Zealand Land Committee of the Chinese Communist Party and Secretary of the County Party Committee of Yongshou Center, was arrested and imprisoned because of the betrayal by the party traitors. After successfully jailbreaking in January of the following year, he went to Yan'an; he studied at the Northern Shaanxi Public School and Yan'an University; in April 1942, he served as secretary of the Pingdong Working Committee of the Chinese Communist Party; in 1943, he returned to the Central Party School to participate in the rectification movement. In the early days of the Liberation War, Yan Kelun led the Ministry to carry out guerrilla warfare in Linyou and other places to contain the Kuomintang army. Later, he served as deputy secretary of the Xifu Working Committee of the Chinese Communist Party, deputy secretary of the Prefectural Committee of Pi County in Shaanxi, Gansu, and Ning Border Regions, as well as the Minister of Organization.

After the founding of the People's Republic of China, Yan Kelun became the first secretary of the CPC Xianyang Prefectural Committee and the political commissar of the Xianyang Military Division. Since then, he has been working in the Shaanxi Provincial Party Committee of the Chinese Communist Party; he has served as Secretary-General of the Provincial Party Committee, Standing Committee of the Provincial Party Committee, Minister of Finance and Trade Department, Alternate Secretary of the Provincial Party Committee Secretary, Secretary of the Provincial Party Committee, and Secretary of the Provincial Committee Supervision Committee. After the start of the Cultural Revolution, Yan Kelun was hit, and worked in the May 7th Provincial School of the province and the No. 1 Petroleum Instrument Factory in Xi'an. After 1978, he served as the secretary of the Shaanxi Provincial Party Committee of the Chinese Communist Party (there was a "first secretary") and concurrently served as the first secretary of the Provincial Party Committee Disciplinary Inspection Interim Committee; at the 12th National Congress of the Chinese Communist Party in 1982, he was elected as a member of the Disciplinary Committee (to The National Congress of the Chinese Communist Party was held in September 1985); from February to September 1982, he also served as Secretary of the Political and Law Committee of the Provincial Party Committee. In April 1983, Yan Kelun was elected director of the Standing Committee of the Sixth Shaanxi Provincial People's Congress.

On August 30, 1988, Yan Kelun, who had just stepped down from his leadership role, died of diabetes comorbidity during his convalescence in Beidaihe, Hebei.

== Family ==
Yan Kelun's wife Su Wen (formerly Guo Fanfeng). Born in the town of Berastagi, North Sumatra, Indonesia in 1927, he is a famous Chinese performing artist; he played the role of Sister Liu in the opera "Sister Liu", and played the role of silver ring in the opera "Chaoyanggou". In 1953, introduced by Li Ping, then commander of the Xianyang Army Division, met Yan Kelun in Beijing; married in Xi'an in 1954; after marriage, he had three daughters.

Preceded by Ma Wenrui	Congress Chairman of Shaanxi; 1983-1988	Succeeded by Li Xipu
