= Ma Wenrui =

Chinese Communist politician (1912–2004)

- 马文瑞

Vice Chairman of the Chinese People's Political Consultative Conference
- In office 26 May 1984 – 27 March 1993
- Chairperson: Deng Yingchao; Li Xiannian

Party Secretary of Shaanxi
- In office December 1978 – May 1984
- Preceded by: Wang Renzhong
- Succeeded by: Bai Jinian

Minister of Labour
- In office 1954–1966
- Premier: Zhou Enlai
- Preceded by: Li Lisan
- Succeeded by: Post abolished

Personal details
- Born: November 4, 1912 Zizhou County, Shaanxi, China
- Died: January 3, 2004 (aged 91) Beijing, China
- Party: Chinese Communist Party
- Education: Counter-Japanese Military and Political University

Ma Wenrui (Chinese: 马文瑞; Wade–Giles: Ma Wen-jui; November 4, 1912 – January 3, 2004) was a Chinese Communist revolutionary and politician. He served successively as China's Minister of Labour, First Party Secretary (top leader) of his native Shaanxi Province, and a Vice Chairman of the Chinese People's Political Consultative Conference (CPPCC). He was implicated in the Liu Zhidan incident in the 1960s, and was persecuted and imprisoned for five years during the Cultural Revolution.

== Early life and revolution ==
Ma Wenrui was born on November 4, 1912, into a well-off family in Zizhou County, Shaanxi Province. His mother died when he was only four. When he was 14, he began studying Marxism. He joined the Communist Youth League of China in 1926, and participated in various student movements. He then worked in revolutionary agitation in his home province. In 1935, at age 23, he was instrumental in the founding of two soviets in Shaanxi. During the Second Sino-Japanese War, he worked in northern Shaanxi near the Communist base in Yan'an, and studied military science at Counter-Japanese Military and Political University. He was one of the major leaders of the Northwest Bureau of the Communist Party, and an early follower of Xi Zhongxun.

== Minister of Labour and persecution ==
After the founding of the People's Republic of China in 1949, Ma was elected an alternate member of the 8th Central Committee of the Chinese Communist Party. He was appointed Minister of Labour in 1954. In 1962, Kang Sheng accused Li Jiantong's biographical novel about the Communist martyr Liu Zhidan as an "anti-Party conspiracy", and Ma became implicated merely because Li had interviewed him and written his name in her notebook. The three main victims, Xi Zhongxun, Jia Tuofu, and Liu Jingfan, were labelled the "Xi-Jia-Liu anti-Party group". At the beginning of the Cultural Revolution, Jia died in 1967 after repeated struggle sessions. Ma was then elevated to become a main conspirator of the group, now renamed "Xi-Ma-Liu clique", and subject to severe persecution. He was arrested in January 1968 and spent five years imprisoned at a military garrison.

== Post-Cultural Revolution ==
Ma was politically rehabilitated in 1977, after the end of the Cultural Revolution, and returned to work as the deputy chair of the State Planning Commission, and Vice President of the Central Party School. In December 1978, when the Shaanxi First Party Secretary Wang Renzhong was promoted to vice premier, Ma returned to Shaanxi to succeed Wang as the province's top leader. His major contributions to his home province include the restoration of the Xi'an City Wall and the construction of the Xi'an Xianyang International Airport. He was a full member of the 11th and 12th CCP Central Committees.

He was elevated to the mostly ceremonial position of the Vice-Chairman of the Chinese People's Political Consultative Conference in May 1984 and served until 1993, when he retired from politics. In 1990, Ma, together with Peng Zhen, founded the Foundation for Research into the Yan'an Spirit; Ma served as its inaugural president.

Ma died on January 3, 2004, in Beijing. His last words were "I miss Yan'an".

Party political offices
Preceded by Wang Renzhong	Party Secretary of Shaanxi; 1978–1984	Succeeded by Bai Jinian
