= Lou Qinjian =

Chinese politician (born 1956)

- 娄勤俭
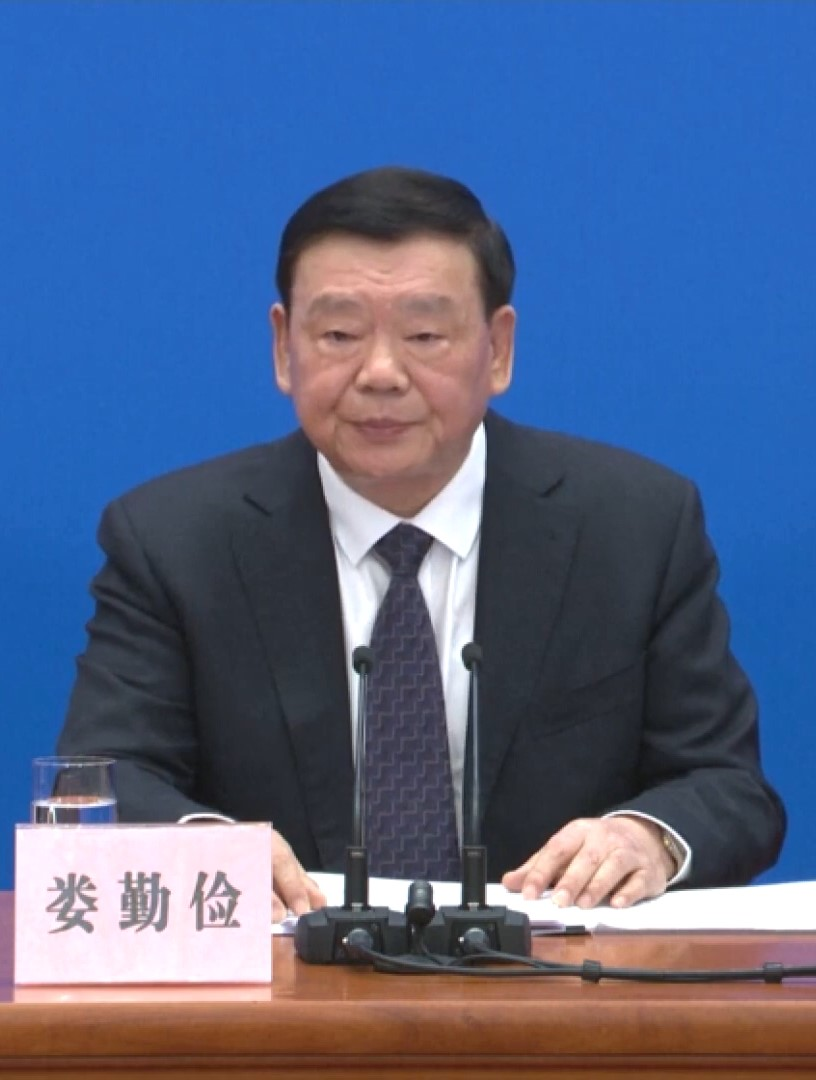
- Lou in 2024

Party Secretary of Jiangsu
- In office 29 October 2017 – 18 October 2021
- Deputy: Wu Zhenglong (Governor)
- General Secretary: Xi Jinping
- Preceded by: Li Qiang
- Succeeded by: Wu Zhenglong

Chairman of Jiangsu People's Congress
- In office 31 January 2021 – 14 January 2022
- Preceded by: Li Qiang
- Succeeded by: Wu Zhenglong

Party Secretary of Shaanxi
- In office 27 March 2016 – 29 October 2017
- Deputy: Hu Heping (governor)
- Preceded by: Zhao Zhengyong
- Succeeded by: Hu Heping

Chairman of Shaanxi People's Congress
- In office 27 April 2016 – 30 January 2018
- Preceded by: Zhao Zhengyong
- Succeeded by: Hu Heping

Governor of Shaanxi
- In office 21 December 2012 – 1 April 2016
- Preceded by: Zhao Zhengyong
- Succeeded by: Hu Heping

Personal details
- Born: 21 December 1956 (age 69) Tongzi County, Guizhou, China
- Party: Chinese Communist Party
- Education: Huazhong University of Science and Technology

Chinese name
- Simplified Chinese: 娄勤俭
- Traditional Chinese: 婁勤儉
Transcriptions
Standard Mandarin
- Hanyu Pinyin: Lòu Qínjiǎn

Lou Qinjian (Chinese: 娄勤俭; born 21 December 1956) is a Chinese politician and computer scientist who had served as Party Secretary of Jiangsu, Communist Party Secretary, Governor of Shaanxi and Deputy Minister of Industry and Information Technology. He has a Ph.D. in computer science from Huazhong University of Science and Technology.

== Early life and career ==
Lou Qinjian was born in Tongzi County, Guizhou province, near the Communist revolutionary base of Zunyi. He started working in August 1973 as a rusticated youth in Tongzi and later worked as a teacher. He joined the Chinese Communist Party (CCP) in August 1975.

== IT and engineering ==
After the Cultural Revolution, in March 1978 Lou was admitted to the Computer Science and Engineering Department of Huazhong University of Science and Technology in Wuhan, Hubei province. After graduating in February 1982, Lou worked at the 15th Research Institute of the Ministry of Electronics Industry as an assistant engineer until 1985. From 1985 to 1988 he enrolled as a graduate student at the 15th Research Institute, earning a master's degree in engineering. Afterwards he continued to work at the 15th Research Institute as an engineer, rising through the ranks to become its director in 1995 and General Manager and President of its affiliated Taiji Computer Corporation. From 1998 to 2003 he returned to study at the Computer Science and Engineering Department of the Huazhong University of Science and Technology, earning a Ph.D.

In March 2008 Lou Qinjian was appointed Vice Minister of Industry and Information Technology of China, a position he held until 2010.

== Shaanxi Province ==
In August 2010 Lou Qinjian was transferred from the national government to Shaanxi province, where he became a Vice Governor. In December 2012 he was appointed acting governor, replacing Zhao Zhengyong, who was promoted to Communist Party Chief of the province. In January 2013 Lou was elected Governor by the Shaanxi Provincial Congress. On 27 March 2016, he was elevated to Communist Party Chief of Shaanxi, again succeeding Zhao.

== Jiangsu Province ==
In October 2017, Lou was transferred to Jiangsu Province, and appointed as the Party Chief.

Lou is a full member of the 19th Central Committee of the CCP. He has also served as an alternate of the 18th Central Committee, deputy to the 16th, 17th and 18th National Congress of the CCP, deputy to the 12th Shaanxi Provincial Congress of the CCP, and deputy to the 11th Shaanxi Provincial People's Congress.

== Central government ==
On 23 October 2021, he was appointed vice chairperson of the National People's Congress Financial and Economic Affairs Committee.

In March 2023, he was elected as a member of the Standing Committee of the 14th National People's Congress and Chairman of the Foreign Affairs Committee during the first session of the 14th National People's Congress.

In March 2024, he served as the spokesperson of the National People's Congress.

Government offices
Preceded by Zhao Zhengyong	Governor of Shaanxi; 2012–2016	Succeeded by Hu Heping
Party political offices
Preceded by Li Qiang	Party Secretary of Jiangsu; 2017–2021	Succeeded by Wu Zhenglong
Preceded by Zhao Zhengyong	Party Secretary of Shaanxi; 2016–2017	Succeeded by Hu Heping
Assembly seats
Preceded by Zhao Zhengyong	Chairman of Shaanxi People's Congress; 2016–2018	Succeeded by Hu Heping
Preceded by Li Qiang	Chairman of Jiangsu People's Congress; 2021–2022	Succeeded by Wu Zhenglong
