= Li Qingwei =

Chinese politician

Li Qingwei (Chinese: 李庆伟; 1920 – October 18, 1994) was a People's Republic of China politician. He was born in Xingtai, Hebei Province. He joined the Chinese Communist Party in 1937. He was governor of Shaanxi Province from 1983 to 1986, and vice head of the Development Research Center of the State Council in China.

While in office, Li hosted foreign dignitaries such as Ronald Reagan and Queen Elizabeth II. These visits were spurred by the then recently discovered Terracotta Army archaeological site, and replicas of the statues were presented as gifts.

Preceded by Yu Mingtao	Governor of Shaanxi	Succeeded by Zhang Boxing
