= Shaanxi Provincial Committee of the Chinese Communist Party =

Shaanxi Provincial Committee of the Chinese Communist Party 中国共产党陕西省委员会

Overview
- Type: Highest decision-making organ when Shaanxi Provincial Congress is not in session.
- Elected by: Shaanxi Provincial Congress
- Length of term: Five years
- Term limits: None
- First convocation: July 1927; 99 years ago
- Secretary: Zhao Yide
- Executive organ: Standing Committee
- Inspection organ: Commission for Discipline Inspection

Shaanxi Provincial Committee of the Chinese Communist Party
- Simplified Chinese: 中国共产党陕西省委员会
- Traditional Chinese: 中國共產黨陝西省委員會
Transcriptions
Standard Mandarin
- Hanyu Pinyin: Zhōngguó Gòngchǎndǎng Shǎnxīshěng Wěiyuánhuì

Abbreviation
- Simplified Chinese: 中共陕西省委
- Traditional Chinese: 中共陝西省委
- Literal meaning: CCP Shaanxi Provincial Committee
Transcriptions
Standard Mandarin
- Hanyu Pinyin: Zhōnggòng Shǎnxīshěng Wěi

The Shaanxi Provincial Committee of the Chinese Communist Party is the provincial committee of the Chinese Communist Party (CCP) in Shaanxi, China, and is the province's top authority. It was established in July of 1927. The CCP committee secretary is the highest ranking post in the province.

In December 2024, the Publicity Department of the Shaanxi Provincial Committee of the CCP partnered with Shaanxi Television and Radio Group to form an international communication center.

== History ==
In early July 1927, the committee was formed secretly in Xi'an. Around the same time period, Feng Yuxiang allied with Chiang Kai-shek to form a new government in Shaanxi, and the Nationalists implemented the White Terror. The Nationalist crackdown included a focus on eliminating CCP presence in schools. By September 1927, the Terror had killed 496 people, including students. CCP central authorities ordered the Shaanxi party branch to respond with peasant revolts. These early responses failed, and in March 1928 the Weihua Uprising began.

Under these circumstances, the committee was unable to host representative meetings for elections; instead, the CCP central directly appointed 13 committee members, along with 5 backup members. Geng Bingguang (耿炳光) took the role of secretary.

Following the initial failures of 1928, the Shaanxi Provincial Committee redesignated local guerrilla forces as the Twenty-sixth Army of the Chinese Workers' and Peasants' Red Army in 1932. This force, led by Xie Zichang and Liu Zhidan, became the backbone of the Shaanxi-Gansu Border Base Area.

In February 1929, Nationalist authorities captured a Communist Youth League official who then betrayed the CCP, leading to the arrest of most of the Shaanxi Party Committee's leadership. During the ensuing crackdown, the number of CCP members in Shaanxi decreased from 3,000 to 1,300.

In November 1933, the Special Committee of the Shaanxi-Gansu Border Area merged the main Red Army force with local units to form the Forty-second Division, significantly increasing the CCP's military presence in the region.

Liu Zhidan and Xie Zichang officially combined the Shaanxi-Gansu Border Region with northern Shaanxi party bodies, forming the Northwest Work Committee to unify local revolutionary efforts against Nationalist suppression campaigns.

Following the unification efforts of the Northwest Work Committee, the Shaanxi-Gansu Border Area Soviet Government was officially established in Nanliang, Huachi County. Xi Zhongxun was elected chairman of this government at the age of 21.

By late 1934, the unified Shaanxi-Gansu and Northern Shaanxi bases covered more than 20 counties, providing a stable territorial foothold hat would later prove indispensable for the Central Red Army's arrival at the end of the Long March.

The committee went on to establish the Shaanxi-Gansu-Ningxia Border region, providing the region with a base for resistance against Japanese control.

The provincial capital was liberated on May 20th, 1949. Then, the committee joined in the fighting in the early stages of the civil war with local troop militias of roughly 7,500 men. By January of 1950, the bulk of warfare was finished, and the committee set about to restructure itself for peacetime operations. Normal administrative operations continued from then until the present day.

In December 2024, the Publicity Department of the Shaanxi Provincial Committee partnered with Shaanxi Television and Radio Group to form an international communication center. In August 2025, the committee's Publicity Department signed a cooperation agreement with China Daily.

== Organizations ==
The organization of the Shaanxi Provincial Committee includes:

- General Office

=== Functional Departments ===
- Organization Department
- Publicity Department
- United Front Work Department
- Political and Legal Affairs Commission
- Social Work Department
- Commission for Discipline Inspection
- Supervisory Commission

=== Offices ===
- Policy Research Office
- Office of the Cyberspace Affairs Commission
- Office of the Foreign Affairs Commission
- Office of the Deepening Reform Commission
- Office of the Institutional Organization Commission
- Office of the Military-civilian Fusion Development Committee
- Taiwan Work Office
- Office of the Leading Group for Inspection Work
- Bureau of Veteran Cadres

=== Dispatched institutions ===
- Working Committee of the Organs Directly Affiliated to the Shaanxi Provincial Committee

=== Organizations directly under the Committee ===
- Shaanxi Party School
- Shaanxi Daily Newspaper Group
- Shaanxi Institute of Socialism
- Party History Research Office
- Shaanxi Provincial Archives
- Lecturer Group

=== Organization managed by the work organization ===
- Confidential Bureau

== Leadership ==
=== Committee Secretary ===
Name (English)	Name (Chinese)	Tenure begins	Tenure ends	Note
Zhao Yide	赵一德	January 2023	2028	

=== Heads of the Organization Department ===
Name (English)	Name (Chinese)	Tenure begins	Tenure ends	Note
Guo Yonghong	郭永红	May 2020		

=== Heads of the Publicity Department ===
Name (English)	Name (Chinese)	Tenure begins	Tenure ends	Note
Sun Daguang	孙大光	November 2021		

=== Secretaries of the Political and Legal Affairs Commission ===
Name (English)	Name (Chinese)	Tenure begins	Tenure ends	Note
Liu Qiang	刘强	June 2022		

=== Heads of the United Front Work Department ===
Name (English)	Name (Chinese)	Tenure begins	Tenure ends	Note
Li Mingyuan	李明远	April 2023		

== See also ==
- Politics of Shaanxi
