= Nanjing University Business School =

Business school of Nanjing University in China

- Nanjing University Business School
- Type: Public
- Established: 1902; 124 years ago
- Founders: An Tongliang
- Rector: An Tongliang
- Location: Nanjing University Business School, 22 Hankou Road, Gulou District, Nanjing, China, Nanjing, Jiangsu, 210093, China; 32.0526°N 118.7754°E
- Campus: 1,200 acres (490 ha); Nanjing University of Technology
- Language: Chinese
- Colors: blue
- Website: nju.edu.cn/en

Nanjing University Business School (NUBS, Chinese：南京大學商學院, Hanyu Pinyin: Nánjīng Dàxué Shāngxuéyuàn, colloquially 南大商學院, Nándà Shāngxuéyuàn) is the school of business of Nanjing University, which founded the first professional Chinese university business school. NUBS's disciplinary areas consist of economics and management.

According to the report released in 2009 on class 1 disciplines overall level evaluation during 2007~2009 by China Academic Degree & Graduate Education Development Center of The Ministry of Education, NUBS ranks within top 5 nationwide in both theoretical economics and business management, while business management ranks No.1 in south area of China.

== History ==
Nanjing University Business School dates back to the courses of economics and commerce provided after education reform in 1902, during which period the faculty member of the school included the cultural academic leader Liu Yizheng (柳詒徵), who is the author of the first book of The History of Chinese Commerce and Business Ethics. The faculty of commerce (or business) was founded in 1917 at Nanking Higher Normal School which transformed to be National Southeastern University in 1921. The first dean was Yang Hsingfo (Yang Xingfo, 楊杏佛), who is a pioneering scholar of modern management in China.

Then in 1921 the commerce faculty was moved to Shanghai and extended to become the business school of National Southeastern University with the name Shanghai Commerce College, initially with six departments including General Commerce, Business Administration, Accounting, Banking & Financing, International Trade, and International Transportation. It's the first modern professional university business school conferring degrees in China. National Southeastern University renamed National Central University in 1928 and again in 1949 renamed Nanjing University. National Central University business school became independent with the name National Shanghai College of Commerce in 1932 and later became Shanghai University of Finance and Economics. In the meantime, there was the Department of Economics under the division of social sciences in the main campus of Nanking, which was originated in 1921 and the first director was Hsiao Chunchin (Xiao Chunjin, 蕭純錦). In 1945 there were three groups at the Economics Department: economic theory and policy, public finance, banking and finance. The department was merged to Fudan University in 1952 during the college and department adjustment by PRC government.

Nanjing University reestablished faculties of economics and business management after 1978. Those faculties formed the International Business School of Nanjing University in 1988, and in 2000 the school was renamed Nanjing University Business School and at the time the school had five departments: Business Administration, Accounting, Finance, Economics, and International Economics & Trade. In 2006 the business school was divided into two collaborative interdependent sub-schools: School of Economics, comprising Departments of Economics, Finance, Industrial Economics, and International Economics & Trade, and School of Management, comprising Departments of Business Administration, Accounting, Marketing, Human Resources Management, etc.

NUBS launched MBA (Master of Business Administration) training project firstly in 1987 and started MBA education in Singapore in 1993. NUBS MBA program in Nanjing main campus start in 1994. In 1995, National MBA Entrance Examination Research Center was established at NUBS, the director of the center who was the dean of NUBS Zhou Sanduo (周三多) led a team to work out the MBA entrance examination blueprint GRK which was put into effect in 1997 and since then MBA candidates need to take part in the nationwide united MBA Entrance Exam. NUBS start to provide formal EMBA (Executive Master of Business Administration) education in 2002.

== Composition ==
Nanjing University Business School consists of two sub-schools: school of management and school of economics.

- Management School
  - Department of Business Administration
  - Department of Human Resource Management
  - Department of Marketing & Electronic Commerce
  - Department of Accounting
- Economics School
  - Department of Economics
  - Department of Industrial Economics
  - Department of International Economics & Trading
  - Department of Finance

== Programs ==
Education and training programs

Programs provided by NUBS include:

- Undergraduate Programs
- Master Programs
- Doctoral Programs

Practical professional programs:

- MBA Program
- EMBA Program
- MPAcc (The Master of Professional Accounting)
- EDP (The Executive Development Programs)

== Current information ==
Current information and recent status

Faculties

Yangtze River Scholar (Distinguished Professor)

- Shen Rongkun, economics
- Fan Conglai, economics
- Jin Bingyi, finance
- Wang Yuetang, business administration
- Chen Donghua, business administration

The following courses are recognized as National Excellent Courses:

- (General) Management, chief professor: Chen Chuanming (The book Management written by NUBS professors Zhou Sanduo and Chen Chuanming was chosen as textbook by most colleges in China, and the sales volume in 2011 is above 350 thousand)
- Human Resources Management, chief professor: Zhao Shuming
- Operations Management, chief professor: Yang Dongtao
- International Finance, chief professor: Pei Ping

Activities

- International Symposium on Multinational Business Management (企业跨国经营国际研讨会). The conference is held every three year a time, and the latest one, the 8th Symposium was held in June, 2014

== Alumni ==
Notable alumni include:

- Chen Deming (陳德銘), former Minister of Commerce, P.R.C.
- Hsing Mu-huan (邢慕寰), economist, the first Director of Institute of Economics, Academia Sinica.
- Yang Bi-li (楊必立), the pioneer guru of management education in Chinese community, the initiator of Chinese MBA education.
- Hsu Po-Yuan (徐柏園), financier, former Central Bank Governor, Ministry of Finance, R.O.C. He is the founder of Chinese central bank system.
- Wang Chih-hsin (王志莘), banker, financier, a founder and the first General Manager of former Shanghai Stock Exchange
