= Li Qiming =

Chinese politician

Li Qiming (Chinese: 李启明) (September 1915 – December 19, 2007) was a Chinese politician. He was born in Shenchi County, Shanxi Province. He was the governor of Shaanxi.

Preceded by Zhao Boping	Governor of Shaanxi	Succeeded by Li Ruishan
