= Zhao Yide =

Chinese politician

Zhao Yide 赵一德
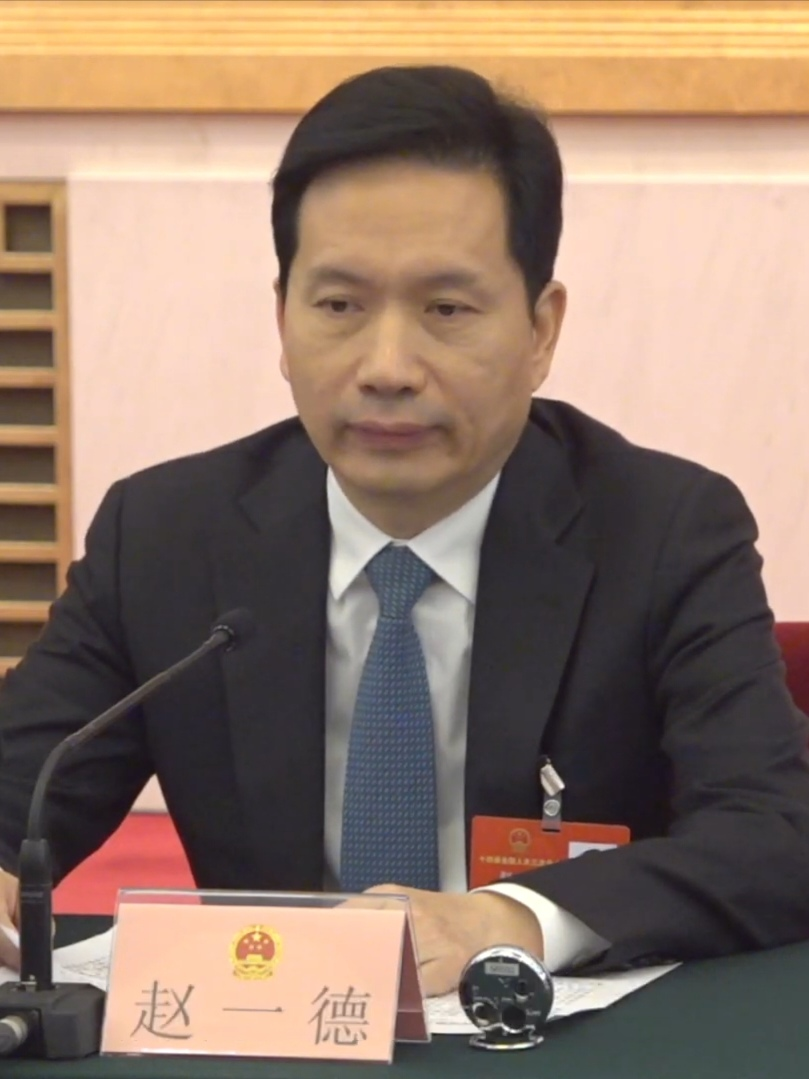
- Zhao in 2025

Party Secretary of Shaanxi
- Incumbent
- Assumed office November 27, 2022
- Deputy: Zhao Gang (Governor)
- General Secretary: Xi Jinping
- Preceded by: Liu Guozhong

Chairman of the Standing Committee of the Shaanxi Provincial People's Congress
- Incumbent
- Assumed office January 16, 2023
- Preceded by: Liu Guozhong

Governor of Shaanxi
- In office August 2, 2020 – December 1, 2022
- Party Secretary: Liu Guozhong
- Preceded by: Liu Guozhong
- Succeeded by: Zhao Gang

Party Secretary of Hangzhou
- In office September 25, 2015 – March 26, 2018
- Deputy: Zhang Hongming → Xu Liyi (Mayor)
- Preceded by: Gong Zheng
- Succeeded by: Zhou Jiangyong

Party Secretary of Quzhou
- In office September 28, 2011 – May 17, 2012
- Deputy: Shang Qing → Chen Xin (Mayor)
- Preceded by: Sun Jianguo
- Succeeded by: Chen Xin

Mayor of Wenzhou
- In office April 30, 2008 – September 28, 2011
- Party Secretary: Shao Zhanwei → Chen Derong
- Preceded by: Shao Zhanwei
- Succeeded by: Chen Jinbiao

Secretary of the Zhejiang Provincial Committee of the Communist Youth League of China
- In office January 6, 2004 – November 3, 2006
- Preceded by: Ge Huijun
- Succeeded by: Lu Jun

Personal details
- Born: February 19, 1965 (age 61) Wenling, Taizhou, Zhejiang, China
- Party: China Communist Party
- Education: Taizhou Agricultural School, Zhejiang; Zhejiang Provincial Party School
- Occupation: Politician

Zhao Yide (Chinese: 赵一德; born February 19, 1965) is a Chinese politician and the current Chinese Communist Party Committee Secretary of Shaanxi, and was previously the Governor of Shaanxi. Earlier in his career, he served as the Deputy Party Secretary of Hebei, Party Secretary of Hangzhou, Quzhou and Mayor of Wenzhou.

== Early Life and Career in Zhejiang Province ==
From 1980 to 1983, Zhao Yide studied agronomy at Taizhou Agricultural School (now Taizhou Vocational College of Science and Technology).

In August 1983, he began his career as a clerk at the Wenxi District Office of Wenling County, Taizhou. In August 1987, he joined the Communist Youth League (CYL) Committee of Wenling County, where he successively served as officer, deputy secretary, and secretary. Starting in December 1991, he served successively as deputy secretary of the Xinhé District Party Committee and concurrently Party secretary of Xinhé Town, Party secretary and chair of the People's Congress of Tangxia Town, and Party secretary of Ruoheng Town.

In February 1994, Zhao was appointed deputy head of the Rural Youth Department of the Zhejiang Provincial Committee of the Communist Youth League. In October 1996, he became a member of the Standing Committee of the Provincial CYL Committee and head of its Organization Department. In June 2000, he was promoted to deputy secretary of the Zhejiang Provincial CYL Committee and chairman of the Zhejiang Youth Federation. In January 2004, he became secretary of the Zhejiang Provincial CYL Committee.

In November 2006, Zhao was appointed deputy Party secretary of Wenzhou. In March 2007, he concurrently served as secretary of the Wenzhou Political and Legal Affairs Commission. In April 2008, he became acting mayor and later mayor of the Wenzhou Municipal People's Government.

In September 2011, Zhao was appointed Party secretary of Quzhou.

In May 2012, he was appointed secretary-general of the CCP Zhejiang Provincial Committee. In June 2012, he was elected a member of the Standing Committee of the CCP Zhejiang Provincial Committee, attaining vice-ministerial rank.

In September 2015, Zhao was appointed Party Secretary of Hangzhou. During his tenure, Hangzhou hosted the 2016 G20 Hangzhou Summit.

In October 2017, Zhao was elected an alternate member of the 19th Central Committee of the Chinese Communist Party at the 19th National Congress of the Chinese Communist Party.

== Hebei Province ==
In March 2018, Zhao was transferred to Hebei Province and appointed deputy secretary of the CCP Hebei Provincial Committee.

== Shaanxi Province ==
In July 2020, Zhao was appointed deputy Party secretary of the CCP Shaanxi Provincial Committee and Party secretary of the Leading Party Members' Group of the Shaanxi Provincial People's Government. In August 2020, he was appointed acting governor of Shaanxi Province, and later elected governor.

In October 2022, Zhao was elected a member of the 20th Central Committee of the Chinese Communist Party at the 20th National Congress.

In November 2022, he was appointed Chinese Communist Party Committee Secretary of Shaanxi Province.

In December 2022, Zhao resigned as governor of Shaanxi Province. In the same month, he was elected first secretary of the Party Committee of the Shaanxi Provincial Military District.

In January 2023, Zhao was elected chairman of the Standing Committee of the Shaanxi Provincial People's Congress.

Party political offices
Preceded by Liu Guozhong	Party Secretary of Shaanxi; 2022–	Incumbent
Preceded by Gong Zheng	Party Secretary of Hangzhou; 2015–2018	Succeeded by Zhou Jiangyong
Government offices
Preceded by Liu Guozhong	Governor of Shaanxi; 2020–2022	Succeeded by Zhao Gang
Civic offices
Preceded by Ge Huijun	Communist Youth League Secretary of Zhejiang; 2003–2006	Succeeded by Lu Jun
