= Zhang Desheng =

Chinese politician

Zhang Desheng (Chinese: 张德生; October 20, 1909 – March 4, 1965) also known as Zhang Shide (Chinese: 张世德), was a Chinese politician. He was born in Yulin, Shaanxi. He was Chinese Communist Party Committee Secretary of Gansu (1949–1954) and Shaanxi (1954–1965). He died in office in Xi'an.

Preceded by New office	Party Secretary of Gansu; 1949–1954	Succeeded by Zhang Zhongliang
Preceded by Pan Zili	Party Secretary of Shaanxi; 1954–1965	Succeeded by Hu Yaobang
Preceded by Pan Zili	CPPCC Chairman of Shaanxi	Succeeded by Fang Zhongru
