= Bai Jinian =

Chinese politician (1926–2015)

- 白纪年

Party Secretary of Shaanxi
- In office August 1984 – September 1987
- Preceded by: Ma Wenrui
- Succeeded by: Zhang Boxing

Personal details
- Born: February 19, 1926 Suide County, Shaanxi, China
- Died: January 15, 2015 (aged 88) Xi'an, Shaanxi, China
- Party: Chinese Communist Party

Bai Jinian (Chinese: 白纪年; February 19, 1926 – January 15, 2015) was a Chinese politician. He was best known as the first provincial party chief in China elected by an internal democratic process, when he became Party Secretary of Shaanxi in 1984. Considered an associate of Hu Yaobang, Bai fell out of favour in 1987 and was removed from his position.

== Early life ==
Bai was born in Suide County, Shaanxi Province on February 19, 1926, the second son of schoolteacher and small businessman Bai Xingping (白星屏). In 1939, during the Second Sino-Japanese War, he joined Communist fighters in Yan'an, beginning his career as a revolutionary. He taught elementary school in rural Shaanxi and worked as a secretary to local party leaders. He joined the Chinese Communist Party in April 1942.

== Early People's Republic and Cultural Revolution ==
After the foundation of the People's Republic of China in 1949, Bai began a career as a functionary in the Communist Youth League of China (CYL), working under the provincial CYL leader at the time, Hu Yaobang. Thereafter he led rural work in a provincial commission, and was also named deputy party chief of Hanzhong prefecture.

During the Cultural Revolution, Bai was purged for his association with Hu Yaobang and was also labelled an associate of purged party veterans Peng Dehuai and Xi Zhongxun. Bai was placed in solitary confinement, and spent time working as a janitor. He also developed colon cancer. He resumed normal work in 1972, continuing to lead work in rural affairs.

== Reform era ==
After the end of the Cultural Revolution, Bai visited the United States in the summer of 1978, as a member of the Chinese delegation. In February 1979, Bai was named vice-governor of Shaanxi, then in 1983, a member of the provincial Party Standing Committee.

In August 1984, the Communist Party leadership conducted an unprecedented experiment in Shaanxi as part of wider economic and political reforms taking place around the country. An expanded session of the provincial party committee was held, during which more than 300 people, mainly officials at the county level or above, were allowed to elect the party chief of Shaanxi by secret ballot. Bai emerged the winner out of a total of 13 candidates, becoming the first provincial party chief to be elected through this experimental democratic process. As a result, he was featured in a People's Daily story on November 18, 1984, as part of the party's "bold experimentation with cadre reforms", and also received coverage in international media. In September 1985, he became a member of the 12th Central Committee of the Chinese Communist Party. The democratic experiment was short-lived, however. As Bai's patron Hu Yaobang was forced to resign in January 1987, Bai became collateral damage, and was himself forced out of office in September. The party never gave any justification for Bai's ousting. During his three-year tenure in Shaanxi, he was mostly known for spearheading Hu's economic reform activities.

From 1988 to 1998, Bai served as a member of the Standing Committee of the 7th and 8th Chinese People's Political Consultative Conference (CPPCC). He retired in March 1998.

Bai died on January 15, 2015, in Xi'an, at the age of 88.

Party political offices
| Preceded by Ma Wenrui | Party Secretary of Shaanxi; 1984–1987 | Succeeded by Zhang Boxing |
