= Shaanxi Television =

Chinese television network

SXTV logo

Shaanxi Television (Chinese: 陕西卫视), also known as SXTV, is a Chinese television network based in Xi'an, Shaanxi Province, China. It started broacdasting on July 1, 1960. It is majority-owned by the propaganda department of the Shaanxi Provincial Committee of the Chinese Communist Party.

In December 2024, the propaganda department of the Shaanxi Provincial Committee of the Chinese Communist Party and Shaanxi Television and Radio Group formed an international communication center.
