= Hou Zongbin =

Chinese politician

- 侯宗宾

Party Secretary of Henan
- In office March 1990 – December 1992
- Preceded by: Yang Xizong
- Succeeded by: Li Changchun

Governor of Shaanxi
- In office September 1987 – March 1990
- Preceded by: Zhang Boxing
- Succeeded by: Bai Qingcai

Personal details
- Born: January 1929 Nanhe County, Hebei, China
- Died: 14 November 2017 (aged 88) Beijing, China
- Party: Chinese Communist Party

Hou Zongbin (Chinese: 侯宗宾; January 1929 – 14 November 2017) was a Chinese politician. He served as Governor of Shaanxi from 1987 to 1990, as Party Secretary of Henan Province from 1990 to 1992, and as Deputy Secretary of the Central Commission for Discipline Inspection from 1992 to 1998.

== Biography ==
Hou Zongbin was born in Nanhe County, Hebei Province in January 1929. He joined the Chinese Communist Revolution in October 1945 and became a member of the Chinese Communist Party in June 1946. In 1949 he went south with the victorious People's Liberation Army, and served as a low-level official in the new Communist government in Cili County, Hunan Province, later promoted to deputy party secretary of Cili County.

After 1953 he worked in Xiangtan, Hunan, and was later transferred to Gansu Province and became head of the Lanzhou Electric Machinery Factory. In 1983, he was appointed Deputy Governor of Gansu Province, and three years later he became Deputy Party Secretary of Gansu.

In 1987, Hou was appointed Deputy Party Secretary and Acting Governor of the neighbouring Shaanxi Province, and became Governor in January 1988. On 22 April 1989, on the day of reformist leader Hu Yaobang's funeral, 40,000 students and citizens gathered in New City Square of Xi'an, the capital of Shaanxi. Hou arrived on the scene in the afternoon trying to control the situation, but a riot broke out in the evening when three or four hundred people burned down several buildings and cars. Hou was targeted by rumours, possibly started by native Shaanxi politicians resentful of his status as political outsider from out of province, that Hou was responsible for the riot.

In March 1990, Hou became the Party Secretary of Henan Province. During the 14th National Congress of the Chinese Communist Party in October 1992, he was elected Deputy Secretary of the Central Commission for Discipline Inspection, the anti-corruption organ of the CPC. In March 1998, he became Chair of the Internal Affairs and Judicial Committee of the 9th National People's Congress.

Hou was a member of the 13th (1982–1987) and 14th (1987–1992) Central Committees of the Chinese Communist Party.

== Retirement and death ==
After Hou retired in December 2003, he spent his time practicing Chinese calligraphy, and held several personal exhibitions of his works.

In August 2017, Hou made a public statement in support of Chinese Communist Party general secretary Xi Jinping's anti-corruption campaign. He died on 14 November 2017 in Beijing, aged 88. He was buried at the Babaoshan Revolutionary Cemetery.
