= Chen Ruiding =

Chinese politician (b. 1939)

Chen Ruiding (born July 1939, Chinese: 陈瑞鼎), originally from Suzhou, Anhui Province, is a Chinese politician.

== Biography ==
Chen Ruiding joined the Chinese Communist Party (CCP) in June 1964, graduated from the History Department of Anhui University in August 1964, became deputy manager of Anhui Seed Company in April 1979, and served as director and CCP Committee Secretary of the Anhui Provincial Department of Justice (Chinese: 安徽省司法厅) in August 1983. He attended the training course at the Central Party School in September 1984 and July 1986, and was appointed a member of the Anhui Provincial Committee of the CCP in December 1984. In January 1992, he was appointed deputy secretary of the party committee, as well as secretary and director of the Anhui Provincial Public Security Department. In May 1996, he assumed the roles of first secretary of the Standing Committee of the Anhui Provincial Committee of the CCP, head of the Political and Legal Committee, and director and secretary of the party committee of the Provincial Public Security Department. In January 2000, Chen Ruiding was elected as the deputy director of the Standing Committee of the Anhui Provincial People's Congress by the third session of the Ninth National People's Congress of Anhui. From June 1997 to January 2006, he served as the fourth chairman of the Law Society of Anhui Province.
