= Zhang Boxing =

Chinese politician (1930–2025)

Zhang Boxing (Chinese: 张勃兴; August 1930 – 24 June 2025) was a Chinese politician who was born in Bazhou City, Hebei. He received his university education in Xi'an. He was governor (1986–1987), Chinese Communist Party Committee Secretary (1987–1994) and People's Congress Chairman (1993–1998) of Shaanxi. He was a delegate to the 8th National People's Congress. Zhang died on 24 June 2025, at the age of 94.

Preceded by Li Qingwei	Governor of Shaanxi; 1986–1987	Succeeded by Hou Zongbin
Preceded by Bai Jinian	Party Secretary of Shaanxi; 1987–1994	Succeeded by An Qiyuan
Preceded by Li Xipu	Chairman of the Shaanxi People's Congress; 1993–1998	Succeeded by Li Jianguo
