= Liu Guozhong =

Chinese politician

- 刘国中
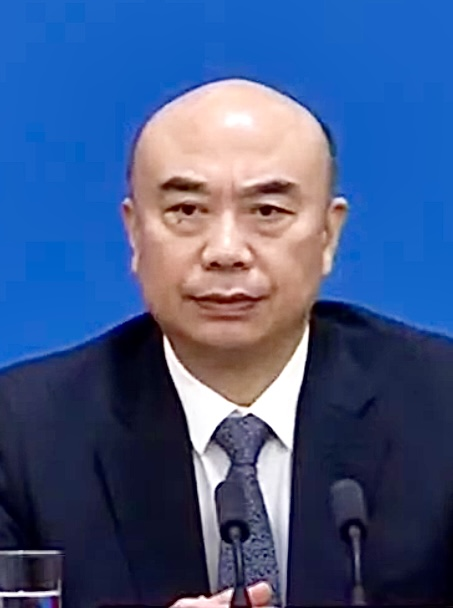
- Liu in 2023

Vice Premier of China
- Incumbent
- Assumed office 12 March 2023 Serving with Ding Xuexiang, He Lifeng, Zhang Guoqing
- Premier: Li Qiang

Party Secretary of Shaanxi
- In office 31 July 2020 – 27 November 2022
- Deputy: Zhao Yide (Governor)
- General Secretary: Xi Jinping
- Preceded by: Hu Heping
- Succeeded by: Zhao Yide

Governor of Shaanxi
- In office 4 January 2018 – 2 August 2020
- Preceded by: Hu Heping
- Succeeded by: Zhao Yide

Governor of Jilin
- In office 12 December 2016 – 2 January 2018
- Preceded by: Jiang Chaoliang
- Succeeded by: Jing Junhai

Personal details
- Born: July 1962 (age 64) Wangkui County, Heilongjiang
- Party: Chinese Communist Party
- Education: Nanjing Institute of Technology; Harbin Institute of Technology
- Cabinet: Li Qiang Government

Chinese name
- Traditional Chinese: 劉國中
- Simplified Chinese: 刘国中
Transcriptions
Standard Mandarin
- Hanyu Pinyin: Liú Guózhōng

Liu Guozhong (Chinese: 刘国中; pinyin: Liú Guózhōng; born July 1962) is a Chinese politician and a member of the Politburo of the Chinese Communist Party who has served as a vice premier of China since March 2023.

He began his career in Heilongjiang province before serving stints at the All-China Federation of Trade Unions and as deputy party secretary of Sichuan. He had served as Governor of Jilin and Shaanxi from 2016 to 2020. He served as the Party Secretary of Shaanxi from 2020 to 2022.

== Early life ==
Liu was born in July 1962 in Wangkui County, Heilongjiang province, China. From 1978 to 1982, he studied fuze design and manufacturing at the artillery department at the East China Institute of Engineering.

After graduation to 1985, Liu worked as a cadre at the Jiancheng Machinery Factory in Harbin, which was part of state-owned arms manufacturer Norinco and also known under the military designation Factory 624. He then pursued a master's degree in metal pressure processing at the Harbin Institute of Technology for three years. He continued his studies at the institute's faculty of management to study systems engineering and left in 1990.

== Heilongjiang (1990–2013) ==
While studying at the Harbin Institute of Technology, in November 1986, Liu joined the Chinese Communist Party. His political career began in 1990 working for the economic committee at the Heilongjiang provincial government as a junior civil servant. He was promoted twice until he was transferred to the government's general office in 1993. He rose through the ranks in the first division of the general office, eventually becoming the director in 1998. Two years later, Liu left the general office for the research office to serve as its deputy director and then its director in 2003.

Between 2003 and 2010, his career overlapped with that of Li Zhanshu, a Xi Jinping loyalist who was deputy party secretary, deputy governor, and governor of Heilongjiang during that period. Li was later promoted to a member of the Politburo Standing Committee of the Chinese Communist Party. In 2004, he was moved out of the provincial government and was appointed the party secretary of Hegang city. He returned to provincial administration in April 2007 to join the standing committee of the Heilongjiang Provincial Committee of the Chinese Communist Party. He became the secretary-general of the party committee in May, and in September 2011, was named executive vice governor of Heilongjiang.

In October 2013, Liu left the Heilongjiang system to become a member of the Secretariat of the All-China Federation of Trade Unions.

== Rising star (2016–2022) ==
In February 2016, he was transferred to Sichuan province become its deputy party secretary. His appointment was the first in a series of promotions that was considered faster than usual. He only stayed in Sichuan for 10 months before moving to Jilin province to become its depty party secretary, vice governor and acting governor in December. The transfer made him, at age 54, the fifth youngest leader of a provincial-level region at the time.

Twelve months later in December 2017, he was moved again, to Shaanxi to be the deputy party secretary. Later he was appointed as the Governor. In July 2020, he was appointed to be the party secretary of Shaanxi succeeding Hu Heping. During his tenure, Xi'an hosted the National Games of China; Liu said the games would help achieve the Chinese Dream. He also oversaw Shaanxi's response to the COVID-19 pandemic. He was succeeded as party secretary of Shaanxi on 27 November 2022, being succeeded by Zhao Yide.

== Politburo member (2022–present) ==
At the CCP's 20th national congress in October 2022, Liu was elevated to the Politburo. Along with Li Ganjie, Ma Xingrui, Yuan Jiajun, and Zhang Guoqing, he was considered to be among a group of young technocrats trained in military-industrial fields who were to be promoted to the top levels of party leadership. Five months later, at the first session of the 14th National People's Congress, he was appointed as the last-ranked of four vice premiers. His portfolio included agriculture and rural affairs, public health, and water management.

Liu toured Beijing and Hebei in August 2023, after floods and mudslides hit Xi'an. In September, Liu visited North Korea to attend the country's 75th national day parade. Liu also met with North Korean leader Kim Jong Un. In January 2024, Liu visited Uganda to attend the Non-Aligned Movement summit and the Third South Summit. In May, addressing the members of the Chinese People's Political Consultative Conference, Liu said China needed to "systematically plan its population policy and increase social support for childbearing to alleviate the financial burdens associated with parenthood and children’s education". In February 2025, he visited Junlian County hospital after landslides in the county. In August, he visited Foshan after chikungunya fever outbreak in the city. In October, he visited the Liangshan Yi Autonomous Prefecture in Sichuan, calling China to step up the prevention and control of major infectious diseases such as HIV/AIDS, as well as measures to combat poverty.

Party political offices
Preceded by Zhang Xingfu	Party Secretary of Hegang; 2004–2007	Succeeded by Zhu Qingwen
Preceded by Yin Li	Deputy Party Secretary of Sichuan; 2016	Succeeded by Deng Xiaogang
Preceded by Hu Heping	Party Secretary of Shaanxi; 2020–2022	Succeeded by Zhao Yide
Government offices
Preceded by Jiang Chaoliang	Governor of Jilin; 2016–2018	Succeeded by Jing Junhai
Preceded by Hu Heping	Governor of Shaanxi; 2018–2020	Succeeded by Zhao Yide
Order of precedence
Preceded by Li Shulei as Member of the Politburo of the Chinese Communist Party	Order of precedence of China as Member of the Politburo of the Chinese Communist Party	Succeeded by Yuan Jiajun as Member of the Politburo of the Chinese Communist Party
