= Li Ruishan =

Chinese politician

Li Ruishan (Chinese: 李瑞山) (November 22, 1920 – October 20, 1997) was a Chinese politician. He was born in Yanchang County, Shaanxi Province. In May 1935, at the age of 14, he joined the Communist Youth League of China and became a member of the Chinese Communist Party in May 1936. He worked at the revolutionary base on the border of Gansu and Ningxia during the Second Sino-Japanese War. He was Chairman of the Revolutionary Committee in his home province (1968-1978). He was a full member of the 9th Central Committee of the Chinese Communist Party, 10th Central Committee of the Chinese Communist Party and 11th Central Committee of the Chinese Communist Party, as well an alternate member of the 12th Central Committee of the Chinese Communist Party.

Preceded by Li Qiming	Chairman of the Revolutionary Committee of Shaanxi; 1968–1978	Succeeded by Wang Renzhong
