= Zhao Gang (born 1968) =

Chinese executive and politician

- 赵刚

Governor of Shaanxi
- Incumbent
- Assumed office 1 December 2022
- Party Secretary: Zhao Yide
- Preceded by: Zhao Yide

Personal details
- Born: June 1968 (age 58) Xinmin County, Liaoning, China
- Party: Chinese Communist Party
- Education: Beijing Institute of Technology
- Website: https://en.shaanxi.gov.cn/government/ww/202212/t20221201_2267034.html

Chinese name
- Simplified Chinese: 赵刚
- Traditional Chinese: 趙剛
Transcriptions
Standard Mandarin
- Hanyu Pinyin: Zhào Gāng

Zhao Gang (Chinese: 赵刚; born June 1968) is a Chinese executive and politician, currently serving as governor of Shaanxi.

He is a representative of the 20th National Congress of the Chinese Communist Party and a member of the 20th Central Committee of the Chinese Communist Party.

== Biography ==
Zhao was born in Xinmin County, Liaoning, in June 1968. In 1986, he entered Beijing Institute of Technology, where he majored in electronic precision machinery. He joined the Chinese Communist Party (CCP) in June 1987.

After graduating in April 1993, Zhao was despatched to Norinco, where he was promoted to vice president in April 2004 and to president in December 2007. He was assistant general manager in September 2010 and subsequently deputy general manager in September 2013.

In September 2017, Zhao was made general manager and deputy party secretary of CFHI Group Corporation Limited, having held the position for only a year.

Zhao was appointed vice governor of Shaanxi in October 2018, concurrently serving as party secretary of Yan'an since January 2021. In January 2021, he was also admitted to member of the Standing Committee of the CCP Shaanxi Provincial Committee, the province's top authority. In May 2022, he was appointed deputy party secretary of Shaanxi after Hu Henghua was selected as mayor of Chongqing. On 1 December 2022, he was appointed to concurrently serve as governor of Shaanxi.

Business positions
Preceded by Wu Shengfu (吴生富)	General Manager of CFHI Group Corporation Limited; 2017–2018	Succeeded by Duan Xiangdong (段向东)
Party political offices
Preceded by Hu Henghua	Specifically-designated Deputy Party Secretary of Shaanxi; 2022-2024	Succeeded by Xing Shanping
Preceded by Xu Xinrong	Party Secretary of Yan'an; 2021–2023	Succeeded by Hao Huijie
Government offices
Preceded by Zhao Yide	Governor of Shaanxi; 2022–	Incumbent
