= Ma Mingfang =

Chinese politician

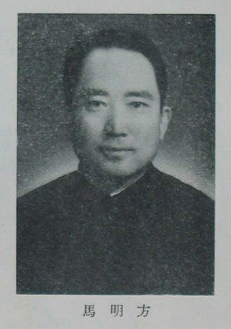
Ma in 1949

Ma Mingfang (Chinese: 马明方) (December 14, 1905 – August 12, 1974), né Ruzhou (汝舟), art name Jimin (济民), was a Chinese politician and early leader of CCP in Shaanxi. Born in Yejiacha (叶家岔) village, Mizhi county, Shaanxi, Ma joined the Party in 1925 when he studied in No.4 normal school of Shaanxi. He was the first Chinese Communist Party Committee Secretary of his home province of Shaanxi (October 1949 – August 1954) and governor of Shaanxi (January 1950 – August 1954). He was an alternate member of the 7th Central Committee of the Chinese Communist Party and a full member of the 8th Central Committee of the Chinese Communist Party. He died in Beijing during the Cultural Revolution.

| Preceded by new office | Party Secretary of Shaanxi; October 1949 – August 1954 | Succeeded by Pan Zili |
| Preceded by new office | Governor of Shaanxi; January 1950 – August 1954 | Succeeded by Zhao Shoushan |
