= An Qiyuan =

Chinese politician (1933–2024)

- 安启元

Chairman of the Shaanxi Provincial Committee of the Chinese People's Political Consultative Conference
- In office January 1998 – January 2003
- Preceded by: Zhou Yaguang
- Succeeded by: Ai Pishan

Party Secretary of Shaanxi
- In office December 1994 – August 1997
- Preceded by: Zhang Boxing
- Succeeded by: Li Jianguo

Secretary of the Political and Legal Affairs Commission of the Shaanxi Provincial Committee of the Chinese Communist Party
- In office September 1990 – April 1993
- Preceded by: Huo Shiren
- Succeeded by: Yang Lie

Party Secretary of Xi'an
- In office June 1988 – September 1990
- Preceded by: Dong Jichang
- Succeeded by: Cheng Andong

Director of the China Earthquake Administration
- In office 1980–1988
- Preceded by: Zou Yu
- Succeeded by: Fang Zhangshun

Personal details
- Born: July 1933 Lintong County, Shaanxi, China
- Died: 23 April 2024 (aged 90) Xi'an, Shaanxi, China
- Party: Chinese Communist Party
- Education: Northwestern University

Chinese name
- Simplified Chinese: 安启元
- Traditional Chinese: 安啟元
Transcriptions
Standard Mandarin
- Hanyu Pinyin: Ān Qǐyuán

An Qiyuan (Chinese: 安启元; pinyin: Ān Qǐyuán; July 1933 – 23 April 2024) was a Chinese politician who served as the Party Secretary of Shaanxi from December 1994 to August 1997.

== Biography ==
An Qiyuan, of Han ethnicity, was born in 1933 in Lintong, Shaanxi province. He joined the CPC in 1953, and graduated from the Geology Department of Northwest University in 1956. He spent the formative years of his career in the mining industry. He headed the Petroleum Exploration Bureau of Heilongjiang Province, Songliao, and successively served as the Director of the Daqing Oil Mine, the chief of the 1st Oil Extracting Headquarters, Underground Operation Section in Daqing, the director of the Petroleum Geophysical Prospecting Bureau in the Ministry of Petroleum Industry, the Deputy Director of the China Seismological Bureau, and the Director of the China Seismological Bureau.

1988 marked his first foray into politics, when he was appointed a member to the Provincial Party Standing Committee for Shaanxi Province. He was the party chief of the provincial capital Xi'an, the Secretary of the Political and Legal Affairs Committee of Shaanxi Province.

In 1993, An attended the 14th CPC National Congress in Beijing as a delegate. In December 1994, he became the provincial Party Secretary, or party chief, of Shaanxi. He held this position until August 1997. After this, he was a delegate to the 15th CPC National Congress in Beijing. In 1998, An became Chairman of the Shaanxi Provincial Committee of the Chinese People's Political Consultative Conference. While this position was considered a largely ceremonial role, An used his experience and clout to influence high-level politicians to put forth a comprehensive plan to prevent flooding on the Wei River. He also advocated for a series of other causes, including mentally challenged children, rural incomes, national oil strategy, and urban poverty. He left public life in 2008.

An was a member of the Standing Committee of the 14th Central Commission for Discipline Inspection.

An died on 23 April 2024, at the age of 90.

Government offices
Preceded by Zou Yu	Director of the China Earthquake Administration; 1980–1988	Succeeded by Fang Zhangshun
Party political offices
Preceded by Dong Jichang	Party Secretary of Xi'an; 1988–1990	Succeeded by Cheng Andong
Preceded by Huo Shiren	Secretary of the Political and Legal Affairs Commission of the Shaanxi Provincial Committee of the Chinese Communist Party; 1990–1993	Succeeded by Yang Lie
Preceded by Zhang Boxing	Party Secretary of Shaanxi; 1994–1997	Succeeded by Li Jianguo
Assembly seats
Preceded by Zhou Yaguang	Chairman of the Shaanxi Provincial Committee of the Chinese People's Political Consultative Conference; 1998–2003	Succeeded by Ai Pishan
