= Nubs Kleinke =

American baseball player (1911–1950)

Nub Kleinke
- Pitcher
- Born: May 19, 1911; Fond du Lac, Wisconsin, U.S.
- Died: March 16, 1950 (aged 38); Pacific Ocean, off Marin County, California, U.S.
- Batted: Right Threw: Right

MLB debut
- April 25, 1935, for the St. Louis Cardinals

Last MLB appearance
- October 3, 1937, for the St. Louis Cardinals

MLB statistics
- Win–loss record: 1–1
- Earned run average: 4.86
- Strikeouts: 14
- Stats at Baseball Reference

Teams
- St. Louis Cardinals (1935, 1937)

Norbert George "Nub" Kleinke (May 19, 1911 – March 16, 1950) was an American professional baseball pitcher who appeared in nine games in Major League Baseball for the St. Louis Cardinals during the seasons of 1935 and 1937. A native of Fond du Lac, Wisconsin, he threw and batted right-handed, stood 6 feet 1 inch (1.85 m) tall and weighed 170 pounds (77 kg).

Kleinke had a 14-season (1931–44) pro career, spending 11 years at the top level of minor league baseball. In his two stints with the Cardinals, Kleinke made four starts and threw one complete game, a 9–3 victory over the Brooklyn Dodgers at Sportsman's Park on September 21, 1937. It was his only MLB triumph. In his nine games, Kleinke posted a 1–1 career won–lost record and a 4.86 earned run average. In 331/3 innings pitched, he permitted 44 hits and ten bases on balls; he struck out 14. In the minor leagues, he won over 155 games.

Kleinke died on March 16, 1950, after suffering a heart attack while fishing off the coast of Marin County, California.
