= Chen Deming =

Chinese politician

- 陈德铭
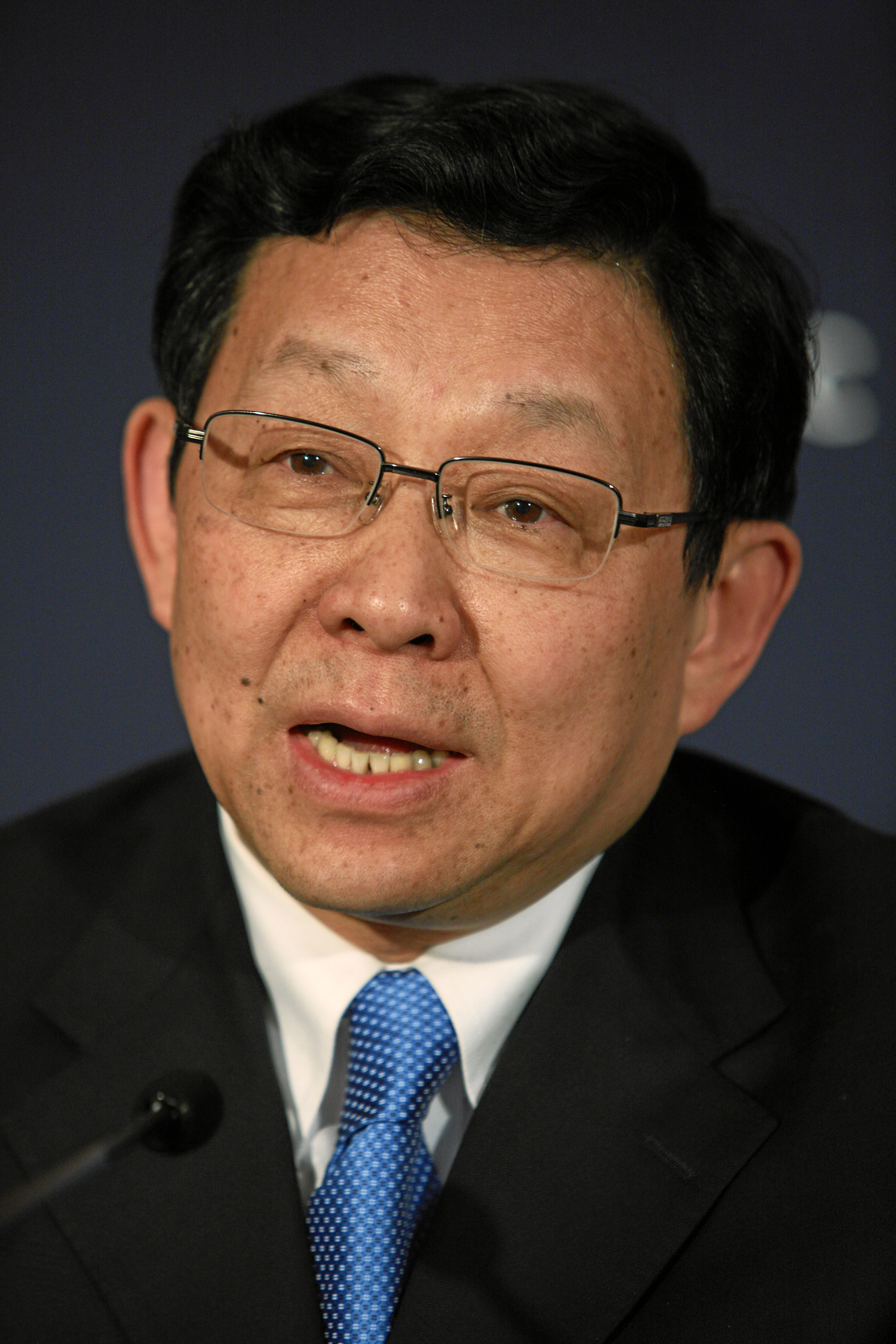
- Deming during the WEF 2011

President of the Association for Relations Across the Taiwan Straits
- In office 26 April 2013 – 27 April 2018
- Preceded by: Chen Yunlin
- Succeeded by: Zhang Zhijun

Minister of Commerce
- In office 29 December 2007 – 16 March 2013
- Preceded by: Bo Xilai
- Succeeded by: Gao Hucheng

Governor of Shaanxi
- In office October 2004 – June 2006
- Preceded by: Jia Zhibang
- Succeeded by: Yuan Chunqing

Personal details
- Born: March 1949 (age 77) Shanghai, Republic of China
- Party: Chinese Communist Party
- Education: Nanjing University

Chen Deming (Chinese: 陈德铭; pinyin: Chén Démíng; born 1949) is a Chinese former politician and President of Association for Relations Across the Taiwan Straits of the People's Republic of China.

== Early life ==
Chen was born in Shanghai in 1949. He went on to receive a bachelor's degree in economics, a master's degree from the Hopkins-Nanjing Center, and later a doctorate in administration from Nanjing University Business School. In 1969, he joined the workforce and in September 1974, Chen joined the Chinese Communist Party.

== Political life ==
Chen was Mayor and later Chinese Communist Party Committee Secretary of Suzhou. He then was the Governor of Shaanxi from 2004 to 2006. Then he was a deputy at the National Development and Reform Commission, where he largely dealt with matters pertaining to China's energy policy.

He was the Minister of Commerce from 2007 to 2013. He was appointed to the post at the Standing Committee of the National People's Congress on 29 December 2007.

== ARATS Presidency ==
=== 2013 Taiwan visit ===
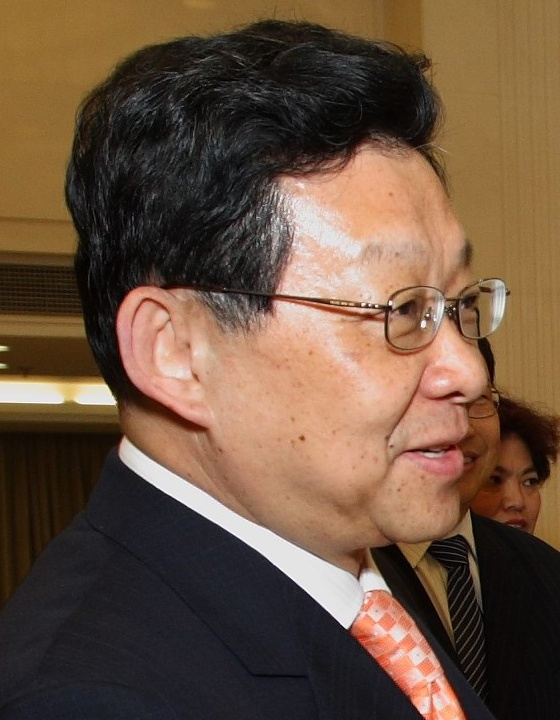
Chen Deming

In end of November 2013, Chen led a delegation for an 8-day visit to Taiwan, his first trip to Taiwan after being appointed as the head of ARATS. He will visit Pingtung County, Kaohsiung City, Tainan City, Chiayi County, Taichung City, Hsinchu County, Taipei City and New Taipei City.

Upon arrival at Taoyuan International Airport, Chen was greeted by Straits Exchange Foundation (SEF) Vice Chairman Kao Koong-lian. He then proceeded for a luncheon hosted by Taoyuan County Magistrate John Wu. Chen and the delegation continued to visit a free-trade harbor zone at Taoyuan Aerotropolis and then met with SEF Chairman Lin Join-sane at SEF Headquarter at Zhongshan District, Taipei.

In Kaohsiung City, Chen and delegation toured the Port of Kaohsiung on a boat which was flying the flag of the Republic of China on the back side.

=== 2014 Taiwan visit ===
In end of February 2014, Chen and delegation visited Taiwan for the 10th round of cross-strait negotiation with the SEF. Both sides signed agreements on meteorological and seismic data sharing. During the visit, he also met with Wang Yu-chi, the head of Mainland Affairs Council. At the final day of the 3-day visit, Chen, accompanied by SEF Chairman Lin Join-sane and Taipei Mayor Hau Lung-bin, visited the Taipei Zoo to see the zoo's giant panda Yuan Zai, whose parents were sent to Taiwan as part of a cultural exchange.

Political offices
Preceded by Jia Zhibang	Governor of Shaanxi; 2004–2006	Succeeded by Yuan Chunqing
Government offices
Preceded by Bo Xilai	Minister of Commerce; 2007–2013	Succeeded by Gao Hucheng
