= Zhao Boping =

Chinese politician

- 赵伯平

Governor of Shaanxi

Communist Party Secretary of Xi'an
- In office December 1949 – 1956

Personal details
- Born: July 1, 1902 Lantian County, Xi'an, Shaanxi, Qing
- Died: May 7, 1993 (aged 90) Beijing, China
- Party: Chinese Communist Party (from February 1927)
- Occupation: Politician, writer

Zhao Boping (Chinese: 赵伯平) (July 1, 1902 – May 7, 1993) was a Chinese politician. He was born in Lantian County, Xi'an, Shaanxi Province. He joined the Chinese Communist Party in February 1927. He was governor of his home province. He was Communist Party Secretary of Xi'an from December 1949 to 1956.

== Biography ==
From July 1930 to December 1932, he served as Secretary of the Special Committee of Northern Shaanxi, together with Liu Zhidan, Xie Zichang and others, led the early revolutionary activities in Northern Shaanxi. After 1933, he served as deputy secretary and secretary of the county party committee of the Central Plains of the Central Committee of the Chinese Communist Party. During the Second Sino-Japanese War, from July 1937 to May 1939, he served as the Standing Committee of the Shaanxi Provincial Committee of the Chinese Communist Party, the Minister of the Provincial Committee of the Democratic Movement Department and the Secretary of the Youth Work Committee, and the Director of the Provincial Party Member Cadre Training Class. From May 1939 to April 1941, he served as the Standing Committee of the Shaanxi Provincial Committee of the Chinese Communist Party, Minister of Propaganda and Youth of the Provincial Party Committee. From April 1941 to the spring of 1942, he served as the Standing Committee of the CCP Shaanxi Provincial Committee, Minister of Propaganda Department, and Minister of Organization Department. In the spring of 1942, he became vice president of the Northwest Bureau of the CCP Central Committee. From the autumn of 1942 to 1943, he studied at the Party School of the CCP Central Committee of Yan'an. Since 1944, he has served as Secretary-General of the Anti-Unification Federation of the Shan-Gan-Ning Border Region and Chairman of the Border Region Cultural Association. In April 1945, attended the Seventh National Congress of the Chinese Communist Party. In 1946, he served as secretary of the Shaanxi Provincial Working Committee of the Chinese Communist Party, and deputy secretary and secretary of the Guanzhong Prefectural Committee of the Shaanxi-Gansu Ning Border Region and political member of the Guanzhong Military Division. Since 1949, he has served as deputy secretary-general of the Northwest Bureau of the Central Committee of the Chinese Communist Party and deputy minister of the Urban Engineering Department, secretary of the Xi'an Municipal Committee of the Chinese Communist Party and political member of the Xi'an Security District. It is one of the main leaders of the CCP taking over Xi'an municipal authority. In March 1963, Zhao Boping was transferred to the Deputy Secretary-General of the Standing Committee of the National People's Congress and deputy director of the General Office; at the Second Session of the Third National People's Congress held in February 1965, he was elected as the deputy director of the Bills Committee. After the start of the "Cultural Revolution", Zhao Boping was persecuted; he did not resume work until 1979 and became a member of the Legal Committee of the Fifth National People's Congress. In September 1980, he was elected as a standing member of the 5th CPPCC National Committee. In June 1983, he was elected as a standing member of the 6th CPPCC National Committee.

== Post-retirement later life ==
After his resignation, Zhao Boping lived in the residential building of Beijing Muxidi Minister. At the same time, he began to write revolutionary memoirs, write modern Qinqiang scripts, and participate in the work of traditional dramas such as rescue strings; representative plays include "New Exam", "Da Shang Dang", "Catch the Traitor", "Qi Banxian", "Special School", etc. On May 7, 1993, he died of illness in Beijing at the age of 91.

Preceded by Jia Tuofu	Party Secretary of Xi'an; December 1949 - March 1956	Succeeded by Fang Zhongru
Preceded by Zhao Shoushan	Governor of Shaanxi; 1959-1963	Succeeded by Li Qiming
