= Li Jianguo =

Chinese politician (born 1946)

- 李建国
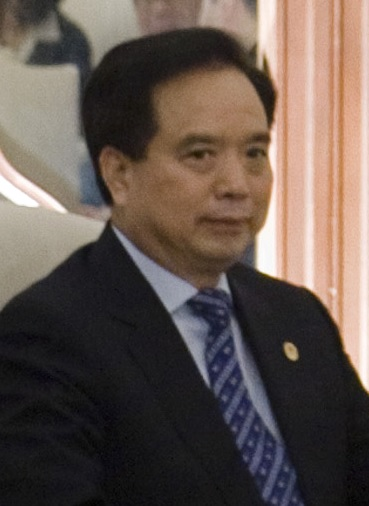
- Li in 2010

Vice Chairman of the Standing Committee of the National People's Congress
- In office 15 March 2008 – 14 March 2018
- Chairman: Wu Bangguo; Zhang Dejiang

Secretary-General of the Standing Committee of the National People's Congress
- In office 15 March 2008 – 14 March 2013
- Preceded by: Sheng Huaren
- Succeeded by: Wang Chen

Chairman of the All-China Federation of Trade Unions
- In office 1 March 2013 – 22 March 2018
- Preceded by: Wang Zhaoguo
- Succeeded by: Wang Dongming

Party Secretary of Shandong
- In office 26 March 2007 – 31 March 2008
- Preceded by: Zhang Gaoli
- Succeeded by: Jiang Yikang

Party Secretary of Shaanxi
- In office 26 August 1997 – 25 March 2007
- Preceded by: An Qiyuan
- Succeeded by: Zhao Leji

Personal details
- Born: April 1946 (age 80) Juancheng County, Shandong, China
- Party: Chinese Communist Party
- Education: Shandong University

Li Jianguo (Chinese: 李建国; pinyin: Lǐ Jiànguó; born April 1946) is a retired Chinese politician who served as a member of the 18th Politburo of the Chinese Communist Party, Vice-Chairman of the National People's Congress, and Chairman of the All-China Federation of Trade Unions. He was formerly Communist Party Chief of Shaanxi and Shandong provinces; he also served as the Secretary-General of the National People's Congress.

== Biography ==
=== Tianjin ===
Born in Juancheng County, Shandong Province, Li graduated from department of Chinese literature of Shandong University, and joined the Chinese Communist Party in June 1971. In his early years, he served in various posts in Tianjin, and used to be the secretary of Li Ruihuan, the then Party chief of Tianjin. In the 1980s, when Li Ruihuan governed Tianjin, Li Jianguo was continuously elevated, and he served as vice director and director of general office of CPC Tianjin committee, vice secretary general of the committee, a standing committee member and secretary general of the committee, the secretary of CPC committee in Heping district of Tianjin, and eventually the vice Party chief of Tianjin.

=== Shaanxi ===
In August 1997, Li was promoted to the secretary of CPC Shaanxi committee at the age of 51, and was elected the chairman of Shaanxi People's Congress in January 1998. He served in Shaanxi for 10 years until March 2007, when he was transferred to Shandong and became the Party chief of Shandong Province. Later, he was also elected the chairman of Shandong People's Congress.

=== National People's Congress ===
In March 2008, Li was elected vice chairman of National People's Congress and also became the secretary general of the Congress, thus becoming a national leader. He was re-elected vice chairman of the NPC in 2012, ranking first among the vice-chairmen.

Li was an alternate member of 14th Central Committee of the Chinese Communist Party, and a full member of the 15th to the 18th central committees.

Party political offices
Preceded by An Qiyuan	Party Secretary of Shaanxi; 1997–2007	Succeeded by Zhao Leji
Preceded by Zhang Gaoli	Party Secretary of Shandong; 2007–2008	Succeeded by Jiang Yikang
Political offices
Preceded by Wang Zhaoguo	Chairman of the All-China Federation of Trade Unions; 2013–2018	Succeeded by Wang Dongming
