= Wang Renzhong =

Chinese politician (1917–1992)

- 王任重
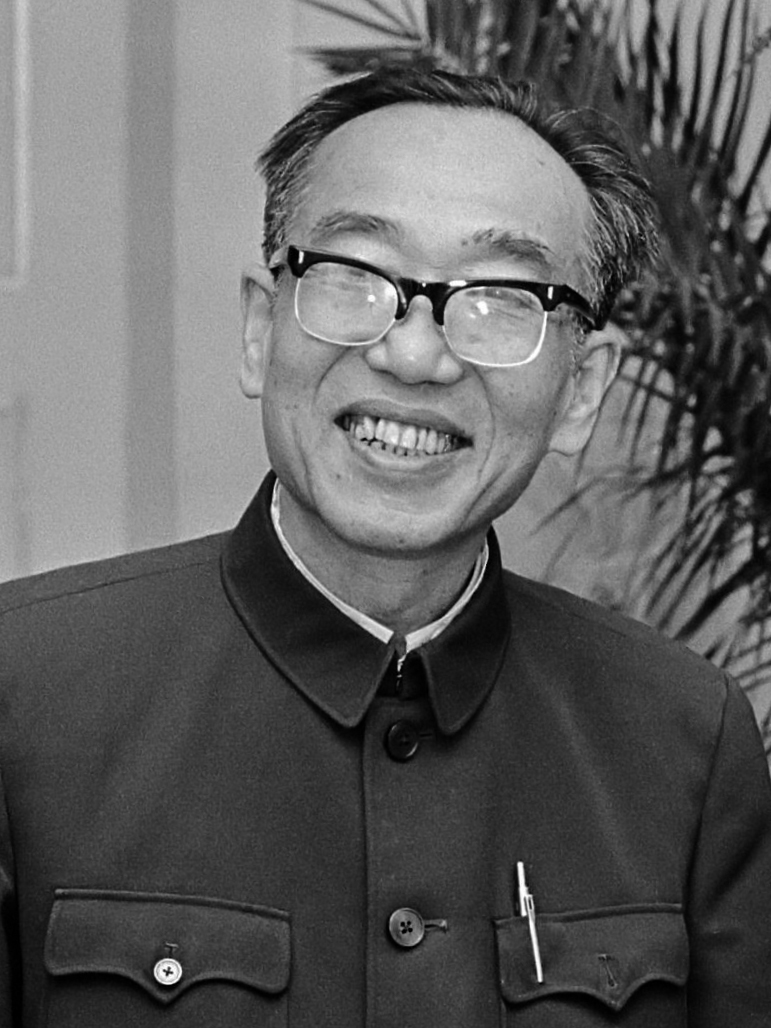
- Wang Renzhong in 1979
- Born: January 15, 1917; Jing County, Hebei
- Died: March 16, 1992 (aged 75)

Wang Renzhong (Chinese: 王任重; January 15, 1917 – March 16, 1992) was a Chinese political leader. He was born to a peasant family in Jing County, Hebei. In November 1933, he joined the Chinese Communist Party (CCP). From 1938, he served as the vice director of Hebei-Shandong-Henan CCP Publicity Department, director of South Hebei CPC Publicity Department, and as a party group secretary. After 1945, he became the director of South Hebei CCP Administrative Office.

After 1949, he arrived in Wuhan with the army and was appointed a standing member of the Hubei Provincial Party Committee and vice president of the People's Government of Hubei Province. In 1954 he became First Secretary (Party Chief) of the Hubei Communist Party Committee, the top leader of the province. He was very active in the Great Leap Forward period, but was purged during the Cultural Revolution, and imprisoned for eight years until 1975. In 1978 he became the vice-premier of the State Council, and from 1980 to 1982 he served as the head of Publicity Department.
