= Politics of Xi'an =

The Politics of Xi'an in Shaanxi province in the People's Republic of China is structured in a dual party-government system like all other governing institutions in mainland China.

The Mayor of Xi'an is the highest-ranking official in the People's Government of Xi'an or Xi'an Municipal Government. However, in the city's dual party-government governing system, the Mayor has less power than the Communist Party of Xi'an Municipal Committee Secretary, colloquially termed the "CPC Party Chief of Xi'an" or "Communist Party Secretary of Xi'an".

== History ==
In November 2015, Sun Qingyun was put under investigation for alleged "serious violations of discipline", he was placed on two-year probation within the Party, having held the consultative position for only nine months; he was demoted to section rank "non-leading position" (正处级).

On May 22, 2017, Wei Minzhou was suspected of "serious violations of discipline", and placed under investigation by the Central Commission for Discipline Inspection (CCDI).

On October 29, 2018, Shangguan Jiqing was placed on probation within the Communist Party. The Communist government suspended him, and then downgraded him. He has been demoted to less responsible job. The government confiscated his illegal gains.

== List of mayors of Xi'an ==
No.	English name	Chinese name	Took office	Left office	Notes
1	Jia Tuofu	贾拓夫	May 1949	April 1950	
2	Fang Zhongru	方仲如	April 1950	December 1956	
3	Liu Geng	刘庚	December 1956	November 1960	
4	Shi Yizhi	时逸之	November 1960	June 1963	
5	Liu Geng	刘庚	June 1963	May 1965	
6	Xu Bu	徐步	May 1965	May 1968	
7	Sun Changxing	孙长兴	May 1968	December 1975	
8	Wang Lin	王林	December 1975	February 1979	
9	Chen Yuanfang	陈元方	February 1979	January 1980	
10	Wang Zhen	王真	January 1980	November 1981	
11	Zhang Tiemin	张铁民	November 1981	November 1984	
12	Yuan Zhengzhong	袁正中	November 1984	August 1990	
13	Cui Lintao	崔林涛	August 1990	January 1995	
14	Feng Xuchu	冯煦初	January 1995	January 2002	
15	Sun Qingyun	孙清云	January 2002	April 2002	Acting
16	Sun Qingyun	孙清云	April 2002	July 2006	
17	Chen Baogen	陈宝根	July 2006	February 2007	Acting
18	Chen Baogen	陈宝根	February 2007	January 2012	
19	Dong Jun	董军	January 2012	February 2012	
20	Dong Jun	董军	February 2012	January 2016	
21	Shangguan Jiqing	上官吉庆	February 2016	5 November 2018	
22	Li Mingyuan	李明远	1 February 2019	4 April 2023	
23	Ye Niuping	叶牛平	4 April 2023	Incumbent	

== List of CPC Party secretaries of Xi'an ==
No.	English name	Chinese name	Took office	Left office	Notes
1	Jia Tuofu	贾拓夫	May 1949	December 1949	
2	Zhao Boping	赵伯平	December 1949	March 1954	
3	Zhao Boping	赵伯平	March 1954	March 1956	
4	Fang Zhongru	方仲如	May 1956	June 1958	
5	Zhang Ce	张策	June 1958	December 1962	
6	Peng Tianqi	彭天琦	March 1963	May 1965	
7	Xiao Chun	肖纯	May 1965	January 1967	
8	Sun Changxing	孙长兴	March 1968	May 1971	
9	Sun Changxing	孙长兴	May 1971	December 1975	
10	Wang Lin	王林	December 1975	February 1979	
11	Chen Yuanfang	陈元方	February 1979	June 1982	
12	He Chenghua	何承华	June 1982	August 1983	
13	He Chenghua	何承华	August 1983	November 1984	
14	Dong Jichang	董继昌	November 1984	May 1988	
15	An Qiyuan	安启元	June 1988	October 1990	
16	Chen Andong	陈安东	October 1990	January 1995	
17	Cui Lintao	崔林涛	January 1995	January 2002	
18	Li Zhanshu	栗战书	January 2002	December 2003	
19	Yuan Chunqing	袁纯清	January 2004	July 2006	
20	Sun Qingyun	孙清云	July 2006	June 2012	
21	Wei Minzhou	魏民洲	June 2012	December 2016	
22	Wang Yongkang	王永康	December 2016	February 2019	
23	Wang Hao	王浩	September 2019	29 September 2021	
24	Fang Hongwei	方红卫	7 November 2021	7 November 2026	
25	Hao Huijie	蒿慧杰	16 January 2026	Incumbent	
