= List of voting results of the National People's Congress =

This list records voting results from delegates of the National People's Congress of China since 2006, when the official state media started to use text reporting live through the internet. Any other results before 2006 that are known are also listed.

== Voting rules ==
Source: Rules of Procedure for the National People's Congress of the People's Republic of China

=== Approval rates needed ===
Current delegates: 2900 (as of 4 November 2017)

Event	Percentage required	Votes needed	Voting methods
Constitutional Amendments	>66.67%	1934	Secret ballot
Elections and appointments	>50.00%	1451	Secret ballot
Bills and proposals	>50.00%	1451	Electronic voting device

=== Differences between elections and appointments ===
Elect (选举): Candidates are nominated by the Presidium or by the delegates. When voting to elect, delegates are allowed to vote for or against the candidate, or to abstain. If a delegate votes against the candidate, they can write in another person as a replacement, but if they abstain, this right is unavailable.
Appoint (决定任命): Candidates are nominated by an appointed person, such as president, who has just been elected by the delegates. When voting to appoint, as with elections, delegates are allowed to vote for or against the candidate, or to abstain, but by contrast, they can't write in another person after voting against or abstaining.

== Constitutional Amendment ==
Years	Voters	For	Against	Abstain	Percentage
2004	2,890	2,863	10	17	99.07%
2018	2,963	2,958	2	3	99.83%

== Elections and appointments ==
=== 1993 ===
NPCSC Chairmanship Election
Candidates	Age	Constituency	Main public experience(s)	Voters	For	Against	Abstain	Percentage
Qiao Shi	69	Zhejiang	Member of the CCP Central Politburo Standing Committee	2,918	2,850	44	24	97.67%
Presidential Election
Candidates	Age	Constituency	Main public experience(s)	Voters	For	Against	Abstain	Percentage
Jiang Zemin	67	Shanghai	General Secretary of the CCP Central Committee; Chairman of the CMC	2,918	2,858	35	25	97.94%

=== 1998 ===
NPCSC Chairmanship Election
Candidates	Age	Constituency	Main public experience(s)	Voters	For	Against	Abstain	Percentage
Li Peng	70	Beijing	Member of the Politburo Standing Committee of CCP; Premier	2,942	2,616	200	126	88.92%
Presidential Election
Candidates	Age	Constituency	Main public experience(s)	Voters	For	Against	Abstain	Percentage
Jiang Zemin	72	Tibet	General Secretary of CCP; President; Chairman of CMC	2,947	2,882	36	29	97.79%
Vice Presidential Election
Candidates	Age	Constituency	Main public experience(s)	Voters	For	Against	Abstain	Percentage
Hu Jintao	56	Tibet	Member of the Politburo Standing Committee of CCP; Secretary of the Secretariat of CCP	2,947	2,841	67	39	96.40%

=== 2003 ===
Presidential Election
Candidates	Age	Constituency	Main public experience(s)	Voters	For	Against	Abstain	Percentage
Hu Jintao	61	Tibet	General Secretary of CCP; Vice President; Vice Chairman of CMC	2,944	2,937	4	3	99.76%
Vice Presidential Election
Candidates	Age	Constituency	Main public experience(s)	Voters	For	Against	Abstain	Percentage
Zeng Qinghong	64	Beijing	Member of the Politburo Standing Committee of CCP	2,945	2,578	177	190	87.54%
CMC Chairmanship Election
Candidates	Age	Constituency	Main public experience(s)	Voters	For	Against	Abstain	Percentage
Jiang Zemin	77	Shanghai	President; Chairman of CMC	2,946	2,726	98	122	92.53%
Premier Nomination
Candidates	Age	Constituency	Main public experience(s)	Voters	For	Against	Abstain	Percentage
Wen Jiabao	61	Gansu	Member of the Politburo Standing Committee of CCP; Vice Premier	2,925	2,906	3	16	99.35%

=== 2008 ===
NPCSC Chairmanship Election
Candidates	Age	Constituency	Main public experience(s)	Voters	For	Against	Abstain	Percentage
Wu Bangguo	67	Anhui	Party Secretary of Shandong	2,965	2,932	25	8	98.89%
NPCSC Secretary-General Election
Candidates	Age	Constituency	Main public experience(s)	Voters	For	Against	Abstain	Percentage
Li Jianguo	62	Anhui	Member of the Politburo Standing Committee of CCP; Chairman of NPCSC	2,966	2,948	9	9	99.39%
Presidential Election
Candidates	Age	Constituency	Main public experience(s)	Voters	For	Against	Abstain	Percentage
Hu Jintao	66	Jiangsu	General Secretary of CCP; President; Chairman of CMC	2,964	2,956	3	5	99.73%
Vice Presidential Election
Candidates	Age	Constituency	Main public experience(s)	Voters	For	Against	Abstain	Percentage
Xi Jinping	55	Shanghai	Member of the Politburo Standing Committee of CCP	2,964	2,919	28	17	98.48%
CMC Chairmanship Election
Candidates	Age	Constituency	Main public experience(s)	Voters	For	Against	Abstain	Percentage
Hu Jintao	66	Jiangsu	General Secretary of CCP; President; Chairman of CMC	2,967	2,959	4	4	99.73%
Premier Nomination
Candidates	Age	Constituency	Main public experience(s)	Voters	For	Against	Abstain	Percentage
Wen Jiabao	66	Gansu	Member of the Politburo Standing Committee of CCP; Premier	2,959	2,926	21	12	98.88%
Supreme People's Court Presidential Election
Candidates	Age	Constituency	Main public experience(s)	Voters	For	Against	Abstain	Percentage
Wang Shengjun	62	Gansu	Secretary-General of the Central Political and Legal Affairs Commission of CCP	2,965	2,885	36	44	97.30%
Procurator-general Election
Candidates	Age	Constituency	Main public experience(s)	Voters	For	Against	Abstain	Percentage
Cao Jianming	53	Liaoning	Vice President of the Supreme People's Court	2,966	2,933	16	17	98.89%

=== 2013 ===
NPCSC Chairmanship Election
Candidates	Age	Constituency	Main public experience(s)	Voters	For	Against	Abstain	Percentage
Zhang Dejiang	67	Zhejiang	Member of the Politburo Standing Committee of CCP; Vice Premier	2,961	2,952	5	4	99.69%
NPCSC Vice Chairmanship Election
Candidates	Age	Constituency	Main public experience(s)	Voters	For	Against	Abstain	Percentage
Chen Changzhi	68	Ningxia	Chairman of the China Democratic National Construction Association	2,956	2,952	4	0	99.86%
Arken Imirbaki	60	Xinjiang	Chairman of the Standing Committee of Xinjiang People's Congress	2,956	2,950	5	1	99.80%
Qiangba Puncog	66	Tibet	Chairman of the Standing Committee of Tibet People's Congress	2,956	2,949	5	2	99.76%
Yan Junqi	67	Jiangsu	Chairman of the China Association for Promoting Democracy	2,956	2,948	5	3	99.73%
Li Jianguo	67	Anhui	Vice Chairman of NPCSC	2,956	2,944	9	3	99.59%
Zhang Baowen	67	Heilongjiang	Chairman of the China Democratic League	2,956	2,933	17	6	99.22%
Wan Exiang	57	Hubei	Chairman of the Revolutionary Committee of the Chinese Kuomintang	2,956	2,931	19	6	99.15%
Chen Zhu	60	Shaanxi	Chairman of the China Peasants' & Workers' Democratic Party; Minister of Health	2,956	2,913	32	11	98.55%
Wang Shengjun	67	Gansu	President of the Supreme People's Court	2,956	2,894	45	17	97.90%
Ji Bingxuan	62	Heilongjiang	Party Secretary of Heilongjiang	2,956	2,887	55	14	97.67%
Zhang Ping	67	Hunan	Chairman of the National Development and Reform Commission	2,956	2,879	56	21	97.40%
Wang Chen	63	Shaanxi	Deputy Head of the Central Publicity Department of CCP; Director of the Information Office of the State Council	2,956	2,877	56	23	97.33%
Shen Yueyue	56	Zhejiang	Executive Deputy Head of the Central Organization Department of CCP	2,956	2,808	103	45	94.99%
NPCSC Secretary-General Election
Candidates	Age	Constituency	Main public experience(s)	Voters	For	Against	Abstain	Percentage
Wang Chen	63	Shaanxi	Deputy Head of the Central Publicity Department of CCP; Director of the Information Office of the State Council	2,961	2,923	30	7	98.72%
Zhang Ping	67	Hunan	Chairman of the National Development and Reform Commission	2,961	1	-	-	0.03%
Presidential Election
Candidates	Age	Constituency	Main public experience(s)	Voters	For	Against	Abstain	Percentage
Xi Jinping	60	Shanghai	General Secretary of CCP; President; Vice Chairman of CMC	2,956	2,952	1	3	99.86%
Vice Presidential Election
Candidates	Age	Constituency	Main public experience(s)	Voters	For	Against	Abstain	Percentage
Li Yuanchao	63	Jiangsu	Member of the Politburo of CCP	2,962	2,839	80	37	95.85%
Liu Yunshan	66	Inner Mongolia	Member of the Politburo Standing Committee of CCP; Secretary of the Secretariat of CCP	2,962	2	-	-	0.06%
Li Hongzhong	57	Hubei	Party Secretary of Hubei	2,962	1	-	-	0.03%
Wang Yang	58	Anhui	Member of the Politburo of CCP	2,962	1	-	-	0.03%
Yuan Chunqing	61	Shanxi	Party Secretary of Shanxi	2,962	1	-	-	0.03%
Pan Yiyang	52	Inner Mongolia	Executive Deputy Chairman of Inner Mongolia	2,962	1	-	-	0.03%
CMC Chairmanship Election
Candidates	Age	Constituency	Main public experience(s)	Voters	For	Against	Abstain	Percentage
Xi Jinping	60	Shanghai	General Secretary of CCP; President; Vice Chairman of CMC	2,959	2,955	1	3	99.87%
Premier Nomination
Candidates	Age	Constituency	Main public experience(s)	Voters	For	Against	Abstain	Percentage
Li Keqiang	58	Shandong	Member of the Politburo Standing Committee of CCP; Vice Premier	2,949	2,940	3	6	99.69%
Vice Premierial Nomination
Candidates	Age	Constituency	Main public experience(s)	Voters	For	Against	Abstain	Percentage
Zhang Gaoli	67	Tianjin	Member of the Politburo Standing Committee of CCP	2,952	2,938	12	2	99.53%
Wang Yang	58	Anhui	Member of the Politburo of CCP	2,952	2,928	20	4	99.19%
Ma Kai	67	Shanxi	Member of the Politburo of CCP; State Councilor; Secretary-General of the State Council	2,952	2,895	43	14	98.07%
Liu Yandong	68	Hebei	Member of the Politburo of CCP; State Councilor	2,952	2,887	47	18	97.80%
State Councilors Election
Candidates	Age	Constituency	Main public experience(s)	Voters	For	Against	Abstain	Percentage
Chang Wanquan	64	PLA	Member of CMC; Minister of Defend	2,952	2,934	16	2	99.39%
Guo Shengkun	59	Guangxi	Minister of Public Security	2,952	2,932	19	1	99.32%
Wang Yong	58	Qinghai	Chairman of the State-owned Assets Supervision and Administration Commission of the State Council	2,952	2,897	39	16	98.14%
Yang Jiechi	63	Hainan	Minister of Foreign Affairs	2,952	2,866	75	11	97.09%
Supreme People's Court Presidential Election
Candidates	Age	Constituency	Main public experience(s)	Voters	For	Against	Abstain	Percentage
Zhou Qiang	53	Hunan	Party Secretary of Hunan	2,969	2,885	36	44	97.17%
Wu Aiying	62	Shandong	Minister of Justice	2,969	2	-	-	0.07%
Wang Shengjun	66	Gansu	President of the Supreme People's Court	2,969	1	-	-	0.03%
Qi Qi	61	Zhejiang	President of the Senior People's Court of Zhejiang	2,969	1	-	-	0.03%
Procurator-general Election
Candidates	Age	Constituency	Main public experience(s)	Voters	For	Against	Abstain	Percentage
Cao Jianming	58	Liaoning	Procurator-General of the Supreme People's Procuratorate	2,958	2,933	18	5	99.15%
Chen Yunlong	61	Zhejiang	Procurator-General of the Senior People's Procuratorate of Zhejiang	2,958	1	-	-	0.03%
Cai Xuebin	49	Hubei	Lawyer of the Hubei Dewell & Partners Law Office	2,958	1	-	-	0.03%

Name lists of the NPC Special Committees
Committees	Voters	For	Against	Abstain	Percentage
Ethnic Affairs	2,899	2,833	48	18	97.72%
Law	2,946	2,814	105	27	95.52%
Internal and Judicial Affairs	2,944	2,766	147	31	93.95%
Financial and Economic Affairs	2,964	2,919	22	23	98.48%
Education, Science, Culture and Public Health	2,934	2,574	307	53	87.73%
Foreign Affairs	2,946	2,633	258	55	89.38%
Overseas Chinese Affairs	2,947	2,748	154	45	93.25%
Environment Protection and Resources Conservation	2,944	1,969	850	125	66.88%
Agriculture and Rural Affairs	2,945	2,658	228	59	90.25%

=== 2018 ===
NPCSC Chairmanship Election
Candidates	Age	Constituency	Main public experience(s)	Voters	For	Against	Abstain	Percentage
Li Zhanshu	67	Jiangxi	Director of the General Office of the Chinese Communist Party	2,970	2,970	0	0	100.00%
NPCSC Vice Chairmanship Election
Candidates	Age	Constituency	Main public experience(s)	Voters	For	Against	Abstain	Percentage
Wang Chen	68	Zhejiang	Vice Chairman of the NPCSC	2,970	2,970	0	0	100.00%
Cao Jianming	62	Sichuan	Procurator-general of the Supreme People’s Procuratorate	2,970	2,970	0	0	100.00%
Zhang Chunxian	64	Hubei	Deputy Leader of the Leading Group for Party Building; Communist Party Secretary of the Xinjiang Uyghur Autonomous Region	2,970	2,969	1	0	99.97%
Shen Yueyue	61	Fujian	Vice Chairman of the NPCSC	2,970	2,969	1	0	99.97%
Ji Bingxuan	66	Jiangsu	Vice Chairman of the NPCSC	2,970	2,970	0	0	100.00%
Arken Imirbaki	65	Xinjiang	Vice Chairman of the NPCSC	2,970	2,970	0	0	100.00%
Wan Exiang	62	Henan	Vice Chairman of the NPCSC; Chairman of the Revolutionary Committee of the Chinese Kuomintang	2,970	2,970	0	0	100.00%
Chen Zhu	65	Ningxia	Vice Chairman of the NPCSC; Chairman of the Chinese Peasants' and Workers' Democratic Party; Minister of Health	2,970	2,970	0	0	100.00%
Wang Dongming	61	Sichuan	Communist Party Secretary of Sichuan	2,970	2,970	0	0	100.00%
Padma Choling	66	Tibet	Chairman of the Standing Committee of Tibet People's Congress	2,970	2,969	1	0	99.97%
Ding Zhongli	61	Shanghai	Vice President of the Chinese Academy of Sciences	2,970	2,968	1	1	99.93%
Hao Mingjin	61	Hubei	Chairman of the China National Democratic Construction Association	2,970	2,970	0	0	100.00%
Cai Dafeng	67	Jiangsu	Chairman of the China Association for Promoting Democracy	2,970	2,969	1	0	99.97%
Wu Weihua	61	Henan	Chairperson of the Jiusan Society	2,970	2,970	0	0	100.00%
NPCSC Secretary-General Election
Candidates	Age	Constituency	Main public experience(s)	Voters	For	Against	Abstain	Percentage
Yang Zhenwu	62	Shanxi	President of the People's Daily	2,970	2,970	0	0	100.00%
Presidential Election
Candidates	Age	Constituency	Main public experience(s)	Voters	For	Against	Abstain	Percentage
Xi Jinping	65	Inner Mongolia	General Secretary of CCP; President; Chairman of CMC	2,970	2,970	0	0	100.00%
Vice Presidential Election
Candidates	Age	Constituency	Main public experience(s)	Voters	For	Against	Abstain	Percentage
Wang Qishan	69	Hunan	Secretary of the Central Commission for Discipline Inspection	2,970	2,969	1	0	99.97%
CMC Chairmanship Election
Candidates	Age	Constituency	Main public experience(s)	Voters	For	Against	Abstain	Percentage
Xi Jinping	65	Inner Mongolia	General Secretary of the CCP; President; Chairman of the CMC	2,970	2,970	0	0	100.00%
CMC Vice Chairmanship Election
Candidates	Age	Constituency	Main public experience(s)	Voters	For	Against	Abstain	Percentage
Xu Qiliang	67	PLA and PAP	Vice Chairman of the CMC	2,966	2,962	0	4	99.87%
Zhang Youxia	67	PLA and PAP	Vice Chairman of the CMC; Director of Equipment Development Department	2,966	2,963	2	1	99.90%
Premier Nomination
Candidates	Age	Constituency	Main public experience(s)	Voters	For	Against	Abstain	Percentage
Li Keqiang	62	Guangxi	Premier	2,966	2,964	2	0	99.93%
Vice Premierial Nomination
Candidates	Age	Constituency	Main public experience(s)	Voters	For	Against	Abstain	Percentage
Han Zheng	63	Shaanxi	Member of the Politburo Standing Committee of CCP	2,969	2,965	4	0	99.87%
Sun Chunlan	67	Jilin	Member of the Politburo of CCP	2,969	2,956	5	8	99.56%
Hu Chunhua	54	Hunan	Member of the Politburo of CCP	2,969	2,968	0	1	99.97%
Liu He	66	Shanxi	Member of the Politburo of CCP	2,969	2,964	3	2	99.83%
State Councilors Election
Candidates	Age	Constituency	Main public experience(s)	Voters	For	Against	Abstain	Percentage
Wei Fenghe	64	PLA and PAP	Commander of the PLA Rocket Force	2,969	2,968	0	1	99.97%
Wang Yong	63	Shandong	State Councilor	2,969	2,957	8	4	99.60%
Wang Yi	64	Fujian	Minister of Foreign Affairs	2,969	2,966	2	1	99.90%
Xiao Jie	60	Hainan	Minister of Finance	2,969	2,965	3	1	99.87%
Zhao Kezhi	64	Tibet	Minister of Public Security	2,969	2,967	1	1	99.93%
Supreme People's Court Presidential Election
Candidates	Age	Constituency	Main public experience(s)	Voters	For	Against	Abstain	Percentage
Zhou Qiang	58	Henan	Supreme People's Court President	2,966	2,956	5	5	99.66%
Procurator-general Election
Candidates	Age	Constituency	Main public experience(s)	Voters	For	Against	Abstain	Percentage
Zhang Jun	61	Hebei	Minister of Justice	2,966	2,951	5	10	99.49%
NSC Director Election
Candidates	Age	Constituency	Main public experience(s)	Voters	For	Against	Abstain	Percentage
Yang Xiaodu	64	Gansu	Minister of Supervision	2,972	2,969	1	0	99.90%
Liu Yuan	67	PLA and PAP	Deputy chairperson of the National People's Congress Financial and Economic Affairs Committee	2,972	2	0	0	0.07%

=== 2023 ===
NPCSC Chairmanship Election
Candidates	Age	Constituency	Main public experience(s)	Voters	For	Against	Abstain	Percentage
Zhao Leji	66	Sichuan	Secretary of the Central Commission for Discipline Inspection	2,952	2,952	0	0	100.00%
NPCSC Vice Chairmanship Election
Candidates	Age	Constituency	Main public experience(s)	Voters	For	Against	Abstain	Percentage
Li Hongzhong	66	Gansu	Communist Party Secretary of Tianjin	2,952	2,950	1	1	99.93%
Wang Dongming	66	Shanxi	Chairman of the All-China Federation of Trade Unions	2,952	2,952	0	0	100.00%
Xiao Jie	65	Hubei	State Councilor; Secretary General of the State Council	2,952	2,952	0	0	100.00%
Zheng Jianbang	66	Shandong	Vice Chairman of the CPPCC; Chairman of the Revolutionary Committee of the Chinese Kuomintang	2,952	2,952	0	0	100.00%
Ding Zhongli	66	Jilin	Vice Chairman of the NPCSC Chairman of the China Democratic League	2,952	2,952	0	0	100.00%
Hao Mingjin	66	Zhejiang	Vice Chairman of the NPCSC Chairperson of the China National Democratic Construction Association	2,952	2,952	0	0	100.00%
Cai Dafeng	62	Anhui	Vice Chairman of the NPCSC; Chairman of the China Association for Promoting Democracy	2,952	2,952	0	0	100.00%
He Wei	67	Hunan	Vice Chairman of the CPPCC; Chairman of the Chinese Peasants' and Workers' Democratic Party	2,952	2,952	0	0	100.00%
Wu Weihua	66	Hainan	Vice Chairman of the NPCSC Chairman of the Jiusan Society	2,952	2,952	0	0	100.00%
Tie Ning	65	Hubei	Chairwoman of the China Federation of Literary and Art Circles	2,952	2,952	0	0	100.00%
Peng Qinghua	65	Sichuan	Communist Party Secretary of Sichuan	2,952	2,952	0	0	100.00%
Zhang Qingwei	61	Hunan	Communist Party Secretary of Henan	2,952	2,952	0	0	100.00%
Losang Jamcan	65	Tibet	Chairman of the Tibet Autonomous Region People's Congress	2,952	2,952	0	0	100.00%
Shohrat Zakir	69	Xinjiang	Chairman of the Xinjiang Uygur Autonomous Region	2,952	2,952	0	0	100.00%
NPCSC Secretary-General Election
Candidates	Age	Constituency	Main public experience(s)	Voters	For	Against	Abstain	Percentage
Liu Qi	65	Jiangxi	Communist Party Secretary of Jiangxi	2,952	2,952	0	0	100.00%
Presidential Election
Candidates	Age	Constituency	Main public experience(s)	Voters	For	Against	Abstain	Percentage
Xi Jinping	69	Jiangsu	General Secretary of CCP; President; Chairman of CMC	2,952	2,952	0	0	100.00%
Vice Presidential Election
Candidates	Age	Constituency	Main public experience(s)	Voters	For	Against	Abstain	Percentage
Han Zheng	68	Shandong	Vice Premier	2,952	2,952	0	0	100.00%
CMC Chairmanship Election
Candidates	Age	Constituency	Main public experience(s)	Voters	For	Against	Abstain	Percentage
Xi Jinping	69	Jiangsu	General Secretary of CCP; President; Chairman of the CMC	2,952	2,952	0	0	100.00%
CMC Vice Chairmanship Election
Candidates	Age	Constituency	Main public experience(s)	Voters	For	Against	Abstain	Percentage
Zhang Youxia	72	PLA and PAP	Vice Chairman of the CMC	2,947	2,944	1	2	99.90%
He Weidong	65	PLA and PAP	Commander of the Eastern Theater Command	2,947	2,947	0	0	100.00%
Premier Nomination
Candidates	Age	Constituency	Main public experience(s)	Voters	For	Against	Abstain	Percentage
Li Qiang	63	Yunnan	Communist Party Secretary of Shanghai	2,947	2,936	3	8	99.63%
Vice Premierial Nomination
Candidates	Age	Constituency	Main public experience(s)	Voters	For	Against	Abstain	Percentage
Ding Xuexiang	60	Liaoning	Member of the Politburo Standing Committee of CCP	2,946	2,944	0	2	99.93%
He Lifeng	68	Inner Mongolia	Member of the Politburo of CCP	2,946	2,943	3	0	99.90%
Zhang Guoqing	58	Tibet	Member of the Politburo of CCP	2,946	2,946	0	0	100.00%
Liu Guozhong	60	Henan	Member of the Politburo of CCP	2,946	2,946	0	0	100.00%
State Councilors Election
Candidates	Age	Constituency	Main public experience(s)	Voters	For	Against	Abstain	Percentage
Li Shangfu	65	PLA and PAP	Head of the Equipment Development Department	2,946	2,946	0	0	100.00%
Wang Xiaohong	65	Hebei	Minister of Public Security	2,946	2,946	0	0	100.00%
Wu Zhenglong	58	Heilongjiang	Communist Party Secretary of Jiangsu	2,946	2,945	1	0	99.97%
Shen Yiqin	63	Guangdong	Communist Party Secretary of Guizhou	2,946	2,943	1	2	99.90%
Qin Gang	56	Tianjin	Minister of Foreign Affairs	2,946	2,944	2	0	99.93%
Supreme People's Court Presidential Election
Candidates	Age	Constituency	Main public experience(s)	Voters	For	Against	Abstain	Percentage
Zhang Jun	66	Henan	Supreme People's Procuratorate Procurator-general	2,951	2,947	1	3	99.86%
Procurator-general Election
Candidates	Age	Constituency	Main public experience(s)	Voters	For	Against	Abstain	Percentage
Ying Yong	65	Anhui	Communist Party Secretary of Hubei	2,966	2,951	5	10	99.49%
NSC Director Election
Candidates	Age	Constituency	Main public experience(s)	Voters	For	Against	Abstain	Percentage
Liu Jinguo	68	Ningxia	Deputy Director of the National Supervisory Commission	2,947	2,943	3	1	99.86%
Liu Yuan	72	N/A	Deputy chairperson of the National People's Congress Financial and Economic Affairs Committee	2,947	1	0	0	0.03%

== Bills and proposals ==
=== Work Reports of the Government ===
Years	Reporter	Voters	For	Against	Abstain	Percentage
2004	Wen Jiabao	2,896	2,874	-	-	99.24%
2006	Wen Jiabao	2,887	2,858	17	12	99.00%
2007	Wen Jiabao	2,889	2,862	17	10	99.06%
2008	Wen Jiabao	2,929	2,885	32	12	98.50%
2009	Wen Jiabao	2,888	2,824	42	22	97.78%
2010	Wen Jiabao	2,897	2,836	36	25	97.89%
2011	Wen Jiabao	2,876	2,793	47	36	97.11%
2012	Wen Jiabao	2,864	2,725	90	49	95.15%
2013	Wen Jiabao	2,944	2,799	101	44	95.07%
2014	Li Keqiang	2,907	2,887	15	5	99.31%
2015	Li Keqiang	2,876	2,852	18	6	99.17%
2016	Li Keqiang	2,857	2,814	27	16	98.49%
2017	Li Keqiang	2,834	2,812	14	8	99.22%
2018	Li Keqiang	2,962	2,956	3	3	99.78%
2019	Li Keqiang	2,947	2,945	0	2	99.90%
2020	Li Keqiang	2,886	2,882	3	1	99.86%
2021	Li Keqiang	2,896	2,895	0	1	99.97%
2022	Li Keqiang	2,758	2,752	3	3	99.78%
2023	Li Keqiang	2,947	2,946	0	1	99.97%
2024	Li Qiang	2,900	2,895	2	3	99.83%

=== Reports of the National Economic and Social Development ===
Years	Voters	For	Against	Abstain	Percentage
2005–2006	2,881	2,731	95	55	94.79%
2006–2007	2,889	2,757	76	56	95.43%
2007–2008	2,927	2,747	125	55	93.85%
2008–2009	2,915	2,669	145	71	91.56%
2009–2010	2,901	2,704	138	59	93.21%
2010–2011	2,873	2,709	119	45	94.29%
2011–2012	2,857	2,591	185	81	90.69%
2012–2013	2,946	2,665	221	60	90.46%
2013–2014	2,904	2,760	97	47	95.04%
2014–2015	2,876	2,725	103	48	94.75%
2015–2016	2,857	2,685	129	43	93.98%
2016–2017	2,836	2,721	89	26	95.94%
2017–2018	2,962	2,902	41	19	97.97%
2018–2019	2,947	2,911	23	14	97.68%
2019–2020	2,886	2,855	20	11	98.93%
2020–2021	2,896	2,870	21	5	99.10%
2021–2022	2,758	2,730	19	9	98.98%
2022–2023	2,947	2,912	22	13	98.81%
2023–2024	2,900	2,879	10	11	99.28%

=== Reports of the Central and Local Budgets ===
Years	Voters	For	Against	Abstain	Percentage
2005–2006	2,887	2,520	256	111	87.29%
2006–2007	2,883	2,532	220	131	87.83%
2007–2008	2,926	2,462	362	102	84.14%
2008–2009	2,879	2,440	315	124	84.75%
2009–2010	2,891	2,458	317	116	85.02%
2010–2011	2,871	2,391	362	118	83.28%
2011–2012	2,860	2,291	438	131	80.10%
2012–2013	2,943	2,307	509	127	78.39%
2013–2014	2,899	2,504	293	102	86.37%
2014–2015	2,874	2,483	304	87	86.40%
2015–2016	2,856	2,467	299	90	86.38%
2016–2017	2,834	2,555	208	71	90.16%
2017–2018	2,962	2,838	87	37	95.81%
2018–2019	2,947	2,867	46	34	96.21%
2019–2020	2,885	2,831	39	15	98.13%
2020–2021	2,896	2,843	36	17	98.17%
2021–2022	2,757	2,701	41	15	97.93%
2022–2023	2,947	2,897	30	20	98.30%
2023–2024	2,900	2,876	13	11	99.17%

=== Work Reports of NPC Standing Committee ===
Years	Chairman	Voters	For	Against	Abstain	Percentage
2006	Wu Bangguo	2,885	2,780	65	40	96.36%
2007	Wu Bangguo	2,886	2,826	30	30	97.92%
2008	Wu Bangguo	2,926	2,846	57	23	97.27%
2009	Wu Bangguo	2,888	2,721	99	68	94.22%
2010	Wu Bangguo	2,902	2,828	43	31	97.45%
2011	Wu Bangguo	2,875	2,756	82	37	95.86%
2012	Wu Bangguo	2,858	2,737	77	44	95.77%
2013	Wu Bangguo	2,944	2,733	150	61	92.83%
2014	Zhang Dejiang	2,902	2,784	74	44	95.93%
2015	Zhang Dejiang	2,873	2,772	68	33	96.48%
2016	Zhang Dejiang	2,855	2,762	70	23	96.74%
2017	Zhang Dejiang	2,834	2,793	24	17	98.55%
2018	Zhang Dejiang	2,962	2,922	22	18	98.65%
2019	Li Zhanshu	2,945	2,909	19	17	98.68%
2020	Li Zhanshu	2,886	2,875	9	2	99.62%
2021	Li Zhanshu	2,896	2,883	6	7	99.55%
2022	Li Zhanshu	2,757	2,747	9	1	99.60%
2023	Li Zhanshu	2,946	2,931	11	4	99.46%
2024	Zhao Leji	2,900	2,888	7	5	99.58%

=== Work Reports of the Supreme People's Court ===
Years	Reporter	Voters	For	Against	Abstain	Percentage
2005	Wang Shengjun	~2,900	~2,204	-	-	~76.00%
2006	Wang Shengjun	2,882	2,257	479	146	78.31%
2007	Wang Shengjun	2,881	2,395	359	127	83.13%
2008	Wang Shengjun	2,928	2,287	521	120	78.11%
2009	Wang Shengjun	2,883	2,172	519	192	75.34%
2010	Wang Shengjun	2,896	2,289	479	128	79.04%
2011	Wang Shengjun	2,872	2,242	475	155	78.06%
2012	Wang Shengjun	2,855	2,311	429	115	80.95%
2013	Wang Shengjun	2,943	2,218	605	120	75.37%
2014	Zhou Qiang	2,898	2,425	378	95	83.69%
2015	Zhou Qiang	2,876	2,619	213	44	91.06%
2016	Zhou Qiang	2,854	2,600	208	46	91.10%
2017	Zhou Qiang	2,835	2,606	180	45	91.92%
2018	Zhou Qiang	2,835	2,806	132	23	94.77%
2019	Zhou Qiang	2,948	2,725	156	67	92.44%
2020	Zhou Qiang	2,886	2,794	76	16	96.81%
2021	Zhou Qiang	2,896	2,800	65	31	96.69%
2022	Zhou Qiang	2,757	2,652	76	29	96.16%
2023	Zhou Qiang	2,947	2,880	40	27	97.73%
2024	Zhang Jun	2,900	2,834	44	22	97.72%

=== Work Reports of the Supreme People's Procuratorate ===
Years	Reporter	Voters	For	Against	Abstain	Percentage
2005	Jia Chunwang	~2,900	~2209	-	-	~76.20%
2006	Jia Chunwang	2,883	2,361	363	159	81.89%
2007	Jia Chunwang	2,884	2,414	342	128	83.70%
2008	Jia Chunwang	2,926	2,270	514	142	77.58%
2009	Cao Jianming	2,877	2,210	505	162	76.82%
2010	Cao Jianming	2,899	2,341	411	147	80.75%
2011	Cao Jianming	2,870	2,306	434	130	80.35%
2012	Cao Jianming	2,854	2,349	393	112	82.31%
2013	Cao Jianming	2,945	2,239	485	121	76.03%
2014	Cao Jianming	2,900	2,402	390	108	82.83%
2015	Cao Jianming	2,880	2,529	284	61	87.81%
2016	Cao Jianming	2,850	2,560	239	51	89.82%
2017	Cao Jianming	2,832	2,606	180	46	92.02%
2018	Cao Jianming	2,960	2,781	138	43	93.95%
2019	Zhang Jun	2,944	2,843	71	31	96.57%
2020	Zhang Jun	2,885	2,811	58	16	97.43%
2021	Zhang Jun	2,896	2,822	52	22	97.44%
2022	Zhang Jun	2,757	2,682	47	23	96.16%
2023	Zhang Jun	2,947	2,874	49	24	97.52%
2024	Ying Yong	2,900	2,864	27	9	98.76%

=== Laws ===
Years	Laws	Voters	For	Against	Abstain	Percentage
2005	Anti-Secession Law	2,898	2,896	0	2	99.93%
2007	Property Law	2,888	2,799	52	37	96.92%
2007	Enterprise Income Tax Law	2,885	2,826	37	22	97.95%
2010	Election Law Amendment	2,902	2,747	108	47	94.66%
2012	9th Criminal Procedure Law Amendment	2,856	2,639	160	57	92.40%
2015	Legislation Law Amendment	2,875	2,761	81	33	96.03%
2016	Charity Law	2,850	2,636	131	83	92.49%
2017	General Principles of the Civil Law	2,833	2,782	30	21	98.20%
2018	Supervision Law	2,960	2,914	28	18	98.45%
2019	Foreign Investment Law	2,945	2,929	8	8	99.46%
2020	Civil Code	2,886	2,879	2	5	99.76%
2020	Decision on Hong Kong national security legislation	2,885	2,878	1	6	99.76%
2021	National People's Congress Organic Law Amendment	2,896	2,890	2	4	99.79%
2021	National People's Congress Rules Procedure Amendment	2,896	2,895	1	0	99.97%
2021	Decision on improving the electoral system of Hong Kong	2,896	2,895	0	1	99.97%
2022	Local People's Congresses and Local People's Governments at All Levels Organic Law	2,758	2,749	4	5	99.67%
2023	Legislation Law	2,952	2,948	1	3	99.86%
2024	State Council Organic Law	2,900	2,883	8	9	99.41%

=== Five-year Plans ===
Years	Terms	Voters	For	Against	Abstain	Percentage
2006–2010	11th	2,886	2,815	50	21	97.54%
2011–2015	12th	2,875	2,778	59	38	96.63%
2016–2020	13th	2,856	2,778	53	25	97.27%
2021–2025	14th	2,896	2,873	11	12	99.20%

=== Reforms of departments of the State Council ===
Years	Voters	For	Against	Abstain	Percentage
2008–2013	2,960	2,744	117	99	92.70%
2013–2018	2,957	2,875	56	26	97.23%
2018–2023	2,970	2,966	2	2	99.87%
2023–2028	2,952	2,951	1	0	99.97%

=== Drafts of electing delegates for the next term ===
Years	Sort	Voters	For	Against	Abstain	Percentage
2008–2012	All	2,860	2,792	47	41	97.62%
2008–2012	Hong Kong SAR	2,882	2,838	17	27	98.47%
2008–2012	Macau SAR	2,882	2,852	11	19	98.96%
2013–2017	All	2,856	2,712	109	35	94.96%
2013–2017	Hong Kong SAR	2,855	2,804	37	17	98.21%
2013–2017	Macau SAR	2,854	2,820	18	16	98.81%
2018–2022	All	2,836	2,787	36	13	98.27%
2018–2022	Hong Kong SAR	2,835	2,813	13	9	99.22%
2018–2022	Macau SAR	2,831	2,811	10	10	99.29%
2023–2028	All	2,757	2,750	3	4	99.71%
2023–2028	Hong Kong SAR	2,757	2,751	3	3	99.75%
2023–2028	Macau SAR	2,757	2,756	1	0	99.93%

=== NPCSC Members' resignations ===
A member of the Standing Committee may not hold office in the administrative, judicial or procuratorial organs of the state. If he expects to hold such an office, he must first resign from his post in the Standing Committee.

— Organic Law of the National People's Congress of the People's Republic of China

Years	Members	New office	Voters	For	Against	Abstain	Percentage
2010	Li Dongsheng	Vice Minister of the Public Security	2,881	2,632	58	191	91.36%
2011	Ni Yuefeng	Vice Governor of Fujian	2,861	2,635	81	145	92.10%
2014	Wang Xiao	Vice Governor of Qinghai	2,890	2,797	38	55	96.78%
2014	Chen Sixi	Deputy Director of the Liaison Office of the Central People's Government in the Macau S.A.R.	2,890	2,797	38	55	96.78%
2015	Chen Jining	Minister of Environmental Protection	2,867	2,792	33	42	97.38%
2015	Chen Hao	Governor of Yunnan	2,867	2,792	33	42	97.38%
2016	Huang Runqiu	Vice Minister of the Environmental Protection	2,846	2,745	44	57	96.45%
2017	Xu Xianming	Vice Procurator-General of the Supreme People's Procuratorate	2,823	2,749	27	47	97.38%
2019	Zhang Rongshun	Deputy Director of the Macau Liaison Office	2,944	2,909	12	23	98.68%
2020	Feng Zhonghua		2,884	2,853	10	21	98.89%

== List of low approval rates ==
As of 2021, there have been no votes that were rejected by the National People's Congress, but some events have received comparatively low approving rates. This list include reported events which received below 70%.

Years	Events	Voters	For	Against	Abstain	Not voting	Percentage
1989	Give more legislative power to Shenzhen to improve economy	2,970	1,891	274	805	-	63.67%
1992	Build Three Gorges Dam	2,608	1,767	177	664	-	67.75%
1995	Appoint Jiang Chunyun as the Vice Premier	~2,977	~1,905	-	-	-	~64.00%
1997	Work Report of the Supreme People's Procuratorate	~2,720	~1621	-	-	-	~59.60%
2013	Vote for the name list of the NPC Environment Protection and Resources Conservation Committee	2,944	1,969	850	125	-	66.88%

=== Standing Committee votes ===
Despite the historical lack of resolution disapproval, there was one event in April 1999 where a bill was rejected by the National People's Congress Standing Committee. The bill was the Amendment Bill to the Highway Law which proposed to replace highway tolls with a fuel tax. The bill failed to be approved by a majority of members present, falling shy by just one vote. The amendment bill would eventually be passed later that year in October.

Years	Events	Voters	For	Against	Abstain	Not voting	Percentage
1999	Amendment Bill to the Highway Law	154	77	6	42	29	50%

== See also ==
- Politics of China
  - Elections in China
  - National People's Congress
