= Qian Yin'an =

Chinese politician

- 钱引安

Secretary-General of the CCP Shaanxi Provincial Committee
- In office May 2017 – November 2018
- Preceded by: Liu Xiaoyan
- Succeeded by: Lu Jianjun

Communist Party Secretary of Baoji
- In office November 2015 – May 2017
- Preceded by: Shangguan Jiqing
- Succeeded by: Xu Qifang

Mayor of Baoji
- In office December 2013 – January 2016
- Preceded by: Shangguan Jiqing
- Succeeded by: Hui Jincai

Personal details
- Born: November 1964 (age 61) Xi'an, Shaanxi, China
- Party: Chinese Communist Party (1987–2019; expelled)
- Children: 1
- Education: Xi'an Vocational and Technical College; Northwest University

Chinese name
- Traditional Chinese: 錢引安
- Simplified Chinese: 钱引安
Transcriptions
Standard Mandarin
- Hanyu Pinyin: Qián Yǐn'ān

Qian Yin'an (Chinese: 钱引安; born November 1964) is a Chinese politician who spent his entire career in his home-province Shaanxi. He entered the workforce in August 1983, and joined the Chinese Communist Party in March 1987. He was investigated by the Chinese Communist Party's anti-graft agency in November 2018. Previously he served as Secretary General of the CCP Shaanxi Provincial Committee. He is the second Standing Committee member of the CCP Provincial Committee caught after the 19th National Congress of the Chinese Communist Party.

Qian was a member of the 19th National Congress of the Chinese Communist Party.

== Early life and education ==
Qian was born in Xi'an, Shaanxi, in November 1964. After resuming the college entrance examination, he graduated from Xi'an Vocational and Technical College.

== Career ==
In August 1983 he was appointed as an official in a township of Baqiao District in Xi'an city and over a period of 15 years worked his way up to the position of District Head, the year he was only 34.

In March 2000 Qian was promoted to become Magistrate and Deputy Communist Party Secretary of Chang'an County (now Chang'an District), and held that offices until January 2003, when he was promoted again to become Communist Party Secretary, the top political position in the district, from 2003 to 2007. Qian became the Communist Party Secretary of Yanta District in March 2007, and served until December 2009. At the end of 2009, Qian rose to become vice-mayor of Xi'an. Shortly after he took office, traffic accidents have become one of the biggest killers, which made him take the lead in the press conference to apologize to the public. In Xi'an, Qian worked with Sun Qingyun and Wei Minzhou as their subordinates for about 10 years.

In late 2013, Qian was named acting mayor and Deputy Communist Party Secretary of Baoji, a prefecture-level city in western Shaanxi province, and then Communist Party Secretary, the top political position in the city, beginning in November 2015. During his short term he focused on real estate development projects in Qinling Mountains called "Tiantai Mountain-Jifeng Mountain-Yinxiang River" (Chinese: 天台山—鸡峰山—茵香河), which damaged the local ecological environment and shocked central government leaders.

At the middle of 2017, he was elevated to Secretary General of the CCP Shaanxi Provincial Committee. He became a member of the Standing Committee of the CCP Shaanxi Provincial Committee since May 2017.

== Downfall ==
On November 1, 2018, Qian has been placed under investigation for serious violations of laws and regulations by the Central Commission for Discipline Inspection (CCDI), the party's internal disciplinary body, and the National Supervisory Commission, the highest anti-corruption agency of China.

He was expelled from the Party on April 29, 2019. His qualification as delegate to the 19th CCP National Congress has been terminated. On May 14, he was arrested for suspected bribe taking. On August 8, Qian stood trial for taking bribes at the Intermediate People's Court of Guangzhou. The public prosecutors accused him of abusing his multiple positions between 2001 and 2017 in Shaanxi to seek benefits on behalf of certain organizations and individuals in contracting projects, advancing construction and gaining job promotions and then accepted bribes of more than 63.13 million yuan ($8.96 million) in return. On December 10, Qian was sentenced by the Guangzhou Intermediate People's Court to 14 years in prison and fined 5 million yuan ($775,500). Qian accepted his sentencing and pledged not to appeal the court's decision.

== Personal life ==
Qian is married and has a son.

Party political offices
Preceded by Shangguan Jiqing	Communist Party Secretary of Baoji; 2015–2017	Succeeded by Xu Qifang (徐启方)
Preceded by Liu Xiaoyan (刘小燕)	Secretary General of the CCP Shaanxi Provincial Committee; 2017–2018	Succeeded by Lu Jianjun (卢建军)
Government offices
Preceded by Shangguan Jiqing	Mayor of Baoji; 2013–2016	Succeeded by Hui Jincai (惠进才)
