= Liu Chunjie =

Chinese model

- Born: 刘春杰; 1997 (age 28–29); Henan, China
- Occupation: Model
- Years active: 2016–present
- Modeling information
- Height: 1.78 m (5 ft 10 in)
- Hair color: Black
- Eye color: Brown
- Agency: Women Management (Milan); Munich Models (Munich); Select Model Management (London); Supreme Management (New York); Supreme Management (Paris)

Liu Chunjie (Chinese: 刘春杰, born 1997) is a Chinese female model, born in 1997 in Henan Province, and a graduate of Xi'an University of Technology.

She made her debut as the champion of the 16th China Professional Model Contest in 2016 and has since amassed over 300 work records with various major fashion brands, magazines, and fashion weeks.
