= Wang Xiao =

Wang Xiao may refer to:

- Wang Xiao (politician) (王晓) (born 1968), Chinese politician; party chief of Xining
- Wang Xiao (footballer, born 1979) (王霄), Chinese football defender
- Wang Xiao (footballer, born 1992) (王啸), Chinese football forward
- Wang Xiao (rugby union) (born 1998), Chinese rugby sevens player
- Wang Xiao (actor), Chinese actor; named Best Supporting Actor at the 37th Golden Rooster Awards
