= Shan Zhongde =

Chinese engineer (born 1970)

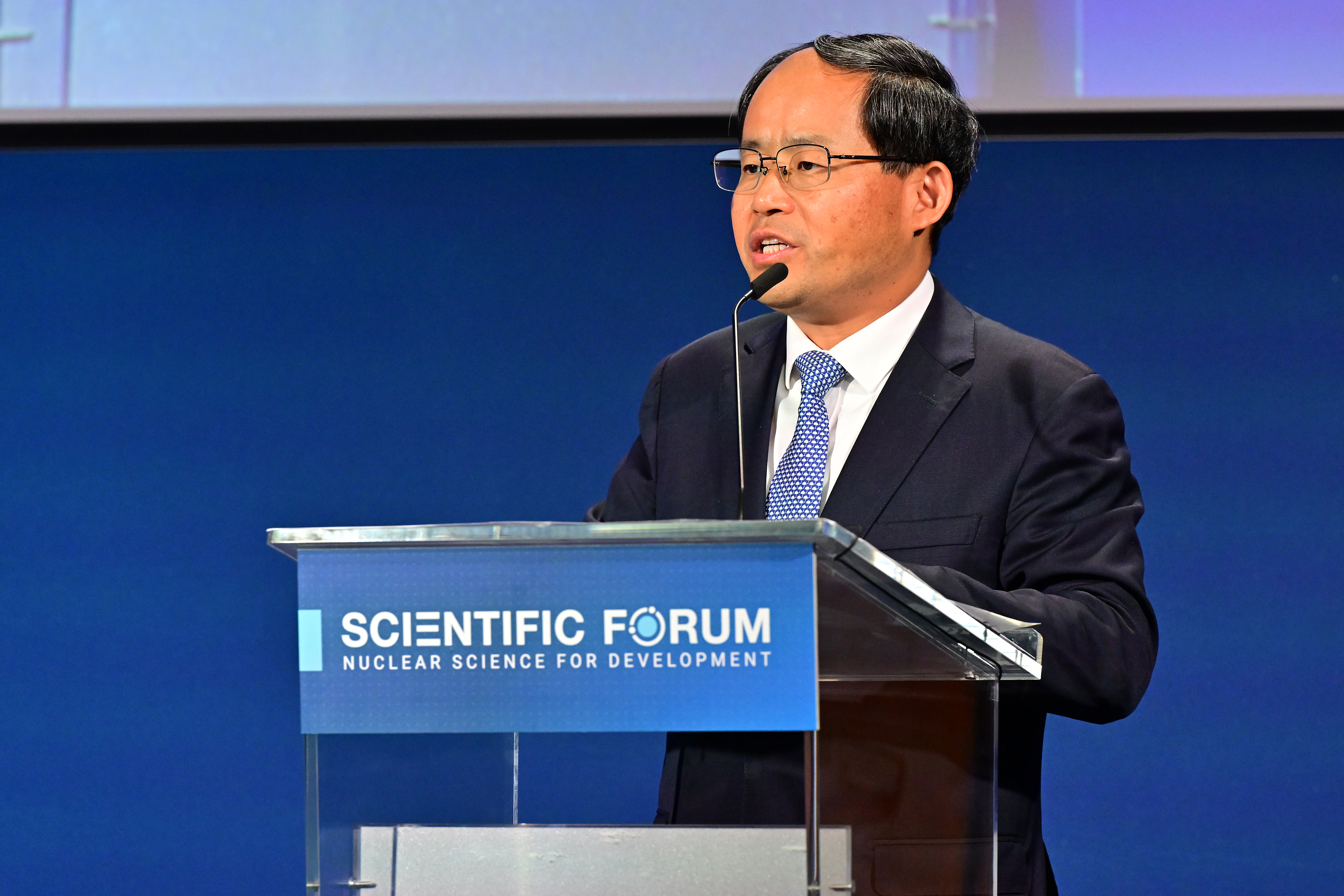
- Shan Zhongde, Scientific Forum 2025
- Born: January 1970 (age 56); Gaomi, Shandong, China
- Education: Xi'an University of Technology; Tsinghua University
- Scientific career
- Fields: Machine manufacturing
- Workplaces: China Academy of Machinery Science and Technology Group Co., Ltd.

Chinese name
- Traditional Chinese: 單忠德
- Simplified Chinese: 单忠德
Transcriptions
Standard Mandarin
- Hanyu Pinyin: Shàn Zhōngdé

Shan Zhongde (Chinese: 单忠德; born January 1970) is a Chinese engineer and currently one of the Deputy Ministers of Industry and Information Technology of China. He previously served as researcher and doctoral supervisor of China Academy of Machinery Science and Technology.

== Biography ==
Shan was born in Gaomi, Shandong, in January 1970. He received his master's degree and doctor's degree from Xi'an University of Technology in 1993 and 1996, respectively. In 2002 he obtained his doctor's degree from Tsinghua University. Then he became a visiting scholar at Cardiff University. he was a postdoctoral fellow at Tsinghua University between 2003 and 2006.

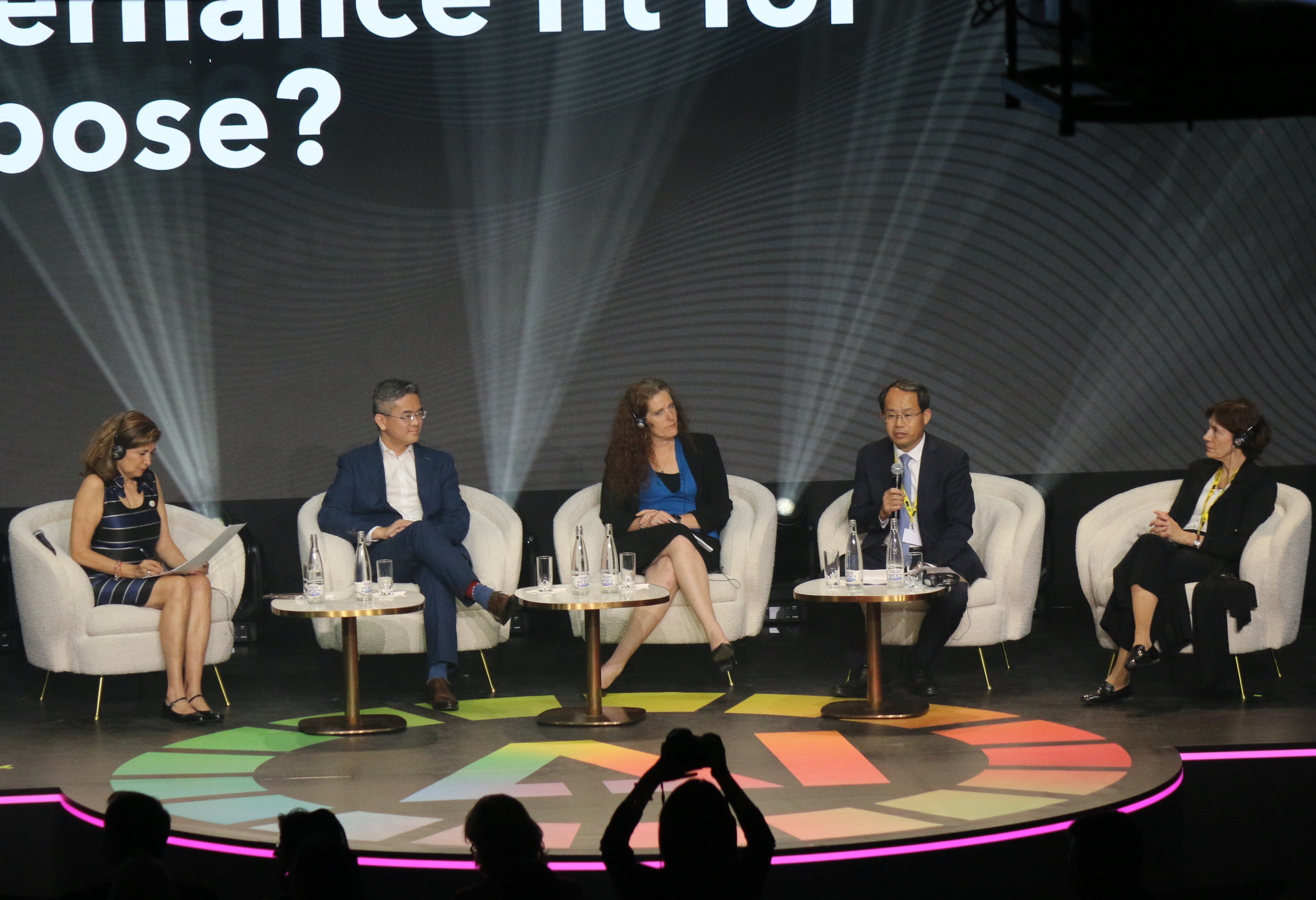
Shan at the 2025 AI for Good Summit in Geneva

In 2014 he was appointed vice-president of China Academy of Machinery Science and Technology. He has been deputy general manager of China Academy of Machinery Science and Technology Group Co., Ltd. since March 2018.

In June 2020, he was appointed as head of the Nanjing University of Aeronautics and Astronautics and in November of the same year, he was appointed the chief of the Chinese Communist Party committee at the university. In February 2024, he was appointed as one of the deputy ministers of Industry and Information Technology.

== Honours and awards ==
- 2015 National Science Fund for Distinguished Young Scholars
- 2015 Technology Innovation Award of the Ho Leung Ho Lee Foundation
- November 22, 2019 Member of the Chinese Academy of Engineering (CAE)
