= Xi'an University of Technology =

University in Xi'an, Shaanxi, China

Coordinates: 34°15′12″N 108°59′42″E

- 西安理工大学
- Former names: Beijing Institute of Machinery; Shaanxi University of Technology; Shaanxi Institute of Machinery
- Motto: 祖国、荣誉、责任
- Motto in English: Motherland, Honor, Responsibility
- Type: Public university
- Established: May 1, 1949
- President: Li Xiaolian
- Communist Party Secretary: Liu De'an
- Academic staff: 1,672
- Students: 18,000
- Location: Xi'an, Shaanxi, China
- Campus: Urban 1,352,000 square metres (14,550,000 sq ft)
- Colors: PurpleGold
- Website: old.xaut.edu.cn/English/

Chinese name
- Simplified Chinese: 西安理工大学
- Traditional Chinese: 西安理工大學
Transcriptions
Standard Mandarin
- Hanyu Pinyin: Xī'ān Lǐgōng Dàxué

Xi'an University of Technology (Chinese: 西安理工大学; XUT) is a provincial public comprehensive university in Xi'an, Shaanxi, China. The university is co-sponsored by the Ministry of Industry and Information Technology and the Shaanxi Provincial Government.

As of February 2019, the university has 3 campuses, a combined student body of 18,000 students and 1,672 faculty members. The university consists of 16 faculties and 1 department.

At present, the university has 32 national and provincial key scientific research bases, including 1 National Key Laboratory, 1 National Engineering Research Center, 2 Key Laboratories of the Ministry of education, 1 Engineering Research Center of the Ministry of Education, 1 Promotion Center of the Ministry of Science and Technology, and 1 Key Laboratory of the National Forestry and Grassland Administration.

== History ==
The school traces its origins to the former Beijing Institute of Machinery (北京机械学院) and Shaanxi University of Technology (陕西工业大学), founded in 1949 and 1960, respectively, and would later become Shaanxi Institute of Machinery (陕西机械学院) in 1972. In January 1994, Shaanxi Institute of Machinery was officially renamed Xi'an University of Technology, which is still used today. In 2002, Xi'an Instrument Industry School (西安仪表工业学校) was merged into the university.

=== School Day ===
The school takes the National Beiping Senior Industrial Vocational School (国立北平高级工业职业学校), the predecessor school of Beijing Institute of Machinery (北京机械学院), which was taken over by the People's Government in 1949, as the starting year of the school celebration, and May 1 is the day of the school celebration.

== Campuses ==
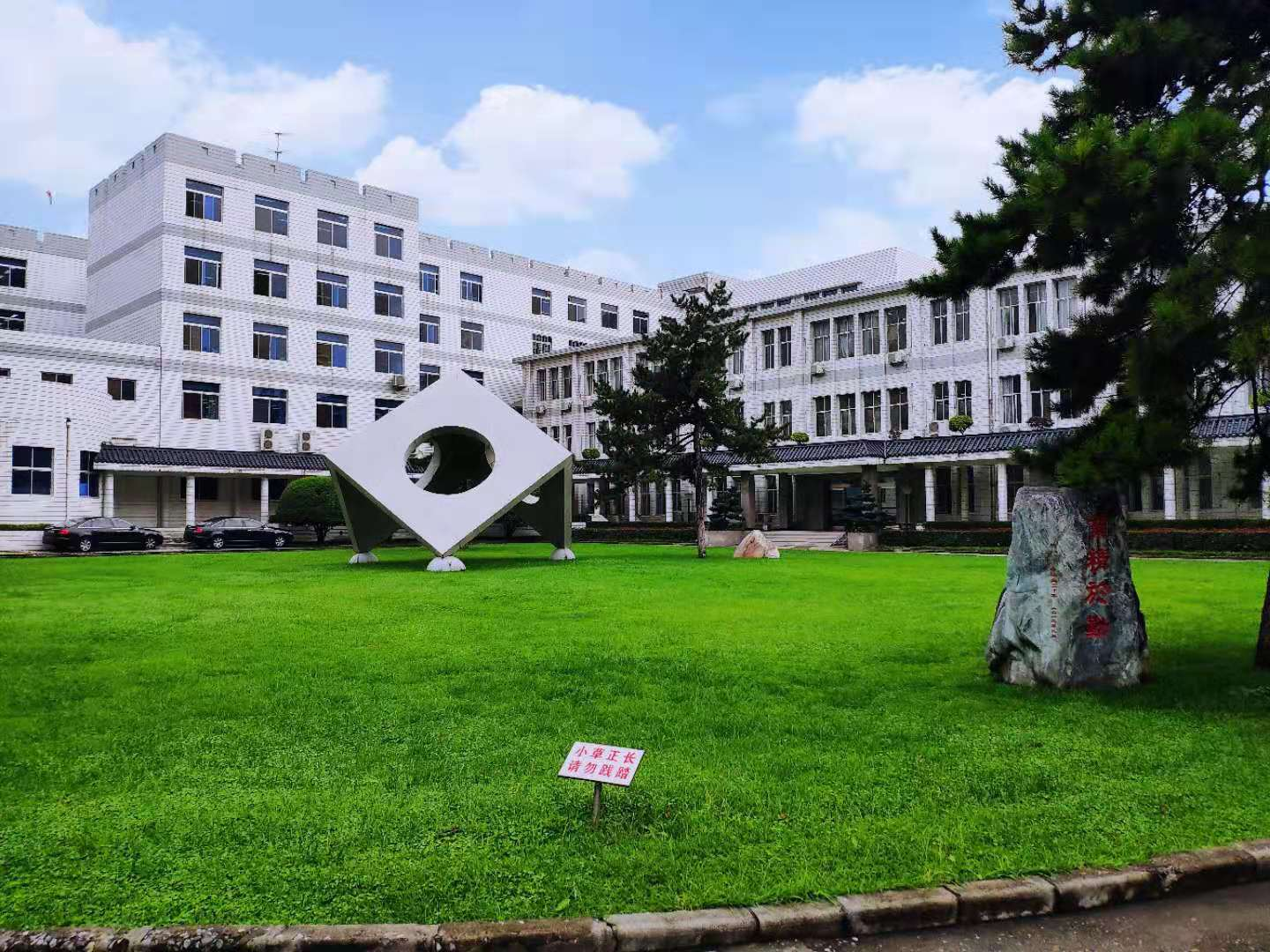
Xi'an University of Technology Jinhua Campus

=== 3 campuses: Jinhua campus, Lianhu campus and Qujiang campus. ===
Qujiang campus: Xi'an University of Technology Qujiang Campus is located at No. 58 Yanxiang Road, Xi'an, with a planned land of 10,010 mu and a building area of 354,000 square meters. The construction of Qujiang Campus was started in 2001 and put into use in 2002. Four teaching buildings, ten student apartments, three young teachers' apartments, Yifu Science and Technology Information Center, Student Activity Center, Plastic Track and Field, Engineering Training Center, Student Canteen, Swimming Pool, etc. have been built, which can satisfy the study and living requirements of more than 10,000 students.

Undergraduate and graduate students of the School of Electricity, the School of Management, the School of Science, the School of Humanities, the Department of Civics and Politics, the School of Arts, and first- and second-year students of other colleges study and live on the Qujiang Campus. Xi'an Metro Line 5 has a station at the Qujiang Campus of Polytechnic University on the southeast side of the campus.

=== Historical Remains ===
The Han tomb: In February 2004, a precious Han Dynasty tomb was discovered at the construction site of the Qujiang Campus of Xi'an University of Technology, with well-preserved, colorful and rich murals. These murals not only depict images related to the ascension of the tomb owner's soul to heaven, such as dragons, tigers, cranes, feathered men, the sun, the moon, and clouds, but also show scenes of secular life, such as traveling on carriages and horses, hunting, feasts and cockfights, which were popular during the Eastern Han period, and have greatly enriched the contents of the murals in Western Han tombs in Guanzhong region. However, due to the absence of epitaphs in the Han tombs, it is still impossible to determine the identity of the tomb owners of the Western Polytechnic University Han tombs.

== Schools and Departments ==
- Faculty of Materials Science and Engineering
- Faculty of Mechanical and Precision Instrument Engineering
- Faculty of Automation and Information Engineering
- Faculty of Water Resources and Hydroelectric Engineering
- Faculty of Printing and Packaging Engineering
- Faculty of Economics and Management
- Faculty of Sciences
- Faculty of Humanities and Foreign Languages
- Faculty of Computer Science and Engineering
- Faculty of Civil Engineering and Architecture
- Faculty of Art and Design
- Faculty of Further Education
- Faculty of Higher Vacational and Technical Education

== Library ==
As of May 2015, the library has collected more than 1.88 million volumes of paper documents, about 3.29 million volumes of electronic documents, more than 2,300 kinds of paper-based Chinese and foreign journals, and more than 10,000 kinds of full-text electronic journals.

== Culture ==
- Motto: Motherland, Honor, Responsibility
- University newspaper: Journal of Xi'an University of Technology

== Notable alumni ==
- Shan Zhongde, member of the Chinese Academy of Engineering (CAE)
- Li Peicheng, Chinese agricultural soil and water engineering and water resources and environmental engineer, and an academician of the Chinese Academy of Engineering.
- Wei Minzhou, former Secretary of the Xi'an Municipal Committee, Deputy Secretary of the Party Group and Deputy Director of the Standing Committee of the Shaanxi Provincial People's Congress.
- Zhang Boxing, Served as Governor of Shaanxi Province and Secretary of the Provincial Party Committee.
