= Li Mingyuan (politician) =

Chinese politician

- 李明远

Mayor of Xi'an
- In office 18 February 2019 – 4 April 2023
- Preceded by: Shangguan Jiqing
- Succeeded by: Ye Niuping

Party Secretary of Weinan
- In office January 2018 – January 2019
- Preceded by: Lu Zhiyuan
- Succeeded by: Wei Jianfeng

Mayor of Weinan
- In office March 2015 – March 2018
- Preceded by: Xi Zhengping
- Succeeded by: Li Yi

Personal details
- Born: 30 August 1965 (age 61) Wuqi County, Shaanxi, China
- Party: Chinese Communist Party
- Education: Tsinghua University; Xidian University

Chinese name
- Traditional Chinese: 李明遠
- Simplified Chinese: 李明远
Transcriptions
Standard Mandarin
- Hanyu Pinyin: LǐMíngyuǎn

Li Mingyuan (Chinese: 李明远; born 30 August 1965) is a Chinese politician who currently serves as a member of the Standing Committee of Shaanxi Provincial CCP Committee and head of its United Front Work Department. He was the Deputy Party Secretary and Mayor of Xi'an from 2019 to 2023.

== Biography ==
Li was born in Wuqi County, Shaanxi, in 30 August 1965. After the resumption of College Entrance Examination, he graduated from Tsinghua University and Xidian University. After university, he was assigned to the Xi'an Huanghe Electrical and Mechanical Co., Ltd. and worked there for four years.

In June 1995 he joined the Xi'an Institute of Posts and Telecommunications as a teacher.

In 2001, at the age of 36, he made a crossover from education to politics. In May he became deputy head of Shaanxi Provincial Information Industry Department, three years later he was appointed deputy secretary-general of Shaanxi Provincial Government. In February 2013 he was head of Shaanxi Provincial Science and Technology Department, and held that office until January 2015, when he was transferred to Weinan and appointed Chinese Communist Party Deputy Committee Secretary and acting mayor and then mayor there. On February 1, 2019, he was elected vice-mayor and acting mayor of Xi'an, capital of northwest China's Shaanxi, replacing Shangguan Jiqing, who took the fall for the failed eco-environmental renovation operation of Qinling. He was installed as mayor of Xi'an on February 18.

In 2023, he was appointed as a member of the Standing Committee of Shaanxi Provincial Party Committee and head of its United Front Work Department.

Government offices
Preceded by Xi Zhengping	Mayor of Weinan; 2015–2018	Succeeded by Li Yi
Preceded by Shangguan Jiqing	Mayor of Xi'an; 2019–2023	Succeeded by Ye Niuping
Party political offices
Preceded by Lu Zhiyuan	Communist Party Secretary of Weinan; 2018–2019	Succeeded by Wei Jianfeng
