= Shangguan Jiqing =

Chinese politician

- 上官吉庆

Mayor of Xi'an
- In office February 2016 – 5 November 2018
- Preceded by: Dong Jun
- Succeeded by: Li Mingyuan (acting)

Communist Party Secretary of Baoji
- In office December 2013 – October 2015
- Preceded by: Tang Junchang
- Succeeded by: Qian Yin'an

Mayor of Baoji
- In office February 2012 – December 2013
- Preceded by: Dai Zhengshe
- Succeeded by: Qian Yin'an

Magistrate of Xunyi County
- In office June 1995 – November 1997
- Preceded by: Liang Fengmin
- Succeeded by: Cao Xingwei

Personal details
- Born: Cao Xingwei; March 1963 (age 63) Qian County, Shaanxi, China
- Party: Chinese Communist Party
- Education: Shaanxi Business School; Central Party School of the Chinese Communist Party; Northwest University

Chinese name
- Traditional Chinese: 上官吉慶
- Simplified Chinese: 上官吉庆
Transcriptions
Standard Mandarin
- Hanyu Pinyin: Shàngguān Jíqìng

Shangguan Jiqing (Chinese: 上官吉庆; born March 1963) is a Chinese politician who spent his whole career in his home-province Shaanxi. He served as mayor of Xi'an between 2016 and 2018 but appeared to have been embroiled in a local scandal involving several other high-ranking officials. He was demoted to an insignificant position and put under probation by the disciplinary organs of the Chinese Communist Party in late 2018.

== Career ==
Shangguan Jiqing was born in March 1963 in Qian County, Shaanxi.

After graduating from Shaanxi Business School in August 1980, Shangguan Jiqing entered politics as a local official in Xiyang Town of Sanyuan County. Shangguan Jiqing joined the Chinese Communist Party in April 1982. In July 1982 he was appointed as an official in the county's Bureau of Finance and over a period of ten years worked his way up to the position of Director.

In January 1995 he was transferred to Xunyi County and served as its deputy magistrate. In December 1995 he was promoted to become the Magistrate, a position he held until August 1998, when he was transferred again to Bin County. He served as magistrate from August 1998 to October 1999, and Communist Party Secretary, the top political position in the county, from October 1999 to December 2002.

He became the vice-mayor of Xianyang in April 2004 and served until November 2004. He was deputy director of Shaanxi Provincial Department of Finance in November 2004, and held that office until August 2008.

In August 2008 he was appointed vice-mayor of Baoji, and three years later promoted to mayor. He then served as Communist Party Secretary, the top political position in the city, from 2013 to 2015.

In October 2015 he was promoted to Deputy Communist Party Secretary of Xi'an, capital of northwest China's Shaanxi province. He concurrently served as mayor in February 2016.

== Downfall ==
On October 29, 2018, Shangguan Jiqing was placed on probation within the Communist Party. The party suspended his party membership and also demoted him. The government confiscated his illegal gains.

Shangguan Jiqing was removed from the Communist Party and government's websites on November 2, 2018, without any official explanation. On November 5, 2018, he resigned from the mayor of Xi'an. On November 9, he was removed from membership of China's top parliamentary body, the National People's Congress. Soon after, former Shaanxi party chief Zhao Zhengyong was also put under investigation. It was revealed in state television footage in January 2019 that Shangguan had been handed a two-year suspension from the party and demoted to a "non-leading deputy department level position (副厅级; futingji)," which was two grades lower than his previous position.

Government offices
Preceded by Liang Fengmin (梁凤民)	Magistrate of Xunyi County; 1995-1997	Succeeded by Cao Xingwei (曹兴魏)
Preceded by Dai Zhengshe (戴征社)	Mayor of Baoji; 2011-2013	Succeeded by Qian Yin'an (钱引安)
Preceded by Dong Jun (董军)	Mayor of Xi'an; 2016-2018	Succeeded by Li Mingyuan (acting)
Party political offices
Preceded by Tang Junchang (唐俊昌)	Communist Party Secretary of Baoji; 2013-2015	Succeeded by Qian Yin'an (钱引安)
