= Hao Huijie =

Chinese politician

- 蒿慧杰

Party Secretary of Xi'an
- Incumbent
- Assumed office 16 January 2026
- Deputy: Ye Niuping (mayor)
- Preceded by: Fang Hongwei

Party Secretary of Yan'an
- In office 19 January 2023 – 16 January 2026
- Deputy: Yan Hanping; Guo Zhuguo
- Preceded by: Zhao Gang
- Succeeded by: Wang Haipeng

Head of the Publicity Department of the Shaanxi Provincial Committee of the Chinese Communist Party
- In office June 2022 – January 2023
- Preceded by: Wang Xiao
- Succeeded by: Sun Daguang

Deputy Governor of Shaanxi
- In office 29 September 2021 – 28 July 2022
- Governor: Zhao Yide

Personal details
- Born: October 1968 (age 57–58) Zhongmu County, Henan, China
- Party: Chinese Communist Party
- Education: Wuhan University; Zhengzhou University

Hao Huijie (Chinese: 蒿慧杰; pinyin: Hāo Huìjié; born October 1968) is a Chinese politician, currently serving as the Party Secretary of Xi'an since January 2026.

== Career ==
=== Henan ===
Hao was born in Zhongmu County, Henan. He has worked in Henan for long time, which served as the deputy director of Henan Finance Department, the deputy secretary-general of the Henan Provincial People's Government etc.

In September 2016, Hao was appointed as the acting mayor of Luohe, and elected in June 2017. During the acting period, he was served as the deputy head of the Second Central Inspection Team.

In December 2017, Hao was appointed as the party secretary of Luohe. He was transferred to Zhumadian and served as the party secretary in July 2021.

=== Shaanxi ===
In September 2021, Hao was transferred to Shaanxi, and served as the deputy governor. In May 2022, he was appointed as the standing member of the Shaanxi Provincial Committee of the Chinese Communist Party, and served as the head of the Publicity Department in June.

In January 2023, Hao was appointed as the party secretary of Yan'an. In January 2026, he was appointed as the party secretary of Xi'an.

Party political offices
Preceded by Fang Hongwei	Party Secretary of Xi'an; 2026–	Incumbent
Preceded by Zhao Gang	Party Secretary of Yan'an; 2023–2026	Succeeded by Wang Haipeng
Preceded by Wang Xiao	Head of the Publicity Department of the Shaanxi Provincial Committee of the Chinese Communist Party; 2022–2023	Succeeded by Sun Daguang
