= Elections in China =

Elections in the People's Republic of China occur under a one-party authoritarian political system controlled by the Chinese Communist Party (CCP). By law, all elections at all levels must adhere to the leadership of the CCP.

Since the 1949 proclamation of the People's Republic of China, elections have been highly constrained by the CCP's monopoly on power, limitations on free speech, and party control over nominations. Elections are not pluralistic as no opposition is allowed. Limited direct elections, except in the special administrative regions of Hong Kong and Macau, have occurred only at the local level people's congresses and village committees, with all candidate nominations preapproved by the CCP. Rory Truex, a researcher of Chinese politics at Princeton University, states that "the CCP tightly controls the nomination and election processes at every level in the people's congress system...the tiered, indirect electoral mechanism in the People's Congress system ensures that deputies at the highest levels face no semblance of electoral accountability to the Chinese citizenry."

Local people's congresses are directly elected under the control of the CCP. All higher levels of people's congresses up to the National People's Congress (NPC), the supreme organ of state power, are indirectly elected by the people's congress of the level immediately below. Candidate nominations at all levels are controlled by the CCP with its supreme position enshrined in the country's constitution.

== Electoral system ==
The Constitution and Electoral Law outline the official system for elections at each level, and detail the apparent delegation of powers, responsibilities and rights within the system, notwithstanding the power held in practice by the parallel CCP organs (see: Elections in China#Party control).

=== Direct elections ===
People's congresses of counties (县), city districts (市辖区), towns (镇), townships (乡), and ethnic townships (民族乡), are directly elected. The representative of these districts then elect the members of the People's Congress for the next administrative level: in most cases this would be the prefecture-level city. There are a few cities which are not divided into lower-level districts (不设区的市) and as such the city-wide Peoples' Congress is directly elected. Additionally, village (村) committee members and chairpersons are directly elected.

==== Local People's Congresses ====
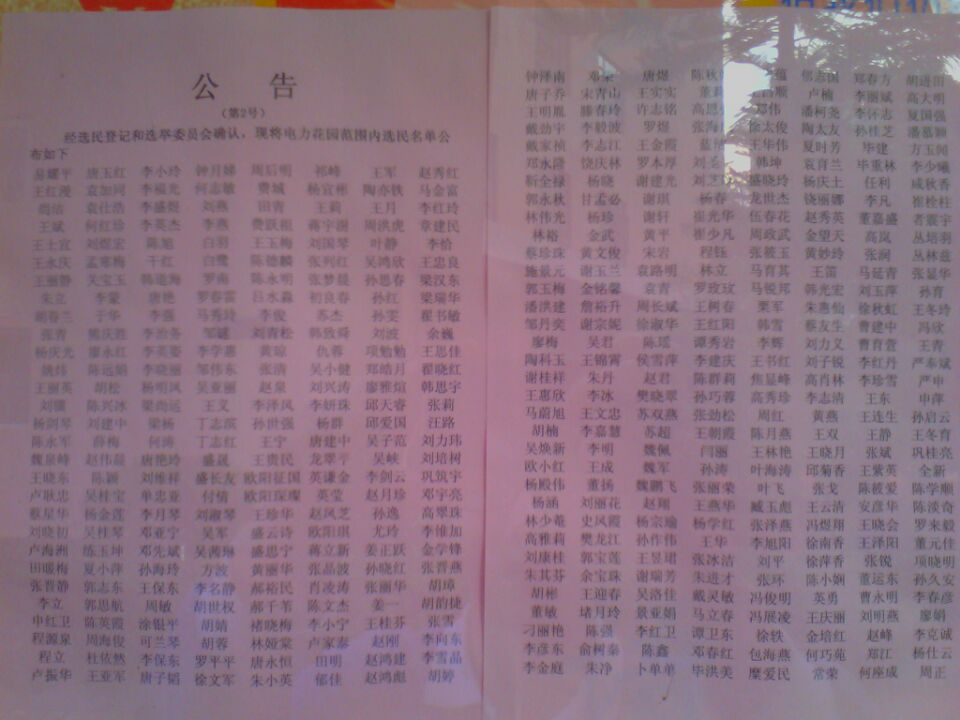
A list of voters posted in a neighbourhood in Shenzhen, Guangdong. April 11, 2014.

Under the electoral law of 1 July 1979, nomination of candidates for direct local elections (in counties, townships, etc.) can be made by the CCP, the various other political parties, mass organizations, or any voter seconded by at least 10 other voters. The final list of electoral candidates must be worked out through "discussion and consultation" or primary elections, which officially is conducted by an election committee in consultation with small groups of voters; though the candidates are chosen by CCP officials in practice. Election committee members are legally appointed by the standing committees of the people's congresses at the corresponding level. The process used for competitive races is known as the "three ups and three downs" (三上三下, sān shàng sān xià). According to the Chinese government, the "three ups and three downs" process is supposed to operate as follows:

- the election committee collates all of the nominations, checks them, and publishes the list of nominees and their basic details (first "up"). The published list is given to groups of electors, comprising the voters in each geographical or institutional electorate for discussion (first "down");
- the views of the groups of electors are conveyed via group representatives at a committee meeting, in order to reduce the number of candidates (second "up"). The views of different elector groups and the discussions at the committee meeting are then conveyed to voters, and their views are sought (second "down"); and
- the views of the groups of electors are once again collated and reported to the election committee which, by reference to the views of the majority of electors, determine the final list of candidates (third "up"). The list of names and basic details is published by electorate (third "down").

The law states that the number of candidates for a direct election should be 1.3 to 2 times the number of deputies to be elected. Where the people's congresses above the county level elect deputies at the next higher level, the number of candidates should be 1.2 to 1.5 times the number of deputies to be elected. Voting is done by secret ballot, and voters are entitled to recall elections.

Eligible voters, and their electoral districts, are chosen from the family (户籍) or work unit (单位 or dānwèi) registers for rural and urban voters, respectively, which are then submitted to the election committees after cross-examination by electoral district leaders.

Deputies are elected from either single-member districts or multi-member districts using a modified form of block combined approval voting in which a voter is allowed as many votes as there are seats to be filled (only one option may be selected per candidate), with the option to vote for or against a candidate, or abstain. The maximum number of deputies per district is three deputies, and each district within the same administrative region must have approximately an equal number of people. Candidates must obtain a majority of votes to be elected. If the number of candidates to receive over 50% of the vote is more than the number of deputies to be elected, only those who have obtained the highest vote up to the number of seats available win. A tied vote between candidates is settled with a run-off election. If the number of deputies elected is less than the number of deputies to be elected, a run-off election should be held to fill the remaining seat(s). In the run-off election, the candidate(s) who receives the most votes is elected a local deputy; however, a candidate has to win at least one-third of the votes in the run-off to be elected. Vacancies are to be filled using by-elections.

==== Heads of Local People's Governments ====
Heads of People's Governments are formally elected by the People's Congress of that level pursuant to the Organic Law on Local People's Congresses and Governments, but the heads of township governments have been experimentally elected by the people through various mechanisms. There are several models used:

- direct nomination and election (Chinese: 直推直选; pinyin: zhi tui zhi xuan)
- direction election (Chinese: 直选; pinyin: zhi xuan)
- two ballots in three rounds (Chinese: 三轮两票制; pinyin: san lun liang piao zhi)
- competition based on mass recommendation (Chinese: 民推竞选; pinyin: min tui jing xuan)
- nomination and election by the masses (海选 or hǎi xuǎn; literally "sea election")
- public recommendation and public election (Chinese: 公推公选; pinyin: gong tui gong xuan)
- vote of confidence (Chinese: 信任投票; pinyin: xin ren tou piao)

==== Village chiefs ====
After taking power in 1978, Deng Xiaoping experimented with direct democracy at the local level. Villages have been traditionally the lowest level of government in China's complicated hierarchy of governance. Under the Organic Law of Village Committees, all of China's approximately 1 million villages are expected to hold competitive, direct elections for sub-governmental village committees. A 1998 revision to the law called for improvements in the nominating process and enhanced transparency in village committee administration. The revised law also explicitly transferred the power to nominate candidates to villagers themselves, as opposed to village groups or CCP branches.

Many have criticized the locally elected representatives as serving as "rubber stamps", with the local CCP secretaries still holding the ultimate power, though during some eras the Communists have flirted with the idea of potentially allowing some competition. In the early 1980s, a few southern villages began implementing "Vote for your Chief" policies, in which free elections are intended to be held for the election of a village chief, who holds a lot of power and influence traditionally in rural society. Many of these multi-candidate elections were successful, involving candidate debates, formal platforms, and the initiation of secret ballot boxes. Initial reforms did not include universal suffrage. Such an election comprises usually no more than 2000 voters, and the first-past-the-post system is used in determining the winner, with no restriction on political affiliation. The elections, initially held every three years but later changed to five, are always supervised by a higher level of government, usually by a county-level government. Part of the reason for these early elections was to shift the responsibility of ensuring good performance and reduced corruption of local leaders from the Chinese bureaucracy to the local villagers.

Since 2018, the central authorities in the CCP officially called for the yijiantiao (一肩挑) model, in which the village committees and the CCP village committees to have the same membership, with both led by the CCP village committee secretary. It announced in a five-year plan in 2018 that one-third of the more than 500,000 "administrative villages" were already following this system, and called for at least half of the village leaderships to follow this system. This had led to tighter vetting of candidates, involving blocking activists and others deemed to transgress political sensitivities.

A 2022 study conducted by the American Economic Association looked into the implementation of village elections in rural China and the eventual decline in village autonomy in later years. The researchers suggested that this decline is linked to bureaucratic capability. As the administrative capacity at the village level strengthens, autocratic figures curtail the influence of elected bodies to reassert control.

=== Indirect elections ===
People's Congresses of provinces (省), directly administered municipalities (直辖市), and cities divided into districts (设区的市) are indirectly elected by the People's Congress of the level immediately below. Governors, mayors, and heads of counties, districts, townships and towns are legally elected by the respective local People's Congresses. Presidents of people's courts and the regional prosecutors general of people's procuratorates are legally elected by the respective local People's Congresses above the county level.

==== Local People's Governments ====
The Local People's Congress at each administrative level—other than the village level in rural areas, which hold direct elections—elects candidates for executive positions at that level of government and the Chairmen/Chairwomen of their regional People's Congress Standing Committees.

==== National People's Congress ====
The National People's Congress (NPC) has 2,977 members, elected for five year terms. Deputies are legally elected (over a three-month period) by the people's congresses of the provinces of China, autonomous regions, municipalities directly under the Central Government, as well as by electoral college in the special administrative regions of Hong Kong and Macau, and by the armed forces which function as at-large electoral districts. Generally, seats are apportioned to each electoral district in proportion to their population, though the system for apportioning seats for Hong Kong, Macau, Taiwan and the People's Liberation Army differ. No electoral district may be apportioned fewer than 15 seats in the NPC.

The NPC legally elects and appoints the following personnel:

- President of the People's Republic of China
- Vice President of the People's Republic of China
- Chairperson of the Central Military Commission (PRC)
- Director of the National Supervisory Commission
- President of the Supreme People's Court
- Procurator-General of the Supreme People's Procuratorate

The NPC also appoints the premier of the State Council based on the president's nomination, other members of the State Council based on the premier's nomination, and other members of the Central Military Commission based on the CMC chair's nomination.

== Party control ==
Elections in China occur under a political system controlled by the Chinese Communist Party (CCP), with all candidate nominations pre-approved by the CCP. CCP regulations require members of the People's Congresses, People's Governments, and People's Courts to implement CCP recommendations (including nominations). Elected leaders remain subordinate to the corresponding CCP secretary, and most are appointed by higher-level party organizations.

There are a small number of independent candidates for people's congress, particularly in neighborhoods of major cities, who sometimes campaign using Weibo. Independent candidates are strongly discouraged and face government intervention in their campaigns. In practice, the power of parties other than the CCP is eliminated. Because none of the minor parties have independent bases of support and rely on CCP approval for appointment to positions of power, none have true political power independent of the CCP. Whereas there are CCP committees in people's congresses at all levels, none of the other parties operate any form of party parliamentary groups.

== Legislation ==
The first electoral law was passed in March 1953, and the second on 1 July 1979. The 1979 law allowed for ordinary voters to nominate candidates, unlike the 1953 law which provided no such mechanism. The 1979 law was revised in 1982, removing the reference to the ability of political parties, mass organizations, and voters to use "various forms of publicity", and instead instructing that the "election committees should introduce the candidates to the voters; the political parties, mass organizations, and voters who recommend the candidates can introduce them at group meetings of the voters". In 1986, the election law was amended to disallow primary elections.

Traditionally, village chiefs were appointed by the township government. The Organic Law of Village Committees was enacted in 1987 and implemented in 1988, allowing for direct election of village chiefs instead. The 2020 revisions to the electoral law mandated that all elections at all levels must adhere to the leadership of the CCP.

== Analysis ==
The performed elections in China do not meet free and fair election criteria such as ballot access and political media access. Freedom of political speech and freedom of political assembly are all severely restricted by the government. The general Chinese public has virtually no say on how the top leaders of the country are elected. Censorship in China is widespread and political dissent is harshly punished in the country.

China is the 3rd least electorally democratic country in the world and second least electorally democratic country in Asia according to 2023 V-Dem Democracy indices. Freedom House rates the People's Republic of China as 0 out of 4 for freedom of the electoral process.

== See also ==
- Advisory Council (Qing dynasty)
- Freedom of the press in China
- Human rights in China
- Legislative system of China
- List of voting results of the National People's Congress
- National Assembly (Beiyang government)
- Politics of China
- Provisional Constitution of the Republic of China
- System of multi-party cooperation and political consultation
- Yao Lifa
