= Party Secretary of Xi'an =

Government position in China

Secretary of the Xi'an Municipal Committee of the Chinese Communist Party
- 中国共产党西安市委员会书记
- Emblem of the Chinese Communist Party

- Flag of the Chinese Communist Party
- Incumbent; Hao Huijie since 16 January 2026
- Xi'an Municipal Committee of the Chinese Communist Party
- Type: Party Committee Secretary
- Status: Deputy provincial and ministerial-level official
- Member of: Xi'an Municipal Standing Committee
- Seat: Xi'an
- Nominator: Central Committee
- Appointer: Xi'an Municipal Committee; Central Committee
- Inaugural holder: Jia Tuofu
- Formation: May 1949
- Deputy: Deputy Secretary; Secretary-General

The secretary of the Xi'an Municipal Committee of the Chinese Communist Party is the leader of the Xi'an Municipal Committee of the Chinese Communist Party (CCP). As the CCP is the sole ruling party of the People's Republic of China (PRC), the secretary is the highest ranking post in Xi'an, which outranks the mayor, conventionally being the deputy secretary of the municipal committee. The secretary is also the leader of the Standing Committee of the Xi'an Municipal Committee.

The secretary is officially appointed by the CCP Central Committee based on the recommendation of the CCP Organization Department, which is then approved by the Politburo and its Standing Committee. The secretary could also appointed by a plenary meeting of the Xi'an Municipal Committee, which the candidate must be the same as the one approved by the central government.

The current secretary is Hao Huijie, who took office on 16 January 2026.

== List of party secretaries ==
No.	English name	Chinese name	Took office	Left office	Ref.
1	Jia Tuofu	贾拓夫	May 1949	December 1949	
2	Zhao Boping	赵伯平	December 1949	March 1956	
3	Fang Zhongru	方仲如	May 1956	June 1958	
4	Zhang Ce	张策	June 1958	December 1962	
5	Peng Tianqi	彭天琦	March 1963	May 1965	
6	Xiao Chun	肖纯	May 1965	January 1967	
8	Sun Changxing	孙长兴	March 1968	December 1975	
9	Wang Lin	王林	December 1975	February 1979	
10	Chen Yuanfang	陈元方	February 1979	June 1982	
11	He Chenghua	何承华	June 1982	November 1984	
12	Dong Jichang	董继昌	November 1984	May 1988	
13	An Qiyuan	安启元	June 1988	October 1990	
14	Chen Andong	陈安东	October 1990	January 1995	
15	Cui Lintao	崔林涛	January 1995	January 2002	
16	Li Zhanshu	栗战书	January 2002	December 2003	
17	Yuan Chunqing	袁纯清	13 January 2004	16 July 2006	
18	Sun Qingyun	孙清云	16 July 2006	June 2012	
19	Wei Minzhou	魏民洲	14 June 2012	9 December 2016	
20	Wang Yongkang	王永康	9 December 2016	27 February 2019	
21	Wang Hao	王浩	3 September 2019	30 September 2021	
22	Fang Hongwei	方红卫	7 November 2021	7 November 2025	
23	Hao Huijie	蒿慧杰	16 January 2026	Incumbent	

== See also ==
- Organization of the Chinese Communist Party
