= Sun Qingyun =

Chinese politician

- 孙清云

Vice-Chairman of Shaanxi Provincial Committee of the Chinese People's Political Consultative Conference
- In office January 2015 – November 2015
- Leader: Ma Zhongping (chairman)

Deputy Party Secretary of Shaanxi
- In office May 2012 – March 2015
- Preceded by: Wang Xia
- Succeeded by: Hu Heping

Party Secretary of Xi'an
- In office July 2006 – June 2012
- Preceded by: Yuan Chunqing
- Succeeded by: Wei Minzhou

Mayor of Xi'an
- In office April 2002 – July 2006
- Preceded by: Feng Xuchu
- Succeeded by: Chen Baogen

Personal details
- Born: October 1954 (age 71–72) Ling County, Shandong, China
- Party: Chinese Communist Party
- Education: Harbin Normal University

Sun Qingyun (simplified Chinese: 孙清云; traditional Chinese: 孫清雲; pinyin: Sūn Qīngyún; born October 1954) is a Chinese former politician who spent most of his career in northwest China's Shaanxi province. He has been stripped of his post in November 2015. Through his career he has served as vice-chairman of Shaanxi Provincial Committee of the Chinese People's Political Consultative Conference, the Deputy Communist Party Secretary of Shaanxi, and the Party Secretary of Xi'an.

== Biography ==
Sun was born in Ling County, Shandong, in October 1954. At the age of 15, he joined the People's Liberation Army. After military service, he worked in China Youth Daily as an editor and journalist. He entered politics in December 1969, and joined the Chinese Communist Party in November 1971. Then he worked in General Office of the CCP Heilongjiang Provincial Committee and CCP Shandong Provincial Committee respectively.

He was a secretary in the General Office of the State Council of the People's Republic of China between October 1994 to December 1998. Than he was transferred to Xi'an, capital of northwest China's Shaanxi province, by age 44. He served as vice-mayor of Xi'an in December 1998, and held that office until October 2000, when he was promoted to become deputy party boss. He was deputy party boss, mayor and secretary of the party leadership group of Xi'an from January 2002 to July 2006. In July 2006 he was promoted again to become party boss, the top political position in the city and at vice-ministerial level, he held that position until June 2012. He rose to become deputy party boss of Shaanxi in May 2012, and concurrently served as vice-chairman of Shaanxi Provincial Committee of the Chinese People's Political Consultative Conference in January 2015.

Sun was a delegate to the 17th and 18th National Congress of the Chinese Communist Party and a delegate to the 10th and 12th National People's Congress.

=== Downfall ===
At the beginning of September, 2015, Sun was taken away when his plane landed in Beijing for a conference. In November he was removed from his post by the CCP Shaanxi Provincial Committee and was placed on two-year probation within the Party, having held the consultative position for only nine months; he was demoted to a chuji "non-leading position". Three Shaanxi businessmen, President of Xi'an Aibo Group Zhao Jingbo (赵静波; He is also Sun's relative), President of Shaanxi Horeal Group Co., Ltd. Wang Shichun (王世春) and President of Shaanxi Jinshida Real Estate Co., Ltd Bai Haining (白海宁), who had close relations with Sun Qingyun, were detained by the Communist Party's anti-corruption agency.

Government offices
Preceded by Feng Xuchu (冯煦初)	Mayor of Xi'an; 2002–2006	Succeeded by Chen Baogen (陈宝根)
Party political offices
Preceded by Yuan Chunqing	Party Secretary of Xi'an; 2006–2012	Succeeded by Wei Minzhou
Preceded by Wang Xia	Deputy Party Secretary of Shaanxi; 2012–2015	Succeeded by Hu Heping
Assembly seats
Preceded by Yuan Chunqing	Chairman of the Standing Committee of Xi'an Municipal People's Congress; 2007–2012	Succeeded by Chen Baogen
