= Cai Dafeng =

Chinese politician (born 1960)

- 蔡达峰
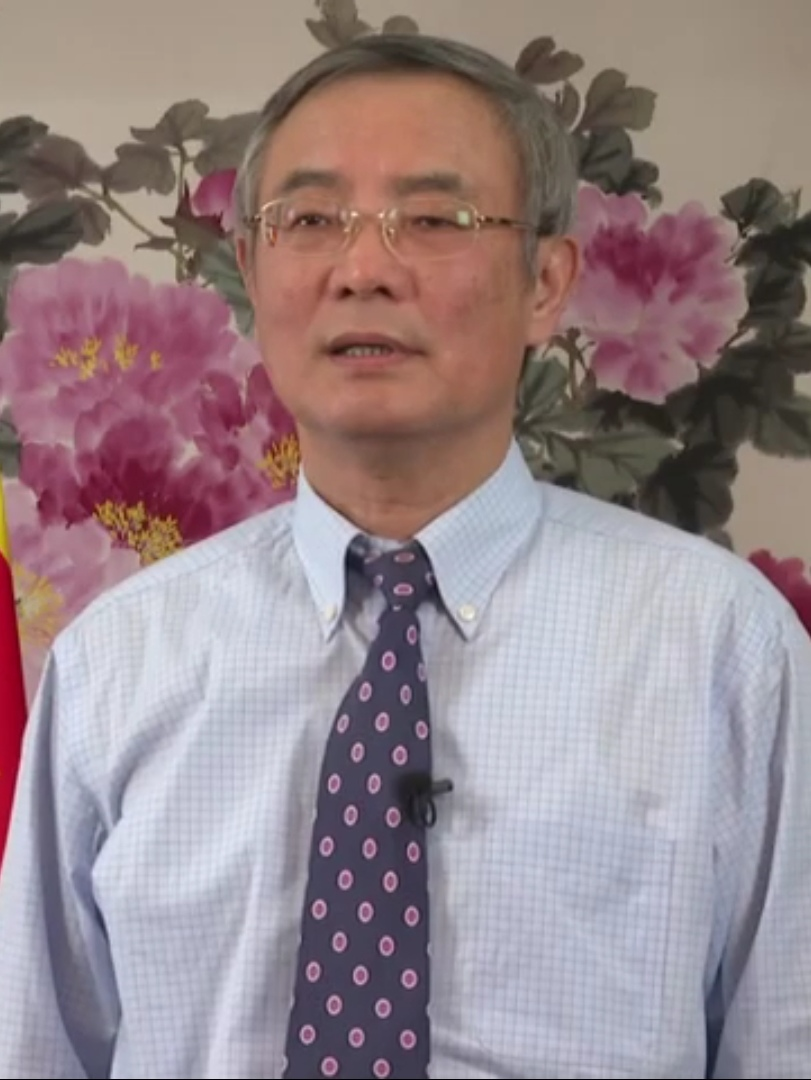

Vice Chairman of the Standing Committee of the National People's Congress
- Incumbent
- Assumed office 17 March 2018
- Chairman: Li Zhanshu; Zhao Leji

Chairman of the China Association for Promoting Democracy
- Incumbent
- Assumed office 6 December 2017
- Preceded by: Yan Junqi

Personal details
- Born: 1960 (age 65–66) Shanghai, China
- Party: China Association for Promoting Democracy
- Education: Tongji University

Cai Dafeng (Chinese: 蔡达峰; pinyin: Cài Dáfēng; born 1960) is a Chinese politician and architect currently serving as chairperson of the Central Committee of the China Association for Promoting Democracy (2017–present) and Vice Chairperson of the 13th National People's Congress Standing Committee (2018–present).

== Life and career ==
Cai was born in Shanghai in 1960. From 1978 to 1985 he was educated at Tongji University, majoring in architecture, where he graduated in 1985 and obtained a master's degree. In the same year he became a cadre in Shanghai Museum. In February 1987, he studied for a doctorate degree in architecture at Tongji University. In October 1990, he served as a lecturer in the Department of Architecture of Tongji University. In September 1993, he served successively as associate professor, professor, associate dean and dean of the Department of Culture and Museology of Fudan University. He joined the China Association for Promoting Democracy in February 1995. In July 1999, he served as Director of the Academic Affairs Office of Fudan University. Since March 2003, he has served as Vice President of Fudan University. In January 2008, he served as deputy director of the Standing Committee of the Shanghai Municipal People's Congress. In April 2016, he served as the Vice President of Tongji University. In December 2016, he served as executive vice chairman of the Central Committee of China Association for Promoting Democracy.

On December 6, 2017, Cai was elected as the chairman of the Central Committee of the China Association for Promoting Democracy. On March 17, 2018, he was elected as a Vice Chairman of the 13th National People's Congress.

On 7 December 2020, pursuant to Executive Order 13936, the US Department of the Treasury imposed sanctions on all 14 Vice Chairpersons of the National People's Congress, including Cai, for "undermining Hong Kong's autonomy and restricting the freedom of expression or assembly."

On March 10, 2023, during the 14th National People's Congress, he was appointed Vice Chairman of the Standing Committee of the National People's Congress.
