= Wang Yongkang =

Chinese engineer and politician

Wang Yongkang (Chinese: 王永康; born November 1963) is a Chinese engineer and politician, serving since February 2019 as the Standing Committee member of the CPC Heilongjiang Committee. A doctorate in materials science with a background in China's military manufacturing industry, Wang entered politics in 2001 in the city of Ningbo, working his way up the administrative ladder. He served as the mayor of Yuyao and the mayor and party chief of Lishui, Zhejiang, before being anointed to the Zhejiang provincial party standing committee in 2016. Later he served as the Communist Party Secretary of Xi'an from December 2016 to February 2019.

== Biography ==
Wang was born in Wuhan. He joined the Communist Party in July 1984. He graduated from the Wuhan University of Technology in 1985 with a degree in mechanical engineering. In 1991 he obtained a master's degree in metalwork from the Harbin Institute of Technology. In January 1991, he joined a military contractor China Bingqi (later to become Norinco) as a member of its Ningbo office, rising through its ranks to take on progressively more advanced administrative roles. In September 1996 he was named head of the Science and Technology Association of Ningbo.

In January 1998, he was promoted to deputy director of the Ningbo research institute, rising to director shortly thereafter. He was awarded a doctorate from the Harbin Institute of Technology in July 2001 in materials science. In October 2001, he entered government, serving as deputy secretary-general of the municipal government, the head of the Ningbo Technology District. Then in August 2004, he was elevated to mayor of Yuyao, then promoted to party chief in March 2006. In June 2009, he was named guazhi party chief of Nanchuan District in Chongqing. In 2011, he was named mayor of Lishui, and head of the Lishui Ecological Industry Cluster (丽水生态产业集聚区). In March 2013, he was named party chief of Lishui. In January 2016, he became head of the United Front Department of the Zhejiang Communist Party organization and a member of the provincial party standing committee.

In December 2016, Wang was named Communist Party Secretary of Xi'an and a member of the Shaanxi party standing committee.

In February 2019, Wang was appointed as the Standing Committee member of the CPC Heilongjiang Committee. Later he was appointed as the vice Governor of Heilongjiang.

He is a delegate to the 12th National People's Congress.

Party political offices
Preceded by Wei Minzhou	Party Secretary of Xi'an; 2016– 2019	Succeeded by Wang Hao
