= China Association for Promoting Democracy =

Minor political party in China

China Association for Promoting Democracy 中国民主促进会
- Chairperson: Cai Dafeng
- Founded: 30 December 1945; 80 years ago
- Headquarters: Beijing
- Newspaper: Democracy Monthly
- Membership (2024): 200,000
- Ideology: Socialism with Chinese characteristics
- National People's Congress (14th): 54 / 2,977
- NPC Standing Committee (14th): 7 / 175
- CPPCC National Committee (14th): 45 / 544 (Seats for political parties)

Website
- www.mj.org.cn

China Association for Promoting Democracy

Chinese name
- Simplified Chinese: 中国民主促进会
- Traditional Chinese: 中國民主促進會
Transcriptions
Standard Mandarin
- Hanyu Pinyin: Zhōngguó Mínzhǔ Cùjìnhuì

Abbreviation
- Simplified Chinese: 民进
- Traditional Chinese: 民進
Transcriptions
Standard Mandarin
- Hanyu Pinyin: Mínjìn

Tibetan name
- Tibetan: ཀྲུང་གོ་དམངས་གཙོ་ཡར་སྐུལ་ལྷན་ཚོགས
Transcriptions
- Wylie: krung go dmangs gtso yar skul lhan tshogs

Zhuang name
- Zhuang: Cunghgoz Minzcuj Coicaenh Hoih

Mongolian name
- Mongolian Cyrillic: Дундад улсын ардчилал ийнор ахиулах эвлэл
- Mongolian script: ᠳᠤᠮᠳᠠᠳᠤ; ᠤᠯᠤᠰ ᠤᠨ; ᠠᠷᠠᠳᠴᠢᠯᠠᠯ; ᠡᠶᠢᠨᠣᠷ ᠠᠬᠢᠭᠤᠯᠬᠤ; ᠡᠪᠯᠡᠯ

Uyghur name
- Uyghur: جۇڭگو دېموكراتىيىنى ئىلگىرى سۈرۈش جەمئىيىتى
Transcriptions
- Latin Yëziqi: Junggo démokratiyini ilgiri sürüsh jemiyiti
- Yengi Yeziⱪ: Junggo démokratiyini ilgiri sürüsh jemiyiti

Manchu name
- Manchu script: ᠮᡳᠨᠵᡳᠨ
- Romanization: Minjin

The China Association for Promoting Democracy (CAPD, commonly known in Chinese as Minjin) is one of the eight minor non-oppositional political parties, officially termed "democratic parties," in the People's Republic of China led by the Chinese Communist Party. CAPD is a political party of a united-front nature, composed mainly of middle- and senior-level intellectuals engaged in education, culture, publishing, media, and related fields of science and technology.

It was formed on 30 December 1945, and mainly represents high-level intellectuals engaged in education and cultural publishing media. The CAPD is the fourth-ranking minor party in China. It currently has 58 seats in the National People's Congress, 7 seats in the NPC Standing Committee and 45 seats in the Chinese People's Political Consultative Conference. Its current chairman is Cai Dafeng.

== History ==
The China Association for Promoting Democracy (Minjin) was founded by progressive intellectuals from the cultural, educational, and publishing sectors, as well as figures from the business community who had remained in Shanghai during the Second Sino-Japanese War. Its principal founders included Ma Xulun, Wang Shao'ao, Zhou Jianren, Xu Guangping, Lin Handong, Xu Boxin, Zhao Puchu, Lei Jieqiong, Zheng Zhenduo, and Ke Ling. During the war, they worked alongside members of the Chinese Communist Party in sustained efforts to resist Japanese aggression and save the nation.

After the end of the Second Sino-Japanese War, these figures actively participated in movements opposing the ruling Kuomintang. On 30 December 1945, they formally established a political organization in Shanghai dedicated to "promoting the spirit of democracy and advancing the practice of democratic politics in China," which was named the China Association for Promoting Democracy. Following its founding, Minjin issued a series of important political statements, including the Declaration on the Current Situation, calling for an immediate end to one-party dictatorship, the restoration of political power to the people, the cessation of civil war, and the protection of citizens' freedoms and rights.

In order to expand the forces supporting peace and democracy, Minjin coordinated and united 68 major mass organizations in Shanghai to form the Shanghai Federation of People's Organizations. On 23 June 1946, Minjin participated in initiating and organizing a mass rally of more than 100,000 people at Shanghai North Railway Station to protest against civil war. Minjin leaders such as Ma Xulun and Lei Jieqiong also joined a peace petition delegation to Nanjing. During the "Xiaguan Incident" on 23 June 1946, they faced attacks by Kuomintang assailants, injuring many.

On 30 April 1948, the Central Committee of the Chinese Communist Party issued the "May Day Slogans," calling upon all democratic parties, people's organizations, and prominent individuals to convene a political consultative conference, prepare for the convening of a people’s congress, and establish a democratic coalition government. Minjin firmly supported and responded to this call. Its main leaders successively moved from Shanghai and Hong Kong to the communist-held areas, where they participated in preparations for the new Political Consultative Conference. In September 1949, Minjin representatives—including Ma Xulun, Xu Guangping, Zhou Jianren, Wang Shao'ao, and Lei Jieqiong—attended the First plenary session of the Chinese People's Political Consultative Conference and took part in drafting the Common Program, making important contributions to the founding of the People's Republic of China.

== Organization ==
According to its constitution, the CAPD is officially committed to socialism with Chinese characteristics and upholding the leadership of the CCP. The CAPD is the fourth-ranking minor democratic party in China. The party is a member of the Chinese People's Political Consultative Conference.

The highest body of the CAPD officially is the National Congress, which is held every five years. The 13th National Congress, held in December 2022, was the most recently held Party Congress. The National Congress elects the Central Committee of the CAPD. At the end of 2024, the party had 29 province-level, 274 prefecture-level city, 54 county-level and 9,442 grassroot level organizations. The CAPD publishes a newspaper titled Democracy Monthly (民主).

=== Composition ===
The party mainly represents high-level intellectuals engaged in education and cultural publishing media. At the end of 2024, the CAPD had more than 200,000 members, of which 71.4 were middle- and high-level intellectuals in the fields of education, culture, publishing, media, and science and technology.

=== Chairpersons ===
No.	Chairperson	Took office	Left office	Ref.
1	Ma Xulun 马叙伦	April 1950	July 1966	
2	Zhou Jianren 周培源	October 1979	July 1984	
3	Ye Shengtao 叶圣陶	December 1984	June 1987	
4	Lei Jieqiong 雷洁琼	June 1987	2 December 1997	
5	Xu Jialu 许嘉璐	December 1997	December 2007	
6	Yan Junqi 严隽琪	December 2007	December 2017	
7	Cai Dafeng 蔡达峰	6 December 2017	Incumbent	

=== National People's Congress elections ===
Election year	Number of seats
2017–18	55 / 2,970
2022–23	54 / 2,977
