= Fang Hongwei =

Chinese politician

- 方红卫

Party Secretary of Xi'an
- In office November 7, 2021 – November 7, 2025
- Deputy: Li Mingyuan; Ye Niuping (Mayor)
- Preceded by: Wang Hao
- Succeeded by: Hao Huijie

Secretary-General of Shaanxi Provincial Party Committee
- In office May 27, 2021 – November 7, 2021
- Party Secretary: Liu Guozhong
- Preceded by: Lu Jianjun
- Succeeded by: Li Chunlin

Party Secretary of Hanzhong
- In office July 16, 2020 – June 23, 2021
- Deputy: Zhong Hongjiang (Mayor)
- Preceded by: Wang Jianjun
- Succeeded by: Zhong Hongjiang

Mayor of Hanzhong
- In office February 9, 2017 – January 18, 2021
- Party Secretary: Wang Jianjun
- Preceded by: Wang Jianjun
- Succeeded by: Zhong Hongjiang

Personal details
- Born: June 1966 (age 60) Fuping, Weinan, Shaanxi, China
- Party: Chinese Communist Party (1987-2026, expelled)
- Education: Tsinghua University (BA); Northwestern Polytechnical University (MA); Chang'an University (PhD)

Fang Hongwei (Chinese: 方红卫; born June 1966) was a Chinese politician and entrepreneur from Fuping, Shaanxi. He graduated from the Department of Automotive Engineering at Tsinghua University. He previously served as Chairman of Shaanxi Automobile Group, Chinese Communist Party Deputy Committee Secretary, Mayor, and Party Secretary of Hanzhong, Party Secretary of Shaanxi, and Party Secretary of Xi'an.

In November 2025, Fang was placed under disciplinary review and investigation for serious violations of discipline and law.

== Biography ==
Fang graduated in 1989 from the Department of Automotive Engineering at Tsinghua University, majoring in Automobile Engineering. After graduation, he joined Shaanxi Automobile Group, where he served successively as General Manager (2002), Chairman (2008), and Chairman of Shaanxi Automobile Holding Group (2012).

In April 2015, he was transferred to Baoji, serving as Vice Mayor and Member of the Standing Committee of the CCP Baoji Municipal Committee.

In July 2016, he was transferred to Executive Vice Mayor of Weinan and Member of the Standing Committee of the CCP Weinan Municipal Committee.

In January 2017, Fang was appointed Deputy Secretary of the CCP Hanzhong Municipal Committee and Party Secretary of the Municipal Government Leadership Group; the following month, he was elected Mayor of Hanzhong.

In February 2018, he was elected a Deputy to the 13th National People's Congress He became Secretary of the CCP Hanzhong Municipal Committee in July 2020.

In May 2021, he was promoted to Member of the Standing Committee and appointed as the Secretary-General of the CCP Shaanxi Provincial Committee.

In November 2021, he was appointed as Secretary of the CCP Xi'an Municipal Committee.

== Downfall ==
On November 7, 2025, the website of the Central Commission for Discipline Inspection (CCDI) of CCP and the National Supervisory Commission announced that Fang Hongwei was under investigation for serious violations of discipline and law. Fang was expelled from the party and dismissed from the public office on July 7, 2026. On 29 October 2026, the fifth plenary session of the 20th CCP Central Committee reviewed and approved the report of the CCDI on the "serious violations of discipline and law" by Fang and confirmed the Politburo decision to expel him from the CCP.

Business positions
Preceded by Zhang Yupu	Chairman of Shaanxi Automobile Group; 2008–2015	Succeeded by Yuan Hongming
Government offices
Preceded by Wang Jianjun	Mayor of Hanzhong; 2017–2021	Succeeded by Zhong Hongjiang
Party political offices
Preceded by Wang Jianjun	Communist Party Secretary of Hanzhong; 2017–2021	Succeeded by Zhong Hongjiang
Preceded by Lu Jianjun	Secretary-General of Shaanxi Provincial Committee of the Chinese Communist Party; 2021	Succeeded by Li Chunlin
Preceded by Wang Hao	Party Secretary of Xi'an; 2021–2025	Succeeded by Hao Huijie
