= Li Peicheng =

Chinese engineer (1935–2024)

- 李佩成
- Born: 30 January 1935; Qian County, Shaanxi, China
- Died: 23 February 2024 (aged 89); Xi'an, Shaanxi, China
- Education: Northwest A&F University; Russian State Geological Prospecting University
- Scientific career
- Fields: Agricultural Soil and Water Engineering; Water Resources and Environment
- Workplaces: Department of Water Resources, Shaanxi University of Technology (1966–1972); Department of Water Resources, Northwestern Agricultural University (1972–1992); Xi'an Institute of Geology (1992–2000); Chang'an University (2000–2023)

Li Peicheng (Chinese: 李佩成; pinyin: Lǐ Pèichéng; 30 January 1935 – 23 February 2024) was a Chinese agricultural soil and water engineering and water resources and environmental engineer, and an academician of the Chinese Academy of Engineering.

== Biography ==
Li was born in Qian County, Shaanxi, on 30 January 1935. In 1952, he enrolled at Northwest Agricultural College (now Northwest A&F University), where he majored in hydraulics. He joined the Chinese Communist Party (CCP) in March 1956.

After graduation, he stayed teaching for a year. In August 1957, he joined the faculty of Xi'an Jiaotong University, but after teaching for only a year, in September 1958, he became a student at the Preparatory Department for Studying in the Soviet Union, Beijing Foreign Studies University. In June 1960, he was a secretary for the Department of Water Resources, Shaanxi University of Technology, and two years later, he studied agricultural irrigation at the Chinese Academy of Agricultural Sciences. In September 1963, he pursued advanced studies in the Soviet Union, earning his vice-doctorate degree in hydrogeological engineering 1966. He returned to China in 1966 and continued to teach at the Department of Water Resources, Shaanxi University of Technology. In July 1972, he was appointed vice president of the university, and held that office until August 1992. He also served as director of the Agricultural Research and Training Center for Arid and Semi arid Regions since August 1985. He was a visiting scholar at the St. Petersburg State Polytechnical University between August 1988 and February 1989. In August 1992, he was recruited as dean and professor of the Survey Institute of Xi'an Institute of Engineering (formerly Xi'an Institute of Geology), and served until April 2000, when he was hired as professor and doctoral supervisor at the School of Environmental Science and Engineering, Chang'an University.

On 23 February 2024, he died in Xi'an, Shaanxi, at the age of 89.

== Honours and awards ==
- 1978 State Science and Technology Progress Award (First Class) for Positioning Experiment for Comprehensive Governance of Loess Plateau - Construction of Zaozigou Pilot Zone
- 1986 State Technological Invention Award (Fourth Class) for the dual purpose light well for drainage and irrigation
- 2003 Member of the Chinese Academy of Engineering (CAE)
