= Ye Niuping =

Chinese politician

Ye Niuping 叶牛平 葉牛平
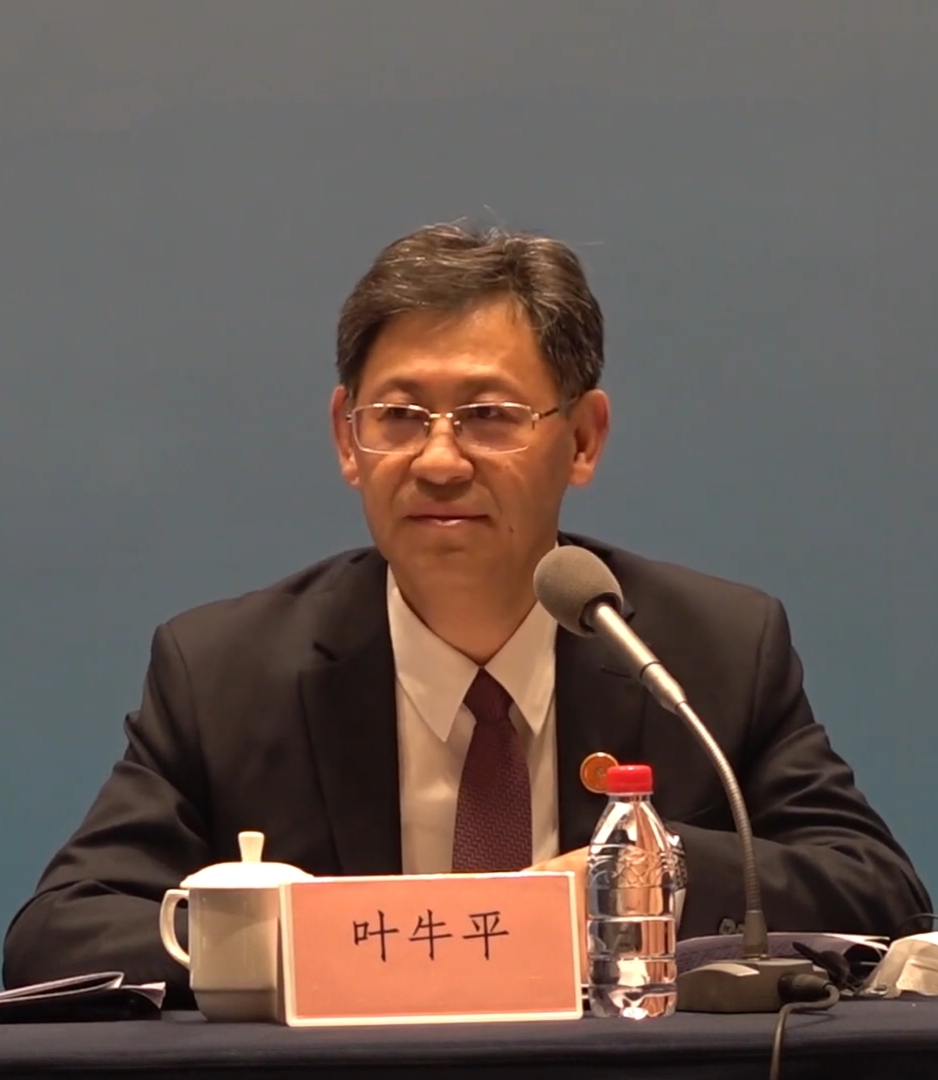
- Ye in 2023

Mayor of Xi'an
- Incumbent
- Assumed office April 4, 2023
- Party Secretary: Fang Hongwei; Hao Huijie
- Preceded by: Li Mingyuan

Vice Governor of Shaanxi
- In office July 28, 2022 – May 31, 2023
- Governor: Zhao Yide; Zhao Gang

Party Secretary of Jieyang
- In office May 8, 2019 – May 30, 2020
- Deputy: Zhang Ke (Mayor)
- Preceded by: Li Shuihua
- Succeeded by: Cai Chaolin

Mayor of Jieyang
- In office December 19, 2017 – August 1, 2019
- Party Secretary: Li Shuihua
- Preceded by: Chen Dong
- Succeeded by: Zhang Ke

Personal details
- Born: December 1967 (age 58) Taihu County, Anqing, Anhui, China
- Party: Chinese Communist Party
- Website: Mayor of Xi'an

Ye Niuping (simplified Chinese: 叶牛平; traditional Chinese: 葉牛平; born December 1967) is a Chinese politician who has been serving as Deputy Secretary of the Communist Party and Mayor of Xi'an since 2023. He previously served as Vice Governor of Shaanxi Province and Secretary-General of the Guangdong Provincial People's Government, as well as various positions in Guangdong Province.

== Early life and education ==
Ye was born in Taihu County, Anqing, Anhui Province, in December 1967. From 1985 to 1989, he studied in the Department of History at Anhui University, majoring in secretarial and archival science. Between 1989 and 1992, he pursued a master's degree in modern Chinese history at Sun Yat-sen University.

== Career ==
=== Guangdong Province ===
In 1992, Ye joined the Logistics Department of the Guangzhou Military Region, where he worked as a political officer in the Construction Battalion. In June 1993, he became a member of the Chinese Communist Party (CCP). From 1993 to 1994, he served as Director of the Office of the Shenzhen 976 Construction Command under the same department. Between 1994 and 1999, he successively held the positions of Director, deputy director, and Director of the Real Estate Development Department of the Construction Battalion of the Guangzhou Military Region Logistics Department. From 1999 to 2003, he served as Deputy General Manager and then General Manager of the Guangdong Zhongnan Construction and Property Development Corporation.

From 2003 to 2006, Ye held several positions in the Guangzhou University Town Construction Command, including Director of the General Affairs Department, Director of the Planning and Finance Department, and deputy director of the Office. In April 2006, he became Deputy Party Secretary and Acting Mayor of Zengcheng, a county-level city under Guangzhou. In November of the same year, he was elected Mayor of Zengcheng. In 2010, he concurrently served as Deputy Party Secretary and deputy director of the Administrative Committee of Zengcheng Economic and Technological Development Zone.

In October 2012, Ye was appointed Deputy Party Secretary of Baiyun District, Guangzhou, and in November of the same year became Acting District Mayor. He also concurrently served as deputy director of the Administrative Committee of Guangzhou Airport Economic Zone and Guangzhou Baiyun Airport Comprehensive Bonded Zone. In January 2013, he was officially elected District Mayor.

In September 2015, he was appointed Director and Party Secretary of the Guangzhou Development and Reform Commission. In December 2016, he became Party Secretary of the General Office of the Guangzhou Municipal People's Government, and in January 2017, Secretary-General and Director of the General Office of the Guangzhou Municipal Government. In July 2017, he was appointed Vice Mayor of Guangzhou.

In December 2017, Ye was appointed Deputy Party Secretary of Jieyang and was elected Mayor later that month. In February 2018, he was elected as a delegate to the 13th National People's Congress. In May 2019, he was promoted to Secretary of the Jieyang Municipal Party Committee, and in August 2019, he concurrently served as Chairman of the Standing Committee of the Jieyang Municipal People's Congress.

In June 2020, Ye was appointed Secretary-General and Director of the General Office of the Guangdong Provincial People's Government.

=== Shaanxi Province ===
In July 2022, Ye was transferred to Shaanxi Province and appointed Vice Governor and member of the Provincial Government's Party Leadership Group. In April 2023, he was appointed Deputy Party Secretary of Xi'an and Acting Mayor of Xi'an. In May 2023, he resigned from the post of Vice Governor of Shaanxi Province, and in June 2023, he was officially elected Mayor of Xi'an.

Preceded by Li Mingyuan	Mayor of Xi'an; 2023–present	Incumbent
Preceded by Liu Xiaotao	Secretary-General of the Guangdong Provincial People's Government; 2020–2022	Succeeded by Chen Min
Preceded by Chen Dong	Mayor of Jieyang; 2017–2019	Succeeded by Zhang Ke
Preceded by Li Shuihua	Communist Party Secretary of Jieyang; 2019–2020	Succeeded by Cai Chaolin
