= Yan Junqi =

Chinese politician

- 严隽琪
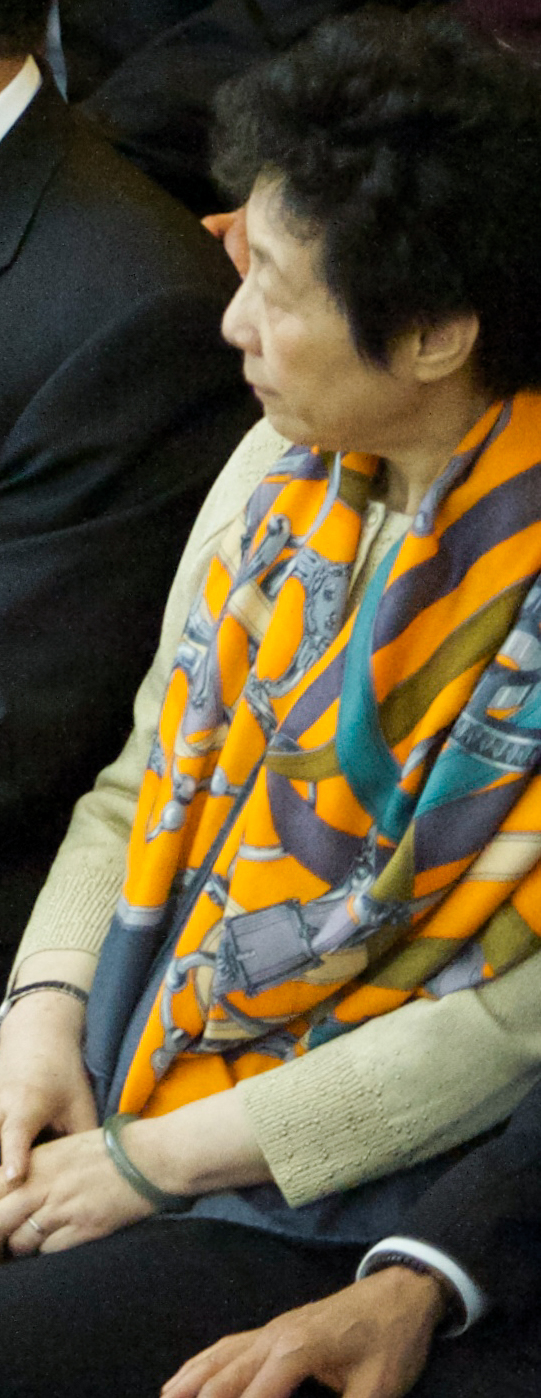

Vice Chairwoman of the Standing Committee of the National People's Congress
- In office 14 March 2013 – 17 March 2018
- Chairman: Zhang Dejiang

Chairwoman of the China Association for Promoting Democracy
- In office December 2007 – 6 December 2017
- Preceded by: Xu Jialu
- Succeeded by: Cai Dafeng

Personal details
- Born: August 1946 (age 80) Wu County, Jiangsu
- Party: China Association for Promoting Democracy
- Children: 4
- Education: Shanghai Jiao Tong University

Yan Junqi (Chinese: 严隽琪; born August 1946) is a retired Chinese politician who was a vice chairwoman of the standing committee of the National People's Congress, and the chairwoman of the China Association for Promoting Democracy.

== Biography ==
Yan was born in Wu County, Jiangsu Province (a present-day urban district of Suzhou), and graduated from the department of mechanical engineering at Shanghai Jiao Tong University. Her father died when she was six, and along with her other 4 siblings, she was raised by her mother in harsh conditions. After graduating from SJTU in August 1968, Yan was sent to work in Woniu Coal Mine in Xuzhou. After the Cultural Revolution, Yan was enrolled again in the department of mechanic engineering of SJTU in 1978 and obtained her master's degree in 1981. She then became a teacher at the university. Before long, Yan was sent to study in Denmark, and obtained her doctorate in the department of naval engineering of the school of mechanics at the Technical University of Denmark in 1986.

Since returning to China, Yan had been teaching and doing research at SJTU and was elevated to become a member of a 7-person expert group of the "863 plan". She served as dean of the school of mechanical and power engineering and president assistant of SJTU. In 2000, Yan entered the government and became the vice director of the information office of the Shanghai municipal government. She was also elected vice chairwoman of the Shanghai committee of the China Association for Promoting Democracy. In 2001, Yan was appointed as vice mayor of Shanghai, responsible for science and technology, education and women and children's affairs. In June 2002, she was elected the chairwoman of the Shanghai committee of the China Association for Promoting Democracy. In December of the same year, Yan was elected vice chairwoman of the central committee of the China Association for Promoting Democracy in the first plenary session of the 9th national congress of CAPD.

On February 27, 2007, Yan resigned from the position of vice mayor of Shanghai. In April, she resigned as chairwoman of the CAPD Shanghai committee. In July 2007, she was transferred to Beijing and became the vice executive chairwoman of the central committee of the China Association for Promoting Democracy. Such a series of arrangements indicated Yan would soon take charge of the Association. Indeed, on December 7, 2007, in the first plenary session of the 10th national congress of CAPD, Yan was elected the chairwoman of the China Association for Promoting Democracy.

== Family ==
The former president of the Republic of China, Yen Chia-kan, was Yan's family uncle, was also from Wuxian, Jiangsu ancestrally.
