= Yuan Chunqing =

Chinese politician

- 袁纯清

Party Secretary of Shanxi
- In office May 31, 2010 – September 1, 2014
- Preceded by: Zhang Baoshun
- Succeeded by: Wang Rulin

Governor of Shaanxi
- In office June 1, 2006 – June 2, 2010
- Preceded by: Chen Deming
- Succeeded by: Zhao Zhengyong

Party Secretary of Xi'an
- In office January 13, 2004 – July 16, 2006
- Preceded by: Li Zhanshu
- Succeeded by: Sun Qingyun

Secretary General of the Central Commission for Discipline Inspection
- In office October 1997 – March 2001
- Preceded by: Wang Guang
- Succeeded by: Wu Dingfu

Personal details
- Born: March 1952 (age 74) Hanshou County, Hunan
- Party: Chinese Communist Party

Yuan Chunqing (simplified Chinese: 袁纯清; traditional Chinese: 袁純清; pinyin: Yuán Chúnqīng; born March 1952) is a retired Chinese politician. He was deputy chief of the Office for Rural Work and the Party Secretary of Shanxi. Prior to that, he was Governor of neighbouring Shaanxi province.

== Biography ==
Yuan was born in Hanshou County, Hunan Province. He graduated from the department of law of Peking University, and obtained a master's degree in law from the China University of Political Science and Law in 1990, as well as a doctoral degree in management from the international business school of Hunan University. Yuan joined the central organization of the Communist Youth League (CYL) shortly after graduating from Peking University. He worked there for 17 years. In October 1997, Yuan was named a standing committee member of the Central Commission for Discipline Inspection, taking up his first major role outside of the CYL. At the CCDI he became widely known for announcing the results of the investigation into the "Yuanhua scandal" in Xiamen involving tycoon Lai Changxing.

In 2001 he was transferred to work in Shaanxi province as deputy party chief. Beginning in January 2004 he was named party chief of Xi'an. While in Xi'an Yuan was known to have released a white paper about the city's development, and became one of the "most watched municipal party chiefs in the country." In 2006, he succeeded Chen Deming as the Governor of Shaanxi. He seemed destined for even higher office. On May 31, 2010, Yuan was named party chief of the coal-producing neighboring province of Shanxi. Yuan was abruptly transferred out of office as party chief of Shanxi in September 2014 during the "great Shanxi political earthquake". He was then named one of the deputy chiefs of the Office for Rural Work, presumably maintaining his full provincial rank until October 2017.

He has been an alternate member of the 16th Central Committee of the Chinese Communist Party and a full member of the 17th and 18th Central Committees.

== Works ==
- An Overview of Reform and Development in China and Overseas
- The Transformation of Small-scale Economics in China
- Symbiosis Theory: Comments on Small-scale Economics
- Financial Symbiosis Theory and Reform of City Commercial Banks

Political offices
Preceded by Chen Deming	Governor of Shaanxi; 2006–2010	Succeeded by Zhao Zhengyong
Party political offices
Preceded by Zhang Baoshun	Party Secretary of Shanxi; 2010–2014	Succeeded by Wang Rulin
Preceded by Li Zhanshu	Party Secretary of Xi'an; 2004–2006	Succeeded by Sun Qingyun
