= Wei Minzhou =

Chinese politician

- 魏民洲

Party Secretary of Xi'an
- In office 2012–2016
- Preceded by: Sun Qingyun
- Succeeded by: Wang Yongkang

Personal details
- Born: August 1956 (age 70) Huayin, Shaanxi
- Party: Chinese Communist Party (expelled)
- Education: Xi'an University of Technology

Wei Minzhou (Chinese: 魏民洲; pinyin: Wèi Mínzhōu; born August 24, 1956) is a Chinese politician who served as Chinese Communist Party Committee Secretary of Xi'an between 2012 and 2016.

In 2017, Wei was placed under investigation by the Central Commission for Discipline Inspection and expelled from the party. In November 2018, Wei was sentenced to life in prison for taking more than 100 million yuan in bribes. Wei's associate Zhao Zhengyong was also sentenced to life in prison (sentenced to death with a two-year reprieve).

== Biography ==
Wei was born in Huayin, Shaanxi, but traces his lineage to nearby Pucheng County. He performed rural labour during the Cultural Revolution and was a leader in his local commune. In 1978, after the resumption of the National College Entrance Exam, Wei entered Shaanxi Mechanics College (now Xi'an University of Technology) and majored in mechanical design, then was assigned to work in Zhengzhou. In 1982 he became one of the leaders of the Communist Youth League organization at the factory he worked at, beginning his political career.

Between 1983 and 1998, Wei served in the Youth League system. He worked in Henan, then was transferred back to his native Shaanxi province. He served as the general manager of the Shaanxi Youth Travel Agency, then head of the office for Project Hope and its partner-organization Shaanxi Youth Development Foundation. In 1996, he was named deputy chief of the provincial Youth League organization.

In 1998, Wei was named the Chinese Communist Party Deputy Committee Secretary of Shangluo, which was converted from a prefecture to a city in 1998. Wei was named mayor of the newly formed city. In 2005, he became party chief. In 2007, he was named a member of the provincial Party Standing Committee, and in December became the secretary-general of the Shaanxi party committee.

In June 2012, he was named CCP Committee Secretary of Xi'an. He left the post in December 2016, after reaching the retirement age of 60. Then he was appointed as vice-chairman of the Shaanxi People's Congress.

== Investigation ==
On May 22, 2017, Wei was suspected of "serious violations of discipline" and placed under investigation by the Central Commission for Discipline Inspection (CCDI). The party investigation into Wei concluded in August 2017. In its disciplinary dossier against Wei, the CCDI stated that Wei had "severely violated political discipline and political rules, engaged in political opportunism and careerism; exhibited bad political morality; long engaged in superstitious activities; resisted the investigation into his wrongdoing." It also said he violated the Eight-point Regulation, frequented private clubs and accepted banquet invitations funded by public sources, and accepted "tourism activities arranged by private enterprises." He was also said to have violated organizational discipline, life discipline, took bribes, and used his position of power to secure gain for others. He was summarily expelled from the Communist Party and his case forwarded to judicial authorities for prosecution. Wei's close ally, Zhao Zhengyong, former governor and party chief of Shaanxi, was under investigation in January 2019. Zhao was later sentenced to death with a two-year reprieve.

== Sentence ==
On November 20, 2018, Wei was sentenced to life in prison for taking bribes worth 109.78 million yuan ($15.8 million) by the Intermediate People's Court in Chenzhou.

Party political offices
| Preceded by Sun Qingyun | Party Secretary of Xi'an; 2012–2016 | Succeeded by Wang Yongkang |
