= Wang Xiao (politician) =

Chinese politician

Wang Xiao (Chinese: 王晓; born May 1968) is a Chinese politician, serving since 2015 as the Communist Party Secretary of Xining, the capital of Qinghai province.

Wang was born in 1968 in Zaozhuang, Shandong. He graduated from the University of Science and Technology of China. In his early career he worked in the Qingdao Hi-tech Industrial Zone. In 1995 he joined the Communist Youth League system, where he took on increasingly senior posts, including CYL chief of Qingdao, CYL deputy chief of Shandong province, and leader of the Youth Work Department of the Central Committee of the Communist Youth League. He was later named a Secretary of the Secretariat of the Communist Youth League, then Executive Secretary.

In 2013, he left the Youth League system to take on the post of Vice-Governor in Qinghai. He was also named a member of the Provincial Party Standing Committee.

Party political offices
Previous: Wang Jianjun	Communist Party Secretary of Xining; 2015–present	Incumbent
