= Socialism or Capitalism =

Socialism or Capitalism (Chinese: 姓社姓资; pinyin: Xìng shè xìng zī) was a political debate in China instigated by the left-wing (also known as the conservative wing) of the Chinese Communist Party in 1990, which aimed to influence the direction of reform and opening up. It ended with Deng Xiaoping's southern tour and the establishment of the socialist market economy system.

== History ==
On 22 February 1990, the People's Daily published a long article by Wang Renzhi, the Head of the Publicity Department of the Chinese Communist Party, entitled "On Opposing Bourgeois Liberalization," which raised the issue: "Should we promote capitalist reform or socialist reform?" On 11 June, the People's Daily published "A Critique of the Diversified Views on Bourgeois Liberalization". On 30 July, the People's Daily published a long article entitled "Who Says Socialism Is 'Unclear'?", criticizing that "'The theory that socialism is unclear' is a theory that mocks Marxism, ruins the communist party, and pours cold water on the masses who are exploring the road to socialism and building socialism". The sharp edge was directed at Deng Xiaoping's words: "What is socialism? What is Marxism? Our understanding of this issue in the past was not completely clear." On 5 October, the People's Daily published "Two Issues on the Combination of Planned Economy and Market Regulation". On 12 October, the People's Daily published a long article entitled "Firmly Establish Socialist Beliefs." On 17 December, the People's Daily published "Socialism Will Inevitably Replace Capitalism". On 24 December, Deng Xiaoping said: "We must never take the lead. This is a fundamental national policy. We cannot afford to take the lead, nor do we have the strength to do so. There will be absolutely no benefit in taking the lead, and we will lose many opportunities."

From 28 January to 18 February 1991, Deng Xiaoping inspected Shanghai and said, "Don't think that a planned economy is socialism, or a market economy is capitalism. That's not the case. Both are means, and the market can also serve socialism." From 15 February to 22 April 1991, Zhou Ruijin, secretary of the Party Committee of the Shanghai-based Jiefang Daily, along with Ling He, head of the newspaper's commentary department, and Shi Zhihong of the Shanghai Municipal Party Committee Research Office, published four articles in the Jiefang Daily under the pseudonym "Huangfuping" (meaning commentary by the Huangpu River), based on Deng Xiaoping's speech: "Being a 'Leader' in Reform and Opening Up," "Reform and Opening Up Needs New Ideas" (published 2 March), "The Consciousness of Expanding Opening Up Needs to Be Stronger" (published 22 March), and "Reform and Opening Up Needs a Large Number of Cadres with Both Integrity and Talent". These articles argued that reform and opening up was the only path to national strength and prosperity; planning and the market were not the dividing line between socialism and capitalism; being confined by the question of "whether it is socialist or capitalist" would lead to missed opportunities; and those who adhered to the reform and opening-up policy should be promoted without regard to seniority. In April, Xinhua News Agency's Banyuetan magazine published a commentary entitled "Unify Thinking and Understanding, and Promote Reform and Opening Up", openly supporting "Huangfuping."

On 15 March, in response to "Reform and Opening Up Needs New Ideas", People’s Daily published "Developing a Commodity Economy Cannot Neglect a Planned Economy". On 20 April, Contemporary Thought published "Can Reform and Opening Up Not Ask About Socialism or Capitalism?" The article said: "When the slogan of not asking about socialism or capitalism was popular, the trend of thought that advocated privatization and marketization in the economy, multi-party system and parliamentary system in politics, and pluralism in ideology once dragged the cause of socialist reform and opening up to a dead end." On 5 June, People’s Daily published Duan Ruofei's long article "Adhere to the People’s Democratic Dictatorship and Oppose and Prevent "Peaceful Evolution"", which brought up class struggle again. The article said that after the proletariat established a regime, it faced "dual tasks - class struggle and comprehensive construction".

On 20 May, the magazine Reform reprinted two articles by Huang Fuping: "Reform and Opening Up Need New Ideas" and "The Awareness of Expanding Opening Up Needs to Be Stronger." On 1 July, General Secretary Jiang Zemin, speaking at the celebration of the 70th anniversary of the founding of the Chinese Communist Party, stated that planning and the market are not the dividing line between socialism and capitalism. On 4 July, the Institute of Economics of the Chinese Academy of Social Sciences held a symposium on "Several Important Theoretical Issues in the Current Economic Field", where economists such as Wu Jinglian, Wei Xinghua, and Dai Yuanchen exchanged views on the question of whether the economy is socialist or capitalist.

On 11 July, The Pursuit of Truth published "Revisiting the Question of Socialism versus Capitalism". In late August, Qiushi magazine published "Continuing to Advance Reform and Opening Up Along the Socialist Direction". On 20 August, Contemporary Thought published "Why Can't We Ask Whether It's Socialist or Capitalist?", directly criticizing Huangfuping's use of the term "new ideological stagnation." On 31 August, the Jiefang Daily published "On the Mental State of Cadres". On the evening of September 1, Jiang Zemin saw the summary of the People's Daily editorial for the next day broadcast in advance on CCTV's News Broadcast. That night, he ordered the People's Daily to delete the sentence "In the process of reform and opening up, we must ask whether it is socialist or capitalist" from the editorial.

On 2 September, the People's Daily published "Three Problems in Current Reforms". On 23 October, the People's Daily published Deng Liqun's article, "Correctly Understanding the Contradictions in Socialist Society and Grasping the Initiative in Handling Contradictions". In November, Qiushi published "Vigorously Strengthening the Marxist Theory Training of Cadres". Higher Education Theory Front published "A Powerful Weapon for Building Socialism with Chinese Characteristics", and a series of articles, including "Eight Essays on the Historical Experience of Opposing Bourgeois Liberalization". In October, Premier Li Peng inspected Shanghai and accused Huang Fuping of disrupting ideological order inside and outside the Party. In December, the front page of the Jiefang Daily published articles titled "Reform Requires Courage and Strategy" and "On the Need for Courage and Strategy in Reform".

On 5 January 1992, Theoretical Dynamics published Deng Liqun's "Three Essays on the Opposition to Peaceful Evolution" written under the pen name "Hua Zhiqiao" . From January to February, Deng Xiaoping made his southern tour, stating that the criteria for judging whether something is capitalist or socialist should primarily be based on "whether it is conducive to developing the productive forces of socialist society, whether it is conducive to enhancing the comprehensive national strength of the socialist country, and whether it is conducive to improving the people's living standards " (the "three benefits ". The two-year debate on "socialism versus capitalism" thus ended in victory for the reformists. In June, Jiang Zemin delivered a speech supporting Deng Xiaoping, which encouraged Xue Muqiao, who published three articles in July, September, and December. The 14th National Congress of the Chinese Communist Party, which began on 12 October, established China's economic system as a socialist market economy.

On 13 October, Xie Wanying, director of the archives of the School of Economics at Peking University and associate research librarian (an associate senior professional title in the field of archives, equivalent to an associate professor), wrote "Communism will surely win" on the title page of Qiushi on her desk and committed suicide by jumping off a building. On 19 October, Zhu Rongji, the leading figure of the reformists and then Vice Premier of the State Council, was elected as a member of the Politburo Standing Committee, while the conservatives Chen Yun, Song Ping, Yao Yilin, Deng Liqun and others retired after the 14th Party National Congress. In November, Wang Renzhi was transferred from his position as Head of the Publicity Department after failing to be elected as a member of the Central Committee, and Gao Di was transferred from his position as president of the People's Daily. In 1993, Zhou Ruijin was promoted to deputy editor-in-chief of the People's Daily and president of the East China branch. On 29 March 1993, the socialist market economy was enshrined in the Constitution of China at the first session of the 8th National People's Congress.
