= Cong (surname) =

Chinese family name

Cong (丛/叢)
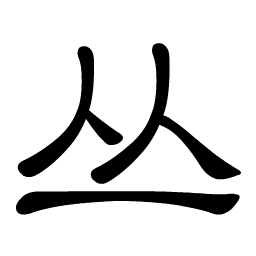
- Cong in Simplified characters
- Romanization: Ts'ung, Tsung
- Pronunciation: Cóng (Mandarin)
- Language: Chinese

Origin
- Origin: Xiongnu

Cong, Cung or Tsung (丛/叢) is a Chinese surname.

== Definition ==
Cong (叢/丛) is a Chinese word (noun quantifier) meaning clump, thicket, bush, and/or shrubbery. The word is also a measure word for flowers however has been informally used for a group of people or things.

== Other similar surnames ==
Not to be confused with other surname pronounced "Cong", "Cung", or "Tsung", for example, 从/從 (see Cong (surname ranked 271)) or 欉 (see Cong (rare surname in Taiwan)).

== Background ==
Cong (丛/叢) surname is the name of a relatively small population of Chinese. The surname is said to be from a group of people in Wendeng (文登) in China's Shandong province. Residents with this surname can also be found In Japan, Korea, Mongolia and other Asian countries.

== Historical origins ==
The Congs are originally of Xiongnu origin. They trace their ancestry to King Xiutu of the Xiongnu. In 121 BC, Xiongnu King Hunxie killed King Xiutu when Xiutu refused to surrender to the Chinese with Hunxie. The fourteen-year-old Crown Prince Midi was taken to China and raised as a stable hand. One day, when Emperor Wu of Han was inspecting the horses with his wives, all the servants were mesmerized by the royal entourage, except for Midi. Emperor Wu of Han took favor of the prince and granted him the Chinese surname Jin, meaning gold, because the prince used to make sacrifices with golden statues as a part of the Xiongnu rituals.

Jin Midi and his descendants later rose to prominent positions in the Han court. However, due to dynastic changes, the descendants of Jin Midi were persecuted for their royalist ties to the Han Dynasty. They escaped and after over forty years of wandering, they eventually arrived at Cong Hill in Buye (modern day Wendeng District, Weihai, Shandong Province), and changed their surname to Cong.

== Rank ==
Cong is ranked as the 127th most popular Chinese surname. The population with the surname Cong tend to be more concentrated in the northern regions of China.

People with the last name Cong accounts for about 0.1% of Han population.

== Notable people ==
- Cong Huanling (born 1978), Chinese rower
- Jason Cong (丛京生; born 1963), Chinese-born American computer scientist, educator and entrepreneur
- Cong Peiwu (丛培武; born 1976), Chinese diplomat formerly serving as Chinese Ambassador to Canada
- Cong Weixi (从维熙; 19332019), Chinese novelist
- Cong Wenjing (从文景; born 1962), Chinese politician
- Cong Yanxia (丛艳霞; born 1976), former handball player
- Cong Yuzhen (simplified Chinese: 丛玉珍; traditional Chinese: 叢玉珍; born 1963), Chinese shot put athlete

== See also ==
- http://www.congshi.net/
