= Zhou Jiangyong =

Chinese politician

- 周江勇

Party Secretary of Hangzhou
- In office 14 May 2018 – 21 August 2021
- Deputy: Xu Liyi (Mayor); Liu Xin
- Preceded by: Zhao Yide
- Succeeded by: Liu Jie

Party Secretary of Wenzhou
- In office 21 February 2017 – 29 May 2018
- Deputy: Zhang Geng (Mayor); Yao Gaoyuan
- Preceded by: Xu Liyi
- Succeeded by: Chen Weijun

Party Secretary of Zhoushan
- In office 24 August 2015 – 20 February 2018
- Deputy: Wen Nuan (Mayor)
- Preceded by: Sun Jingmiao
- Succeeded by: Yu Donglai

Mayor of Zhoushan
- In office 19 March 2013 – 7 January 2016; Acting: 19 March 2013 – 21 February 2014
- Party Secretary: Sun Jingmiao
- Preceded by: Zhou Guohui
- Succeeded by: Wen Nuan

Personal details
- Born: September 1967 (age 59) Ningbo, Zhejiang, China
- Party: Chinese Communist Party (expelled)
- Education: Yuyao Normal School; Party School of Hangzhou Municipal Committee of the Chinese Communist Party

Zhou Jiangyong (Chinese: 周江勇; pinyin: Zhōu Jiāngyǒng; born September 1967) is a former Chinese politician and member of the Chinese Communist Party (CCP). He was investigated by China's top anti-graft agency in August 2021. Previously he served as CCP secretary of Hangzhou. He is the first ministerial-level official caught in Zhejiang since the 19th CCP National Congress in 2017. In 2023, he was found guilty of corruption, stripped of all his assets, and sentenced to life imprisonment in 2024.

== Biography ==
Zhou was born in Ningbo, Zhejiang, in September 1967. After graduating from Yuyao Normal School in 1985, he became a teacher at Jiangshan School.

He began his political career in December 1988, when he was appointed a member of the standing committee of the Yin County Committee of the Communist Youth League of China. In January 2001, he became vice magistrate of Yin County. In September 2002, he was named magistrate of Xiangshan County, concurrently holding the deputy party secretary position. In March 2013 he was promoted to become mayor of Zhoushan, a position he held until December 2015. He was party secretary of Zhoushan in August 2015, and held that office until February 2017. In February 2017, he was appointed party secretary of Wenzhou, he remained in that position until May 2018, when he was transferred to Hangzhou and appointed party secretary.

=== Downfall ===
On 21 August 2021, he was put under investigation for alleged "serious violations of discipline and laws" by the Central Commission for Discipline Inspection (CCDI), the CCP's internal disciplinary body, and the National Supervisory Commission, the highest anti-corruption agency of China. His subordinate, Ma Xiaohui, handed himself in to the anti-corruption agency of China on August 19.

After he stepped down, the local anti-corruption agency announced the rectification of "outstanding problems in family relations, government relations and business relations", covering all in-service and retired and resigned municipal management leading cadres in recent three years.

On 27 January 2022, Zhou was formally expelled from the party. In February 2022, the Supreme People's Procuratorate made a decision to arrest Zhou on suspicion of accepting bribes. In April 2022, the investigation on the suspected bribery case was concluded by the National Supervisory Commission. On April 27, 2023, at a public trial in the Intermediate People's Court in Chuzhou, Zhou pled guilty for accepting bribes amounting to more than ¥193 million. Following this, the court adjourned for a sentencing date. On July 25, 2023, he was sentenced to death with a two-year reprive, and his political rights deprived for life and his assets confisticated. In 2024, the Intermediate People's Court sentenced Zhou to life in prison.

== Family ==
His wife is deputy secretary and chief supervisor of Ningbo Rural Commercial Bank. Internal staff revealed: "(she) is hanging a post there. She seldom comes at ordinary times and makes tens of millions of yuan a year. This has led to the indignation of the internal staff of the bank. They have been reporting jointly for a long time. In mid October last year, the Fourth Inspection Team of the Central Committee stationed in Zhejiang, and they reported again in their real name. "

His younger brother Zhou Jianyong (周健勇) is an associate professor of the School of Management of Shanghai University of Technology and businessman. He is a shareholder of four companies including Ningbo Yongrun Industry and Trade Technology Co., Ltd. (宁波永润工贸科技有限公司) and is involved in the fields of petrochemical industry, subway payment and big data.

Zhou Wenyong (周文勇), a relative of Zhou Jiangyong, is also a businessman. He was arrested in Shandong. He participated in and controlled 13 companies, covering electromechanical, energy, petrochemical, automobile sales, investment, guarantee, management consulting and many other fields, mainly concentrated in Yinzhou District and Haishu District. Zhou Jiangyong's elder sister is also a businesswoman, and was also arrested.

Government offices
Preceded by Zhou Guohui	Mayor of Zhoushan; 2013–2015	Succeeded by Wen Nuan
Party political offices
Preceded by Sun Jingmiao	Party Secretary of Zhoushan; 2015–2018	Succeeded by Yu Donglai
Preceded by Xu Liyi	Party Secretary of Wenzhou; 2017–2018	Succeeded by Chen Weijun
Preceded by Zhao Yide	Party Secretary of Hangzhou; 2018–2021	Succeeded by Liu Jie
