= Zheng Renhao =

Chinese politician (born 1968)

- 郑人豪

Director of the Guangdong Provincial Development and Reform Commission
- In office May 2021 – May 2022
- Preceded by: Ge Changwei
- Succeeded by: Ai Xuefeng

Personal details
- Born: June 1968 (age 58) Shantou, Guangdong, China
- Party: Chinese Communist Party
- Education: Zhongnan University of Economics and Law; China University of Political Science and Law

Chinese name
- Simplified Chinese: 郑人豪
- Traditional Chinese: 鄭人豪
Transcriptions
Standard Mandarin
- Hanyu Pinyin: Zhèng Rénháo

Zheng Renhao (Chinese: 郑人豪; born June 1968) is a former Chinese politician who spent his entire career in south China's Guangdong province. He was investigated by China's top anti-graft agency in December 2022. Previously he served as deputy secretary-general of Guangdong Provincial People's Government.

He was a representative of the 19th National Congress of the Chinese Communist Party. He was a delegate to the 12th National People's Congress.

== Early life and education ==
Zheng was born in Shantou, Guangdong, in June 1968, and graduated from Zhongnan University of Economics and Law in 1990. From 2004 to 2007 he did his postgraduate work at China University of Political Science and Law. He also studied at the California State University, Sun Yat-sen University and the Central Party School of the Chinese Communist Party as a part-time student.

== Political career ==
Zheng joined the Chinese Communist Party (CCP) in December 1988.

Starting in July 1990, Zheng served in several posts in Guangdong Provincial People's Procuratorate, including recorder, secretary, assistant prosecutor, and deputy director. In August 2003, he became deputy head of the Department of Civil Affairs of Guangdong Province, and worked there for five years.

In July 2008, he became vice mayor of his home-city Shantou, rising to mayor in January 2012.

In April 2016, he was named acting mayor of Zhuhai, confirmed in June of that same year.

He was party secretary of Zhanjiang in March 2017, in addition to serving as chairperson of Zhanjiang Municipal People's Congress since the following month.

In May 2021, he was appointed director of the Guangdong Provincial Development and Reform Commission, but having held the position for only a year, when he was named deputy secretary-general of Guangdong Provincial People's Government.

== Investigation ==
On 16 December 2022, he has been placed under investigation for "serious violations of laws and regulations" by the Central Commission for Discipline Inspection (CCDI), the party's internal disciplinary body, and the National Supervisory Commission, the highest anti-corruption agency of China.

Government offices
Preceded by Cai Zongze	Mayor of Shantou; 2011–2016	Succeeded by Liu Xiaotao
Preceded by Jiang Ling	Mayor of Zhuhai; 2016–2017	Succeeded by Li Zezhong
Preceded by Ge Changwei	Director of the Guangdong Provincial Development and Reform Commission; 2021–2022	Succeeded by Ai Xuefeng
Party political offices
Preceded by Wei Hongguang	Communist Party Secretary of Zhanjiang; 2017–2022	Succeeded by Liu Hongbing
