= Liu Jie (politician, born 1970) =

Chinese politician

- 刘捷
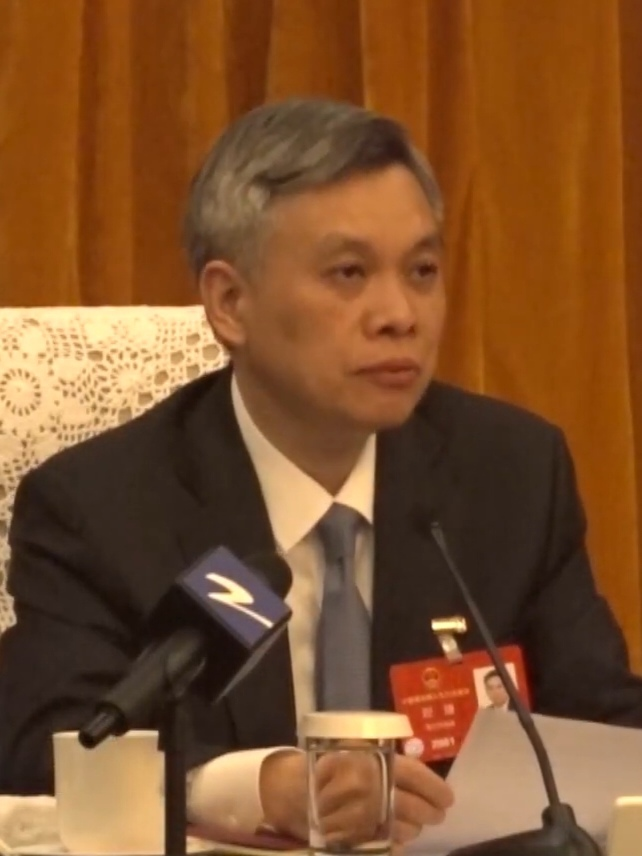
- Liu at the Third session of the 14th National People's Congress

Governor of Zhejiang
- Incumbent
- Assumed office 18 December 2024; Acting: 18 December 2024 – 17 January 2025
- Deputy: Xu Wenguang (executive vice governor)
- Preceded by: Wang Hao

Party Secretary of Hangzhou
- In office 2 December 2021 – December 2024
- Deputy: Liu Xin (mayor); Yao Gaoyuan
- Preceded by: Zhou Jiangyong
- Succeeded by: Liu Fei

Personal details
- Born: January 1970 (age 56) Danyang, Jiangsu, China
- Party: Chinese Communist Party
- Education: University of Science and Technology Beijing; China University of Geosciences

Chinese name
- Simplified Chinese: 刘捷
- Traditional Chinese: 劉捷
Transcriptions
Standard Mandarin
- Hanyu Pinyin: Liú Jié

Liu Jie (Chinese: 刘捷; pinyin: Liú Jié; born January 1970) is a Chinese politician and member of the Chinese Communist Party (CCP), who has been serving as the Governor of Zhejiang since 18 December 2024. Previously, he served as the party secretary of Hangzhou from 2021 to 2024 and specifically designated deputy party secretary of Zhejiang from 2023 to 2024.

== Early life and education ==
Liu was born in 1970 in the city of Danyang in Jiangsu Province. From September 1988 to August 1992, he studied in the Department of Metallurgy at the University of Science and Technology Beijing, majoring in iron and steel metallurgy. In 2003, he studied at the Wuhan University of Science and Technology, where he majored in iron and steel metallurgy, and obtained a master's degree in engineering.

In 2008, he majored in resource industry economics and earned the Doctor of Engineering at the China University of Geosciences in Wuhan.

== Industrial career ==
From August 1992 to December 2003, he worked at the Xiangtan Iron and Steel Company in Hunan, where he worked as technician, deputy director of the converter workshop, deputy director and director of the company's steelmaking plants.

Liu served as the assistant to the general manager and director of the steelmaking plant of the Xiangtan Iron and Steel Company from March 2003 to July 2003 and assistant to the general manager of the Xianggang Business Department of Hunan Valin Pipeline Co. Ltd., from September 2000 to 2003.

== Political career ==
=== Hunan ===
From August 2008 to June 2011, he served as the director of the Hunan Provincial Department of Commerce and from June 2011 to December 2011, he served as the director of the Hunan Provincial Department of Commerce, and the deputy secretary of the Party Working Committee of Chang-Zhu-Tan.

=== Jiangxi ===
In December 2011, he appointed as Deputy Secretary and Mayor of Xinyu Municipal Committee and in August 2013, he served as Secretary of the Xinyu Municipal Party Committee of Jiangxi Province. From September 2016 to November 2016, he served as the Deputy Secretary-General of the Jiangxi Provincial Party Committee (at the department level). From November 2016 to May 2018, he served as a member of the Standing Committee and Secretary-General of the Jiangxi Provincial Party Committee.

=== Guizhou ===
From May 2018 to July 2020, Liu served as a member of the Standing Committee of the Guizhou Provincial Party Committee and Secretary-General of the Provincial Party Committee. He later served the minister of the Organization Department, as well as the president of the Party School of the Guizhou Provincial Party Committee and the President of the Guizhou School of Administration from July 2020 to September 2020.

=== Zhejiang ===
In December 2021, following the stepping down of Zhou Jiangyong due to investigation on him by the Central Commission for Discipline Inspection (CCDI), Liu succeeded Zhou as the CCP secretary of Hangzhou following a decision of the meeting by the leading party cadres within the Hangzhou Municipal Party Committee. Liu was also appointed as a member of the Zhejiang Provincial Party Committee, a member of the Standing Committee and the Secretary of the Hangzhou Municipal Party Committee. On 26 February 2022, the 13th Hangzhou Municipal Committee of the CCP held its first plenary meeting, and Liu was elected Secretary of the Municipal Party Committee. In October 2023, he was appointed specifically designated deputy Communist party secretary of Zhejiang and continued to serve as Communist party secretary of Hangzhou. During his tenure, Liu presided over the 2022 Asian Games held in Hangzhou.

In December 2024, Liu was appointed Communist party secretary of the People's Government of Zhejiang. On 18 December 2024, he was appointed Acting Governor of Zhejiang. On 17 January 2025, he was elected Governor of Zhejiang. At the time of his appointment, Liu was the youngest provincial governor in China. On 29 October 2026, at the fifth plenary session of the 20th CCP Central Committee, he was elected as a member of the Central Committee.

Business positions
Preceded by Cao Huiquan	General Manager of Xiangtan Iron and Steel Group Co., Ltd. 2005–2008	Succeeded by Zhou Haibin
Party political offices
Preceded by Li Anze	Party Secretary of Xinyu; 2013–2016	Succeeded by Jiang Bin
Preceded by Zhu Hong	Secretary-General of the Jiangxi Provincial Committee of the Chinese Communist Party; 2016–2018	Succeeded by Zhao Liping
Preceded by Tang Chengpei	Secretary-General of the Guizhou Provincial Committee of the Chinese Communist Party; 2018–2020	Succeeded by Wu Qiang
Preceded by Li Yifei	Head of the Organization Department of the Guizhou Provincial Committee of the Chinese Communist Party; 2020–2021	Succeeded by Shi Yubao
Preceded by Zhou Jiangyong	Party Secretary of Hangzhou; 2021–2024	Vacant
Government offices
Preceded by Xiang Lili	Director of Hunan Provincial Commerce Department; 2008–2011	Succeeded by Xie Jianhui
Preceded by Wei Xuanjun	Mayor of Xinyu; 2011–2013	Succeeded by Cong Wenjing
Preceded by Wang Hao	Governor of Zhejiang; 2024–present	Incumbent
