= Chen Weijun =

Chinese politician (born 1966)

- 陈伟俊

Executive Vice Chairman of the Xinjiang Uygur Autonomous Regional People's Government
- In office June 2021 – November 2025
- Governor: Shohrat Zakir; Erkin Tuniyaz
- Preceded by: Zhang Chunlin

Personal details
- Born: June 1966 (age 60) Ninghai County, Zhejiang, China
- Party: Chinese Communist Party (1985-2026, expelled)
- Education: Ningbo University of Technology; Zhejiang University; Central Party School of the Chinese Communist Party

Chinese name
- Simplified Chinese: 陈伟俊
- Traditional Chinese: 陳偉俊
Transcriptions
Standard Mandarin
- Hanyu Pinyin: Chén Wěijùn

Chen Weijun (Chinese: 陈伟俊; born June 1966) is a former Chinese politician who spent his entire career in both Zhejiang and Xinjiang. He was investigated by China's top anti-graft agency in November 2025. By Central Commission for Discipline Inspection And National Supervisory Commission Previously he served as executive vice chairman of the Xinjiang Uygur Autonomous Regional People's Government.

Chen was a representative to the 19th and 20th National Congress of the Chinese Communist Party and a deputy to the 14th National People's Congress.

== Early life and education ==
Chen was born in Ninghai County, Zhejiang in June 1966. In 1984, he enrolled at the Secretariat Department of Ningbo Junior College (now Ningbo University of Technology), majoring in secretarial studies. During this period, he joined the Chinese Communist Party (CCP) in June 1985.

== Career ==
After graduation in August 1986, Chen commenced his political career as a secretary in the CCP Changjie District Committee of Ninghai County. Over the following years, he steadily progressed through various local administrative roles. From August 1987 to December 1991, he served as a secretary in the Office of the CCP Ninghai County Committee, later becoming head of its Secretariat Division by December 1991. In April 1993, he was appointed secretary of the Ninghai County Committee of the Communist Youth League of China.

Chen's leadership experience expanded with his appointment in January 1995 as deputy party secretary and town mayor of Qiantong in Ninghai County. By November 1995, he was promoted to party secretary and chairperson of the People's Congress of Qiantong. In March 1997, he was promoted to deputy magistrate of Ninghai County, during which he furthered his education by attending a postgraduate economics program at Zhejiang University from March 1996 to February 1998 and a training program for young cadres at the CCP Zhejiang Provincial Party School from October 1997 to January 1998. In November 1999, Chen was made vice mayor of Fenghua, and later became deputy party secretary and acting mayor in September 2002, with his mayoral appointment confirmed in February 2003. By March 2006, Chen was appointed deputy party secretary and acting mayor of Yuyao, a role that was confirmed in February 2007. In July 2009, he was promoted to party secretary and mayor, and by November 2009, he served exclusively as party secretary. In November 2011, Chen was assigned as party secretary of Yinzhou District in Ningbo, in addition to serving as party secretary of the Ningbo Airport and Logistics Park.

In December 2013, Chen was transferred to Huzhou and named deputy party secretary and acting mayor, confirmed in February 2014. He was elevated to party secretary in February 2017.

In January 2018, Chen was appointed vice governor of Zhejiang and concurrently party secretary of Wenzhou, with the latter role assumed in May 2018. In July 2019, he was admitted to standing committee member of the CCP Zhejiang Provincial Committee, the province's top authority.

In May 2021, Chen was transferred to the Xinjiang Uygur Autonomous Region as a standing committee member of the regional party committee. In June of the following month, he was made executive vice chairman of the Xinjiang Uygur Autonomous Regional People's Government.

== Investigation ==
On 30 November 2025, Chen came under investigation for "serious violations of discipline and laws" by the Central Commission for Discipline Inspection (CCDI), the party's internal disciplinary body, and the National Supervisory Commission, the highest anti-corruption agency of China. Chen was expelled from the party and dismissed from public office on 8 June 2026.

Government offices
| Preceded by Jin Changzheng | Mayor of Huzhou; 2014–2017 | Succeeded by Qian Sanxiong |
| Preceded by Zhang Chunlin | Executive Vice Chairman of the Xinjiang Uygur Autonomous Regional People's Government; 2021–2025 | Succeeded by TBA |
Party political offices
| Preceded by Qiu Dongyao | Communist Party Secretary of Huzhou; 2017–2018 | Succeeded by Ma Xiaohui |
| Preceded by Zhou Jiangyong | Communist Party Secretary of Wenzhou; 2018–2021 | Succeeded by Liu Xiaotao |
