= Wang Renzhi =

Chinese politician (1933–2025)

- 王忍之

Head of the Publicity Department of the Chinese Communist Party
- In office February 1987 – December 1992
- Preceded by: Zhu Houze
- Succeeded by: Ding Guangen

Personal details
- Born: September 1933 Wuxi, Jiangsu, China
- Died: 4 February 2025 (aged 91) Beijing, China
- Party: Chinese Communist Party
- Education: Renmin University of China

Wang Renzhi (Chinese: 王忍之; pinyin: Wáng Rěnzhī; September 1933 - 4 February 2025) was a Chinese politician who was best known as a senior conservative theorist and associate of Deng Liqun. Wang served as head of the Publicity Department of the Chinese Communist Party between 1987 and 1992.

He was an alternate member of the 12th Central Committee of the Chinese Communist Party and a member of the 13th Central Committee of the Chinese Communist Party. He was a member of the Standing Committee of the 9th and 10th Chinese People's Political Consultative Conference.

== Early life and education ==
Wang was born in Wuxi, Jiangsu, in September 1933. He joined the Communist Youth League of China in June 1949 and the Chinese Communist Party (CCP) in November 1950.

== Career ==
After graduating from the Renmin University of China in 1957, he carried out research on history, logic, the international communist movement, economic theory, and policy issues at the Political Research Office of the CCP Central Committee, the Marxist–Leninist Research Institute, and the National Development and Reform Commission.

After the Cultural Revolution, he served, from 1978, as a researcher and director of the Policy Research Office of the National Development and Reform Commission.

In April 1982, he became deputy chief editor of Red Flag and executive secretary of the State Council Economic Research Center.

In February 1987, he was appointed head of the Publicity Department of the Chinese Communist Party, remaining in that post until December 1992.

In November 1992, he became party secretary and vice president of the Chinese Academy of Social Sciences, a ministerial-level post. He died on 4 February 2025 at the age of 91.

Party political offices
Preceded by Zhu Houze	Head of the Publicity Department of the Chinese Communist Party; 1987–1992	Succeeded by Ding Guangen
