= Yan Mingfu =

Chinese politician (1931–2023)

- 阎明复
- Chairman: Li Xiannian

Vice Chairman of the Chinese People's Political Consultative Conference
- In office 10 April 1988 – 14 March 1990

Head of the United Front Work Department
- In office November 1985 – November 1990
- Preceded by: Yang Jingren
- Succeeded by: Ding Guangen

Personal details
- Born: 11 November 1931 Beijing, Republic of China
- Died: 3 July 2023 (aged 91)
- Party: Chinese Communist Party
- Spouse: Wu Keliang
- Children: Yan Lan

Yan Mingfu (Chinese: 阎明复; pinyin: Yán Míngfù; 11 November 1931 – 3 July 2023) was a Chinese politician. His first prominent role in government began in 1985, when he was made leader of the United Front Work Department for the Chinese Communist Party (CCP). He held the position until the Politburo expelled him for his sympathies with the 1989 Tiananmen Square protestors. Yan returned to government work in 1991 when he became a vice minister of Civil Affairs.

== Early career ==
Yan was born in Beijing on 11 November 1931, and later became a native of Haicheng, Liaoning. In 1949, he graduated from the Harbin Foreign Language College. He then became the official Russian translator for Mao Zedong, before being promoted to a high-ranking party position sometime in the late 1950s. During the Cultural Revolution he was arrested and did not reappear in a state position until 1985. His father, Yan Baohang, had been a member of both the Kuomintang and the CCP. Before Yan Mingfu was appointed head of the United Front Work Department in 1985, his father had held the position from the department's inception during the Chinese Civil War. When students began protesting China's corruption and economic problems after the death of Hu Yaobang on 15 April 1989, Yan was also serving as a Secretary in the 13th Politburo of the Chinese Communist Party.

== Participation in 1989 Tiananmen Square protests ==
From the beginning of the protests at Tiananmen Square, the Politburo's members had been working towards finding a resolution intended to pacify the students. Some officials favored engaging with their demands, but others, such as Li Peng, argued that instead, the most pressing issue was to "get students back into their classrooms" before the situation escalated. At a meeting held on 10 May, the Politburo, under the leadership of Zhao Ziyang, decided that holding discussions with every group involved in the protests would be an ideal path to resolving the students' issues; along with Hu Qili and Rui Xingwen, Yan was asked to speak to journalists from various papers throughout the capital. According to Zhang Liang, the compiler of the document collection The Tiananmen Papers, the three officials saw in the protests "an opportunity to move decisively toward fuller, more truthful reporting." Yan held his dialogue with Beijing's journalists from 11 to 13 May; throughout these discussions, he repeatedly voiced his support for the students' goals, played down the condemnation of the protest expressed in the April 26 Editorial, and argued Zhao was fully in favor of reforming the press.

After the students commenced their hunger strike on 13 May, the Politburo sent Yan to Tiananmen Square to call for an end to the protests and implore students to return to class. For the most part, the meeting went badly. In his discussion with the student leaders, he acknowledged that the decision to protest was justified while reaffirming the Politburo's desire to see the students return to their classrooms. He also condemned the decision to begin a hunger strike, telling the students that it "accomplishes nothing, either for the country or your own health. If you present your demands and suggestions through proper channels, I can responsibly tell you the door to dialogue is always open." The meeting ended with both groups feeling misunderstood; when Yan reported back to Zhao, he noted that the student leaders "are in disagreement among themselves."

On 14 May, Yan returned to the Great Hall of the People and told students that a dialogue to be held later in the day would be recorded and broadcast on national television. During the discussion that afternoon, Zhang says, Yan and Li Tieying maintained that their aim was "not to negotiate policy decisions but to exchange views and information." After the dialogue broke down, Dai Qing and a group of eleven other intellectuals notified Yan that they were willing to meet with the students and urge them to stop their hunger strike. When the intellectuals returned from the dialogue, they claimed that the students would listen if the government would compromise first. For Yan, this indicated that the "students are getting greedier, their demands are getting stiffer, and they're getting less and less unified among themselves." The intellectuals resumed the discussion, but it again ended without either party reaching a resolution.

On 16 May, Yan arrived at Tiananmen Square to advocate an end to the hunger strike. He offered himself as a hostage to demonstrate the sincerity of his belief that all issues would soon be resolved. The students believed his speech to be genuine, but they did not think that the government would truly capitulate. By 18 May, Yan had grown tired of the disagreements between the students and the government. At a meeting between Li Peng and the student leaders that day, he stated that the "only issue I am concerned with is that of saving the children who are hunger striking in the Square, who are now in a very weakened state, their lives gravely threatened." When Zhao was ousted on 21 May, Yan lost his major source of political support; on 23 June, the Politburo voted to eject him from his government positions. An article from The Asian Wall Street Journal contends that Yan "was criticized as handling the talks badly." According to Zhang, Yan's speech to students on 16 May also "became a major count against him" when the government began to expel its reform-minded members.

== Return to government and retirement ==
Yan did not reappear in Chinese politics until 1991, when he was named vice minister of Civil Affairs. The promotion occurred almost exactly two years after the 4 June Massacre, but a New York Times article says Yan and other recently rehabilitated officials "did not mention their 1989 political disgrace or say why they were given new jobs." According to Josephine Ma, Yan "lost his political clout" in 1996 and retired from all government work, although he remained involved in charity work and continued to serve as chairman of China's Charity Association. In 2007, Yan became China's chief negotiator with Taiwan for a brief period. While Yan's promotion to vice minister of Civil Affairs indicated that he was "partially rehabilitated", Ma reports that "observers" regarded his tenure as "the famous liberal's full rehabilitation."

Apart from these positions, Yan maintained a "low profile" after his retirement. In November 2018, former Chinese premier Wen Jiabao visited him in hospital on his 87th birthday.

Yan died on 3 July 2023, at the age of 91.
