= Gong Zheng =

Chinese politician (born 1960)

- 龚正
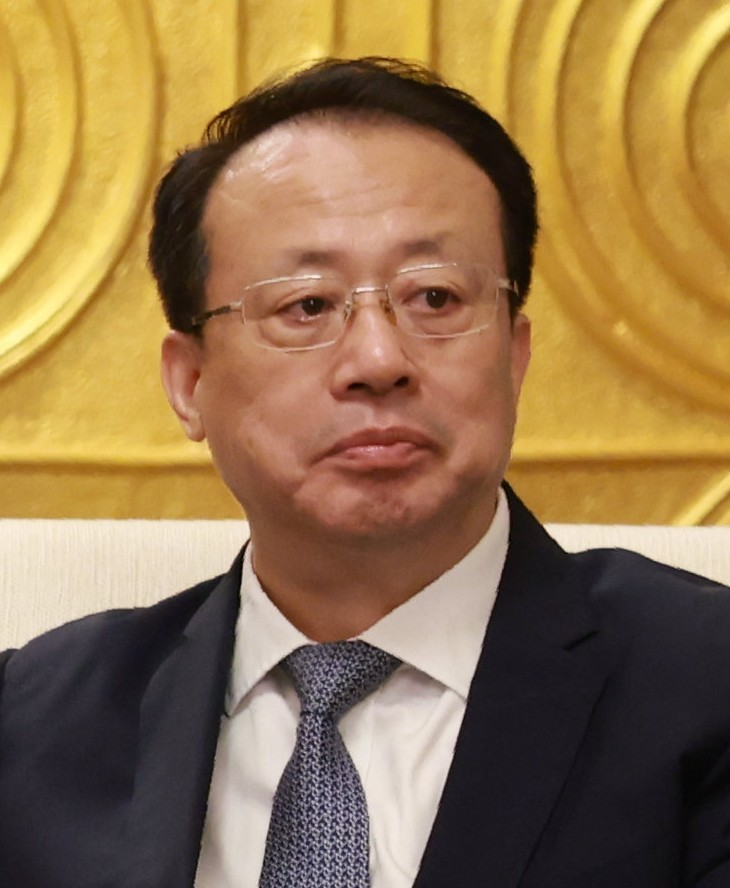
- Gong in 2026

Mayor of Shanghai
- In office March 23, 2020 – September 4, 2026
- Party Secretary: Li Qiang; Chen Jining
- Preceded by: Ying Yong
- Succeeded by: Zhu Zhongming

Governor of Shandong
- In office April 11, 2017 – April 17, 2020
- Party Secretary: Liu Jiayi
- Preceded by: Guo Shuqing
- Succeeded by: Li Ganjie

Party Secretary of Hangzhou
- In office October 8, 2013 – August 11, 2015
- Preceded by: Huang Kunming
- Succeeded by: Zhao Yide

Personal details
- Born: 4 March 1960 (age 66) Suzhou, Jiangsu, China
- Party: Chinese Communist Party
- Education: Beijing University of International Business and Economics; Golden Gate University; Xiamen University

Gong Zheng (Chinese: 龚正; pinyin: Gōng Zhèng; born 4 March 1960) is a Chinese politician who served as deputy secretary of the Chinese Communist Party Shanghai Committee and mayor of Shanghai.

Previously, Gong served as governor of Shandong, the CCP Secretary of Hangzhou, vice governor and executive vice governor of Zhejiang province, and deputy director of the General Administration of Customs.

== Early life and education ==
Gong was born in March 1960 in Suzhou, Jiangsu province. He graduated from Beijing Institute of Foreign Trade (now the University of International Business and Economics, UIBE) in 1982 and joined the Chinese General Administration of Customs. He furthered his studies at Golden Gate University's School of Taxation in 1987 and returned to UIBE, earning an MBA in 1997. From 2001 to 2004, he pursued doctoral studies at Xiamen University, obtaining a Ph.D. in economics.

== Political career ==
Gong served as deputy director of the Tianjin customs department from 1993 to 1996, and director of the Shenzhen customs department from 2001 to 2003. In 2003, he was promoted to deputy director of the General Administration of Customs.

In December 2008, Gong was appointed Vice Governor of Zhejiang province, and was promoted to Executive Vice Governor in June 2012. In September 2013, he became the Party Secretary of Hangzhou. In August 2015, Gong was named deputy party secretary of Shandong province, replacing Wang Junmin, who had reached the mandatory retirement age.

In April 2017, Gong was appointed Governor of Shandong.

=== Mayor of Shanghai ===
On March 23, 2020, Gong was appointed Mayor of Shanghai.

A Hangzhou official described Gong as an "open-minded" leader who spoke English reasonably well.

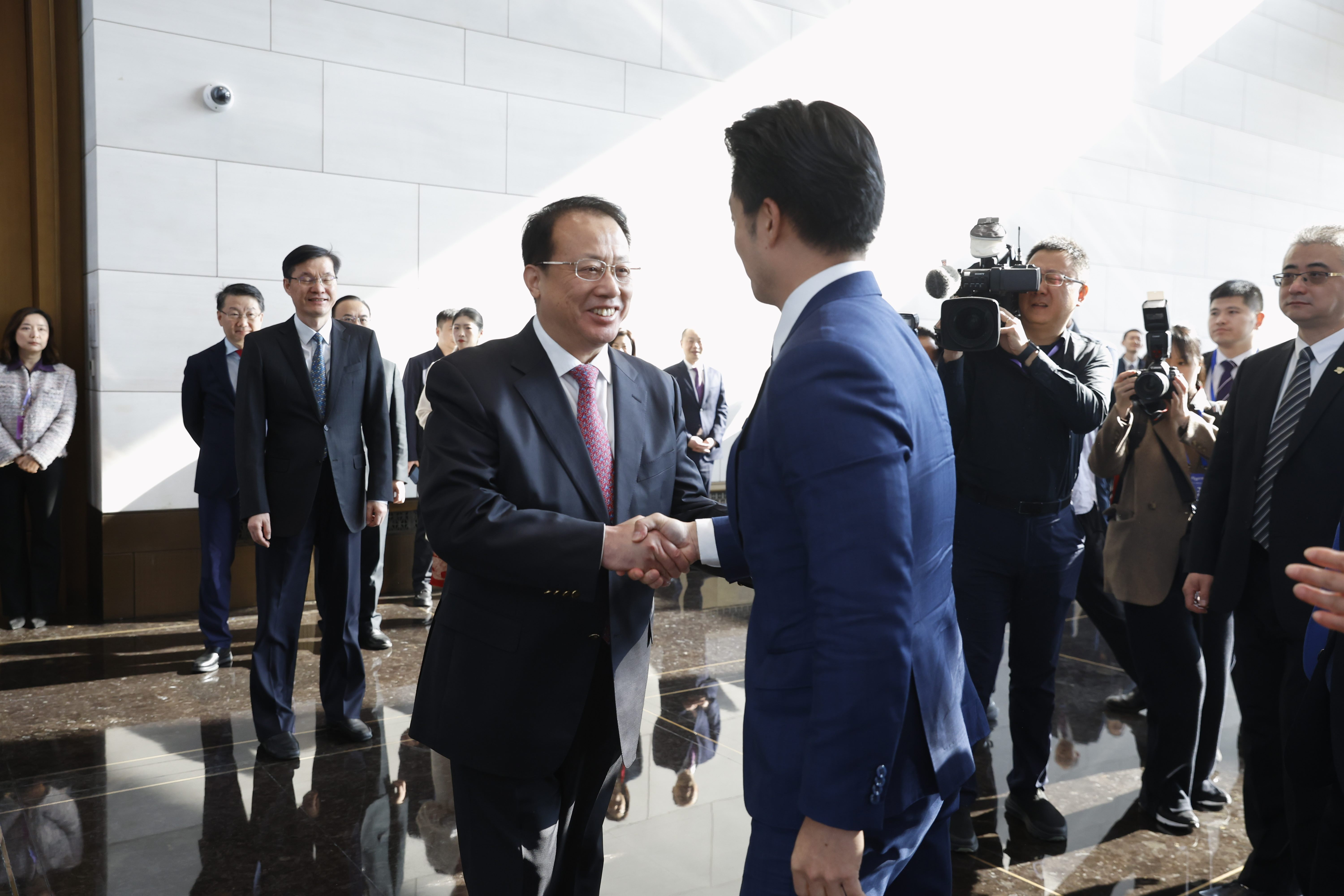
Gong Zheng meeting Taipei Mayor Chiang Wan-an at the 2025 Shanghai-Taipei City Forum

On April 29, 2023, Gong led a Shanghai delegation to visit Indonesia to comprehensively promote high-level practical cooperation between Shanghai and Indonesia in accordance with the important consensus reached by CCP general secretary Xi Jinping and President Joko Widodo to jointly build a community with a shared future between China and Indonesia. During the visit, Gong Zheng met with Indonesian Maritime and Investment Coordinating Minister Luhut Binsar Pandjaitan, Jakarta acting Governor Heru Budi Hartono, and Yogyakarta Special Administrative Region Government Executive Secretary Wiyos Santoso attended the Shanghai-Jakarta Symposium for Overseas Investment Enterprises and witnessed the signing of the project.

On September 4, 2026, Gong resigned as Mayor of Shanghai. On 6 November 2026, he was appointed as the vice chairman of the National People's Congress Financial and Economic Affairs Committee at the 25th meeting of the Standing Committee of the 14th National People's Congress.

Government offices
Preceded by Ying Yong	Mayor of Shanghai; 2020–2026	Succeeded by Zhu Zhongming
Preceded by Guo Shuqing	Governor of Shandong; 2017–2020	Succeeded by Li Ganjie
Party political offices
Preceded by Wang Junmin	Deputy Party Secretary of Shandong; 2015–2017	Succeeded by Wang Wentao
Preceded by Huang Kunming	Party Secretary of Hangzhou; 2013–2015	Succeeded by Zhao Yide
