= Pangdonglai =

Chinese retail chain

Xuchang Pangdonglai Commercial & Trading Group Co., Ltd.
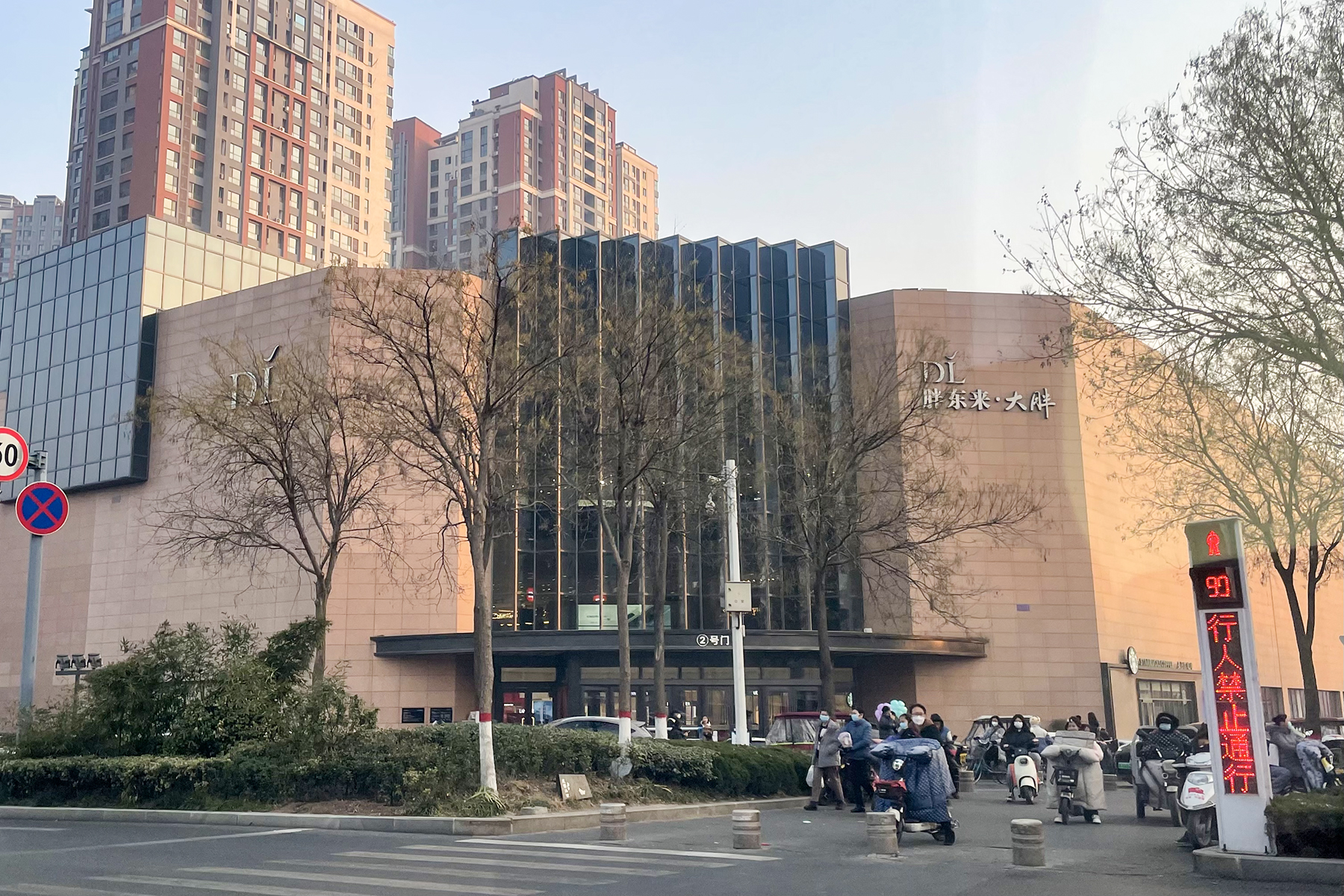
- Pangdonglai mall in Xinxiang, China
- Trade name: Pangdonglai
- Native name: 许昌市胖东来商贸集团有限公司
- Type: Private
- Industry: Retail
- Founded: March 1995; 31 years ago
- Founder: Yu Donglai
- Headquarters: No. 277 Qiyi Road, Weidu District, Xuchang, Henan, China
- Number of locations: 14 (2026)
- Revenue: ¥23.531 billion (2025) ▲38.71%
- Number of employees: 10,194 (2026)
- Unified Social Credit Code: 91411000706652094X
- Website: https://www.azpdl.cn/

Pangdonglai (lit. ‘Donglai the Fat’; Simplified Chinese: 胖东来, Traditional Chinese: 胖東來) is a retail corporation founded in March 1995 by Yu Donglai (于东来). It operates a chain of malls and grocery stores and is headquartered in Xuchang, Henan, China. The company is known for excellent customer service, and prioritizing work-life balance for its employees. In 2024 Pangdonglai paid out RMB¥8.8 million (US$1.2 million) in compensation to customers after a supplier was found to have violated food safety procedures. Its success has spurred imitation of its business style by competitors.

== History and development ==
=== Founding and early expansion ===
In March 1995, Yu Donglai founded the predecessor of Pangdonglai in Xuchang, Henan, as a small shop named Wangyuelou Pangzi Shop (望月楼胖子店; "Wangyuelou Fat Man's Shop"). Prior to establishing the business, Yu had been laid off and had worked selling ice pops and as a miner. The shop occupied just over 40 square metres and sold confectionery, tobacco and alcoholic beverages. Yu pledged to sell genuine products and accept returns from dissatisfied customers.

Pangdonglai opened its first branch in Xuchang in October 1997, marking its entry into supermarket retailing. In May 1999, the company introduced a large-format general-merchandise retail model to the city. In January 2002, it opened Pangdonglai Life Plaza, its first comprehensive flagship store.

=== Regional expansion and consolidation ===
In December 2005, Pangdonglai expanded beyond Xuchang by opening a department store on Pingyuan Road in Xinxiang, Henan. The company established a second retail complex in Xinxiang, Pangdonglai Life Plaza, in 2007. In April 2009, it opened Pangdonglai Times Square, a multistorey shopping complex in Xuchang. Its retail operations included department stores, supermarkets and specialist electrical-appliance outlets.

In 2012, Pangdonglai closed 13 profitable supermarket branches in Xuchang. Founder Yu Donglai subsequently attributed the reduction to the company's expansion having exceeded the management capabilities of himself and his team, making it difficult to maintain operational and service standards.

In December 2015, Pangdonglai closed its original Xinxiang department store following the expiration of its ten-year lease. In January 2016, the company purchased approximately 38,000 square metres of commercial property in Xinxiang for 196 million yuan. It reopened its department-store operations at the new location in September 2016 under the name Pangdonglai Dapang (胖东来·大胖).

Pangdonglai resumed opening new stores in Xuchang in 2019, following several years of limited expansion. In January 2023, the company opened Angel City (天使城), a shopping complex in Xuchang with a total floor area of approximately 70,000 square metres. The development included a supermarket, department stores, restaurants, a cinema and other retail facilities, bringing the company's total number of stores to 13.

In February 2025, Yu announced plans to expand into Zhengzhou, the capital of Henan, with a new supermarket near Zhengzhou East railway station. The project marked the company's planned entry into a third city, following its earlier expansion from Xuchang to Xinxiang.

On 23 December 2025, Pangdonglai began trial operations at its third store in Xinxiang, known as Sanpang (三胖). Located in the Hongqi District, the shopping complex had a total floor area of approximately 68,300 square metres and housed supermarkets, department stores, restaurants and other services. Its opening increased the company's retail network to 14 stores, comprising 11 in the Xuchang area and three in Xinxiang.

In August 2026, Yu announced that Pangdonglai would close its Xuchang Life Plaza store in December 2026. The store, which had opened in 2002 as the company's first large-scale retail complex, generated approximately 2 billion yuan in annual sales. Yu attributed the planned closure to longstanding lease-contract issues. The company was also investing in property developments under its own ownership, including the Mengzhicheng (梦之城) project in Xuchang, a commercial complex scheduled to open in 2029.

The company's planned Zhengzhou expansion was delayed repeatedly during 2026 because of the scale of construction work. By September, its first Zhengzhou store, located at Zhengzhou East Station's east square, was expected to open in early 2027. That month, the developer of the Hongfang (弘坊) commercial complex in Zhengzhou also announced plans for a second Pangdonglai location in the city.

== Locations ==
As of August 2026, Pangdonglai operated 14 stores in Henan: 11 in Xuchang, including one in Yuzhou, and three in Xinxiang.

=== Current stores ===
The following stores were listed in the company's directory in 2026.

Pangdonglai stores listed as operating in 2026
| Store | City | Opened | Notes |
|---|---|---|---|
| Laodong (劳动店) | Xuchang | August 2001 | Temporarily closed in September 2014 and reopened in January 2015. |
| Life Plaza (生活广场) | Xuchang | 1 January 2002 | The company's first large comprehensive shopping centre. In August 2026, Yu Donglai announced that it would close in December that year. |
| Dazhong Apparel (大众服饰) | Xuchang | September 2002 | Clothing and footwear store, also known as the Clothing and Footwear Building (服饰鞋业大楼). |
| Times Square (时代广场) | Xuchang | 25 April 2009 | On Qiyi Road. |
| Renmin (人民店) | Xuchang | November 2018 | Relocation opening at Weiyuan Plaza. |
| Yunding (云鼎店) | Xuchang | 26 April 2019 | Community supermarket in Yunding Plaza. |
| Jinsanjiao (金三角店) | Xuchang | 9 August 2019 | In Xinhezuo Plaza. |
| Beihai (北海店) | Xuchang | 6 December 2019 | In Jian'an District. |
| Yuzhou (禹州店) | Yuzhou | 16 August 2020 | Beneath the former Sports Park. |
| Jinhui (金汇店) | Xuchang | 23 April 2022 | In Hengda Jinhui Plaza. |
| Angel City (天使城) | Xuchang | 10 January 2023 | Shopping centre at the junction of Jian'an Avenue and Balong Road. |
| Life Plaza / Erpang (生活广场／二胖) | Xinxiang | 2007 | On Jiankang Road. |
| Dapang (大胖) | Xinxiang | September 2016 | On Renmin Middle Road. |
| Sanpang (三胖) | Xinxiang | 23 December 2025 | Trial opening of the company's third Xinxiang store. |

=== Former locations ===
Pangdonglai began closing smaller stores in Xuchang in 2012. A May 2013 report named 13 branches that had closed.

Documented former Pangdonglai locations
| Store | City | Closure or relocation | Notes and sources |
|---|---|---|---|
| Wangyue (望月店) | Xuchang | By May 2013 | |
| Wuyi (五一店) | Xuchang | By May 2013 | |
| Liuyi (六一店) | Xuchang | By May 2013 | |
| Xinxu (新许店) | Xuchang | By May 2013 | |
| Jian'an (建安店) | Xuchang | By May 2013 | |
| Jiankang (健康店) | Xuchang | By May 2013 | |
| Xinxing (新兴店) | Xuchang | By May 2013 | |
| Wangtian (望田店) | Xuchang | By May 2013 | |
| Yuxiu (毓秀店) | Xuchang | By May 2013 | |
| Dongguan (东关店) | Xuchang | By May 2013 | |
| Xidajie (西大街店) | Xuchang | By May 2013 | |
| Xufu (许扶店) | Xuchang | By May 2013 | |
| Guangming (光明店) | Xuchang | By May 2013 | |
| Xinxiang Department Store (新乡胖东来百货) | Xinxiang | 22 December 2015 | Former Pingyuan Road store. The replacement premises were developed into Dapang. |
| Original Renmin store (原人民店) | Xuchang | November 2018 | Relocated to Weiyuan Plaza. |
| Appliance City (电器城) | Xuchang | 2 January 2023 | The Qiyi Road premises closed and the business relocated to Angel City's fourth floor. |

=== Planned locations ===
In 2026, the company was developing a store beneath the east square of Zhengzhou East railway station and a supermarket at Technology Square in Xuchang. In September, the developer of Zhengzhou's Hongfang complex announced that it would accommodate a second Pangdonglai store in the city. The company's Dream City development in Xuchang was scheduled to open in September 2029.
