= Wang Junmin =

Chinese politician (1955–2018)

- 王军民

Deputy Communist Party Secretary of Shandong
- In office May 2012 – August 2015
- Preceded by: Liu Wei
- Succeeded by: Gong Zheng

Vice-Governor of Shandong
- In office June 2002 – August 2012

Head of Shandong Provincial Construction Bureau
- In office April 2000 – June 2002
- Preceded by: New position
- Succeeded by: Yang Huancai

Personal details
- Born: April 1955 Rongcheng, Shandong, China
- Died: November 12, 2018 (aged 63) Jinan, Shandong, China
- Party: Chinese Communist Party
- Education: Shandong University; East China Normal University; Central Party School of the Chinese Communist Party
- Occupation: Politician

Chinese name
- Traditional Chinese: 王軍民
- Simplified Chinese: 王军民
Transcriptions
Standard Mandarin
- Hanyu Pinyin: Wāng Jūnmín

Wang Junmin (Chinese: 王军民; April 1955 – 12 November 2018) was a Chinese politician who served as Deputy Communist Party Secretary of Shandong between May 2012 and August 2015. He also served as vice-governor of Shandong between June 2002 and August 2012. During his term in office, he headed the province's industrial and safe production work. He was a delegate to the 18th National Congress of the Chinese Communist Party.

== Biography ==
Wang was born in Rongcheng, Shandong in April 1955. He entered the workforce in February 1972, and joined the Chinese Communist Party (CCP) in December 1973. After resuming the college entrance examination in September 1983, he entered Shandong University, where he majored in scientific socialism. He was CCP Committee Secretary of Zhaoyuan County in February 1987, and held that office until May 1989. In 1989 he was promoted to become CCP Deputy Committee Secretary of Yantai, a position he held until 1992. At the end of 1992, he was transferred to Jinan, capital of Shandong province, where he was vice-governor of Shandong from June 2002 to August 2012. He rose to become Specific Deputy Communist Party Secretary of Shandong in August 2012, serving in the post until August 2015. On November 12, 2018, Wang died of illness in Jinan, Shandong, two months after his retirement.

Government offices
Previous: Zhao Kezhi	Director of Shandong Provincial Construction Committee; 1997-2000	Next: None
Previous: New position	Head of Shandong Provincial Construction Bureau; 2000-2002	Next: Yang Huancai (杨焕彩)
Party political offices
Previous: Zhuang Xiangxin (庄象鑫)	Communist Party Secretary of Zhaoyuan County; 1987-1989	Next: Liu Changsuo (刘长锁)
Previous: Liu Wei (刘伟)	Deputy Communist Party Secretary of Shandong; 2012-2015	Next: Gong Zheng
