= Xu Liyi =

Chinese politician

- 徐立毅

Communist Party Secretary of Zhengzhou
- In office 11 June 2019 – 20 January 2022
- Deputy: Wang Xinwei; Hou Hong (mayor)
- Preceded by: Ma Yi
- Succeeded by: An Wei

Mayor of Hangzhou
- In office February 2017 – June 2019
- Party Secretary: Zhao Yide; Zhou Jiangyong
- Preceded by: Zhang Hongming
- Succeeded by: Liu Xin

Communist Party Secretary of Wenzhou
- In office January 2016 – February 2017
- Deputy: Zhang Geng
- Preceded by: Chen Yixin
- Succeeded by: Zhou Jiangyong

Mayor of Wenzhou
- In office April 2015 – January 2016
- Party Secretary: Chen Yixin
- Preceded by: Chen Jinbiao
- Succeeded by: Zhang Geng

Personal details
- Born: 13 August 1964 (age 61) Shaoxing, Zhejiang, China
- Party: Chinese Communist Party
- Education: Zhejiang University; Central Party School of the Chinese Communist Party

Xu Liyi (Chinese: 徐立毅; pinyin: Xú Lìyì; born 13 August 1964) is a Chinese politician who served as party secretary of Zhengzhou from 2019 to 2022. He was removed from his post due to under-reporting the number of people who died or went missing during the 2021 Henan floods. He previously served as mayor of Hangzhou and before that, mayor and party secretary of Wenzhou. He is a delegate to the 13th National People's Congress.

== Early life and education ==
Xu was born in Shaoxing, Zhejiang, on 13 August 1964. After resuming the college entrance examination, in 1979, he was accepted to Hangzhou University (now Zhejiang University), majoring in geography.

== Career in Zhejiang ==
Xu got involved in politics in August 1983, joined the Chinese Communist Party (CCP) in May 1986. Xu worked in Yuyao, a county-level city the jurisdiction of Ningbo, from 1983 to 2001, and then Ningbo, from 2001 to 2006. In November 2006, he was transferred to Hangzhou, capital of Zhejiang, where he successively worked as party secretary of Jianggan District and Yuhang District. In March 2014, he became vice mayor of Hangzhou, but held the position for only one year. He became mayor of Wenzhou in April 2015, and then party secretary, the top political position in the city, beginning in January 2016. In February 2017, he was promoted to acting mayor of Hangzhou, confirmed in April.

== Career in Henan ==
In June 2019, he was assigned to central Henan province and appointed party secretary of its capital Zhengzhou. He was also admitted to member of the standing committee of the CCP Henan Provincial Committee, the province's top authority. During his tenure, the 2021 Henan floods broke out, Xu and his subordinates committed dereliction of duty and concealed 139 deaths and missing persons. On 21 January 2022, he has been given a serious warning as a measure of party discipline and had his civil servant rank downgraded.

Government offices
Preceded by Chen Jinbiao	Mayor of Wenzhou; 2015–2016	Succeeded by Zhang Geng
Preceded by Zhang Hongming	Mayor of Hangzhou; 2017–2020	Succeeded by Liu Xin
Party political offices
Preceded by Zhang Geng	Communist Party Secretary of Wenzhou; 2016–2017	Succeeded by Chen Yixin
Preceded by Ma Yi	Communist Party Secretary of Zhengzhou; 2019–2022	Succeeded by An Wei
