= Yan Lan =

Franco-Chinese lawyer

Yan Lan (born January 17, 1957, in Beijing) is a Franco-Chinese lawyer, investment banker and writer who is best known for directing the Chinese activities of the U.S.-based Lazard asset management firm, and for authoring a memoir on her family's experience of China's Cultural Revolution.

== Early life ==
An only child, Lan was born in a family that was part China's ruling class. At first bourgeois and Protestant, her family joined communism in the 1930s. Yan Lan was close to Deng Xiaoping, with whom she vacationed as a child.

== The trauma of the Cultural Revolution ==
Lan has said her experience of China's Cultural Revolution was "like a nightmare".

Her paternal grandfather, Yan Baohang, is a hero of the Second Sino-Japanese War. He informed the USSR of the imminent launch of Operation Barbarossa. In November 1967, during the Cultural Revolution, despite his status as a senior official of the Communist Party, he was accused of revisionism and of spying for the Soviet Union and placed under house arrest. He died in detention a few months later.

Her father, Yan Mingfu, was an official interpreter of Russian for Mao Zedong, notably in his discussions with Nikita Khrushchev. Arrested in 1966, he was imprisoned at the Qincheng Prison and beaten during the Cultural Revolution.

Her mother, Wu Keliang, is a diplomat and an interpreter of Italian. Described by her daughter as a determined intellectual, she was assigned to a labor camp for re-education, and joined by her daughter in March 1969. She educated her daughter to have a "boyish character" and introduced her to French literature, including Balzac, Maupassant and Victor Hugo.

== Studies ==
With the death of Mao and the end of the Cultural Revolution, the Yan family reintegrated Chinese society and regained its prominent status. Lan entered the Beijing Foreign Studies University in 1977, where she studied French. She then attended Peking University, where she graduated with a master's degree in 1984. In 1988, she obtained a doctorate in interstate arbitration law from the Graduate Institute of International Studies in Geneva, which dedicated to her a place in its Hall of Inspiring Stories. She then became an associate researcher at Harvard University. In 1994, she was admitted to the Paris Bar Association.

== Banking career ==
She joined the law firm Gide Loyrette Nouel as a business lawyer in 1991, and became head of its Chinese branch in 1998. She then became the firm's first female partner.

In 2011, she created and managed Lazard's office for Greater China (China, Hong Kong, Taiwan), where she specialized in mergers and acquisitions. In particular, she advised large French companies such as Areva and Saint-Gobain for their Chinese activities. In 2019, Lazard appointed her vice chairman of investment banking / chairman and CEO of Greater China.

== Author's career ==
In 2017, she published The House of Yan at Allary Éditions. The book was published in English by HarperCollins in 2020. It is an autobiography in which she tells the story of her family and, simultaneously, that of China.

== Recognition ==
In 2012, she was awarded the Legion of Honor for having "contributed to building bridges between France and China, in the economic and legal fields, through her action within the Gide cabinet, but also in the cultural field." In 2018, The House of Yan won the Simone Veil literary award.
