= Liu Xiaotao =

Chinese politician (born 1970)

Liu Xiaotao 刘小涛
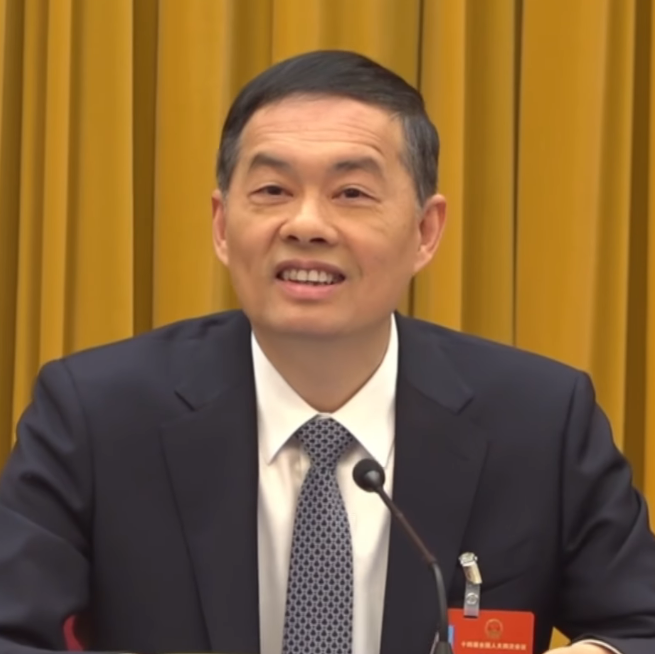
- Liu in March 2026

Governor of Jiangsu
- Incumbent
- Assumed office 9 October 2025; Acting: 9 October 2025 – 14 October 2025
- Party Secretary: Xin Changxing
- Preceded by: Xu Kunlin

Party Secretary of Suzhou
- In office 11 October 2023 – September 2025
- Deputy: Wu Qingwen (Mayor)
- Preceded by: Cao Lubao
- Succeeded by: Fan Bo

Party Secretary of Wenzhou
- In office 30 August 2021 – 11 October 2023
- Deputy: Yao Gaoyuan → Zhang Zhenfeng (Mayor)
- Preceded by: Chen Weijun
- Succeeded by: Zhang Zhenfeng

Vice Governor of Zhejiang
- In office 8 April 2020 – 29 September 2021
- Governor: Yuan Jiajun → Zheng Shanjie

Secretary-General of the People's Government of Guangdong Province
- In office 21 May 2019 – 23 June 2020
- Governor: Ma Xingrui
- Preceded by: Zhang Hu [zh]
- Succeeded by: Ye Niuping

Party Secretary of Chaozhou
- In office 10 June 2017 – 8 May 2019
- Deputy: Yin Zhaoju (Mayor)
- Preceded by: Li Shuihua
- Succeeded by: Li Yalin

Mayor of Shantou
- In office 6 May 2016 – 7 August 2017
- Party Secretary: Chen Liangxian
- Preceded by: Zheng Renhao
- Succeeded by: Zheng Jian'ge

Personal details
- Born: July 1970 (age 56) Xingning, Guangdong, China
- Party: China Communist Party
- Education: Renmin University of China
- Website: Governor of Jiangsu Province

Liu Xiaotao (simplified Chinese: 刘小涛; traditional Chinese: 劉小濤; pinyin: Liú Xiǎotāo, Hakka: Liù Siáu-tho, born July 1970) is a Chinese politician who has served as the governor of Jiangsu since October 2025. A native of Xingning, Guangdong, he worked in Guangdong for 28 years, serving as mayor of Shantou, Communist Party secretary of Chaozhou and secretary-general of the provincial government, before moving to Zhejiang as vice governor in 2020 and party secretary of Wenzhou in 2021. He became party secretary of Suzhou in 2023 and a deputy party secretary of Jiangsu in 2025. At the time of his election as governor, he was one of China's youngest provincial leaders, and the only provincial government head who was not a member of the Communist Party's central bodies.

== Early life and education ==
Liu was born in July 1970 in Xingning, Guangdong. He joined the Chinese Communist Party in December 1991. He graduated in labor economics from the School of Labor and Personnel of Renmin University of China, and began work in July 1992. He later earned a master's degree in economics through part-time postgraduate study.

== Political career ==
=== Guangdong ===
After graduating, Liu joined the Guangdong Provincial Labor Bureau. He worked in the province's labor and social security administration until 2008, rising to deputy director and then director of the general office of the Guangdong Department of Labor and Social Security, and serving in between as director of its division for the socialized management of enterprise retirees. In 2008, he became a deputy director of the Guangdong Provincial Local Taxation Bureau.

In 2012, Liu moved to Maoming as a member of the standing committee of the municipal party committee and vice mayor. In 2014, he became party secretary of Dianbai District, while remaining on the Maoming standing committee. In April 2016, he became acting mayor of Shantou, and he was elected mayor in January 2017. About six months later, in June 2017, he was appointed party secretary of Chaozhou, becoming the first official born in the 1970s to lead the party committee of a prefecture-level city in Guangdong. In May 2019, he was appointed secretary-general of the Guangdong Provincial People's Government.

=== Zhejiang ===
On 8 April 2020, Liu was appointed vice governor of Zhejiang by the standing committee of the provincial people's congress, his first post outside Guangdong. In August 2021, he was appointed to the standing committee of the Zhejiang provincial party committee and named party secretary of Wenzhou, succeeding Chen Weijun, who had been transferred to Xinjiang in May. At 51, he was the youngest member of the provincial standing committee, and the first party secretary of Wenzhou since the 18th Party Congress who had not risen through the ranks in Zhejiang.

=== Jiangsu ===
In October 2023, Liu was transferred to Jiangsu as a member of the standing committee of the provincial party committee and party secretary of Suzhou. In November 2023, he met a delegation of the China-Britain Business Council led by its chair, Sherard Cowper-Coles, and said that Suzhou planned to increase its opening-up and to foster a "market-oriented, law-based, first-class international business environment". At the 2025 Suzhou Global Investment Promotion Conference, at which 417 projects worth a combined 341.57 billion yuan were signed, he said that the city would keep improving trade facilitation and market access, "while fostering a transparent, stable and predictable policy environment". In May 2025, he was promoted to deputy party secretary of Jiangsu, while remaining party secretary of Suzhou.

On 30 September 2025, after the governor, Xu Kunlin, was transferred to Liaoning as its party secretary, the Jiangsu Provincial Party Committee named Liu party secretary of the provincial government. On 9 October, the Standing Committee of the Jiangsu Provincial People's Congress appointed him vice governor and acting governor. On 14 October, the fourth session of the 14th Jiangsu Provincial People's Congress elected him governor by secret ballot, and he took the constitutional oath of office. In his remarks after the vote, he pledged to perform his duties loyally and diligently. Caixin described him as an official with "extensive experience in China's top economic provinces", and reported that he was the sixth official born in the 1970s to reach full provincial-ministerial rank.

In late 2025, the Standing Committee of the Jiangsu Provincial People's Congress elected Liu a deputy to the 14th National People's Congress in a by-election, and the Standing Committee of the National People's Congress confirmed his credentials on 27 December. On 3 February 2026, he delivered the provincial government's work report at the opening of the fifth session of the 14th Jiangsu Provincial People's Congress in Nanjing. In May 2026, he hosted an official dinner for the Governor of Victoria, Australia Margaret Gardner, at which both governors marked 47 years of sister-state ties between Victoria and Jiangsu. In October 2026, Hong Kong's Financial Secretary, Paul Chan, met him in Nanjing, where they discussed deepening cooperation between Hong Kong, Jiangsu and Nanjing.

Government offices
Preceded by Xu Kunlin	Governor of Jiangsu; October 2025 –	Incumbent
Preceded by Zhang Hu [zh]	Secretary-General of the Guangdong Provincial Government; May 2019 – June 2020	Succeeded by Ye Niuping
Preceded by Zheng Renhao	Mayor of Shantou; May 2016 – June 2017	Succeeded by Zheng Jian'ge
Party political offices
Preceded by Shen Ying	Specifically-designated Deputy Party Secretary of Jiangsu; May 2025 – September 2025	Vacant
Preceded by Cao Lubao	Party Secretary of Suzhou; October 2023 – September 2025	Succeeded by Fan Bo
Preceded by Chen Weijun	Party Secretary of Wenzhou; August 2021 – October 2023	Succeeded by Zhang Zhenfeng
Preceded by Li Shuihua	Party Secretary of Chaozhou; June 2017 – May 2019	Succeeded by Li Yalin
