= Party Secretary of Hangzhou =

Government position in China

Secretary of the Hangzhou Municipal Committee of the Chinese Communist Party
- 中国共产党杭州市委员会书记
- Emblem of the Chinese Communist Party

- Flag of the Chinese Communist Party
- Incumbent; Liu Fei since April 18, 2022
- Hangzhou Municipal Committee of the Chinese Communist Party
- Type: Party Committee Secretary
- Status: Deputy provincial and ministerial-level official
- Member of: Hangzhou Municipal Standing Committee
- Seat: Hangzhou
- Nominator: Central Committee
- Appointer: Hangzhou Municipal Committee; Central Committee
- Inaugural holder: Wu Xian
- Formation: 1956
- Deputy: Deputy Secretary; Secretary-General

The secretary of the Hangzhou Municipal Committee of the Chinese Communist Party is the leader of the Hangzhou Municipal Committee of the Chinese Communist Party (CCP). As the CCP is the sole ruling party of the People's Republic of China (PRC), the secretary is the highest ranking post in Hangzhou, which outranks the mayor, conventionally being the deputy secretary of the municipal committee. The secretary is also the leader of the Standing Committee of the Hangzhou Municipal Committee.

The secretary is officially appointed by the CCP Central Committee based on the recommendation of the CCP Organization Department, which is then approved by the Politburo and its Standing Committee.

The current secretary is Liu Fei, who took office on 25 April 2025.

== List of party secretaries ==
No.	English name	Chinese name	Took office	Left office	References
1	Wu Xian	吴宪	June 1956	April 1962	
2	Wang Pingyi	王平夷	April 1962	December 1967	
3	Wang Zida	王子达	October 1970	July 1975	
4	Zhang Zishi	张子石	July 1975	February 1979	
5	Zhang Jingtang	张敬堂	February 1979	June 1981	
6	Chen Anyu	陈安羽	June 1981	April 1983	
7	Li Dexin	厉德馨	April 1983	February 1992	
8	Li Jinming	李金明	February 1992	July 2000	
9	Wang Guoping	王国平	July 2000	January 2010	
10	Huang Kunming	黄坤明	20 January 2010	8 October 2013	
11	Gong Zheng	龚正	8 October 2013	11 August 2015	
12	Zhao Yide	赵一德	25 December 2015	26 March 2018	
13	Zhou Jiangyong	周江勇	14 May 2018	21 August 2021	
14	Liu Jie	刘捷	2 December 2021	December 2024	
15	Liu Fei	刘非	25 April 2025	Incumbent	
