= Li Shulei =

Chinese politician (born 1964)

- 李书磊

Head of the Publicity Department of the Chinese Communist Party
- Incumbent
- Assumed office 26 October 2022
- General Secretary: Xi Jinping
- Preceded by: Huang Kunming

Executive Deputy Head of the Publicity Department of the Chinese Communist Party
- In office April 2022 – 26 October 2022
- Head: Huang Kunming
- Preceded by: Wang Xiaohui
- Succeeded by: Hu Heping

Executive Vice President of the Central Party School of the Chinese Communist Party
- In office 26 December 2020 – April 2022
- President: Chen Xi
- Preceded by: He Yiting
- Succeeded by: Xie Chuntao

Personal details
- Born: January 1964 (age 62) Yuanyang County, Henan, China
- Party: Chinese Communist Party
- Education: Peking University

Chinese name
- Simplified Chinese: 李书磊
- Traditional Chinese: 李書磊
Transcriptions
Standard Mandarin
- Hanyu Pinyin: Lǐ Shūlěi

Li Shulei (Chinese: 李书磊; born 21 January 1964) is a Chinese politician who is the current head of the Publicity Department of the Central Committee of the Chinese Communist Party and a member of the Politburo of the Chinese Communist Party.

Li spent most of his career in academia, before being dispatched for a short stint as head of the Publicity Department in Fujian, then as head of discipline inspection in Beijing. Li also served as the executive vice president of the Central Party School (ministerial level position) and the deputy executive head of the Publicity Department. He is an important advisor to CCP general secretary and paramount leader Xi Jinping.

== Early life and education ==
Li was born in Yuanyang County, Henan province. He entered Peking University in 1978 at the age of 14, studying library sciences. By the time he was 21, he already held a master's degree from Peking University. By age 24, Li earned a doctorate in modern Chinese literature from Peking University.

== Career ==
In December 1989, he was transferred to work in the Central Party School of the Chinese Communist Party. By 1995, Li was named a professor at the party school. He taught literary history. During his tenure as a professor, he wrote essays and critiques on ancient and modern Chinese literature. Between 2001 and 2008, he served on the governing board of the school, serving as the director of the Literary History, Training, and Education Affairs departments.

During this time, he served in two guazhi positions, as the deputy party secretary of Qinglong Manchu Autonomous County, Hebei, and in 2004, as the deputy party secretary of Xi'an. In December 2008, he was named vice president of the Central Party School, ascending to the vice-ministerial rank, and working directly under then-Central Party School president Xi Jinping.

In January 2014, he was named a member of the provincial Party Standing Committee of Fujian, and the head of party propaganda in the province. This was his first provincial tenure. His rise in politics had been compared to that of Wang Huning, another political heavyweight whose career originated in academia. Li supports party leader Xi's philosophy that "the party must guide the arts."

In January 2016, Li was named Secretary of Discipline Inspection Commission of Beijing. In January 2017, Li was named deputy secretary of the Central Commission for Discipline Inspection.

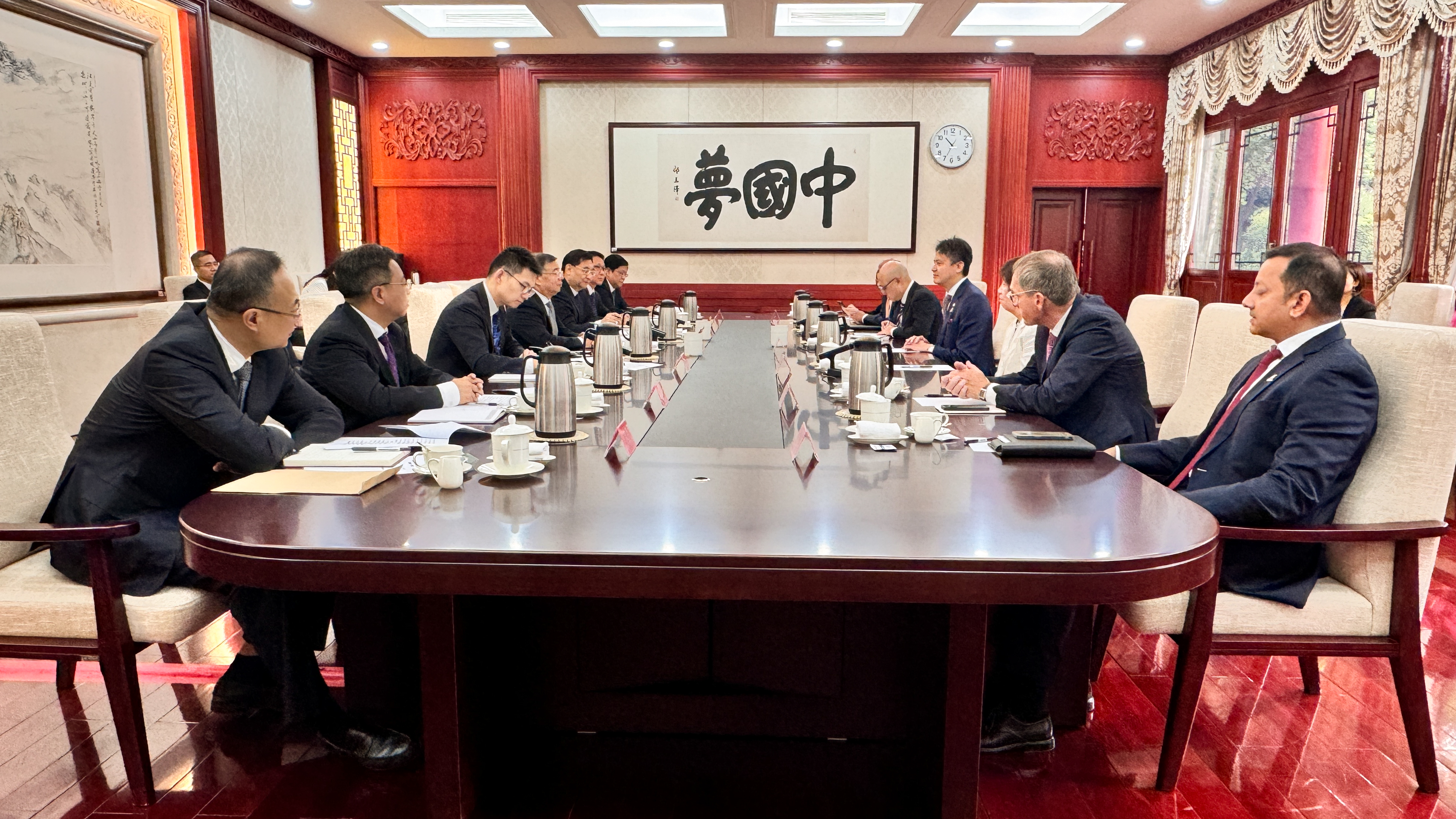
WIPO Director General Daren Tang meets with Li Shulei (fourth, left), September 2024

Li is a member of the 18th and 19th CCP Central Commissions for Discipline Inspection. In 2020, he was appointed as the "vice president in charge of daily work" (ministerial level position) of the Central Party School (Chinese Academy of Governance). In April 2022, he became the executive deputy head of the Publicity Department of the Chinese Communist Party.

=== Head of the Publicity Department ===
After the 20th Party Congress in October 2022, Li became a member of the CCP Politburo and was appointed as the head of the Publicity Department. In November 2022, he attended the World Internet Conference, where he said the "current global internet management system still follows imperfect rules and an unreasonable order".

Order of precedence
Preceded by Zhang Guoqing as Member of the Politburo of the Chinese Communist Party	Order of precedence of China as Member of the Politburo of the Chinese Communist Party	Succeeded by Liu Guozhong as Member of the Politburo of the Chinese Communist Party
