= Ding Guangen =

Chinese politician

- 丁关根

Head of the Publicity Department of the Chinese Communist Party
- In office September 1992 – November 2002
- General Secretary: Jiang Zemin
- Preceded by: Wang Renzhi
- Succeeded by: Liu Yunshan

Head of the United Front Work Department of the Chinese Communist Party
- In office November 1990 – December 1992
- General Secretary: Jiang Zemin
- Preceded by: Yan Mingfu
- Succeeded by: Wang Zhaoguo

Chairman of the Central Guidance Commission on Building Spiritual Civilization
- In office April 1997 – November 2002
- Succeeded by: Li Changchun

Minister of Railways
- In office 1985 – 12 March 1998
- Premier: Zhao Ziyang; Li Peng
- Preceded by: Chen Puru
- Succeeded by: Li Senmao

Personal details
- Born: September 1929 Wuxi, Jiangsu, Republic of China
- Died: July 22, 2012 (aged 82) Beijing, China
- Party: Chinese Communist Party (1956–2002)
- Education: Shanghai Jiao Tong University

Ding Guangen
- Traditional Chinese: 丁關根
- Simplified Chinese: 丁关根
Transcriptions
Standard Mandarin
- Hanyu Pinyin: Dīng Guāngēn

Ding Guangen (Chinese: 丁关根; September 1929 – July 22, 2012) was a Chinese politician who served in senior leadership roles in the Chinese Communist Party during the 1990s. He was a member of the Politburo of the Chinese Communist Party between 1992 and 2002, a member of the Central Secretariat, and one of the top officials in charge of propaganda and ideology during the term of Party General Secretary and President Jiang Zemin.

Prior to his elevation to the Politburo, Ding served successively as Minister of Railways of China between 1985 and 1988, the chief of the Taiwan Affairs Office between 1988 and 1990, and the head of the United Front Work Department of the party between 1990 and 1992.

== Biography ==
Ding was born in September 1929 in Wuxi, Jiangsu province. He attended high school in Shanghai. He graduated from Shanghai Jiao Tong University with a degree in engineering. He joined the Communist Party in July 1956.

Ding was elevated to the Politburo of the Chinese Communist Party (CCP) in 1987, and was expected to take on more prominent posts. However, he was forced to resign due to a series of dire railway accidents in 1988. He was demoted to the vice director of the National Planning Commission. Later, Ding became the director of Taiwan Affairs Office of the State Council. He thus became the first politburo member, i.e., Party and nation's leader, who served as a vice Minister in the government after Cultural Revolution. Ding re-emerged in 1989 and took charge of the United Front Work Department of CCP. Since 1992, Ding had served as the head of Central Propaganda Department of CCP, responsible for ideological affairs for 10 years. He retired in 2002 due to his age.

Ding was a member of 12th, 13th, 14th and 15th Central Committees of the Chinese Communist Party, an alternate member of 13th Politburo, and a full member of 14th and 15th Politburo. Since the 4th plenary session of 13th Central Committee, he was a secretary of Central Secretariat of CCP.

Ding died on July 22, 2012, in Beijing at the age of 83. He was eulogized by the party as a "long-tested fighter of the Communist cause".

Government offices
Preceded by Chen Puru	Minister of Railways; 1985–1988	Succeeded by Li Senmao
Party political offices
Preceded by Wang Renzhi	Head of the Publicity Department of the Chinese Communist Party; 1992–2002	Succeeded by Liu Yunshan
Preceded by Yan Mingfu	Head of the United Front Work Department; 1990–1992	Succeeded by Wang Zhaoguo
