= Zhao Liping (born 1961) =

Chinese politician (born 1961)

Zhao Liping (Chinese: 赵力平, born in April 1961), a native of Liangshan, Shandong, People's Republic of China, is a political figure who has held the positions of Chinese Communist Party Committee Secretary and deputy director of the Standing Committee of the Jiangxi Provincial People's Congress.

== Biography ==
In June 1984, Zhao Liping became a member of the Chinese Communist Party (CCP); in July 1984, graduated from the Chinese Department of Jiangxi Normal University with a major in Chinese language and literature, subsequently remaining in the institution to work. In September 2007, held the position of Secretary of the Municipal Commission for Discipline Inspection and served on the Standing Committee of the Jiangxi Provincial Party Committee in Shangrao City. In October 2011, held the position of Deputy Secretary of the Jiangxi Provincial Commission for Discipline Inspection. In February 2015, held the position of Executive Vice Minister of the Organization Department of the CCP Jiangxi Provincial Committee. In November 2016, he held the position of Minister of the Publicity Department of the Jiangxi Provincial Party Committee and sat on the Standing Committee of the Provincial Committee. In May 2018, he held the position of Secretary General of the Jiangxi Provincial Party Committee Standing Committee and served as the first secretary of the Provincial Organs Working Committee. In January 2021, he held the positions of Secretary General of the CCP Jiangxi Provincial Party Committee, First Secretary of the Provincial Organs Working Committee, and Deputy Director of the Jiangxi Provincial People's Congress Standing Committee. In 2024, he assumed the role of President at Jiangxi University of the Elderly.

Party political offices
Preceded by Liu Jie	Secretary General of the CPC Jiangxi Provincial Committee; 2018–2021	Succeeded by Wu Hao
