= Zhu Houze =

Chinese politician

- 朱厚泽

Head of the Publicity Department of the Chinese Communist Party
- In office August 1985 – February 1987
- General Secretary: Hu Yaobang
- Preceded by: Deng Liqun
- Succeeded by: Wang Renzhi

Party Secretary of Guizhou
- In office April – August 1987
- Preceded by: Chi Biqing
- Succeeded by: Hu Jintao

Personal details
- Born: January 1931 Zhijin County, Guizhou, Republic of China
- Died: 9 May 2010 (aged 79) Beijing
- Party: Chinese Communist Party
- Education: Guiyang Normal College

Zhu Houze (Chinese: 朱厚泽; January 1931 – 9 May 2010) was a Chinese politician most active in the 1980s, best known for his term as head of the Publicity Department of the Chinese Communist Party. As head of the department he presided over a period of liberalism in the Chinese press.

== Biography ==
Zhu was born in Zhijin County, Guizhou province. He joined the Communist Party in 1949, the year the People's Republic of China was founded. He attended Guiyang Normal College. In 1964, during the Socialist Education Movement, Zhu was expelled from the Communist Party and sent to perform manual labour.

Zhu was politically rehabilitated in 1978, then became head of the party organization in Guiyang, then promoted to provincial First Secretary of Guizhou. During his tenure in Guizhou he was known for the significant progress the province made in economic development; the annual increase in industrial output increased by 18%. Zhu's achievements were noted by national leaders such as Hu Yaobang.

In April 1985, Zhu was named Guizhou party chief (top official of the province). In August that year, he was transferred to Beijing to serve as head of the Publicity Department, becoming one of the top deputies of party General Secretary Hu Yaobang. During Zhu's term as Publicity Department head, he spearheaded propaganda policy of "Generous, Tolerant, Relaxed" (宽厚、宽容、宽松), significantly loosening the ideological shackles of the communist state and leading to increased liberalization in the arts and in academic institutions.

However, Zhu's fortunes and the policies he espoused were short-lived. Mirroring the fate of his patron Hu Yaobang, in February 1987 Zhu was dismissed from his propaganda post during the anti-bourgeois liberalization campaign. Though disgraced, he was given a position at the State Council Rural Development Centre; during the 13th Party Congress held in 1987, he failed to secure election to the party's Central Committee; that is, he appeared on the candidate list but did not receive enough votes for confirmation. However, in 1988, reformist general secretary Zhao Ziyang named Zhu the first-ranked vice chairman of the All-China Federation of Trade Unions.

Following the 1989 Tiananmen Square protests and massacre, Zhu was yet again purged for supporting the student movement. He was expelled for the second time in his life from the Chinese Communist Party. He retreated from public view thereafter and died on May 9, 2010, in Beijing.

Party political offices
Preceded by Deng Liqun	Head of the Publicity Department of the Chinese Communist Party; 1985–1987	Succeeded by Wang Renzhi
Preceded by Chi Biqing	Party Secretary of Guizhou Province; 1985	Succeeded by Hu Jintao
