= Huang Kunming =

Chinese politician (born 1956)

- 黄坤明
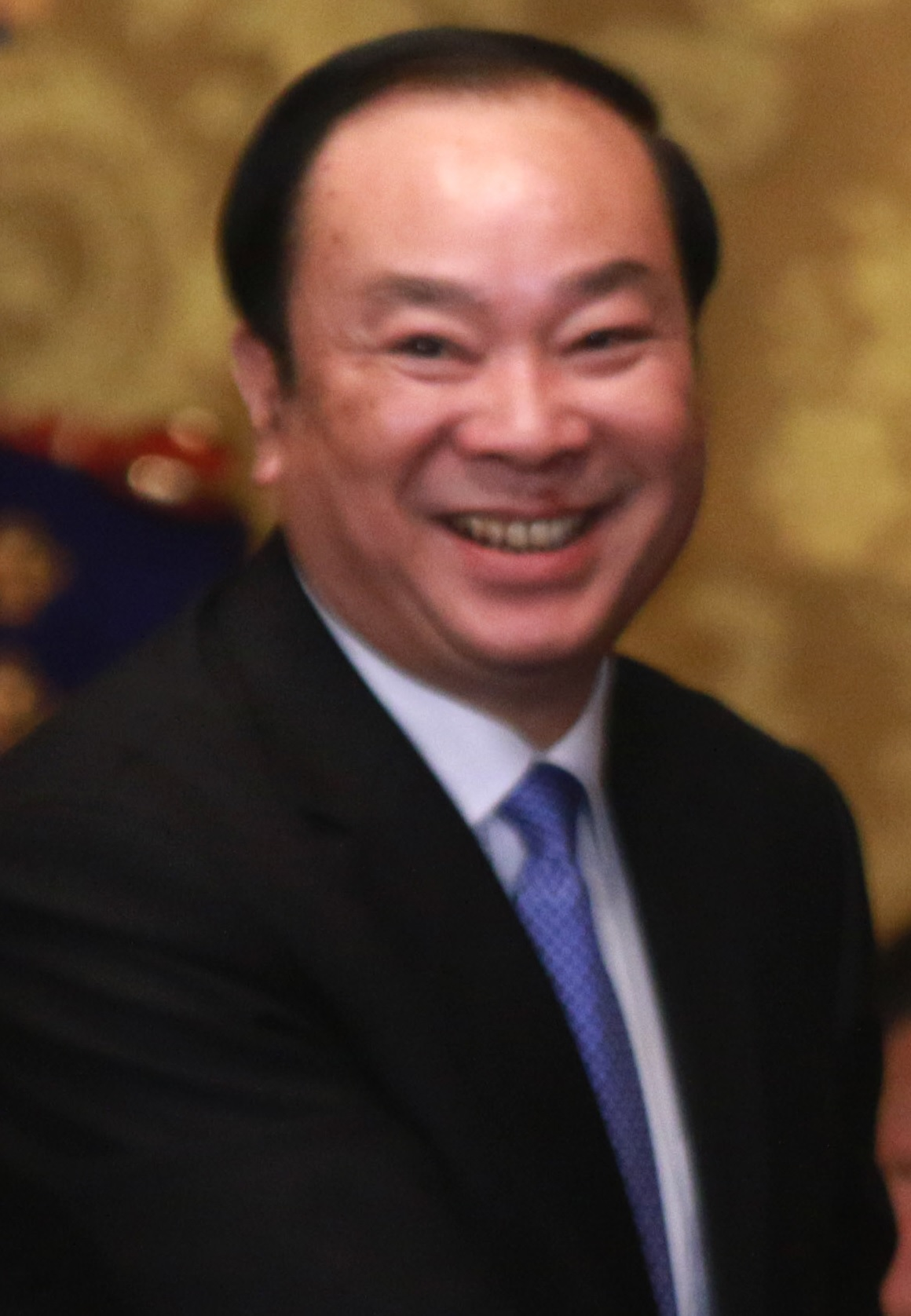
- Huang in 2016

Party Secretary of Guangdong
- Incumbent
- Assumed office 28 October 2022
- Deputy: Meng Fanli (Governor); Feng Zhonghua; Wang Weizhong
- Preceded by: Li Xi

Head of the Publicity Department of the Chinese Communist Party
- In office 30 October 2017 – 26 October 2022
- General Secretary: Xi Jinping
- Preceded by: Liu Qibao
- Succeeded by: Li Shulei

Party Secretary of Hangzhou
- In office 20 January 2010 – 8 October 2013
- Preceded by: Wang Guoping
- Succeeded by: Gong Zheng

Personal details
- Born: November 1956 (age 69–70) Shanghang County, Fujian, China
- Party: Chinese Communist Party
- Education: Fujian Normal University; Tsinghua University

Chinese name
- Simplified Chinese: 黄坤明
- Traditional Chinese: 黃坤明
Transcriptions
Standard Mandarin
- Hanyu Pinyin: Huáng Kūnmíng
Yue: Cantonese
- Jyutping: Wong4 Kwan1-ming4

Huang Kunming (Note: Chinese: 黄坤明; pinyin: Huáng Kūnmíng) (born November 1956) is a Chinese politician, currently serving as the Party secretary of Guangdong and a member of the Politburo of the Chinese Communist Party.

Huang spent most of his early career in Fujian and Zhejiang provinces, and is considered a close associate of Xi Jinping, the current general secretary of the Chinese Communist Party. From 2010 to 2013, he was the Party secretary of Hangzhou. Huang joined the CCP Publicity Department in 2014 as a deputy head, and became its head in 2017. In 2022, Huang became the Party secretary of Guangdong.

== Early life and education ==
Huang was born in Shanghang County, Fujian province, on 15 November 1956. In December 1974, Huang began serving in the People's Liberation Army. Two years later, he joined the Chinese Communist Party (CCP). In 1977, after serving for three years in the army, he went back to Tongxian Commune his home county as a "sent-down youth" and became a secretary. He entered Fujian Normal University in 1978, graduating with a bachelor's degree in politics in 1982.

== Career ==
After graduation, Huang was sent by the party to work in the Longyan region of Fujian in a series of administrative roles. He first worked as a clerk at the Young Cadre Division of the Organization Department of the Longyan Prefecture Party Committee from 1982 to 1988. He enrolled in the Central Party School in 1985, gaining a master's degree in economic management in 1988 via part-time studies. In 1988, he became the deputy director of the Party Committee's General Office, later becoming its director and the deputy secretary-general of Longyan Prefecture in 1991. In 1993, he became the Party Committee Secretary of Yongding County, then in February 1998, following the conversion of the administrative status of Longyan from a Prefecture into a "City", Huang became its mayor and party secretary.

In August 1999, he was sent to the city of Huzhou in neighboring Zhejiang province to serve as mayor. In February 2003, he became party secretary of Jiaxing, a prosperous city on China's east coast. During this time, Xi Jinping was the party secretary of Zhejiang; Huang is believed to have assisted Xi in preparing the "New Thought in Zhejiang" column, which was published in the Zhejiang Daily from 2003 to 2007.

Huang enrolled in the Tsinghua University School of Public Administration in 2005, gaining a doctoral degree in management in 2008 via part-time studies. By June 2007, Huang was named a member of the provincial Party Standing Committee and the head of the provincial party organization's Publicity Department. At around the same time, he earned a Masters of Public Administration from Tsinghua University. In January 2010, Huang was named party secretary of Hangzhou, the provincial capital of Zhejiang province.

=== Publicity Department ===
Huang became an alternate of the 18th Central Committee of the Chinese Communist Party held in the fall of 2012. In October 2013, he was named deputy head of the Central Publicity Department. In December 2014, he was promoted to executive deputy head, with rank equivalent to that of a minister. The executive deputy head position of the Publicity Department is a powerful one, as it oversees roughly all day-to-day administrative aspects of the department. External observers have called Huang's installation in the position as a means to check the influence of Liu Yunshan, a member of the party's top ruling body the Politburo Standing Committee who is widely believed to be a conservative. Huang was also named chief of the Office of the Central Guidance Commission on Building Spiritual Civilization.

The later years of Huang's career roughly follows in the footsteps of Xi Jinping, who was named the CCP General Secretary in 2012. Huang began working with Xi in Fujian province where Xi served as governor. Later Huang moved to Zhejiang during Xi's term as Party Committee Secretary there. After Xi rose to become party leader, Huang again was transferred from Zhejiang to the party center. Because of Huang's close links with Xi, he is considered a member of the New Zhijiang Army, an informal grouping of Xi's closest associates who were considered destined for higher office. After the 19th Party Congress in October 2017, Huang became head of the Publicity Department, and a member of the Politburo of the Chinese Communist Party. Shortly thereafter he also became head of a task force on combating pornography and illegal publications.

He attended the World Internet Conference in Wuzhen, Zhejiang in November 2018, saying each country had the right to take part equally in cyberspace management. In March 2019, Huang spoke at the launch of the Xuexi Qiangguo app, calling it an all-encompassing database of Xi Jinping's thoughts on domestic governance, military building and diplomacy. In May 2019, he called for greater global understanding of the Greater Bay Area project in a media summit in Guangzhou. In October 2019, at the World Internet Conference, Huang criticized "cold war thinking" and saying by using national security as an excuse, "some countries have attacked some countries and enterprises". In November 2021, he called on media to defeat "rumors and prejudice" at the Fourth World Media Summit. In August 2022, he attended an "internet civilization" conference in Tianjin, saying that in the last decade, China's cyber civilization "has achieved noticeable results".

=== Guangdong ===
After the 20th Party Congress in October 2022, Huang was reappointed as a member of the Politburo. He was appointed as the Party Secretary of Guangdong on 28 October 2022. In February 2023, Huang called for a further development of the Greater Bay Area project, also calling on young people from Hong Kong to participate.

Amid floods in Shenzhen, Huang held a video conference in Zhongshan, urging officials to supervise flood defense and emergency rescue efforts. In September 2023, he chaired Guangdong's provincial party committee's study group session in October 2023, and called former CCP official Xi Zhongxun an "outstanding member of our party, a great communist fighter and an outstanding proletarian revolutionist". In February 2024, Huang held a provincial high-quality conference in Shenzhen, emphasizing scientific innovation and high-quality development. In April 2024, Huang visited Shaoguan City amidst floods in Guangdong.

== Personal life ==
Huang is married to Qiu Ping, who served as the director of the Tobacco Monopoly Bureau of Zhejiang before her retirement. They have one daughter.

== Notes ==
Party political offices
Preceded by Chen Jiayuan	Party Secretary of Jiaxing; 2003–2007	Succeeded by Chen Derong
Preceded by Chen Min'er	Head of Publicity Department of Zhejiang Provincial Committee of the Chinese Communist Party; 2007–2010	Succeeded by Mao Linsheng
Preceded by Wang Guoping	Party Secretary of Hangzhou; 2010–2013	Succeeded by Gong Zheng
Preceded by Luo Shugang	Executive Deputy Head of the Publicity Department of the Chinese Communist Party; 2014–2017	Succeeded by Wang Xiaohui
Preceded by Liu Qibao	Head of the Publicity Department of the Chinese Communist Party; 2017–2022	Succeeded by Li Shulei
Preceded by Li Xi	Party Secretary of Guangdong; 2022–	Incumbent
Order of precedence
Preceded by Han Zheng as Vice President	Order of precedence of China as Member of the Politburo of the Chinese Communist Party	Succeeded by Li Hongzhong as Member of the Politburo of the Chinese Communist Party
