= Yu Donglai =

Chinese businessman, founder of Pangdonglai

Yu Donglai (Simplified Chinese: 于东来; born 1966) is a Chinese entrepreneur and businessman. He is known for being the founder, chairman and CEO of the retail chain Pangdonglai.

== Career ==
In 1995, with the help of his brother-in-law and sister-in-law, he rented a small, roughly 40 m² shop in Xuchang, originally dealing in tobacco, alcohol, and daily-use goods.

=== Establishment of Pangdonglai ===
In August 1997, Yu Donglai renamed his store to "Pangdonglai Tobacco and Alcohol Co., Ltd. (胖东来烟酒有限公司)". Under Yu’s tenure, Pangdonglai evolved and diversified into supermarkets, with a wider product assortment beyond tobacco and alcohol.

From 2000, Yu Donglai distributed company shares to employees, retaining only 10% for himself. In 2006, Pangdonglai opened a branch in Xinxiang. As of 2022, Pangdonglai has more than 30 chain stores in Henan Province, and has developed its own brand system and online sales platform. As of January, the retailer employed about 8,300 workers, with an average monthly salary of 9,000 yuan, according to the company.

=== “Unhappy Leave” Policy ===
One of Yu’s most notable initiatives is granting staff what he calls “unhappy leave”. In 2024 at the China Supermarket Week forum in late March, he announced that employees of Pangdonglai would be entitled to 10 extra discretionary leave days (on top of annual leave) to take time off when they do not feel mentally or emotionally well.

== Early life and education ==
Yu Donglai was born in 1966 in the city of Xuchang, Henan Province.

Yu graduated from Xuchang No. 7 Middle School. Before founding his business, he had worked various jobs including scalping movie tickets, selling peanuts, and ice pops. In 1984, he started working at a rubber factory, but lost his job when the factory closed down.
