= Head of the Publicity Department of the Chinese Communist Party =

Chinese Communist Party position

Head of the Publicity Department of the Central Committee of the Chinese Communist Party
- 中国共产党中央委员会宣傳部部长
- Emblem of the Chinese Communist Party

- Flag of the Chinese Communist Party
- Incumbent; Li Shulei since October 26, 2022
- Publicity Department of the Chinese Communist Party
- Type: Department Head
- Status: Provincial and ministerial-level official
- Seat: Beijing
- Nominator: Central Committee
- Appointer: Central Committee
- Inaugural holder: Li Da
- Formation: August 1921
- Deputy: Deputy Head

The head of the Publicity Department of the Central Committee of the Chinese Communist Party is the leader of the Publicity Department, a department of the Central Committee of the Chinese Communist Party (CCP).

The current head of the Publicity Department is Li Shulei, who is also a member of the Politburo of the Chinese Communist Party.

== List of heads ==
Name	Start	End	Notes	Ref.
Li Da	August 1921	July 1922	First propaganda chief of the CCP	
Cai Hesen	August 1922	June 1923	Propaganda chief of the 2nd Central Executive Committee	
Luo Zhanglong	May 1924	January 1925	Propaganda chief of the 3rd Central Executive Committee	
Peng Shuzhi	February 1925	March 1927	Director of propaganda	
Cai Hesen	April 1927	October 1927	Acting propaganda chief of the 5th Politburo	
Luo Qiyuan	November 1927	June 1928		
Cai Hesen	July 1928	October 1928		
Li Lisan	November 1928	December 1930	First head of the Central Propaganda Department	
Shen Zemin	January 1931	April 1931		
Zhang Wentian	April 1931	December 1934		
Wu Liangping	January 1935	July 1937		
Zhang Wentian	July 1937	December 1942		
Lu Dingyi	January 1943	December 1952	Head of the "Central Propaganda Commission" from 1943 to 1945	
Xi Zhongxun	January 1953	July 1954		
Lu Dingyi	July 1954	May 1966		
Tao Zhu	May 1966	January 1967		
Wang Li	January 1967	January 1968		
Interregnum (Note: The Propaganda Department was disbanded during the Cultural Revolution and it was replaced by units under the Cultural Revolution Group, the Gang of Four and Kang Sheng.)				
Kang Sheng	November 1970	December 1975	Head of the Central Organization and Propaganda Leading Group	
Yao Wenyuan	January 1976	October 1976		
Geng Biao	October 1976	October 1977	As head of the Central Propaganda Group	
Zhang Pinghua	October 1977	December 1978		
Hu Yaobang	25 December 1978	12 March 1980		
Wang Renzhong	12 March 1980	April 1982		
Deng Liqun	April 1982	August 1985		
Zhu Houze	August 1985	February 1987		
Wang Renzhi	February 1987	December 1992		
Ding Guangen	December 1992	October 2002		
Liu Yunshan	24 October 2002	21 November 2012		
Liu Qibao	21 November 2012	30 October 2017		
Huang Kunming	30 October 2017	26 October 2022		
Li Shulei	26 October 2022	Incumbent		

== Executive deputy heads ==
- Hu Qiaomu (March 1950–December 1954)
- Zhang Jichun (December 1954–November 1956)
- Zhang Ziyi (November 1956–May 1966)
- Xiong Fu (June 1966–December 1966)
- Yu Wen (1982–October 1989)
- Xu Weicheng (October 1989–September 1992)
- Zheng Bijian (September 1992–November 1992)
- Liu Yunshan (April 1993–October 2002)
- Gong Xinhan (1993–2006)
- Ji Bingxuan (April 2003–April 2008)
- Luo Shugang (June 2008–December 2014)
- Huang Kunming (December 2014–October 2017)
- Wang Xiaohui (January 2018–April 2022)
- Li Shulei (April 2022–October 2022)
- Hu Heping (March 2023–present)
