= Yinzhou District =

Yinzhou District may refer to the following locations in China:

- Yinzhou District, Tieling (银州区), Liaoning
- Yinzhou District, Ningbo (鄞州区), Zhejiang
