= Wei Hongguang =

Chinese politician (born 1961)

- 魏宏广

Party Branch Secretary of Guangdong Development and Reform Commission
- In office March 2017 – May 2018
- Preceded by: He Ningka
- Succeeded by: Ge Changwei

Communist Party Secretary of Zhanjiang
- In office March 2016 – March 2017
- Preceded by: Liu Xiaohua
- Succeeded by: Zheng Renhao

Communist Party Secretary of Yangjiang
- In office September 2012 – March 2016
- Preceded by: Lin Shaochun
- Succeeded by: Chen Xiaoshan

Mayor of Yangjiang
- In office February 2008 – September 2012
- Preceded by: Lin Shaochun
- Succeeded by: Qiu Zhiyong

Personal details
- Born: October 1961 (age 64–65) Zhongshan, Guangdong, China
- Party: Chinese Communist Party (expelled; 1984–2021)
- Education: South China Normal University; Central Party School of the Chinese Communist Party

Chinese name
- Traditional Chinese: 魏宏廣
- Simplified Chinese: 魏宏广
Transcriptions
Standard Mandarin
- Hanyu Pinyin: Wèi Hóngguǎng

Wei Hongguang (Chinese: 魏宏广; born October 1961) is a former Chinese politician who spent his whole career in his home-province Guangdong. He was investigated by the Chinese Communist Party's anti-graft agency in January 2020. Previously he served as deputy secretary-general of Guangdong. He entered the workforce in July 1981, and joined the Chinese Communist Party (CCP) in March 1984.

== Biography ==
Wei was born in Zhongshan, Guangdong, China in October 1961. In September 1978 he entered Guangdong Agricultural Machinery Technology School, where he graduated in July 1983. After graduation, he was assigned to Zhongshan Municipal Committee of the Communist Youth League, becoming its deputy secretary in March 1984 and secretary in June 1985. He was Communist Party Secretary of Tanzhou in March 1993, and held that office until August 1996. Then he was promoted to Secretary of Zhongshan Municipal Commission for Discipline Inspection and then Deputy Communist Party Secretary of Zhongshan. In February 2000 he was transferred to Zhuhai and appointed Deputy Communist Party Secretary and Secretary of the Municipal Commission for Discipline Inspection there. In February 2008 he became Deputy Communist Party Secretary of Yangjiang, rising to Communist Party Secretary in September 2012. In March 2016 he was transferred to Zhanjiang and appointed Communist Party Secretary and chairman of the Standing Committee of Zhanjiang Municipal People's Congress. He became Party Branch Secretary of Guangdong Provincial Development and Reform Commission in March 2017, and served until May 2018, when he was appointed deputy secretary-general of Guangdong.

He was a delegate to the 19th National Congress of the Chinese Communist Party.

== Investigation ==
On January 11, 2020, he was placed under investigation by the Central Commission for Discipline Inspection, the party's internal disciplinary body, and the National Supervisory Commission, the highest anti-corruption agency of the People's Republic of China, for "serious violations of regulations and laws".

On January 14, 2021, he was expelled from the CCP and dismissed from public office.

Government offices
Preceded by Lin Shaochun (林少春)	Mayor of Yangjiang; 2008–2012	Succeeded by Qiu Zhiyong (丘志勇)
Party political offices
Preceded by Lin Shaochun (林少春)	Communist Party Secretary of Yangjiang; 2012–2016	Succeeded by Chen Xiaoshan (陈小山)
Preceded by Liu Xiaohua (刘小华)	Communist Party Secretary of Zhanjiang; 2016–2017	Succeeded by Zheng Renhao (郑人豪)
Preceded by He Ningka (何宁卡)	Party Branch Secretary of Guangdong Development and Reform Commission; 2017–2018	Succeeded by Ge Changwei (葛长伟)
