= Beijing Huiwen Middle School =

- 北京汇文中学

Location
- No. 6 Peixin Street; Dongcheng, Beijing 100061; China
- Coordinates: 39°53′24″N 116°25′43″E

Information
- Former name: Peking Academy
- Type: Public
- Principal: Guo Jie (郭杰)
- Website: www.huiwen.edu.cn

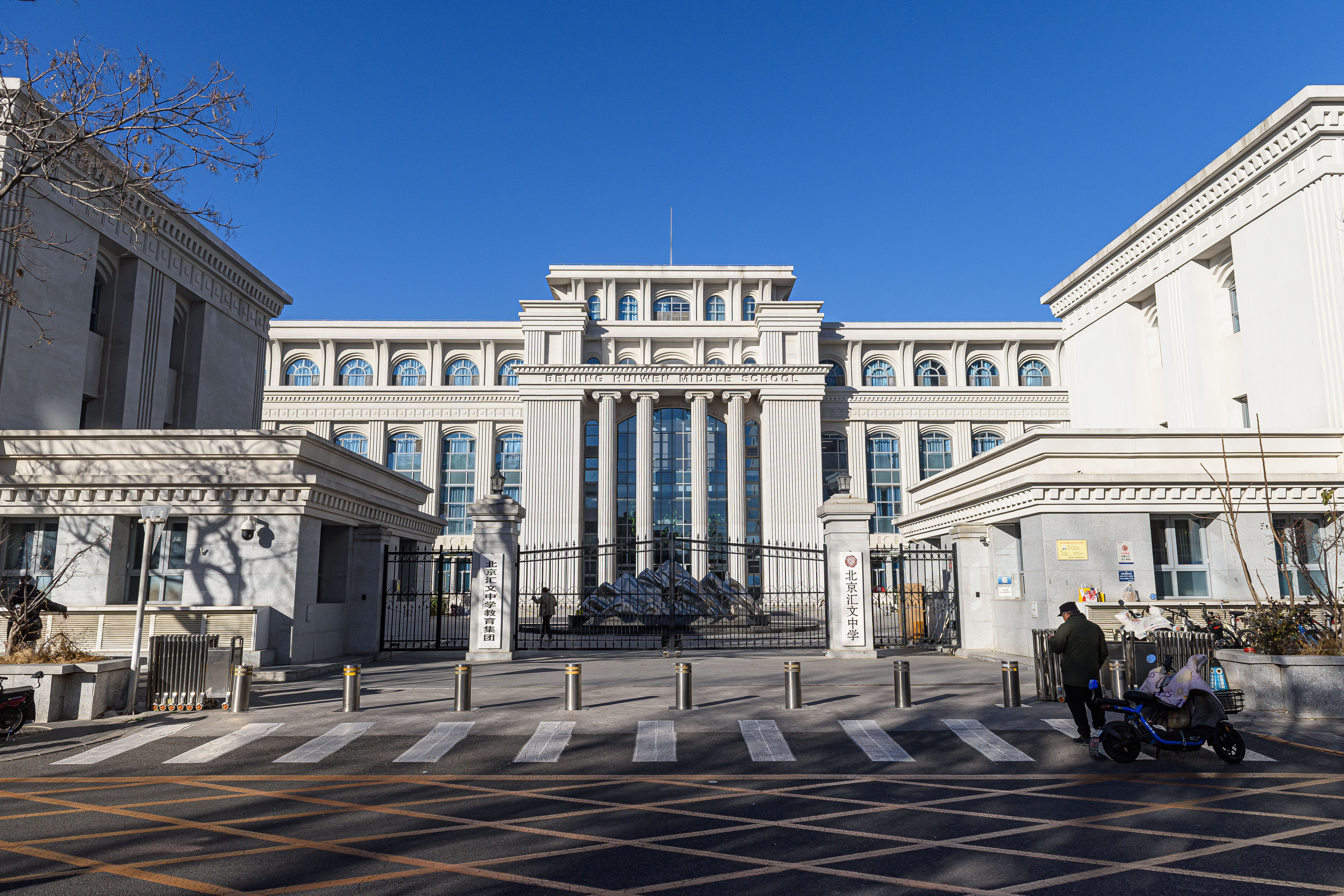
Main campus

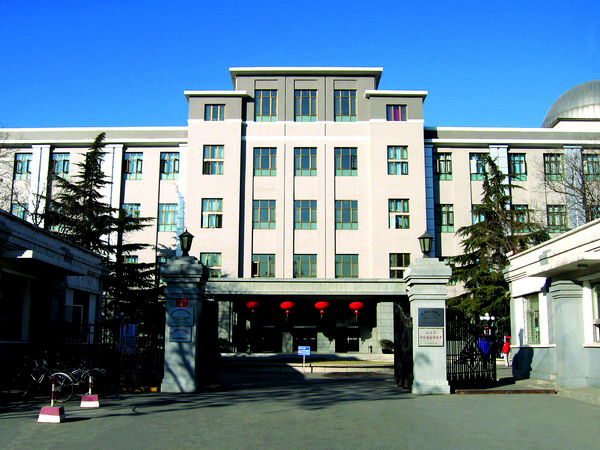
Façade of Huiwen Middle School prior to major renovation in 2014

Beijing Huiwen Middle School (Chinese: 北京汇文中学), formerly known as Peking Academy, is a public secondary school in Dongcheng, Beijing, China. The school is supervised by the Beijing City Dongcheng District Education Committee.
