= Deng Liqun =

Chinese politician (1915–2015)

- 鄧力群
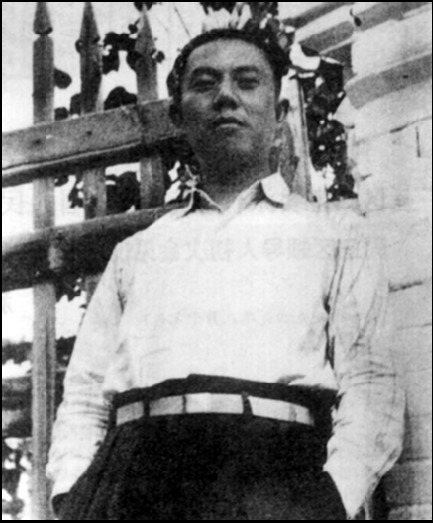
- Deng Liqun in Yining, Xinjiang, August 1949

Head of the Publicity Department of the Chinese Communist Party
- In office April 1982 – August 1985
- Preceded by: Wang Renzhong
- Succeeded by: Zhu Houze

Personal details
- Born: November 27, 1915 Guidong, Hunan, China
- Died: February 10, 2015 (aged 99) Beijing, China
- Party: Chinese Communist Party
- Spouse: Luo Liyun
- Children: Deng Yingtao
- Education: Peking University

Deng Liqun
- Traditional Chinese: 鄧力群
- Simplified Chinese: 邓力群
Transcriptions
Standard Mandarin
- Hanyu Pinyin: Dèng Lìqún
- Wade–Giles: Teng Li-Ch'un

Deng Liqun (November 27, 1915 – February 10, 2015) was a Chinese politician and theorist who was one of the leading figures of the Chinese Communist Party (CCP) during the 1980s, most well known for his involvement with the party's propaganda work. Deng was born in Guidong County, Hunan province, and joined the CCP in 1936. He came from an intellectual family and joined the party out of intellectual commitment. He was often referred to as "Little Deng", to be distinguished from Deng Xiaoping (no relation), the "Old Deng".

Purged during the Cultural Revolution, Deng emerged in the 1980s as one of the most vocal members of the hardline wing of the party in the lead-up of the 1989 Tiananmen Square protests and massacre. He advocated for the orthodox Communist-style planned economy and spoke out against the reform and opening up and political liberalization. He retreated from active politics in 1987, after failing to secure enough internal support to gain a seat on the CCP Politburo, which was partly attributed to his hardline ideological stance, but continued to agitate for the hardline line.

== Early life and education ==
Deng Liqun was born into a wealthy land-owning family in Guidong County, Hunan province, in 1915. His father passed the imperial civil service examination, but never became an official, instead opening the first Western-style school in the county. Deng's elder brother became the chairman of the Nationalist provincial government. Deng went to Beiping (today Beijing) in 1935, enrolling first at the Peking Academy, then entered Peking University a year later, where he studied economics and became a devoted student activist. He took part in the December 9th Movement. He left college that year for Yan'an, Shaanxi, the wartime de facto center of the CCP, to join the party and follow Mao.

== Political career ==
=== Mao era ===
During the 1950s, Deng assisted Wang Zhen in quelling resistance to CCP rule in Xinjiang. Deng played a major role in the suppression of local rebellions and in enacting land reforms in the vast western region. However, officials of the CCP's Northwest Bureau became alarmed at the breakneck pace of the reforms and the extent to which violence and other means of coercion were used as a means to solidify the party's hold on power. Seeing the situation unfold, Mao removed both Wang Zhen and Deng Liqun from their positions in Xinjiang for fear that their tactics may alienate ethnic minorities, particularly Tibetan religious leaders, who were reluctant to embrace rule by the CCP.

Later, Deng returned to Beijing to serve as secretary to President Liu Shaoqi, and the deputy chief editor of the party's theory publication Red Flag. Deng was purged during the Cultural Revolution as a "capitalist roader" because he was Liu Shaoqi's secretary. He went through interrogation in Shijiazhuang. He was politically rehabilitated in 1974, serving on the State Council's political research office under Deng Xiaoping.

=== During reform and opening up ===
As the post-Mao CCP liberalized and embraced market-oriented economic reforms, Deng became one of its most outspoken critics. While Deng Liqun was not fond of Mao-era political fanaticism and rural collectivization policies and was a supporter of Deng Xiaoping in the latter days of the Cultural Revolution, he believed that the party under Deng Xiaoping had strayed too far from orthodox Marxist–Leninist ideals and attempted to tighten control over ideology. Deng Liqun was among the Chinese leadership who contended that Reform and Opening Up made China more susceptible to the Western peaceful evolution strategy.

In 1975, Deng Liqun was assigned as a senior member of the Party Research Office, subsequently the Political Research Office (predecessor of the Central Policy Research Office) in the State Council, along with Hu Qiaomu, Yu Guangyuan, Wu Lengxi, Hu Sheng, Xiong Fu and Li Xin. "When Deng Xiaoping returned to power in 1977, Deng Liqun joined him and drafted some of Deng Xiaoping's speeches." Deng later took on a series of offices which solidified his role as a leading CCP theorist of the post-Mao era, including the head of the Policy Research Office of the Central Secretariat from 1979. Deng Liqun was vice-president of the Chinese Academy of Social Sciences between 1978 and 1980. In these roles, Deng "provided crucial resources for the founding of the Rural Development Group."

Deng mobilized internal opposition to liberal reforms in the early 1980s through his position as chief of propaganda and ideology. Within the circle of Deng-era intelligentsia, Deng is known to the spokesperson of the conservative Left, in a fierce rivalry with the more liberal-minded Yu Guangyuan, who drafted Deng Xiaoping's Third Plenum Speech on reform and opening-up, and a prominent ally of Hu Yaobang. As a result of Deng Liqun's interventions, while market forces were being unleashed on the economy and the government began courting foreign investment, the ideological realm of the country continued to maintain a conservative tone, especially in its wariness to embrace Western-style ideas. He was head of the Propaganda Department of the Chinese Communist Party from 1982 to 1985. On 4 June 1983, during a speech at the Central Party School, Deng criticized concepts increasingly popular in China such as "alienation" and "humanism", and called on Party cadres to "eliminate spiritual pollution". He continued by saying while some people opposed the "Four Cardinal Principles" (the principles of upholding the socialist path, the people's democratic dictatorship, the leadership of the CCP, and Marxism–Leninism and Mao Zedong Thought) outright, others were more discreet, bringing ideas from the West and labeling them as "new". He continued by saying "All of our comrades engaged in propaganda work have a responsibility to adopt a Marxist–Leninist attitude, carefully analyze all kinds of erroneous trends of thought, and work hard to eliminate spiritual pollution".

With his speech, Deng Liqun effectively gave rise to the term "spiritual pollution" in Chinese politics. In another speech, Deng denounced "spiritual pollution in all ideological fields" and asserted improvements in "material civilization" required accompanying developments in "spiritual civilization". After Deng Xiaoping launched the campaign against spiritual pollution by calling for "spiritual civilization" to be "cleaned up" (清理) in a speech in October, Deng Liqun took a harsher line, calling for it to be "eliminated" (清除). Deng Liqun's line quickly became dominant throughout state media, causing an intensification of the campaign in social, political and ideological fronts. During the campaign, Deng Liqun has been described as "the conservatives' primary hatchet man", reportedly stemming from his antipathy to General Secretary Hu Yaobang, the party's leading reformist at the time. International coverage of the excesses of the campaign soon worried the Party leaders, and Party General Secretary Zhao Ziyang soon moved to limit the campaign into the ideological front, shielding from the economic reforms. Under pressure, Deng Liqun quickly accepted the limits, later delivering a speech on 7 December that the campaign was long-term and less about "men growing beards, or women perming their hair, high-heeled shoes, and lipstick" and more about "a spirit of bitter struggle".

Conservative forces began taking hold of the party in the late 1980s, and following what was characterized as Hu Yaobang's mishandling of the student protests of 1986, Hu was forced to resign from his post of General Secretary in January 1987. Deng Liqun was instrumental in the ouster of Hu. After Hu was ousted from power, Deng Liqun was touted as a potential successor to Hu for the office of General Secretary. Deng's candidacy was supported by conservative stalwarts such as Chen Yun and Li Xiannian, as well as his former patron Wang Zhen. However, Deng Xiaoping, who held paramount power in China at the time, grew increasingly alarmed at Deng Liqun's unyielding stance on ideological issues.

Deng Xiaoping's chief protégé Zhao Ziyang, then serving as Premier, vehemently opposed Deng Liqun's assuming the party's top office. Indeed, Zhao, who was initially reluctant to become General Secretary, later remarked that fear of an ideological hardliner like Deng Liqun assuming the post made him (Zhao) more determined to take on the office himself. Zhao passed along a letter to Deng Xiaoping from elder Li Rui, who accused Deng Liqun of improprieties during his time in Yan'an decades earlier. Giving him a pretext for action, Deng Xiaoping summoned the top leaders to his home — including Zhao, Yang Shangkun, Wan Li, Bo Yibo and Hu Qili — and announced his decision to remove Deng Liqun of all his political positions. However, Deng Xiaoping conceded to Deng Liqun's conservative supporters by offering the younger Deng a seat on the Politburo as to "open a channel to allow him to air his views," so long as Deng Liqun relinquished control of the ideological realm.

Deng Liqun's Secretariat Policy Research Office was consequently disbanded, and much of his propaganda duties transitioned to Hu Qili and a newly formed Central Leading Group for Propaganda and Ideology. At the 13th Party Congress, Deng Liqun was tapped to replace another conservative, Hu Qiaomu, on the Politburo. However, during elections for the 13th Central Committee, Deng reportedly received the lowest vote total of any candidate, and under new election procedures in which there were more candidates than positions, was not even elected to the 175-member Central Committee, making him ineligible for the Politburo position. He instead joined the Central Advisory Commission. According to Zhao Ziyang's memoirs, Chen Yun intervened to safeguard Deng's salary and other compensation following his loss in the election, benefits that continued until his death.

== Retirement ==
Following his failure to get elected to the Politburo, Deng retreated from active politics. Deng said the failure to get elected caused him great embarrassment. However, Deng continued to agitate for hardline causes through his writing and personal influence. Many of his former subordinates in the Policy Research Office were later promoted to ministerial-level positions across the party and government apparatus, increasing conservative influence in the new generation of leadership under Jiang Zemin. Deng understood the 1989 Tiananmen Square protests and massacre as a vindication of his beliefs – that the contradiction between economic liberalization on the one hand and rigid political control on the other caused an inevitable rupture of public sentiment, and that the solution was to roll back economic reforms.

After Tiananmen incident, Deng maintained his hardline stance, and became increasingly critical of the reformist wing of the party, accusing them of pursuing an essentially capitalist line. He railed against trends towards "bourgeois liberalization" and advocated for "people's democratic dictatorship." During Deng Xiaoping's southern tour of 1992, which called for increased economic liberalization, Deng Liqun hit back at the Party establishment with an article entitled "Uphold the Dictatorship of the Proletariat." Deng was also one of the foremost critics of the "Peaceful Evolution theory," the idea that the spread of liberal democratic culture and ideas seen in Western countries will lead to the peaceful and gradual dismantling of the CCP power structure in China. Beginning in 1997, Deng Liqun became increasingly critical of the leadership of Jiang Zemin. In 2001, the 85-year-old Deng published an open letter denouncing the Three Represents, Jiang's theoretical contribution to CCP ideology which essentially allowed private businesspeople to join the CCP.

In October 2005, Deng published an autobiographical work entitled Twelve Years (1975-1987) in limited circulation in Hong Kong, which recounted his role in the major political events during that period. In reviewing the book, dissident journalist Gao Yu accused him of glorifying himself at the expense of Hu Yaobang and Zhao Ziyang. Despite their erstwhile political rivalry, Deng sent wreaths to mourn the death of both Hu Yaobang and Zhao Ziyang. In August 2014, Deng made a rare public statement in a letter to the Xinjiang Party Committee commemorating five Uyghurs who died in a plane crash in 1949 en route to Beijing.

== Legacy ==
Deng has been called the "King of the Left", as well as the "master of the pen" by external observers, due to his writing abilities and unyielding support for "puritan" Marxist–Leninist and Maoist principles. His belief that "the post-Mao CCP had fundamentally departed from Communism" continues to be cited by leftist and Maoist groups well into the 21st century, experiencing a mild but officially-tolerated resurgence during the ideological tightening of the Xi Jinping years. When he died, Deng was eulogized with the standard line of "long-tested and loyal fighter of the Communist cause, proletarian revolutionary" by the authorities, but was also unusually designated "an outstanding leader in the front lines of ideology, thought, and propaganda and a Marxist theoretician."

== Personal life ==
Deng was known to be married twice; his second marriage was to Luo Liyun, with whom he had a son and a daughter. Deng's son, Deng Yingtao (邓英淘), was a member of the Rural Development Group, a group of intellectuals who discussed Chinese rural development issues, in the early 1980s. Deng Liqun outlived his son, who died in March 2012 after an illness. Luo Liyun died in 2011. Deng also had two daughters from an earlier marriage which ended in divorce. After being bedridden due to illness for a few years, Deng Liqun died on February 10, 2015, in Beijing.

During the Yan'an Rectification Movement, party member Li Rui (later Mao's Secretary and a deputy head of the party's Organization Department) was detained to "rectify his mistakes". During Li's time in detention, Deng was said to be sexually involved with Li Rui's wife. As a consequence, Li Rui and his wife divorced after Li was proved innocent and released, despite the latter's confession of the mistake. Li recalled the event almost fifty years later in a letter to Zhao Ziyang in which Li accused Deng of "moral impropriety", during Deng's putative candidacy for the General Secretary office in 1987, in a plea against Deng's assuming higher office.

Party political offices
Preceded by Wang Renzhong	Head of the Publicity Department of the Chinese Communist Party; 1982–1985	Succeeded by Zhu Houze
