= Cong Wenjing =

Chinese politician

- 从文景

Mayor of Xinyu
- In office 23 September 2013 – November 2014
- Preceded by: Liu Jie
- Succeeded by: Dong Xiaojian

Personal details
- Born: December 1962 (age 63) Fengtai County, Anhui, China
- Party: Chinese Communist Party
- Education: Wuhan University

Chinese name
- Traditional Chinese: 從文景
- Simplified Chinese: 从文景
Transcriptions
Standard Mandarin
- Hanyu Pinyin: Cóng Wénjǐng

Cong Wenjing (born December 1962) is a former Chinese politician who spent most of his career in Jiangxi. As of November 2014 he was under investigation by the Communist Party's anti-corruption agency. Previously he served as the mayor of Xinyu.

Chinese media reported that he had close relations with Su Rong, who was one of the vice-chairmen of the Chinese People's Political Consultative Conference (CPPCC).

== Life and career ==
Cong was born and raised in Fengtai County, Anhui. He earned a Master of Engineering degree from Wuhan University.

Cong is a member of the Chinese Communist Party, he entered the workforce in August 1983. He worked in a factory before teaching school as a physical education teacher.

In July 2001 he became the vice-mayor of Jingdezhen, he remained in that position until June 2004, when he was transferred to Xinyu and appointed the head of Propaganda Department of Xinyu Municipal Party Committee and a standing committee of Xinyu Municipal committee of the CPC. In January 2006, he served as secretary of the Xinyu Municipal Politics and Law Commission, then he was promoted to deputy party chief in July 2010. In August 2013, he was appointed the vice-mayor and acting mayor of Xinyu, he became the mayor on September 23, 2013.

On November 29, 2014, he was being investigated by the Party's internal disciplinary body for "serious violations of laws and regulations".

Government offices
Preceded by Liu Jie	Mayor of Xinyu; 2013–2014	Succeeded by Dong Xiaojian
