= Generations of Chinese leadership =

Historical periods for the Chinese Communist Party and military officials

- Simplified Chinese: 中国共产党领导集体
- Traditional Chinese: 中國共産黨領導集體
- Literal meaning: Leadership collectives of the Chinese Communist Party
Transcriptions
Standard Mandarin
- Hanyu Pinyin: Zhōngguó Gòngchǎndǎng lǐngdǎo jítǐ

Generations of Chinese leadership is a term historians use to characterize distinct periods of Chinese Communist Party (CCP) leadership and, by extension, successive changes in CCP ideology. Historians have studied various periods in the development of the government of the People's Republic of China (PRC) by reference to these "generations".

== Origins and terminology ==
Shortly after the 1989 Tiananmen Square protests and massacre, Deng Xiaoping gave a speech which referred to Mao Zedong, himself, and Jiang Zemin as the respective "core" of the first, second, and third generations of leadership. This method of dividing Chinese leadership generations became popular. Political scientist Joseph Fewsmith says that this division "distorts history" as Mao and Deng belonged to the same generation, both being veterans of the Chinese Civil War, and that Jiang could be regarded as being from the second generation.

The closest equivalent to the term "leadership generation" used officially in China is "leadership collective" (for example: "first generation leadership collective"). The collective is viewed as leaders of the party (the CCP) rather than of the state (the PRC). Deng used the term "core" to legitimize Jiang's unexpected appointment to general secretary and to emphasize the collective nature of the leadership; Frederick Teiwes says that Deng's application of the concept of collective leadership to the first and second generations was historically inaccurate.

Transitions between generations and core leaders is not always clear when authority is divided across generations. When Jiang became General Secretary in 1989, Deng - through enormous prestige - continued to hold unchallenged ultimate authority. Jiang, in turn, remained chairman of the Central Military Commission after being succeeded as General Secretary by "fourth" generation" Hu Jintao. Official generational labels are not always used. The term "fourth generation of leaders" stopped being used officially in the summer of 2002 shortly before that generation assumed power. Similarly, "fifth generation of leaders" was not used officially through 2003.

The party leader (the General Secretary, and formerly Chairman) leads the collective, which typically includes the Politburo Standing Committee.

Generations of Chinese leadership
Generation	Paramount leader	Start	End	Ideology raised
First	Mao Zedong; Hua Guofeng	1949	1978	Mao Zedong Thought Two Whatevers
Second	Deng Xiaoping	1978	1989	Deng Xiaoping Theory
Third	Jiang Zemin	1989	2002	Three Represents
Fourth	Hu Jintao	2002	2012	Scientific Outlook on Development
Fifth	Xi Jinping	2012		Xi Jinping Thought

== First generation ==
The first generation was drawn from the veterans of the revolutionary period, where most had either worked closely with or been in the armed forces. The close relationships and shared political-military experience made it easy for civilian leaders to intervene in military matters and vice versa, so the line between civilian and military leader was blurred even as greater specialization evolved.

Mao was the paramount leader from the founding of the PRC in 1949 until his death in 1976. His rule was unfettered by collective leadership. Mao exercised undisputed power over the party-state, including unilateral authority to decide policy, law, and political appointments. Teiwes suggests that Mao's position was secured by being a revolutionary symbol; the other leaders could not oppose Mao without undermining their own self-image as revolutionaries.

Senior offices were predominantly held by Mao's associates from the Long March and other civil war veterans. These included – at various times – Zhou Enlai, Zhu De, Liu Shaoqi, Chen Yun, Deng Xiaoping, Peng Dehuai, and Lin Biao.

With the demise of Liu, Mao promoted Lin Biao as his deputy, and the "Gang of Four" to fill the role of his trusted allies. Lin fell out of favour, however, and died in 1971 while attempting to escape to the Soviet Union. The Gang of Four, which consisted of Jiang Qing (Madame Mao), and three other members meteorically promoted in the late 1960s, were the only members of the first generation of leadership to remain after Mao's death in 1976. Their demise came shortly afterwards in a political coup managed by what became the second generation of leaders.

Of the other members identified above, Chen Yun was sidelined from the early 1960s, lost his party position in 1969, but survived to play an influential role in the second generation of leadership. Peng Dehuai was denounced in 1959, made a brief return to government in 1965, but was detained by Red Guards from 1966 and died in prison from torture and maltreatment in 1974. Deng Xiaoping, the core of the second generation of leadership, also played a key role in the first generation at various times, mainly as an ally of Zhou and Peng, but was purged from government in 1976 and remained sidelined at the time of Mao's death.

== Second generation ==
The death of Mao, Zhou and Zhu in 1976, and soon afterwards the coup that resulted in the arrest of the Gang of Four, ushered in the era now identified as the "second generation" of leaders. The era began with Hua Guofeng as the successor to Mao, but his position was soon eclipsed by the ascendancy of Deng Xiaoping as the paramount leader, in which position he remained at least until 1989 when he resigned from his leadership positions. During this period the most power and influence was held by a group of old party veterans, known as the Eight Elders, whose main members were Li Xiannian and Chen Yun, together with Deng. All of them had more than 40 years of political experience.

Thus, in official discourse, the second generation of leadership lasted from 1976 to 1992. The official discourse of the CCP today identifies Deng Xiaoping as the "core" of this second generation, but Deng was never formally the leader of the party during this period. Instead, the formal party leaders during this time were, successively, Hua Guofeng, Hu Yaobang, Zhao Ziyang and Jiang Zemin. Other prominent leaders of this generation were Chen Yun, Li Xiannian, Ye Jianying, Peng Zhen and Wang Zhen. These leaders were also involved in the Chinese Communist Revolution, but with the exception of Deng Xiaoping, served in more junior roles, as they were all born from 1897 to 1921 (that is, some were born after the demise of the Qing Empire in the Xinhai Revolution). Like the first generation, many were educated overseas, particularly in France. Their young formative experiences were similar to the first generation. Most had some position of authority during the Cultural Revolution, although as a rule those that held power after the 1980s were purged during that decade. This generation turned the focus from class struggle and political movements to economic development and pioneering the reform and opening up. The dominant political ideology of the era was Deng Xiaoping Theory.

The transition towards the third generation of leadership began with the 1989 Tiananmen Square protests and massacre. The purges that followed led to the promotion of what became the third generation of leadership. Soon afterwards, Deng resigned his last major party post, as chairman of the central military committee, although he remained influential behind the scenes until his death in 1997.

== Third generation ==
Between 1989 and 1992, Jiang Zemin was believed to be simply a transitional figure to protect the party from a power vacuum (or even an Eastern Bloc style collapse) until a more stable successor government to Deng Xiaoping could be put in place. Because of this, the era of the "third generation" is not regarded to have begun until 1992, with the election of the new CCP Politburo standing committee and Jiang consolidating his power without Deng. Jiang played an important role in the period between 1989 and 2002, when as Chinese president he subverted the existing constitution and turned the presidency from a symbolic role into an executive one by his power of general secretary.

Thus, the "third generation" lasted from 1992 to 2002, with Jiang Zemin as core, and other leaders including Li Peng, Zhu Rongji, Qiao Shi, Li Ruihuan, Liu Huaqing, Hu Jintao, Wei Jianxing, and Li Lanqing. These leaders were born before the revolution from 1924 to 1934 but were educated afterwards before the Sino-Soviet split. Most of them received education in the Soviet Union as engineers and entered the party initially as factory managers. As a result, many of them did not wield any significant political power prior to the 1980s, spending their time during the Cultural Revolution and its aftermath working for the civil infrastructure of the state and were protected from the purges, as opposed to their predecessors. Unlike their predecessors, there is a split between the political and military leadership. Their formative experiences included the Second Sino-Japanese War and the Korean War. This generation continued economic development while China saw the emergence of various serious social issues. The political ideological innovation officially associated with this period was Jiang's "Three Represents".

The initial members of the third generation were mostly survivors from before 1989, including Jiang Zemin, Li Peng (who continued as premier), Qiao Shi and Li Ruihuan. Notable changes to the leadership were the elevation of Zhu Rongji in place of Li Peng as premier in 1998 and the elevation of Hu Jintao as vice president. For the first time since 1982, the three centres of power of the presidency, the party general secretaryship and the chairmanship of the central military commission were concentrated in a single person, Jiang Zemin. This enabled him to declare himself the "core" of the third generation of leadership.

During this period, while Deng Xiaoping had retired from all leadership positions, he remained influential. In 1992, Deng's informal intervention ensured that market-orientated reforms were not halted by resurgent conservative elements. (See also Deng Xiaoping's southern tour.) Deng also played an important role in nominating Hu Jintao as Jiang's successor as party secretary.

== Fourth generation ==
2002 saw the first orderly transition of power in the Chinese Communist Party in accordance with rules on term limits. The new leaders were elected to the Communist Party's Politburo in November 2002, and took up their governmental positions in March 2003, while the most prominent of their "third generation" predecessors stepped down at the same time. But Hu Jintao did not become the chairman of the Central Military Commission until September 2004.

The Chinese Government considers the Hu-Wen administration to be a continuation of the third generation, and the Xi-Li administration to be the start of the Fourth generation.

Thus, the era of the "fourth generation" is officially regarded to have begun in 2002, and lasted until 2012, when the next election for the party leadership occurred. The prominent leaders included Hu Jintao (as General Secretary), Wu Bangguo, Wen Jiabao, Jia Qinglin, Zeng Qinghong, Huang Ju, Wu Guanzheng, Li Changchun, Luo Gan, Xi Jinping, Li Keqiang, He Guoqiang, and Zhou Yongkang. It is also known as the "republican generation" or the Hu-Wen Administration. These were promoted to top leadership at the 16th Party Congress and remained in power until the 18th Party Congress in 2012. This generation of leaders, born mainly in the World War II years from 1939 to 1944, represented a new technocratic style governance and a less centralized political structure. The majority of this generation of leaders were engineers whose academic lives were disrupted by the Cultural Revolution and, unlike both their predecessors and likely successors, have spent very little time overseas. The dominant political ideology of this era was Hu's Scientific Development Concept and a goal for a Socialist Harmonious Society.

== Fifth generation (current) ==
The fifth generation came to power at the 18th Party Congress in 2012, when Hu Jintao stepped down as CCP General Secretary and CMC Chairman. In the fifth generation, one sees fewer engineers and more management and finance majors, including successful entrepreneurs. Most of the fifth generation of civilian leadership, born in the postwar years 1945 to 1955, were educated at top Chinese universities. Former leader Hu Jintao's Communist Youth League faction, and the Crown Prince Party (or "Princelings") are seen to be the two dominant factions within the leadership.

Following his elevation to General Secretary of the Chinese Communist Party and Chairman of the Central Military Commission, which oversees the Chinese Communist Party and the People's Liberation Army, the Princeling and current CCP General Secretary Xi Jinping succeeded Hu Jintao as the paramount leader of this generation. Premier Li Keqiang took the place of former Premier Wen Jiabao and served until 2023. Others who have been top figures in the 5th generation include former Congress Chairmen Zhang Dejiang and Li Zhanshu, Conference Chairmen Yu Zhengsheng and Wang Yang, Secretariat First Secretaries Liu Yunshan and Wang Huning, former vice president and Discipline Secretary Wang Qishan, former Discipline Secretary and current Congress Chairman Zhao Leji, first Vice Premiers Zhang Gaoli and current Vice President Han Zheng, former Vice President Li Yuanchao, and its leading females, former Vice Premiers Liu Yandong and Sun Chunlan.

After the 20th CCP National Congress in 2022, the CCP Politburo Standing Committee members included Xi Jinping, Li Qiang, Zhao Leji, Wang Huning, Cai Qi, and Li Xi.

== Possible sixth generation ==
The sixth generation of leaders had been expected to come to power at the 20th Party Congress in 2022. However, following Xi Jinping's consolidation of power at the 19th Party Congress, the future of the "sixth generation" was cast into doubt as clear successor figures failed to be named to senior leadership posts, particularly the Politburo Standing Committee. Xi Jinping was re-elected as the General Secretary of the Chinese Communist Party in 2022.

In preceding years, Hu Chunhua (a Vice-Premier from 2018 to 2023) was seen as a possible core figure. Hu and Sun Zhengcai were the only Politburo members named at the 18th Party Congress in 2012 who were born after 1960, making their further advancement seem like a certainty, but Sun was purged before the 19th Party Congress and Hu was dropped from the Politburo at the 20th. U.S.-based newspaper Duo Wei Times also listed four figures who have since fallen from grace, former Fujian Governor Su Shulin, former President of the Supreme People's Court Zhou Qiang, former Heilongjiang Party Secretary Zhang Qingwei, and former Minister of Natural Resources Lu Hao, as other potential figures in this generation of leadership. Others in this rough age group ascending in the ranks include Zhang Guoqing (now a Vice-Premier) and Chen Min'er (party secretary of Chongqing and then Tianjin).

Ding Xuexiang is the only person from this age bracket to have reached the Standing Committee, but the 20th Politburo includes eight other members born between 1960 and 1964.

Others are Yuan Jiajun, Yin Li, Li Shulei, Chen Xiaojiang, Wang Xiaohui, Luo Wen, Xu Kunlin, Yin Hong, Shen Xiaoming, Chen Gang, Zhou Zuyi, Zhao Long, Zhao Gang, Zhao Yide, Huang Jianfa and since May 2026 Ding Xiangqun as the first female party secretary of the National Financial Regulatory Administration。

== Possible seventh generation ==
Born in the 1970s (or in the late 1960s if loosely defined), the seventh generation of leaders includes Yin Yong, Mayor of Beijing; Zhuge Yujie, Deputy Party Secretary of Hubei; Liu Hongjian, Deputy Party Secretary of Yunnan; Guo Ningning, Deputy Party Secretary of Fujian. Other Post-70s politicians are Zhu Zhongming, Mayor of Shanghai; Liu Qiang, Deputy Party Secretary of Shandong and Xie Weijiang, Deputy Party Secretary of Hunan. From the financial sector: Ge Haijiao as the Party Secretary of the Bank of China.

Only one provincial leader born in the 1970s is serving as a full member of the Central Committee of the Chinese Communist Party: Wei Tao since July 2025 as the chairman of the Guangxi Zhuang Autonomous Region People's Government. As of mid-2025, most leaders born in the 1970s served in positions at the deputy provincial-ministerial level. Five were full provincial-ministerial leaders: A Dong [zh], First Secretary of the Communist Youth League of China. Lu Dongliang, Governor of Shanxi. Liu Xiaotao, Governor of Jiangsu and Liu Jie, Governor of Zhejiang.

== Timeline ==
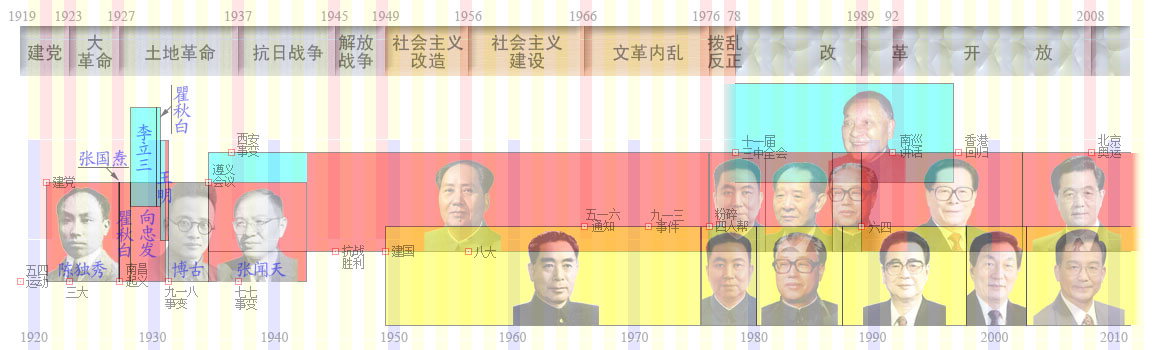
Simplified Chinese graphic timeline of CCP leadership to 2012. The red bar indicates CCP General Secretaries, the yellow indicating the Premiers. The gray bar delineates particular periods of mainland Chinese history from a CCP perspective.
Chen Duxiu
Xiang Zhongfa
Bo Gu
Zhang Wentian
Hu Yaobang
Zhao Ziyang
Jiang Zemin
Hu Jintao
Xi Jinping
Mao Zedong
Hua Guofeng
Hu Yaobang
Zhou Enlai
Hua Guofeng
Zhao Ziyang
Li Peng
Zhu Rongji
Wen Jiabao
Li Keqiang
Li Qiang
Liu Shaoqi
Zhu De
Ye Jianying
Peng Zhen
Wan Li
Qiao Shi
Li Peng
Wu Bangguo
Zhang Dejiang
Li Zhanshu
Zhao Leji
Zhang Guotao
Zhou Enlai
Yang Yin
Zhou Enlai
Yuan Xiangying
Zhou Enlai
Li Fuchun
Xiang Ying
Zhu De
Mao Zedong
Mao Zedong
Hua Goufeng
Deng Xiaoping
Jiang Zemin
Hu Jintao
Xi Jinping
1st
2nd
3rd
4th
5th
i.
ii.
iii.
ii.
iv.
v.
vi.
vii.
viii.
Dengism
ix.
x.
Xi-ism
│
1916
│
1926
│
1936
│
1946
│
1956
│
1966
│
1976
│
1986
│
1996
│
2006
│
2016
│
2026
General Secretaries and Chairmen in red, and Premiers in yellow. Chairman of the National People's Congress in blue. Head of the Chinese military in teal.
i. First United Front
ii. Chinese Communist Revolution (First phase 1927-1936, Second phase 1946-1949
iii. Second United Front
iv. Socialist Transformation
v. Great Leap Forward
vi. Socialist Education Movement
vii. Cultural Revolution
viii. Two Whatevers
ix. Three Represents
x. Scientific Outlook on Development

== See also ==
- Paramount leader
- Leadership core
- Politics of China
- Order of precedence in China
- History of the People's Republic of China
