= Central Advisory Commission =

Former Chinese government body

Central Advisory Commission of the Chinese Communist Party

Information
- Chairman: Deng Xiaoping; Chen Yun
- Elected by: Central Committee of the Chinese Communist Party
- Seats: Between 172 and 200

Meeting place
- Huairen Hall, Zhongnanhai; Beijing (Standing Committee)

Central Advisory Commission
- Simplified Chinese: 中央顾问委员会
- Traditional Chinese: 中央顧問委員會
Transcriptions
Standard Mandarin
- Hanyu Pinyin: Zhōngyāng Gùwèn Wěiyuánhuì

The Central Advisory Commission (CAC) was a body of the Chinese Communist Party (CCP) that existed from September 1982 to October 1992, during the era of the paramount leadership of Deng Xiaoping. The body was supposed to provide "political assistance and consultation" to the CCP Central Committee; however, it was often seen as having more authority unofficially than that body.

== History ==
Since the People's Republic of China had failed to establish a retirement system for cadres and leaders, by the late Cultural Revolution, the age of leading cadres had generally increased, and the training and selection of successors was very weak, which made it difficult for the succession of party and state leaders to take over their positions. During the 10th Party National Congress in 1973, Chairman Mao Zedong considered establishing a "Central Advisory Committee" composed mainly of veteran cadres, but it was not realized. Afterwards, Premier Zhou Enlai explained this at a meeting: "In the past, there was no such system in our party. When Chairman Mao said he wanted to be the chairman of the ‘Advisory Committee,’ we all disagreed. Chairman Mao was not joking at the time; he really wanted to do it. He said: But I still have to manage it, not only ‘advise’ but also ‘ask.’ Because everyone opposed it, Chairman Mao said: Since you all disagree, I have no choice but to remain the chairman and do my best."

On 14 July 1975, Deng Xiaoping spoke at an enlarged meeting of the Central Military Commission about the issue of setting up advisory groups in the army: "Setting up advisory groups is a new thing and a good way to put forward under the current situation of our army. The first question is who will be the advisor and the second question is what to do after becoming an advisor?" "The head of the advisory group will not participate in the Party Committee, but can attend the Party Committee meetings to communicate with the advisory group. Other benefits will remain unchanged, but the allocation of cars and secretaries will be changed." "Advisors also have rights, namely the right to make suggestions. Advisors should be able to do things well and be detached; otherwise, they will interfere in everything, and the Party Committee at the same level will not be able to handle it. What problems will arise after setting up advisory groups? We will summarize the experience after a year or so." At that time, the advisory system proposed by Deng was not fully implemented, and no one was willing to be an advisor. In 1976, Deng was removed from leadership, and the matter of setting up advisory groups was shelved.

After the third plenary session of the 11th CCP Central Committee held at the end of 1978, the issue of the abolition of the lifetime tenure system for leading cadres was raised. Deng Xiaoping believed that the most fundamental thing was to establish a retirement system for leading cadres, but before the retirement system could be fully established, under the circumstances at that time, the advisory committee was adopted as a transitional form as the first step. On 2 November 1979, Deng pointed out at a meeting of cadres above the vice minister level in the central party, government and military organs: "Now we are carrying out the Four Modernizations, and we urgently need to cultivate and select a large number of qualified talents. This is a new issue and also a responsibility for veteran comrades and senior cadres, which is to carefully select successors." "A few years ago, I proposed to establish an advisory system, but it did not work out completely, and many people were unwilling to be advisors. Now it seems that to truly solve the problem, we cannot rely solely on the advisory system; the important thing is to establish a retirement system." On 18 August 1980, Deng proposed at an enlarged meeting of the Politburo: "The Central Committee has already established a Discipline Inspection Commission and is considering establishing an advisory committee (the name can be reconsidered). Together with the Central Committee, they will be elected by the National Congress of the Party and their respective tasks and powers will be clearly defined. In this way, a large number of veteran comrades who originally worked in the Central Committee and the State Council can make full use of their experience and play their guiding, supervisory and advisory roles. At the same time, it will also make the daily work teams of the Central Committee and the State Council more efficient and gradually realize rejuvenation.. In 1981, the Chinese Communist Party celebrated its 60th anniversary. On 2 July 1981, Deng raised the issue of setting up an advisory committee again at a meeting of secretaries of provincial, municipal and autonomous regional party committees, saying that "this is for the sake of the future".

The Central Advisory Commission was a new institution established based on the actual circumstances of the Chinese Communist Party. It served as an organizational form to address the generational transition within the Party's central leadership. Its aim was to rejuvenate the Central Committee while allowing some veteran comrades to continue playing a role after retiring from frontline positions. At the first plenary meeting of the Central Advisory Commission held on 13 September 1982, Deng Xiaoping, director of the Central Advisory Commission, gave a comprehensive explanation of the nature, tasks, working methods and precautions of the Central Advisory Commission. He emphasized that "the advisory commission is a transitional organizational form because the most fundamental system for our country and our party should be the establishment of a retirement system." He also asked the Central Advisory Commission to "pay attention to the first thing, which is not to hinder the work of the Central Committee." Deng Xiaoping believed that the retirement system should be gradually established and eventually completed through this transitional method within 10 years (i.e., two terms), and that the Central Advisory Commission should be abolished after no more than 15 years (three terms).

The Central Advisory Commission was a new institution established based on the actual situation of the Communist Party of China. It was an organizational form for resolving the generational transition within the Party's central leadership. Its purpose was to rejuvenate the Central Committee while allowing some veteran comrades to continue playing a role after retiring from frontline positions.

— Deng Xiaoping

In June 1983, Liao Chengzhi, a candidate for Vice President of China, died. Due to the negligence of the relevant departments, some members of the Standing Committee of the Central Advisory Commission were not notified to attend the memorial service, which sparked controversy among veteran comrades regarding the treatment that members of the Central Advisory Commission should receive. On 3 July, Hu Yaobang, General Secretary of the CCP Central Committee, wrote in a reply to Bo Yibo: "The political and material treatment of the members of the Standing Committee of the Central Advisory Commission is completely equal to that of the members of the Politburo. This is determined by the Central Committee, and no one has the right to change it on their own. In particular, for the weddings and funerals of the Party and the State, these veteran comrades should be arranged to appear as if they were members of the Politburo. Anyone who violates this rule will be held accountable."

In 1987, a new Central Advisory Commission was formed at the 13th CCP National Congress. Subsequently, the first plenary session of the Central Advisory Commission elected Chen Yun as its chairman and Bo Yibo and Song Renqiong as its vice chairmen. Bo Yibo continued to preside over the daily work of the Central Advisory Commission. In September 1989, Deng Xiaoping explicitly proposed that the Central Advisory Commission would no longer be established after the 14th CCP National Congress. In the first half of 1991, Chen Pixian visited Chen Yun, the chairman of the Central Advisory Commission, in Shanghai. Chen Yun asked Chen Pixian to convey his opinion to Bo Yibo and Song Renqiong after returning to Beijing. Chen Yun said: "I will not continue after the 14th CCP National Congress. I have considered it and made a decision. As for whether Comrade Yibo and Renqiong will continue or not, and whether the Central Advisory Commission will be established afterward, please let them study it." After hearing Chen Pixian convey Chen Yun's opinion, Bo Yibo and Song Renqiong also expressed that they would both step down and that the Central Advisory Commission would no longer be established after the 14th CCP National Congress. The Standing Committee of the Central Advisory Commission also unanimously agreed and reported to Chen Yun. Chen Yun was very pleased to hear this.

On 7 October 1992, Bo Yibo convened a plenary meeting of the Central Advisory Commission in its conference room to discuss the commission's work report submitted to the 14th CCP National Congress. The report suggested that "the Central Advisory Commission could be discontinued after the 14th National Congress of the CCP." The 144 attendees did not raise any objections to the commission's work over the past five years, but reacted strongly to the suggestion that it be discontinued after the 14th National Congress. Most members advocated retaining the commission for a period longer. Bo Yibo told the members that regarding the discontinuation of the Central Advisory Commission after the 14th National Congress, Deng Xiaoping had asked President Yang Shangkun to inform Bo Yibo two years earlier after returning from Beidaihe, instructing him to consider abolishing the Commission at the 14th National Congress. Bo had expressed no objection. However, before the 14th CCP National Congress, Deng reiterated that the Commission must be abolished. Subsequently, Bo also mentioned Chen Yun's request, conveyed through Chen Pixian, to Bo Yibo and Song Renqiong regarding the discontinuation of the Central Advisory Commission after the 14th CCP National Congress. Bo Yibo said: "Comrade Xiaoping spoke, Comrade Chen Yun spoke, and they were the directors of the 12th and 13th Central Advisory Commissions respectively. The Central Committee also made a decision. Faced with this serious issue, Comrade Ren Qiong and I can only carry it out and have no other ideas." The members of the Central Advisory Commission present applauded to express their agreement. On 9 October 1992, Bo Yibo presided over the last plenary meeting of the Central Advisory Commission, and the meeting unanimously adopted the work report of the CAC to the 14th CCP National Congress. On 18 October 1992, the 14th CCP National Congress adopted the resolution on the work report of the Central Advisory Commission and agreed to the suggestion that the Central Advisory Commission should no longer be established. The Central Advisory Commission then went into history. The advisory commissions of provinces, autonomous regions and municipalities directly under the Central Government were also abolished.

On 15 January 2007, Bo Yibo, the last surviving former vice chairman of the Central Advisory Commission, died. On 31 July 2015, Zhang Jingfu, the last surviving former member of the Standing Committee of the Central Advisory Commission, died. On 31 March 2023, Wan Haifeng, the last surviving former member of the Central Advisory Commission, died.

== Functions ==
The CAC's chairmen were Deng Xiaoping (1982–1987) and Chen Yun (1987–1992). Its membership was offered only to members of the Central Committee with forty years or more of service which made it an important forum for the Eight Elders to remain formally involved in politics. Directors and deputy directors were required to have first served in the Politburo or Politburo Standing Committee. Despite being supposedly advisory its power surpassed that of the Politburo Standing Committee and was nicknamed the "Sitting Committee" on account of the advanced age of its members.

Members of the Central Advisory Commission were required to have been members of the CCP for more than 40 years and have extensive experience within the Party. The term of office of the Central Advisory Commission was the same as that of the Central Committee. The Standing Committee, the chairman, and the vice-chairmen were elected by the plenary session of the Central Advisory Commission and approved by the Central Committee. The chairman must had be selected from the Politburo Standing Committee. At the same time, the Constitution of the Chinese Communist Party also stipulated the establishment of provincial, autonomous region, and municipal advisory commissions, which were elected by the provincial, autonomous region, and municipal congresses of the Chinese Communist Party. On 6 September 1982, the 12th CCP National Congress adopted Article 22 of the Constitution of the Chinese Communist Party, which stipulated that "the Central Advisory Commission is the political assistant and advisor of the Central Committee." Therefore, in the first paragraph of Deng Xiaoping's speech at the first plenary session of the Central Advisory Commission, it was proposed that "some veteran comrades can continue to play a certain role after retiring from the front line". Members of the Central Advisory Commission could attend the plenary session of the Central Committee, and the vice-chairmen of the Central Advisory Commission could attend the plenary session of the Politburo. When necessary, the Standing Committee members of the Central Advisory Commission can also attend Politburo meetings. Therefore, in the structure of the CCP, the members of the Central Advisory Commission are equivalent to members of the Central Committee, the vice chairmen and standing committee members of the Central Advisory Commission are equivalent to members of the Political Bureau of the Central Committee, and the director of the Central Advisory Commission was also a member of the Politburo Standing Committee.

The Central Advisory Commission worked under the leadership of the Central Committee, and its specific tasks were threefold: first, to make suggestions on policies; second, to assist in the investigation of problems; and third, to carry out propaganda. In addition, it also undertook other tasks entrusted by the Central Committee. Deng Xiaoping appointed Bo Yibo, the vice chairman, to preside over the daily work of the Central Advisory Commission. In fact, because the members of the Central Advisory Commission had a long history of seniority in the Chinese Communist Party, "their reputation was stronger than that of the members of the Central Committee", their influence was often greater than the powers granted by regulations.

== Commentary ==
According to Yasheng Huang, the CAC served as a restraint on the leadership at the time by the Eight Elders and was, as an institution, "best positioned to check and balance a future dictator." Huang stated that its abolition paved the way for the rise of current CCP general secretary Xi Jinping.

According to Joseph Fewsmith, the establishment of the CAC incentivised the retirement of senior cadres by guaranteeing a continued degree of influence. This potentially paved the way to the establishment of other norms on retirement, throughout the 15th and 16th Party Congresses and including the later "Seven up, Eight Down" (七上八下) rule under Jiang Zemin. Still, Fewsmith rejects the idea that this constitutes a case of institutionalisation of party politics, considering it to be another example of personalised rule in the Deng-Jiang eras.

== See also ==
- Politics of the People's Republic of China
- Gerontocracy
