= 20th Politburo of the Chinese Communist Party =

The 20th Politburo of the Chinese Communist Party (CCP), formally the Political Bureau of the 20th Central Committee of the Communist Party of China, was elected at the 1st plenary session of the 20th Central Committee of the CCP on 23 October 2022 in the aftermath of the 20th National Congress. This electoral term was preceded by the 19th Politburo. Seven of the 24 members serve in the 20th Politburo Standing Committee.

The 20th CCP Politburo was noted as the first to include a former Minister of State Security and the first Politburo with no women in 25 years. It is also the first since 1977 to include the head of the United Front Work Department. It was also noted for the lack of officials with Tuanpai or Shanghai clique backgrounds, with nearly all members considered to be a part of the Xi Jinping faction. All members are Han Chinese, the majority ethnic group in the country. According to informal party convention, party leaders aged 68 or above are not eligible to remain in the Politburo but the 20th reelected three members past that age.

== Convocations ==
Disclosed convocations of the 20th Politburo
Date	Length	Type	Ref.
25 October 2022	1 day	Ordinary meeting	
25 October 2022	1 day	1st Collective Study Session	
6 December 2022	1 day	Ordinary meeting	
27 December 2022	1 day	Democratic life meeting	
31 January 2023	1 day	2nd Collective Study Session	
21 February 2023	1 day	Ordinary meeting	
22 February 2023	1 day	3rd Collective Study Session	
30 March 2023	1 day	Ordinary meeting	
30 March 2023	1 day	4th Collective Study Session	
28 April 2023	1 day	Ordinary meeting	
29 May 2023	1 day	5th Collective Study Session	
30 June 2023	1 day	Ordinary meeting	
30 June 2023	1 day	6th Collective Study Session	
24 July 2023	1 day	Ordinary meeting	
24 July 2023	1 day	7th Collective Study Session	
31 August 2023	1 day	Ordinary meeting	
27 September 2023	1 day	Ordinary meeting	
27 September 2023	1 day	8th Collective Study Session	
27 October 2023	1 day	Ordinary meeting	
27 October 2023	1 day	9th Collective Study Session	
27 November 2023	1 day	Ordinary meeting	
27 November 2023	1 day	10th Collective Study Session	
8 December 2023	1 day	Ordinary meeting	
27 December 2023	1 day	Democratic life meeting	
31 January 2024	1 day	Ordinary meeting	
31 January 2024	1 day	11th Collective Study Session	
29 February 2024	1 day	Ordinary meeting	
1 March 2024	1 day	12th Collective Study Session	
29 March 2024	1 day	Ordinary meeting	
30 April 2024	1 day	Ordinary meeting	
27 May 2024	1 day	Ordinary meeting	
28 May 2024	1 day	14th Collective Study Session	
27 June 2024	1 day	Ordinary meeting	
28 June 2024	1 day	15th Collective Study Session	
30 July 2024	1 day	Ordinary meeting	
31 July 2024	1 day	16th Collective Study Session	
23 August 2024	1 day	Ordinary meeting	
26 September 2024	1 day	Ordinary meeting	
28 October 2024	1 day	Ordinary meeting	
28 October 2024	1 day	17th Collective Study Session	
9 December 2024	1 day	Ordinary meeting	
9 December 2024	1 day	18th Collective Study Session	
27 December 2024	1 day	Democratic life meeting	
20 January 2025	1 day	Ordinary meeting	
28 February 2025	1 day	Ordinary meeting	
1 March 2025	1 day	19th Collective Study Session	
31 March 2025	1 day	Ordinary meeting	
25 April 2025	1 day	Ordinary meeting	
26 April 2025	1 day	20th Collective Study Session	
30 June 2025	1 day	Ordinary meeting	
30 June 2025	1 day	21st Collective Study Session	
30 July 2025	1 day	Ordinary meeting	
29 August 2025	1 day	Ordinary meeting	
29 September 2025	1 day	Ordinary meeting	
29 September 2025	1 day	22nd Collective Study Session	
28 November 2025	1 day	Ordinary meeting	
29 November 2025	1 day	23rd Collective Study Session	
8 December 2025	1 day	Ordinary meeting	
25 December 2025	1 day	Ordinary meeting	
26 December 2025	1 day	Democratic life meeting	
30 January 2026	1 day	Ordinary meeting	
31 January 2026	1 day	24th Collective Study Session	
27 February 2026	1 day	Ordinary meeting	
27 March 2026	1 day	Ordinary meeting	
28 April 2026	1 day	Ordinary meeting	
28 April 2026	1 day	25th Collective Study Session	
30 June 2026	1 day	Ordinary meeting	
30 July 2026	1 day	Ordinary meeting	
31 July 2026	1 day	27th Collective Study Session	
22 September 2026	1 day	Ordinary meeting	

== Composition ==
Members of the Political Bureau of the 20th Central Committee of the Chinese Communist Party
Officeholder			19th	Birth	PM	Birthplace	Education	Offices held	Ref.
Cai Qi	Cai Qi	蔡奇	Old	1955	1975	Fujian	Graduate	Three: Party offices; First Secretary, Secretariat of the Central Committee; Director, General Office of the Central Committee; Director, Office of the General Secretary of the Central Committee	
	Chen Jining	陈吉宁	New	1964	1984	Liaoning	Graduate	One: Party office; Secretary, Shanghai Municipal Party Committee	
	Chen Min'er	陈敏尔	Old	1960	1982	Zhejiang	Graduate	One: Party office; Secretary, Tianjin Municipal Party Committee	
	Chen Wenqing	陈文清	New	1960	1983	Sichuan	Graduate	One: Party office; Secretary, Central Political and Legal Affairs Commission	
Ding Xuexiang	Ding Xuexiang	丁薛祥	Old	1961	1984	Jiangsu	Graduate	One: State office; First-Ranked Vice Premier of the State Council	
	He Lifeng	何立峰	New	1955	1981	Guangdong	Graduate	Two: Party office; Director, Office of the Central Financial and Economic Affairs Commission; State office; Second-Ranked Vice Premier of the State Council	
	He Weidong (Note: He Weidong was removed from the Politburo on 17 October 2023.)	何卫东	New	1957	1978	Fujian	Undergraduate	Two: Party office; Second Vice Chairman, Central Military Commission; State office; Second Vice Chairman, Central Military Commission	
	Huang Kunming	黄坤明	Old	1956	1976	Fujian	Graduate	One: Party office; Secretary, Guangdong Provincial Party Committee	
	Li Ganjie	李干杰	New	1964	1984	Hunan	Graduate	One: Party office; Head, Organization Department of the Central Committee	
	Li Hongzhong	李鸿忠	Old	1956	1976	Shenyang	Graduate	One: State office; First Vice Chairman, Standing Committee of the National People's Congress	
Li Qiang	Li Qiang	李强	Old	1958	1983	Zhejiang	Graduate	Eight: Party offices; Director, Central Institutional Organisation Commission; Deputy Director, Central Comprehensively Deepening Reforms Commission; Deputy Director, Central Financial and Economic Affairs Commission; Deputy Director, Central Cyberspace Affairs Commission; Deputy Director, Central Foreign Affairs Commission; Leader, Central Leading Group for Climate Change and Emissions Reduction; Leader, State Council Leading Party Members Group; State offices; Premier, State Council of the People's Republic of China	
	Li Shulei	李书磊	New	1964	1986	Henan	Graduate	One: Party office; Head, Publicity Department of the Central Committee	
Li Xi	Li Xi	李希	Old	1956	1982	Gansu	Graduate	Two: Party office; Secretary, Standing Committee of the Central Commission for Discipline Inspection; Director, Central Leading Group for Inspection Work	
	Liu Guozhong	刘国中	New	1962	1986	Heilongjiang	Graduate	One: State office; Fourth-Ranked Vice Premier of the State Council	
	Ma Xingrui (Note: Ma Xingrui was removed from the Politburo on 14 July 2026.)	马兴瑞	New	1959	1988	Heilongjiang	Graduate	One: Party office; Secretary, Xinjiang Provincial Party Committee	
	Shi Taifeng	石泰峰	New	1956	1982	Shanxi	Graduate	Two: Party office; Head, United Front Work Department of the Central Committee; Organisational office; Vice Chairman, National Committee of the Chinese People's Political Consultative Conference	
Wang Huning	Wang Huning	王沪宁	Old	1955	1984	Shanghai	Graduate	One: Organisational office; Chairman, National Committee of the Chinese People's Political Consultative Conference	
	Wang Yi	王毅	New	1953	1981	Beijing	Graduate	Two: Party office; Director, Office of the Central Foreign Affairs Commission; State office; Minister of Foreign Affairs, People's Republic of China	
Xi Jinping	Xi Jinping	习近平	Old	1953	1974	Beijing	Graduate	Eleven: Party offices; General Secretary, Central Committee; Chairman, National Security Commission of the Central Committee; Chairman, Central Comprehensively Deepening Reforms Commission of the Central Committee; Head, Central Leading Group for Taiwan Affairs of the Central Committee; Head, Central Leading Group for Financial and Economic Work of the Central Committee; Head, Central Leading Group for Network Security and Information Technology of the Central Committee; Military offices; Chairman, Central Military Commission; Commander-in-chief, Joint Operations Command Center of the Central Military Commission of the People's Liberation Army; Head, Leading Group for National Defence and Military Reform of the Central Military Commission; Head, Office of the Central Integrated Military-Civilian Development Committee; State offices; President of the People's Republic of China	
	Yin Li	尹力	New	1962	1980	Shandong	Graduate	One: Party office; Secretary, Beijing City Party Committee	
	Yuan Jiajun	袁家军	New	1962	1992	Jilin	Graduate	One: Party office; Secretary, Chongqing Municipal Party Committee	
	Zhang Guoqing	张国清	New	1964	1984	Henan	Graduate	One: State office; Third-Ranked Vice Premier of the State Council	
	Zhang Shengmin (Note: Zhang Shengmin was promoted to the Politburo on 29 October 2026.)	张升民	5th PLE	1958	1979	Shaanxi	Graduate	Three: Party office; First Vice Chairman, Central Military Commission; Deputy Secretary of the Central Commission for Discipline Inspection; State office; First Vice Chairman, Central Military Commission	
	Zhang Youxia (Note: Zhang Youxia was removed from the Politburo on 21 September 2026.)	张又侠	Old	1950	1969	Beijing	Graduate	Two: Party office; First Vice Chairman, Central Military Commission; State office; First Vice Chairman, Central Military Commission	
Zhao Leji	Zhao Leji	赵乐际	Old	1957	1975	Shandong	Graduate	One: State office; Chairman, Standing Committee of the National People's Congress	

== See also ==
- Politburo Standing Committee of the Chinese Communist Party
- Politburo of the Chinese Communist Party
- General secretaryship of Xi Jinping
