= 20th Politburo =

20th Politburo may refer to:

- 20th Politburo of the Chinese Communist Party
- Presidium of the 20th Congress of the Communist Party of the Soviet Union
