= General line =

General line may have the following meanings:

- General line of the party
- The General Line, a 1929 Soviet film by Sergei Eisenstein
- General line of merchandise
- General line (military)
