= Mass line =

Maoist organizational method

- Traditional Chinese: 群眾路線
- Simplified Chinese: 群众路线
Transcriptions
Standard Mandarin
- Hanyu Pinyin: qúnzhòng lùxiàn
- Wade–Giles: ch'ün-chung lu-hsien
Yue: Cantonese
- Jyutping: kwan^{4} zung^{3} lou^{6} sin^{3}
Southern Min
- Hokkien POJ: kûn-chiòng lō͘-sòaⁿ

The mass line is a political, organizational, and leadership methodology developed by Mao Zedong and the Chinese Communist Party (CCP) during the Chinese Communist Revolution. Who used the term first is disputed, with some crediting Li Lisan and others Zhou Enlai. In mass line methodology, leadership formulates policy based on theory, implements it based on the people's real world conditions, revises the theory and policy based on actual practice, and uses that revised theory as the guide to future practice. This process is summarized as leadership "from the masses, to the masses", repeated indefinitely.

Mao developed the mass line into an organizing methodology that encompasses philosophy, strategy, tactics, leadership, and organizational theory, which has been applied by many communists subsequent to the Chinese Communist Revolution: from Che Guevara in Latin America, to Ho Chi Minh in Vietnam. Many CCP leaders have attributed their attainment of power to the faithful pursuit of effective "mass line" tactics, and a "correct" mass line is supposed to be the essential prerequisite for the full consolidation of power.

== Theory ==
In its original conception, the mass line referred to both an ideological goal as well as a working method based on "pooling the wisdom of the masses" (simplified Chinese: 集中群众智慧; traditional Chinese: 集中群眾智慧; pinyin: jízhōng qúnzhòng zhìhuì) from which CCP leadership could formulate policy after further deliberation, adjustments, implementation and experimentation, which would in turn continue to receive feedback from the masses. The methodology is as follows:

1. An initial policy is formulated based on historical analysis and theory.
2. As it is implemented, the policy and underlying theory are revised consistent with real world conditions.
3. This revised theory then becomes the guide to future correct action.

Thus, the mass line is a method in which theory is refined by practice, with leadership flowing "to the masses - from the masses - to the masses".

In doing this, a line of feedback is formed between leaders and masses, representing the aggregate interests of ordinary people on their behalf, in a Maoist political line, ostensibly derived "from the peasants". It is government's role to listen to the scattered ideas of the masses, turn them into systemic ones, and return them back to the people as a guide for action. This is a process by which leadership refines the views of the people, "pooling the wisdom of the masses", while constantly adjusting and testing decisions in an "endless spiral" of improvement.

Pragmatic considerations evident in mass line include its ability to reconcile central leadership with mass consultation. It alleviates "two problematic tendencies" that occur with centralization: losing touch with popular sentiment and creating political apathy among citizens. Some have gone as far as to speculate that Mao's success resulted from his understanding of how government can employ mass line to its strength.

Mass line is also part of a long spanning Marxist–Leninist "epistemology (zhishi lun) or methodology (fangfa lun)". Mao acknowledged inspiration in the October Revolution and subsequent formation of Vladimir Lenin's Vanguard Party. Mass line also exhibits elements of ancient Chinese beliefs, which emphasized the importance of wise rulers reading signs of popular discontent in order to avoid social calamity. Some argue that Mao's conception of the mass line reflected his faith in the people as well as a theory of "history from below."

The principle of the mass line is reflected in the Party slogan "serve the people". The mass line can be approximated with the median voter or people with median income.

The legacy of mass line principles is also reflected in the interpersonal relationships between party officials in local party branches and the people in their jurisdictions. In many localities, county and township-level officials are required to visit villages in their jurisdictions to personally acquaint themselves with residents and their needs. Academic Jing Vivian Zhan describes China's petitioning system as related to mass line principles. Through the petitioning system, citizens can register complaints about socioeconomic problems with government departments and provide a mechanism for the state to collect political inputs from, and remain in contact with, the public.

== History ==
=== Mao Zedong ===
Throughout Mao Zedong's early revolutionary activity among the peasantry of the Hunan Province, he preached that the CCP must rely on the masses for its strength, serve their needs, "draw inspiration" from them, and orient its political ideology and organizational tactics to their responsiveness. This is formally articulated in the 1927 Report on an Investigation of the Peasant Movement in Hunan, which Mao wrote while working in Changsha. Among other observations, the Hunan Report highlighted the challenges to and successes of local CCP mobilization.

In 1948, Mao stated that discussion of mass line had been ongoing for "the past dozen years". This situates its conception in the 1930s at the beginning of the Yan'an Rectification Movement (1935–1947). Mao's published works reflect this: in a speech given at the Yan'an Forum on Literature and Art in 1942, mass line was articulated as an unofficial doctrine of communism. In one section, Mao argues that cultural workers have a role to play in the revolutionary army just as peasants do, emphasizing that artists and their like must serve the people by becoming one with the masses.

Becoming one with the masses was also asserted as a strategy by which leaders and local organizers could form a common language, Maoism, allowing them to unite and "analyze China's problems and propose solutions":

"Revolutionary statesmen, the political specialists who know the science or art of revolutionary politics, are simply the leaders of millions upon millions of statesmen—the masses. Their task is to collect the opinions of these mass statesmen, sift and refine them, and return them to the masses who then take them and put them into practice".

On June 1, 1943, Mao formally articulated this message, the essence of mass line, in a report to the Central Committee of the Chinese Communist Party. In the report, titled Resolution of the Central Committee of the Chinese Communist Party on Methods of Leadership, Mao argued that correct governance comes "from the masses," and is delivered back "to the masses". This required strict adherence to two principles: combining the "general with the particular" and "leadership with the masses". In asserting this, Mao answered challenges proposed in the Hunan Report by summarizing lessons learned in the Yan'an Rectification Movement. The report was passed by the Politburo of the Chinese Communist Party in 1943.

The discourse of mass line politics involved a vernacular style.

In 1945, Liu Shaoqi delivered a report to the 7th National Congress of the Chinese Communist Party, emphasizing the necessity of selfless leadership, accountable to the masses. Thus, certain mass points had to be instilled in the minds of party members. One of such was the paramount importance of external audit of leadership by the masses.

After recognizing that large numbers of cadres properly trained in mass line tactics were necessary to build a "complete socialist order", the CCP intensified its cadre training program in 1950–1951 to ensure that all cadres and other workers would be "carefully indoctrinated in basic Marxist-Leninist mass line theory and practice". The problem was deemed so serious, that CCP leadership temporarily deferred several important social reforms pending the completion of the cadre training program. In 1958, regulation required Military Officers to work one month each year in the ranks as common soldiers. Bureaucrats were under similar pressures to learn from peasants, leading many to adopt the practice of personally inspecting locales. Liu Shaoqi, for example, frequented Tianjin, the municipality where his wife was born. Across many programs implemented throughout the 1950s, the focus was the "delicate area" of leadership relations with the unconverted masses: those who had not yet bought into the communist program.

In 1956, the 8th National Congress of the Chinese Communist Party was held. In contrast with Liu Shaoqi's emphasis on the "audit by the masses" in his 7th Congress Report, the 8th Congress emphasized leadership's role as the director of the mass line. This was articulated by Deng Xiaoping in his report:

"Whether the Party can remain correct in leadership will be determined by whether the Party can systematically sum up after analysis and coordination the experiences and views of the masses and turn them into the Party's views, and then taking the resulting ideas back to the masses, explaining and popularizing them until the masses embrace the ideas as their own..."

The next period would see a grappling with the role of leadership in mass line. In the 1957 essay On the Correct Handling of Contradictions among the People, Mao outlines a new application of mass line feedback between leadership and masses. Arguing that bureaucracy has eroded mass line's efficacy, Mao proposes that intellectuals among the masses engage in a critique of government in what would come to be known as the Hundred Flowers Campaign. These critiques were promptly shut down when they became critical of government. An Anti-Rightist Campaign followed from 1957 to 1959.

While mass line was emphasized in the late 1950 and into the 1960s, its practice became less clear. This has led some to argue that post 1960s China was "a situation of unprecedented mass activity without the mass line".

- In 1961, Mao criticized Joseph Stalin for a lack of faith in the peasantry and the masses of people, being mechanical in his understanding of the development of socialism, and not actively engaging the masses in the struggle for socialism. This critique closely followed the Anti-Rightist Campaign, in which Mao had sought to weed out those with contrary views to government.
- In 1966 the Sixteen Articles, repeatedly eulogized mass action, while simultaneously providing strict instructions for party leaders and citizenry alike.
- In the 1966 Cultural Revolution that followed, local mass activity was widespread in organizations such as the Red Guards, but was steered, in part, by the ideological leadership of Mao. This was evident in adherence to the philosophies of the Little Red Book.
- Other Chinese political campaigns during the 1960s exhibited high mass mobilization, steered by leadership.

By Mao's death on September 9, 1976, his own role had been elevated to the point that he had become the defining factor in the mass line.

In 1977, the new preeminent political leader of China, Deng Xiaoping, moved the country into decades of reform. While partially honouring the legacy of Mao in his 1981 Resolution on Certain Questions in the History of Our Party since the Founding of the People's Republic of China, Deng's leadership placed a lesser emphasis on Maoist egalitarianism and collectivism fundamental to mass line.

=== Xi Jinping ===
One of the distinctive features of the national leadership of Chinese Communist Party general secretary Xi Jinping has been the revival of the mass line in CCP theory and praxis. Xi describes the mass line as one of the three basic aspects of Mao Zedong Thought, along with "seeking truth from facts" and national independence/autonomy.

Xi's ideological contributions, described as Xi Jinping Thought, seek to reinvigorate the mass line. In 2013, Xi initiated the first of his Party's Education Programs on Selected Themes, which addressed the mass line. This program sought to address four types of harmful behaviors by party cadres and to require cadres to conduct self-examination and self-criticism in front of their subordinates and to solicit criticism from their subordinates.

As part of the campaign to reinvigorate the mass line, Xi states, "All Party organs and members should be frugal and make determined efforts to oppose ostentation and reject hedonism", although the interpretation of what this means seems to have varied from one province to the next somewhat. Hebei province reportedly reduced public spending on official receptions by 24%, cancelled the order of 17,000 new cars, and punished 2,750 government officials. The Economist reported two specific examples of punishments under the new mass line: the suspended death sentence for corruption given to Liu Zhijun and charging the 17-year-old-son of a high-ranking military officer for an alleged connection to a gang rape. Perhaps 20,000 party officials were punished within the first year of the revival campaign.

A new official website was launched, focusing on the mass line. Xi emphasizes that the Party should "march the mass line through the Internet." This campaign encouraged Party and government officials to increase their online presence and connect more closely with the public through "regularly go[ing] online to look around and understand what the masses think and want." Between 2012 and 2016, official Weibo accounts for agencies and officials increased from 60,064 to 152,390. By 2020, there were 164,522 such accounts.

As part of his emphasis on the mass line, Xi states that officials should "pay more grassroots visits to listen to opinions from the masses ... think like the masses ... spare no efforts in eliminating public grievances and safeguarding people's interests."

== Connection with propaganda ==
According to Steiner, the mass line is closely related to the CCP's propaganda apparatus. Despite the vast output from the CCP's propaganda apparatus, in January 1951 the Central Committee published a directive condemning as a "principal weakness of the Party's propaganda" a failure to effectively give "systematic guidance and control of various levels of party organizations".

The directive said that "One of the inborn duties of a Communist lies in the incessant effort to carry out propaganda among the people so as to educate them, to wage relentless war against all reactionary and mistaken conceptions and principles, and to promote as well as raise the political consciousness of the masses."

The directive called for the establishment of networks of "propaganda officers"—one in every party cell—and "reporting officers" at higher levels. Propaganda activity was to be conducted among the masses under strict control and in "fixed activity programs". Among other duties, propaganda officers were to maintain "constant public contact" so they could "assist the Party in the choice of propaganda matter and methods appropriate for different periods of time".

Earlier directives connected the need to boost consciousness of the mass line with criticisms and self-criticisms in the press. CCP members were supposed to "be trained to appreciate that criticism and self-criticism in newspapers and periodicals are necessary methods for strengthening the relations between the Party and the popular masses".

Academic Alexander Korolev argues that: "If implemented not as a propaganda tool but as a mechanism of interest articulation and aggregation, the mass line has the potential to offer China alternative routes of democratization."

== Mass organizations ==
During the Maoist era the state supported a range of mass organizations, coordinated by the CCP through its united front system. The most significant of the mass organizations encompassed large numbers of people from major social groups, including workers through trade unions, students, youth, and women. Their purpose was to "penetrate society, to bring vast sections of the population further into the party's net," Frederick Teiwes writes.

Organizations such as the All-China Women's Federation, All-China Federation of Trade Unions, and the Communist Youth League are a part of the CPC's mass line.

== See also ==
- Seek truth from facts
- General line of the party (Soviet Union)
