= Abolition of the lifetime tenure system for leading cadres =

Chinese policy created by Deng Xiaoping

The abolition of the lifetime tenure system for leading cadres (Chinese: 废除干部领导职务终身制; pinyin: Fèichú gànbù lǐngdǎo zhíwù zhōngshēn zhì) was a decision made by the Chinese Communist Party (CCP) in the 1980s under the leadership of Deng Xiaoping that marked the end of the lifelong tenure system for leaders during the leadership of Mao Zedong and established a term system and retirement system.

In 2018, the Chinese constitution was amended to remove the term limits for the president and the vice president. In October 2022, Xi Jinping secured a third term as CCP General Secretary.

== History ==
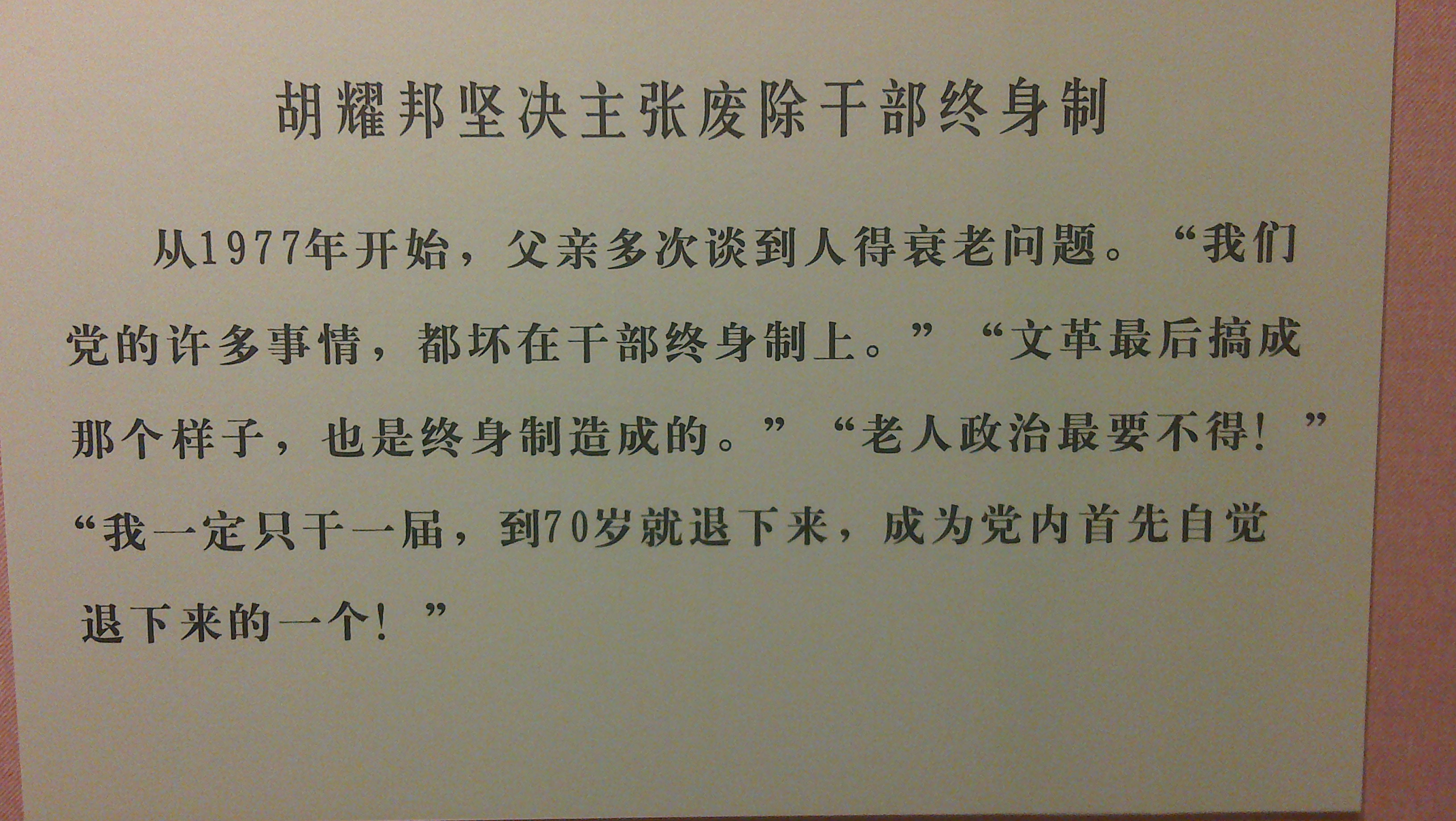
Former CCP General Secretary Hu Yaobang supported the abolition of the lifetime tenure system.

On 23 April 1980, the enlarged meeting of the Politburo of the Chinese Communist Party was held. The meeting adopted the "Decision on Old Comrades Who Have Lost Their Working Capacity Not Being Candidates for Delegates to the 12th National Congress and Members of the Central Committee" proposed by Deng Xiaoping. This marked the beginning of the abolition of the lifetime tenure system for leading cadres. On 18 August 1980, Deng delivered a speech entitled On the Reform of the System of Party and State Leadership (commonly known as the "August 18 Speech") at a conference, proposing that the various drawbacks of the current system, including bureaucracy, excessive concentration of power, paternalism, and the life-long tenure of leading cadres, must be reformed. The August 18 Speech also marked the beginning of the reform of China's political system in the 1980s.

In February 1982, the Central Committee and the State Council implemented a pilot retirement system, starting with enterprises and gradually extending it to the functional departments of party and government organs. In September 1982, the 12th Party National Congress passed a resolution to establish the Central Advisory Commission as a transitional institution to abolish the lifetime tenure system for leading cadres.

In December 1982, the fifth session of the 5th National People's Congress adopted the 1982 Constitution, which stipulated that the terms of office of state leaders such as the President, the Vice President, the Premier, the Vice Premier, the Chairman and Vice Chairpersons of the Standing Committee of the National People's Congress, the President of the Supreme People's Court, and the Procurator-General of the Supreme People's Procuratorate are the same as those of the National People's Congress and "no more than two consecutive terms in office", symbolizes the formal abolishment of the lifetime tenure system.

In 1987, before the 13th Party National Congress, Deng Xiaoping, Chen Yun, Li Xiannian and other elders agreed to retire and no longer hold any political positions. In October 1987, after the Party Congress. Deng resigned from the Central Committee and as the Chairman of the Central Advisory Commission and began to make arrangements for his retirement. On 16 June 1989, Deng Xiaoping gave a speech after the Tiananmen Square protests and massacre, mentioning that:

现在看起来，我的分量太重，对国家和党不利，有一天就会很危险。国际上好多国家把对华政策放在我是不是病倒了或者死去了上面。我多年来就意识到这个问题。一个国家的命运建立在一两个人的声望上面，是很不健康的，是很危险的。不出事没问题，一出事就不可收拾。

It now seems that I am too important, which is not good for the country and the party. One day, it will become very dangerous. Many countries in the world base their China policies on whether I fall ill or die. I have been aware of this problem for many years. It is unhealthy and dangerous to base the fate of a country on the reputation of one or two people. It is fine if nothing goes wrong, but once something goes wrong, it will get out of control.

In September of the same year, Deng Xiaoping talked with several top leaders, mainly to discuss his retirement, saying:

我过去多次讲，可能我最后的作用是带头建立退休制度。我已经慢慢练习如何过退休生活，工作了几十年，完全脱离总有个过程。下次党代表大会不搞顾问委员会了，还是搞退休制度。我退休的时间是不是就确定在五中全会……。退的方式，越简单越好。我多次讲，一个国家的命运寄托在一两个人的威望上是很不正常的。而利用退休又来歌功颂德一番，也没有什么好处。退休方式要简化，死后丧事也要简化。

I have said many times in the past that my final role may be to take the lead in establishing a retirement system. I have slowly practiced how to live a retired life. After working for decades, it takes time to completely get out of it. The next Party Congress will not have an advisory committee, but a retirement system. Will the time of my retirement be determined at the Fifth Plenary Session of the Central Committee? The simpler the way of retirement, the better. I have said many times that it is abnormal for the fate of a country to rest on the prestige of one or two people. And there is no benefit in using retirement to sing praises. The way of retirement should be simplified, and the funeral after death should also be simplified.

In November 1989, at the fifth plenary session of the 13th Central Committee, Deng Xiaoping resigned as the Chairman of the CCP Central Military Commission. The following year, he resigned as Chairman of the PRC Central Military Commission and officially retired, abolishing the lifelong tenure of leaders.

=== Seven up, eight down ===
In 2002, outgoing CCP General Secretary Jiang Zemin introduced the "seven up, eight down" rule, referring to the fact that if a Politburo Standing Committee member is 68 or older at the time of a Party Congress, he must retire, but if he is 67 or younger, he may still enter the committee.

=== Xi Jinping ===
In 2018, the Chinese constitution was amended to remove the term limits for the president and the vice president.
