= Special study session =

Gathering of the State Council of China

Special Study Session of the State Council
- Simplified Chinese: 国务院专题学习
- Traditional Chinese: 國務院專題學習
Transcriptions
Standard Mandarin
- Hanyu Pinyin: Guówùyuàn Zhuāntí Xuéxí

A special study session (Chinese: 专题学习; pinyin: Zhuāntí Xuéxí) is a periodic gathering of the State Council of the People's Republic of China. Special study sessions were established in March 2023, after an amendment to the State Council Work Regulations.

== List of special study sessions ==
The following table records the list special study sessions.

#	Date	Theme	Host	Explainer	Speaker	Ref.
1	23 April 2023	Completely, accurately and comprehensively implement the new concept for development and firmly grasp the primary task of high-quality development	Li Qiang	Wang Changlin (President of the Academy of Macroeconomic Research)	He Lifeng, Zhang Guoqing, Shen Yiqin	
2	9 June 2023	Thoroughly study and implement General Secretary Xi Jinping's important speeches and instructions on thematic education	Li Qiang	None	All Vice Premiers and State Councilors	
3	21 September 2023	Accelerate the development of the digital economy and promote the deep integration of digital technology and the real economy	Li Qiang	Chen Chun (Academic at the Academician of Chinese Academy of Engineering)	Ding Xuexiang, Zhang Guoqing, Liu Guozhong	
4	31 October 2023	Deeply implement the strategy of strengthening the country through intellectual property rights and effectively support innovation-driven development	Li Qiang	Yi Jiming (Professor at the Peking University)	Ding Xuexiang, Zhang Guoqing, Shen Yiqin	
5	20 December 2023	Create a market-oriented, law-based and internationalized first-class business environment, and continue to stimulate market vitality and social creativity	Li Qiang	Luo Peixin (Professor at East China University of Political Science and Law)	Ding Xuexiang, Wang Xiaohong, Wu Zhenglong	
6	26 February 2024	Establish and improve a fair competition system and accelerate the improvement of the basic system and rules of the national unified market	Li Qiang	Wang Yiming (Vice Chairman of China Center for International Economic Exchanges)	He Lifeng, Zhang Guoqing, Wu Zhenglong	
7	22 April 2024	Further deepen capital market reform and promote the stable and healthy development of the capital market	Li Qiang	Liu Qiao (Dean of Guanghua School of Management, Peking University)	Ding Xuexiang, Zhang Guoqing, Wang Xiaohong, He Lifeng (submitted written statements)	
8	5 June 2024	Deeply implement the State Council Organization Law and solidly promote the construction of a law-based government	Li Qiang	Ma Huaide (President of China University of Political Science and Law)	Ding Xuexiang, He Lifeng, Wu Zhenglong	
9	26 September 2024	Implement a national strategy to actively respond to population aging and promote the coordinated development of the elderly care industry and the elderly care industry	Li Qiang	Wu Yushao (Professor at Fudan University)	Zhang Guoqing, Wang Xiaohong, Shen Yiqin	
10	8 October 2024	Enhance the consistency of macroeconomic policy orientation, strengthen policy coordination and improve implementation effects	Li Qiang	Huang Hanquan (President of China Institute for Macroeconomic Studies)	Ding Xuexiang, Zhang Guoqing, Wang Xiaohong	
11	16 December 2024	Accelerate the implementation of the administrative discretion benchmark system and further improve the standardization of administrative law enforcement	Li Qiang	Hu Jianmiao (Professor at the Central Party School)	He Lifeng, Zhang Guoqing, Wu Zhenglong	
12	20 February 2025	Adhere to the combination of promoting consumption and benefiting people's livelihood, vigorously boost consumption and expand domestic demand	Li Qiang	Liu Yuanchun (President of Shanghai University of Finance and Economics)	Ding Xuexiang, He Lifeng, Shen Yiqin	
13	17 April 2025	Strengthen expectation management and coordinate policy implementation and expectation guidance	Li Qiang	Gao Peiyong (Academician of the Chinese Academy of Social Sciences)	He Lifeng, Zhang Guoqing, Wu Zhenglong	
14	9 June 2025	Break through bottlenecks in the transformation of sci-tech achievements, and promote innovation-driven development.	Li Qiang	Liu Qin (Director of Yangtze River Delta National Technology Innovation Center)	Zhang Guoqing, Liu Guozhong	
15	26 August 2025	Accelerate the innovative development of service trade and actively cultivate new drivers of foreign trade development	Li Qiang	Zhao Zhongxiu (President of the University of International Business and Economics)	He Lifeng, Wang Xiaohong, Chen Yiqin	
16	15 October 2025	Strengthen the guiding and safeguarding role of standards, and promote high-quality economic development through standard upgrading	Li Qiang	Li Aixian (Vice President of China National Institute of Standardization)	Ding Xuexiang, Zhang Guoqing, Liu Guozhong	

== See also ==
- Collective study session
