= Democratic life meeting =

Chinese Communist Party practice

A democratic life meeting (Chinese: 民主生活会; pinyin: Mínzhǔ Shēnghuó Huì) is a periodic gathering of cadres of the Chinese Communist Party (CCP) who engage in criticism and self-criticism. They are held in all levels of the CCP organization from the "grassroots" to the central leadership. It is unclear when these meetings began taking place. In 1987, CCP general secretary Hu Yaobang was ousted from power after a multi-day democratic life meeting held specifically to criticize him personally and his reform program more generally. They took place on an infrequent basis over the next few decades (some sources say, once every year).

== History ==
CCP general secretary Xi Jinping held a high-profile 'revival' of the democratic life meeting at the provincial party headquarters of Hebei province in September 2013. Xi has since used the meetings as venues to propagate the "mass line" education which was supposed to make CCP officials better serve the needs of ordinary people. The CCP Politburo itself was said to have held a four-day democratic life meeting in June 2013. Some scholars said that this was indication of a "Maoist revival" under Xi Jinping.

By 2014, democratic life meetings were taking place across China at all levels of the CCP organization. While state media has lauded the meetings as 'cleansing' the party of its problems, critics have called it a largely meaningless political exercise without public transparency, with many officials making canned remarks about superficial issues and ignoring the real problems. Lower level officials have reported reluctance by some participants to speak the truth at the meetings for fear of contents being used against them later on.

The Politburo held a two-day long democratic life meeting in December 2015. It was the first time such a meeting was held in a high-profile fashion at the Politburo level since the downfall of Hu Yaobang. In December 2018, the 25 members of the Politburo assembled for a democratic life meeting chaired by Xi Jinping.

== See also ==
- Organization of the Chinese Communist Party
- Yan'an Rectification Movement
