= Seven up, eight down =

Chinese Communist Party norm

- Chinese: 七上八下
Transcriptions
Standard Mandarin
- Hanyu Pinyin: Qī shàng bā xià

Seven up, eight down is an informal rule within the Chinese Communist Party (CCP) that if a Politburo or Politburo Standing Committee member is 68 or older at the time of a party congress, he must retire, but if he is 67 or younger, he may still enter the committee.

== History ==
The informal rule was introduced in 2002 by outgoing CCP general secretary Jiang Zemin.

In October 2016, Deng Maosheng, a director within the Central Policy Research Office, dismissed what the seven up, eight down rule existed, stating "The strict boundaries of ‘seven up, eight down’ don’t exist" and adding "This is something from folklore, and cannot be trusted".

The informal rule was broken three times following the 20th CCP National Congress in 2022. Xi Jinping, aged 69, was re-elected as general secretary of the CCP Central Committee. Additionally, Zhang Youxia, aged 72, was re-elected to the Politburo while Wang Yi, aged 68, was also elected. Other than Xi, Zhang and Wang, the seven up, eight down rule was observed.

== See also ==
- Abolition of the lifetime tenure system for leading cadres
