= Yasheng Huang =

American professor of management

- 黄亚生
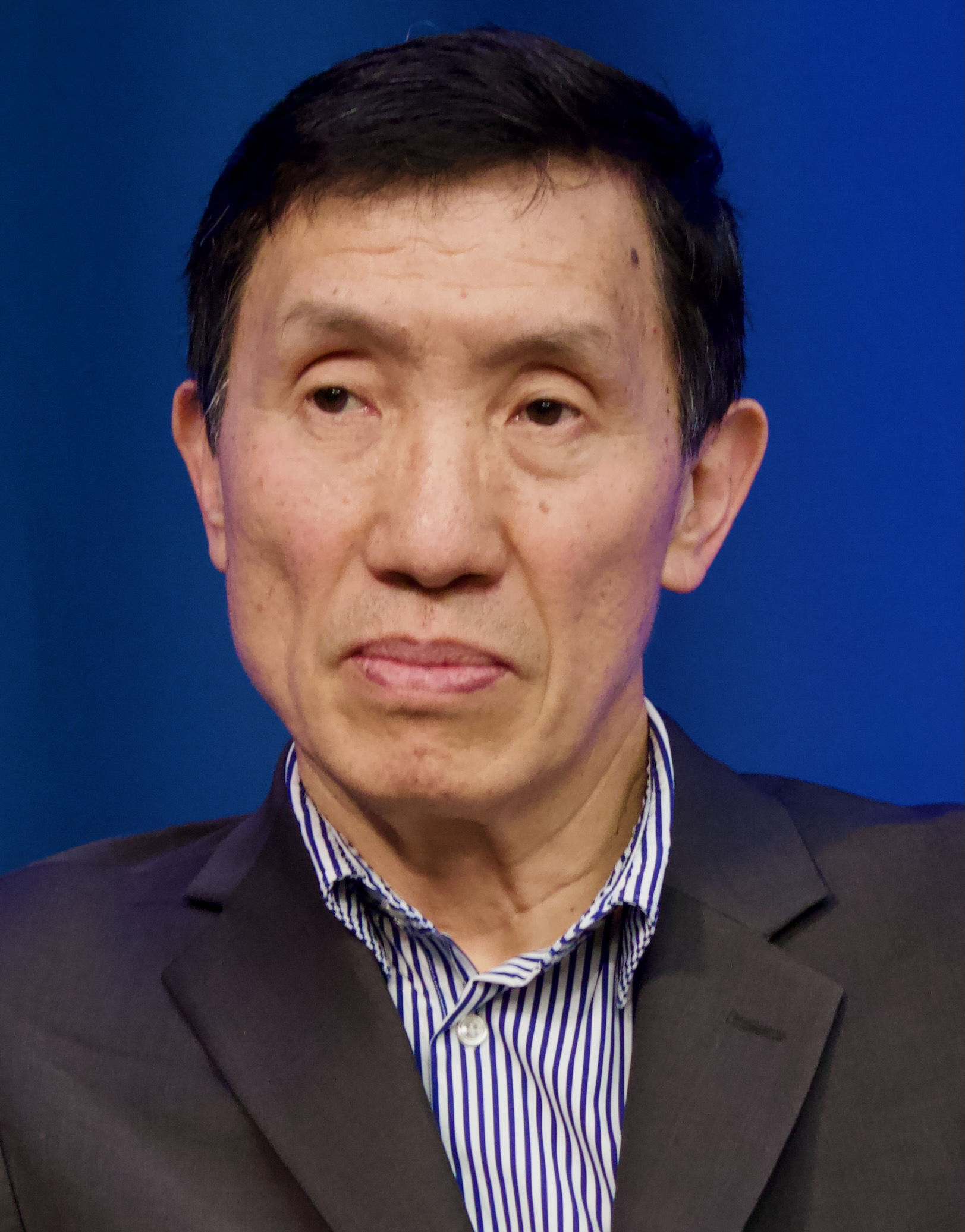
- Huang at Asia Society in 2025
- Born: Beijing, China
- Citizenship: United States
- Education: Harvard University (BA, PhD)
- Occupations: Author, professor
- Scientific career
- Fields: Political science
- Workplaces: University of Michigan; Harvard Business School; MIT Sloan School of Management
- Thesis: The politics of inflation control in China: Provincial responses to central investment policies, 1977–1989 (1991)

Yasheng Huang (Chinese: 黄亚生) is an American professor of international management at the MIT Sloan School of Management, where he holds the Epoch Foundation chair. His research focuses on human capital formation, political economy, and comparative development in China and India.

== Early life and education ==
Huang was born in Beijing, China. He later moved to the United States for higher education, attending Harvard University, where he received a Bachelor of Arts in government in 1985 and a Doctor of Philosophy in government in 1991. His doctoral dissertation examined provincial responses to central investment policies during the reform era.

== Career ==
While completing his doctorate, Huang worked as a World Bank consultant and as an associate professor at the University of Michigan from 1987 to 1989. In 1997 he joined Harvard Business School as an associate professor in business, government, and international economics. He joined the MIT Sloan School of Management as a faculty member in 2003, where he founded and directs the China Lab and India Lab.

Huang is a member of the Task Force on U.S.–China Policy convened by the Asia Society's Center on U.S.–China Relations. In March 2025 he joined the Center for China Analysis at Asia Society as a non-resident honorary senior fellow, focusing on the Chinese economy and technology.

== Research ==
Huang's scholarship examines the political economy of China and India, with particular attention to the role of foreign direct investment, financial liberalization, and human capital in development. His work has appeared in The Wall Street Journal, The Economist, and academic journals in economics and management.

In a 2003 article for Foreign Policy, he and co-author Tarun Khanna analyzed the contrasting development strategies of China and India, arguing that India's homegrown entrepreneurship and stronger capital markets might allow it to catch up with or eventually surpass China, despite China's faster headline GDP growth and larger inflows of FDI. In a 2024 reflection, Huang strongly defended the article, emphasizing that the original claims were widely misunderstood, downplaying the absence of a timeline for India surpassing China, and framing any errors as contingent on unforeseeable policy changes.

His 2008 book Capitalism with Chinese Characteristics argued that rural entrepreneurship drove China's early economic growth, and that a subsequent shift toward urban, state-led capitalism undermined that progress.

His most recent book The Rise and Fall of the EAST (2023) offered a long-run historical account of how China's examination system, autocratic governance, and emphasis on stability shaped its economic trajectory.
