= Socialist transformation of ownership of the means of production =

Process in China (1953–1956)

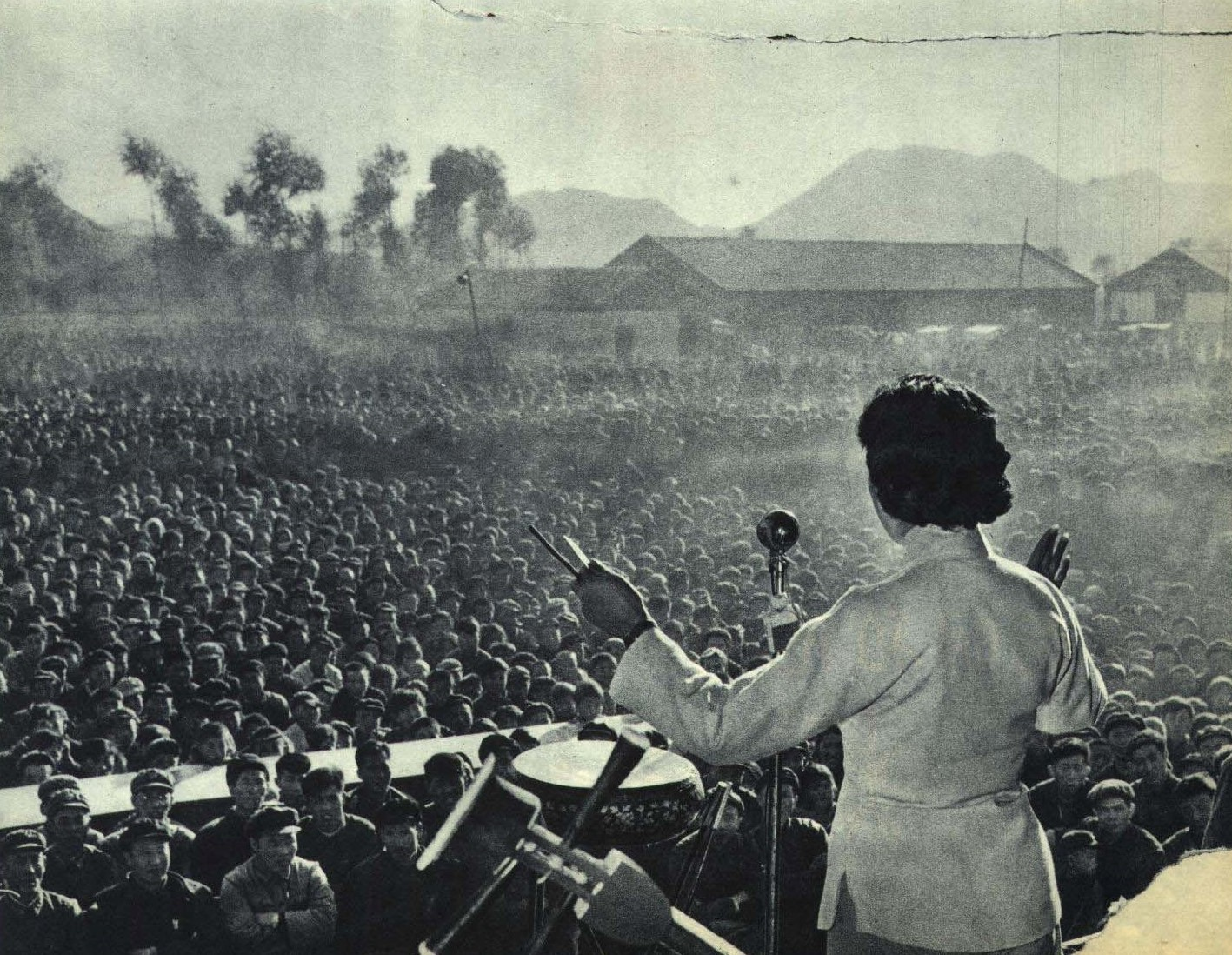
Cultural performances at the 10th anniversary celebration of the collectivization of the Jianming People's Commune in Xipu Village, Jianming Town, Zunhua County, Hebei Province in 1962

The socialist transformation of ownership of the means of production is a Chinese Communist Party slogan that refers to the gradual transformation of the ownership of the means of production carried out by the People's Republic of China (PRC) from 1953 to 1956, including the general line of the transition period. It mainly included the socialist transformation of agriculture, the socialist transformation of handicrafts, and the socialist transformation of capitalist industry and commerce, collectively known in the PRC as the Three Great Transformations (三大改造). Its purpose was to change the relations of production to serve socialism.

By the end of 1956, the Three Great Transformations were basically completed, and the socialist system (economic aspect) was basically established in China. This period is considered to be the primary stage of socialism in China. In 1981, Deng Xiaoping first explicitly proposed this concept in the Resolution on Certain Questions in the History of Our Party since the Founding of the People's Republic of China, and summarized it as an important component of Deng Xiaoping Theory.

== History ==
Documentary titled "The Direction of 500 Million Peasants," produced in 1955, documents the agricultural collectivization movement.

The socialist transformation of agriculture was also called the Agricultural Collectivization Movement, which was modeled after the Soviet Union in establishing cooperatives. Starting in December 1951, the Central Committee of the Chinese Communist Party issued a series of resolutions, which stipulated the route, principles and policies of China's agricultural socialist transformation. The agricultural collectivization movement was roughly divided into three stages: the first stage was from October 1949 to 1953, which focused on establishing "mutual aid groups" and at the same time piloting primary forms of agricultural cooperatives; the second stage was from 1954 to the first half of 1955, in which "primary cooperatives" were established and developed throughout China; In mid-1955, there was a disagreement within the CCP regarding whether the pace of promoting collectivization should be slowed down or accelerated, and in the end, Mao Zedong's policy of accelerating the pace was implemented; the third stage was from the second half of 1955 to the end of 1956, which was also the period of the fastest pace of promoting agricultural collectivization. By the end of 1956, the agricultural socialist transformation had been basically completed after going through the three stages of "mutual aid groups," "primary cooperatives," and "advanced cooperatives," and 96.3% of farmers nationwide had joined cooperatives. The socialist transformation of handicrafts began in November 1953 and ended at the end of 1956, with more than 90% of handicraftsmen nationwide joining cooperatives.

The socialist transformation of capitalist industry and commerce was carried out in full from 1954 to the end of 1956. The CCP adopted the policy of "peaceful redemption" and gradually transformed them into socialist public enterprises through state capitalism. Moreover, it "combined the transformation of ownership with the transformation of people and strived to make the exploiters into self-reliant laborers." The "peaceful redemption" was divided into the public-private partnership of the whole industry and went through the stage of "four-way profit sharing" to "fixed interest." Before the public-private partnership of the whole industry, the profits of private enterprises were distributed according to "national income tax, enterprise reserve fund, employee welfare bonus, and dividends of the capitalists", of which "dividends of the capitalists" accounted for about 1/4 of the total profits. After the entire industry was jointly owned by the public and private sectors, the redemption adopted a fixed-interest system, that is, within a certain period, the state paid capitalists a certain interest rate through a professional company, which was 0.5% per annum; individual enterprises that needed to increase the interest rate could exceed 0.5%; for joint public-private enterprises that had already adopted the fixed-interest method, if the annual interest rate was less than 0.5%, it should be increased to 0.5%; if the interest rate had exceeded 0.5%, it would not be reduced.

== Reactions ==
Since 1955, farmers and handicraft workers across mainland China have demanded to "withdraw from cooperatives" (exit agricultural or handicraft cooperatives). In Guangdong alone, more than 70,000 farmers have withdrawn from cooperatives, 102 cooperatives have collapsed, and more than 127,000 households are currently protesting withdrawal. In 1956–1957, the movement to withdraw from cooperatives reached its peak and was extremely large in scale. For example, according to incomplete statistics from nine counties including Fengcheng and Changtu in Liaoning, more than 10,000 households protested withdrawal and more than 4,000 households had already withdrawn. In Jiangsu, cooperatives with the phenomenon of withdrawing from cooperatives accounted for 43% in Xinyi County, 50% in Zhengji District of Tongshan County, and 57.5% in Shuyang County. Among them, the policies of "unified purchase and sale" and "cooperativeization" are the direct reasons for farmers' dissatisfaction. First, the advanced cooperatives failed to fulfill their promise to increase the income of the farmers who joined the cooperatives. On the contrary, the income of farmers in many areas was reduced. Second, farmers lost their traditional freedom. They could not move outwards and were restricted from engaging in sideline businesses. Third, cadres abused their power and acted arbitrarily, including arbitrarily disciplining members and even arbitrarily binding and beating members.

== Analysis ==
Some Chinese and Western scholars believe that agricultural collectivization weakened farmers' motivation to produce; rural bureaucratic management and non-market methods distorted resource allocation and inhibited the improvement of productivity; the pursuit of food self-sufficiency hindered the rural areas from moving towards division of labor and mutual exchange. Most importantly, agriculture accounted for a relatively low proportion of national investment.

Lin Yifu analyzed it using game theory and believed that agricultural collectivization changed from voluntary to mandatory in the autumn of 1958, and the original repeated game became a single game, which caused a decline in agricultural output during the three years of hardship.
