= On the Reform of the System of Party and State Leadership =

1980 speech by Deng Xiaoping

- Simplified Chinese: 党和国家领导制度的改革
- Traditional Chinese: 黨和國家領導制度的改革
Transcriptions
Standard Mandarin
- Hanyu Pinyin: Dǎng hé Guójiā Lǐngdǎo Zhìdù de Gǎigé

The On the Reform of the System of Party and State Leadership was a speech by Chinese leader Deng Xiaoping on 18 August 1980 regarding the reform of Chinese Communist Party (CCP) and state structures.

== History ==
On 18 August 1980, Deng Xiaoping delivered a speech entitled On the Reform of the System of Party and State Leadership at a conference, proposing that the various drawbacks of the current system, including bureaucracy, excessive concentration of power, paternalism, and the life-long tenure of leading cadres, must be reformed. The August 18 Speech also marked the beginning of the reform of China's political system in the 1980s.
