= General line of the party =

Directives of the (usually communist) party in Marxist-Leninist states

In the terminology of communist states and Marxism–Leninism, the general line of the party or simply the general line is the directives of the governing bodies of a party (usually a communist party) which define the party's politics. The term (Russian: Генеральная линия партии general'naya liniya partii) was in common use by the Communist Party of the Soviet Union (since its early days under other names) and also adopted by many other communist parties around the world. The notion is rooted in the major principle of democratic centralism, which requires unconditional obedience to collective decisions.

== Soviet Union ==
The term has acquired a significant notoriety in the context of Soviet political repressions, where deviations from the general line have led to severe punishment. The introduction to a collection of documents from the Stalinist era says that general line statements produced by the Stalinist leadership were written with great care and exact phrasing in prescribed terminology and with established slogans.

The goal was to provide a means of political and social control. Once the Central Committee formulated a statement about the party line on a particular issue, it was republished in major newspapers, such as Pravda. Disagreements with the party line were treated as a political crime: anti-Soviet agitation.

== See also ==
- Mass line
- Party line (politics)
