= Li Qiang =

Premier of China since 2023

- 李强
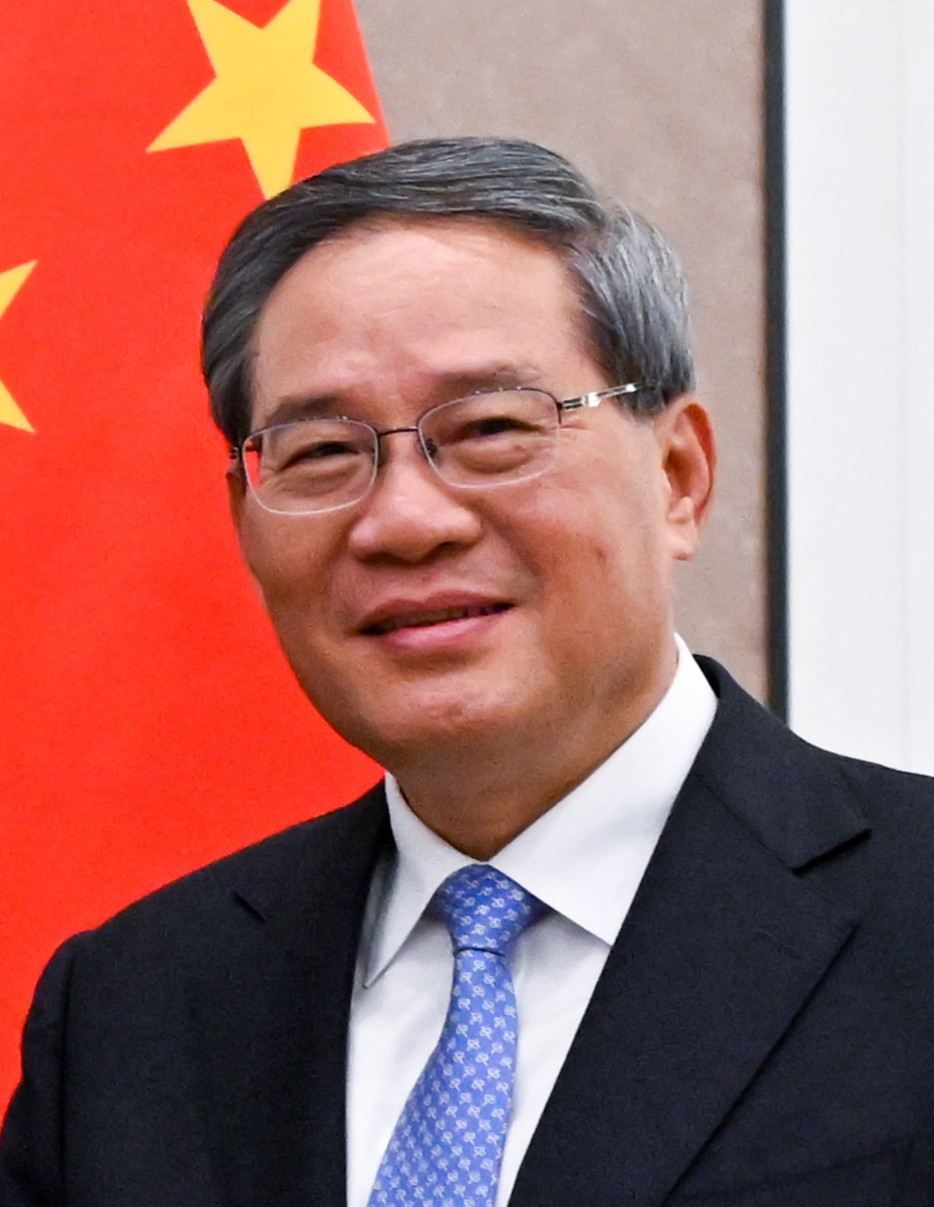
- Li in 2025

Premier of China
- Incumbent
- Assumed office 11 March 2023
- President: Xi Jinping
- Vice Premier: Ding Xuexiang; He Lifeng; Zhang Guoqing; Liu Guozhong
- Preceded by: Li Keqiang

Party Secretary of Shanghai
- In office 29 October 2017 – 28 October 2022
- Mayor: Ying Yong; Gong Zheng
- Preceded by: Han Zheng
- Succeeded by: Chen Jining

Party Secretary of Jiangsu
- In office 30 June 2016 – 29 October 2017
- Governor: Shi Taifeng; Wu Zhenglong
- Preceded by: Luo Zhijun
- Succeeded by: Lou Qinjian

Governor of Zhejiang
- In office 21 December 2012 (Note: Acting: 21 December 2012 – 30 January 2013) – 4 July 2016
- Party Secretary: Xia Baolong
- Preceded by: Xia Baolong
- Succeeded by: Che Jun

Personal details
- Born: July 1959 (age 67) Rui'an, Zhejiang, China
- Party: Chinese Communist Party
- Education: Zhejiang Agricultural University; Zhejiang University; Central Party School; Hong Kong Polytechnic University (MBA)

Chinese name
- Traditional Chinese: 李強
- Simplified Chinese: 李强
Transcriptions
Standard Mandarin
- Hanyu Pinyin: Lǐ Qiáng
- Gwoyeu Romatzyh: Lii Chyang
- Wade–Giles: Li Ch'iang
other Mandarin
- Xiao'erjing: لِي چْيَانْق
Yue: Cantonese
- Jyutping: Lei5 Koeng4
- Li Qiang's voice Li answering questions on China-US relationship at a press conference during the National People's Congress; Recorded 13 March 2023

Li Qiang (Chinese: 李强; pinyin: Lǐ Qiáng; born July 1959) is a Chinese politician who is the premier of China and the second-ranking member of the Politburo Standing Committee of the Chinese Communist Party (CCP).

Li joined the CCP in 1983, and first worked in the Communist Youth League in Rui'an. Later serving in provincial department of civil affairs, he became the party secretary of Yongkang in 1996, the party secretary of Wenzhou in 2002, the Political Legal Affairs Secretary of Zhejiang in 2011 and later the deputy party secretary of the province. He served as the governor of Zhejiang from 2012 to 2016, later serving as the party secretary of Jiangsu from 2016 to 2017. In 2017, he was elevated to become a member of the CCP Politburo. He subsequently served as the party secretary of Shanghai from 2017 to 2022. During his tenure in Shanghai, he pursued pro-business policies and handled the response to the COVID-19 pandemic.

In 2022, he was promoted to the Politburo Standing Committee. In 2023, he became premier, succeeding Li Keqiang. During his tenure, Li oversaw a strengthening of the premier's position, and has handled the economy of China. Having served together with current CCP general secretary Xi Jinping in Zhejiang, Li is considered part of the New Zhijiang Army, the party faction of Xi Jinping, the CCP general secretary and top leader since 2012. The close relationship started in the mid-2000s when both held party positions in Zhejiang Province. Li is generally regarded by observers as pro-business and has voiced support for economic reforms.

== Early life and education ==
Li was born in the city of Rui'an, Zhejiang, in July 1959 in his maternal grandfather's house. Li's father, Li Xiju (李锡局), came from a poor family in Dong'ao Village, Caocun Town and worked as a government clerk and cadre when he grew up. His mother, Ruan Xiulian (阮秀莲), was from the township of Mayu (马屿镇), Rui'an, and made a living by selling pork when she was young. In his youth, Li was cared for by his maternal grandmother and other elders. He finished primary and secondary school in Mayu. He became a worker in the Irrigation Pump Station of Mayu in July 1976 at the age of 17 after graduating from secondary school, working there until 1977, and worked in the Third Tool Factory of Rui'an from 1977 to 1978.

Li Qiang studied agricultural mechanization at the Ningbo Branch of Zhejiang Agricultural University (Note: His earlier resume claimed that he "graduated from Zhejiang Agricultural University (now Zhejiang University)". The Ningbo Branch of Zhejiang Agricultural University was a satellite independent college operated under the prefix of Zhejiang Agricultural University. It was renamed Zhejiang Wanli Vocational Technical College in 1999 and Zhejiang Wanli College in 2002.) from 1978 to 1982. He studied sociology by correspondence at the private China Sociology Correspondence University (中国社会学函授大学; defunct in 2021) in Beijing from 1985 to 1987.

Li attended Zhejiang University for on-the-job graduate studies in management engineering from 1995 to 1997 and the Central Party School for on-the-job graduate studies in world economics from 2001 to 2004. He attended Hong Kong Polytechnic University from 2003 to 2005 and received an executive Master of Business Administration (MBA) in 2005.

== Early career ==
Li joined the Chinese Communist Party (CCP) in April 1983. He worked as a clerk at the Rui'an County Committee of the Communist Youth League of China (CYLC) from 1982 to 1983, and later as the secretary of the committee from 1983 to 1984. He then served in progressively senior roles in the provincial department of civil affairs. He first served as the deputy division head and then division head of the Rural Relief Division of the Zhejiang Provincial Civil Affairs Department from 1984 to 1991. He then served as the director of the Civil Affairs Department's Personnel Division from 1991 to 1992, and finally as the deputy head of the Civil Affairs Department from 1992 to 1996.

In 1996, he became a member of the Party Standing Committee of the prefecture-level city of Jinhua and the Party secretary of the city of county-level city of Yongkang (which is part of Jinhua). In 1998, he was reappointed as the deputy director of the Zhejiang Provincial Government's General Office. In 2000, he became the director and party secretary of the Zhejiang Provincial Government's Bureau of Administration for Industry and Commerce.

In 2002, he was appointed as the party secretary of the prefecture-level city of Wenzhou. By then he was only 43, and was the youngest party secretary of Wenzhou in history. During his tenure in Wenzhou, he supported the development of private businesses in the city. He also gave support to light industry, aiming to create an "international light industry city".

In 2004, Li became the secretary-general of Zhejiang Provincial Party Committee and earned a seat on its Standing Committee in the next year, serving under then Zhejiang's party secretary, Xi Jinping, in charge of administration and coordination. During this time, he became close to Xi, eventually being regarded as a close ally of him. During this time, Li accompanied Xi in numerous work trips, helped edit his speeches and helped draft Xi's policies. Li was credited with helping draft and clarify Xi's Double Eight Strategy, which listed eight comparative advantages of Zhejiang and eight corresponding actions to improve the province. Due to his association with Xi, Li is considered to be part of the New Zhijiang Army, a group of officials who worked with Xi in Zhejiang.

Guangming Daily in 2015 noted that, during his tenure in Zhejiang, Li told a professor at Zhejiang University that the province's local government needed an "independent think-tank like the RAND Corporation" to evaluate its performance, saying that it was "very difficult" for official organizations and officials to give objective analysis and criticize their superiors. This led the professor to establish a non-governmental group of experts in 2009, with Li as its honorary director. In February 2011, he became the Political and Legal Affairs Secretary of Zhejiang province, and several months later was made deputy party secretary.

== Local tenures ==
=== Zhejiang (2012–2016) ===
After the 18th CCP National Congress, he became an alternate of the CCP Central Committee. On 21 December 2012, he became the acting governor of Zhejiang, succeeding Xia Baolong who was promoted to the provincial party secretary, and was officially elected as governor by the Zhejiang Provincial People's Congress on January 30, 2013. During his tenure in Zhejiang, he asked the non-governmental group of experts to write reports on his performance that "tell the truth", and later paid them a visit for a face-to-face feedback after feeling their first reports weren't critical enough. Li also pursued reforms to the administrative review and approval system in Zhejiang.

In 2014, when Zhejiang was preparing to hold an international internet conference, Li proposed that the host city turn into a pilot zone for unblocking China's strict internet controls for Western firms, an idea that was ultimately not approved by the central leadership. He also started a project to create "characteristic towns", small towns focused on one type of business that have a pro-business climate and good physical environments. These included "Dream Town" for tech entrepreneurs and "Chocolate Town" for chocolate producers, both located in Zhejiang. This project was endorsed and spread to rest of China by Xi. The Economist reported in 2023 that "many such towns became speculative hotspots for housing developers, and the kinds of businesses they were supposed to cultivate sometimes failed to take off".

=== Jiangsu (2016–2017) ===
On 30 June 2016, Li was named party secretary of Jiangsu. He was removed as Zhejiang governor on 4 July 2016, when he was succeeded by Che Jun. He served for 15 months, becoming the shortest serving Jiangsu party secretary in the history of the People's Republic. In his first month, Li conducted 12 field surveys, covering northern, central, and southern Jiangsu. During his tenure, he arranged meetings with business officials such as Jack Ma of Alibaba Group to encourage investments.

=== Shanghai (2017–2022) ===
Following the first plenary session of the 19th CCP Central Committee, held after the closing day of the 19th Party Congress in October 2017, Li was elected to the Politburo. On 29 October 2017, Li was appointed as the party secretary of Shanghai, becoming the first official to govern Zhejiang, Jiangsu and Shanghai. He is considered to be "business-friendly", having implemented pro-business policies while in Shanghai such as the opening of the Shanghai Stock Exchange STAR Market. He oversaw increasing foreign investment in the city, including the gigafactory of Tesla, Inc. He has also implemented policies like lowering the threshold for internal migrants to obtain residency permits and creating five new towns to lessen the land supply shortage. In August 2018, he oversaw the inauguration of the Shanghai Financial Court.

In early 2022, Shanghai implemented a two-month COVID-19 lockdown in Shanghai, which significantly impacted the economy, leading Li to be blamed for the handling. Nevertheless, reportedly he was more open to the idea with living with COVID. There were also views that Li was pressured from the Central leadership to implement a lockdown, and that initially, Li had adhered strictly to the guidelines of leading epidemiologists in China, including Zhang Wenhong, who maintained a 'flexible strategy' on anti-Covid measures. It is also said that Li and Zhang had a good personal relationship, as the two were both from Rui'an, a city under the Wenzhou prefecture. According to The Wall Street Journal, Li is one of the few people in the top leadership that wants China to introduce Western mRNA vaccines against COVID-19. Reportedly, he tried to arrange for BioNTech to provide its vaccines in China.

== Premiership (2023–) ==
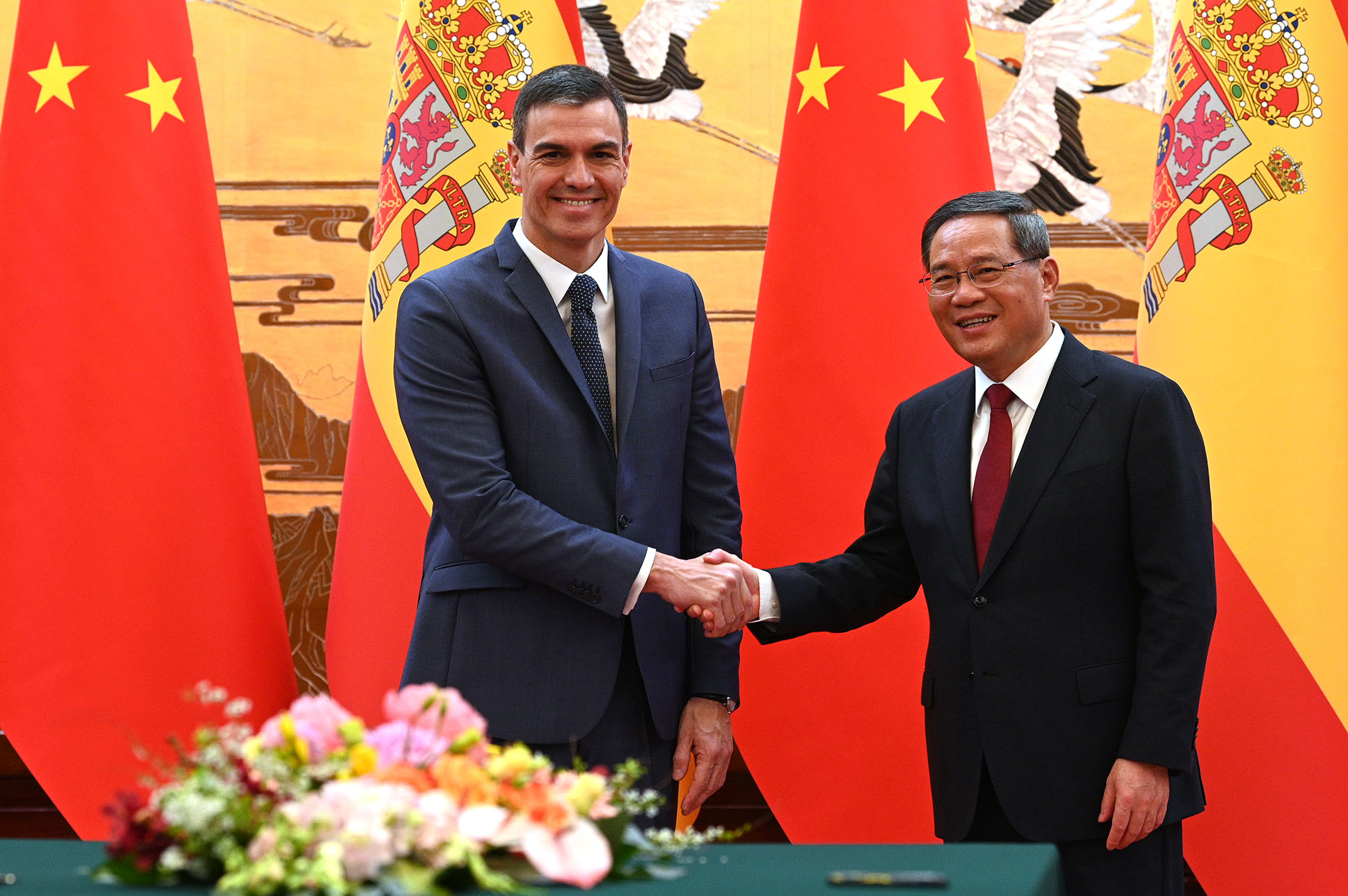
Li and Spanish Prime Minister Pedro Sánchez on 30 March 2023

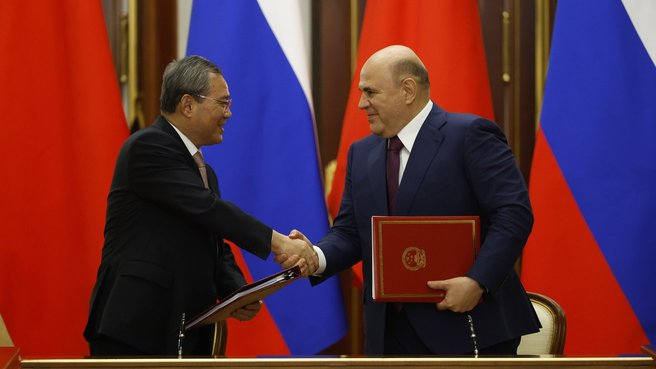
Li and Russian Prime Minister Mikhail Mishustin on 21 August 2024

Following the first plenary session of the 20th CCP Central Committee, held after the closing day of the 20th Party Congress in October 2022, Li was elected to the CCP Politburo Standing Committee as its second-ranking member. Effectively putting him on track to become the premier, observers speculated that the lack of Central Government experience would make him heavily dependent on support from Xi to run the State Council. On 28 October, he was succeeded by Chen Jining as the party secretary of Shanghai. Reuters reported on 3 March 2023, citing sources, that Li pushed for the quick relaxation of zero-COVID rules in late 2022, resisting pressure from Xi, who wanted to slow the pace of the reopening. It also reported that Li had become the head of the CCP's COVID taskforce, and had also encouraged local governments to continue loosening COVID restrictions.

In December 2022, Li attended the opening ceremony of the 13th National Congress of the All-China Federation of Industry and Commerce and gave a speech "on behalf of the Communist Party's Central Committee and the State Council", hinting at his role in the State Council. Li was appointed as premier by the National People's Congress on 11 March after being nominated by President Xi Jinping during the first session of the 14th National People's Congress, taking over from Li Keqiang. He is the first person since Zhou Enlai to rise directly to premiership from local government without any prior working experience in the central government, especially as a vice premier.

=== Domestic policy ===
Since becoming the premier, Li has attempted to reassure private entrepreneurs and restore confidence after the damage caused by zero-COVID restrictions, lifted in December 2022, and regulatory campaigns undertaken by the government; he also reportedly persuaded Alibaba Group founder Jack Ma to return to China after he spent a year overseas. Special study sessions of the State Council, similar to the Politburo collective study sessions, were established under Li Qiang in March 2023, after an amendment to the State Council Work Regulations. The new rules also re-established the Premier's Work Meeting, abolished in 2003, and reduced the frequency of executive meetings of the State Council. Li has held more plenary meetings of the State Council compared to his predecessors Wen Jiabao and Li Keqiang. Though these meetings previously focused mostly on formalities, Li has used them to issue more authoritative instructions.

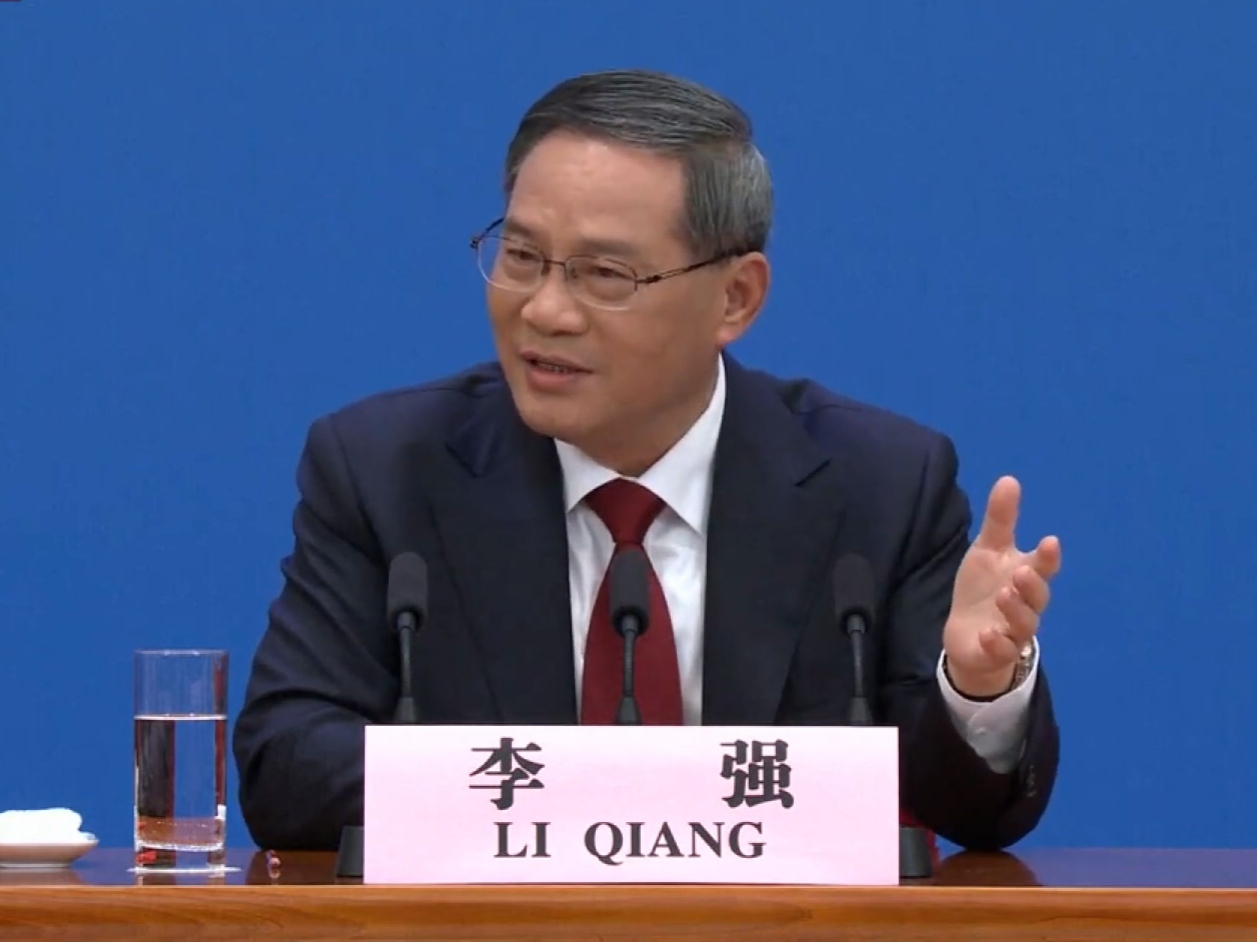
Li meets the press after the closing of the first session of the 14th National People's Congress at the Great Hall of the People in Beijing, March 13, 2023

At his first press conference on 13 March 2023, Li said businesses of all forms of ownership would be treated equally, and mentioned China's economic strengths. On 27 March 2023, he attended the China Development Forum, where he said that China will "unswervingly stick to opening up". He also met many foreign business executives, including Tim Cook of Apple Inc. and Ray Dalio of Bridgewater Associates, who made their first trip to China since the zero-COVID policy ended. In July 2023, China ended its increased regulatory efforts in the technology sector and Li met with representatives of major tech companies to convey the "strongest signal" in support of the industry. Central government bodies and numerous local governments then introduces policy support for the platform economy designed to increase economic growth and the creation of jobs. During a meeting of the State Council in August 2023, Li called for more efforts to reach China's annual growth target. In September 2023, Li visited several technology companies including Beijing U-Precision Technology, where he called on for technological self reliance. In November 2023, Li Qiang was appointed as the head of the Central Financial Commission, a newly established CCP body overseeing the financial sector.

In January 2024, Li called for "forceful" methods to stabilize the Chinese stock market after it registered deep declines. He visited Hubei province in the same month in a trip to emphasize technological independence, where he visited Yangtze Memory Technologies, the Wuhan University, water conservancy projects, a chemical company focusing on green development in Yichang and a battery industrial estate set up by Guangdong Brunp Recycling Technology, a subsidiary of CATL. In the same month, he also visited Shaanxi province, where he paid a trip to Shaanxi Fast Auto Drive Group, the ESWIN Technology Group, a manufacturer of semiconductors used in cars, and Western Superconducting Technologies, full-process producer of niobium-titanium ingot rods; he called on manufacturers to increase investments in research and development. In March 2024, it was announced that the Press Conference of the Premierwould be canceled for the current National People's Congress session, bringing an end to an event held since 1993. In the same month, Li addressed the China Development Forum, where he praised China's economy and promised to lower barriers for foreign businesses. In July 2024, during a symposium with heads of state-owned enterprises, private entrepreneurs and economists, he said China's economy was in "stable operation", while calling for "scientific policy decisions". In August 2024, during a meeting of the State Council, he called on China to introduce policies that are "tangible, effective and accessible to both the public and businesses". In December 2024, he warned local governments to not target private enterprises with unfair fines. The same month, he visited Hangzhou, Shaoxing and Jiaxing in Zhejiang province, where he promised to "steadily expand" access to foreign-invested companies.

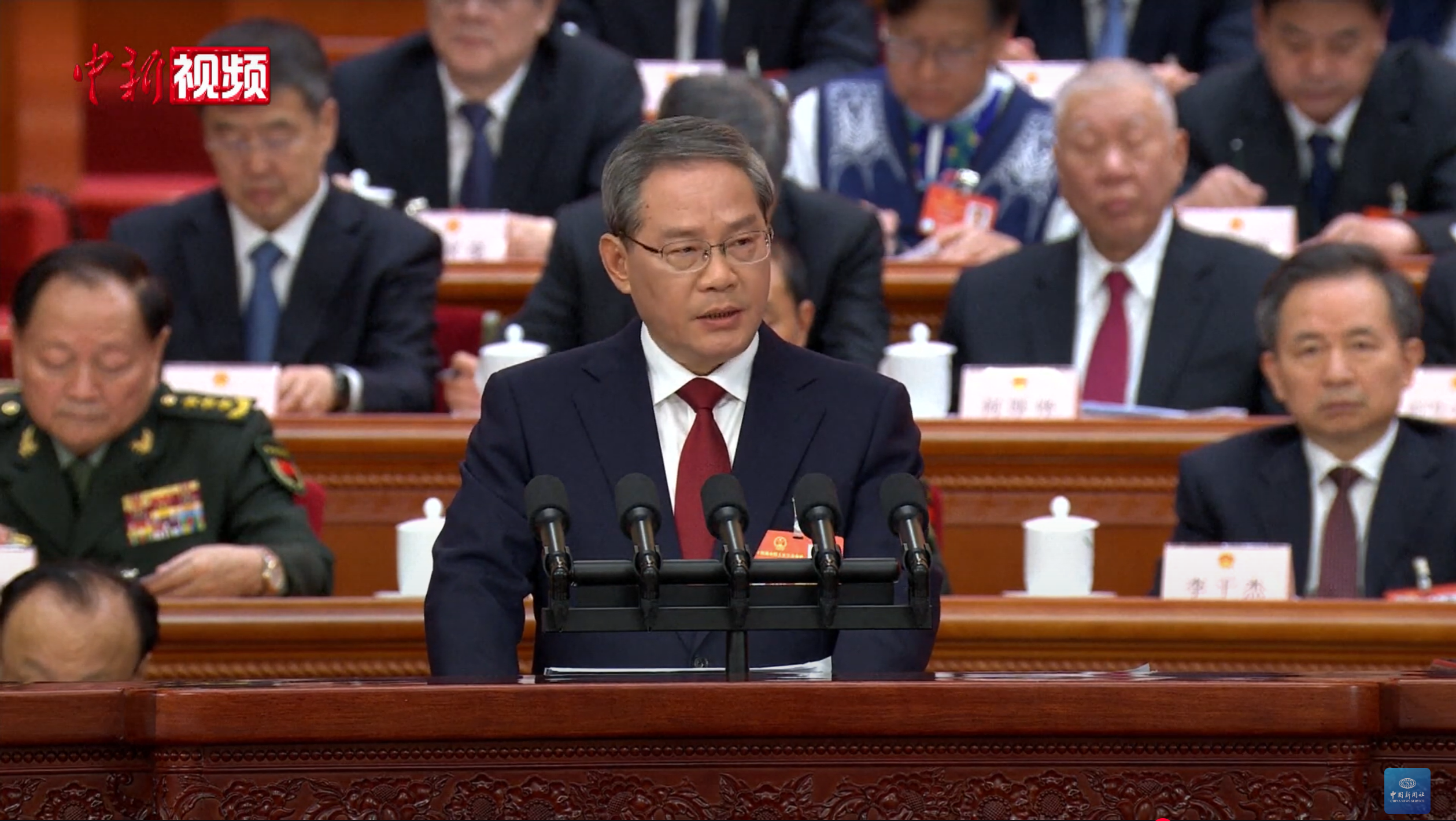
Li delivering a report on the work of the government to the National Peoples Congress on March 5, 2025

In January 2025, Li visited Shandong province, where he called on officials to expand trade-in programmes to boost consumption, expand charging and battery-swapping infrastructure due to the increasing number of new electric vehicles, and accelerate in the building of infrastructure and livelihood projects, including sports venues and modern water networks. In February 2025, he held a plenary meeting of the State Council, where he called on officials to "turn pressure into motivation". In the same month, during a meeting of the State Council, Li said China would adopt targeted policies to increase domestic consumption. He later also visited the research centers of China Telecom, China Unicom and China Mobile, China's three state-owned telecom service providers, calling on them to increase innovation. In March 2025, Li visited Fujian, where he called on foreign trade enterprises to diversify their markets, innovate trade channels, boost product competitiveness and increase the integration of domestic and foreign trade. In the same month, he gave the opening address of the China Development Forum, where he said China has preparations for "unexpected shocks".

In April 2025, Li held a symposium with economists and entrepreneurs, where he said China should "respond to the uncertainties of the external environment with strong and effective policies". In the same month, he called for greater support for domestic consumption. In June 2025, Li attended a ceremony to swear in 49 newly appointed central government officials, where he said that the "task to comprehensively promote the Chinese path to modernisation with high-quality development is heavy and difficult, with the external situation remaining complex and severe". In the same month, he took a three-day visit to Jiangsu, where he called on for further policies on technology, trade and increasing consumption. In July 2025, Li visited Tibet, where he officially announced the launch of the Yarlung Zangbo hydropower project. In the same month, he attended the World Artificial Intelligence Conference, where he talked against "technological monopolies" in AI, which he said would lead the technology to be an "exclusive game for a few countries and companies", and proposed a "world AI co-operation organisation". In November 2025, Li gave remarks at the opening of the China International Import Expo (CIIO), where he called on the world to "embrace free markets and free trade" and said China's economy would ¥170 trillion yuan by 2030. In December, he met with the 1+10 Dialogue in Beijing, including heads of the International Momentary Fund, the World Bank Group, the World Trade Organization, the OECD and the International Labour Organization, where he called on them to reject protectionism.

In January 2026, Li visited Guangdong, where he called on officials to take "extraordinary" measures to increase economic growth. In February 2026, he visited Ganzhou, Jiangxi, which included visits to the Ganjiang Innovation Academy of the Chinese Academy of Sciences and critical mineral producers, as well as a meeting with local business leaders and researchers. In March 2026 at the third session of the 14th National People's Congress, Li delivered the annual government work report and called for measures to build a "fertility-friendly society" in order to raise country's birth rate. The same month, he attended the China Development Forum where he promised "to promote the sound and balanced development of trade". In April 2026, Li undertook a three-day trip to Sichuan, calling for a "new-type power system" to accelerate the development of green technology and artificial intelligence. In the same month, he held a State Council meeting, where he alluded to the volatility in global oil and energy prices since the start of the 2026 Iran war, stating "Given upheavals in the international situation and the steady growth of China’s energy demand, we must maintain vigilance and a bottom-line mentality to enhance resilience and secure supplies". In May 2026, he visited Xiaomi’s electric vehicle factory and the Humanoid Robot Innovation Center and called for further use of AI systems in manufacturing. In the same month, he visited Zhoushan and Ningbo in Zhejiang, where he inspected strategic oil reserves and grain stockpiles.

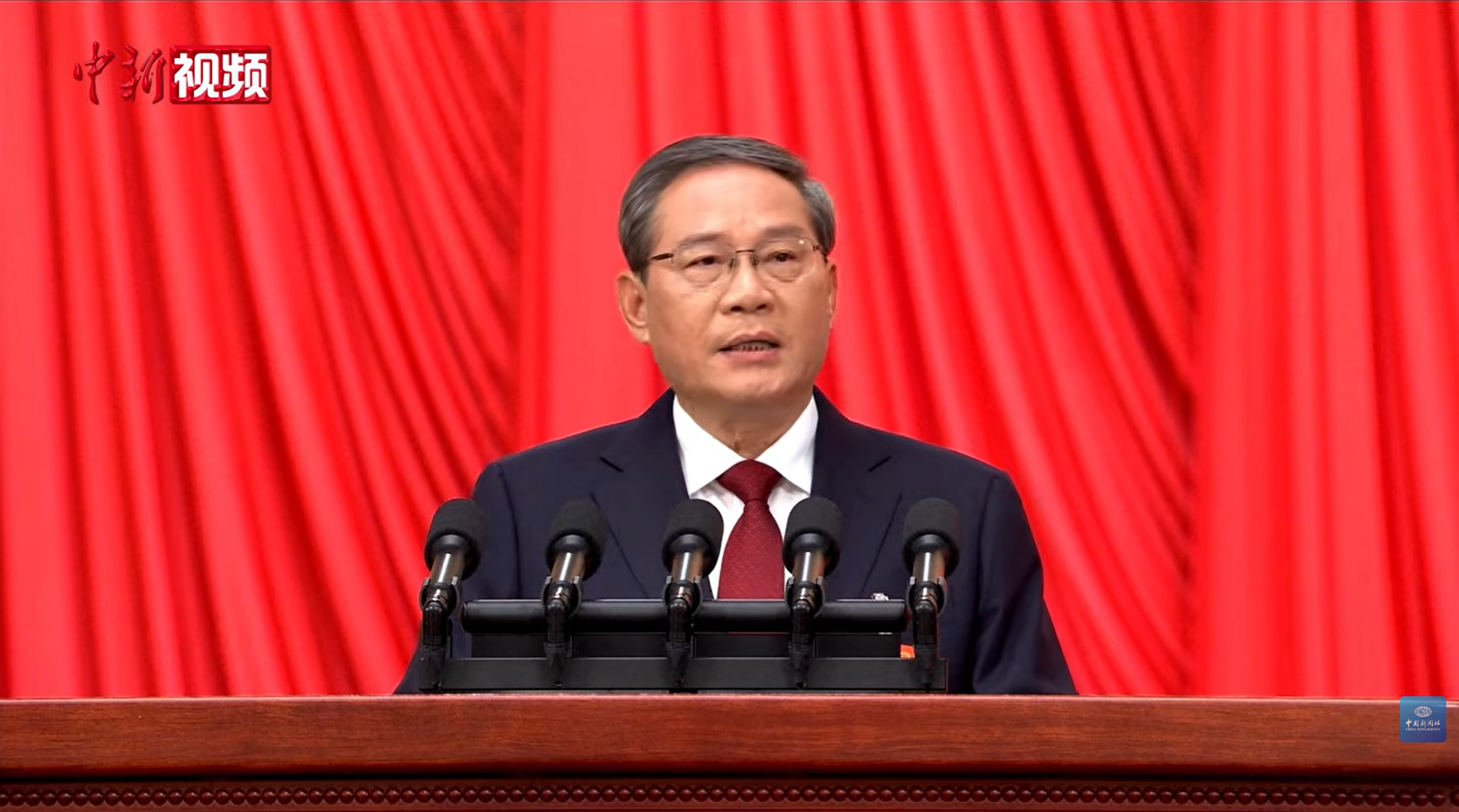
Li delivering the government work report to the National Peoples Congress on March 5, 2026

In June 2026, he visited Dalian, Liaoning, where he inspected shipbuilding and nuclear power companies. He also attended the annual summer meeting of the World Economic Forum in the city, where he said the growth in China's exports cannot be attributed to subsidies. Additionally, he held a State Council meeting on developments on artificial intelligence. He also visited Tangshan to mark the 50th anniversary of the 1976 earthquake in the city, and said he was entrusted by Xi to make the trip. In August 2026, he held a meeting of the State Council, where he called for policies to "anchor efforts to development goals, give full play to the effectiveness of existing policies, and promptly formulate practical and effective incremental policies". In the same month, Li visited Heilongjiang and Jilin, where he inspected farms, research institutes and agricultural companies. He also visited Tibet following floods on the China–Nepal border to inspect the affected regions. In September 2026, he chaired a State Council meeting, where he urged the acceleration of construction of the urban underground pipe network. In the same month, he visited Shanghai, where he gave remarks at an AI application testing base saying "we should combine China’s strengths in manufacturing and digital technologies". He also visited an incubator for future industries and met executives of international charity organization WorldSkills. In September, Li also held a State Council conference, which pledged to increase counter-cyclical adjustments in economic policy to meet the government’s economic goals for 2026. In October, Li attended the opening ceremony for the autumn session of the Canton Fair, where he said China was ready to import more high-quality goods, especially high-value-added products.

=== Diplomacy ===
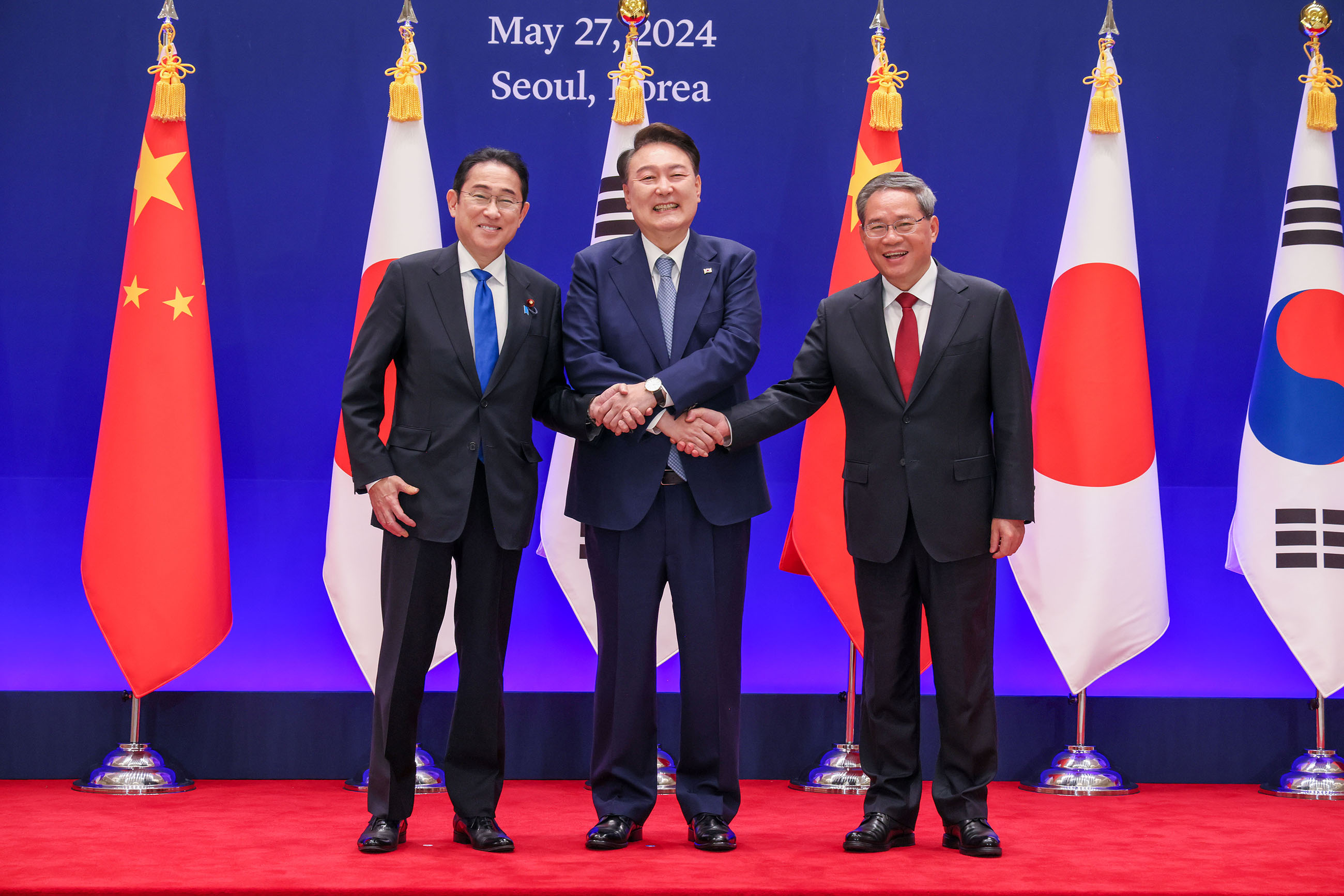
Li with Prime Minister of Japan Fumio Kishida and President of South Korea Yoon Suk-yeol at the 2024 China-Japan-South Korea trilateral summit on 27 May 2024

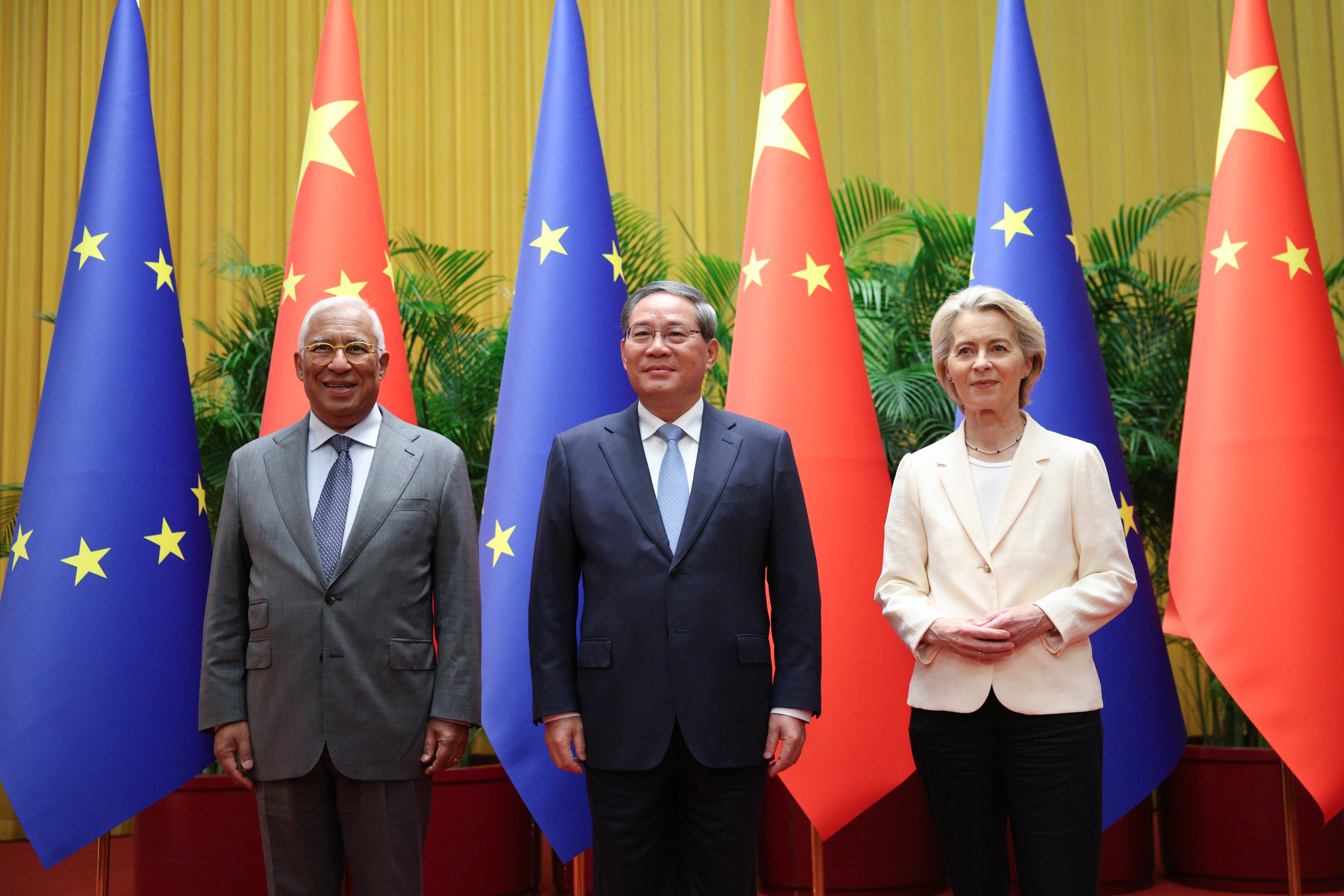
António Costa, Li Qiang, and Ursula von der Leyen at the EU–China Summit in Beijing, July 2025

In April 2023, Li met with Japanese foreign minister Yoshimasa Hayashi in Beijing in order to improve ties. In May, Li met with Russian prime minister Mikhail Mishustin, where he hailed the "comprehensive strategic cooperative partnership between China and Russia in the new era", saying that bilateral trade between China and Russia had increased by 40% over the past year. On 19 June 2023, Li started a trip to Germany, his first trip overseas as premier, where he met with president Frank-Walter Steinmeier, chancellor Olaf Scholz, as well as CEOs of large German companies such as Mercedes-Benz, SAP, and Siemens Energy. After four days in Germany, he travelled to France on 21 June, where he met with French president Emmanuel Macron, prime minister Élisabeth Borne, as well as European Council president Charles Michel. Li addressed the World Economic Forum's 14th Annual Meeting of the New Champions in Tianjin, where he said China's economy remained on track and criticized efforts at "derisking".

Between 5 and 8 September, Li visited Jakarta, Indonesia, where he met with various ASEAN leaders. Li additionally met other leaders such as Australian prime minister Anthony Albanese, Japanese prime minister Fumio Kishida and South Korean president Yoon Suk Yeol during various summits such as the ASEAN Plus Three summit and the East Asia Summit. Li Qiang also met with Indonesian president Joko Widodo, vowing $21.7 billion new Chinese investment in Indonesia. Between 9 and 10 September, Li attended the G20 New Delhi summit as the representative of President Xi Jinping, who did not attend; this marked the first time the Chinese premier attended the G20 summit instead of the president. There, he met various leaders such as Italian prime minister Giorgia Meloni, President of the European Commission Ursula von der Leyen, US president Joe Biden, and British prime minister Rishi Sunak.

In January 2024, Li Qiang visited Switzerland and Ireland, and he attended the annual meeting of World Economic Forum in Davos. In April, Li invited Dutch Prime Minister Mark Rutte and German Chancellor Olaf Scholz to visit China. In May, Li met with Russian President Vladimir Putin in Beijing. Between May 26 and May 27, Li attended the China–Japan–South Korea trilateral summit in Seoul, and met with South Korean President Yoon Suk-yeol and Japanese Prime Minister Fumio Kishida. In mid-June 2024, Li Qiang visited New Zealand, where he was hosted by New Zealand Prime Minister Christopher Luxon and Governor-General Cindy Kiro to sign trade and climate change agreements. China agreed to extend visa-free travel to New Zealanders while New Zealand agreed to support Chinese language training and cultural exchange programmes by local Confucius Institutes.

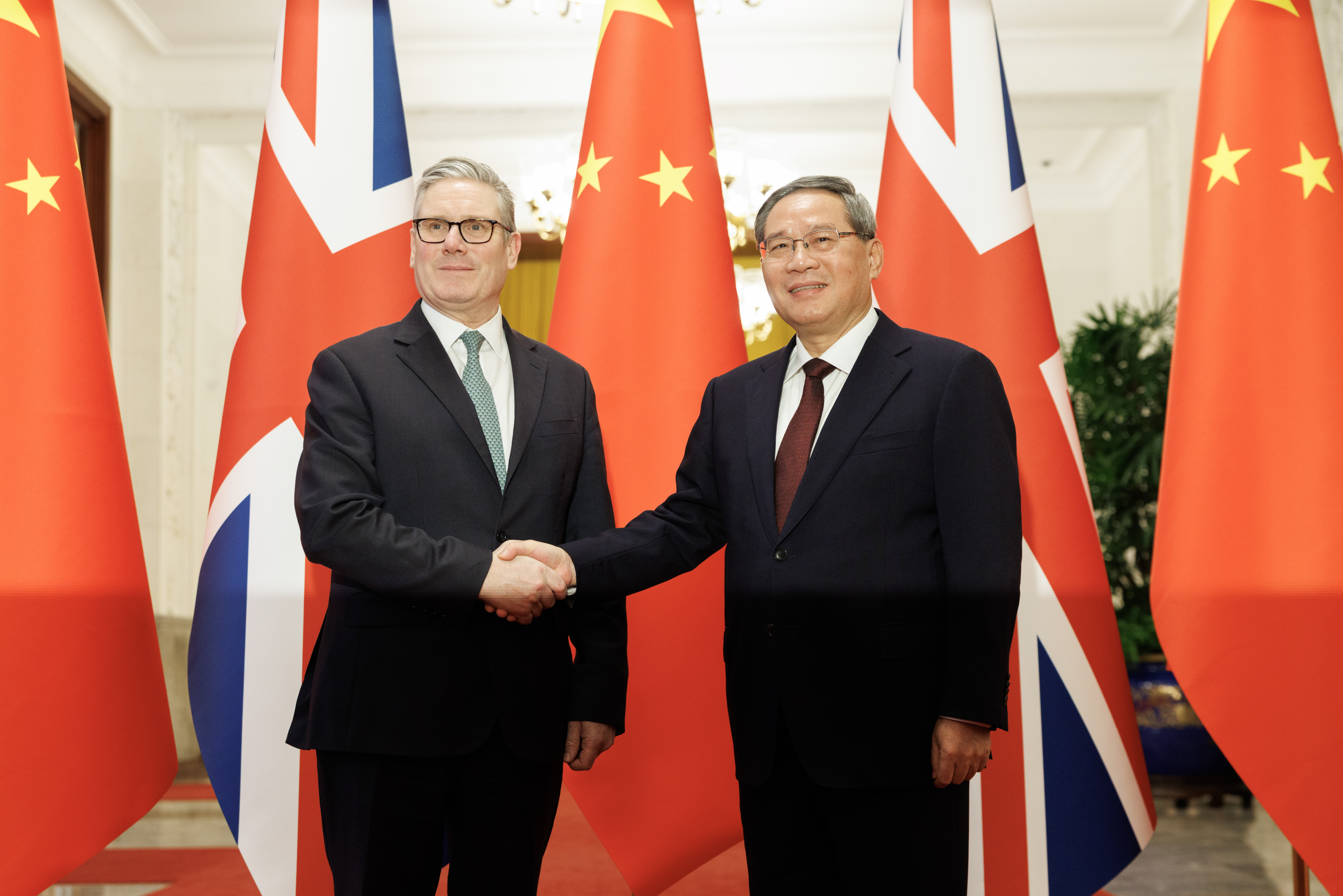
Li with British Prime Minister Keir Starmer in Beijing, 29 January 2026

In March 2025, he met with United States Senator Steve Daines, who is also a close ally of President Donald Trump. In May 2025, he addressed the inaugural summit of the meeting of China, the ASEAN and the Gulf Cooperation Council. He addressed the annual WEF meeting in Tianjin in June 2025, where he said China would "open its doors still wider to the world" and that it would transition to a "mega-consumer market". In September 2025, Li addressed the general debate of the eightieth session of the United Nations General Assembly where he criticized the rise in unilateral and protectionist measures in trade and also warned against the rise of "unilateralism and Cold War mentality." In October 2025, Li visited North Korea to attend the 80th anniversary celebrations of the Workers' Party of Korea, where he also met with North Korean leader Kim Jong Un. In November 2025, Li visited Russia to attend the Shanghai Cooperation Organisation heads of government summit, visited Zambia for an official visit, and attended G20 Johannesburg as the representative of President Xi, marking his second attendance to a G20 summit. At the summit, he called for an "international economic and trade co-operation initiative on green minerals".

In September 2026, he met a delegation from the US-China Business Council led by its chair Visa CEO Ryan McInerney. In the same month, he met with Qatari Prime Minister and Foreign Minister Mohammed bin Abdulrahman bin Jassim Al Thani, where he pledged to deepen cooperation with Qatar. In October 2026, he visited Uzbekistan, Tajikistan and Russia.

== Political views ==
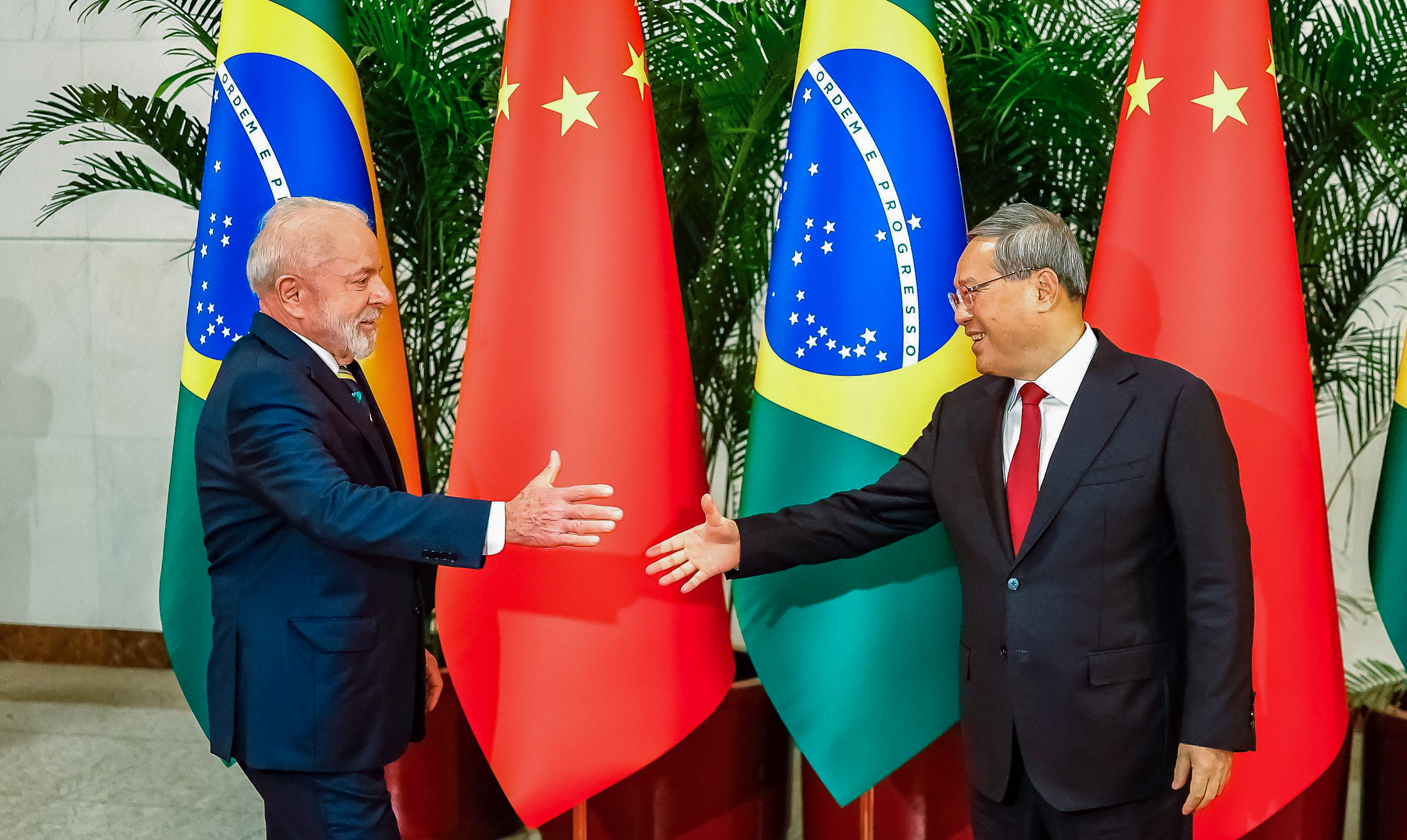
Li with Brazilian President Luiz Inácio Lula da Silva on 13 May 2025

Li is seen as pro-business and supportive of economic reforms, promoting private sector and service sector development. According to The Economist, "[r]educing bureaucratic interference in the market is one of his favorite themes". In 2003, during his tenure in Wenzhou, he said that "without the private economy, Wenzhou's urban development would be set back by at least a century". In 2014, Li said that "there should be more Alibabas and more Jack Mas". In 2015, he stated that economic reforms were a matter of "life and death" and that "the government cannot be an unlimited one." He also said that "to build a limited yet effective modern government a lot of managerial power should be transferred to social organizations." According to The Wall Street Journal, Li has close ties with Jack Ma. The newspaper also reported that Li suggested to the government to ease its regulatory actions against businesses and acted as mediatories between businesses and the government during the government's crackdown on private businesses. Li has also been supportive of innovation related to information technology and artificial intelligence, and has called for more focus for the "real economy".

== Personal life ==
Li's wife Lin Huan is a retired civil servant, who previously worked in the transportation bureau of the Zhejiang provincial government. The couple have one daughter, who studied in Australia.

Unusual in senior Chinese politics, Li has emphasized his local identity, namely his ties to Wenzhou. He set up the World Wenzhounese Conference to encourage members of the global Wenzhounese diaspora to invest back in the city, and told the conference in 2013 that "I was born and bred a Wenzhounese" and "[t]he Wenzhounese spirit of daring to be the first and especially of strong entrepreneurship has always inspired and nourished me".

In 2024, Li Qiang was named one of the 100 most influential people of 2024 by Time. The description stated "While Xi has consolidated more executive power than any other Chinese leader since Mao Zedong, the gritty task of policy implementation now falls to Li—the COO to Xi’s formidable CEO".

== Notes ==
Party political offices
Preceded by Jiang Jufeng	Party Secretary of Wenzhou; 2002–2004	Succeeded by Wang Jianman (王建满)
Preceded by Zhang Xi (张曦)	Secretary-General of the CCP Zhejiang Provincial Committee; 2004–2012	Succeeded by Zhao Yide
Preceded by Wang Huizhong	Secretary of the Political and Legal Affairs Commission of the CCP Zhejiang Provincial Committee; 2011–2012	Succeeded by Wang Huizhong
Preceded by Xia Baolong	Deputy Party Secretary of Zhejiang; 2011–2012	Succeeded by Wang Huizhong
Preceded by Luo Zhijun	Party Secretary of Jiangsu; 2016–2017	Succeeded by Lou Qinjian
Preceded by Han Zheng	Party Secretary of Shanghai; 2017–2022	Succeeded by Chen Jining
Government offices
Preceded by Xia Baolong	Governor of Zhejiang; 2012–2016	Succeeded by Che Jun
Preceded by Li Keqiang	Premier of China; 2023–present	Incumbent
Order of precedence
Preceded by Xi Jinping as General Secretary of the Chinese Communist Party	Order of precedence of China as Premier of China	Succeeded by Zhao Leji as Chairman of the Standing Committee of the National People's Congress
