= Frederick Teiwes =

American born Australian sinologist

Frederick Carl Teiwes (born 1939) is an American-born Australian sinologist. He held a personal chair as professor emeritus in Government and International Relations at Sydney University until his retirement in 2006. He is especially known for his detailed studies, together with Warren Sun, on the history of Chinese Communist Party (CCP) elite politics.

== Biography ==
Teiwes was born in Mt. Vernon, New York on 3 March 1939, and graduated in 1957 from Hastings High School. He graduated from Amherst College in 1961 with a bachelor's degree in European history.

== Career ==
After graduation, Teiwes worked as a journalist at Providence Journal in Westerly, Rhode Island. He then enrolled in graduate school at Columbia University, where he adopted a focus on the politics of China. He worked for a year at Columbia’s Research Institute on Communist Affairs and then lived in Hong Kong, conducting research at the Universities Service Centre for China Studies for his thesis "Rectification campaigns and purges in Communist China, 1950-61". Teiwes received his doctorate in 1971.

Teiwes taught at Cornell University for three years beginning in 1969. In 1972, he accepted a research appointment at the Australian National University in Canberra. In 1976, he accepted a position at Sydney University, where he remained.

At his retirement dinner, David Shambaugh said Teiwes was considered a giant in his field, stating "His published contributions have been seminal and personal presence considerable…I do not think I know of another researcher in our field with higher evidentiary standards. This professional trait has lodged Fred's studies in the prized 'definitive' category."

In 2013 he shifted the focus of his research to the era of Deng Xiaoping.

== Publications ==
- Teiwes, Frederick C. Leadership, Legitimacy, and Conflict in China: From a Charismatic Mao to the Politics of Succession. Armonk, N.Y.: M.E. Sharpe, 1984.
- Teiwes, F, Politics at Mao’s Court (Armonk, New York: M.E. Sharpe, 1990)
- Teiwes, F, Politics and Purges in China (Armonk, New York: M.E. Sharpe, 1993).
- Teiwes, F, Warren Sun The Tragedy of Lin Biao, Riding the Tiger During the Cultural Revolution (Honolulu: University of Hawaii Press, 1996)
- Teiwes, F, Sun, W. China’s Road to Disaster (Armonk, New York: M.E. Sharpe, 1999)
- Teiwes, F., Sun, W. The End of the Maoist Era: Chinese Politics during the Twilight of the Cultural Revolution, 1972-1976. (Armonk, New York: M.E. Sharpe, 2007).
