= Collective study session =

Chinese Communist Party gathering

Collective Study Session of the Politburo of the Chinese Communist Party
- Simplified Chinese: 中共中央政治局集体学习
- Traditional Chinese: 中共中央政治局集體學習
Transcriptions
Standard Mandarin
- Hanyu Pinyin: Zhōnggòng Zhōngyāng Zhèngzhìjú Jítǐ Xuéxí

A collective study session (Chinese: 集体学习; pinyin: Jítǐ Xuéxí) is a periodic gathering of the Politburo of the Chinese Communist Party (CCP).

== History ==
Collective study sessions in their current form began under CCP General Secretary Hu Jintao in December 2002. Between December 2002 and July 2021, the Politburo has convened a total of 151 collective study sessions; 77 under the leadership of Hu and 74 under the leadership of Xi Jinping.

== Description ==
The collective study sessions serve as an opportunity for CCP leadership to promote new policies. They generally take place shortly after the standard meetings, usually on the same day or the day after. The Politburo invites professors, think tank scholars or other experts to give a lecture to the Politburo members about a topic chosen by the General Secretary. Though how the topics are chosen is unknown, the General Secretary is thought to have the final say, with the Central Policy Research Office (CPRO) playing a leading role and with consultation with the CCP General Office. According to the China Social Science Net, the topics are either recommended by Politburo members relevant to the policy areas under their purview, or submitted by personnel within the General Office, leading small groups, CCP commissions and other policy institutions. Topics range from history, ideology, philosophy, economics, security, foreign policy, environmental policy, social policy and Party policy.

Once the topic is decided, the General Office invites relevant departments to help the CPRO decide on speakers, with the approval of the General Office. The General Office then coordinates the content and preparations for the session. The preparation for the meeting is extensive, with consultations with the General Office and the CPRO, drafting of the lecture and its review, trial lectures and vetting. The sessions are held in a conference room within the Huairen Hall. The meetings last for around two hours, with the first eighty minutes allocated to a lecture by one or more speakers, followed by thirty minutes of discussion with Politburo members where attendees ask questions and discuss the topic after the lecture, and ending with ten minutes of concluding remarks by the General Secretary. These lectures often end with "work recommendations" for the Politburo and conclude with a speech by the General Secretary on the study topic. The collective study sessions are often publicized and play an important role to signal leadership priorities to cadres.

== See also ==
- Special study session
