= Joseph Fewsmith (political scientist) =

American political scientist (1949–2025)

Joseph Fewsmith (Chinese: 傅士卓; 9 May 1949 – 4 November 2025) was an American political scientist. He was professor emeritus of International Relations and Political Science at Boston University.

== Life ==
Joseph Fewsmith was born in Shaker Heights, Ohio in 1949. He obtained his bachelor's degree at Northwestern University and his PhD degree in political science at the University of Chicago, where he studied with Tsou Tang and Philippe Schmitter. He worked as an analyst in Washington D.C. for several years before joining Boston University as a faculty member in 1991, where he taught until his retirement in May 2025.

In his career as a political scientist, Fewsmith researched extensively on Chinese politics, especially on questions concerning elite politics, intellectual history, cadre system, civic society, local governments, and economic reforms in China.

Fewsmith died on 4 November 2025.

== Books ==
- Party, State, and Local Elites in Republican China: Merchant Organizations and Politics in Shanghai, 1890-1930 (University of Hawaii Press, 1985)
- The Dilemmas of Reform in China: Political Conflict and Economic Debate (M.E. Sharpe, 1994)
- China Since Tiananmen: The Politics of Transition (Cambridge University Press, 2001)
- Elite Politics in Contemporary China (M.E. Sharpe, 2001)
- China Since Tiananmen: From Deng Xiaoping to Hu Jintao, Second Edition (Cambridge University Press, 2008)
- China's Opening Society: The Non-State Sector and Governance, co-edited with Zheng Yongnian (Routledge, 2008)
- China Today, China Tomorrow: Domestic Politics, Economy, and Society, ed. (Rowman & Littlefield, 2010)
- The Logic and Limits of Political Reform in China (Cambridge University Press, 2013)
- Rethinking Chinese Politics (Cambridge University Press, 2021)
- Forging Leninism in China: Mao and the Remaking of the Chinese Communist Party, 1927-1934 (Cambridge University Press, 2022)
