= Office of the President of China =

Office of the President of the People's Republic of China
- 中华人民共和国主席办公室
- National emblem of China

Agency overview
- Formed: 1993; 33 years ago
- Status: Deputy-ministerial level agency
- Headquarters: Zhongnanhai, Beijing, China
- Agency executives: Han Shiming, Director; Lü Luhua, Secretary to the President

The Office of the President of the People's Republic of China (Chinese: 中华人民共和国主席办公室) is a bureau whose staff is assigned to work directly under, and closely with the president of China.

== History ==
In 1954, the Chairman of the People's Republic of China established a daily office - the General Office of the Chairman of the People's Republic of China. On July 30, 1955, Chairman Mao Zedong appointed Zhang Jingwu as Director of the General Office. Zhang became the only Director of the General Office of the chairman in history. He also served as the Representative of the Central People's Government in Tibet and the First Secretary of the Chinese Communist Party's Tibet Working Committee.

In 1959, after Liu Shaoqi succeeded Mao Zedong as the Chairman of the PRC, Zhang continued to serve as the Director of the General Office. After the outbreak of the Cultural Revolution, Chairman Liu quickly lost power, and the General Office of the chairman ceased to operate. Zhang Jingwu was subsequently imprisoned in Qincheng Prison and was persecuted to death in 1971. In 1975, the National People's Congress passed a new constitution, abolished the post of chairman and its office. The 1982 Constitution of the People's Republic of China restored the position of President, but did not grant it any real power. When Li Xiannian and Yang Shangkun served as Chinese Presidents, they did not set up a formal office, only an informal office and secretary.

After Jiang Zemin assumed the office of President in 1993, he established the Office of the President of the People's Republic of China. Jia Ting'an, Director of the Office of the CCP General Secretary, concurrently served as the Director of the Office, and was referred to as "Director of the Office of President Jiang Zemin" to the outside world. This title often appeared in official reports of the official media. During Hu Jintao 's tenure as president, Chen Shiju was designated as the Director of the Office of the President.

== Directors ==
Director of the General Office of the Chairman of the People's Republic of China

1. Zhang Jingwu (July 1955–July 1960)

Director of the Office of the President of the People's Republic of China

1. Jia Ting'an (1993–2003)
2. Chen Shiju (2003–2013)
3. Ding Xuexiang (2013–2022)
4. Han Shiming (June 2024–)

== See also ==
- Abolition of the presidency in China
- Office of the General Secretary of the Chinese Communist Party
- Office of the Premier of China
- Office of the Chairman of the Central Military Commission
