= Office of the General Secretary of the Chinese Communist Party =

Office of the General Secretary of the Central Committee of the Chinese Communist Party
- 中国共产党中央委员会总书记办公室
- Emblem of the Chinese Communist Party

Agency overview
- Formed: June 1989; 37 years ago
- Status: Institution directly under the General Office of the Central Committee; Deputy-ministerial level agency
- Headquarters: Qinzheng Hall, Zhongnanhai, Beijing, China
- Parent department: Central Committee General Office

The Office of the General Secretary of the Central Committee of the Chinese Communist Party often referred to as the General Secretary's Office (Chinese: 总书记办公室; pinyin: Zǒngshūjì Bàngōngshì) is a bureau whose staff is assigned to work directly under, and closely with the Chinese Communist Party (CCP)'s General Secretary. The Office manages personal affairs of the General Secretary and is a part of the Central Committee, but reports directly to the General Secretary. The director of the Office of the General Secretary and the staff under him are considered to be Mishus, or trusted confidants responsible for maintaining the private information and correspondence of the party's leader.

The office is distinct from, and administratively subordinate to, the CCP General Office, whose staff support the many party departments under the CCP Central Committee, the CCP Secretariat and the CCP Politburo. All directors of the Office of the General Secretary have also concurrently served as directors of the Office of the President.

== History ==
The earlier position of Chairman of the Chinese Communist Party did not have formal staff responsible for supporting only their work specifically. After the office of Chairman of the CCP Central Committee was replaced by the general secretary of the CCP Central Committee in 1982, the two general secretaries Hu Yaobang and Zhao Ziyang respectively employed Lin Mu and Bao Tong as their main secretaries. In spite of this arrangement, the office of the general secretary of the Central Committee of the Chinese Communist Party was not yet formally established. It was not until Jiang Zemin became the general secretary that the official institution of the General Secretary's Office of the Central Committee of the Chinese Communist Party was clearly established. Under the Hu Jintao Administration, the position was considered to be of Ministerial Rank, though under the Xi Jinping Administration, the position is now Departmental Rank, which is one level lower.

== Directors of the Office of the General Secretary ==
1. Lin Mu (1982–1987) (de facto)
2. Bao Tong (1987–June 1989) (de facto)
3. Jia Tingan (June 1989–2002)
4. Chen Shiju (2002–2013)
5. Ding Xuexiang (2013–2023)

== See also ==
- Office of the President of China
- Office of the Premier of China
- Office of the Chairman of the Central Military Commission
