= Wang Ruilin =

Chinese general (1930–2018)

- 王瑞林

Secretary of the Commission for Discipline Inspection of the Central Military Commission
- In office April 1990 – July 1993
- Preceded by: Guo Linxiang
- Succeeded by: Zhou Ziyu

Personal details
- Born: January 16, 1930 Zhaoyuan, Shandong, China
- Died: December 8, 2018 (aged 88) Beijing, China
- Party: Chinese Communist Party

Military service
- Allegiance: People's Republic of China
- Branch/service: People's Liberation Army Ground Force
- Years of service: 1946–2003
- Rank: General (Shangjiang)
- Battles/wars: Chinese Civil War

Wang Ruilin (Chinese: 王瑞林; pinyin: Wáng Ruìlín; Wade–Giles: Wang Jui-lin; 16 January 1930 – 8 December 2018) was a general of the Chinese People's Liberation Army (PLA). He was a long-term secretary of Deng Xiaoping and served as a member of the Central Military Commission.

== Career ==
Born in Zhaoyuan, Shandong, Wang joined PLA in 1946, and joined the Chinese Communist Party (CCP) in February 1947. He had served as secretary of Deng Xiaoping since 1952, when Deng was the vice premier of the State Council. When Deng re-emerged in the 1970s, Wang became his secretary again and held this post till Deng's retirement in 1990.

From 1990 to 1995, he was the vice director of General Office of the Chinese Communist Party, secretary of discipline commission of CMC and the vice director of PLA General Political Department, Deputy secretary of the party committee. In 1995, he became a member of the CMC. He attained the rank of lieutenant general in September 1988 and full general in June 1994.

Wang accompanied Deng on Deng's 1992 southern tour.

Wang was a member of 13th, 14th and 15th Central Committees of the Chinese Communist Party.

Wang died on 8 December 2018 in Beijing, at the age of 88.

Military offices
New title	Director of the Office of the Chairman of the Central Military Commission; 1981–1989	Succeeded by Jia Ting'an
Preceded by Guo Linxiang	Secretary of the Commission for Discipline Inspection of the Central Military Commission; 1990–1993	Succeeded by Zhou Ziyu
