= Office of the Premier of China =

Office of the Premier of the State Council of the People's Republic of China
- 中华人民共和国国务院总理办公室
- National emblem of China

Agency overview
- Formed: April 1988; 38 years ago
- Status: Department-level agency
- Headquarters: Premier's Office, Zhongnanhai, Beijing, China
- Agency executive: Kang Xuping, Director

The Office of the Premier of the State Council of the People's Republic of China is a bureau whose staff is assigned to work directly under, and closely with the premier of the State Council.

== History ==
In the early 1950s, the Government Affairs Commission of the Central People's Government (renamed the State Council of China in 1954) had a Premier's Office, which had a maximum of 17 secretaries. At the end of 1957, the first major streamlining was carried out, leaving only 9 secretaries, including the director and deputy director, who took office in April 1958. After streamlining, only six or seven people were left by 1957 and 1958. Secretaries were generally divided into foreign affairs, culture and education, politics and law, economy, and military affairs. In 1965, in order to carry out the "institutional revolution", the Premier's Office was removed from the State Council (the third session of the 1st National People's Congress, which closed on January 4, 1965, passed a relevant resolution) and replaced with a Premier's Duty Room in the West Flower Hall of Zhongnanhai (where Premier Zhou Enlai lived), with only two or three secretaries.

After Li Peng became Premier of the State Council in April 1988, the Premier's Office was officially restored.

== Directors of the Office of the Premier ==
1. Zhang Weiyi (September 1950–September 1954)
2. Qi Yanming (November 1954–April 1958, Deputy Secretary-General of the State Council)
3. Tong Xiaopeng (April 1958–1965)
4. Jiang Yunbao (December 1991–March 1998)
5. Li Wei (March 1998–March 2003)
6. Qiu Xiaoxiong (April 2003–May 2011)
7. Xiang Zhaolun (May 2011–January 2013)
8. Shi Gang (July 2013–?)
9. Kang Xuping (2023–)

== See also ==
- Office of the General Secretary of the Chinese Communist Party
- Office of the President of China
- Office of the Chairman of the Central Military Commission
