= Office of the Chairman of the Central Military Commission =

- 中央军委主席办公室
- Emblem of the People's Liberation Army

Agency overview
- Formed: April 1988; 38 years ago
- Headquarters: No 7 Fuxing Road, Haidian, Beijing, China
- Agency executive: Fang Yongxiang, Director
- Parent department: General Office of the Central Military Commission

The Office of the Chairman of the Central Military Commission is a bureau whose staff is assigned to work directly under, and closely with the chairman of the Central Military Commission.

== History ==
In 2000, Jiang Zemin, the Chairman of the Central Military Commission, opened the Office of the Chairman of the Central Military Commission in the August 1st Building of the Central Military Commission. The Office of the Chairman of the Central Military Commission is a spacious suite that occupies most of one floor of the August 1st and is equipped with the latest telecommunications equipment.

== Directors of the Office of the Central Military Commission ==
1. Lieutenant General Wang Ruilin (1981–1989)
2. Major General Jia Ting'an (1994–September 2004)
3. Lieutenant General Wu Zhiming (September 2004–June 2013)
4. Colonel → Major General → Lieutenant General Zhong Shaojun (June 2013 – March 2024)
5. Lieutenant General Fang Yongxiang (March 2024 - present)

== See also ==
- Office of the General Secretary of the Chinese Communist Party
- Office of the President of China
- Office of the Premier of China
