= Auditorium of the State Council =

Government building in Beijing

The Auditorium of the State Council (国务院小礼堂) is located in the North District of Zhongnanhai, Xicheng, Beijing, and is affiliated to the General Office of the State Council.

== History ==
The State Council Auditorium is located to the west of the Ziguang Pavilion in Zhongnanhai. It was originally converted from a staff canteen. In the mid-1950s, because the State Council Auditorium could only accommodate four or five hundred people for meetings and could not be used in conjunction with the Ziguang Pavilion, the relevant departments of the State Council prepared to build a new auditorium. The construction team had just dismantled a corner of the roof of the State Council Auditorium. Premier Zhou Enlai saw it and asked the head of the guard Cheng Yuangong why he wanted to dismantle the auditorium. Cheng Yuangong told Zhou Enlai: "We need to build a new auditorium." Zhou Enlai said, "The original one can still be used, why build a new one? It can't be repaired." He immediately notified the relevant departments of the State Council. Subsequently, the demolished corner of the State Council Auditorium was repaired, the original low stage was slightly raised, and the rest of the parts remained the same. Later, the relevant departments proposed to rebuild the State Council Auditorium several times, but Zhou Enlai disagreed and said: "The State Council organs should take the lead in implementing the central government's instructions on practicing strict economy."

From December 1963 to February 29, 1964, Zhou Enlai left Beijing and visited 14 countries in Asia and Africa. While Zhou Enlai was away, the relevant departments of the State Council decided to demolish the State Council Auditorium and build a new one. The doors, windows and other building components that were demolished were handed over to the State Council Farm. After Zhou Enlai returned to China, he entered the north gate of Zhongnanhai and saw that the State Council Auditorium had been demolished. He asked Cheng Yuangong to call the relevant departments to find out the situation. After learning that a new auditorium was to be built, he immediately asked Cheng Yuangong to tell the relevant departments: "You cannot build a new auditorium, you cannot change the original structure, you must restore it to its original state." Because the doors, windows, glass and other building components were gone, they had to be redone. All the staff of the service department participated in the work of making their own frosted glass, working for five or six days. In the end, a hall that was similar to the old one was built.

In 1979, the State Council's small auditorium was renovated and a new auditorium was built, which is still in use today.

According to an article written by Zhao Qingyun, who served as Director of the Administrative Department of the General Office of the State Council from 1984 to 1990, the carpets used in the First Conference Room and the Small Auditorium, where the State Council held State Council meetings, were all synthetic carpets that had been used for many years. The long sofa in the lounge of the Small Auditorium was a product from the 1970s. When meetings were held in the Small Auditorium, three pencils were prepared for each participant. After the meetings, these used pencils would be used again by the Administrative Department of the General Office of the State Council and various other departments.

The State Council Auditorium screens one or two films every week. This has been a practice since the early days of the People's Republic of China. At that time, under the arrangement of Zhou Enlai, imported films were first screened for central leaders in the lobby of the West Building of Zhongnanhai and the State Council Auditorium, and then gradually turned to internal staff of the agency, and finally released to the public. When the State Council Auditorium screened a film, except for the staff serving the film evening, all other leaders of the State Council, ministries, and general staff of the agency had to go to the ticket office in the lobby to buy tickets. The rule of buying tickets for admission was set by Zhou Enlai during his lifetime and has been implemented to this day.

In 2012, the State Council General Office's departmental budget included new expenditures for the maintenance and renovation of the State Council's small auditorium, and the fiscal appropriation budget increased accordingly.

After the establishment of the constitutional oath system of the People's Republic of China, the State Council held its first constitutional oath ceremony in the small auditorium of the State Council on the morning of September 18, 2016.

== State Council Meeting Room ==
In addition to the State Council Auditorium, the General Office of the State Council also has several conference rooms:

- The First Conference Room of the State Council: Located in Zhongnanhai. On October 21, 1949, the day when the State Council of the Central People's Government of the People's Republic of China was established, Premier Zhou Enlai presided over the first State Council meeting in this conference room. Since then, this conference room has become the venue for all State Council meetings. After the establishment of the State Council of the People's Republic of China in 1954, this conference room has become the venue for all State Council executive meetings.
- The Second Conference Room of the State Council: Located in Zhongnanhai.
- The Third Conference Room of the State Council: Located in Zhongnanhai.
- The Fourth Conference Room of the State Council Conference: Located in Zhongnanhai.
- The Fifth Conference Room of the State Council: Located in Zhongnanhai.
- The Sixth Conference Room of the State Council: Located in Zhongnanhai.
- The Eight Conference Room of the State Council
