= Jia Ting'an =

- 贾廷安
- Born: September 3, 1952 (age 74); Ye County, Henan, China
- Military career
- Allegiance: People's Liberation Army
- Service years: 1994−2017
- Rank: General
- Commands: Deputy director, Political Work Department

Jia Ting'an (Chinese: 贾廷安; pinyin: Jiǎ Tíng'ān; born September 3, 1952) is a retired general in the Chinese People's Liberation Army. He served as the deputy director of the Political Work Department. He was a principal aide to Jiang Zemin, former General Secretary of the Chinese Communist Party (paramount leader).

== Career ==
Jia was born in Ye County, Henan province. He graduated in 1973 from the Chengdu Telecommunications Engineering College (成都电讯工程学院), where he studied microwaves. In 1982 he joined the staff of Jiang Zemin, who was serving as Minister of Electrical Industry at the time. Later Jiang became Mayor of Shanghai, then Party Secretary. In 1989 after the Tiananmen Square protests, Jiang was promoted to General Secretary of the Chinese Communist Party and Jia joined him on his staff, serving in the Office of the General Secretary and Office of the Central Military Commission Chairman. In 1994 he became deputy head of the General Office serving the Central Military Commission (CMC). He was promoted to major general in the same year. In 2003, he became head of the General Office of the CMC. In 2005, he was promoted to the rank of lieutenant general. In December 2007 Jia was named deputy director of the Political Work Department . In June 2011, he was promoted to general, the highest non-wartime rank in the PLA.

On January 14, 2015, Mingjing News reported that Jia may have been taken in for investigation in a corruption case, but this could not be independently verified nor were there official announcements made.

Duowei News reported that Jia, who had no military background, rose so high in the ranks of the People's Liberation Army solely due to his patronage relationship with Jiang Zemin. An opinion piece on the website said that Jia is a 'loyal foot soldier' of Jiang who was not promoted by merit. The Chinese journal Yanhuang Chunqiu implied that Jia might be linked to the disgraced vice admiral Wang Shouye, who was sentenced to life in prison during the term of Hu Jintao for corruption.

Jia was an alternate of the 17th Central Committee of the Chinese Communist Party (he was ranked last, because out of the elected members he received the lowest number of confirmation votes), and a full member of the 18th Central Committee.

== See also ==
- Shanghai clique

Military offices
Preceded by -	Deputy director of the People's Liberation Army General Political Department; December 2007－	Incumbent
Preceded by Tan Yuexin	Director of the General Office of the Central Military Commission; December 2003－January 2008	Succeeded by Wang Guanzhong
Party political offices
Preceded by Bao Tong; Zhao Ziyang's office	Director of the Office of the General Secretary of the Chinese Communist Party (Jiang Zemin's office); June 1989－May 2002	Succeeded by Chen Shiju; Hu Jintao's office
Preceded by Wang Ruilin; Deng Xiaoping's office	Director of the Office of the Chairman of the Central Military Commission (Jiang Zemin's office); November 1989－September 2004	Succeeded by Chen Shiju; Hu Jintao's office
