= World Data Organization =

Body founded by the Chinese government

- 世界数据组织
- Logo of the organization
- Abbreviation: WDO
- Established: 30 March 2026
- Headquarters: Beijing, China
- President: Tan Tieniu
- Secretary-General: Yang Jie
- Website: thewdo.org

The World Data Organization (WDO) is an organization that focused on data established 2026 by the Chinese government. It is headquartered in Beijing.

== History ==
The World Data Organization was founded on 30 March 2026. At its founding, the WDO claimed to have more than 200 members from more than 40 countries at its launch, including companies, universities, think tanks, international organizations, financial institutions across industries. The People's Daily reported the Xi Jinping, the general secretary of the Chinese Communist Party, had penned a congratulatory letter, which was read by Vice Premier Ding Xuexiang at the founding ceremony. Muhammadou M. O. Kah, the vice chair of the United Nations Data Governance Working Group, also gave a speech at the founding conference.

== Leadership ==
The president of the WDO is Tan Tieniu. Its vice president and secretary-general is Yang Jie.
