= Lü Luhua =

Chinese diplomat

- 吕录华

Secretary to the President of China
- Incumbent
- Assumed office 2014
- President: Xi Jinping

Personal details
- Party: Chinese Communist Party
- Education: Peking University

Lü Luhua (Chinese: 吕录华; pinyin: Lǚ Lùhuá) is a Chinese diplomat who is currently secretary to the President of China. He works at the Office of the President of China.

== Biography ==
Lü earned a postgraduate degree in history from Peking University.

Lü joined the Ministry of Foreign Affairs in 1996. In the MFA, he worked mostly at the Policy Research Department and the Policy Planning Department. Additionally, he was posted in Kenya and the European Union in the years before 2012, where it is likely he is considered to have worked with Hua Chunying and Wang Yajun.

Lü has served as Xi Jinping's top personal political secretary asssiting in day-to-day work related to foreign affairs since at least 2014. He works at the Office of the President of China and is thought to have deputy-ministerial rank. In his capacity, Lü has frequently accompanied Xi Jinping in his international visits abroad.
