= Ding Xuexiang =

First-ranking Vice Premier of China since 2023

- 丁薛祥
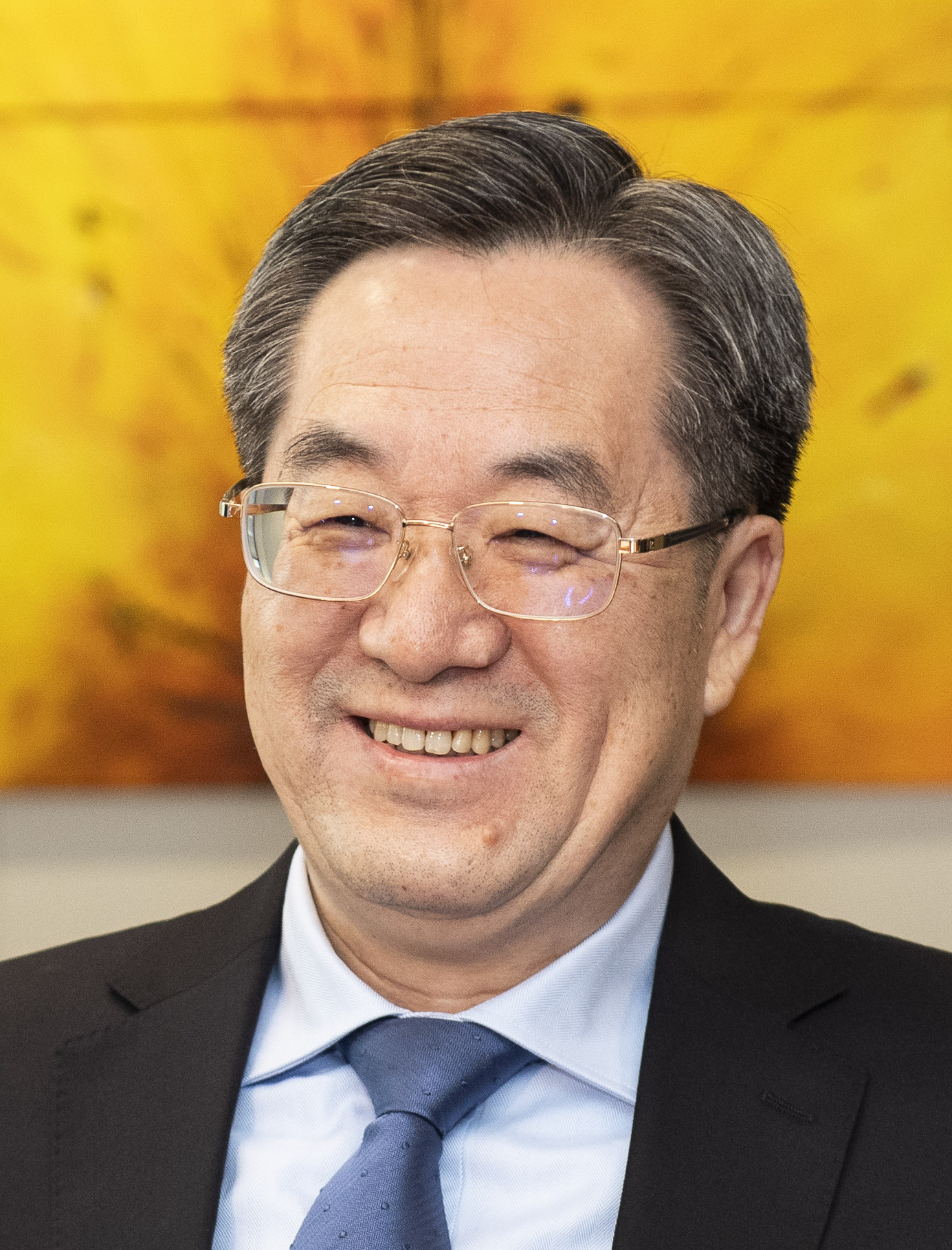
- Ding in 2024

Vice Premier of China
- Incumbent
- Assumed office 12 March 2023
- Premier: Li Qiang

Director of the Central Science and Technology Commission
- Incumbent
- Assumed office 12 March 2023
- General Secretary: Xi Jinping

Director of the General Office of the Chinese Communist Party
- In office 15 November 2017 – March 2023
- Deputy: Meng Xiangfeng (executive)
- General Secretary: Xi Jinping
- Preceded by: Li Zhanshu
- Succeeded by: Cai Qi

Director of the Office of the General Secretary of the Chinese Communist Party
- In office May 2013 – March 2023
- General Secretary: Xi Jinping
- Preceded by: Chen Shiju
- Succeeded by: Unknown

Personal details
- Born: 13 September 1961 (age 65) Nantong, Jiangsu, China
- Party: Chinese Communist Party
- Children: 1 son
- Education: Yanshan University; Fudan University (MS)
- Cabinet: Li Qiang Government

Ding Xuexiang (Note: Chinese: 丁薛祥; pinyin: Dīng Xuēxiáng) (born 13 September 1961) is a Chinese politician who is currently the first-ranked vice premier of China and the sixth-ranked member of the Politburo Standing Committee of the Chinese Communist Party.

Considered a close confidant of CCP general secretary Xi Jinping, Ding served on Xi's staff during his tenure in Shanghai, then followed him to Beijing. He served as the director of the CCP General Secretary's Office between 2013 and 2023 and the director of the CCP General Office between 2017 and 2023. He was also a member of the 19th Party Politburo, and a Secretary of the Party Secretariat between 2017 and 2022.

== Early life and education ==
Ding Xuexiang was born in Nantong, Jiangsu province, on 13 September 1961. In 1977, at the age of 16, Ding enrolled as an undergraduate at the Northeast Heavy Machinery Institute in Qinhuangdao (later Yanshan University), graduating with an engineering degree in 1982.

Ding got his first job at the Shanghai Research Institute of Materials (SRIM) in 1982, where he first served as a research fellow. He joined the Chinese Communist Party (CCP) in 1984, and also became the Communist Youth League secretary at the SRIM that year. In 1988, he became the director of the institute's General Office and Propaganda Department, later becoming the director of the No. 9 Department in 1992. He enrolled in the Fudan University School of Management in 1989, gaining a master's degree in science and management via part-time studies in 1994. In 1994, he became a deputy director of the institute, then its director and Party secretary in 1996, serving in those positions until 1999.

== Political career ==
Ding moved into politics after obtaining his first cadre position, as the deputy director of the Shanghai Municipal Science and Technology Commission, in 1999. He became the head of Zhabei District of Shanghai in 2001. In 2004, he was appointed as the deputy director of the Organization Department of the Shanghai Municipal Party Committee and the director of the Personnel Bureau of the Shanghai Municipal People's Government. In 2006, he became the deputy secretary-general as well as the director of the General Office of the Shanghai Municipal Party Committee.

In 2007, after winning Shanghai Party Secretary Xi Jinping's confidence, Ding was promoted to become the secretary-general, and a member of the Municipal Standing Committee. Ding also won the confidence and support of Yu Zhengsheng, who succeeded Xi as Shanghai Party Secretary. In 2012, he became the secretary of the Political and Legal Committee of the Municipal Party Committee. Ding was elected to the Central Committee as an alternate member at the 18th Party Congress in November 2012.

Ding became the director of the CCP General Secretary's office in May 2013. He also became a deputy director of the CCP General Office. In 2016, Ding became the executive deputy director of the CCP General Office. Ding joined the Politburo and the Secretariat of the CCP in October 2017. In November 2017, he became the director of the CCP General Office while retaining the post of CCP General Secretary's office director (chief of staff).

== Vice Premiership ==
Following the first plenary session of the 20th CCP Central Committee in October 2022, Ding was elected as a member of the CCP Politburo Standing Committee, the top decision-making body in China. Upon his nomination, Voice of America described Ding as "loyal and strong in coordination, but lacking experience in macroeconomic management and other people's livelihood affairs". Ding succeeded Han Zheng as the first-ranked vice premier of China and leader of the Central Leading Group on Hong Kong and Macau Affairs in March 2023. His portfolio as vice premier includes development and reform, public finance, taxation, the environment, education, science and technology, intellectual property, the Chinese Academy of Sciences, and the Chinese Academy of Engineering. In 2023, the Communist Part of China established the Central Science and Technology Commission (CSTC), chaired by Ding, as a science, technology, and innovation policy body.

In March 2023, Ding attended the China Development Forum. In May 2023, he attended the opening ceremony of the Zhongguancun Forum in Beijing, where he called for China to speed up technological innovation. In October 2023, Ding visited Shenzhen, where he paid a trip to DJI, local laboratories and Hetao, a tech cooperation zone with Hong Kong. In June 2024, he was revealed to be the leader of the Central Science and Technology Commission. In March 2026, he attended the founding ceremony of the World Data Organization, where he read a letter sent by Xi Jinping. In April 2026, he attended a digital summit in Fuzhou, where he said independent innovation was the "only way for China’s artificial intelligence industry to withstand external pressure and containment". In August 2026, he inspected Anhui, where he attended a symposium on "pilot scientific fiscal management" programmes.

=== Foreign affairs ===
In May 2023, he attended the eight annual meeting of the New Development Bank. In July 2023, China and the European Union held the 4th EU-China High Level Environment and Climate Dialogue. The European delegation to China was led by Frans Timmermans, while China was represented by Ding. Both sides declared they will continue to cooperate in combating climate change, biodiversity loss and pollution. Both sides agreed to ensure the success of COP28, implement the Kunming-Montreal Global Biodiversity Framework, advance the High Seas Treaty, cooperate in water policy, and reach a global agreement on plastic pollution by 2024. Both sides also agreed to support a circular economy. In November 2023, Ding attended COP28 in Dubai.

In November 2024, he visited Singapore and met with Singaporean Prime Minister Lawrence Wong. He also attended the 20th Joint Council for Bilateral Cooperation, where he met with Deputy Prime Minister Gan Kim Yong. In January 2025, he attended the annual World Economic Forum summit, where he gave a speech saying China does not "seek trade surplus". In November 2025, Ding visited Uruguay and also attended COP30 in Belém, Brazil. In April 2026, he visited Turkmenistan and met with Turkmen President Serdar Berdimuhamedov. In September 2026, he visited Vladivostok to attend the Eastern Economic Forum, where he met with Russian President Vladimir Putin.

=== Hong Kong ===
In September 2023, Ding delivered a pre-recorded video message to the opening ceremony of a two-day forum on the Belt and Road Initiative in Hong Kong. In November 2023, Ding met about 150 youth representatives from Hong Kong and Macao for the first time in Beijing. He pledged to support youth development in Hong Kong with more "concrete work", including on study and job opportunities, starting up businesses and housing issues, addressing young people as the "new blood" for the nation's development.

In March 2024, Ding met with Hong Kong deputies at the National People's Congress, where he called for swiftly enacting the Article 23 legislation. In March 2025, Ding addressed the Hong Kong deputies at the NPC, praising Hong Kong for economic advancements in 2024 while also calling for an emphasis on security. In March 2026, Ding met with the Hong Kong and Macau members of the NPC and the Chinese People's Political Consultative Conference, where he called on the Hong Kong Legislative Council to "contribute under the executive-led system", while expressing optimism for Legislative Council president Starry Lee.

== Personal life ==
Ding's wife previously worked in the education sector. The couple have a son, who works in the China Development Bank. According to the South China Morning Post, Ding possesses "perfect writing skills" and a "famously strong memory", and is known for "quickly turning his bosses' public remarks on trips into official notices without referring to notes".

== Notes ==
Political offices
Preceded by Han Zheng	First-ranked Vice Premier of China; 2023–present	Incumbent
Party political offices
Preceded by Chen Shiju	Director of the Office of the General Secretary of the Chinese Communist Party; 2013–2023	Succeeded by Han Shiming
Preceded by Li Zhanshu	Director of the General Office of the Chinese Communist Party; 2017–2023	Succeeded by Cai Qi
Order of precedence
Preceded by Cai Qi as Member of the Politburo Standing Committee of the Chinese Communist Party	Order of precedence of China as Member of the Politburo Standing Committee of the Chinese Communist Party	Succeeded by Li Xi as Member of the Politburo Standing Committee of the Chinese Communist Party
