= Han Shiming =

Chinese politician

- 韩世明

Director of the Office of the President of China
- Incumbent
- Assumed office 2024

Personal details
- Born: August 1971 (age 55) Zhejiang, China
- Party: Chinese Communist Party

Han Shiming (Chinese: 韩世明; pinyin: Hán Shìmíng; born August 1971) is a Chinese politician who is currently the director of the Office of the President of China.

== Biography ==
Han Shiming was born in Zhejiang in August 1971.

During Xi Jinping's tenure as the Party Secretary of Zhejiang, Han served as a secretary in the General Office of the Zhejiang Provincial Committee of the Chinese Communist Party. Han was later promoted as the Deputy Secretary-General of the Hangzhou Municipal Committee of the Chinese Communist Party and the Secretary of the Working Committee of the Municipal Directly Subordinate Organs, where he worked with Hangzhou Party Secretary Huang Kunming. After Huang moved to Beijing to work in the CCP Publicity Department in 2013, Huang joined him to move to Beijing.

In 2022, Han was elected as a delegate to the 20th National Congress of the Chinese Communist Party. In 2024, he was revealed to be the director of the Office of the President of China. As the director of the Office of the President, Han assists Xi Jinping in the day-to-day business of Xi's ceremonial and diplomatic role as state president.
