= Tan Tieniu =

Chinese researcher (born 1963)

- Simplified Chinese: 谭铁牛
- Traditional Chinese: 譚鐵牛
Transcriptions
Standard Mandarin
- Hanyu Pinyin: Tán Tiěniú

Tan Tieniu (Note: In this Chinese name, the family name is Tan.) FREng (Chinese: 谭铁牛) is the president of the World Data Organization and a professor at the Institute of Automation of the Chinese Academy of Sciences, China. Concurrently, he was deputy chief of the Hong Kong Liaison Office. He was the Chinese Communist Party Committee Secretary of Nanjing University from September 2022 to March 2026.

== Early life ==
Tan was born in Hunan Province, China, in October 1963. He joined the Chinese Communist Party (CCP) in 1983. He was educated in Xi'an Jiaotong University in 1984. In 1989, he received his PhD in Electrical and Electronics Engineering from Imperial College London.

== Career ==
Tan joined University of Reading, UK, as a research fellow after his Ph.D. In 1998, he returned to China. He joined Chinese Academy of Sciences as a professor at the Institute of Automation. He was a vice president at the Chinese Academy of Sciences (2013–2014). His research focuses on biometrics and pattern recognition. He was former President of the IEEE Biometrics Council. He is also the editor-in-chief of the International Journal on Automation and Computing. He is an adjunct professor at University of Science and Technology of China. From 2012 to 2016, he was given a grant to study "social perception data processing for public security". He was sanctioned by the US Government on 16 July 2021 under Executive Order 13936.

Throughout his career, he was also a member of the Standing Committee of the All-China Youth Federation, a Vice Chairman of the All-China Youth Federation of Central Party and State Organs. Chairman of the CAS Youth Federation. Vice President of the China Association for Young Scientists and Technologists, and the Inaugural President of the All-China Youth Federation’s Association of Returned Overseas Students. He was also a delegate to the 16th, 17th, 18th, and 19th Party National Congresses. He was the CCP Committee Secretary of Nanjing University from September 2022 to March 2026. In March 2026, he became the first president of the World Data Organization.

== Awards ==
Tan is a Fellow of IEEE, Fellow of the Royal Academy of Engineering, UK, and a Member of the Chinese Academy of Sciences. In 2001, he was given the honorary title National Outstanding Communist Party Member by the CCP Central Committee. In 2008, he was given the third prize in the Beijing Municipal Science and Technology Progress Award for his work in "real-time intelligent video surveillance early warning system and application". In 2011, he was given the second prize in National Science and Technology Progress Award for his research in "video content understanding technology and applications for security surveillance". In 2016, Tan became a laureate of the Asian Scientist 100 by the Asian Scientist.
