= Bao Tong =

Chinese writer and activist (1932–2022)

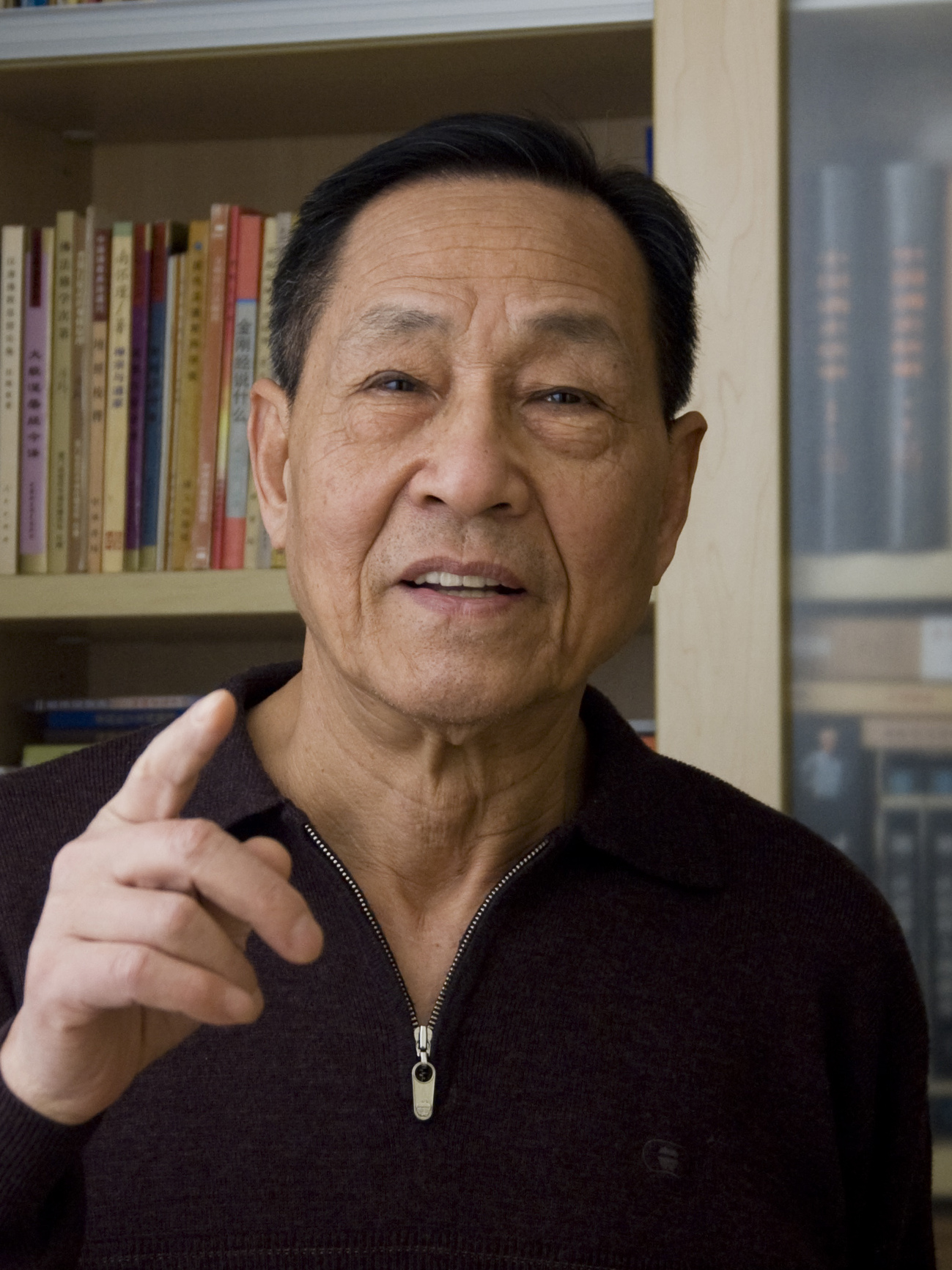
- Bao at his Beijing home in 2008
- Born: 5 November 1932; Haining, Republic of China
- Died: 9 November 2022 (aged 90); Beijing, People's Republic of China
- Political party: Chinese Communist Party (1949–1992, expelled)
- Spouse: Jiang Zongcao (died 2022)
- Children: Bao Pu (son); Bao Jian (daughter)

Chinese name
- Simplified Chinese: 鲍彤
- Traditional Chinese: 鮑彤
Transcriptions
Standard Mandarin
- Hanyu Pinyin: Bào Tóng

Bao Tong (Chinese: 鲍彤; 5 November 1932 – 9 November 2022) was a Chinese writer and activist. He was Director of the Office of Political Reform of the Central Committee of the Chinese Communist Party (CCP) and the Policy Secretary of Zhao Ziyang (Chinese Premier from 1980 to 1987 and CCP General Secretary from 1987 to 1989). He was also Director of the Drafting Committee for the CCP 13th Party Congresses, known for its strong support of market reform and opening up under Deng Xiaoping. Prior to this, he was a committee member and then deputy director of the Chinese State Commission for Economic Reform. During the 1989 Tiananmen Square protests, he was one of the very few Chinese senior officials to express understandings with the demonstrating students, which led to his arrest shortly before the massacre on June 4.

== Biography ==
=== Early life ===
Bao was born in Haining, Zhejiang Province, but he grew up and received his primary and secondary education in Shanghai. Through the influence of his uncle, Wu Shichang (a well-known political commentator in the 1930s-1940s and major contributor to The Observer, a key journal of Chinese liberal intellectuals), Bao turned to political liberalism and left-wing ideology promoted by the CCP, when he was still a high school student. He was studying at the Nanyang High School in Shanghai when he met his wife, Jiang Zongcao. She was an active member of the communist underground who was kicked out of many schools for organising demonstrations. Bao himself had also joined the underground Chinese Communist Party in 1949 before the CCP came to power, following the civil war.

=== Government career ===
Bao Tong was recruited to work for the newly established Communist government on the day he was taking entrance exams for university, during his lunch break. He was soon to be moved to Beijing where he was to work for the Organization Department under An Ziwen, who was to become an important mentor to him, until the beginning of the Cultural Revolution when they were both purged. Bao was to spend the rest of the Cultural Revolution doing hard labour in the countryside and in a factory.

Bao was reinstated after the Cultural Revolution and was recommended to Zhao Ziyang, Chinese Premier from 1980 to 1987 and CCP General Secretary from 1987 to 1989. Bao became Policy Secretary to Zhao, and was made the Director of the Office of Political Reform of the CCP Central Committee. In 1986, Zhao tasked Bao with plans for package reforms. Bao was Director of the Drafting Committee for the CCP 13th Party Congresses, which successfully passed a political reform package that attempted to end nepotism and separate party and state.

Prior to this, he was a committee member and then deputy director of the Chinese State Commission for Economic Reform. Bao was the political secretary of the Politburo Standing Committee between November 1987 and May 1989.

=== End of government career ===
Bao, along with Zhao Ziyang, helped Hungarian-American investor George Soros establish the Beijing-based Fund for the Reform and Opening of China (China Fund) in 1986. After Zhao and Bao were arrested in 1989, representatives from the organization were arrested and interrogated by Chinese authorities. Zhao's supporters expressed concern that the Chinese government wanted to link Bao and Zhao to "foreign subversive forces", including the Central Intelligence Agency (CIA). Soros denied any CIA involvement and wrote a letter to paramount leader Deng Xiaoping in defense of the fund.

On 28 May 1989, he was arrested in Beijing just before the suppression of the democracy movement in Tiananmen Square on 4 June 1989. Zhao Ziyang had resigned as General Secretary of the Chinese Communist Party in protest when Deng Xiaoping made the decision to crack down on the students. Bao Tong was a close associate of Zhao and the writer of his speeches and editorials supporting a democratic and legal approach to the student movement. Zhao was held under house arrest for the rest of his life, while Bao Tong was officially charged with "revealing state secrets and counter-revolutionary propagandizing", the highest government official to be charged in relation to the 1989 movement. He was publicly convicted in 1992 in a brief show trial and sentenced to seven years' imprisonment with two years deprivation of political rights. He served his full sentence in isolation at Qincheng Prison.

On 27 May 1996, when he was due to be released upon completing his prison sentence, he was instead held at a government compound in Xishan (outside Beijing) for an additional year, until his family agreed to move out of their apartment in town to one allocated for them by the authorities, where a 24-hour guarded gate and surveillance cameras were installed. Visitors were screened, the phone was tapped or cut off entirely, and Bao Tong was followed by an entourage of men the moment he stepped out of his home. Though he had moved to another apartment in Beijing, the system of surveillance and curtailing his phone calls, visitors and movements had followed him to his new home.

=== Later life ===
After his release in 1997, Bao Tong lived in West Beijing with his wife Jiang Zongcao, his daughter Bao Jian, and granddaughter Bao Yangyang. His son, Bao Pu, who had become a U.S. citizen, was restricted from entering China.

Bao Tong appealed for the restoration of civil and political rights of Zhao Ziyang from 1998 until Zhao's death. He was instrumental in the publication in May 2009 of Zhao Ziyang's memoir, based on audiotapes that Zhao made secretly while under house arrest and discovered after his death in 2005. Bao Tong's son Bao Pu, and daughter-in-law Renee Chiang, published the book Journey of Reform (改革歷程) in Hong Kong and translated and edited (along with Adi Ignatius) an English version of this book entitled Prisoner of the State: The Secret Journal of Premier Zhao Ziyang. Bao Tong wrote an introduction for the Chinese version.

Bao Tong continued to write articles openly critical of the government and its policies. He supported further democratic development in Hong Kong and continued to voice the need for political reform in China. He was a signer of the Charter 08 manifesto and called for the release of Liu Xiaobo, an organiser of the charter who was arrested in December 2008.

On 19 January 2005, the Washington Post reported that Bao Tong and his wife were injured in attacks by more than 20 plainclothes security agents as they attempted to leave their home to pay their respect to the family of Zhao Ziyang, who died on 17 January. The authorities would only allow him access to a doctor if he removed a white flower (traditional symbol of mourning) pinned to his vest. He refused. His wife, pushed to the ground by a policeman, received a bone fracture in her spine that resulted in her being hospitalized for three months.

On 1 January 2007, Reuters tested a new government relaxing of regulations on foreign reporters by visiting Bao Tong at his home, purportedly to conduct an interview about the 2008 Summer Olympic Games. Since then, several foreign reporters have done the same. The guards sometimes attempt to intimidate or deny visitation, but were apparently allowing most foreign reporters to enter, if prior arrangements were made. Local Chinese reporters were not included in this new relaxation of regulations.

Sky News reporter Peter Sharp describes his visit to Bao Tong in his blog.

Their home telephone continued to be tapped and periodically cut off, especially when overseas callers asked to speak to Bao Tong. He was followed everywhere he went, and was occasionally blocked from "sensitive" events or places, for example, the home of Zhao Ziyang while he was alive, and his funeral after his death in 2005. Bao was allowed to leave Beijing on three occasions since his arrest in 1989, the last time in 2009 for a holiday by invitation and escort of the Public Security from 22 May to 7 June, neatly avoiding the 20th anniversary of the Tiananmen Massacre. Visits from his son, Bao Pu, a resident of Hong Kong, were permitted by special arrangements only; under normal circumstances of application, he was unable to obtain a visa.

Bao died in Beijing on 9 November 2022, at the age of 90; the death was announced on Twitter by Bao Pu. Journalist Gao Yu, a close friend of Bao, stated that he had died of myelodysplastic syndrome, and that the funeral would take place on 15 November 2022.

== Quotes ==
- On CCP leadership: "We must correct all of Deng Xiaoping's mistakes. This is the only way to truly uphold Deng Xiaoping's vision. This is what it truly means to carry on Deng Xiaoping's work. Only when they acknowledge his mistakes and correct his mistakes can they stand taller than Deng Xiaoping. Otherwise they have no right to call themselves Deng Xiaoping's successors. They can only call themselves the successors of Deng Xiaoping's mistakes."
- On mourning Zhao Ziyang: "[his] life formed part of a heroic and mighty task, that of pioneering the protection of human rights and democracy for the Chinese people ... To mourn Zhao is to defend human rights. To mourn Zhao is to pursue democracy and the rule of law."
- On the 2008 Chinese milk scandal: "The tainted milk scandal shows us that the more dark secrets are exposed, the better. You can't cure the disease, or save the Chinese people, until you get to the root of the problem." "If the Chinese government tries to play down this incident, there will be no social stability in China, let alone harmony ... It will mean that this government has lost the most basic level of trust."

Party political offices
Preceded by Lin Mu (Hu Yaobang office)	Office Chief of the General Secretary of the Chinese Communist Party (Zhao Ziyang Office); January 1987 – June 1989	Succeeded by Jia Ting'an (Jiang Zemin office)
