= Zhou Ziyu =

Chinese military personnel

Zhou Ziyu (Chinese: 周子玉; Wade–Giles: Chou Tzu-yü; born November 1935) is a retired general of the Chinese People's Liberation Army Air Force (PLAAF). He served as deputy director of the PLA General Political Department from 1993 to 2000 and as Deputy Secretary of the Central Commission for Discipline Inspection from 1997 to 2002.

== Biography ==
Zhou was born in November 1935 in Wucheng County, Shandong Province. He enlisted in the People's Liberation Army in 1951, and studied at the PLAAF Aviation School from 1951 to 1954. He joined the Chinese Communist Party in 1955.

From 1977 to 1981 he served as director of the Political Department of the Lanzhou Military Region, and attained the rank of major general in 1988. He was appointed assistant director of the PLA General Political Department in 1992, and was promoted to deputy director (serving until 2000) and lieutenant general the following year.

Zhou attained the rank of full general on 23 January 1996. From 1997 to 2002, he was a member of the 15th Central Committee of the Chinese Communist Party, and a Deputy Secretary of the Central Commission for Discipline Inspection.
