= Emblem of the People's Liberation Army =

Versions
- Example 3D or physical presentation

- Military aircraft insignia
- Armiger: People's Liberation Army
- Adopted: 15 June 1949

The emblem of the People's Liberation Army is a five-pointed red star with a golden border and the golden Chinese characters 八 ("eight") and 一 ("one") in the middle of the star, referencing the Nanchang uprising on 1 August 1927. It is also known as the "August 1" military emblem. It was adopted 15 June 1949.

== History ==
During the existence of the Chinese Red Army, a military emblem was designed when the military flag was made, but It could not be promoted due to the shortage of war materials at that time. Later, the red five-star cap badge, the "Eighth Route Army" and "New Fourth Army" armbands, and the "Chinese People's Liberation Army" chest badge, which had been used before, played the role of military emblems to a certain extent.

In the winter of 1948, when the leaders of the Central Military Commission and the PLA headquarters discussed the issue of military regularization in Xibaipo, Hebei, they raised the issue of unifying the military flag and emblem. They decided that Zhou Enlai, vice chairman of the CMC, would preside over the work of the military flag and emblem, and Huang Zhen, then deputy director of the General Political Department Research Office and director of the First Research Office, would lead the design team. The collection, synthesis and research of the military flag and emblem styles were entrusted to the First Bureau of the Military Commission's Operations Department.

On 15 July 1949, the Preparatory Committee of the Chinese People's Political Consultative Conference opened. At the conference, the order "On the Announcement of the Style of the Flag and Emblem of the Chinese People's Liberation Army" was issued in the name of Mao Zedong, Chairman of the Chinese People's Revolutionary Military Commission, and Zhu De, Liu Shaoqi, Zhou Enlai, and Peng Dehuai, Vice Chairpersons of the Chinese People's Revolutionary Military Commission. The order pointed out that the style of the Chinese People's Liberation Army's military emblem is a five-pointed red star with a golden border and the golden words "August 1" in the middle, also known as the "August 1" military emblem.

== Symbolism ==
The red five-pointed star symbolizes the liberation of the Chinese people, and "August 1" refers to the Nanchang uprising that took place on August 1, 1927, which marked the birth of the People's Liberation Army.

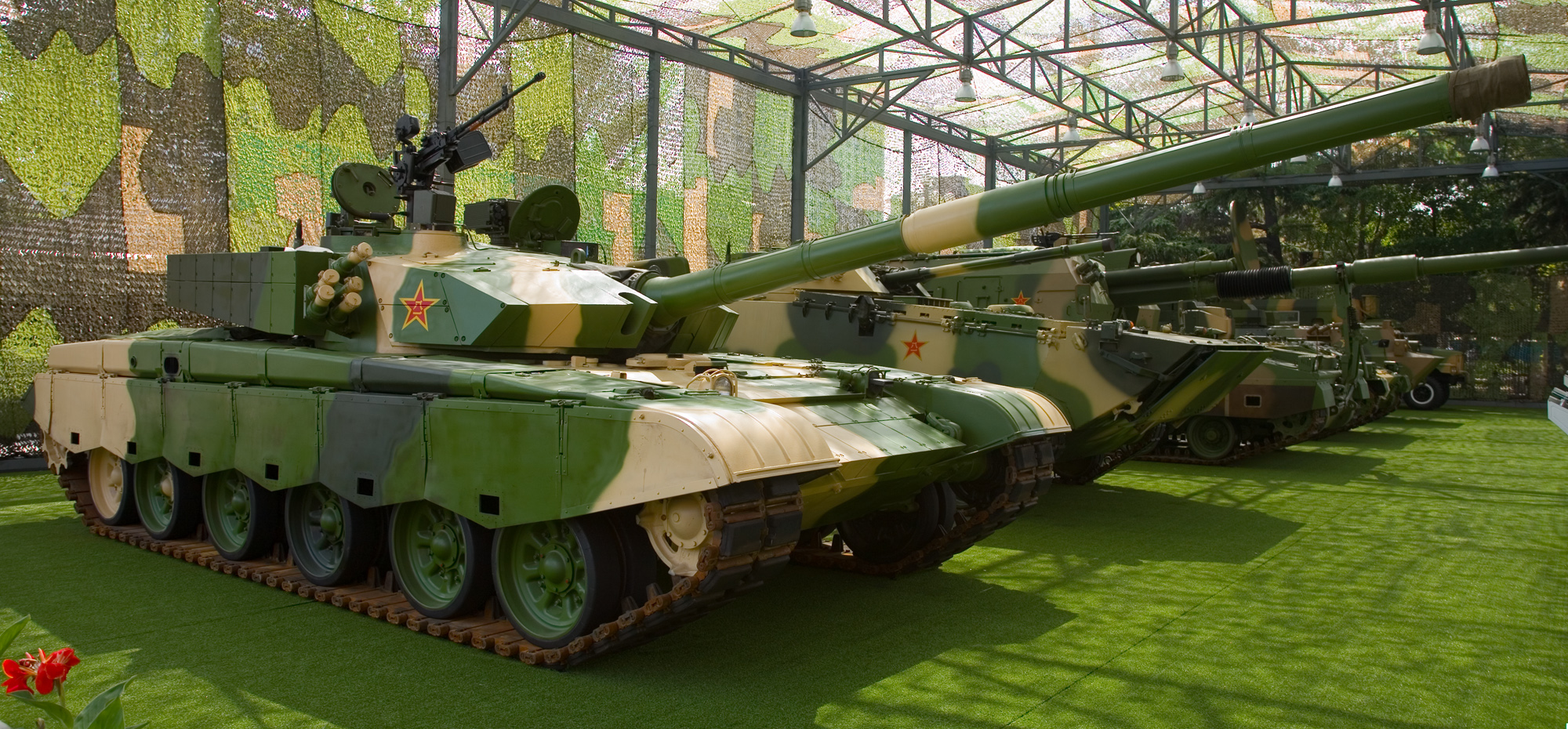
The emblem being used as roundels on PLA combat vehicles.

== Use ==
The emblem of the People's Liberation Army of China is commonly used on the PLA's cap badges, armbands, awards, vehicles, ships, aircraft and important buildings. It is usually hung in the center of the rostrum during ceremonies, inspections, military oaths and grand gatherings.
