= Zhongnanhai =

Government complex and former garden in Beijing

Zhongnanhai 中南海
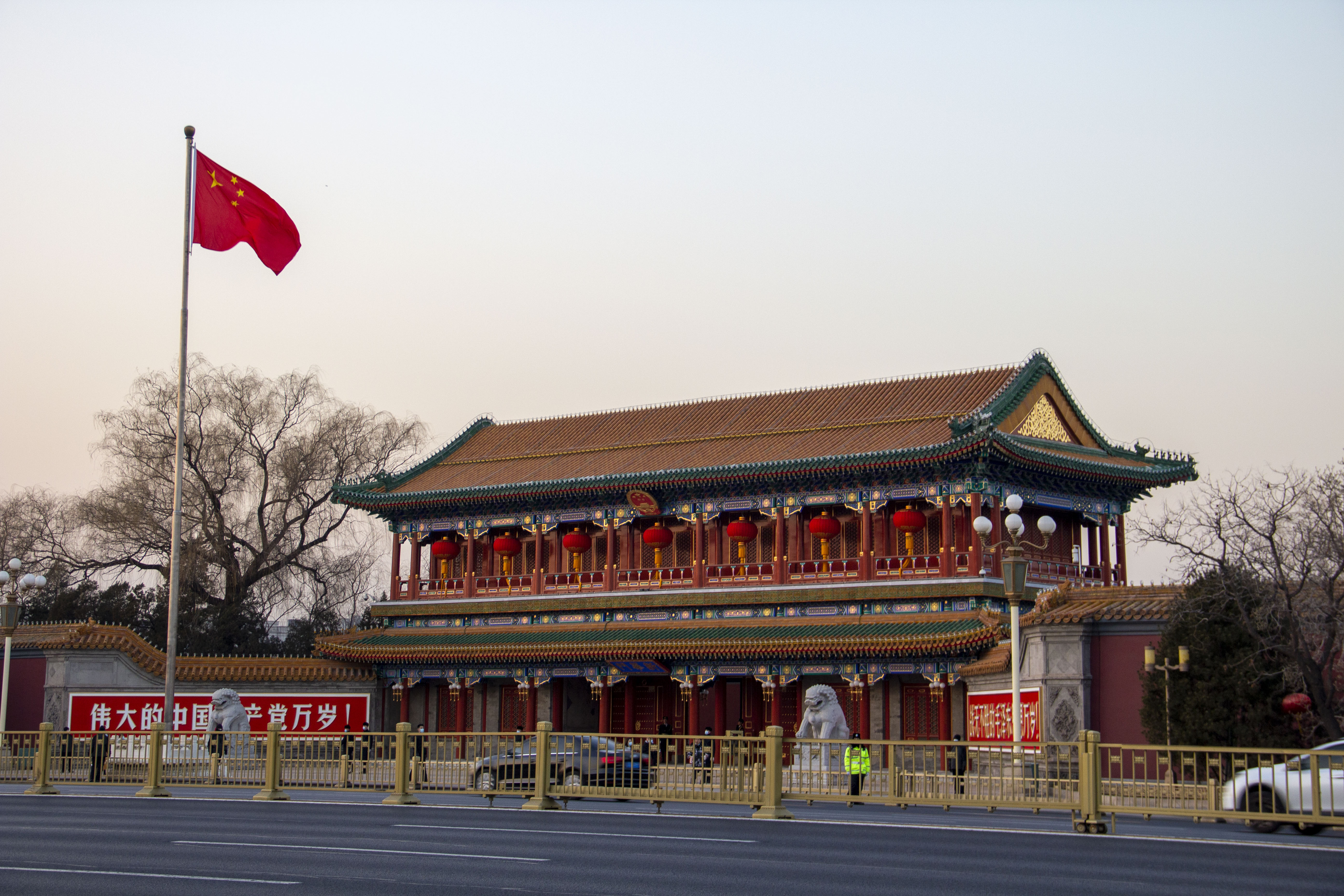
- Xinhuamen, the "Gate of New China", built by Yuan Shikai, today the formal entrance to the Zhongnanhai compound

General information
- Architectural style: Traditional Chinese architecture
- Location: 174 Chang'an Avenue, Xicheng District, Beijing
- Coordinates: 39°54′41″N 116°22′50″E
- Current tenants: General Secretary of the Chinese Communist Party; Office of the General Secretary; Politburo of the Chinese Communist Party; Politburo Standing Committee; Secretariat of the Chinese Communist Party; Central Committee General Office; President of China; Vice President of China; Premier of China; Vice Premiers of China; State Council; State Council General Office; State Council Research Office

Chinese name
- Chinese: 中南海
- Literal meaning: "Central and Southern Seas"
Transcriptions
Standard Mandarin
- Hanyu Pinyin: Zhōngnánhǎi
- Wade–Giles: Chung^{1}-nan^{2}-hai^{3}
- IPA: [ʈʂʊ́ŋ.nǎn.xàɪ]

Zhongnanhai (Chinese: 中南海) is a compound which houses the offices of and serves as a residence for the leadership of the Chinese Communist Party (CCP) and the State Council. It is a former imperial garden, and located adjacent to the Forbidden City in Beijing. The term "Zhongnanhai" is often used as a metonym for China's central government and its leadership at large.

The party and state leaders, including the general secretary of the CCP as well as the paramount leader, and other top party and state leadership figures carry out many of their day-to-day administrative activities inside the compound, such as meetings with foreign dignitaries. China Central Television (CCTV) frequently shows footage of meetings inside the compound, but limits its coverage largely to views of the interior of buildings. Though numerous maps of the complex exist from before the founding of the People's Republic of China, the interior layout of Zhongnanhai has been altered significantly since then, including a wave of major renovations in the 1970s. Today many buildings share the names of older, pre-PRC structures, but have completely changed in layout and purpose. The complex is divided into two main sections, reflecting the parallel authority of the highest level of state and party institutions in the country. Northern Zhongnanhai is used as the headquarters of the State Council and includes the offices of its senior most leaders as well as its principal meeting rooms. Southern Zhongnanhai is the headquarters of the CCP Central Committee, including its staff and its highest level coordinating institutions, such as the Standing Committee, Politburo and Secretariat.

The current basic outline of Zhongnanhai emerged during the Ming dynasty when the Yongle Emperor began a project to subdivide and reclaim land around Taiye Lake in order to create a garden retreat. By the late Qing dynasty, Zhongnanhai was used as the de facto center of government, with Empress Dowager Cixi and later Prince Regent Chun building residences there instead of the Forbidden City. After the establishment of the Republic of China, the new president, Yuan Shikai remodeled Zhongnanhai to become the formal center of what would become known as the Beiyang Government. In late 1949, CCP Chairman Mao Zedong moved into the complex after initially staying in the suburbs. Mao received many important foreign leaders in Zhongnanhai, including Nikita Khrushchev, Che Guevara, Richard Nixon, Georges Pompidou, Kakuei Tanaka and Zulfikar Ali Bhutto, among others. Mao's favorite places in Zhongnanhai were the Library of Chrysanthemum Fragrance (his personal residence, filled with bookshelves) and the Poolside House, next to the large indoor swimming pool, where he would spend much of the day swimming or reading books and reports by the pool. After Mao's death, the Chrysanthemum Library along with many of his belongings was preserved as a museum which is no longer accessible to the general public.

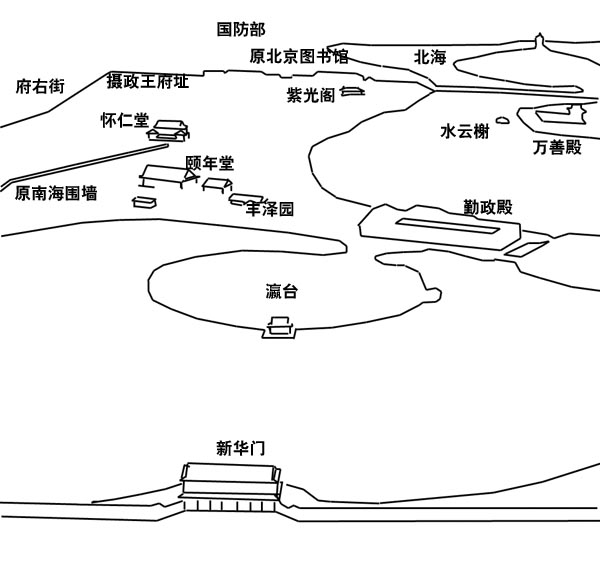
A schematic diagram of Zhongnanhai. At the bottom (south) of the diagram is Xinhua Gate (1758). The island on the foreground lake is Yingtai Island (1421). To the northeast of Yingtai is Qinzheng Hall (1980) while to the northwest is Beneficence Garden (1722). Huairen Hall (1888) is in the center-west and Ziguang Hall (1567) is in the north.

Contemporary layout of Zhongnanhai. Note that Benevolence Hall and Wanzi Gallery are now defunct, and Qinzheng Hall and Yanqing House were rebuilt.

== Location ==
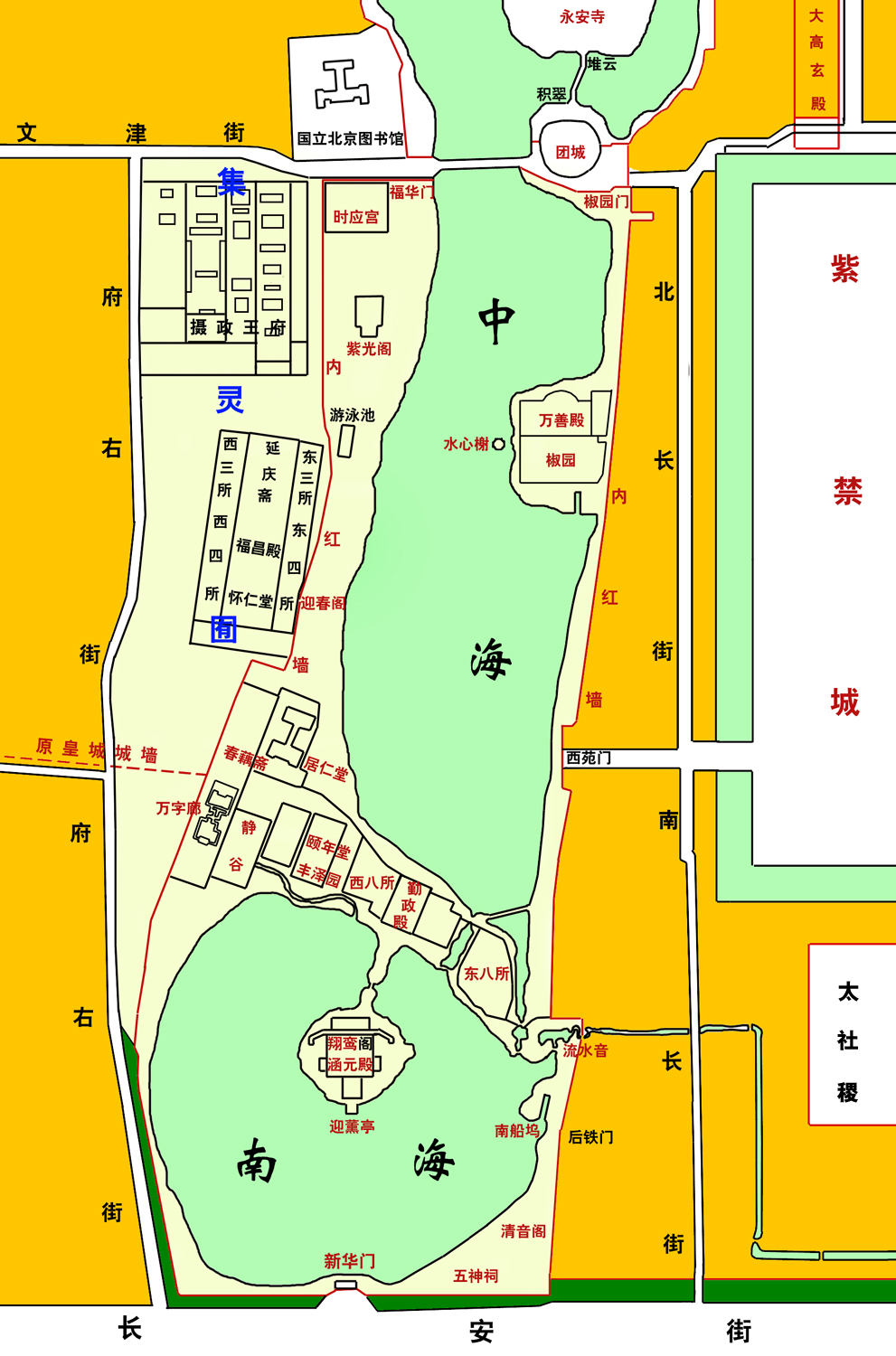
A map of Zhongnanhai from the Republican era, with water colored green. The western edge of the Forbidden City is visible on the right.

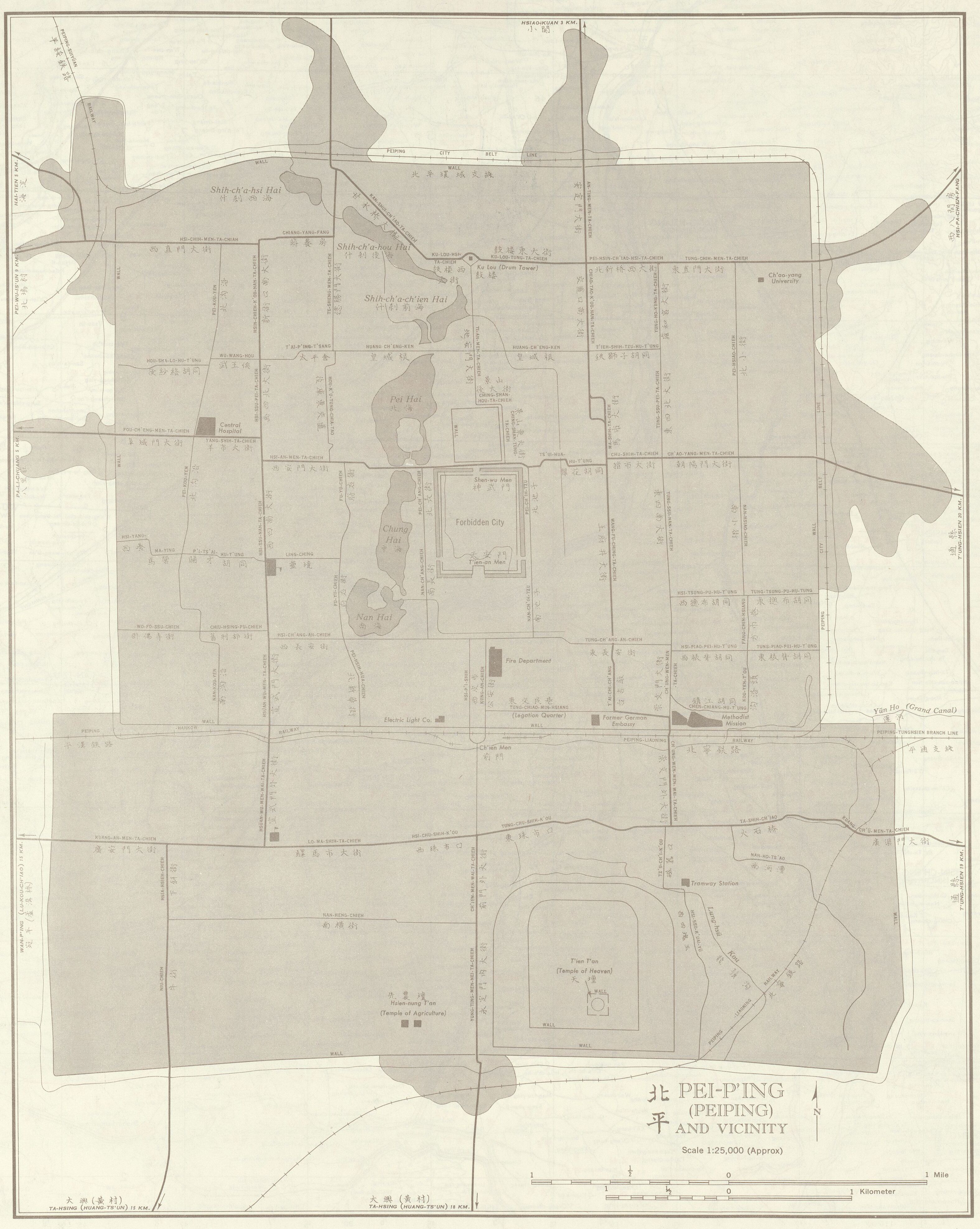
Map including Zhongnanhai (labeled as Chung Hai 中海 and Nan Hai 南海) (1950s)

The name of the Zhongnanhai complex, immediately west of the Forbidden City, means "Central and Southern Seas" referring to two lakes, the Central Sea (中海) and Southern Sea (南海), within the compound; it is sometimes translated as "Sea Palaces". The two lakes were part of a series of projects carried out during the construction of the Imperial City. The corresponding "Northern Sea", or "Beihai" (北海) to the north is now a public park. The interconnected Northern, Central and Southern Seas are jointly called the Taiye Lake (太液池); adjacent Shichahai (什剎海, lit. 'Sea with Ten Temples') is connected to Beihai through Qianhai.

The Taiye Lake originally formed the core of an imperial garden called Western Park (Xiyuan; 西苑) or Western Court (Xinei; 西内; 西內), with parklands on the shores, enclosed by a red wall in the western part of the Imperial City. Most of the pavilions, shrines, and temples survive from this period. Whereas the Northern Sea had a religious focus, the shores of Central and Southern Seas were dotted with a number of worldly palaces.

== History ==
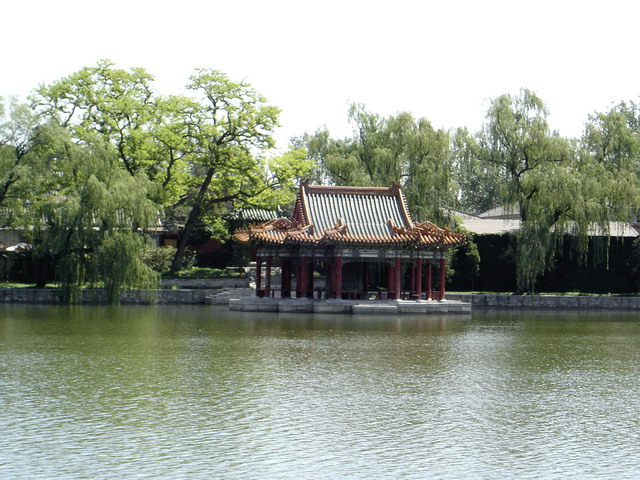
The Pavilion of the Water and Cloud, on the eastern bank of the Central Sea.

During the Jin dynasty (1115–1235), Emperor Zhangzong of Jin built the northern lake in 1189. The northern section of Zhongnanhai was the original Taiye Lake, with an attached palace called the "Palace of Great Peace" (Daninggong). During the Yuan dynasty, which lasted from 1271 to 1368, Taiye Lake was included within the Imperial City. It was also expanded, covering approximately the area occupied by the Northern and Central Seas today. Three new palaces were built around the lake.

After the Ming dynasty moved its capital to Beijing in 1403 by order of the Yongle Emperor, construction of the now extant Imperial Palace began in 1406. The new Ming palace was built to the south of the Yuan dynastic palace, as a result, a new Southern Sea was dug to the south of the existing lake. The excavated soil, together with that from the construction of the palace moat, was piled up to form Jingshan, a hill to the north of the Forbidden City. At this time, the three lakes were connected through channels and collectively called the Taiye Lake, part of the extensive royal park called Xiyuan (西苑, lit. Western Park) that extended from the western wall of the Imperial City to the western wall of the Forbidden City. In the middle period of the Ming dynasty, Zhengde Emperor and Jiajing Emperor built many more palaces, Taoist temples and pavilions around the lakes and spent more time here rather than in the Forbidden City.

After the Qing dynasty established its capital in Beijing, the government reduced the size of Xiyuan to the area centered around the three lakes enclosed by a small wall, portions of which form the basis of Zhongnanhai's current boundary. During the late Qing dynasty, several gatehouses were built on both sides of Jin'ao Yudong Bridge, giving Zhongnanhai and Beihai Park separate wall enclosures within Xiyuan. Several successive emperors built pavilions and houses along the lakeshores of Zhongnanhai, where they would carry out government duties in the summer. During the reign of the Empress Dowager Cixi, both the Empress Dowager and the Emperor would often live in the Zhongnanhai compound, traveling to the Forbidden City only for ceremonial duties.

During the Boxer Rebellion of 1899–1901, allied troops occupied Zhongnanhai. Almost all artifacts and decorations in the compound were looted. Later, the Eight-Nation Alliance commander also lived in Zhongnanhai. When Puyi was crowned Emperor, his father as the Prince Regent lived for a short time in the compound.

Zhongnanhai continued to be politically significant during the first years of the Republic of China, as the Beiyang Government under Yuan Shikai placed its presidential palace in the Zhongnanhai compound from 1912. This decision was made because the regime wished to house its government close to the historical center of power, the Forbidden City, even though it could not use the Forbidden City itself because the abdicated Emperor Puyi still lived there. The current main gate, Xinhuamen or "Gate of New China", was created by Yuan Shikai. The present "gatehouse" was previously a pavilion located on the southern shore the Southern Sea, close to the southern wall. Entry to the compound was instead directly from the Forbidden City. Yuan wished to create a new entrance from Chang'an Avenue, independent of the Forbidden City. Thus the pavilion was modified to become a gatehouse, with nearby walls cut back, resulting in the angled walls near the entrance today. Yuan renamed Zhongnanhai Palace of the New China or Xinhua Palace (新华宫) during his brief reign as Emperor of China. When the Republic of China government moved its capital to Nanjing, the Zhongnanhai compound was opened to the public as a park.

After the CCP's Capture of Beijing in 1949, the party's senior leadership began plans to relocate their headquarters to the old capital, but they did not initially agree on the location of their central workplace. Mao and the other party leaders initially made their headquarters at Xiangshan Park, in the city's suburbs. As part of the planning for the first Chinese People's Political Consultative Conference Zhou Enlai decided that, with some modifications, Huairen Hall in Zhongnanhai would be ideal, but he did not initially recommend it during meetings to become the party headquarters. In these early months, Zhou would commute into Beijing for work. However, because of the poor quality of the roads, he would often stay at Zhongnanhai instead of traveling home in the evening. It was Ye Jianying, the interim administrator of Beijing, who ultimately recommended Zhongnanhai as the party headquarters for security reasons. Mao initially refused to move into Zhongnanhai because of its imperial associations. Zhou Enlai nonetheless agreed to the move, as did the majority of the Politburo. Since then, Zhongnanhai has served as the principal center of government in the People's Republic of China.

When the CCP leaders first moved into the compound, many of the buildings were dilapidated and gardens overgrown from years of neglect. Zhongnanhai also lacked either a modern administrative office complex or a purpose-built auditorium for government meetings. These deficiencies prompted the construction of West Building compound and the complete remodeling of Huairen Hall by 1954, along with numerous other architectural changes. Early party and state leaders were assigned residences in Zhongnanhai on an ad hoc basis, often using houses built for servants of the Qing court, or by repurposing buildings intended for other purposes.

=== In contemporary times ===
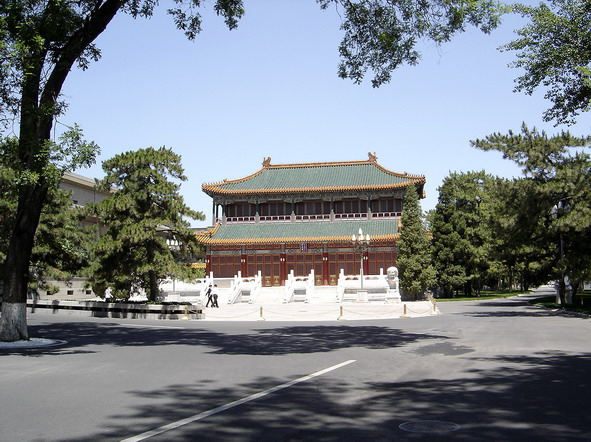
The Hall of Purple Light (Ziguang Ge 紫光阁) today, used for state receptions.

Since Zhongnanhai became the central government compound, it has been mostly inaccessible to the general public. The exception to this was during the years of relative freedom following the end of the Cultural Revolution, when the compound was open to members of the public, who could obtain tickets to visit the compound from relevant government authorities. Following the political turmoil that culminated in the 1989 Tiananmen Square protests and massacre, security was greatly increased. Access has now been closed to the general public, with numerous plain clothed military personnel patrolling the area on foot. However, cars are not strictly prohibited from stopping on stretches of adjacent roadway and cabs are allowed to stop except during important conferences or events. Nonetheless, in April 1999, approximately 10,000 Falun Gong practitioners were able to organize a silent vigil surrounding Zhongnanhai.

The most important entrance to the compound is the southern one at Xinhuamen (Xinhua Gate, or "Gate of New China"), surrounded by two slogans: "long live the great Chinese Communist Party" and "long live the invincible Mao Zedong Thought." The view behind the entrance is shielded by a traditional screen wall with the slogan "Serve the People", written in the handwriting of Mao Zedong. The Xinhuamen entrance lies on the north side of West Chang'an Avenue.

Zhongnanhai is considered the de jure residence of the CCP Politburo Standing Committee members and other senior leaders for electoral purposes. Though it serves as their formal residence, many senior party leaders do not actually live in Zhongnanhai, preferring to live in homes elsewhere in the city. Several more recent leaders, such as then General Secretary and paramount leader Hu Jintao reportedly chose to live in the Jade Spring Hill compound in western Beijing due to overcrowding inside Zhongnanhai. China's current leader Xi Jinping also has a home in Jade Spring Hill. There continues to be no standardized system for awarding certain houses to leaders of a certain rank in Zhongnanhai. After a senior leader's death, their spouse is often permitted to stay in the house indefinitely. Several of these houses were occupied by the families of their original post-revolution residents into the 1990s.

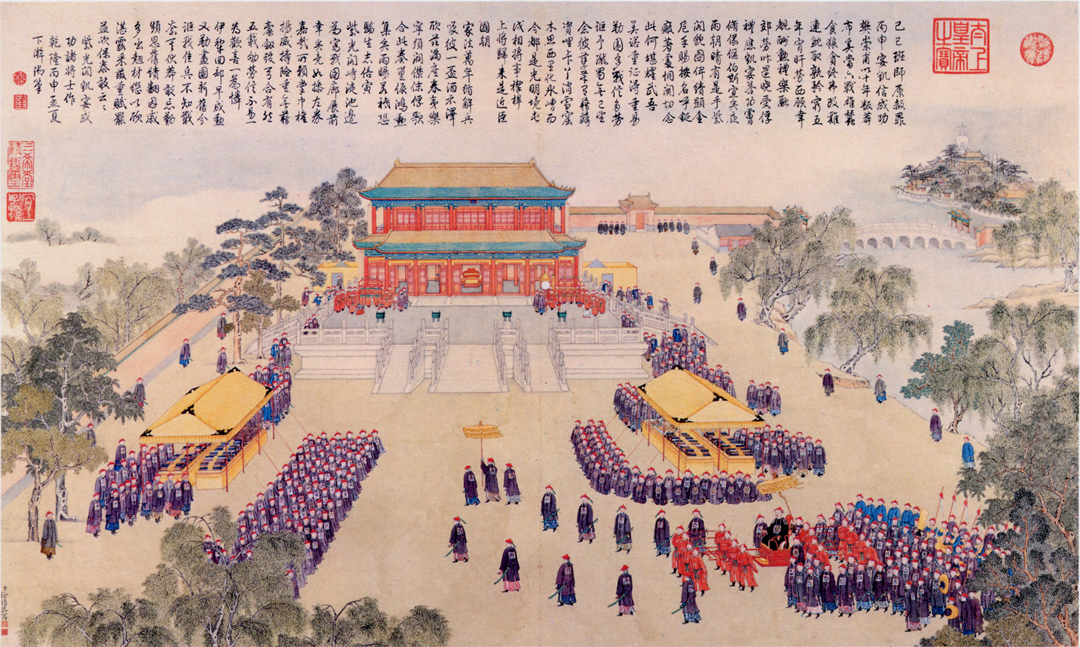
Late 18th-century painting showing the reception for the victorious Qing Army from the Jinchuan campaign (1771–1776) at the Hall of Purple Light in Zhongnanhai

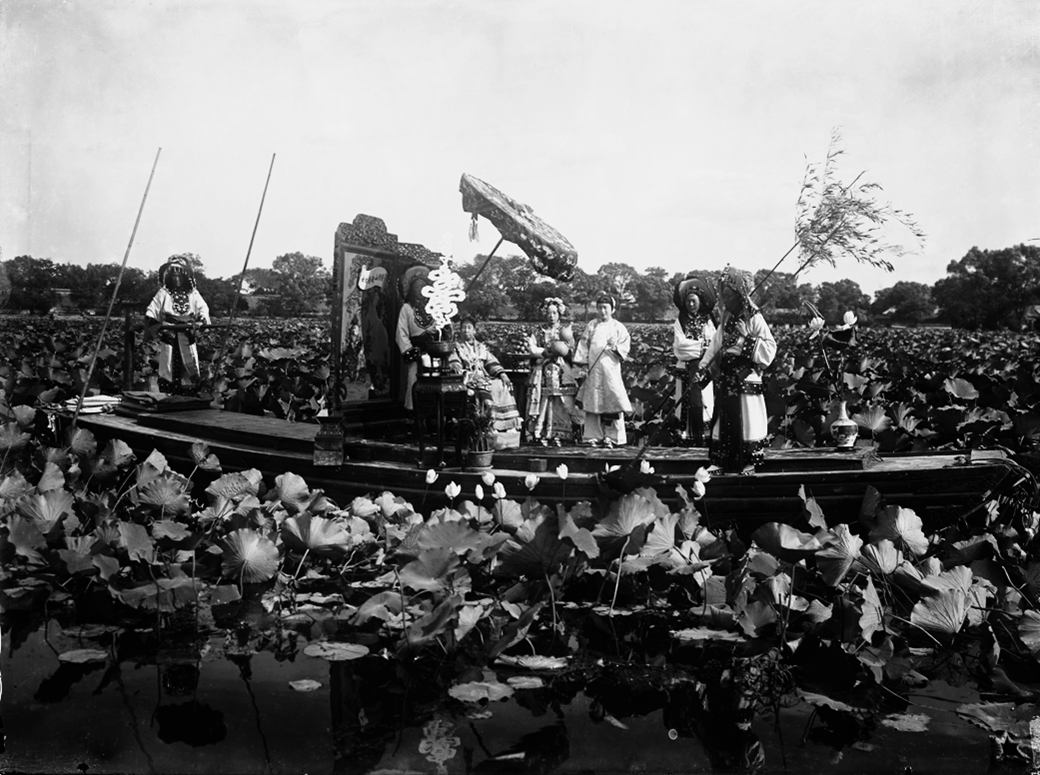
The Empress Dowager Cixi and servants on a boat in Zhonghai in the early 1900s.

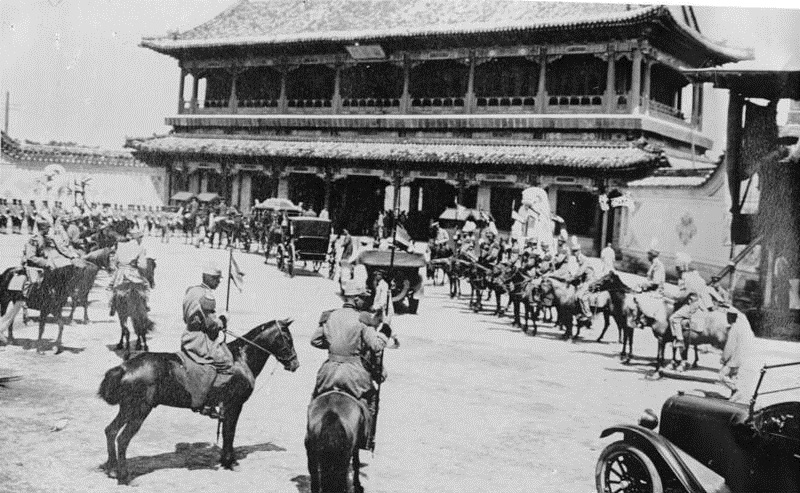
Procession of Leo Karakhan, USSR Ambassador to China 1923–26, outside the Xinhua Gate of Zhongnanhai.

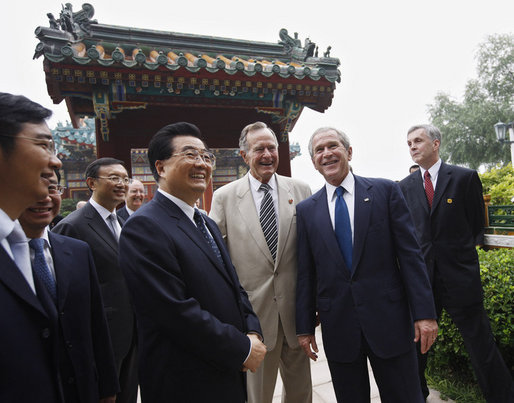
Chinese leader Hu Jintao with U.S. President George W. Bush and former U.S. President George H. W. Bush at Yingtai in Zhongnanhai on August 10, 2008.

== Internal layout ==
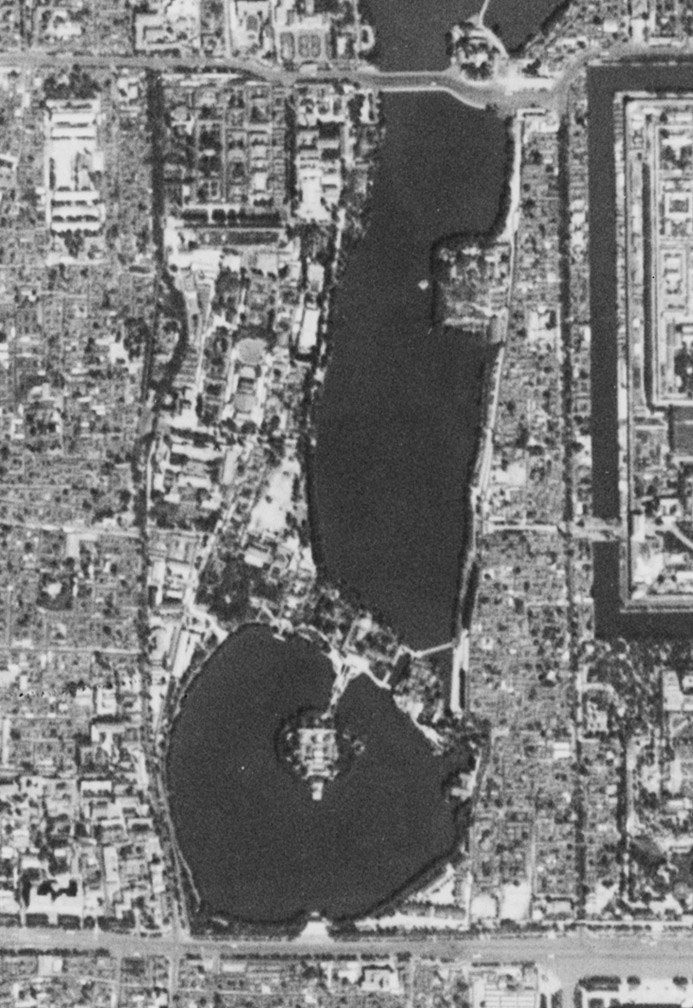
An annotated map of Zhongnanhai. Click on the links for more information about each building.

=== Central Sea ===
The buildings around the Central Sea (中海) constitute the headquarters of the State Council of the People's Republic of China and its affiliate institutions, including the offices of the premier and the vice premiers as well as the State Council General Office. Important guests, both foreign and domestic, are typically received here in the northern half of Zhongnanhai. This area is also known as the North District (北区).

==== Regent Palace ====
The original Regent Palace (攝政王府; 摄政王府) was a large siheyuan-style mansion that took up most of the northwestern corner of Zhongnanhai. Though most of the building no longer exists, it is now the site of the principal meeting areas and offices of the State Council. The large three story building that occupies much the south western area of the former Regent Palace is the location of the State Council Office Secretariat, which facilitates the State Council's plenary sessions. Altogether, the State Council possesses a total of six numbered meeting rooms which are used to convene conferences and policymaking sessions. Conference rooms one and two are located on either side of a thirty-meter corridor which is used for informational exhibits and displays relevant to State Council activities. This corridor is located at the south end of the former Regent Palace area. Both the full State Council and the weekly meetings of the State Council Standing Committee are convened in conference room number one.

During the Ming dynasty, the Jiajing Emperor built Wanshou Palace in this area as his main living palace within Zhongnanhai. Nothing remained of this palace by the late Qing era, however. The building that came to be known as Regent Palace took its name from Puyi's regent Zaifeng, Prince Chun. Prince Chun was given the land to build his palace here in 1909, though the building was not completed by the time the Qing dynasty ended in 1911. Under the Republic of China, the building was initially the location of the prime minister's office and the meeting place of the cabinet. In 1918, President Xu Shichang switched the president's residence and the prime minister's office, relocating his residence to Regent Palace, while the prime minister and Cabinet moved to Dianxu Hall in the Garden of Abundant Beneficence. When Huairen Hall became the Presidential residence in 1923, Regent Palace became the location of the army and naval department.

After 1949, the People's Republic of China again used the building as the headquarters of the premier and the State Council. Though the building was beginning to show its age at the time, initially Premier Zhou Enlai resisted renovation efforts citing a commitment to fiscal austerity. During a massive renovation of Zhongnanhai in the late 1970s, plans were made to modernize Regent palace as well. It was found, however, that the quality of the building was very poor, the foundations were loose and the gaps between the wooden columns were filled with broken bricks. As a result, the upper and entrance halls were torn down and rebuilt completely. The location where these halls once stood is currently the location of several of the State Council's conference rooms.

==== West Flower Hall ====
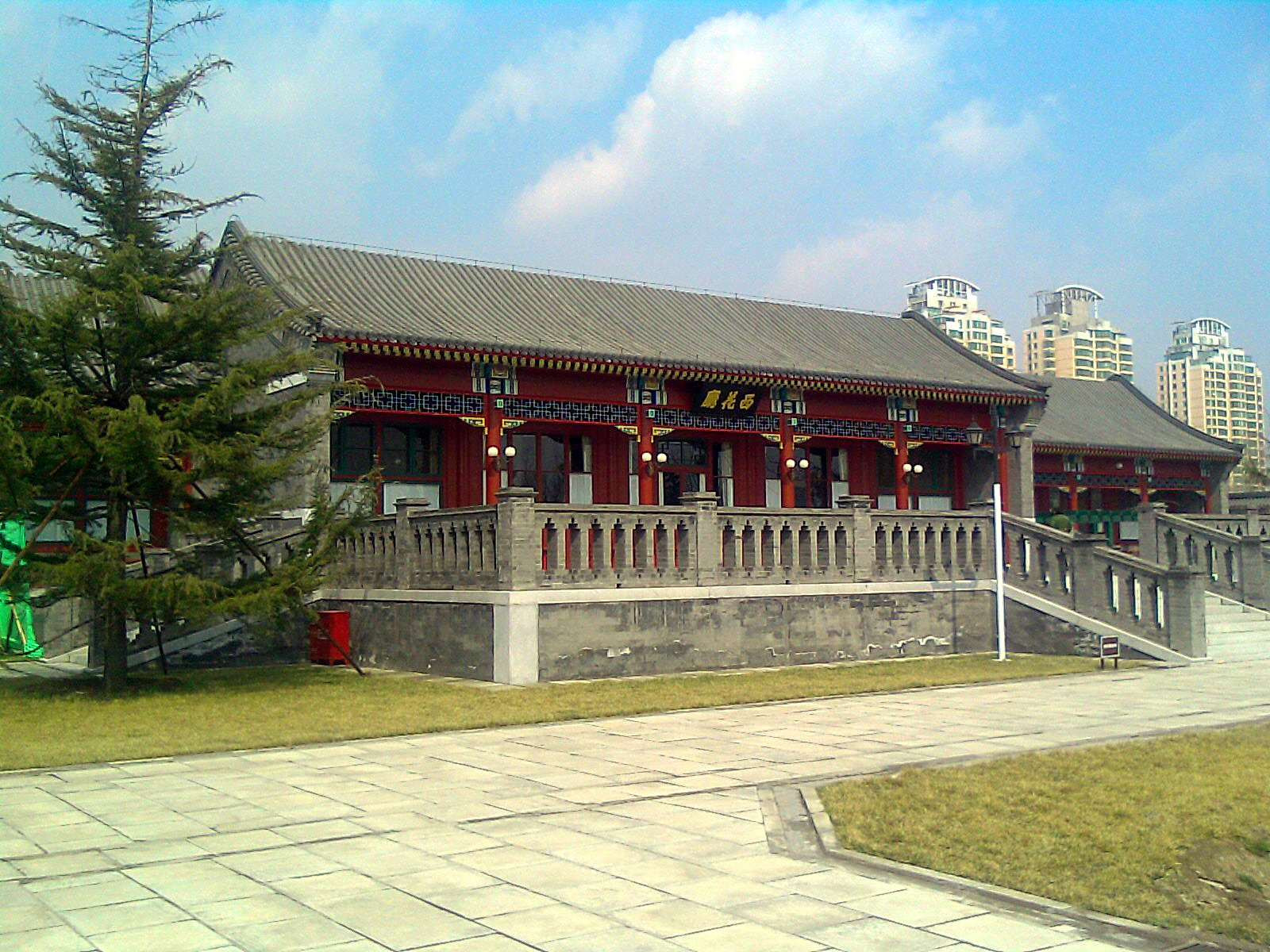
A replica of West Flower Hall built in Tianjin

Located in the northwestern corner of Zhongnanhai, West Flower Hall (西花厅; 西花廳) was constructed as the living quarters to Regent Palace. West Flower Hall hence served as Premier Zhou Enlai's personal residence. The building has two courtyards. The front courtyard was where Zhou would meet and dine with foreign guests, while the back courtyard included Zhou's personal office, bedroom and meeting rooms. After Zhou's death, his wife Deng Yingchao continued to live here until 1990. Immediately adjoining to West Flower Hall is the slightly smaller East Flower Hall (東花厅), which became the residence of Vice Premier Li Xiannian in the mid-1950s. East Flower Hall once had a rockery courtyard that was the location of one of the State Council's conference rooms during the Zhou Enlai era.

During the large scale demolition and redevelopment of Regent Palace, Wang Dongxing built a large house adjacent to both West and East Flower Halls for Paramount Leader Hua Guofeng. When Hua Guofeng was forced from power, he exchanged this house with Li Xiannian and moved to Li Xiannian's temporary residence outside of Zhongnanhai. Li Xiannian and his family subsequently lived here through his presidency until his death, after which, his wife Lin Jiamei continued to occupy the residence. In 1996, Li Peng attempted to claim West Flower Hall as his post premiership residence. Li Peng was motivated in part by the relationship he had with Zhou Enlai and Deng Yingchao as their foster son. Li Peng's efforts were unsuccessful, however, and West Flower Hall subsequently became part of the North Courtyard Core (北院核心) residence assigned to Lin Jiamei. Lin Jiamei was reportedly still living here as late as 2014.

==== Premier's Office ====
The modern workplace of the premier and the vice premiers of the State Council, the Premier's Office (总理办公室) was built during the large scale renovation of Regent Palace in the 1970s. Unlike the offices of CCP officials in the West Building Compound, which are assigned to specific individuals and do not necessarily change if the individual loses their title or role, the offices of the premier and vice premier are assigned specifically to the incumbent holders of those positions and their occupants must move out when their term ends. The premier's office does not have a front gate and courtyard like other buildings in the former Regent Palace area, instead featuring a covered access ramp. Immediately to the south is a building that serves as the headquarters for the State Council General Office.

==== Fourth Conference Room ====
The State Council's Fourth Conference Room (第四会议室) is located in a building specifically dedicated to this purpose. It is used for meetings between State Council officials and specially invited persons who are often not affiliated with the government. There is a large traditional Chinese gate and courtyard in front of the fourth conference room that is used for photo opportunities between State Council officials and their guests. In Regent Palace's original configuration as built by Prince Chun, the area where the fourth conference room is located was known as Yin'an Hall (银安殿; 銀安殿). The Fourth Conference Room was last rebuilt in 2003.

==== Ziguang Hall ====
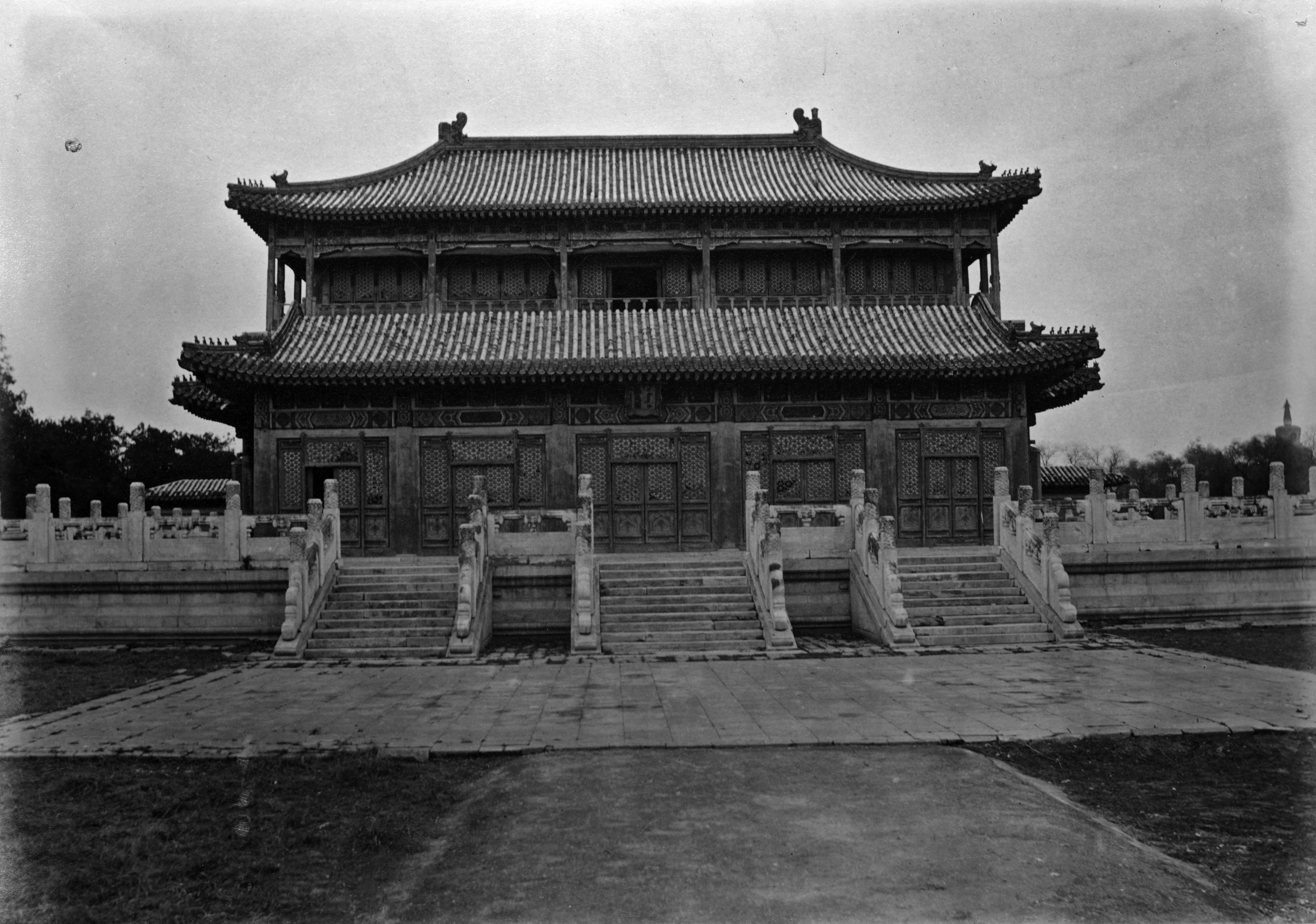
Ziguang Hall, circa 1879

Literally translated as Hall of Purple Light (Ziguangge; 紫光阁; 紫光閣), Ziguang Hall is a two-storey pavilion located on the northern west bank of the Central Sea. Immediately behind Ziguang Hall is another pavilion called Wucheng Hall (武成殿) which connects to Ziguang Hall to form a courtyard. In the Ming dynasty, it was originally a platform built by the Zhengde Emperor for military exercise. His successor, the Jiajing Emperor, built Ziguang Hall here as a replacement for the platform. The building was rebuilt during the Qing dynasty by the Kangxi Emperor, who would use the location to inspect his bodyguards. During the reign of the Qianlong Emperor the building was used to display battle wall charts and seized weapons. The building was also known as the Hall of Barbarian Tributes and was used to receive tribute missions to the Emperor. In 1873 and 1891, the emperors Tongzhi and Guangxu, respectively, received envoys from the foreign legations in Beijing, in the hall. After 1949 the building was occasionally used for dances. A large modern conference area was later built on the building's western side. Ziguang Hall is used today as the main reception area in Zhongnanhai for meeting with foreign diplomats and conducting talks with world leaders. Wucheng Hall is often used for photo opportunities in which a Chinese leader will be pictured sitting alongside their visiting counterpart.

The Auditorium of the State Council is connected to the western side of Ziguang Hall. In the early years after 1949, the State Council Auditorium was used as a movie theatre which held showings several times a week. The building also formerly served as the canteen for State Council staff. This auditorium was updated to its present form in 1979 and is primarily used for ceremonies and conferences on specific policy issues. The plenary sessions of the full State Council are also occasionally convened here as well.

Immediately adjacent to Ziguang Hall are a variety of other institutions and facilities such as the State Council Research Office and the Zhongnanhai north district's canteen. Between 2003 and 2013, there was also a roughly 300-square-meter supermarket store belonging to the Sichuan-based Hongqi chain located near Ziguang Hall.

==== Tennis Court ====
Initial plans to build an indoor tennis court in the State Council section of Zhongnanhai were made in the late 1980s. At the time China was receiving a significant influx of new diplomatic delegations on international exchange trips. Feeling that the facilities for hosting these diplomats at Ziguang Hall at the time were inadequate, some officials proposed that a guest lounge and tennis court be built nearby. The proposal for an indoor tennis court was, at the time, vetoed by Vice Premier Tian Jiyun. In spite of this initial resistance, an outdoor tennis court was built in Zhongnanhai by the early 2000s. In 2006, the building around the tennis court was rebuilt and modernized. Immediately to the north of the tennis court is the Zhongnanhai clinic.

==== Indoor Pool ====
An indoor swimming pool was built in 1955 by the Urban Construction and Design Institute. Mao Zedong's wife Jiang Qing reportedly proposed the building's construction during Mao's absence in order to secure its approval. Mao nonetheless used the pool because it was more convenient than traveling to the pool at Tsinghua University. Mao often stayed and worked at the pool for long periods of time. In 1958, Mao met with Soviet General Secretary Nikita Khrushchev at the pool. During the time when Mao lived nearby at Poolside House, the indoor swimming pool was remodeled and enlarged under the supervision of Zhongnanhai's head engineer Tian Genggui. Today the pool is used by senior party leaders and also contains a workout area.

==== Poolside House ====
The Zhongnanhai outdoor swimming pool was built in 1933 as a public–private partnership when Zhongnanhai was a public park. Tickets were sold to Beijing citizens each year from May to August. From 1946 to 1949, it was difficult to operate the pool profitably due to high inflation. After Zhongnanhai was taken over for the exclusive use of the government, a poolside house was built next to the swimming pool as a residence for Mao Zedong. It was initially built for practical reasons, as Mao would frequently spend much of the day either swimming in the pool or reading political and historical books and reports from government officials by the pool's side. Therefore, a reception room, a bedroom and a study with Mao's favorite books were built, thus creating the Poolside House which allowed Mao to be permanently close to the swimming pool. Eventually, among Zhongnanhai staff, the phrase "you are wanted at the swimming pool" meant that they were ordered to immediately report to Mao.

Mao permanently left the Chrysanthemum Library and moved into the Poolside House in 1966, at the beginning of the Cultural Revolution. Especially in his later years, the Poolside House would be the place for visiting foreign leaders to see Mao. This was the case for Richard Nixon and Kakuei Tanaka. After Mao's death in 1976, Zhou Enlai's wife Deng Yingchao briefly lived at poolside house during the extensive redevelopment of the Regent Palace area before returning to West Flower Hall. During the 1989 Tiananmen Square Protests, President Yang Shangkun moved into Zhongnanhai and lived at Poolside House due to security concerns created by the protesters.

==== Yanqing House ====
Yanqing House (延庆楼; 延慶樓), as well as several other adjoining buildings, was built during the Beiyang Government around 1922. During his time as de facto ruler of the Beiyang Government, Cao Kun used Yanqing House as his workplace while living in nearby Huairen Hall. His wives and concubines lived in several of the adjoining buildings. After Cao Kun was overthrown in 1924, he was imprisoned in Yanqing House for two years. The original Yanqing House was ultimately destroyed in a fire in 1947. The KMT military commander of Beiping, Fu Zuoyi, subsequently built a series of small bungalows in this location to house military and political personnel. By the early 2000s, a one-story building with two courtyards existed on the former site of Yanqing House. The building was sometimes referred to as Yanqingzhai (延庆斋).

==== Wan Shan Temple ====
Also known in English as Thousand Benevolence Hall (万善殿; 萬善殿), Wan Shan is a Buddhist Temple located on the eastern bank of the Central Sea. Originally known as Chongzhi Hall, the temple was built by the Qing dynasty's Shunzhi Emperor. Statues of the Buddha line the hall. Behind the temple is Thousand Sage Hall, which includes a dome and a seven-story pagoda.

==== Water Clouds Pavilion ====
Located on an island in the Central Sea, the Water Clouds Pavilion contains a stele engraved by the Qianlong Emperor reading "Autumn Wind on the Taiye Lake".

=== Southern Sea ===
The Southern Sea (Nanhai, 南海) compound is the headquarters of the CCP, including the office of the general secretary and the offices of the staff of the Central Committee General Office. Southern Zhongnanhai also includes the meeting places for the Politburo, Standing Committee and Secretariat. This area is also known as the South District (Chinese: 南区).

==== Huairen Hall ====
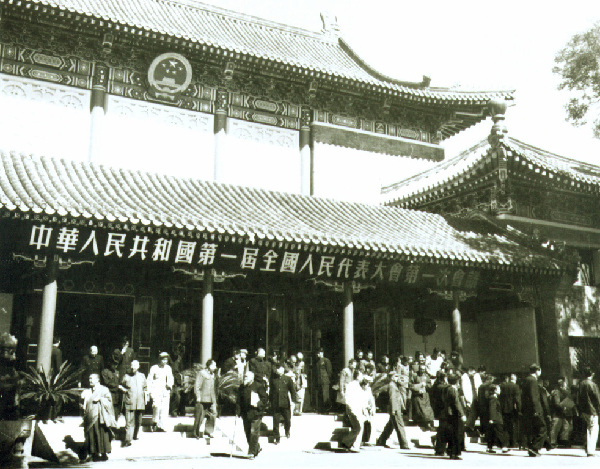
Huairen Hall in 1954

Huairen Hall (怀仁堂; 懷仁堂; 'Hall of Cherished Compassion') is a two-story Chinese-style hall that is used by the CCP as the main meeting place for the Politburo and as an alternate meeting place for the Politburo Standing Committee. The building is also the meeting location of several of the CCP's leading groups such as the Financial and Economic Affairs Leading Group and the Leading Group for Comprehensively Deepening Reforms.

The building served as the daily workplace of Dowager Empress Cixi, the then de facto ruler of China, replacing the Hall of Mental Cultivation in the nearby Forbidden City. After the Boxer rebellion, Huairen Hall became the headquarters of the occupying Eight Nation Alliance's commander Alfred von Waldersee until the building was damaged in a fire. In 1902 Empress Cixi rebuilt Huairen Hall at a cost of five million taels of silver before ultimately dying here in 1908. After the founding of the Republic of China in 1911, President Yuan Shikai used the building to meet with foreign guests and to accept New Year's Day greetings. After Yuan's death, it was the site of his funeral. When Cao Kun became president, he used Huairen Hall as his residence. After the end of the Beiyang Government Huairen Hall had no permanent use and was given to the Beijing City Government.

After the founding of the People's Republic of China, the first plenary session of the Chinese People's Political Consultative Conference (CPPCC) was held in Huairen Hall in September 1949. In order to serve as an audience hall for the CPPCC, an iron sheet roof was built over one of the building's courtyards. In 1952, this roof was replaced with a more permanent two-story auditorium in preparation for the Asia-Pacific Peace Conference. The new meeting hall was then used for first session of the National People's Congress in 1954. Huairen Hall became the auditorium of the central government, often hosting various art shows and political meetings, including Central Committee plenums before the construction of Jingxi Hotel in 1964.

==== Qinzheng Hall ====
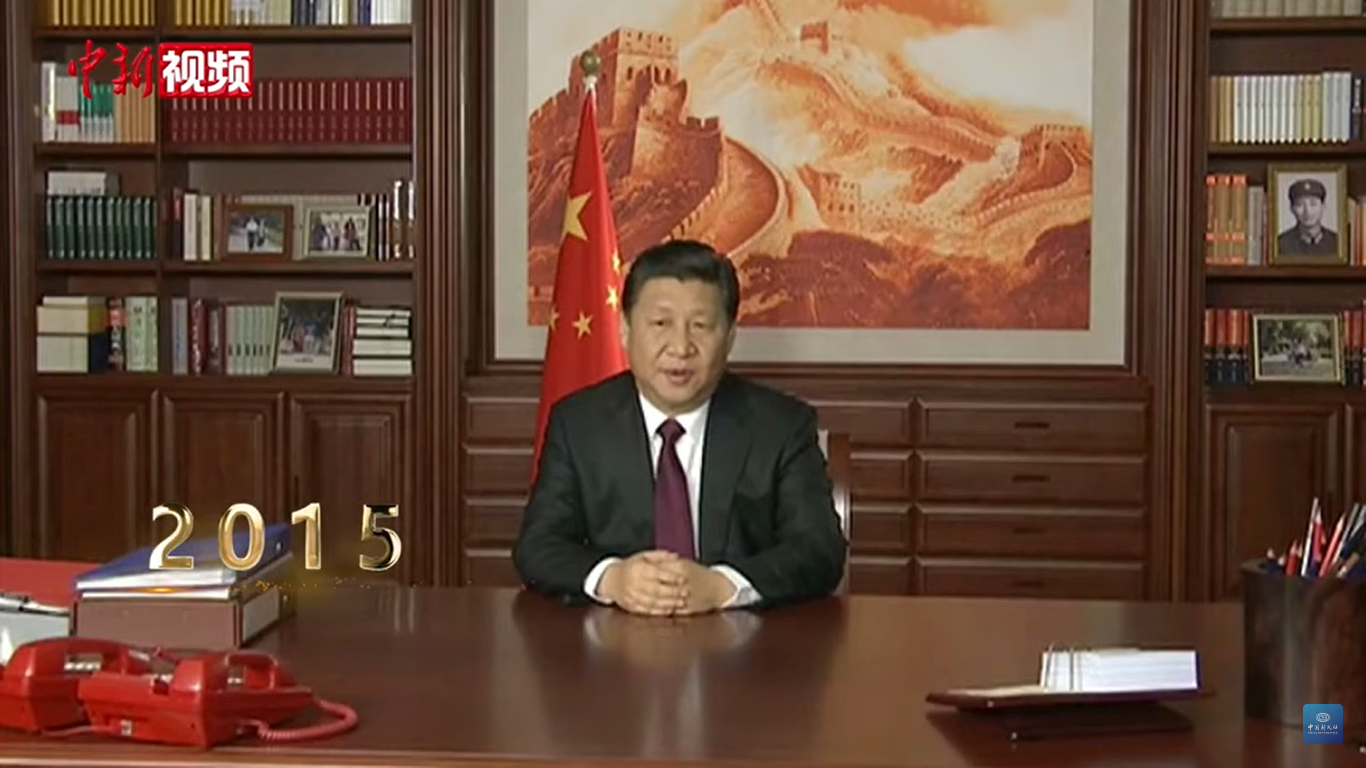
CCP General Secretary Xi Jinping in his office

Qinzheng Hall (勤政殿; Qínzhèng Diàn) is the headquarters of the Secretariat of the Chinese Communist Party and the location of the office of the party's general secretary, a title currently synonymous with the paramount leader of the country. The building also includes a conference room that serves as the main meeting place for the Politburo Standing Committee. The room that the Politburo Standing Committee meets in is referred to as the "small meeting room" and is located along the corridor on the northern side of Qinzheng Hall. The small meeting room is also a meeting place for the secretaries of the CCP Secretariat.

The general secretary's personal office is located behind an office which, in the 1980s, served as workplace of his policy secretary. The office of the policy secretary was occupied by Secretary Bao Tong at the time, and the position and staff associated with it have since been more formalized as the Office of the General Secretary. The policy secretary's office is, in turn, behind another office which served as a workplace for the director of the Central Committee's General Office. It is partially because the head of the General Office has a workplace in front of the office suite of the general secretary that the director's position is referred to as the "Danei Zongguan" (大内总管), roughly translated as "the gatekeeper".

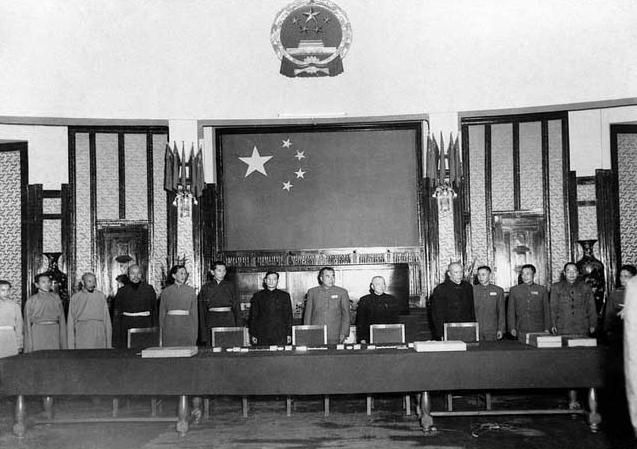
Qinzheng Hall in its pre-1980 configuration during the signing of the Seventeen Point Agreement

In addition to the General Secretary's suite, Qinzheng Hall is also the location of the offices for all of Secretaries of the Secretariat, including the First Secretary of the Secretariat, who has de facto responsibility for the secretariat's day-to-day administration of the party. Each secretarial suite in Qinzheng Hall has a space for receiving guests and a space for working. The General Secretary's suite is comparatively larger and has the most complete facilities in the building, including a sleeping space so that the General Secretary does not need to return to his residence when working for long periods of time. There is an encrypted hotline that runs from Qinzheng Hall to the White House in Washington, D.C. for the purpose of conducting high level talks with American leaders.

The original Qinzheng hall was built by the Kangxi Emperor as the main hall of the Zhongnanhai complex, serving as the Emperor's primary living and working space in Zhongnanhai. After the 1911 revolution, the building served as a venue for government conferences during both the Republic of China and the People's Republic of China. Qinzheng Hall served as the meeting place for the Central People's Government Committee, the interim council that governed China from 1949 until the promulgation of the 1954 Constitution. While serving as the headquarters of the Central People's Government, Qinzheng hall was the site of the 1951 Seventeen Points Agreement which established the terms under which Tibet would come under the sovereignty of the People's Republic of China. In the late 1970s, Wang Dongxing, the director of the Central Committee General Office, demolished Qinzheng hall and spent 6.9 million yuan intended for its reconstruction to build his own private residence. Wang's removal as head of the Central Committee General Office in 1978 prevented him from completing his plan. Ultimately, the rebuilt Qinzheng hall was inaugurated as the Secretariat's new headquarters in March 1980.

==== Benevolence Hall ====
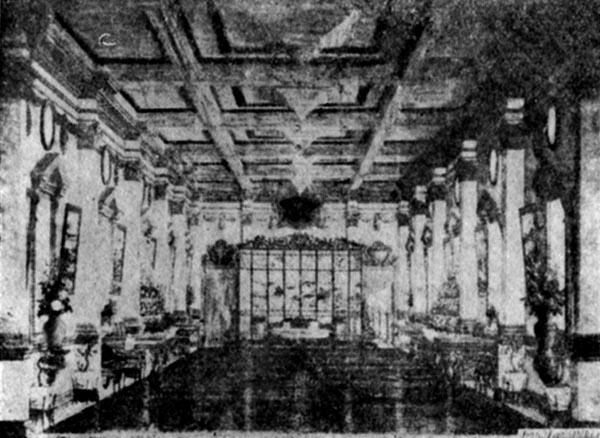
The reception area inside Jurentang

The former Benevolence Hall (居仁堂) was a two-story western-style palace originally known as the Hall of the Calm Sea (Haiyantang) during the Qing dynasty. Dowager Empress Cixi had the building constructed to entertain her female guests, and also to receive foreign diplomats. After the suppression of the Boxer Rebellion, Eight Nation Alliance commander Alfred von Waldersee moved here after Yi Luang Temple was destroyed in a fire. After the founding of the Republic of China, the building was renamed the Hall of Benevolence (Jurentang or Jerenteng), by Yuan Shikai, who continued to use it to host visitors. Benevolence Hall became the headquarters of KMT commander Li Zongren after the defeat and withdrawal of the Japanese Army and later the command of post of General Fu Zuoyi before his surrender to the CCP.

After 1949, the building served as the first headquarters of the Central Military Commission (CMC) before the CMC staff relocated outside of Zhongnanhai. In 1956, the CCP Secretariat became an institution separate from the staff of the party chairman and required its own headquarters. The new general secretary, Deng Xiaoping, chose Benevolence Hall to house the Secretariat. During this period, the building did not undergo any significant maintenance and was finally deemed unsafe and demolished in 1964. The Secretariat offices temporarily moved to "Building C" in the West Building Compound before moving to Qinzheng Hall in 1980. The former location of Benevolence Hall is currently an open park area.

==== Four Blessing Halls ====
The Four Blessing Halls (四福堂), which date from the time of the Qianlong Emperor, line the eastern side of a narrow lane that once formed a western boundary of Zhongnanhai. All four are named according to a consistent theme and are consequently known as Yongfutang (永福堂), Laifutang (來福堂), Zengfutang (增福堂), and Xifutang (錫福堂). After 1949, the buildings were used as residences for several important early party officials, particularly those that did propaganda and ideological work. The PRC's first Defense Minister Peng Dehuai lived at Yongfutang, the building closest to Huairen Hall, until being purged in 1959. In the early days of the PRC, an informal school called the "Zhongnanhai Amateur University" was run out of this location for the benefit of the Central Committee's secretaries and security staff. The school still de facto exists, but in practice has merged with the Beijing Electronic Science and Technology Institute. In 1982, Yongfutang became the headquarters of the administrative office of the Central Advisory Commission (CAC) due to the location's convenient proximity to where CAC Standing Committee meetings were held at Huairen Hall. Laifutang was the location of a commemorative post-funeral ceremony for the late General Secretary Jiang Zemin's cremated remains.

==== West Building Compound ====
The complex of buildings known as West Building Compound (西楼大院) is named for its location in the southwestern corner of Zhongnanhai. The first of these buildings was built by the engineering battalion of the Central Guard Regiment from 1949 to 1951 to house workplaces and apartments for the Central Committee General Office's staff. West Building is one of the workplaces of the Director of the Central Committee General Office, in addition to Qinzheng Hall. One of the original main buildings in this complex was simply called West Building Hall (西楼大厅) while the other buildings in the West Building complex were designated A, B, C, D and F. Buildings C and D were originally intended to be used as accommodations for Provincial Communist Party Committee Secretaries when they were visiting Beijing for meetings. Many of the Mishus or secretarial staff assigned to support the General Office work within the West Building Compound. As late as the 1990s, West Building Compound included a dormitory for the young workers of the Center Committee General Office. The West Building includes a large kitchen and cafeteria for the General Office staff and a smaller eating area that doubles as a conference room for the use of senior leadership. The formal address of West Building Compound is 12 Fuyou Street, Xicheng District, Beijing.

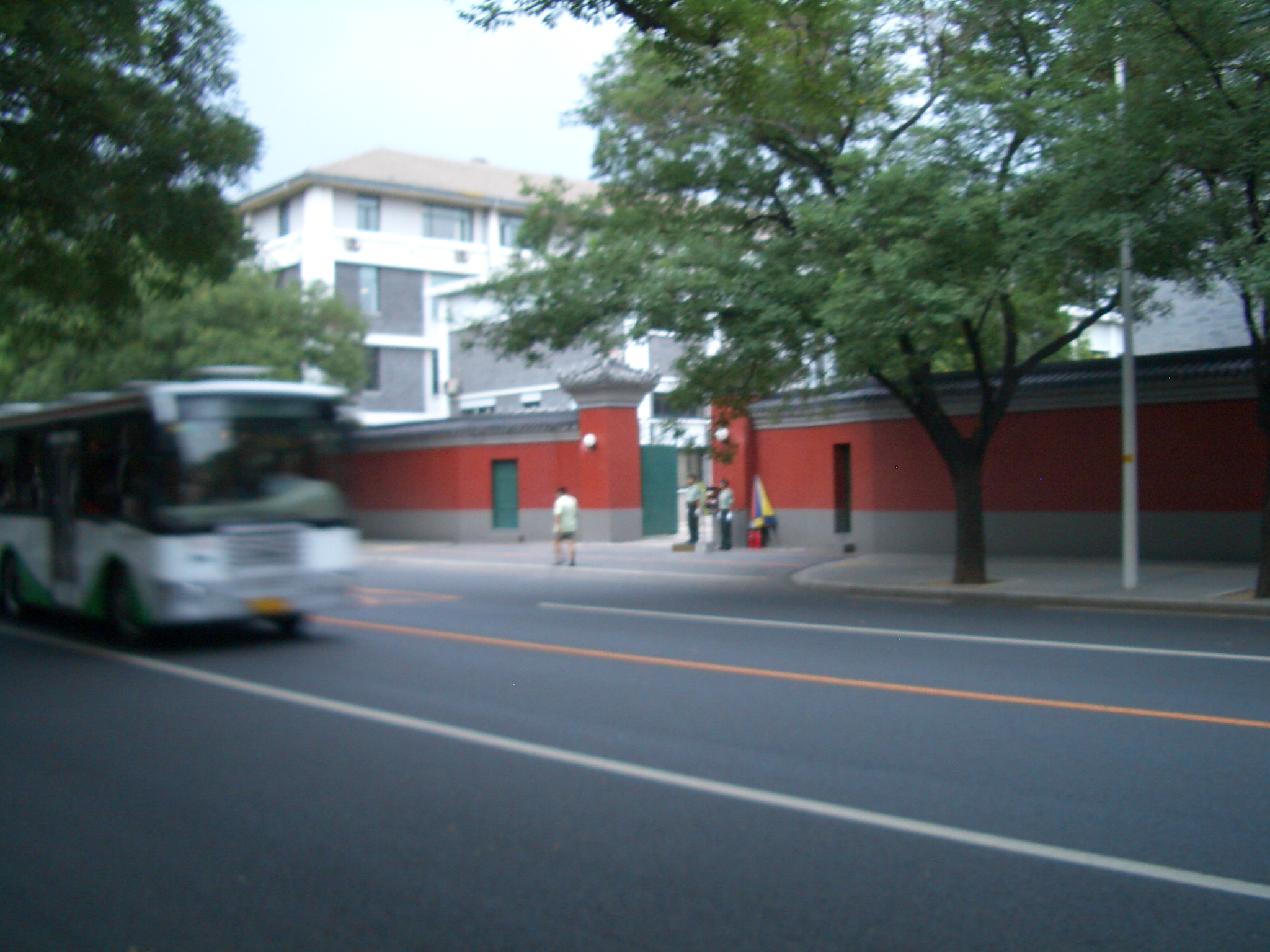
West Building Compound as seen from over the west wall of Zhongnanhai

After West Building was constructed, the complex became the site of the offices of the State Chairman, Premier and all state Vice Chairmen under the Common Program who were also Communist Party members. When the positions of the State Chairman and Chairman of the Communist Party were separated in 1959 and Liu Shaoqi assumed the State Chairmanship, the State Chairman's workplace continued to be located in West Building. Building A was originally intended as the residence and workplace of Mao Zedong, but because he had become used to living in the Chrysanthemum Library, he refused to move into the building. Consequently, Building A became the residence and workplace of state Vice Chairman Liu Shaoqi in 1950. Likewise, Marshal Zhu De's office remained in Building B of the West Building compound when he served as singular state Vice Chairman under the 1954 Constitution. In 1962, President Liu Shaoqi presided over an extraordinary, enlarged meeting of the Politburo Standing Committee in this location, known as the "West Building Meeting". At the meeting, the party leaders discussed in significant detail the dire fiscal and economic situation in the country in the aftermath of the failure of the Great Leap Forward and promised to recover the agricultural sector.

Between 2007 and 2008, part of the original West Building Compound was demolished to make way for a new three-story rectangular building that was completed by 2010. The Central Committee General Office's physical office footprint has now expanded beyond Zhongnanhai to include several buildings on the other side of Fuyou Street from West Building as well as other buildings in the Xicheng District area. The gate on Fuyou Street that Central Committee staff use to travel between buildings inside and outside of the complex is called the "Great West Gate" because it has the highest regular use of Zhongnanhai's gates.

Many of the agencies directly under the supervision of the Central Committee General Office now have their formal headquarters in an annex of buildings spread out on the western side of Fuyou Street adjacent to Zhongnanhai as well as certain locations still within southern Zhongnanhai. The formal addresses of these agencies are as follows:

- Research Office: 8 Fuyou Street, Xicheng District, Beijing
- Secretary Bureau: 1 Boxue Hutong, Xicheng District, Beijing
- Bureau of Regulations: 99 Fuyou Street, Xicheng District, Beijing
- Security Bureau: 81 Nanchang Street, Xicheng District, Beijing (Shuqingyuan Pavilion)
- Confidential Bureau: 7 Dianchang Road, Fengtai District, Beijing
- Confidential Transportation Bureau: 11 Xihuangchenggen North Street, Xicheng District, Beijing
- Special Accounting Office: 14 Fuyou Street, Xicheng District, Beijing
- Supervision and Inspection Office: Unknown location, Beijing
- Personnel Bureau: 12 Fuyou Street, Xicheng District, Beijing (West Building Compound proper)
- Office of the General Secretary: Qinzheng Hall, Xicheng District, Beijing
- Veterans Bureau: 50 Dajue Hutong, Xicheng District, Beijing
- Administration Bureau of Organs directly under the Central Committee: 9 Xihuangchenggen North Street, Xicheng District, Beijing

==== Garden of Abundant Beneficence ====
Some of the buildings within the Garden of Abundant Beneficence (丰泽园; 豐澤園) were built by the Kangxi Emperor of the Qing dynasty who originally used them to raise silkworms. More buildings were later added by the Qianlong Emperor, who used them as libraries and as a personal retreat. Throughout this garden, there are wooden placards at the buildings' entrances, inscribed by the Qianlong Emperor. In the northwestern area of the garden is a building called Chun'ouzhai (春耦斋; 春耦齋) which once housed the seal of the Qianlong Emperor as well as several artworks. After the Boxer Rebellion Chun'ouzhai was looted and it subsequently became a summer residence for the commander of the German contingent of the Eight Nation Alliance Army. In the early days of the People's Republic of China Chun'ouzhai was used as a dance hall, where dances were held twice a week by senior party leaders.

The largest building in the Garden of Abundant Beneficence is Dianxu Hall, which was known as Chong Ya Temple during the Qianlong Emperor's reign, Yinian Temple (頤年堂; 颐年堂) during the Guangxu Emperor's reign and finally as Yitingnian during the Republic of China. During the Beiyang Government (1912–1928) of the Republic of China, the office of the president was initially located in Dianxu Hall. In 1918 President Xu Shichang switched the president's residence and the prime minister's office, relocating his residence to Regent Palace, while the prime minister instead moved to Dianxu Hall in the Garden of Abundant Beneficence. Dianxu Hall became a general purpose meeting area for CCP officials after 1949. During Mao Zedong's time as Paramount Leader, Politburo Meetings were often held in Dianxu Hall due its proximity to Mao's house. Before 1980 the Politburo Standing Committee also met in one of the small conference rooms of Dianxu Hall during the times when meetings were not held in Mao's house.

The Garden of Abundant Beneficence also contains Chairman Mao Zedong's first personal residence and office, which he used from 1949 to 1966, a building called the Library of Chrysanthemum Fragrance (菊香书屋). The Chrysanthemum library is a courtyard-style building with four halls constructed during the time of the Kangxi Emperor to house a collection of books for the imperial family. The north hall of the Chrysanthemum library is called Ziyunxuan (紫云轩) and was the site of Mao's bedroom and personal study. The east hall was the location of Mao's office and the south hall was the location of Jiang Qing's residence for a period of time. An air raid shelter was dug in the courtyard of Chrysanthemum library shortly after Mao moved in, but it was rarely used. Mao relocated to a new building known as the Poolside House in 1966 at the start of the Cultural Revolution. After Mao's death, the Chrysanthemum Library was preserved as a museum which is not accessible to the general public. Immediately to the east of the library are a series of buildings known as the Western Eight Houses (Chinese: 西八所), which served as a dormitory for Mao's personal aides and secretaries.

==== Shuqingyuan Pavilion ====
Located in the northeastern corner of the Southern Sea, the Shuqingyuan Pavilion (淑清院) was built for the Qianlong Emperor as part of a small garden, similar in style to the Beihai Park. After 1959, the original building was destroyed in order to make way for the construction of a barracks and officer staff quarters for Unit 8341, the Zhongnanhai security guard regiment. The formal address of Shuqingyuan Pavilion and the surrounding complex of buildings used by Unit 8341 is 81 Nanchang Street, Xicheng District, Beijing.

==== Building 202 ====
The building (202别墅) next to Huairen Hall was constructed in 1974 as a specially reinforced earthquake shelter. Before the current building was built on this location, the area to the east of Huairen Hall was the site of the homes of Dong Biwu and Chen Boda. Mao Zedong was relocated to Building 202 from Poolside House after the July 1976 Tangshan earthquake. Mao died in this building on September 9, 1976. During the 1989 Tiananmen Square protests and massacre, Premier Li Peng moved into Zhongnanhai and lived in Building 202 due to the perception that he was vulnerable to attack at his residence at Wanshou Road.

==== Western Four Houses ====
The Four Western Houses (西四所) were built as part of the western wing of the Huairen Hall complex as living quarters for eunuchs and palace maids that served Empress Dowager Cixi. They are also known as Qingyuntang (庆云堂). These buildings were acquired by the Peking Institute of Historic Research after the end of the Beiyang government. After 1949, the Propaganda Department was located here before it was eventually moved to its current headquarters on 5 West Chang'an Street. The four buildings were subsequently given the designations "Courtyard No. 1" through "Courtyard No. 4" and became the residences of Li Fuchun, Tan Zhenlin, Deng Xiaoping and Chen Yi respectively. During his paramount leadership, however, Deng Xiaoping did not live in Zhongnanhai, instead living at No. 11 Miliangku Hutong (Rice Grain Depot Hutong) near Di'anmen. Deng moved there in 1977 and lived there until his death. After Chen Yi's death, Zhao Ziyang lived in Courtyard No. 4, the northernmost of the Western Four Houses during his time as General Secretary.

==== Wanzi Gallery ====
The original buildings in the area of Wanzi Gallery (万字廊) were built by the Qianlong Emperor in 1742 to celebrate his mother's 50th birthday.

During his presidency, Liu Shaoqi moved to a building in this area called Fuluju (福禄居) in 1963. After Liu was denounced and purged, both the original Wanzi Gallery and Fuluju were demolished during the Cultural Revolution. Wanzi Gallery was later reconstructed and Mao's wife Jiang Qing lived in what was then called Building No. 201 during the height of the power of the Gang of Four. This building was also known as the Spring Lotus Chamber.

==== Yingtai Island ====
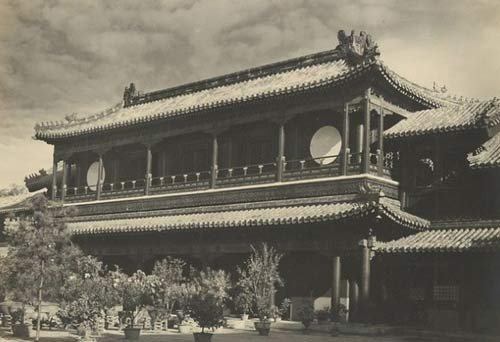
Yingtai Island sometime before 1949

Located in the Southern Sea, the artificial Yingtai Island (瀛台; 瀛臺) was completed in 1421 by Ming Emperor Yongle after he relocated his capital to Beijing. The island was given its current name by Qing Emperor Shunzhi in 1655. Yingtai Island is connected with the shore via a stone bridge. Due to a slope of elevation on the island, the main temple in the north is a single-story building while in the south there exists a two-story pavilion called Penglai Pavilion. There are two temples to the north of Hanyuan Temple, Qingyun Temple to the east and Jingxing Temple to the west. In July 1681, the Kangxi Emperor held the "Yingtai hearings" on the development of a national strategy to put down civil strife. Dowager Empress Cixi imprisoned Emperor Guangxu at Hanyuan Temple on Yingtai in August 1898 after the failure of the Hundred Days Reform. Emperor Guangxu was subsequently poisoned and died here in 1908; Empress Dowager Cixi, Yuan Shikai, and Li Lianying—Cixi's favourite eunuch—were the three main suspects.

Since 1949, Yingtai is used as the site of banquets and other hospitality activities. According to some sources, Jiang Zemin lived in Hanyuan Temple on Yingtai Island during his time as paramount leader.

==== Xinhua Gate ====
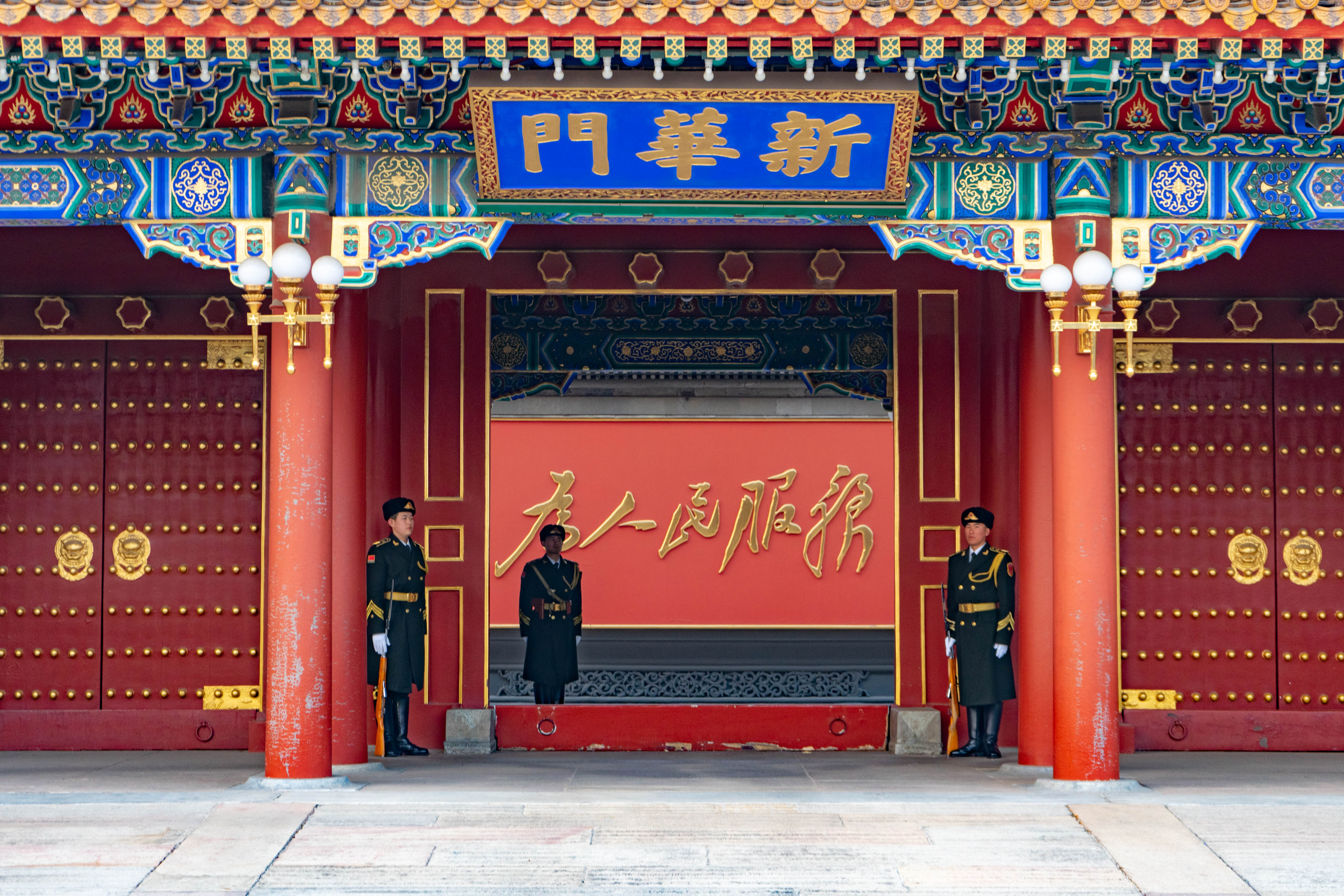
Xinhua Gate entrance displaying the text "Serve the People" (為人民服務) in center

Zhongnanhai's main entrance, the Xinhua Gate is located to the north of West Chang'an Avenue. The gate was originally built by the Qianlong Emperor in 1758 as a pavilion for one of his concubines. After the 1911 Revolution, Yuan Shikai transformed the pavilion into a gate and named it "Xinhua Gate" or "New China Gate" in 1912. The slogans "Long live the great Chinese Communist Party " and "long live invincible Mao Zedong Thought " are now on the walls on both sides of Xinhua Gate. On the door is the inscription "Serve the People" (為人民服務) in Mao Zedong's handwriting. In 1959, an underground passage was built between Xinhua Gate and the Great Hall of the People shortly before the construction of the latter was completed. This passage was intended to be used only by members of the Politburo Standing Committee at the time.

On the night of March 10, 2024, a man attempted to drive a black car through the Xinhua Gate, the main entrance to the Zhongnanhai leadership compound. Security personnel quickly subdued him, and the incident was captured on video by bystanders. Though the footage briefly circulated online, it was swiftly censored. Someone shouted "murderous communists" during the confrontation. Public acts of dissent near the Chinese Communist Party's central seat of power are extremely rare.

== Gallery ==
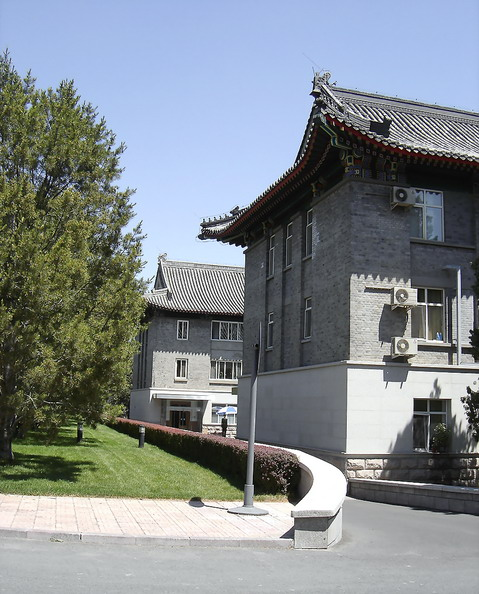
Office buildings in the State Council area of Zhongnanhai

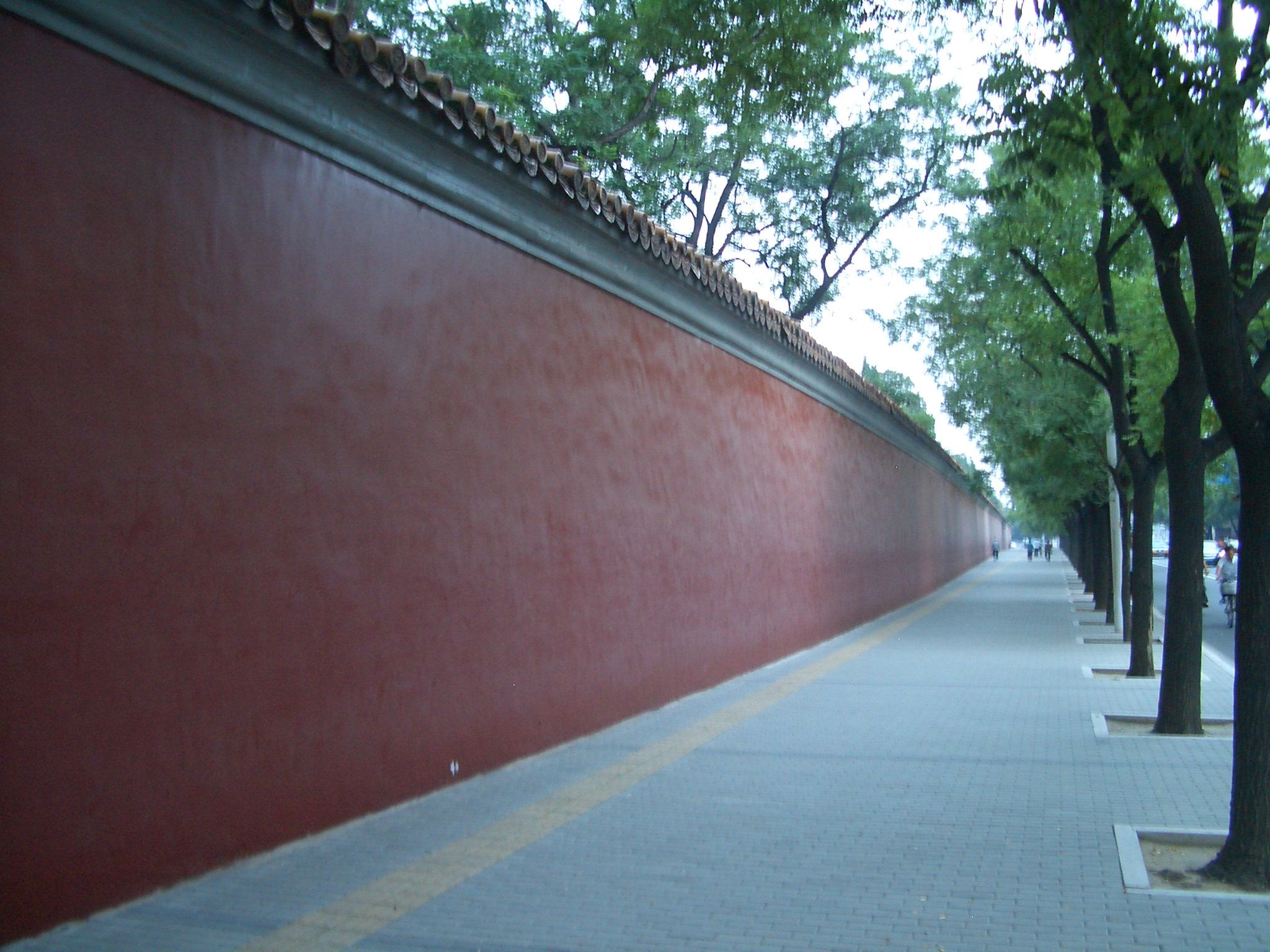
The western wall of the Zhongnanhai compound and Imperial City of Beijing

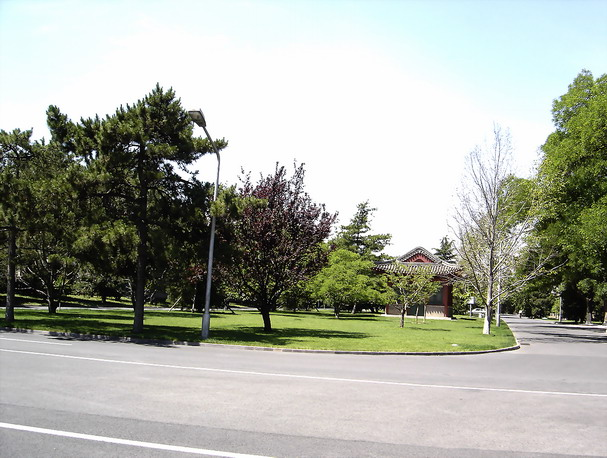
Road inside Zhongnanhai

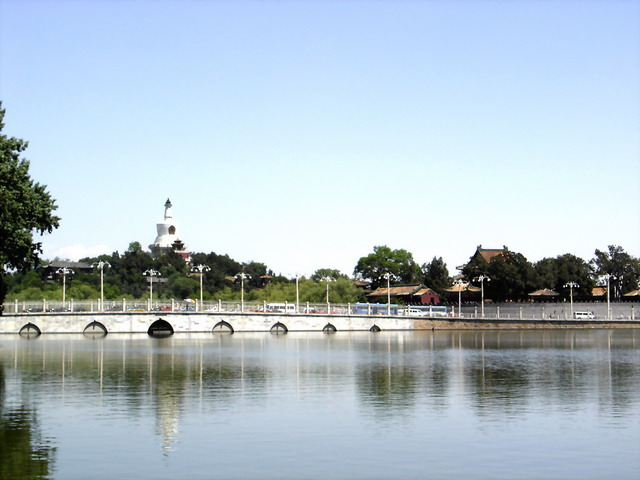
From the central part of Zhongnanhai across the Middle Sea, to the bridge that divides Zhongnanhai from Beihai Park, with the White Stupa of the Beihai Park seen in the distance

== See also ==
- Beidaihe District
- Diaoyutai State Guesthouse
- History of Beijing
- Imperial City, Beijing
- Beihai Park
- Summer Palace
- Old Summer Palace
- Jade Spring Hill
- Presidential Palace, Nanjing
