= Lin Mu =

Chinese politician

Lin Mu (October 18, 1927 – October 15, 2006 Chinese: 林牧), born in Yiwu, Zhejiang, China, was a former Chinese politician. In his later ages, he became a dissident against the CPC.

== Biography ==
Lin was born in Yiwu, Zhejiang, China on October 18, 1927. He go to Department of Electrical Engineering of Northwestern Polytechnical University in 1946. He became a supporter of the CPC in 1948. After the CPC came to power in 1949, Lin became the vise secretary of CPC Shaanxi Provincial Committee.

In 1965, because he supported a reform in Shaanxi led by Hu Yaobang, in the later 12 years, he was persecuted by the CPC during the Cultural Revolution. In 1978, he was redressed. Then he was appointed as a series of positions.

In 1989, for he supported the students protests in Beijing, he was deposed and removed from the CPC. After that, Lin lived in Xian until he died. During the period, Lin published a series of article criticizing the CPC, and thus harassed by the police from time to time. After Zhao Ziyang's death in 2005, he was illegally impounded by the police for some time.

Lin died on October 10, 2006. According to Boxun, his funeral ceremony was harassed by the authorities.
