= Chen Shiju =

Chinese government official

Chen Shiju (Chinese: 陈世炬) was an important political aide for China's former leader Hu Jintao. Chen served as Hu's secretary beginning in Guizhou 1986. Chen was the director of the Office of the General Secretary of the Chinese Communist Party under Hu Jintao from 2002 to 2012. Chen concurrently served as deputy director of the General Office of the Chinese Communist Party. In 2015, he held a concurrent post on deputy director of the Central Guidance Commission on Building Spiritual Civilization.
