= 20th Politburo Standing Committee of the Chinese Communist Party =

The 20th Politburo Standing Committee of the Chinese Communist Party, formally the Standing Committee of the Political Bureau of the 20th Central Committee of the Communist Party of China, was elected by the 1st plenary session of the 20th Central Committee on 23 October 2022, in the aftermath of the 20th National Congress of the Chinese Communist Party (CCP). It was preceded by the 19th Politburo Standing Committee.

== Meetings ==
Disclosed meetings of the 20th Politburo Standing Committee
Date	Length	Type	Ref.
10 November 2022	1 day	Ordinary meeting	
16 February 2023	1 day	Ordinary meeting	
17 August 2023	1 day	Ordinary meeting	
4 January 2024	1 day	Ordinary meeting	
25 July 2024	1 day	Ordinary meeting	
9 January 2025	1 day	Ordinary meeting	
9 January 2025	1 day	Ordinary meeting	
8 January 2026	1 day	Ordinary meeting	

== Composition ==
Members of the Standing Committee of the Political Bureau of the 20th Central Committee of the Chinese Communist Party
R.	Officeholder		19th	Birth	PM	Birthplace	Academic feats	Positions	Ref.
1	Xi Jinping	Xi Jinping 习近平	Old	1953	1974	Beijing	Graduate: Doctoral degree in Marxist legal studies; Undergraduate degree in chemical engineering	Twelve: Party offices; General Secretary, Central Committee; Chairman, National Security Commission of the Central Committee; Chairman, Central Comprehensively Deepening Reforms Commission of the Central Committee; Head, Central Comprehensively Law-Based Governance Commission; Head, Central Financial and Economic Affairs Commission; Head, Central Foreign Affairs Commission; Head, Central Auditing Committee; Head, Central Leading Group for Taiwan Affairs of the Central Committee; Military offices; Chairman, Central Military Commission; Commander-in-chief, Joint Operations Command Center of the Central Military Commission of the People's Liberation Army; Head, Leading Group for National Defence and Military Reform of the Central Military Commission; State offices; President of the People's Republic of China	
2	Li Qiang	Li Qiang 李强	New	1959	1983	Zhejiang	Graduate: Master's degree in business administration; Graduate programme in world economics; Graduate programme in engineering management; Undergraduate degree in agricultural mechanisation	Fifteen: Party offices; Director, Central Financial Commission; Director, Central Institutional Organisation Commission; Deputy Chairman, National Security Commission of the Central Committee; Deputy Chairman, Central Comprehensively Deepening Reforms Commission; Deputy Head, Central Comprehensively Law-Based Governance Commission; Deputy Director, Central Financial and Economic Affairs Commission; Deputy Director, Central Foreign Affairs Commission; Deputy Director, Central Cyberspace Affairs Commission; Deputy Head, Central Integrated Military-Civilian Development Committee; Deputy Head, Central Auditing Committee; Leader, Central Leading Group for Climate Change and Emissions Reduction; Leader, State Council Leading Party Members Group; State offices; Premier, State Council of China; Director, National Defense Mobilization Commission; Director, National Energy Commission	
3	Zhao Leji	Zhao Leji 赵乐际	Old	1957	1975	Qinghai	Graduate: Graduate programme in currency and banking; Undergraduate degree in philosophy	Four: Party offices; Leader, Standing Committee of the National People's Congress Party Group; Deputy Chairman, National Security Commission of the Central Committee; Deputy Head, Central Comprehensively Law-Based Governance Commission; State office; Chairman, Standing Committee of the National People's Congress	
4	Wang Huning	Wang Huning 王沪宁	Old	1955	1984	Shanghai	Graduate: Master's degree in Marxist legal studies; Graduate programme in international politics; Undergraduate degree in French	Eight: Organisational office; Chairman, National Committee of the Chinese People's Political Consultative Conference; Chairman, China Council for the Promotion of Peaceful National Reunification; Party office; Leader, Chinese People's Political Consultative Conference Party Group; Head, Central Coordination Group for Tibet Affairs; Head, Central Coordination Group for Xinjiang Affairs; Director, Office of the Central Comprehensively Deepening Reforms Commission; Deputy Director, Central Comprehensively Deepening Reforms Commission; Deputy Head, Central Leading Group for Taiwan Affairs	
5	Cai Qi	Cai Qi 蔡奇	New	1955	1975	Fujian	Graduate: Doctoral degree in political economy; Post-graduate degree in economic law; Undergraduate degree in political education	Fifteen: Party offices; First-ranked secretary, Secretariat of the Central Committee; Director, General Office of the Central Committee; Director, Office of the General Secretary of the Central Committee; Head, Central Cyberspace Affairs Commission; Chairman, Central Guidance Commission on Building Spiritual Civilization; Leader, Central Leading Group for Propaganda, Ideology and Culture of the Central Committee; Leader, Central Leading Group for Party Building of the Central Committee; Director, Capital Planning and Construction Commission; Director, Party and State Merit and Honor Commendation Working Committee; Director, Central Leading Group for Studying and Implementing "Xi Jinping Thought" Theme Education; Deputy Chairman, National Security Commission of the Central Committee; Deputy Director, Central Comprehensively Deepening Reforms Commission; Deputy Director, Central Institutional Organisation Commission; Deputy Director, Central Cyberspace Affairs Commission; Deputy Head, Central Integrated Military-Civilian Development Committee	
6	Ding Xuexiang	Ding Xuexiang 丁薛祥	New	1962	1984	Jiangsu	Graduate: Master's degree in science and management; Bachelor's degree in engineering	Thirteen: Party offices; Deputy Leader, State Council Leading Party Members Group; Leader, Central Leading Group on Hong Kong and Macau Affairs; Head, Air Traffic Control Committee; Deputy Head, Central Integrated Military-Civilian Development Committee; Director, Office of the Central Integrated Military-Civilian Development Committee; State offices; First-Ranked Vice Premier of the State Council; Head, Food Safety Committee; Head, National Greening Committee; Head, Central Leading Group for Belt and Road Initiative Construction; Head, Central Leading Group for the Development of the Guangdong-Hong Kong-Macao Greater Bay Area; Head, Central Leading Group for the 3rd Geography Conditions Survey; Head, Coordination Group for Promoting Transformation of Government Functions and "Delegation, Regulation, Service" Reform; Deputy Director, National Energy Commission	
7	Li Xi	Li Xi 李希	New	1956	1982	Gansu	Graduate: Master's degree in economics and management; Undergraduate degree in literature	Four: Party offices; Secretary, Standing Committee of the Central Commission for Discipline Inspection; Director, Central Leading Group for Inspection Work; Director, Central Leading Group for Deepening the Pilot Work on Reform of the National Supervision System; Deputy Head, Central Auditing Committee	

== See also ==
- Politburo Standing Committee of the Chinese Communist Party
- Politburo of the Chinese Communist Party
- General secretaryship of Xi Jinping
