= Succession of power in China =

The succession of power in China since 1949 takes place in the context of a one-party state under the Chinese Communist Party (CCP). Despite the guarantee of universal franchise in the constitution, the appointment of the General Secretary of the Chinese Communist Party (paramount leader) lies largely in the hands of his predecessor and the powerful factions that control the Central Committee of the CCP.

The appointment of the top leader occurred after two five year terms in accordance with the Constitution of China from 1982 to 2018. This was changed to unlimited terms during the first plenary session of the 13th National People's Congress in March 2018.

In October 2022, Xi Jinping was re-elected as General Secretary of the Chinese Communist Party for a precedent-breaking third term of paramount leader after Mao Zedong's death.

== Structure of power ==
The de facto leader of China holds these three official titles since 1993:

General Secretary of the Chinese Communist Party
Head of the ruling party and the top ranking official
President of the People's Republic of China
Nominal state representative for foreign affairs
Chairman of the Central Military Commission
Commander-in-chief of the Armed Forces (People's Armed Forces)

In the past it was possible for the Paramount leader to wield absolute power without holding any of the highest offices. This was the case with Deng Xiaoping who was the undisputed leader from 1978 to 1989 without holding any of the highest offices of party and state. Since his retirement, power has become more structured with the leader holding all three of the previously mentioned offices.

== History ==
The concept of Paramount leader was instituted during the era of Mao Zedong who was Chairman of the Chinese Communist Party for life. The position was further established under Deng Xiaoping, however the term Paramount leader has not been officially attributed to any other leaders. Since the retirement of Deng Xiaoping by resigning from Chairman of the Central Military Commission of the Communist Party in 1989, political power in China has been held collectively by the members of the Politburo Standing Committee of the Chinese Communist Party. The CCP General Secretary may be best described as primus inter pares, first among equals. Because the proceedings of this body are considered a state secret, the inner workings of Politburo are not made public. It is clear, however, that decision making has become consensus driven and that no single figure can any longer act unilaterally as in the days of Mao Zedong and Deng Xiaoping.

== Constitutional mechanism ==
Constitutional power in the People's Republic of China is held by the Central Committee of the Chinese Communist Party (CCCPC). Although this group of approximately 300 members does not have power in the same way as a traditional legislative body, the most important and senior officials of the Chinese government are all members.

Within the CCCPC is the Politburo of the Chinese Communist Party. This body is a group of 25 individuals. Theoretically, the Politburo is elected by the CCCPC; however, in practice any new member of the Politburo is chosen by the current members. Politburo members hold positions in China's national government and regional positions of power simultaneously thereby consolidating the CCP's power.

In the case of key policy decisions, topics are addressed in the Politburo which then determines actions to be taken by the national and local government. The policy direction for the entire country rests in the hands of these 25 individuals who meet together once a month. Admission into the Politburo is extremely difficult. Tight control over the body is exercised by current members who vet potential members carefully to maintain the balance of power. Good political relationships within the Politburo are essential for admittance into the group. All members of the Politburo are elected for five year terms.

Members of the Political Bureau of the 20th Central Committee of the Chinese Communist Party
Name	Hanzi	19th POL	Birth	PM	Birthplace	Education	No. of offices	Ref.
Cai Qi	蔡奇	Old	1955	1975	Fujian	Graduate	Three: Party offices; First Secretary, Secretariat of the Central Committee; Director, General Office of the Central Committee; Director, Office of the General Secretary of the Central Committee	
Chen Jining	陈吉宁	New	1964	1984	Liaoning	Graduate	One: Party office; Secretary, Shanghai Municipal Party Committee	
Chen Min'er	陈敏尔	Old	1960	1982	Zhejiang	Graduate	One: Party office; Secretary, Tianjin Municipal Party Committee	
Chen Wenqing	陈文清	New	1960	1983	Sichuan	Graduate	One: Party office; Secretary, Central Political and Legal Affairs Commission	
Ding Xuexiang	丁薛祥	Old	1962	1984	Jiangsu	Graduate	One: State office; First-Ranked Vice Premier of the State Council	
He Lifeng	何立峰	New	1955	1981	Guangdong	Graduate	Two: Party office; Director, Office of the Central Financial and Economic Affairs Commission; State office; Second-Ranked Vice Premier of the State Council	
He Weidong	何卫东	New	1957	1978	Fujian	Undergraduate	Two: Party office; Second Vice Chairman, Central Military Commission; State office; Second Vice Chairman, Central Military Commission	
Huang Kunming	黄坤明	Old	1956	1976	Fujian	Graduate	One: Party office; Secretary, Guangdong Provincial Party Committee	
Li Ganjie	李干杰	New	1964	1984	Hunan	Graduate	One: Party office; Head, Organization Department of the Central Committee	
Li Hongzhong	李鸿忠	Old	1956	1976	Shenyang	Graduate	One: State office; First Vice Chairman, Standing Committee of the National People's Congress	
Li Qiang	李强	Old	1959	1983	Zhejiang	Graduate	Eight: Party offices; Director, Central Institutional Organisation Commission; Deputy Director, Central Comprehensively Deepening Reforms Commission; Deputy Director, Central Financial and Economic Affairs Commission; Deputy Director, Central Cyberspace Affairs Commission; Deputy Director, Central Foreign Affairs Commission; Leader, Central Leading Group for Climate Change and Emissions Reduction; Leader, State Council Leading Party Members Group; State offices; Premier, State Council of China	
Li Shulei	李书磊	New	1964	1986	Henan	Graduate	One: Party office; Head, Publicity Department of the Central Committee	
Li Xi	李希	Old	1956	1982	Gansu	Graduate	Two: Party office; Secretary, Standing Committee of the Central Commission for Discipline Inspection; Director, Central Leading Group for Inspection Work	
Liu Guozhong	刘国中	New	1962	1986	Heilongjiang	Graduate	One: State office; Fourth-Ranked Vice Premier of the State Council	
Ma Xingrui	马兴瑞	New	1959	1988	Heilongjiang	Graduate	One: Party office; Secretary, Xinjiang Provincial Party Committee	
Shi Taifeng	石泰峰	New	1956	1982	Shanxi	Graduate	Two: Party office; Head, United Front Work Department of the Central Committee; Organisational office; Vice Chairman, National Committee of the Chinese People's Political Consultative Conference	
Wang Huning	王沪宁	Old	1955	1984	Shanghai	Graduate	One: Organisational office; Chairman, National Committee of the Chinese People's Political Consultative Conference	
Wang Yi	王毅	New	1953	1981	Beijing	Graduate	Two: Party office; Director, Office of the Central Foreign Affairs Commission; State office; Minister of Foreign Affairs, China	
Xi Jinping	习近平	Old	1953	1974	Beijing	Graduate	Eleven: Party offices; General Secretary, Central Committee; Chairman, National Security Commission of the Central Committee; Chairman, Central Comprehensively Deepening Reforms Commission of the Central Committee; Head, Central Leading Group for Taiwan Affairs of the Central Committee; Head, Central Leading Group for Financial and Economic Work of the Central Committee; Head, Central Leading Group for Network Security and Information Technology of the Central Committee; Military offices; Chairman, Central Military Commission; Commander-in-chief, Joint Operations Command Center of the Central Military Commission of the People's Liberation Army; Head, Leading Group for National Defence and Military Reform of the Central Military Commission; Head, Office of the Central Integrated Military-Civilian Development Committee; State offices; President of China	
Yin Li	尹力	New	1962	1980	Shandong	Graduate	One: Party office; Secretary, Beijing City Party Committee	
Yuan Jiajun	袁家军	New	1962	1992	Jilin	Graduate	One: Party office; Secretary, Chongqing Municipal Party Committee	
Zhang Guoqing	张国清	New	1964	1984	Henan	Graduate	One: State office; Third-Ranked Vice Premier of the State Council	
Zhang Youxia	张又侠	Old	1950	1969	Beijing	Graduate	Two: Party office; First Vice Chairman, Central Military Commission; State office; First Vice Chairman, Central Military Commission	
Zhao Leji	赵乐际	Old	1957	1975	Shandong	Graduate	One: State office; Chairman, Standing Committee of the National People's Congress	

Power within the Politburo is further concentrated in the Politburo Standing Committee of the Chinese Communist Party. This group of seven members meets together weekly and is led by the General Secretary.

Members of the Standing Committee of the Political Bureau of the 20th Central Committee of the Chinese Communist Party
Rank	Portrait	Name	Hanzi	19th PSC	Birth	PM	Birthplace	Academic attainment	No. of offices	Ref.
1	Xi Jinping	Xi Jinping	习近平	Old	1953	1974	Beijing	Graduate: Doctoral degree in Marxist legal studies; Undergraduate degree in chemical engineering	Eleven: Party offices; General Secretary, Central Committee; Chairman, National Security Commission of the Central Committee; Chairman, Central Comprehensively Deepening Reforms Commission of the Central Committee; Head, Central Leading Group for Taiwan Affairs of the Central Committee; Head, Central Leading Group for Financial and Economic Work of the Central Committee; Head, Central Leading Group for Network Security and Information Technology of the Central Committee; Military offices; Chairman, Central Military Commission; Commander-in-chief, Joint Operations Command Center of the Central Military Commission of the People's Liberation Army; Head, Leading Group for National Defence and Military Reform of the Central Military Commission; Head, Office of the Central Integrated Military-Civilian Development Committee; State offices; President of China	
2	Li Qiang	Li Qiang	李强	New	1959	1983	Zhejiang	Graduate: Master's degree in business administration; Graduate programme in world economics; Graduate programme in engineering management; Undergraduate degree in agricultural mechanisation	Eight: Party offices; Director, Central Institutional Organisation Commission; Deputy director, Central Comprehensively Deepening Reforms Commission; Deputy director, Central Financial and Economic Affairs Commission; Deputy director, Central Cyberspace Affairs Commission; Deputy director, Central Foreign Affairs Commission; Leader, Central Leading Group for Climate Change and Emissions Reduction; Leader, State Council Leading Party Members Group; State offices; Premier, State Council of China	
3	Zhao Leji	Zhao Leji	赵乐际	Old	1957	1975	Qinghai	Graduate: Graduate programme in currency and banking; Undergraduate degree in philosophy	One: State office; Chairman, Standing Committee of the National People's Congress	
4	Wang Huning	Wang Huning	王沪宁	Old	1955	1984	Shanghai	Graduate: Master's degree in Marxist legal studies; Graduate programme in international politics; Undergraduate degree in French	One: Organisational office; Chairman, National Committee of the Chinese People's Political Consultative Conference	
5	Cai Qi	Cai Qi	蔡奇	New	1955	1975	Fujian	Graduate: Doctoral degree in political economy; Post-graduate degree in economic law; Undergraduate degree in political education	Three: Party offices; First Secretary, Secretariat of the Central Committee; Director, General Office of the Central Committee; Director, Office of the General Secretary of the Central Committee	
6	Ding Xuexiang	Ding Xuexiang	丁薛祥	New	1962	1984	Jiangsu	Graduate: Master's degree in science and management; Bachelor's degree in engineering	One: State offices; First-Ranked Vice Premier of the State Council	
7	Li Xi	Li Xi	李希	New	1956	1982	Gansu	Graduate: Master's degree in economics and management; Undergraduate degree in literature	Two: Party offices; Secretary, Standing Committee of the Central Commission for Discipline Inspection; Director, Central Leading Group for Inspection Work	

Executive leadership in the PRC is elected through a process that can best be described as an indirect election. In this system, only one candidate stands for the election of any given position. Although other candidates cannot run formally, write-in candidates are permitted. In 2013, when the 12th National People's Congress elected CCP general secretary Xi Jinping as president, 2952 members voted in favour and one against, with three abstentions. Similarly, in the 2008 election, Hu Jintao, then-General Secretary, President and Chairman of the Central Military Commission, were re-elected by a landslide. Of the 2985 members of the 11th National People's Congress, only 3 voted against Hu Jintao, with another 5 abstaining.

== Practical mechanism ==
In practical terms, the National People's Congress provides a rubber stamp on a decision that is made by the Politburo and the Standing Committee. The transition of leadership can take several months. For instance, when Hu Jintao took over power from Jiang Zemin, the transition of power stretched out almost two years. Listed below are the dates on which Hu was appointed to each office:

- General Secretary of the Chinese Communist Party (November 2002)
- President of the People's Republic of China (March 2003)
- Chairman of the Central Military Commission (September 2004)

Usually the office of Chairman of the Central Military Commission is the last office handed over by the previous leader, in order to secure political influence and ensure political continuity.

== Most recent transition ==
Appointments to key offices are the best predictor of whom the next leader will be. The office of Vice Chairman of the Central Military Commission (CMC) is seen by many as the last stop before becoming the top leader of China. Appointment to Vice Chairman position is so crucial that when Xi Jinping, the current CCP General Secretary, failed to achieve that office at the 4th Plenum in 2009, many analysts suggested that he had fallen from favor and would not be the next Chinese leader. His ultimate appointment to Vice Chairman of the CMC was seen as evidence that he had begun to consolidate his power and would ultimately succeed Hu Jintao when his term expired in 2012 at the 18th Party Congress.

Absent a transparent electoral process, the appointment to key positions is the only way to predict future leadership in China. Note in the table below, the path that Xi Jinping followed from a low-level party official at the age of 30 to the leader of China.

Xi Jinping's Corresponding Political and Military Postings, 1983–2007

Years	Political Position	Military Position
1983-85	First secretary, Zhengding County, Hebei Province party committee	First political commissar and first secretary of the Party committee of People's Armed Forces Department of Zhengding County, Hebei Province
1988-90	Secretary of the CCP Ningde Prefectural Committee, Fujian Province	First secretary of the Party committee of Ningde Sub-Military Area Command
1990-93	Secretary of the CCP Fuzhou Municipal Committee and chairman of the Standing Committee of the Fuzhou Municipal People's Congress	First secretary of the Party committee of Fuzhou Sub-Military Area Command
1995-96	Deputy secretary of the CCP Fujian Provincial Committee, secretary of the CCP Fuzhou Municipal Committee and chairman of the Standing Committee of the Fuzhou Municipal People's Congress	First secretary of the Party committee of Fuzhou Sub-Military Area Command
1996-99	Deputy secretary of the CCP Fujian Provincial Committee	First political commissar of the anti-aircraft artillery reserve division of Fujian Provincial Military Area Command
1999-2000	Deputy secretary of the CCP Fujian Provincial Committee and acting governor of Fujian Province	Vice director of commission for national defense mobilization of Nanjing Military Area Command, director of Fujian provincial commission for national defense mobilization, first political commissar of antiaircraft artillery reserve division of Fujian Provincial Military Area Command
2000-02	Deputy secretary of the CCP Fujian Provincial Committee and governor of Fujian Province	Vice director of commission for national defense mobilization of Nanjing Military Area Command, director of Fujian provincial commission for national defense mobilization, first political commissar of antiaircraft artillery reserve division of Fujian Provincial Military Area Command
2002	Deputy secretary of the CCP Zhejiang Provincial Committee and acting governor of Zhejiang Province	Vice director of commission for national defense mobilization of Nanjing Military Area Command, director of Zhejiang provincial commission for national defense mobilization
2002-03	Secretary of the CCP Zhejiang Provincial Committee and acting governor of Zhejiang Province	First secretary of the Party committee of Zhejiang Provincial Military Area Command, vice director of commission for national defense mobilization of Nanjing Military Area Command, director of Zhejiang provincial commission for national defense mobilization
2003-07	Secretary of the CCP Zhejiang Provincial Committee and chairman of the Standing Committee of the Zhejiang Provincial People's Congress	First secretary of the Party committee of Zhejiang Provincial Military Area Command
2007	Secretary of the CCP Shanghai Municipal Committee	First secretary of the Party committee of Shanghai Garrison

As long as the Chinese government remains secretive about the inner workings of the CCP Politburo, past behavior will continue to be the most effective tool for predicting future appointments. In this context, the appointment of a candidate to key offices is still the best indicator of their future role. For example, the appointment of Xi Jinping as the vice chairman of the Central Military Commission of the Chinese Communist Party signposted with a reasonable amount of confidence that he would be the next top leader of the People's Republic of China.

=== Xi Jinping era ===
The sixth generation of leaders had been expected to come to power at the 20th Party Congress in 2022. However, following Xi Jinping's consolidation of power at the 19th Party Congress, the future of the "sixth generation" was cast into doubt as clear successor figures failed to be named to senior leadership posts, particularly the Politburo Standing Committee. Xi Jinping was re-elected as the General Secretary of the Chinese Communist Party in 2022.

In preceding years, Hu Chunhua (a Vice-Premier from 2018 to 2023) was seen as a possible core figure. Hu and Sun Zhengcai were the only Politburo members named at the 18th Party Congress in 2012 who were born after 1960, making their further advancement seem like a certainty, but Sun was purged before the 19th Party Congress and Hu was dropped from the Politburo at the 20th. U.S.-based newspaper Duo Wei Times also listed four figures who have since fallen from grace, former Fujian Governor Su Shulin, former President of the Supreme People's Court Zhou Qiang, former Heilongjiang Party Secretary Zhang Qingwei, and former Minister of Natural Resources Lu Hao, as other potential figures in this generation of leadership. Others in this rough age group ascending in the ranks include Zhang Guoqing (now a Vice-Premier) and Chen Min'er (party secretary of Chongqing and then Tianjin).

Ding Xuexiang is the only person from this age bracket to have reached the Standing Committee, but the 20th Politburo includes eight other members born between 1960 and 1964.

Others are Yin Hong, Shen Xiaoming, Lu Hao, Chen Gang, Zhou Zuyi, Zhao Long, Zhao Gang, Zhao Yide, Huang Jianfa and since May 2026 Ding Xiangqun as the first female party secretary of the National Financial Regulatory Administration。

Xi Jinping has not named his successor as paramount leader of the CCP which broke from the precedent previously established of naming the successor at the start of the second term of the paramount leader. This is seen as an attempt by Xi to further consolidate power as the leader of China and maintain a strong hold on his position of power. Xi's lack of a named successor reversed the previously perceived notion of intraparty democracy in the naming system of leadership succession in the CCP.

== See also ==
- List of Chinese leaders
- Paramount leader
- Orders of precedence in China
- Chairman of the Chinese Communist Party
- General Secretary of the Chinese Communist Party
- List of state representatives of the People's Republic of China
- List of premiers of the Republic of China
