= 18th Politburo of the Chinese Communist Party =

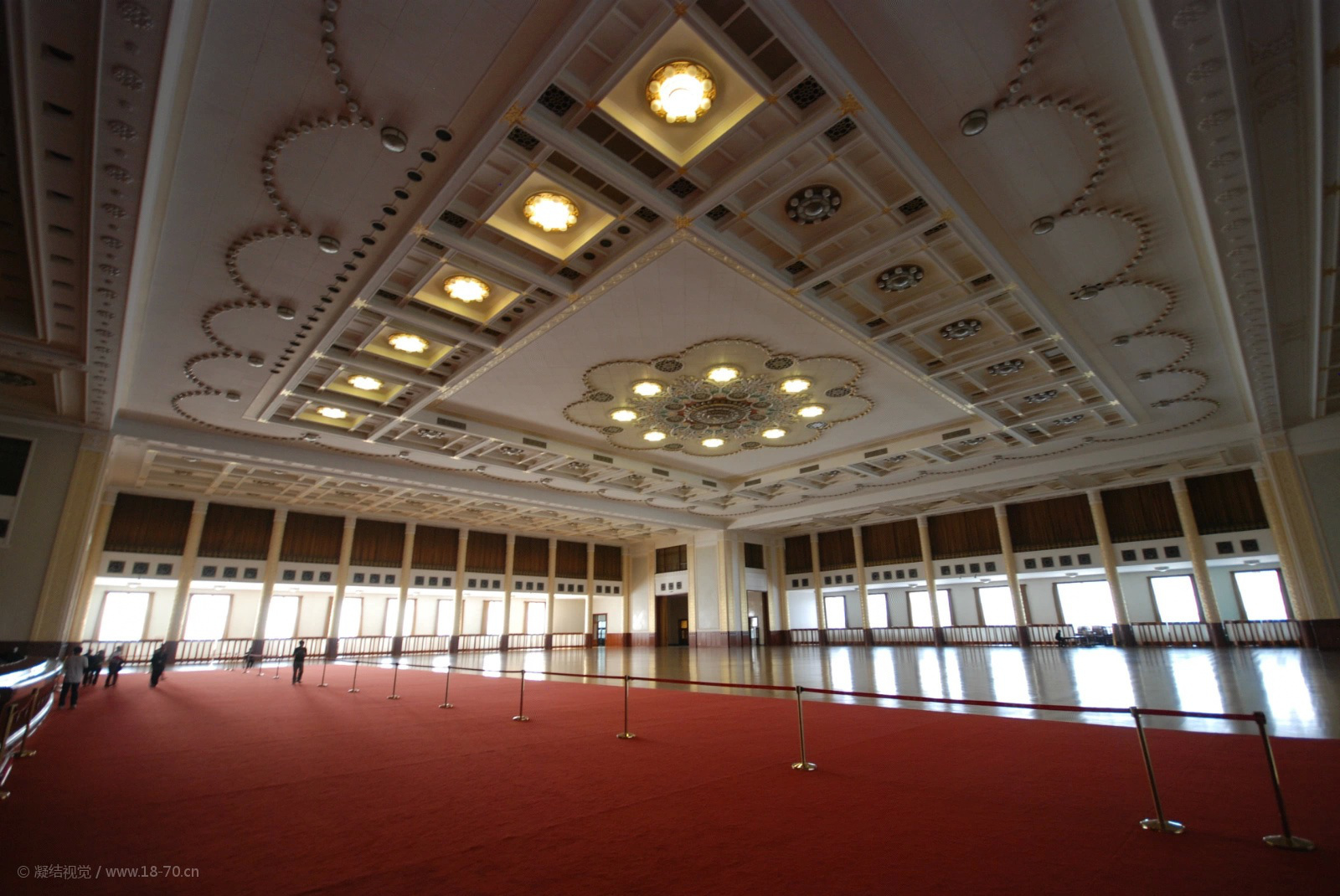
Banquet Hall, Great Hall of the People, Central Government of the People's Republic of China

The 18th Politburo of the Chinese Communist Party (CCP), formally the Political Bureau of the 18th Central Committee of the Communist Party of China, was elected at the 1st plenary session of the 18th Central Committee of the CCP on 15 November 2012 in the aftermath of the 18th National Congress. This electoral term was preceded by the 17th Politburo and succeeded by the 19th. Of the 25 members, seven served in the 18th Politburo Standing Committee.

At the beginning of its term, the 25 Politburo members held the following portfolios: seven members of the CCP Politburo Standing Committee, six regional party leaders, two military figures, five leaders of central party organs and commissions, three Vice Premiers, the Vice President, and the head of the national trade union federation. The internal composition was similar to the previous Politburo, with only a few portfolio changes. The number of Standing Committee members decreased from nine to seven. The party leaders of the direct-controlled municipalities of Beijing, Shanghai, Tianjin, and Chongqing, the province of Guangdong, and the far western region of Xinjiang were represented on the Politburo; this arrangement was unchanged from the previous Politburo. The two vice-chairmen of the Central Military Commission, the national trade union head, the head of the party's Organization and Propaganda departments, and all Vice-Premiers were represented on the Politburo; again this arrangement was totally consistent with the composition of the previous Politburo.

The long-term head of the Policy Research Office, Wang Huning, gained a seat on the Politburo. This was the first time the head of this office was represented at the Politburo level. Before starting his Politburo term, Wang sat on the Central Secretariat. Similarly, Li Zhanshu was appointed director of the party's General Office and was given a seat on the Politburo, while his predecessors generally did not enjoy this 'privilege'. The Secretary of the Central Political and Legal Affairs Commission, Meng Jianzhu, did not earn a seat on the Standing Committee, unlike his predecessor Zhou Yongkang. Moreover, no Politburo member directly took on the role that Li Changchun played as "propaganda chief" in the previous Politburo; instead, Standing Committee member Liu Yunshan was named both executive Secretary of the Secretariat in charge of party affairs, he was also seen as having 'taken over' Li Changchun's post as informal "propaganda chief". Liu Yandong, who continued her term from the 17th Politburo, was promoted from State Councilor to Vice-Premier; therefore, no State Councilors sat on the 18th Politburo. Apart from the seven Standing Committee members, only three others maintained their membership from the previous Politburo: Liu Yandong, Li Yuanchao, and Wang Yang, meaning that 15 out of the 25 members were newcomers. Li held the office of vice-president, which Xi Jinping previously held, and Wang was transferred from his post as Guangdong party secretary to become Vice Premier. Li and Wang theoretically meet the age requirements to advance one level higher to the Standing Committee at the 19th Party Congress, the only two-term Politburo members apart from Xi Jinping and Li Keqiang who met this requirement.

Two women, Sun Chunlan and Liu Yandong, sat on the Politburo, the first time this has happened since 1973 (when Ye Qun and Jiang Qing were part of the Politburo). No ethnic minorities had a seat on the council.

== Composition ==
Members of the Political Bureau of the 18th Central Committee of the Chinese Communist Party
Officeholder		17th	19th	Birth	PM	Birthplace	Academic attainment	Gender	Offices held	Ref.
Fan Changlong	范长龙	New	Not	1947	1969	Liaoning	Not public: Was given a university education at the Central Party School	Male	One: Party-state office; Vice Chairman, Central Military Commission of the Central Committee	
Guo Jinlong	郭金龙	New	Not	1947	1979	Nanjing	Graduate: Master's degree in acoustics	Male	One: Party office; Secretary, Beijing Municipal Party Committee; Vice Chairman, Central Guidance Commission for Building Spiritual Civilization	
Han Zheng	韩正	New	Elected	1955	1979	Shanghai	Graduate: Master's degree in international political economy; Undergraduate degree in politics	Male	One: Party office; Secretary, Shanghai Municipal Party Committee	
Hu Chunhua	胡春华	New	Elected	1963	1983	Hubei	Graduate: Master's degree in world economics; Bachelor's degree in Chinese literature; Central Party School degree in cadre training	Male	One: Party office; Secretary, Guangdong Provincial Party Committee	
Li Jianguo	李建国	New	Not	1946	1971	Shandong	Graduate: Master's degree in Chinese Language and Literature	Male	Two: State offices; Vice Chairman, Standing Committee of the National People's Congress; Secretary-General, Standing Committee of the National People's Congress	
Li Keqiang	李克强	Old	Elected	1955	1974	Hefei	Graduate: Doctoral degree in Marxist legal studies; Undergraduate degree in chemical engineering	Male	Seven: Party offices; Head, Central Institutional Organisation Commission of the Central Committee; Deputy Chairman, Central Comprehensively Deepening Reforms Commission of the Central Committee; Deputy Chairman, Central Financial and Economic Affairs Commission of the Central Committee; Deputy Chairman, Central Cyberspace Affairs Commission of the Central Committee; State offices; Premier, State Council of the People's Republic of China; Head, State Council Leading Party Members Group; Head, Central Leading Group for Climate Change and Emissions Reduction	
Li Yuanchao	李源潮	Old	Not	1950	1978	Jiangsu	Graduate: Doctoral degree in Marxist legal studies; Master's degree in mathematics; Master's degree in management science; Graduate programme in scientific socialism	Male	One: State office; Vice President of the People's Republic of China	
Li Zhanshu	栗战书	New	Elected	1950	1975	Hebei	Graduate: Master's degree in business administration; Graduate programme in business economics; Undergraduate degree in politics	Male	One: Party office; Head, General Office of the Central Committee	
Liu Qibao	刘奇葆	New	Not	1953	1971	Anhui	Graduate: Master's degree in National economic planning and management; Undergraduate degree in history	Male	One: Party office; Head, Publicity Department of the Central Committee	
Liu Yandong	刘延东	Old	Not	1945	1964	Jiangsu	Graduate: Master's degree in sociology	Female	One: State office; Vice Premier of the People's Republic of China	
Liu Yunshan	刘云山	Old	Not	1947	1971	Shanxi	Not public: Was given a university education at the Central Party School	Male	Three: Party offices; First-ranked secretary, Central Committee Secretariat; President, Central Party School of the Central Committee; Chairman, Central Guidance Commission for Building Spiritual Civilization	
Ma Kai	马凯	New	Not	1946	1965	Shanghai	Graduate: Master's degree in politics	Male	One: State office; Vice Premier of the People's Republic of China	
Meng Jianzhu	孟建柱	New	Not	1947	1968	Jiangsu	Graduate: Master's degree in engineering	Male	One: Party office; Secretary, Central Politics and Law Commission of the Central Committee	
Sun Chunlan	孙春兰	New	Elected	1950	1973	Hebei	Graduate: Doctoral degree in political science; Doctoral degree in decision-making and management; Undergraduate degree in economic management	Female	One: Party office; Head, United Front Work Department of the Central Committee	
Sun Zhengcai	孙政才	New	Removed	1963	1988	Shandong	Graduate: Doctoral degree in agricultural science; Graduate programme in Marxist legal studies	Male	One: Party office; Secretary, Chongqing Municipal Party Committee	
Wang Huning	王沪宁	New	Elected	1955	1984	Shanghai	Graduate: Master's degree in Marxist legal studies; Graduate programme in international politics; Undergraduate degree in French	Male	One: Party office; Head, Central Policy Research Office of the Central Committee	
Wang Qishan	王岐山	Old	Not	1948	1983	Shanxi	Undergraduate: Undergraduate degree in history	Male	Two: Party office; Secretary, Standing Committee of the Central Commission for Discipline Inspection; Head, Central Leading Group for Inspection Work	
Wang Yang	汪洋	Old	Elected	1955	1975	Anhui	Graduate: Master's degree in management science; Bachelor's degree in public administration; Programme in political economy	Male	One: State office; Vice Premier of the People's Republic of China	
Xi Jinping	习近平	Old	Elected	1953	1974	Beijing	Graduate: Doctoral degree in Marxist legal studies; Undergraduate degree in chemical engineering	Male	Eleven: Party offices; General Secretary, Central Committee; Chairman, National Security Commission of the Central Committee; Chairman, Central Comprehensively Deepening Reforms Commission of the Central Committee; Head, Central Leading Group for Taiwan Affairs of the Central Committee; Head, Central Leading Group for Financial and Economic Work of the Central Committee; Head, Central Leading Group for Network Security and Information Technology of the Central Committee; Military offices; Chairman, Central Military Commission; Commander-in-chief, Joint Operations Command Center of the Central Military Commission of the People's Liberation Army; Head, Leading Group for National Defence and Military Reform of the Central Military Commission; Head, Office of the Central Integrated Military-Civilian Development Committee; State offices; President of the People's Republic of China	
Xu Qiliang	许其亮	New	Elected	1950	1967	Shandong	Graduate: Master's degree in military science	Male	One: Party-state office; Vice Chairman, Central Military Commission of the Central Committee	
Yu Zhengsheng	俞正声	Old	Not	1945	1964	Zhejiang	Graduate: Graduate programme in Missile engineering	Male	Two: Organisational office; Chairman, National Committee of the Chinese People's Political Consultative Conference; Chairman, China Council for the Promotion of Peaceful Reunification	
Zhang Chunxian	张春贤	New	Not	1953	1973	Henan	Graduate: Master's degree in management science; Undergraduate in engineering	Male	One: Party office; Secretary, Xinjiang Provincial Party Committee	
Zhang Dejiang	张德江	Old	Not	1946	1971	Liaoning	Graduate: Graduate programme in world economics; Undergraduate degree in Korean	Male	Two: Party office; Deputy Chairman, National Security Commission of the Central Committee; State office; Chairman, Standing Committee of the National People's Congress	
Zhang Gaoli	张高丽	Old	Not	1946	1973	Fujian	Graduate: Graduate programme in economics	Male	Nine: Party offices; Deputy Head, Central Leading Group for Comprehensively Deepening Reforms; State offices; First-ranked Vice Premier, State Council of the People's Republic of China; Deputy Head, National Leading Group for Climate Change and for Energy Conservation & Reduction of Pollution Discharge; Head, Leading Group for Rejuvenating the Northeast Region and Other Old Industrial Bases; Head, Leading Group for Western Region Development; Head, Leading Group for the 1st Nationwide Geography Conditions Survey; Head, Leading Group for Nationwide Economy Census; Head, Office of South-to-North Water Diversion Project; Deputy Chairman, National Energy Commission	
Zhao Leji	赵乐际	New	Elected	1957	1975	Shandong	Graduate: Graduate programme in currency and banking; Undergraduate degree in philosophy	Male	One: Party office; Head, Organization Department of the Central Committee	
