= 19th Politburo of the Chinese Communist Party =

The 19th Politburo of the Chinese Communist Party (CCP), formally the Political Bureau of the 19th Central Committee of the Communist Party of China, was elected at the 1st plenary session of the 19th Central Committee of the CCP on 25 October 2017 in the aftermath of the 19th National Congress. This electoral term was preceded by the 18th Politburo and succeeded by the 20th. Seven of the 25 members served in the 19th Politburo Standing Committee. It is the first Politburo in which all the members were born after the foundation of the People's Republic of China in 1949.

== Composition ==
Members of the Political Bureau of the 19th Central Committee of the Chinese Communist Party
Officeholder		18th	20th	Birth	PM	Birthplace	Education	Gender	Offices held	Ref.
Cai Qi	蔡奇	New	Elected	1955	1975	Fujian	Graduate	Male	One: Party office; Secretary, Beijing Municipal Party Committee	
Chen Min'er	陈敏尔	New	Elected	1960	1982	Zhejiang	Graduate	Male	One: Party office; Secretary, Chongqing Municipal Party Committee	
Chen Quanguo	陈全国	New	Not	1955	1976	Henan	Graduate	Male	Four: Party office; Deputy Head, Central Rural Work Leading Group; Secretary, Xinjiang Provincial Party Committee; Secretary, Xinjiang Production and Construction Corps; First Political Commissar, Xinjiang Production and Construction Corps	
Chen Xi	陈希	New	Not	1953	1978	Fujian	Graduate	Male	Two: Party office; President, Central Party School of the Central Committee; Head, Organisation Department of the Central Committee	
Ding Xuexiang	丁薛祥	New	Elected	1961	1984	Jiangsu	Graduate	Male	One: Party office; Head, General Office of the Central Committee	
Guo Shengkun	郭声琨	New	Not	1954	1974	Jiangxi	Graduate	Male	One: Party office; Secretary, Political and Legal Affairs Commission	
Han Zheng	韩正	Old	Not	1955	1979	Shanghai	Graduate	Male	Twelve: Party offices; Deputy Head, Central Comprehensively Deepening Reforms Commission; Head, Central Leading Group for Hong Kong and Macao Affairs; Deputy Head, Office of the Central Integrated Military-Civilian Development Committee; Director, Office of the Central Integrated Military-Civilian Development Committee; State offices; First-rankedVice Premier, State Council of the People's Republic of China; Head, Three Gorges Project Construction Committee; Head, South-North Water Diversion Construction Project Committee; Head, Central Leading Group for Belt and Road Initiative Construction; Head, Beijing-Tianjin-Hebei Joint Development Leading Group; Head, Central Leading Group for the Development of the Guangdong-Hong Kong-Macao Greater Bay Area; Head, Central Leading Group for Promoting Integrated Development of the Yangtze River Delta; Head, Central Leading Group for Inspection on Ecological and Environmental Protection	
Hu Chunhua	胡春华	Old	Not	1963	1983	Hubei	Graduate	Male	Seven: State offices; Vice Premier of the People's Republic of China; Head, Leading Group on Poverty Alleviation and Development; Head, Leading Group on Rural Works; Head, National Leading Group for Census on Poverty Alleviation; Head, National Leading Group for the Elimination of Wage Arrears for Migrant Workers; Head, Leading Group on Employment Work; Deputy Head, Central Leading Group for Belt and Road Initiative Construction	
Huang Kunming	黄坤明	New	Elected	1956	1976	Fujian	Graduate	Male	One: Party office; Head, Propaganda Department of the Central Committee	
Li Hongzhong	李鸿忠	New	Elected	1956	1976	Shenyang	Graduate	Male	One: State office; First Vice Chairman, NPC Standing Committee	
Li Keqiang	李克强	Old	Not	1955	1974	Hefei	Graduate	Male	Seven: Party offices; Head, Central Institutional Organisation Commission of the Central Committee; Deputy Chairman, Central Comprehensively Deepening Reforms Commission of the Central Committee; Deputy Chairman, Central Financial and Economic Affairs Commission of the Central Committee; Deputy Chairman, Central Cyberspace Affairs Commission of the Central Committee; State offices; Premier, State Council of the People's Republic of China; Head, State Council Leading Party Members Group; Head, Central Leading Group for Climate Change and Emissions Reduction	
Li Qiang	李强	New	Elected	1958	1983	Zhejiang	Graduate	Male	One: Party office; Secretary, Shanghai Municipal Party Committee	
Li Xi	李希	New	Elected	1956	1982	Gansu	Graduate	Male	Two: Party office; Secretary, Guangdong Provincial Party Committee	
Li Zhanshu	栗战书	Old	Not	1950	1975	Hebei	Graduate	Male	Five: Party office; Head, General Office of the Central Committee; Secretary, Central Work Committee for Organs of the Central Committee; Head, Office of the National Security Commission of the Central Committee; Head, Central Commission for the Protection of State Secrets of the Central Committee; State office; Chairman, Standing Committee of the National People's Congress	
Liu He	刘鹤	New	Not	1952	1976	Beijing	Graduate	Male	Eleven: Party offices; Head, Office of the Central Financial and Economic Affairs Commission; Deputy Head, Central Leading Group for United Front Work; State offices; Vice Premier of the People's Republic of China; Head, Financial Stability and Development Committee; Head, Air Traffic Control Committee; Head, Work Safety Committee; Head, Leading Group for Building an Advanced Manufacturing Industry; Head, Leading Group for the Promotion of Small and Medium-sized Enterprises; Head, Leading Group for Technological System Reform and Innovation System Construction; Head, Leading Group of the State Council on State-owned Enterprise Reform; Deputy Head, Leading Group for Science and Technology	
Sun Chunlan	孙春兰	Old	Not	1950	1973	Hebei	Graduate	Female	Four: Party offices; Deputy Head, Central Coordination Group for Hong Kong and Macao Affairs; Deputy Head, Central Leading Group for United Front Work; State offices; Vice Premier of the People's Republic of China; Head, Leading Group of Deepening Medical and Health System Reform	
Wang Chen	王晨	New	Not	1950	1969	Beijing	Graduate	Male	One: State office; Vice Chairman, of the Standing Committee of the National People's Congress	
Wang Huning	王沪宁	Old	Elected	1955	1984	Shanghai	Graduate	Male	Two: Party office; First-ranked Secretary, Secretariat of the Central Committee; Head, Central Policy Research Office of the Central Committee	
Wang Yang	汪洋	Old	Not	1955	1975	Anhui	Graduate	Male	Five: Organisational office; Chairman, National Committee of the Chinese People's Political Consultative Conference; Party office; Leader, Chinese People's Political Consultative Conference Party Group; Head, Central Coordination Group for Tibet Affairs; Head, Central Coordination Group for Xinjiang Affairs; Deputy Head, Central Leading Group for Taiwan Affairs	
Xi Jinping	习近平	Old	Elected	1953	1974	Beijing	Graduate	Male	Eleven: Party offices; General Secretary, Central Committee; Chairman, National Security Commission of the Central Committee; Chairman, Central Comprehensively Deepening Reforms Commission of the Central Committee; Head, Central Leading Group for Taiwan Affairs of the Central Committee; Head, Central Leading Group for Financial and Economic Work of the Central Committee; Head, Central Leading Group for Network Security and Information Technology of the Central Committee; Military offices; Chairman, Central Military Commission; Commander-in-chief, Joint Operations Command Center of the Central Military Commission of the People's Liberation Army; Head, Leading Group for National Defence and Military Reform of the Central Military Commission; Head, Office of the Central Integrated Military-Civilian Development Committee; State offices; President of the People's Republic of China	
Xu Qiliang	许其亮	Old	Not	1950	1967	Shandong	Graduate	Male	One: Party-state office; Vice Chairman, Central Military Commission	
Yang Jiechi	杨洁篪	New	Not	1950	1971	Shanghai	Graduate	Male	One: Party office; Head, Office of the Central Foreign Affairs Commission	
Yang Xiaodu	杨晓渡	New	Not	1953	1973	Shanghai	Graduate	Male	Four: Party office; Deputy Secretary, Standing Committee of the Central Commission for Discipline Inspection; State offices; Director, National Supervisory Commission; Director, National Bureau of Corruption Prevention; Minister of Supervision	
Zhang Youxia	张又侠	New	Elected	1950	1969	Beijing	Graduate	Male	One: Party-state office; First Vice Chairman, Central Military Commission	
Zhao Leji	赵乐际	Old	Elected	1957	1975	Shandong	Graduate	Male	Two: Party offices; Secretary, Standing Committee of the Central Commission for Discipline Inspection; Head, Central Leading Group for Inspection Work	
