= Death of Li Keqiang =

2023 death of former Chinese premier

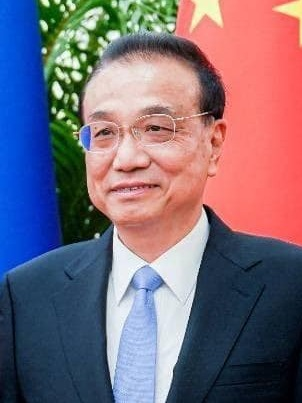
- Li Keqiang in January 2023
- Date: 27 October – 2 November 2023
- Location: China

Li Keqiang, former premier of the People's Republic of China and member of the 17th, 18th, and 19th Politburo Standing Committee of the Chinese Communist Party, died on 27 October 2023 at 00:10 CST in Shanghai, aged 68.

Li Keqiang became the youngest Premier at the time of leaving office and the earliest to die among all Premiers since the 1949 proclamation of the People's Republic of China.

== Background ==
=== Resignations from party and governmental positions ===
After the first plenary session of the 20th Central Committee of the Chinese Communist Party in October 2022, Li resigned from his party roles, including his membership of the Politburo Standing Committee. Following the first session of the 14th National People's Congress, he also stepped down as Premier, retiring from public office at the age of 67.

After his official retirement, Li maintained a low profile, did not participate in official affairs, and rarely appeared in public. On 30 August 2023, Li visited the Mogao Caves in Dunhuang, Gansu; this was his final public appearance.

=== Health status ===
According to the 2010 biography He Will Be China's Chief Steward: A Biography of Li Keqiang, Li suffered from severe myocarditis during his time at Peking University due to overexertion. He frequently experienced shortness of breath during physically strenuous activities.

Reports also indicated that Li had diabetes, which was further exacerbated by his demanding domestic and diplomatic work.

The South China Morning Post reported that Li Keqiang had previously had heart bypass surgery.

== Death ==
=== Sudden emergency ===
Li suffered a sudden heart attack while swimming at the Shanghai Dongjiao Hotel on 26 October 2023. He was accompanied by his wife Cheng Hong. It was reported that the heart attack occurred around noon on 26 October. Li Keqiang was rushed to the Shanghai Shuguang Hospital (East Campus) by security and medical personnel after the incident. All available resources were mobilized, including top experts from Shanghai and the installation of an extracorporeal membrane oxygenation (ECMO) device that afternoon. Despite emergency rescue efforts lasting over 10 hours, medical teams were unable to save him. Li died at 12:10 a.m. the next day.

=== News release ===
At 8:00 a.m. on 27 October, China Central Television's program "Morning News" aired a brief announcement of the death of Li Keqiang, delivered by the host Wang Yan. Subsequently, official media outlets, such as Xinhua News Agency and the China Central Television (CCTV) website, published identical official statements. Around 6:30 p.m., Xinhua News issued a formal condolence statement on behalf of the Central Committee of the Chinese Communist Party, the Standing Committee of the National People's Congress, the State Council, and the National Committee of the Chinese People's Political Consultative Conference. The statement referenced key political concepts, including the "Two Establishes," "Two Upholds," "Four Consciousnesses," and "Four Confidences." Later, at 7:00 p.m., the national news program Xinwen Lianbo positioned the announcement of condolences as the third news item, following coverage of activities involving current national leaders, including General Secretary of the Chinese Communist Party Xi Jinping and Premier Li Qiang. This arrangement mirrored the reporting style used for the announcement of former Premier Li Peng's death in 2019.

=== Relocation and viewing of the coffin ===
On the afternoon of 27 October, Li Keqiang's remains were transferred to Beijing from Shanghai aboard a special flight. Some roads were temporarily closed in Shanghai, with people along the route mourning. Upon arrival in Beijing, Li's remains was transferred to the PLA General Hospital in preparation for national mourning and funeral arrangements.

=== Farewell ceremony ===
On 2 November 2023, Tiananmen Square, Xinhua Gate, the Great Hall of the People and the Ministry of Foreign Affairs all flew at half-mast to mourn Li Keqiang

On 2 November, national flags were flown at half-mast at Tiananmen Square, Xinhua Gate, the Great Hall of the People, and the Ministry of Foreign Affairs; at the headquarters of Party committees and governments of all provinces, autonomous regions, and municipalities directly under the central government; in the special administrative regions of Hong Kong and Macao; at all land border crossings, maritime ports, and airports; as well as at all Chinese embassies and consulates abroad.

Li Keqiang's remains were transported to the Babaoshan Revolutionary Cemetery by a Nissan Civilian hearse. Around 10:00 a.m., a farewell ceremony was held in the cemetery's main funeral hall, attended by current and former national leaders. Along the route from the PLA General Hospital to Babaoshan, mourners gathered to pay their respects as the hearse passed.

In the early hours of the same day, areas surrounding Tiananmen Square were restricted to pedestrians and vehicles, with most of the entrances to the square temporarily closed. Despite the restrictions, some people took alternate routes into the square to witness the lowering of the national flag to half-mast following the morning flag-raising ceremony.

On the morning of 2 November, the remains of Li Keqiang were cremated at Babaoshan Revolutionary Cemetery. General Secretary of the Chinese Communist Party Xi Jinping and his wife, Peng Liyuan, attended the farewell ceremony at the cemetery along with members of the CCP Politburo Standing Committee Li Qiang—Zhao Leji, Wang Huning, Cai Qi, Ding Xuexiang, Li Xi—as well as Vice President Han Zheng. Former CCP General Secretary Hu Jintao sent a wreath to express his condolences.

In the official news footage, Li Keqiang's daughter was not seen. Li's brother, Li Keming, was seated in the rear row of the family section, alongside Li's widow, Cheng Hong. Li Xiaopeng, the Minister of Transport and son of former Premier Li Peng, attended the ceremony as a representative of a department under the State Council. Other attendees included individuals described as "close friends" of Li Keqiang during his lifetime.

On the afternoon of 2 November, Xinhua News Agency released a biography of Li Keqiang along with 12 photos highlighting significant moments of his life.

== Aftermath ==
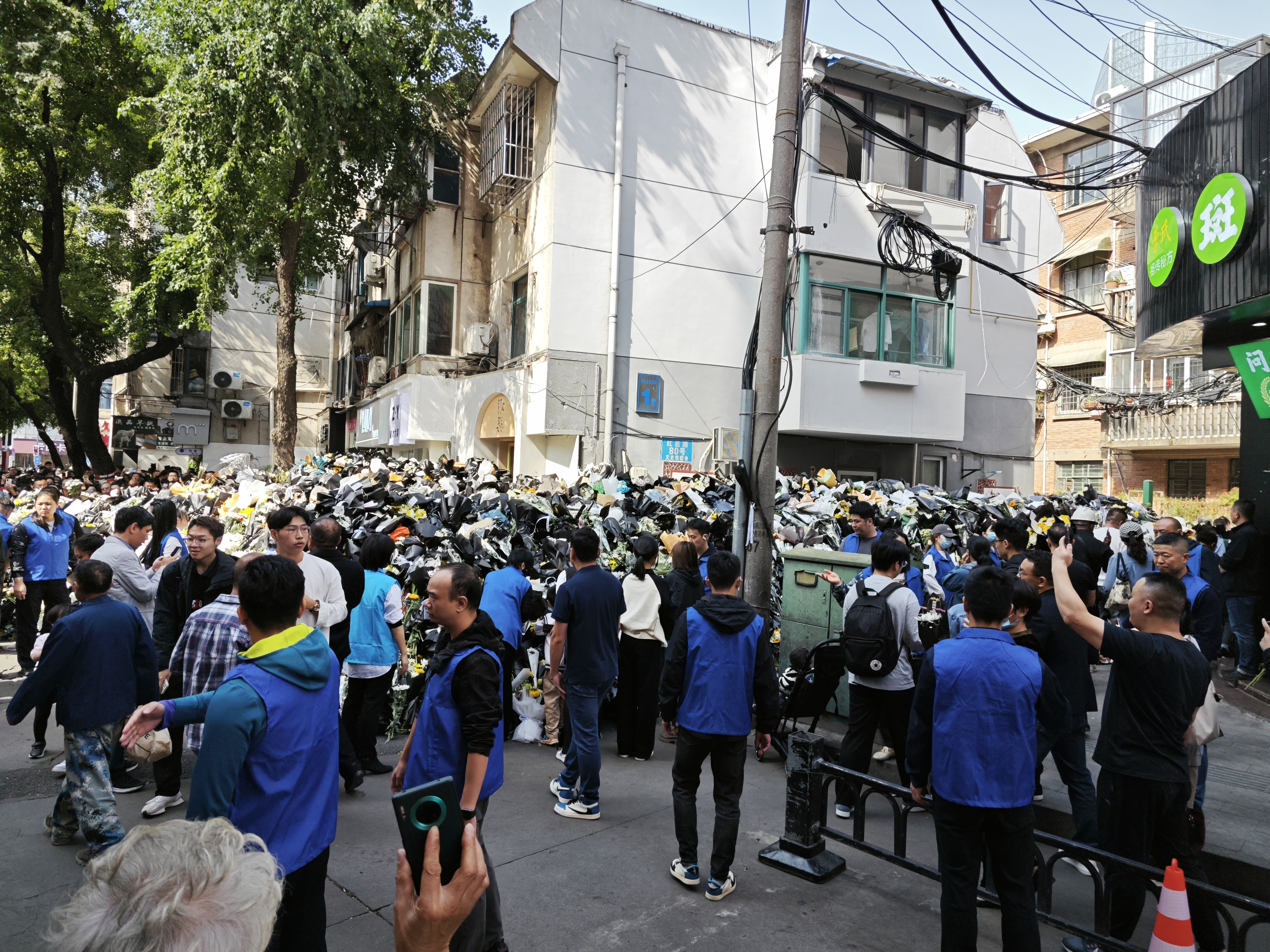
Crowds laid flowers in front of Li Keqiang's former residence in Hefei, Anhui Province, while people wearing blue vests were seen observing.

After the announcement of Li Keqiang's death, a large number of people spontaneously gathered at Li Keqiang's former residence in Luyang District, Hefei, Anhui Province, and at 80 Huizhou Avenue, which now serves as the Anhui Institute of Culture and History, to lay flowers and mourn. Many police officers were on site to guide the crowds, there are online video clips showing queues of mourners stretching over 200 meters on the morning of 28 October. Spontaneous mourning activities also occurred at Li's ancestral home in Jiuzi Village, Wuxu Town, Dingyuan County, Anhui Province, and at Qianxi Square in Zhengzhou, Henan Province. Subsequently, people from across the country took action to place chrysanthemums and condolence messages at various locations to express their grief. However, in order to put these activities under control and to stabilize the public sentiment, local governments kept such locations under close surveillance. Many tributed items, especially those with written messages, were swiftly confiscated and cleared by unidentified individuals wearing blue vests shortly after being placed.

After the announcement of Li Keqiang's death, the Central Cyberspace Affairs Commission Office began scrutinizing comments on various online platforms and censoring certain songs and keywords to prevent a recurrence of events like the 1989 Tiananmen Square protests and massacre. Some flower shops received orders specifying delivery to the former residence of Li Keqiang without specifying the recipient. Officials handled Li Keqiang's death with extreme caution, permitting only specific forms of mourning. Despite mostly positive sentiments among interviewees, ubiquitous personnel demanded silence from the public. In the The New York Times, columnist Yuan Li wrote that the mourning reflected "the public's sense of disillusionment that an era of reform and growth has been abandoned, and the profound powerlessness felt by people living in China under Xi Jinping, the most authoritarian leader since Mao Zedong".

== Reactions ==
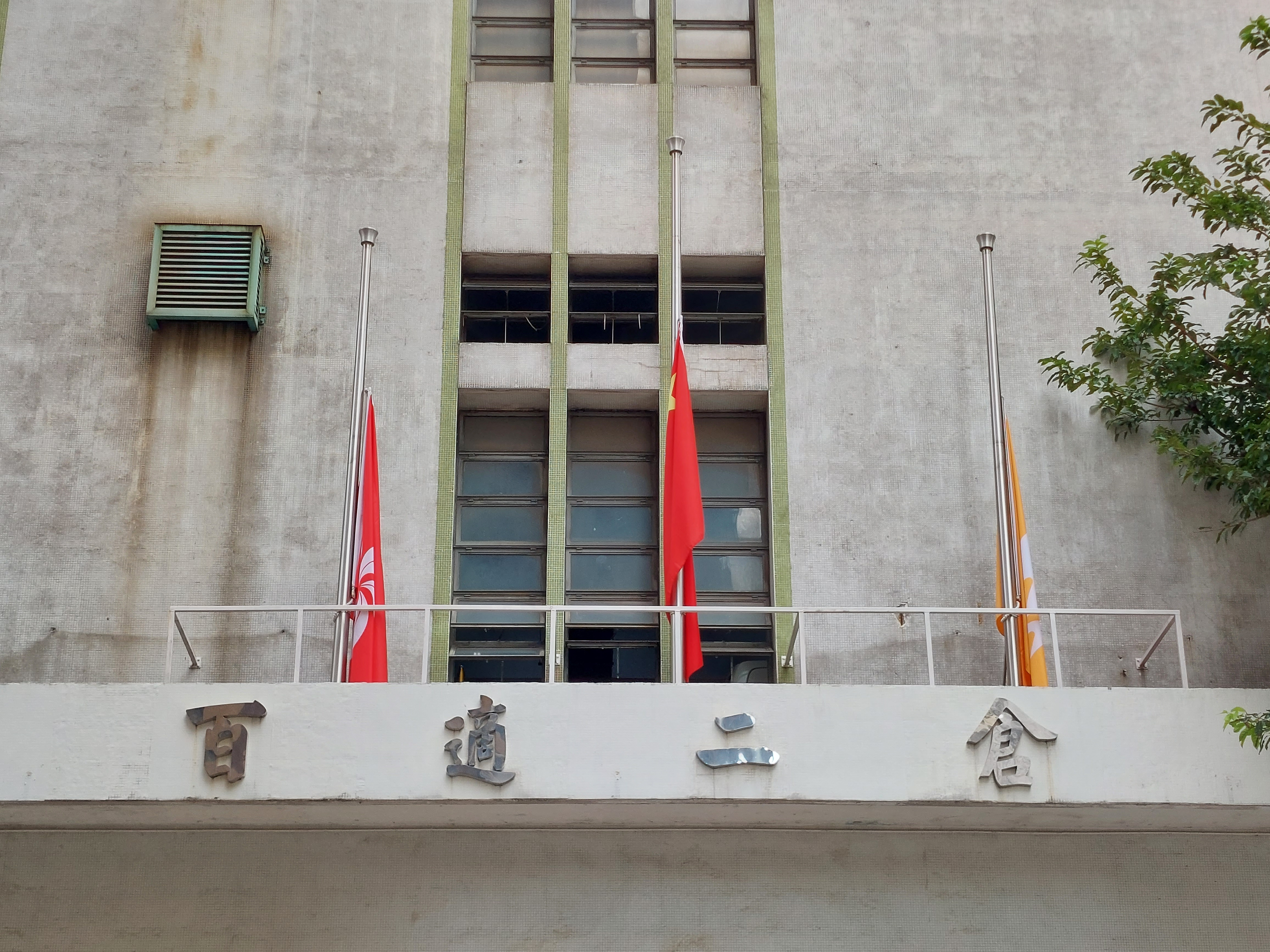
On the day of Li Keqiang's cremation, China Resources Shatin Cold Storage flew the national flag and the regional flag at half-mast to express condolences.

=== China ===
At the Chinese Ministry of Foreign Affairs press conference on 27 October 2023, a journalist from Agence France-Presse asked about the sudden death of former Chinese Premier Li Keqiang at the age of 68 due to a heart attack. The journalist inquired about the spokesperson's impressions of Li and whether they had any words of condolence. Spokesperson Mao Ning expressed deep sorrow over Li Keqiang's death and mentioned that Xinhua News Agency had already released a statement. Another journalist from Bloomberg asked for more details regarding Li's death, including information on condolences, memorial arrangements, and whether foreign representatives would be invited to related events. Mao Ning responded by urging attention to forthcoming obituaries and stated that arrangements such as condolences and invitations to foreign representatives would be announced in due course.

==== Hong Kong ====
- Chief Executive Lee Ka-chiu expressed deep sadness regarding the death of Li Keqiang. The former Chief Executive Leung Chun-ying, expressed profound condolences. Former member of the LegCo Tam Yiu-chung expressed profound shock upon hearing of Li Keqiang's death, stating that he deeply mourns the loss. Member of the LegCo Leung Mei-fun expressed regret over the sudden death of Premier Li Keqiang, describing him as a Premier for the people. She also noted that as a legal scholar, Li always paid attention to how Hong Kong could maintain its edge.

==== Macau ====
- Chief Executive Ho Iat-seng expressed his deepest condolences and said that Li Keqiang's contributions to the country and the people will always be remembered and cherished. The government announced on 1 November 2023, that the flags would be flown at half-mast at the government headquarters, Government House, and all border ports on 2 November, the day of Li Keqiang's funeral.

=== International reactions ===
- Afghanistan: On social media, Ambassador to Sri Lanka Ashraf Haidari expressed the following sentiment: "Life is so fleeting, gone in the blink of an eye! My condolences to the family and loved ones of the late Chinese Premier Li Keqiang, as well as to the government and people of China. I also extend my condolences to the government and people of the ancient neighboring country Afghanistan."
- Australia:
  - Prime Minister Anthony Albanese expressed his deep sorrow at the death of former Premier Li Keqiang of the State Council of the People's Republic of China. He noted significant progress in bilateral relations between Australia and China during Premier Li's tenure, including the signing of the Australia-China Free Trade Agreement. Last year, during the East Asia Summit, he had the opportunity to meet with Premier Li to discuss the importance of the bilateral relationship and expressed hopes for further development. Prime Minister Anthony Albanese extended heartfelt condolences on behalf of the Australian government and people to Premier Li's family and the Chinese people.
  - Former Prime Minister and Ambassador to the United States Kevin Rudd expressed deep sorrow over the death of former Chinese Premier Li Keqiang on social media. He emphasized that Premier Li, who hailed from the impoverished province of Anhui, China, came from humble beginnings.
  - Former Australian Prime Minister Malcolm Turnbull posted on X, saying, "Upon learning the sudden passing of Li Keqiang in Shanghai, Lucy (his wife) and I are deeply saddened. Li Keqiang served as Premier of the People's Republic of China for a decade until his retirement earlier this year. We had the pleasure of meeting him on several occasions, notably during his visit to Australia with his wife, Professor Cheng Hong, in 2017 to commemorate the 45th anniversary of diplomatic relations between Australia and China. I have always regarded Premier Li as a charming and pragmatic partner for cooperation. He was not bound by official talking points, but instead engaged in frank and thoughtful discussions on pressing issues of the time."
- Belgium: The official Weibo account of the Embassy of Belgium in China expressed condolences on the death of former Chinese Premier Li Keqiang, stating that during his ten-year tenure as Premier, he made significant contributions to promoting economic cooperation and friendly relations between the two countries through multiple visits to Belgium.
- Cambodia: Prime Minister Hun Manet sent a condolence telegram to Premier Li Qiang of the State Council of China, expressing condolences for the death of Li Keqiang. Former Prime Minister Hun Sen wrote a letter to Chinese leader Xi Jinping, expressing the deepest condolences for the death of Li Keqiang. Hun Sen stated that the death of Li Keqiang was a great loss to the Chinese people and the Party, emphasizing that he was a good friend of Cambodia. The Cambodian people will always remember his valuable contributions to the close friendship between the two countries and peoples.
- Canada: The official Weibo account of the Canadian Embassy in China expressed condolences for the sudden death of former Chinese Premier Li Keqiang, stating that he played an active role in promoting exchanges between Canada and China. The statement acknowledged Li's contributions to Sino-Canadian relations, which will be remembered by people.
- Cuba:
  - Miguel Díaz-Canel, the First Secretary of the Communist Party of Cuba and President of Cuba, expressed profound condolences to the Chinese Communist Party, government, and people for the death of Li Keqiang on X.
  - The head of the International Relations Department of the Central Committee of the Communist Party of Cuba, Emilio Lozada Garcia, conveyed condolences to the family of Li Keqiang on X.
- Denmark: The Chinese Embassy in Denmark expressed deep sorrow over the death of former Chinese Premier Li Keqiang through its official Weibo account. They extended condolences and sympathy to Li Keqiang's family. The Embassy highlighted Li Keqiang's numerous meetings with the Danish Prime Minister in the past and his significant contributions to Sino-Danish cooperation.
- Finland: The official Weibo account of the Finnish Embassy in China expressed condolences to the Chinese people for the sudden death of former Chinese Premier Li Keqiang. Premier Li had engaged in friendly discussions with Finnish President Sauli Niinistö during his visit to China in 2013, making positive contributions to the Finland-China relationship and the friendship between the two countries.
- France: The official Weibo account of the Embassy expressed in English, "With heavy hearts, we have learned of the death of former Chinese Premier Li Keqiang. He played a very active role in Sino-French relations. Our deepest condolences and support go out to his family."
- Germany: The official embassy Weibo expressed condolences on the death of former Chinese Premier Li Keqiang. Li was an important partner for Germany and had a positive impact on Sino-German relations. In November 2022, he met with German Chancellor Scholz in Beijing. His contributions to the development of Sino-German relations will be remembered by people.
- Indonesia: President Joko Widodo expressed deep sorrow upon learning of the death of Li Keqiang. He emphasized that Li Keqiang's contributions to strengthening the comprehensive strategic partnership between Indonesia and China will be forever remembered. He extended heartfelt condolences to Li Keqiang's family and the Chinese people.
- Iran: The official Weibo account of the Embassy in China wrote: "We are deeply saddened to learn of the passing of former Chinese Premier Li Keqiang. We extend our deepest condolences to the Chinese government, the Chinese people, and the family of Premier Li Keqiang. In February of this year, during the visit of Iranian President Raisi to China, Premier Li Keqiang expressed China's high regard for the development of Sino-Iranian relations. He expressed China's willingness to work with Iran to uphold mutual respect and equality, and to elevate Sino-Iranian comprehensive strategic partnership to new heights, for the sake of world peace, common development, and the well-being of both peoples. Though he is no longer with us, Premier Li Keqiang's legacy will endure. We will always remember his remarkable contributions to the advancement of Sino-Iranian relations."
- Ireland: The official Weibo account of the Irish Embassy in China expressed deepest condolences on the death of former Chinese Premier Li Keqiang and extended sincerest sympathies to his family. They recalled Mr. Li's visit to a farm in County Mayo, Ireland, in May 2015, where he gained firsthand experience in Ireland's high-quality agricultural products sector and explored opportunities for Irish-Chinese trade cooperation. They wished him eternal rest.
- Israel: The official Weibo account of the Israeli Embassy in China expressed deep condolences on behalf of the Israeli government for the death of former Premier of the State Council of the People's Republic of China, His Excellency Li Keqiang, and extended sincere sympathies to the family and friends of the deceased.
- Japan:
  - Chief Cabinet Secretary Hirokazu Matsuno said on the morning of the 27th when meeting with reporters: "Former Premier Li Keqiang played an important role in Sino-Japanese relations, including his state visit to Japan during the Japan-China-South Korea leaders' meeting in May 2018. I am deeply saddened to hear of his death and offer my heartfelt condolences." At the same time, the Embassy in China also posted the above comments on Weibo.
  - Prime Minister Fumio Kishida and Foreign Minister Yōko Kamikawa issued a condolence message on the 27th expressing profound sadness at the death of Premier Li Keqiang.
  - Former leader of the Democratic Party, Ichiro Ozawa, wrote in a post on X, mentioning that Li Keqiang, the current Premier of China, had visited Japan through the Japan-China Sincerity Fund established by him during his tenure as the first secretary of the Central Committee of the Communist Youth League of China and stayed at his hometown in Iwate Prefecture. He expressed regret over this incident, stating that it was a loss for China and lamenting its impact on the friendly development between Japan and China. He sincerely prayed for a resolution to this situation.
  - On 2 November, the day of Li Keqiang's cremation, the Japanese Embassy in China lowered its flag to half-mast in mourning.
- Malaysia:
  - Wee Ka Siong, the president of the Malaysian Chinese Association, expressed his deep condolences on the death of former Chinese premier Li Keqiang. On behalf of the Malaysian Chinese Association, he extended sincere condolences to Li Keqiang's family and the people of China.
  - Former Chief Minister of Penang, Lim Guan Eng, expressed his shock and sadness over the sudden death of Li Keqiang. He noted that Li Keqiang had only retired earlier this year, making the news particularly unexpected and heartbreaking.
  - Huang Jiading, former chairman of the Malaysia-China Business Council, stated that the late former Chinese Premier Li Keqiang made significant and tangible contributions to Sino-Malaysian relations during his tenure, particularly in the concrete realization of economic and trade cooperation. He expressed shock and sorrow at Li Keqiang's sudden death.
- Mexico: The official Weibo account of the Mexican Embassy in China expressed profound condolences for the untimely death of former Premier of the People's Republic of China, Li Keqiang, and extended sincere condolences to his family and the people of China.
- Netherlands: Ambassador Haosibo, the Dutch ambassador to China, expressed deep sorrow upon learning the unfortunate news of the death of former Chinese Premier Li Keqiang. He conveyed heartfelt condolences on behalf of the Dutch Embassy in China to Li Keqiang's family. He also recalled the numerous friendly exchanges he had with former Premier Li Keqiang, emphasizing their significance in further strengthening the Netherlands-China relationship.
- Norway: The Embassy expressed on its official Weibo account: "We deeply mourn the passing of former Chinese Premier Li Keqiang. Our sincerest condolences go out to his family, friends, and colleagues."
- Pakistan:
  - Prime Minister Anwaar ul Haq Kakar conveyed his condolences through the Pakistani Embassy in China, stating, "Upon learning of the unfortunate passing of former Chinese Premier Li Keqiang, I am deeply saddened and shocked. He was a good friend of Pakistan, and we fondly remember his visit to our country in 2013."
  - Foreign Minister Gilani also posted on X, saying, "I am deeply saddened by the news of Premier Li Keqiang's passing. He was a statesman who contributed to strengthening the friendship between Pakistan and China. During my tenure as Foreign Minister, I arranged his visit to Pakistan in May 2013. My condolences to Premier Li Keqiang, his family, and the Chinese people."
- Poland: The official Weibo account of the Polish Embassy in China wrote: 'On behalf of the Polish government, we express our deepest condolences on the passing of His Excellency Li Keqiang, former Premier of the People's Republic of China. He will be forever remembered by the world.
- Russia: Prime Minister Mikhail Mishustin expressed condolences on the death of Li Keqiang.
- Singapore:
  - On the morning of the 27th, Vice Premier Heng Swee Keat delivered a speech in Mandarin at the Insight China Global Forum. During his journey to the venue, he received the sudden news of the death of Li Keqiang, expressing deep regret. Heng stated that Li Keqiang had attached great importance to and actively promoted the relationship between China and Singapore during his tenure. He extended his deepest condolences to Mr. Li's family and the Chinese people.
  - Prime Minister Lee Hsien Loong sent a condolence letter to Chinese Premier Li Qiang on the 28th, expressing profound condolences on behalf of the Singaporean government for the death of former Chinese Premier Li Keqiang. Lee Hsien Loong stated that Li Keqiang had devoted himself to serving the country wholeheartedly, and under his leadership, China overcame many challenges, promoted reform and opening up, achieved economic growth, and significantly improved the lives of the Chinese people.
- South Korea: The Ministry of Foreign Affairs stated that Li Keqiang, as a good friend of South Korea, has made significant contributions to the development of relations between South Korea and China, for which the South Korean side highly commends him. We extend our deepest condolences to the deceased and offer heartfelt sympathy to his family.
- Switzerland: The Embassy expressed deep condolences through its official Weibo account for the death of former Chinese Premier Li Keqiang. Switzerland was his first destination in Europe after taking office as Premier, where he witnessed the signing of the China-Switzerland Free Trade Agreement. Our condolences go out to all who loved and respected him.
- Taiwan: During a press conference held by the Legislative Yuan caucus on the morning of the 27th, Democratic Progressive Party caucus convener and legislator Liu Shih-fang responded to questions from reporters about the death of Li Keqiang by expressing "considerable regret." She also mentioned that during Li Keqiang's tenure as premier, he dedicated himself to the internal affairs and economic development of mainland China, expressing sorrow at his death.
- United Kingdom: The official Weibo account of the Embassy wrote: "We mourn the passing of former Chinese Premier Li Keqiang. People will remember Li Keqiang for his contributions to the Chinese people and to strengthening bilateral relations between the UK and China. Li Keqiang visited the UK on multiple occasions. In 2014, he met with the late Queen Elizabeth II at Windsor Castle."
- United States:
  - During a meeting at the White House with Wang Yi, Director of the Office of the Central Commission for Foreign Affairs of the Chinese Communist Party and Minister of Foreign Affairs of China, President Joe Biden expressed condolences for the death of Li Keqiang. State Department spokesperson Miller also conveyed Secretary of State Antony Blinken's condolences for Li Keqiang's death.
  - On 3 November, Ambassador R. Nicholas Burns posted on social media platform X, saying he was "riding the Rejuvenation Express southward, looking forward to crossing the Yangtze and Yellow Rivers," echoing Li Keqiang's famous words "The Yangtze and Yellow Rivers will not reverse their course."
- Venezuela: President Nicolás Maduro expressed his condolences for the death of Li Keqiang on X, highlighting Li's contribution to cementing bilateral relations between Venezuela and China, and emphasizing his consistent stance in solidarity with Venezuela.
- Vietnam:
  - On 30 October, Vietnamese leaders extended their condolences to Chinese counterparts and the family of Li Keqiang. They expressed sorrow over Li Keqiang's death and highlighted his significant contributions to fostering friendly cooperation between Vietnam and China, particularly in deepening the comprehensive strategic cooperative partnership between the two countries. The Vietnamese government and people have consistently valued Li Keqiang's efforts in advancing bilateral relations. Additionally, the Vietnamese Minister of Foreign Affairs also sent a condolence message to the Chinese Minister of Foreign Affairs, conveying sorrow for Li Keqiang's demise.
  - On 1 November, Prime Minister Pham Minh Chinh led a senior delegation to the Chinese Embassy in Vietnam to pay their respects and sign the condolence book.
