= 18th Politburo Standing Committee of the Chinese Communist Party =

The 18th Politburo Standing Committee of the Chinese Communist Party, formally the Standing Committee of the Political Bureau of the 18th Central Committee of the Communist Party of China, was elected by the 1st plenary session of the 18th Central Committee on 15 November 2012, in the aftermath of the 18th National Congress of the Chinese Communist Party (CCP). It was preceded by the CCP's 17th Politburo Standing Committee and was succeeded by the 19th in 2017.

== Meetings ==
Disclosed meetings of the 18th Politburo Standing Committee
Date	Length	Type	Ref.
23 April 2013	1 day	Ordinary meeting	
25 April 2013	1 day	Ordinary meeting	
29 June 2013	1 day	Ordinary meeting	
30 July 2013	1 day	Ordinary meeting	
20 August 2014	1 day	Ordinary meeting	
16 January 2015	1 day	Ordinary meeting	
4 June 2015	1 day	Ordinary meeting	
20 August 2015	1 day	Ordinary meeting	
7 January 2016	1 day	Ordinary meeting	
10 January 2017	1 day	Ordinary meeting	

== Composition ==
Members of the Standing Committee of the Political Bureau of the 18th Central Committee of the Chinese Communist Party
Rank	Officeholder	Hanzi	17th PSC	19th PSC	Birth	PM	Birthplace	Academic attainment	No. of offices	Ref.
1	Xi Jinping	习近平	Old	Reelected	1953	1974	Beijing	Graduate: Doctoral degree in Marxist legal studies; Undergraduate degree in chemical engineering	Eleven: Party offices; General Secretary, Central Committee; Chairman, National Security Commission of the Central Committee; Chairman, Central Leading Group for Comprehensively Deepening Reforms; Head, Central Leading Group for Taiwan Affairs of the Central Committee; Head, Central Leading Group for Financial and Economic Work of the Central Committee; Head, Central Leading Group for Network Security and Information Technology of the Central Committee; Military offices; Chairman, Central Military Commission; Commander-in-chief, Joint Operations Command Center of the Central Military Commission of the People's Liberation Army; Head, Leading Group for National Defence and Military Reform of the Central Military Commission; Head, Office of the Central Integrated Military-Civilian Development Committee; State offices; President of the People's Republic of China	
2	Li Keqiang	李克强	Old	Reelected	1955	1974	Hefei	Graduate: Master's degree in business administration; Graduate programme in world economics; Graduate programme in engineering management; Undergraduate degree in agricultural mechanisation	Seven: Party offices; Head, Central Institutional Organisation Commission of the Central Committee; Deputy Chairman, Central Comprehensively Deepening Reforms Commission of the Central Committee; Deputy Chairman, Central Financial and Economic Affairs Commission of the Central Committee; Deputy Chairman, Central Cyberspace Affairs Commission of the Central Committee; State offices; Premier, State Council of the People's Republic of China; Head, State Council Leading Party Members Group; Head, Central Leading Group for Climate Change and Emissions Reduction	
3	Zhang Dejiang	张德江	New	Not	1946	1971	Liaoning	Graduate: Graduate programme in world economics; Undergraduate degree in Korean	Two: Party office; Deputy Chairman, National Security Commission of the Central Committee; State office; Chairman, Standing Committee of the National People's Congress	
4	Yu Zhengsheng	俞正声	New	Not	1945	1964	Zhejiang	Graduate: Graduate programme in Missile engineering	Two: Organisational office; Chairman, National Committee of the Chinese People's Political Consultative Conference; Chairman, China Council for the Promotion of Peaceful Reunification	
5	Liu Yunshan	刘云山	New	Not	1947	1971	Shanxi	Not made public: Was given a university education at the Central Party School	Three: Party office; First-ranked Secretary, Secretariat of the Central Committee; President, Central Party School of the Central Committee; Head, Central Guidance Commission for Building Spiritual Civilization of the Central Committee	
6	Wang Qishan	王岐山	New	Not	1948	1983	Shanxi	Undergraduate: Undergraduate degree in history	Two: Party offices; Secretary, Standing Committee of the Central Commission for Discipline Inspection; Head, Central Leading Group for Inspection Work	
7	Zhang Gaoli	张高丽	New	Not	1946	1973	Fujian	Graduate: Graduate programme in economics	Nine: Party offices; Deputy Head, Central Leading Group for Comprehensively Deepening Reforms; State offices; First-ranked Vice Premier, State Council of the People's Republic of China; Deputy Head, National Leading Group for Climate Change and for Energy Conservation & Reduction of Pollution Discharge; Head, Leading Group for Rejuvenating the Northeast Region and Other Old Industrial Bases; Head, Leading Group for Western Region Development; Head, Leading Group for the 1st Nationwide Geography Conditions Survey; Head, Leading Group for Nationwide Economy Census; Head, Office of South-to-North Water Diversion Project; Deputy Chairman, National Energy Commission	
