= Zhang Yabo =

Defector from China

Zhang Yabo (Chinese: 张亚博; born 15 October 1986) is a Han Chinese former police officer and prison guard from Xinjiang, China, who defected to Germany in August 2025. He is one of the few former members of China's security apparatus in Xinjiang to publicly testify about the region's system of mass detention, surveillance, and coercion targeting Uyghurs and other Muslim minorities. His account aligns with an existing body of evidence previously documented largely through satellite imagery, leaked government documents, and survivor testimony.

== Early life and career ==
Zhang was born into a poor rural Han Chinese family in a village in central Henan province. He moved to Xinjiang in 2006 to attend university and later worked as a mathematics teacher at a rural primary school. Seeking higher pay, he joined the local security system in late 2014 as a detention-center guard in the Hotan (Hetian) region.

He passed the civil-service examination and formally joined the police force around 2016. Between 2014 and 2023 he held a series of grassroots posts in the Hotan and Aksu areas, serving as a detention-center officer, village police officer, and an officer involved in labor transfers and the monitoring of released detainees. His duties included surveilling local residents, escorting prisoners, collecting "evidence," and taking part in community-level political control measures. He has said he witnessed beatings, sleep deprivation, and other mistreatment of detainees, while maintaining that he did not personally carry out torture. Zhang resigned from the police force in 2023, citing family and health reasons, and later relocated to southern China. In April 2025 he was baptized as a Roman Catholic.

== Defection ==
In August 2025, Zhang traveled to Germany on a group tour with his then-14-year-old son. While the group was visiting Neuschwanstein Castle in Bavaria, he and his son separated from the tour and traveled to Munich. There he contacted the World Uyghur Congress and applied for political asylum in Germany. He has since lived in a shelter in southern Germany; his son has been placed in a nearby foster arrangement while attending school.

His defection and testimony were first reported publicly in April 2026 by the German newspaper Der Spiegel, which verified his identity using photographs of his police identification and images of him in uniform outside a Xinjiang prison.

Chinese authorities reportedly froze his bank accounts, labeled him a traitor, and pressured or harassed family members remaining in China after his asylum application became known.

== Testimony and public statements ==
Zhang has provided journalists, researchers, and German lawmakers with documents—including police identification, pay records, and photographs—along with detailed accounts of the Xinjiang security system. He testified before the German Bundestag and cooperated with outlets including Der Spiegel and The New York Times. His testimony describes intensive surveillance of daily life, pressure on officers to meet detention quotas (internally referred to as “KPI anxiety”), forced labor transfers, and the scale of internment and political re-education targeting Uyghurs and other minorities. He described a shift toward less visible forms of coercion following the peak of repression from 2017 to 2019, with fewer watchtowers and camps but continued use of short-term detentions—sometimes for as little as fifteen days—for minor infractions, coupled with ongoing surveillance and political indoctrination. In his view, this reduced visibility should not be mistaken for genuine reform.

The New York Times profiled Zhang in a report published July 28, 2026. China correspondent Li Yuan wrote that his account corroborates long-documented patterns of repression in Xinjiang while adding insider details, and illustrates what an ordinary man pursuing career advancement could gain, and ultimately lose, by helping carry out the policies. Björn Alpermann, a China scholar at the University of Würzburg who interviewed Zhang extensively, said his testimony offered unusually granular evidence that repression continued past the peak of the internment campaign and became routinized in daily village life.

Zhang has described the region as a vast prison enclosed by an “ironclad wall” and has framed his decision to speak publicly in religious and moral terms, saying that he wishes to tell the truth about what he witnessed. He presented himself as both a participant in the system and, later, a victim of its pressures and of subsequent retaliation by Chinese authorities.
