= 15th Politburo Standing Committee of the Chinese Communist Party =

The 15th Politburo Standing Committee of the Chinese Communist Party, formally the Standing Committee of the Political Bureau of the 15th Central Committee of the Communist Party of China, was elected by the 1st plenary session of the 15th Central Committee in 1997, in the aftermath of the 15th National Congress of the Chinese Communist Party (CCP). It was preceded by the CCP's 14th Politburo Standing Committee and was succeeded by the 16th in 2002.

== Composition ==
Members of the Standing Committee of the Political Bureau of the 15th Central Committee of the Chinese Communist Party
Rank	Officeholder	Hanzi	14th PSC	16th PSC	Birth	PM	Death	Birthplace	Academic attainment	No. of offices	Ref.
1	Jiang Zemin	江泽民	Old	Not	1926	1946	2022	Jiangsu	Undergraduate: Bachelor's degree in electrical engineering	Five: Party offices; General Secretary, Central Committee; Head, Central Leading Group for Taiwan Affairs of the Central Committee; Head, Central Leading Group for Financial and Economic Work of the Central Committee; Military office; Chairman, Central Military Commission; State office; President of the People's Republic of China	
2	Li Peng	李鹏	Old	Not	1928	1945	2019	Shanghai	Graduate: Master's degree in hydroelectric engineering	One: State office; Chairman, Standing Committee of the National People's Congress	
3	Zhu Rongji	朱镕基	Old	Not	1928	1949	2026	Changsha	Undergraduate: Bachelor's degree in electrical engineering	One: State office; Premier, State Council of the People's Republic of China	
4	Li Ruihuan	李瑞环	Old	Not	1934	1959	Alive	Tianjin	Undergraduate: Bachelor's degree in construction engineering	One: Organisational office; Chairman, National Committee of the Chinese People's Political Consultative Conference	
5	Hu Jintao	胡锦涛	Old	Reelected	1942	1964	Alive	Jiangsu	Graduate: Master's degree in hydraulic engineering	Four: Party offices; First-ranked Secretary, Central Committee Secretariat; President, Party School of the Central Committee; Military office; Vice Chairman, Central Military Commission; State office; Vice President of the People's Republic of China	
6	Wei Jianxing	尉健行	New	Not	1931	1949	2015	Zhejiang	Undergraduate: Bachelor's degree in mechanical engineering; Bachelor's degree in architecture	One: Party office; Secretary, Standing Committee of the Central Commission for Discipline Inspection	
7	Li Lanqing	李岚清	New	Not	1932	1952	Alive	Jiangsu	Undergraduate: Bachelor's degree in enterprise management	One: State office; First-ranked Vice Premier of the People's Republic of China	
