= 14th Politburo Standing Committee of the Chinese Communist Party =

The 14th Politburo Standing Committee of the Chinese Communist Party, formally the Standing Committee of the Political Bureau of the 14th Central Committee of the Communist Party of China, was elected by the 1st plenary session of the 14th Central Committee in 1992, in the aftermath of the 14th National Congress of the Chinese Communist Party (CCP). It was preceded by the CCP's 13th Politburo Standing Committee and was succeeded by the 15th in 1997.

== Composition ==
Members of the 14th Politburo Standing Committee
R.	Officeholder		13th	15th	Birth	PM	Death	Birthplace	Academic attainment	Positions	Ref.
1	Jiang Zemin	江泽民	Old	Elected	1926	1946	2022	Jiangsu	Undergraduate: Bachelor's degree in electrical engineering	Five: Party offices; General Secretary, Central Committee; Head, Central Leading Group for Taiwan Affairs of the Central Committee; Head, Central Leading Group for Financial and Economic Work of the Central Committee; Military office; Chairman, Central Military Commission; State office; President of the People's Republic of China	
2	Li Peng	李鹏	Old	Elected	1928	1945	2019	Shanghai	Graduate: Master's degree in hydroelectric engineering	One: State office; Premier, State Council of the People's Republic of China	
3	Qiao Shi	乔石	Old	Not	1924	1940	2015	Shanghai	None	One: State office; Chairman, Standing Committee of the National People's Congress	
4	Li Ruihuan	李瑞环	Old	Elected	1934	1959	Alive	Tianjin	Undergraduate: Bachelor's degree in construction engineering	One: Organisational office; Chairman, National Committee of the Chinese People's Political Consultative Conference	
5	Zhu Rongji	朱镕基	New	Elected	1928	1949	2026	Changsha	Undergraduate: Bachelor's degree in electrical engineering	One: State office; First-ranked Vice Premier, State Council of the People's Republic of China	
6	Liu Huaqing	刘华清	New	Not	1916	1929	2011	Hubei	None	One: Military office; First-ranked Vice Chairman, Central Military Commission	
7	Hu Jintao	胡锦涛	New	Elected	1942	1964	Alive	Jiangsu	Graduate: Master's degree in hydraulic engineering	Two: Party offices; First-ranked Secretary, Central Committee Secretariat; President, Party School of the Central Committee	
