= 17th Politburo Standing Committee of the Chinese Communist Party =

The 17th Politburo Standing Committee of the Chinese Communist Party, formally the Standing Committee of the Political Bureau of the 17th Central Committee of the Communist Party of China, was elected by the 1st plenary session of the 17th Central Committee in 2007, in the aftermath of the 17th National Congress of the Chinese Communist Party (CCP). It was preceded by the CCP's 16th Politburo Standing Committee and was succeeded by the 18th in 2012.

== Composition ==
Members of the Standing Committee of the Political Bureau of the 17th Central Committee of the Chinese Communist Party
Rank	Officeholder	Hanzi	16th PSC	18th PSC	Birth	PM	Birthplace	Academic attainment	No. of offices	Ref.
1	Hu Jintao	胡锦涛	Old	Not	1942	1964	Jiangsu	Graduate: Master's degree in hydraulic engineering	Five: Party offices; General Secretary, Central Committee; Head, Central Leading Group for Taiwan Affairs of the Central Committee; Head, Central Leading Group for Financial and Economic Work of the Central Committee; Head, Central Leading Group for Network Security and Information Technology of the Central Committee; Military offices; Chairman, Central Military Commission; President of the People's Republic of China	
2	Wu Bangguo	吴邦国	Old	Not	1941	1964	Anhui	Graduate: Master's degree in engineering	One: State office; Chairman, Standing Committee of the National People's Congress	
3	Wen Jiabao	温家宝	Old	Not	1942	1965	Tianjin	Graduate: Doctoral degree in geological survey; Bachelor's degree in structural geology	One: State office; Premier, State Council of the People's Republic of China	
4	Jia Qinglin	贾庆林	Old	Not	1940	1959	Hebei	Graduate: Master's degree in engineering of electric motor and appliance design and manufacture	One: Organisational office; Chairman, National Committee of the Chinese People's Political Consultative Conference	
5	Li Changchun	李长春	Old	Not	1944	1965	Liaoning	Graduate: Master's degree in industrial enterprise automation engineering	Two: Party office; Chairman, Central Guidance Commission on Building Spiritual Civilization	
6	Xi Jinping	习近平	New	Reelected	1953	1974	Beijing	Graduate: Doctoral degree in Marxist legal studies; Undergraduate degree in chemical engineering	Four: Party offices; First-ranked Secretary, Central Committee Secretariat; Vice Chairman, Central Military Commission of the Central Committee; President, Central Party School of the Central Committee; State office; Vice President of the People's Republic of China	
7	Li Keqiang	李克强	New	Reelected	1955	1974	Hefei	Graduate: Master's degree in business administration; Graduate programme in world economics; Graduate programme in engineering management; Undergraduate degree in agricultural mechanisation	One: State office; First-ranked Vice Premier, State Council of the People's Republic of China	
8	He Guoqiang	贺国强	New	Not	1943	1966	Hunan	Graduate: Master's degree in chemical engineering	Two: Party offices; Secretary, Standing Committee of the Central Commission for Discipline Inspection; Head, Central Leading Group for Inspection Work	
9	Zhou Yongkang	周永康	New	Not	1942	1964	Jiangsu	Graduate: Master's degree in geophysical survey and exploration	One: Party office; Secretary, Central Political and Legal Affairs Commission	
