= 19th Politburo =

19th Politburo may refer to:

- 19th Politburo of the Chinese Communist Party
- Presidium of the 19th Congress of the Communist Party of the Soviet Union
