= 19th Politburo Standing Committee of the Chinese Communist Party =

The 19th Politburo Standing Committee of the Chinese Communist Party, formally the Standing Committee of the Political Bureau of the 19th Central Committee of the Communist Party of China, was elected by the 1st plenary session of the 19th Central Committee on 25 October 2017, in the aftermath of the 19th National Congress of the Chinese Communist Party (CCP). It was preceded by the CCP's 18th Politburo Standing Committee and was succeeded by the 20th in October 2022.

== Meetings ==
Disclosed meetings of the 19th Politburo Standing Committee
Date	Length	Type	Ref.
15 January 2018	1 day	Ordinary meeting	
22 February 2018	1 day	Ordinary meeting	
16 August 2018	1 day	Ordinary meeting	
7 January 2019	1 day	Ordinary meeting	
7 January 2020	1 day	Ordinary meeting	
25 January 2020	1 day	Ordinary meeting	
3 February 2020	1 day	Ordinary meeting	
12 February 2020	1 day	Ordinary meeting	
26 February 2020	1 day	Ordinary meeting	
4 March 2020	1 day	Ordinary meeting	
18 March 2020	1 day	Ordinary meeting	
8 April 2020	1 day	Ordinary meeting	
29 April 2020	1 day	Ordinary meeting	
6 May 2020	1 day	Ordinary meeting	
14 May 2020	1 day	Ordinary meeting	
17 July 2020	1 day	Ordinary meeting	
22 October 2020	1 day	Ordinary meeting	
3 December 2020	1 day	Ordinary meeting	
7 January 2021	1 day	Ordinary meeting	
6 January 2022	1 day	Ordinary meeting	
17 March 2022	1 day	Ordinary meeting	
31 March 2022	1 day	Ordinary meeting	
5 May 2022	1 day	Ordinary meeting	

== Composition ==
Members of the Standing Committee of the Political Bureau of the 19th Central Committee of the Chinese Communist Party
R.	Officeholder		18th	20th	Birth	PM	Birthplace	Academic feats	Positions	Ref.
1	Xi Jinping	习近平	Old	Elected	1953	1974	Beijing	Graduate: Doctoral degree in Marxist legal studies; Undergraduate degree in chemical engineering	Eleven: Party offices; General Secretary, Central Committee; Chairman, National Security Commission of the Central Committee; Chairman, Central Comprehensively Deepening Reforms Commission of the Central Committee; Head, Central Leading Group for Taiwan Affairs of the Central Committee; Head, Central Leading Group for Financial and Economic Work of the Central Committee; Head, Central Leading Group for Network Security and Information Technology of the Central Committee; Military offices; Chairman, Central Military Commission; Commander-in-chief, Joint Operations Command Center of the Central Military Commission of the People's Liberation Army; Head, Leading Group for National Defence and Military Reform of the Central Military Commission; Head, Office of the Central Integrated Military-Civilian Development Committee; State offices; President of the People's Republic of China	
2	Li Keqiang	李克强	Old	Not	1955	1974	Anhui	Graduate: Master's degree in business administration; Graduate programme in world economics; Graduate programme in engineering management; Undergraduate degree in agricultural mechanisation	Seven: Party offices; Head, Central Institutional Organisation Commission of the Central Committee; Deputy Chairman, Central Comprehensively Deepening Reforms Commission of the Central Committee; Deputy Chairman, Central Financial and Economic Affairs Commission of the Central Committee; Deputy Chairman, Central Cyberspace Affairs Commission of the Central Committee; State offices; Premier, State Council of the People's Republic of China; Head, State Council Leading Party Members Group; Head, Central Leading Group for Climate Change and Emissions Reduction	
3	Li Zhanshu	栗战书	New	Not	1950	1975	Hebei	Graduate: Master's degree in business administration; Graduate programme in business economics; Undergraduate degree in politics	Five: Party office; Head, General Office of the Central Committee; Secretary, Central Work Committee for Organs of the Central Committee; Head, Office of the National Security Commission of the Central Committee; Head, Central Commission for the Protection of State Secrets of the Central Committee; State office; Chairman, Standing Committee of the National People's Congress	
4	Wang Yang	汪洋	New	Not	1955	1975	Anhui	Graduate: Master's degree in management science; Bachelor's degree in public administration; Programme in political economy	Five: Organisational office; Chairman, National Committee of the Chinese People's Political Consultative Conference; Party office; Leader, Chinese People's Political Consultative Conference Party Group; Head, Central Coordination Group for Tibet Affairs; Head, Central Coordination Group for Xinjiang Affairs; Deputy Head, Central Leading Group for Taiwan Affairs	
5	Wang Huning	王沪宁	New	Elected	1955	1984	Shanghai	Graduate: Master's degree in Marxist legal studies; Graduate programme in international politics; Undergraduate degree in French	Two: Party office; First-ranked Secretary, Secretariat of the Central Committee; Head, Central Policy Research Office of the Central Committee	
6	Zhao Leji	赵乐际	New	Elected	1957	1975	Shandong	Graduate: Graduate programme in currency and banking; Undergraduate degree in philosophy	Two: Party offices; Secretary, Standing Committee of the Central Commission for Discipline Inspection; Head, Central Leading Group for Inspection Work	
7	Han Zheng	韩正	New	Not	1954	1979	Shanghai	Graduate: Master's degree in international political economy; Undergraduate degree in politics	Twelve: Party offices; Deputy Head, Central Comprehensively Deepening Reforms Commission; Head, Central Leading Group for Hong Kong and Macao Affairs; Deputy Head, Office of the Central Integrated Military-Civilian Development Committee; Director, Office of the Central Integrated Military-Civilian Development Committee; State offices; First-rankedVice Premier, State Council of the People's Republic of China; Head, Three Gorges Project Construction Committee; Head, South-North Water Diversion Construction Project Committee; Head, Central Leading Group for Belt and Road Initiative Construction; Head, Beijing-Tianjin-Hebei Joint Development Leading Group; Head, Central Leading Group for the Development of the Guangdong-Hong Kong-Macao Greater Bay Area; Head, Central Leading Group for Promoting Integrated Development of the Yangtze River Delta; Head, Central Leading Group for Inspection on Ecological and Environmental Protection	
