= Central Auditing Commission =

Central Auditing Commission may refer to:

- Central Auditing Commission of the Chinese Communist Party
- Central Auditing Commission of the Socialist Unity Party of Germany
- Central Auditing Commission of the Communist Party of the Soviet Union
- Central Auditing Commission of the Workers' Party of Korea
- Central Auditing Commission of the League of Communists of Yugoslavia
