= 16th Politburo Standing Committee of the Chinese Communist Party =

The 16th Politburo Standing Committee of the Chinese Communist Party, formally the Standing Committee of the Political Bureau of the 16th Central Committee of the Communist Party of China, was elected by the 1st plenary session of the 16th Central Committee in 2002, in the aftermath of the 16th National Congress of the Chinese Communist Party (CCP). It was preceded by the CCP's 15th Politburo Standing Committee and was succeeded by the 17th in 2007.

== Composition ==
Members of the Standing Committee of the Political Bureau of the 16th Central Committee of the Chinese Communist Party
Rank	Officeholder	Hanzi	15th PSC	17th PSC	Birth	PM	Death	Birthplace	Academic attainment	No. of offices	Ref.
1	Hu Jintao	胡锦涛	Old	Reelected	1942	1964	Alive	Jiangsu	Graduate: Master's degree in hydraulic engineering	Five: Party offices; General Secretary, Central Committee; Head, Central Leading Group for Taiwan Affairs of the Central Committee; Head, Central Leading Group for Financial and Economic Work of the Central Committee; Head, Central Leading Group for Network Security and Information Technology of the Central Committee; Military offices; Chairman, Central Military Commission; President of the People's Republic of China	
2	Wu Bangguo	吴邦国	New	Reelected	1941	1964	2024	Anhui	Graduate: Master's degree in engineering	One: State office; Chairman, Standing Committee of the National People's Congress	
3	Wen Jiabao	温家宝	New	Reelected	1942	1965	Alive	Tianjin	Graduate: Doctoral degree in geological survey; Bachelor's degree in structural geology	One: State office; Premier, State Council of the People's Republic of China	
4	Jia Qinglin	贾庆林	New	Reelected	1940	1959	Alive	Hebei	Graduate: Master's degree in engineering of electric motor and appliance design and manufacture	One: Organisational office; Chairman, National Committee of the Chinese People's Political Consultative Conference	
5	Zeng Qinghong	曾庆红	New	Not	1939	1960	Alive	Jiangxi	Graduate: Master's degree in engineering	Two: Party office; President, Central Party School of the Central Committee; State office; Vice President of the People's Republic of China	
6	Huang Ju	黄菊	New	Died	1938	1966	2007	Shanghai	Graduate: Master's degree in electrical machinery manufacturing	One: State office; Vice Premier of the People's Republic of China	
7	Wu Guanzheng	吴官正	New	Not	1938	1963	Alive	Jiangxi	Graduate: Doctoral degree in engineering	One: Party office; Secretary, Standing Committee of the Central Commission for Discipline Inspection	
8	Li Changchun	李长春	New	Reelected	1944	1965	Alive	Liaoning	Graduate: Master's degree in industrial enterprise automation engineering	Two: Party office; Chairman, Central Guidance Commission for Spiritual Civilization	
9	Luo Gan	罗干	New	Not	1935	1960	Alive	Shandong	Graduate: Master's degree in engineering	One: Party office; Secretary, Central Political and Legal Affairs Commission	
