= People's Liberation Army's Combat Readiness Levels =

Chinese alert awareness system

The PLA's combat readiness level (中国人民解放军战备等级) is the alert awareness system used by the People's Liberation Army to signal the PRC's combat readiness posture (similar to the American DEFCON system). Different readiness levels activate different set of preparatory actions by the PLA. The system has four levels, with One being the highest (possible war imminent) and Four the lowest. It is the Central Military Commission's responsibility (through the JOCC) to call changes in the readiness level. At different levels, the People's Liberation Army takes different actions to deal with different degrees of emergency.

China uses other readiness systems, such as the Firefighting Action Readiness system, and the Militia's three-level readiness system.

== System levels ==
The PLA's combat readiness system is divided into four levels. Each level has clearly indicated measures and actions of mobilization that the PLA needs to take to face the crisis. The CMC assesses the impact of foreign military activities, and the likelihood of China being attacked.

Different combat readiness levels may apply only to specific areas, or to specific services and arms of the PLA. In case of localized threats, high levels may apply to a district and not to others.

The measures or actions required by the PLA's combat readiness level go from very basic, such as conducting combat readiness inspections, strengthening patrols, and maintaining communications open, to highly strict and urgent measures of mobilization and preparation for shooting war if the emergency is deemed to require it.

Contrary to the DEFCON system, a state of perfect defense normality does not have a readiness number, and level 1 does not imply the near-certainty of shooting war. The PLA's military doctrine explicitly recommends the use of readiness signalling as a form of deterrence.

The standard conditions for each of the readiness levels are as follows:

PLA Readiness Level	Condition	State	Actions
Readiness Level One (一级战备)	International situation extremely tense.; high chance of war breaking out with a foreign power.	Entering War Readiness State.	PLA forces in full alert, on duty 24-hours.; Intensify surveillance.; Reserve units mobilized.; Ordnance placed at the ready.; Fortify positions.
Readiness Level Two (二级战备）	International situation intermediately tense.; Foreign military operations likely to directly affect China.	Entering War preparation mobilization state.	PLA personnel on-duty overtime.; Strengthen Communications.; Strengthen Surveillance.; Enlarging service units; Begin mobilization of reserves.; Prepare war materiel at the ready.; Establish defensive positions.; Conduct combat training.
Readiness Level Three (三级战备)	International situation tense.; Foreign military operations may affect China.	Entering combat mobilization state.	All personnel on extra duty, all leave cancelled.; Strengthen communications.; Carry out surveillance.; Restrict traffic into military facilities.; Prepare to expand military units.; Ready war materiel.; Prepare fortified positions.
Readiness Level Four (四级战备)	Large scale military actions by foreign powers.; Possibility of it affecting China.	Preserving normal state.	Adjust PLA shifts.; Increase preparation inspections.; Increase patrols.; Strengthen border defenses.; Preserve ordinary communications.

The readiness system is not used in situations of complete low international tensions. It can also be raised by steps or by several steps depending on the changing international situation.

== History ==
Since the establishment of the PLA's combat readiness level system, the CRL has been raised several times.

=== Taiwan Strait Crisis（1996） ===
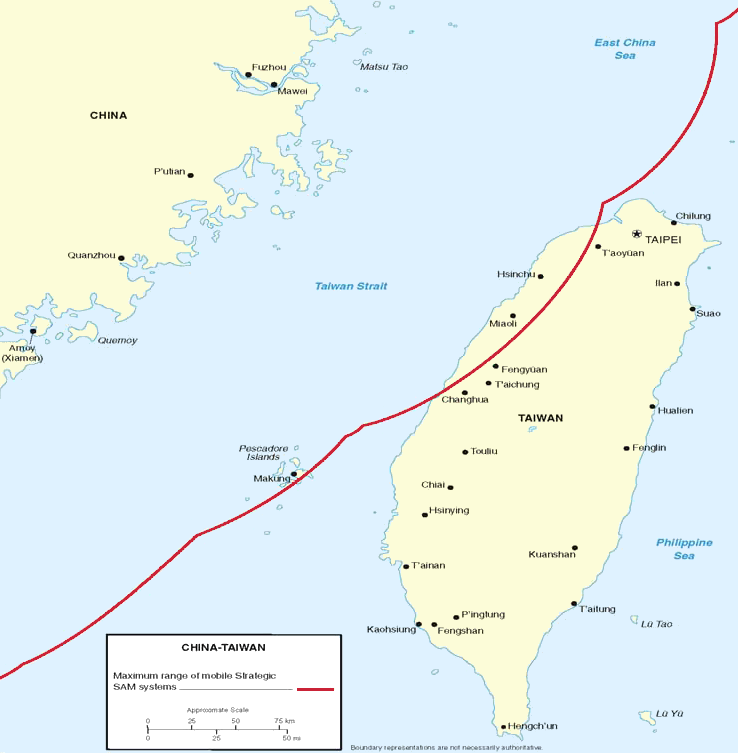
Ranges of the missiles tested by the PRC during the 1996 crisis.

In 1995, Republic of China president Li Teng-Hui visited the US in an official capacity. The PRC government decided to carry out two large scale missile test operations around the island of Taiwan to deter any further moves. The US reacted by sending two 7th fleet carrier groups to cruise through the Taiwan Strait. As a reaction, the CMC declared the Nanjing Military Region raised to level one.

=== "Two Countries" Thesis ===
In 1999，then President of the Republic of China Li Teng-hui declared the "Two Countries" thesis that seemed to support independence. Forces in Fujian were raised to level 3 readiness.

=== Hainan Island incident ===
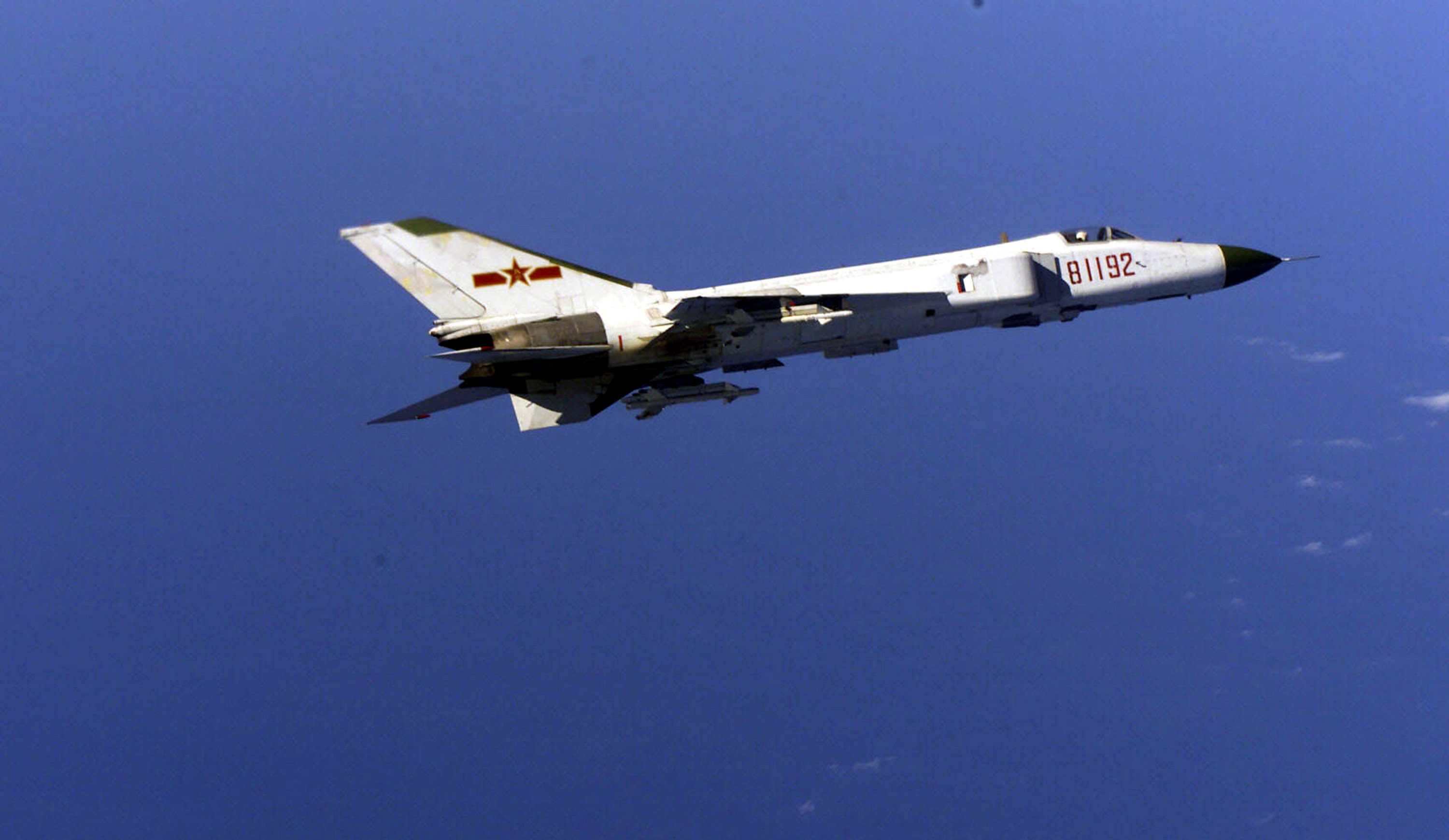
J-8 Interceptor Plane

On 1 April 2001, an American EP-3 Aries sigint plane collided midair with a J-8II interceptor south of Hainan. The Chinese pilot died and the American plane was forced to land on Hainan island. PLA Forces on the island were placed on level 1 readiness for a short period, until negotiations started with the US.

=== 2004 Republic of China Elections ===
In 2004，ROC's president Chen Shui-bian was seeking reelection. For over a year before the election, the PLA forces on the Taiwan Strait were kept on state 2.

=== 2008 Republic of China elections ===
For the 2008 ROC elections, the readiness level of the forces in the strait were raised to level 1.

=== 2011 Kashgar Terrorist Attacks ===
On 30 July 2011, double attacks on Kashgar city of Xinjiang province resulted in declaration of a level 1 event, and martial law was imposed in the region to preempt any further unrest.

=== 2011 Kim Jong-Il's death ===
On 17 December 2011, to deal with the uncertainty associated with the sudden death of North Korean leader Kim Jong-Il, the CMC increased readiness state to 3 on the Sino-Korean border.

=== 2013 Korean Peninsula Crisis ===
2013年2月12日2 December 2013, North Korea decided to disregard international opposition and restart nuclear testing, and in 5 March the same year, it declared its intention not to be bound to the Korean Armistice (for the sixth time). In the face of North Korean hardline attitude, the PRC mobilized extra troops to its border, and declared a readiness condition 1 for the border area.

=== Galwan Valley Skirmishes ===
In 2020, as the result of the Galwan valley skirmishes and consequent border tensions, the readiness level was raised to level 3 for the Xinjiang and Tibet Military Districts. The level was further raised to level 2 after actual shooting was reported.

== See also ==
Joint Operations Command Center
