= PLA Northern Theater Joint Operations Command Center =

Joint Operations Command Center of the People's Liberation Army Northern Theater

- Chinese: 北部战区联合作战指挥中心中心; pinyin: "Beibù zhànqū liánhé zuòzhàn zhǐhuī zhōngxīn zhōngxīn"
- Emblem of the People's Liberation Army
- Active: 2016–present
- Country: People's Republic of China
- Allegiance: Chinese Communist Party
- Branch: People's Liberation Army
- Role: Joint Operations Command
- Part of: Central Military Commission
- Garrison/HQ: Shenyang, Liaoning Province

Commanders
- Current commander: Xi Jinping (Commander-in-Chief)

PLA Northern Theater Joint Operations Command Center (中国人民解放军北部战区联合作战指挥中心) aka NTC-JOCC, located in Shenyang City, Liaoning Province, is affiliated to the People's Liberation Army Northern Theater Command Joint Staff Department with a theater deputy-grade and is the main joint operations command organ (JOCO) for the Northern Theater of the PLA. It is subordinate to the Central Military Commission's Joint Operations Command Center.

== History ==
On November 27, 2015, Ministry of Defense spokesperson Yang Yujun stated while discussing the 2015 Military Reforms what measures would be taken to improve the joint combat command system, "The main issue is to adapt to the requirements for winning information-based wars and for effectively fulfilling missions and tasks, and for that we must establish theater joint operations command institutions, improve the Military Commission's joint operations command institutions, and build a sound, capable and efficient strategic campaign command system." On February 1, 2016, Yang Yujun stated at a special press conference of the Ministry of National Defense that the theater is "the highest joint operational command institution in our new strategic direction".。

Around February 2016, the five newly established theaters established their own theater joint operations command centers. The Theater Joint Operations Command Centers were built on the basis of the recently dissolve Military Region's Operations Command Centers, with the addition of the other services (the Air Force, the Navy, and Rocket Force), and adding operational elements such as surveying, mapping, navigation, and airspace management, and adjusting the settings of command seats.

The new JOCOs started to focusing on training staff to deal with the complexities of joint operations The Northern Theater Joint Operations Command Center started a month-long set of training exercises almost immediately after being set up in January 2016. At 12:00 on the night of February 2, 2016, the Northern Theater Joint Operations Command Center officially started trial operation. In early April 2016, the first batch of 44 military regulations for the Northern Theater Command was compiled into the "Compilation of Military Regulations for the Northern Theater Command". The Joint Operations Command Center of the Northern Theater organized a drill almost every day in accordance with the requirements of the "Joint Operations" guidelines. On April 19, in his role as Commander-in-Chief of the Joint Operations Command Center of the Central Military Commission, sat at the Central JOCC HQ in Beijing, and using the secure communications system was able to receive reports from the Commander of the Northern Theater, Song Puxuan (宋普选), via video.。
