= PLA Eastern Theater Joint Operations Command Center =

Joint Operations Command Center of the People's Liberation Army Eastern Theater

- Chinese: 东部战区联合作战指挥中心; pinyin: "Dōngbù zhànqū liánhé zuòzhàn zhǐhuī zhōngxīn"
- Emblem of the People's Liberation Army
- Active: 2016–present
- Country: China
- Allegiance: Chinese Communist Party
- Branch: People's Liberation Army
- Role: Joint Operations Command
- Part of: Central Military Commission
- Garrison/HQ: Nanjing, Jiangsu Province

Commanders
- Current commander: Xi Jinping (Commander-in-Chief)

The People's Liberation Army Eastern Theater Joint Operations Command Center, located in Nanjing, Jiangsu Province, is the supreme joint operations command unit for all the forces under the Eastern Theater Command. It is affiliated to the PLA's Eastern Theater Joint Staff Department, and directly under the control of the Central Military Commission's Joint Operations Command Center.

== History ==
On November 27, 2015, Ministry of National Defense spokesperson Yang Yujun, regarding the 2015 military reforms, specified the measures were taken to improve the joint combat command system, "The main thing is to adapt to the requirements of winning information-based wars, and to effectively fulfill these missions and tasks we must establish theater joint operations command institutions, improve the Military Commission's joint operations command institutions, and build a sound, capable and efficient strategic campaign command system." On February 1, 2016, Yang Yujun stated at a special press conference of the Theater command is "the highest joint operational command organization in this strategic direction."

Around February 2016, the five newly established theaters each established its own joint operations command centers. The Theater Joint Operations Command Centers were built on the basis of the previous Military Region's Operations Command Centers. The new JOCCs added the other services --the Air Force, Navy, and Rocket Force-- and added operational support elements such as surveying, mapping, navigation, and airspace management, and adjusted the structure of command seats. Among them, the Eastern Theater Joint Operations Command Center organized dozens of additional command seats for the JOCC.

In February 2016, the Eastern Theater Joint Operations Command Center entered trial operation, and the "Joint Operations Command Center Operation Specifications" were issued and printed. On 13 February 2017, the Eastern Theater Command organized the certification ceremony of the first batch of the Eastern Theater Joint Operations Command Center personnel. Hundreds of commanders and staff officers received junior duty qualification certificates and badges. As of 2017, more than 80% of the personnel in the Eastern Theater Command HQ had passed the qualification certification of on-duty personnel stipulated in the "Implementation Measures for Qualification Certification of Duty Personnel at Theater Joint Command Centers (Trial)."
