= Central Leading Group for United Front Work =

Chinese Communist Party body

- 中央统一战线工作领导小组
- Emblem of the Chinese Communist Party

Agency overview
- Formed: July 30, 2015; 11 years ago
- Type: Leading small group
- Jurisdiction: Chinese Communist Party
- Headquarters: Beijing
- Agency executives: Wang Huning, Leader; Shi Taifeng, Deputy Leader
- Parent agency: Central Committee of the Chinese Communist Party

Central Leading Group for United Front Work
- Simplified Chinese: 中央统一战线工作领导小组
Transcriptions
Standard Mandarin
- Hanyu Pinyin: Zhōngyāng Tǒngyī Zhànxiàn Gōngzuò Lǐngdǎo Xiǎozǔ

The Central Leading Group for United Front Work is a coordination body set up under the Central Committee of the Chinese Communist Party responsible for united front work.

== History ==
The central leading group was established on 30 July 2015 by the Central Committee of the CCP. In 2016, the leading group inspected united front work over a period of seven months.

== Functions ==
The central leading group is responsible for the implementing, supervising and inspecting the principles, policies, laws and regulations related to the united front, and guiding the of CCP and state bodies on united front work. The office of the central leading group is located at the United Front Work Department.

== See also ==
- Organization of the Chinese Communist Party
