= Yuan Li (journalist) =

Yuan Li (Chinese: 袁莉; pinyin: Yuan Li; born c. 1972) is a Chinese-American journalist, columnist, and podcast host. She is an Asia technology columnist for The New York Times, where she writes the The New New World column focusing on China's influence on global business, politics, and society. Yuan is also the founder and host of the Chinese-language podcast "Conservation with Yuan Li" (不明白播客), which discusses contemporary Chinese social, economic, and political issues by delivering uncensored interviews with experts and ordinary Chinese.

== Life and work ==
Yuan was born and grew up in Yinchuan, the capital of China's Ningxia Hui Autonomous Region. As a child, she developed an interest in journalism after reading interviews by Italian reporter Oriana Fallaci, including her conversation with Deng Xiaoping.

She studied at Huazhong Normal University in China before pursuing graduate studies in the United States. In 2002, Yuan earned a Master of Science in journalism from the Columbia University Graduate School of Journalism and later a Master of Science in international relations from the Elliott School of International Affairs at George Washington University.

Yuan began her journalism career in the late 1990s at the state-run Xinhua News Agency in Beijing, where she served as an international news editor. She was later posted as a foreign correspondent in Southeast and South Asia, covering events in Thailand (based in Bangkok), Laos, and war-torn Afghanistan (based in Kabul).

In 2004, Yuan joined The Wall Street Journal (WSJ) as a technology reporter in New York, focusing on U.S. telecommunications and the early mobile internet boom. She advanced to become a columnist for WSJ.com and, in 2008, relocated to Beijing as editor of the WSJ's Chinese-language website. During her 14 years at WSJ, Yuan split time between New York, Beijing, and Hong Kong, covering China's rise as a technology power, gender issues in the tech industry, state control in tech companies, and internet censorship.

In May 2018, Yuan joined The New York Times as its inaugural Asia technology columnist, based initially in Hong Kong. She authors the biweekly The New New World column, which examines China's domestic policies and their global ripple effects, including topics like the U.S.-China tech rivalry, the MeToo movement, the zero-COVID policy, economic slowdowns, and AI development.

In May 2022, Yuan co-founded a Chinese-language podcast "Conversations with Yuan Li” (不明白播客, Bù Míng Bái Podcast) as the producer and host. The podcast is available on YouTube, Spotify, and Apple Podcast, and aims to "provide uncensored interviews with experts and ordinary Chinese about current affairs in China".
