= Central Auditing Commission of the Chinese Communist Party =

Body of the Central Committee of the Chinese Communist Party

Central Auditing Commission
- 中央审计委员会
- Emblem of the Chinese Communist Party

Agency overview
- Formed: March 2018; 8 years ago
- Type: Policy coordination and consultation body
- Jurisdiction: Chinese Communist Party
- Headquarters: Beijing
- Agency executives: Xi Jinping, Director; Li Qiang, Deputy Director; Cai Qi, Deputy Director; Hou Kai, Office Director
- Parent agency: Central Committee of the Chinese Communist Party
- Child agency: Office of the Central Auditing Commission

Central Auditing Commission of the Chinese Communist Party
- Simplified Chinese: 中央审计委员会
Transcriptions
Standard Mandarin
- Hanyu Pinyin: Zhōngyāng Shěnjì Wěiyuánhuì

The Central Auditing Commission is an agency of the Central Committee of the Chinese Communist Party responsible for auditing work.

== History ==
The commission was established in March 2018 as the deepening the reform of the Party and state institutions to strengthen the CCP's leadership over auditing work.

== Functions ==
The Office of the Central Auditing Commission is located within the National Audit Office.

== Membership ==
=== 19th Central Committee ===
- Director
  - Xi Jinping, General Secretary of the Chinese Communist Party, President of China, Chairman of the Central Military Commission
- Deputy Directors
  - Li Keqiang, Premier of China, member of the Politburo Standing Committee of the Chinese Communist Party
  - Zhao Leji, Secretary of the Central Commission for Discipline Inspection, member of the Politburo Standing Committee of the Chinese Communist Party

=== 20th Central Committee ===
- Director
  - Xi Jinping, General Secretary of the Chinese Communist Party, President of China, Chairman of the Central Military Commission
- Deputy Directors
  - Li Qiang, Premier of China, member of the Politburo Standing Committee of the Chinese Communist Party
  - Cai Qi, First-ranked Secretary of the Secretariat, member of the Politburo Standing Committee of the Chinese Communist Party

== See also ==
- Central Auditing Commission of the Socialist Unity Party of Germany
- Central Auditing Commission of the Communist Party of the Soviet Union
- Central Auditing Commission of the Workers' Party of Korea
