= National Energy Commission =

State agency in People's Republic of China

- 国家能源委员会
- Formation: 2010
- Type: Policy coordination and consultation body
- Headquarters: Beijing
- Chairman: Li Keqiang
- Vice Chairman: Han Zheng
- Parent organization: State Council of the People's Republic of China
- Subsidiaries: General Office of the National Energy Commission
- Affiliations: National Energy Administration
- Website: nyj.ndrc.gov.cn

The National Energy Commission (NEC; Chinese: 国家能源委员会; pinyin: Guójiā Néngyuán Wěiyuánhuì) is an interdepartmental coordinating agency of the State Council that coordinates the overall energy policies for the People's Republic of China. The body includes 23 members from other agencies such as environment, finance, central bank, National Development and Reform Commission.

The purpose of this new commission is to draft a new energy development strategy, evaluate energy security and coordinate international cooperation on climate change, carbon reduction and energy efficiency.

== History ==
China had a Ministry of Energy established in 1988 but it was disbanded five years after its portfolio overlapped with existing ministries.

In 2003, National Energy Bureau was created under the National Development and Reform Commission (NDRC) which reports to the Chinese State Council, which has broad administrative and planning control over energy in the Chinese economy.

In 2008, National Energy Administration (NEA) was established but lacked power to carry out its tasks because the energy sector management was spread between various agencies.

China has experienced power outages, concerns of growing imported energy demands, energy security and challenges coordinating energy supply and demand. The NEC was established in 2010 to elevate the role of energy policy and security in Chinese policymaking.

== Functions ==
The NEC is the top State Council agency responsible for China's energy policy. It is responsible for energy decision-making, formulating development strategies related to energy, and coordinating domestic energy development as well as international cooperation on energy. The General Office of the NEC is located in the National Development and Reform Commission, with the NDRC chairman usually serving as the NEC Office director.

== Membership ==
The NEC is usually chaired by the premier, with the first-ranking vice premier serving as its vice chairman.

=== List of Chairmen ===
1. Wen Jiabao (2010–2013)
2. Li Keqiang (2013–2023)
3. Li Qiang (2023–present)

=== Current membership ===
Chairman

- Li Qiang, Premier, Politburo Standing Committee

Vice Chairmen

- Ding Xuexiang, First-ranked Vice-Premier, Politburo Standing Committee

Members

- He Lifeng, Minister in charge of the National Development and Reform Commission
- Wang Yi, Minister of Foreign Affairs
- Zhang Yi, Chairman of the State-owned Assets Supervision and Administration Commission
- Wan Gang, Minister of Science and Technology
- Miao Wei, Minister of Industry and Information Technology
- Geng Huichang, Minister of State Security
- Lou Jiwei, Minister of Finance
- Jiang Daming, Minister of Land and Resources
- Zhou Shengxian, Minister of Environmental Protection
- Yang Chuantang, Minister of Transport
- Chen Lei, Minister of Water Resources
- Gao Hucheng, Minister of Commerce
- Liu Shiyu, Vice Governor of the People's Bank of China
- Wang Jun, Chair of the State Administration of Taxation
- Yang Dongliang, Director of the State Bureau for Supervision and Safety
- Shang Fulin, Chair of the Commission for Banking Regulation
- Wang Guanzhong, People's Liberation Army Deputy Chief of Staff
- Nur Bekri, Director of the National Energy Administration

== See also ==
- State Information Center
- Economy of China
- Category:Energy in China
