= Central Military Commission Joint Operations Command Center =

Central Joint Operations Command Center of the People's Liberation Army

- Chinese: 中央军事委员会联合作战指挥中心 pinyin: zhōngyāng jūnshì wěiyuánhuì liánhé zuòzhàn zhǐhuī zhōngxīn
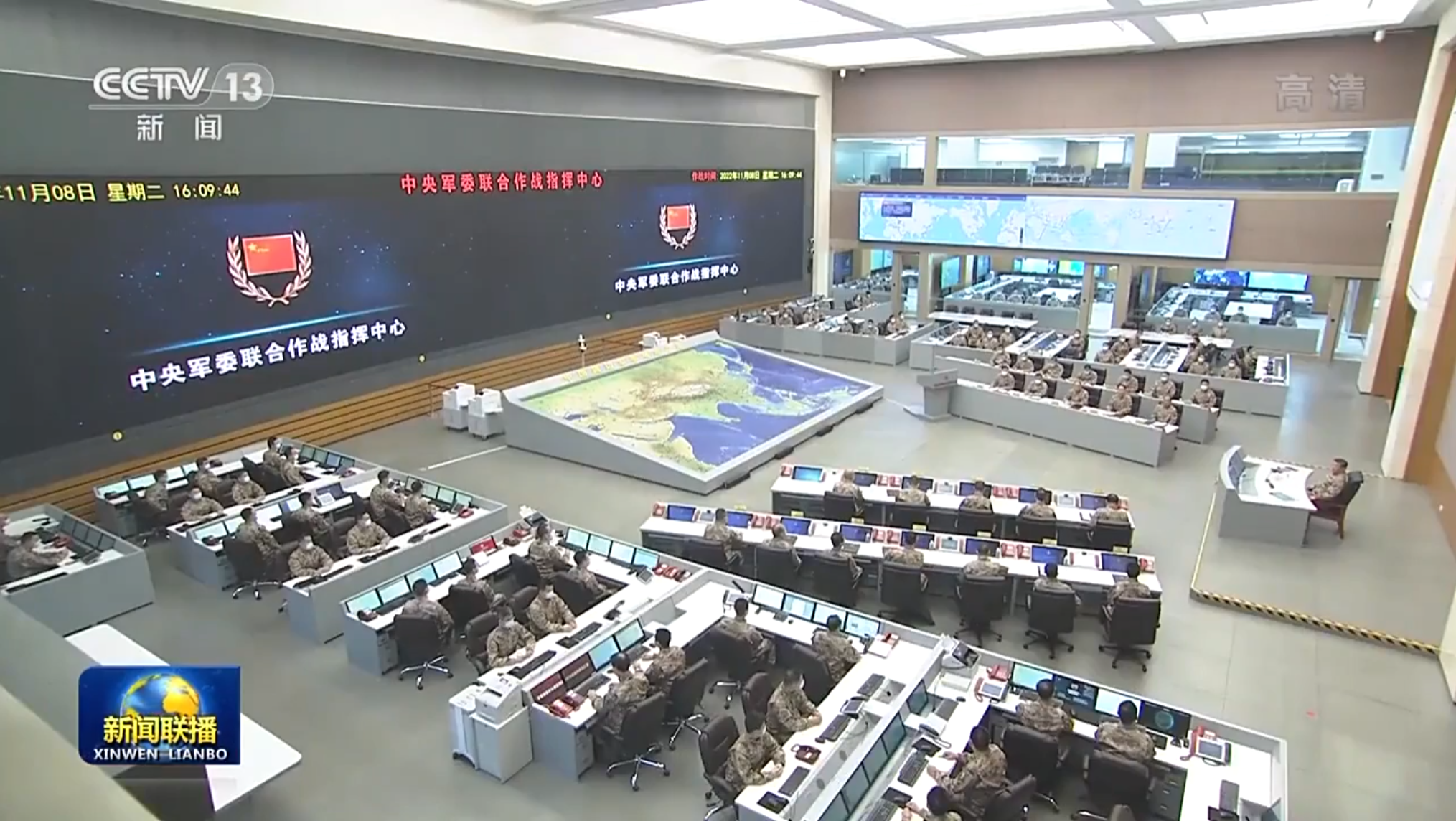
- CMC JOCC watch floor in 2022
- Active: 2016–present
- Country: China
- Allegiance: Chinese Communist Party
- Type: Command center
- Role: Joint Operations Command
- Part of: Central Military Commission
- Garrison/HQ: Qinglongqiao, Haidian, Beijing
- Mottos: 绝对忠诚、善谋打仗 指挥高效、敢打必胜 'Absolute Loyalty, Excellence at Planning, Efficient Command, Dare to Fight and Win'

Commanders
- Commander-in-Chief: Xi Jinping

The Central Military Commission Joint Operations Command Center (JOCC) is the main command and control operations center of the combined forces of the People's Liberation Army. It is a theater command grade unit under the direct control of the Central Military Commission (CMC) of the Chinese Communist Party (CCP). Its main watch floor is located in an underground facility in the Haidian district of Beijing.

The JOCC is the highest-level combat command & control unit in China, capable when active of commanding operations for all services in all the theaters. All the members of the CMC are members of the Command Center. There are local JOCOs at every command theater, which are subordinate to the Beijing JOCC.

== History ==
The Joint Operations Command Center of the Central Military Commission was established at the beginning of the 21st century in part to coordinate air operations in the East China Sea. The center was originally affiliated to the General Staff Department of the Chinese People's Liberation Army and was responsible for the joint command of the three armed forces branches. Originally called the Joint Operations Command Bureau of the Operations Department of the General Staff Headquarters of the Chinese People's Liberation Army, Liu Yulin served as its deputy director.

By 2014, the Joint Operations Command Center was located in the Staff Department's Xishan Underground Command Compound at Dongsimu Village, Xianhongqi, Haidian District, Beijing, a compound at least 100 meters underground and designed to resist a nuclear strike.

At the Central Military Commission reform work conference in November 2015, it was proposed to "establish theater-level joint operations command organizations and improve the Military Commission's joint operations command organization". In January 2016 the center's parent organization General Staff Department of the PLA was abolished as part of the 2015 military reforms and the center was reorganized into the newly formed Joint Staff Department of the Central Military Commission. In 2016 the engineering design research and innovation team of the People's Liberation Army Rocket Force (specialist in underground facilities) renovated the new Joint Operations Command Center. On 20 April 2016, General Secretary of the Chinese Communist Party Xi Jinping went on an inspection tour of the new facilities, and this was the first time the Center operating room was revealed to the public with photos. A visit to the JOCC in 2022 was also the first occasion in which Xi was referred to as "Commander-in-Chief of the Central Military Commission" (军委联指总指挥) Some analysts interpreted this move as an attempt to display strength and strong leadership and as being more "political than military."

The JOCC was transferred from the Joint Staff Department to direct control by the CMC sometime in 2022

== Organization ==
- Surveying, Mapping, and Navigation Group (测绘导航大队)
- Meteorology and Oceanography Group (气象海洋大队)
- Battlefield Posture Group (战场态势大队)
- Command Security Group (指挥保障大队)
- Comprehensive Information Service Group (综合信息服务大队)
- Network and Electronic Countermeasures Group (网电对抗大队)
- Communications Security Group (通信保障大队)
- Frequency Spectrum Control Group (管控大队)
- Airspace Management Group (空域管理大队)
- Targeting Security Group (目标保障大队)

== Top Leadership ==
- CCP General Secretary Xi Jinping (Chairman of the CMC)
- PLAGF General Zhang Youxia (Vice Chairman of CMC)
- PLAGF General He Weidong (Vice Chairman of CMC)
- PLAN Admiral Dong Jun (Minister of Defense)
- PLAGF General Liu Zhenli (CMC Chief of Staff)
- PLAN Admiral Miao Hua (CMC Political Work)
- PLARF General Zhang Shengmin (Discipline Committee)
- PLAGF General Wu Yanan
- PLARF Lt General Li Jun
- PLAAF Lt General Dong Li

== Subordinate Units ==
=== Theater Command's Joint Operations Command Centers ===
As part of the 2015 Reforms, on 1 February 2016 all the five new Theater Commands set up their own Joint Operations Command Centers under the control of the national JOCC.

1. PLA Eastern Theater Joint Operations Command Center
2. PLA Northern Theater Joint Operations Command Center
3. PLA Western Theater Joint Operations Command Center
4. PLA Southern Theater Joint Operations Command Center
5. PLA Central Theater Joint Operations Command Center

== See also ==
- People's Liberation Army's Combat Readiness Levels
- National Flood Control and Drought Relief Headquarters
- National Forest and Grassland Fire Prevention and Extinguishing Command
