= Central Leading Group for Military Reform =

Chinese policy coordination group

Leading Group for National Defence and Military Reform of the Central Military Commission
- 中央军委深化国防和军队改革领导小组
- Emblem of the Chinese Communist Party

Agency overview
- Formed: March 2014; 12 years ago
- Type: Leading small group
- Jurisdiction: Chinese Communist Party
- Headquarters: Beijing
- Agency executives: Xi Jinping, Leader; Zhang Youxia, Executive Deputy Leader
- Parent agency: Central Military Commission of the Chinese Communist Party

The Leading Group for National Defence and Military Reform of the Central Military Commission (Chinese: 中央军委深化国防和军队改革领导小组; pinyin: Zhōngyāng Jūnwěi Shēnhuà Guófáng hé Jūnduì Gǎigé Lǐngdǎo Xiǎozǔ) is a policy formulation and implementation body set up under the Central Military Commission and ultimately answerable to the Central Committee of the Chinese Communist Party for the purpose of formulating policies related to military reform. The group is headed by Xi Jinping, General Secretary of the Chinese Communist Party and Chairman of the Central Military Commission.

The decision to introduce wide-ranging military reforms was discussed in the communique of the 3rd Plenum of the 18th Central Committee in 2013. The Leading Group held its first meeting on March 15, 2014.

== Membership ==
Leader
Xi Jinping (General Secretary of the CCP Central Committee, Chairman of the Central Military Commission)

Executive Deputy Leader
Air Force General Xu Qiliang (Politburo member, Vice Chairman of the Central Military Commission)

Deputy Leader
General Zhang Youxia (Politburo member, Vice Chairman of the Central Military Commission)

== See also ==
- People's Republic of China military reform
