= Central Leading Group for Inspection Work =

Disciplinary organization of the Chinese Communist Party

- 中央巡视工作领导小组
- Emblem of the Chinese Communist Party

Agency overview
- Formed: November 2009; 16 years ago
- Type: Leading small group
- Jurisdiction: Chinese Communist Party
- Headquarters: Beijing
- Agency executives: Li Xi, Leader; Li Ganjie, Deputy Leader; Liu Jinguo, Deputy Leader; Wang Hongjin, Office Director
- Parent agency: Central Committee; Central Commission for Discipline Inspection
- Child agencies: General Office; Various Inspection Teams

Central Leading Group for Inspection Work
- Simplified Chinese: 中央巡视工作领导小组
Transcriptions
Standard Mandarin
- Hanyu Pinyin: Zhōngyāng Xúnshì Gōngzuò Lǐngdǎo Xiǎozǔ

The Central Leading Group for Inspection Work is a coordination body set up under the Central Committee of the Chinese Communist Party for the purpose of managing party disciplinary inspections nationwide.

== History ==
Inspection work began in the early 1990s and was a collaboration between the Organization Department and the Central Commission for Discipline Inspection, the party's anti-graft body. The decision to formally establish the leading group was announced in November 2009 by the Central Committee of the Chinese Communist Party.

The group gained special prominence since 2013 under the leadership of Wang Qishan as a result of the wide-reaching anti-corruption campaign following the 18th Party Congress. Under Wang Qishan, inspection teams have been sent out in several 'rounds', with each round numbering about a dozen inspection teams who 'embed' themselves as part of a regional or central organization for weeks to conduct inspection work on party disciplinary enforcement. Several prominent cases, such as that of Hubei Vice-Governor Guo Youming, Inner Mongolia politician Wang Suyi, Guangzhou CCP Committee Secretary Wan Qingliang, and a whole host of officials from Shanxi province, were initiated by the central inspection teams.

== Functions ==
The Leading Group and its General Office is tasked with dispatching "inspection teams" (xunshizu, 巡视组) to CCP bodies, provinces, central government organs such as ministries, and state-owned enterprises. The Leading Groups is headed by the secretary of the Central Commission for Discipline Inspection, with the Head of the CCP Organization Department and the Director of the National Supervisory Commission usually serving as deputy heads. The daily affairs of the Leading Group is handled by its General Office, which is located at the CCDI. Each provincial-level CCP committee has its own Leading Group for Inspection Work, headed by the secretary of the provincial Commission for Discipline Inspection.

== Membership ==
=== 20th Central Committee ===
- Leader
  - Li Xi, Politburo Standing Committee, Secretary of the Central Commission for Discipline Inspection
- Deputy Leaders
  - Li Ganjie, Head of the Party Organization Department
  - Liu Jinguo, Director of the National Supervisory Commission
- Director of the General Office
  - Wang Hongjin

=== 19th Central Committee ===
- Leader
  - Zhao Leji, Politburo Standing Committee, Secretary of the Central Commission for Discipline Inspection

=== 18th Central Committee ===
- Leader
  - Wang Qishan, Politburo Standing Committee, Secretary of the Central Commission for Discipline Inspection
- Deputy Leaders
  - Zhao Leji, Politburo, Head of the Party Organization Department
  - Zhao Hongzhu, Secretary of the Central Secretariat, Deputy Secretary of the Central Commission for Discipline Inspection
- Director of the General Office
  - Wang Hongjin (王鸿津)
- Members
  - Cui Shaopeng, Secretary-General of the Central Commission for Discipline Inspection
  - Huang Shuxian, Minister of Supervision
  - Chen Xi, deputy head of the Organization Department
  - Zhang Jun, Deputy Secretary of the Central Commission for Discipline Inspection
  - Wang Ersheng, deputy head of the Organization Department
  - Li Xiaohong
  - Zhou Zuyi (周祖翼), member of the Organization Department
