= Central Leading Group for Taiwan Affairs =

Chinese Communist Party body

- 中央对台工作领导小组
- Emblem of the Chinese Communist Party

Agency overview
- Formed: 1979; 47 years ago
- Type: Leading small group
- Jurisdiction: Chinese Communist Party
- Headquarters: Beijing
- Agency executives: Xi Jinping, Leader; Wang Huning, Deputy Leader; Wang Yi, Secretary-General; Song Tao, Office Director
- Parent agency: Central Committee of the Chinese Communist Party
- Child agency: Taiwan Affairs Office

Central Leading Group for Taiwan Affairs
- Simplified Chinese: 中央对台工作领导小组
Transcriptions
Standard Mandarin
- Hanyu Pinyin: Zhōngyāng Duìtái Gōngzuò Lǐngdǎo Xiǎozǔ

The Central Leading Group for Taiwan Affairs is an internal policy coordination group of the Central Committee of the Chinese Communist Party, reporting to the Politburo of the Chinese Communist Party, in charge of supervising and coordinating China's policy of unification towards Taiwan. It was established in 1979 and has been led by the General Secretary of the Chinese Communist Party since 1989.

== History ==
The first CCP decision-making body related to Taiwan was established in July 1954 by the CCP Central Committee based on Mao Zedong's suggestion, named the Central Leading Group for Taiwan Affairs. Additionally, Premier Zhou Enlai was put in charge of Taiwan-related work.

The work of the group was, along with almost all other leading groups, suspended during the Cultural Revolution. After the end of the Cultural Revolution, the Central Leading Group was restored in December 1979.

== Functions ==
The group is the top policy body of the CCP in affairs related to Taiwan. Since the PRC considers Taiwan part of its own territory, the group is outside China's foreign affairs system. The group's executive arm is the Office of the Central Leading Group for Taiwan Affairs, which has the external name of the Taiwan Affairs Office of the State Council under the "one institution with two names" system.

== Membership ==
The group has been led by the CCP general secretary since 1989. Additionally, the chairman of the National Committee of the Chinese People's Political Consultative Conference has been its deputy leader, while the director of the Office of the Central Foreign Affairs Commission has been its secretary-general. Other members have included a vice premier, a vice chairman of the Central Military Commission, heads of the CCP General Office, Central Propaganda Department, and the United Front Work Department, the Minister of Foreign Affairs, the Minister of Commerce, the Minister of State Security, and the director of the Taiwan Affairs Office.

=== Leadership ===
1. Deng Yingchao (1979–1987)
2. Yang Shangkun (1987–1989)
3. Jiang Zemin (1989–2004)
4. Hu Jintao (2004–2012)
5. Xi Jinping (2012–present)

=== Current composition ===
Leader

- Xi Jinping, General Secretary of the Chinese Communist Party, President of China

Deputy Leader

- Wang Huning, Chairman of the Chinese People's Political Consultative Conference

Chief of General Office

- Song Tao

Secretary-General

- Wang Yi

Members
Unknown

== See also ==
- Central Leading Group on Hong Kong and Macau Affairs
- United front in Taiwan
