= Organization of the Chinese Communist Party =

Political party organization

The organization of the Chinese Communist Party (CCP) is based upon the Leninist concept of democratic centralism.

== Mechanisms and regulations ==
In May 2013, the Central Committee of the Chinese Communist Party issued a resolution on which bodies were empowered to draft, approve, publish, amend and abolish party regulations, making it the first party document since 1921 (when the party was founded) on how to regulate party life. Gu Su, a constitutional law professor from Nanjing University, believed it was "a significant step by the new leadership to introduce rule of law into the management of party members amid a legitimacy crisis due to widespread abuse of power and corruption".

=== Inner-party democracy ===
==== History ====
It has been the party's policy since the 8th Central Committee (1956–1969) to democratize the CCP, and by 1994 the goal was to promote people's democracy by developing inner-party democracy. The meaning of democracy in CCP parlance has its basis in Vladimir Lenin's concept of democratic centralism. From its establishment in 1921 to it seizing power in 1949, the CCP was in effect continuously at war, and the centralizing element of democratic centralism became the basis on how the party was ruled. However, with its rise to power, members began to demand the democratization of the party. The 8th Central Committee, elected by the 8th National Congress, promulgated an 8-point resolution in 1956;

First, the CCP must without exception implement the principle of collective leadership and expand internal party democracy. Second, the principle of democratic centralism was defined as democracy under the guidance (rather than under the leadership) of centralism and the essence of democratic centralism is democracy rather than centralism. Third, all the business of the 8th Central Committee was made public. Fourth, there should be no idolatry. Fifth, the CCP should have regular deputies to Party congresses. Sixth, a strict and effective supervision mechanism within the CCP should be established. Seventh, the CCP should explore fixed terms of appointment (rather than lifelong terms). Eighth, the CCP should protect and expand the democratic rights of members."

However, these points were not implemented under Mao Zedong, in most parts because of the Cultural Revolution in which the CCP returned to the norm of issuing policy on the basis of centralism. However, with the end of the Cultural Revolution and the death of Mao Zedong, the party began looking in on itself, reflecting on the ills which had manifested themselves under its guidance. The 3rd Plenary Session of the 11th Central Committee was the first to dwell on these issues. In 1980, Deng Xiaoping published "On the Reform of the System of Party and State Leadership", in which he criticized the party's emphasis on unified leadership which, he believed, had led to power concentration in the hands of a few persons. In practice this was made even worse because executive committees at all levels concentrated all power, and this power was then re-concentrated in the hands of the head or heads of the committee. He then concluded that because of the unified leadership system thought, most decisions were taken by all-powerful individuals (more often than not first secretaries) rather than by the party. The 6th Plenary Session of the 11th Central Committee endorsed these views. This stance was mentioned again in the Political Report to the 13th National Congress (held in 1987), in which it was stated that developing democracy within the party was a feasible project to develop socialism. The 14th Plenary Session of the 14th Central Committee became the CCP's first endorsement of developing intra-party democracy so as to develop people's democracy. This line has continued to this day. The Political Report to the 16th National Congress stated that strengthening the democratic character of the party was a "life and death issue" for the party (without more democracy the CCP would face the same fate as the Communist Party of the Soviet Union, CPSU). The party has made it clear, with announcements from both party and state organs, that the policy of strengthening the party's democratic character will continue.

=== Age limits and term limits ===
In the early 1980s, Deng Xiaoping enacted unofficial term and age limits, intending to prevent the problems of the kind which arose in the late Mao Zedong era. The party's term limits reflect the implicit assumption that if a person remains in office too long, they lose touch with the people. Positions at the level of the Politburo Standing Committee have term limits.

Below the Politburo Standing Committee, positions have age limits rather than term limits. Age limits nonetheless operate as de facto term limits. The age limit for a minister-level appointment is retirement at age 65, and a person older than 58 will not be viewed as an eligible candidate. Department directors have an age limit of 60. A vice premier must be under 68 when appointed and must retire by 72.

== National Congress ==
The National Congress is the party's supreme organ, and is held every fifth year (in the past there were long intervals between congresses, but since the 9th National Congress in 1969, congresses have been held regularly). According to the party's constitution, a congress may not be postponed except "under extraordinary circumstances". A congress may be held before the given date if the Central Committee so decides, or if "one third of the party organizations at the provincial level so request". Under Mao, the delegates to congresses were appointed; however, since 1982 the congress delegates have been elected, due to the decision that there must be more candidates than seats. At the 15th National Congress in 1997, for instance, several princelings (the sons or daughters of powerful CCP officials) failed to be elected to the 15th Central Committee; among them were Chen Yuan, Wang Jun and Bo Xilai. The elections are carried out through secret ballots. Despite this, certain seats are not subject to elections; instead, the outgoing Central Committee "recommends" certain choices to the party electorate. These figures are mostly high-ranking members of the party leadership or special guests. For instance, at the 15th National Congress, 60 seats were given to members who had joined the CCP before 1927, and some were given to the outgoing members of the 15th Central Commission for Discipline Inspection (CCDI) and the 15th Central Committee.

The party constitution gives the National Congress six responsibilities: (1) electing the party's Central Committee; (2) electing the CCDI; (3) to examining the report of the outgoing Central Committee; (4) examining the report of the outgoing CCDI; (5) discussing and enacting party policies; and (6) revising the party's constitution. However, the delegates rarely discuss issues in length at the National Congresses; most discussion takes place before the congress, in the preparation period.

=== Constitution ===
According to the CCP-published book Concise History of the Communist Party of China, the party's first constitution was adopted at the 1st National Congress. Since then several constitutions have been written, such as the second constitution, adopted at the 7th National Congress. The constitution regulates party life, and the CCDI is responsible for supervising the party to ensure that it is followed. The constitution currently in force was adopted in 1982 at the 12th National Congress. It has many affinities with the 1982 state constitution, and they are generally amended either at party congresses or shortly thereafter. The preamble of the state constitution is largely copied from the "General Program" (the preamble) of the party constitution.

=== Central Committee ===
The Central Committee is empowered by the party constitution to enact policies in the periods between party congresses. A Central Committee is de jure elected by a party Congress, but in reality its membership is chosen by the central party leadership. The authority of the Central Committee has increased in recent years, with the leaders rarely, if ever, going against Central Committee, which often occurred during the early years of the People's Republic. The Central Committee is required to meet at least once every year; however, in the early years of the People's Republic there were several years when it did not convene at all; 1951–53, 1960, 1963–65, 1967, 1971, 1974 and 1976.

While the Central Committee is the highest organ in the periods between party congresses, few resolutions cite its name. Instead, the majority of party resolutions refer to the "Party Centre" (Dangzhongyang), an indirect way of protecting the powers of, and resolutions produced by, the Politburo, the Politburo Standing Committee and the General Secretary. This method shields the central party leadership from lower-level bodies, reducing accountability, as lower levels can never be sure which body produced which resolution. In contrast to the Central Committee of the Communist Party of Vietnam (CPV), the CCP Central Committee does not have the power to remove general secretaries or other leading officials, despite the fact that the party constitution grants it those rights. When the CPV dismissed its General Secretary Do Muoi, it convened a special session of its Central Committee, and when it chose its new general secretary, it convened another Central Committee plenum. In contrast, in China, when the CCP dismissed Hu Yaobang (in 1987) and Zhao Ziyang in 1989, the Politburo, not the Central Committee, convened a special session. Not only did the meeting itself break constitutional practices, since the CCP constitution clearly states that a Central Committee session must be called, but the meeting included several party veterans who were neither formal members of the Politburo nor of the Central Committee. In short, the CCP Central Committee, in contrast to the CPV Central Committee, is responsible to the higher bodies of the party (the Politburo and the Politburo Standing Committee), while in Vietnam the higher bodies are accountable to the Central Committee.

=== Central Commission for Discipline Inspection ===
The Central Commission for Discipline Inspection (CCDI) is responsible for monitoring and punishing CCP cadres who abuse power, are corrupt or in general commit wrongdoing. CCDI organs exist at every level of the party hierarchy. The CCDI is the successor to the Control Commission, abolished in 1968 at the height of the Cultural Revolution. Although the CCDI was originally designed to restore party morale and discipline, it has taken over many of the functions of the former Control Commission. The CCDI is elected by the National Congress, held every fifth year.

== Bodies of the Central Committee ==
=== General Secretary ===
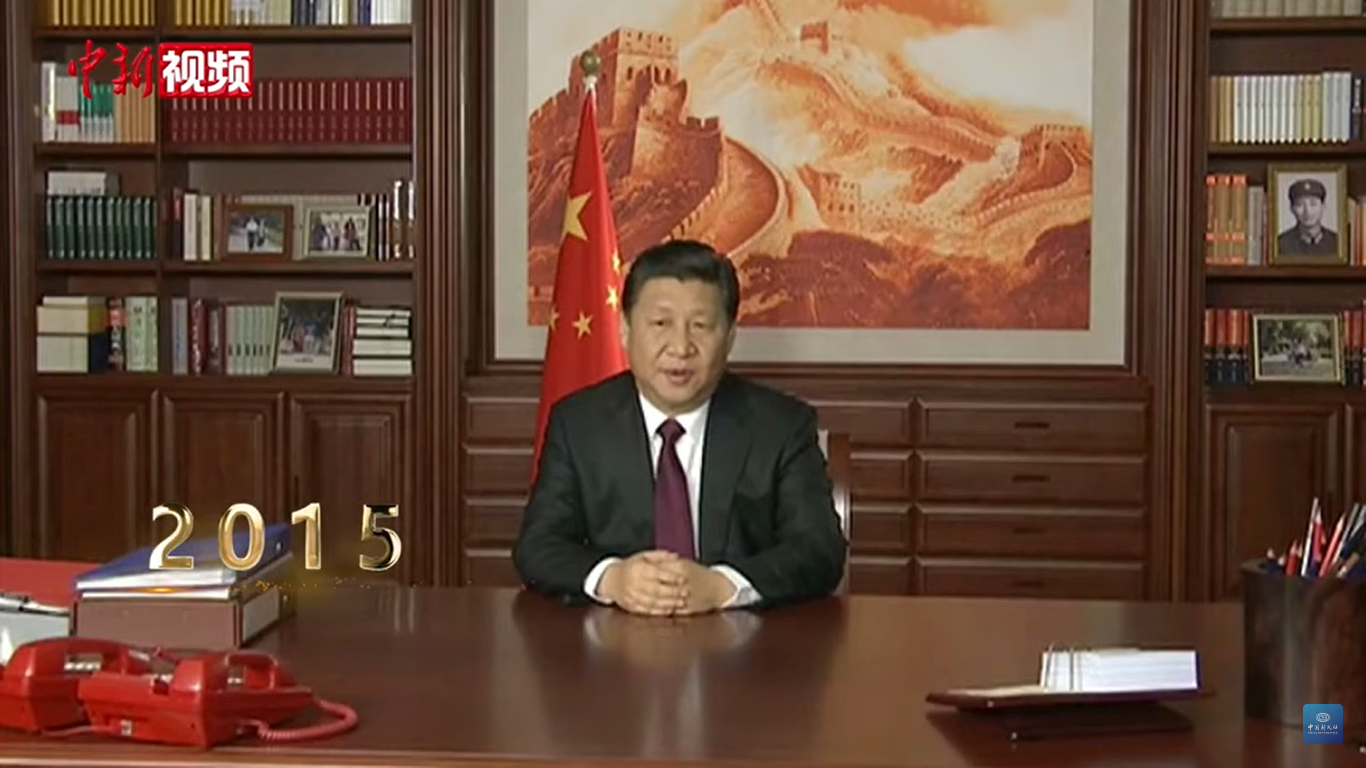
CCP General Secretary Xi Jinping in his office

At the party's founding in 1921, Chen Duxiu was elected as the party leader, holding the position of Secretary of the Central Bureau. As the party expanded, the title changed several times over the next 3 years, until in 1925 the title General Secretary was introduced. The term General Secretary continued in general use until 1943, when Mao Zedong was elected as Chairman of the Politburo. In 1945, Mao was elected Chairman of the CCP Central Committee, the title he held for the rest of his life. The office of General Secretary was revived in 1956 at the 8th National Congress, to replace the office of CCP Secretary-General, but it functioned as a lesser office, responsible to the office of the CCP Chairman. At a party meeting in 1959, Mao explained the relationship between the CCP Chairman and the CCP General Secretary as follows: "As Chairman, I am the commander; as General Secretary, Deng Xiaoping is deputy commander."

The office of CCP Chairman was abolished in 1982, and replaced with that of CCP General Secretary. According to the party constitution, the General Secretary must be a member of the Politburo Standing Committee (PSC), and is responsible for convening meetings of the PSC and the Politburo, while also presiding over the work of the Secretariat.

The party's leader holds the offices of General Secretary (responsible for civilian party duties), Chairman of the Central Military Commission (responsible for military affairs) and state president (a largely ceremonial position); in the recent past, the party leader has first been elected General Secretary and then later been appointed to the other two offices. Through these posts the party leader is the country's paramount leader.

=== Politburo ===
The Politburo of the Central Committee "exercises the functions and powers of the Central Committee when a plenum is not in session". It is formally elected at the first plenary meeting of each newly elected Central Committee. In reality, however, Politburo membership is decided by the central party leadership. During his rule, Mao controlled the composition of the Politburo himself. The Politburo was de facto the highest organ of power until the 8th National Congress, when the PSC was established. The powers given to the PSC came at the expense of the Politburo. The Politburo meets at least once a month. The CCP General Secretary is responsible for convening the Politburo.

Since 2003, the Politburo has delivered a work report to every Central Committee plenum, further cementing the Politburo's status as accountable to the Central Committee. Also, from the 16th National Congress onwards, the CCP has reported on meetings of the Politburo, the PSC and its study sessions. However, the reports do not contain all the information discussed at the meetings; the end of the reports usually notes that "other matters" were also discussed at the meeting.

In the Politburo, decisions are reached through consensus, not through votes. In certain cases, straw votes are used to see how many members support or oppose a certain case (these straw votes do not necessarily affect the ultimate decision). Every member has the right to participate in the collective discussion. The CCP General Secretary convenes the Politburo and sets the agenda for the meeting. Each Politburo member is told of the agenda beforehand and is delivered briefing materials by the General Secretary on the agenda matters. The first person to speak at the meeting is the member who proposed the agenda. After that, those who know about the subject, or whose work is directly related to it, may speak. Then those who doubt or oppose the agenda proposal speak. Lastly, the General Secretary speaks and usually supports the agenda proposal, as he supported tabling it for discussion in the first place. When the General Secretary is finished speaking, he calls for a vote. If the vote is unanimous or nearly so, it may be accepted; if the vote is nearly unanimous, but members who directly work in the area discussed oppose it, the issue will be postponed. When the Politburo enacts a decision without all the members' agreement, the other members usually try to convince their opponents. In many ways, the CCP Politburo's policy decision-making is very similar to that of the Politburo of the Communist Party of the Soviet Union after Nikita Khrushchev's removal.

==== Politburo Standing Committee ====
The Politburo Standing Committee (PSC) is the highest organ of the Communist Party when neither the Politburo, the Central Committee, nor the National Congress are in session. It convenes at least once a week. It was established at the 8th National Congress, in 1958, to take over the policy-making role formerly assumed by the Secretariat. The PSC is the highest decision-making body of the Communist Party, though since Hu Jintao's term as General Secretary there is some evidence to suggest a greater role for the collective consultation of the entire Politburo. Despite formal rules stating that a PSC member must serve a term in the Politburo before advancing to the PSC, this rule has been breached twice, first in 1992 when Hu Jintao was appointed to PSC, and again in 2007 when Xi Jinping and Li Keqiang were appointed to it.

Even though the PSC is officially said to be accountable to the Central Committee, in practice, the PSC supersedes the Central Committee and is superior to it. For example, there is no known instance for which the Central Committee has reversed a decision by the PSC. Moreover, many important decisions in party history were made by the PSC alone, such as the decision to invoke martial law during the 1989 Tiananmen Square protests and massacre. The membership of the PSC has historically varied between 5 and 11 members, and usually consist an odd number of people to avoid tie-breaking votes. The way by which membership has been determined has varied widely throughout history, from direct personal appointment by the party leader to extremely lengthy consultations with retired and existing party leaders.

=== Secretariat ===
The Secretariat of the Central Committee is headed by the General Secretary and is responsible for supervising the central party organizations: departments, commissions, newspapers, etc. It is also responsible for implementing the decisions of the Politburo and the Politburo Standing Committee. The Secretariat was abolished in 1966 and its formal functions taken over by the Central Office of Management, but it was reestablished in 1980. To be appointed to the Secretariat, a person has to be nominated by the Politburo Standing Committee; the nomination must be approved by the Central Committee.

=== Central Military Commission ===
The Central Military Commission (CMC) is elected by the Central Committee, and is responsible for the PLA. The position of CMC Chairman is one of the most powerful in China, and the CMC Chairman must concurrently serve as CCP General Secretary. Unlike the collective leadership ideal of other party organs, the CMC Chairman acts as commander-in-chief with the right to appoint or dismiss top military officers as he pleases. The CMC Chairman can deploy troops, controls the country's nuclear weapons, and allocates the budget. The promotion or transfer of officers above the divisional level must be validated by the CMC Chairman's signature.

In theory, the CMC Chairman is under the responsibility of the Central Committee, but in practice, he reports only to the paramount leader. This is in many ways due to Mao, who did not want other Politburo members to involve themselves in military affairs. As he put it, "the Politburo's realm is state affairs, the CMC's is military". This state of things has continued until today. The CMC has controlled the PLA through three organs since 1937: the General Staff Department, the General Political Department and the General Logistics Department. A fourth organ, the General Armaments Department, was established in 1998. These four departments were abolished after the military reforms in 2016, replaced with 15 departments that report directly to the CMC.

=== General Office ===
The General Office of the Central Committee is commonly known as the nerve center of the CCP. It acts as the primary day-to-day administrative body of the Central Committee, responsible for communication and drafting party documents. For instance, it handles classified documents and information from party organs nationwide. It additionally oversees the Central Security Bureau (CSB), responsible for the security of top party leaders.

=== Functional Departments ===
A Functional Department (职能部门) is a body of the CCP that is tasked with a certain aspect of work by the Central Committee. There are currently six departments:

- Central Organization Department (COD) — Established in 1921, functioning like the Organizational Bureau (Orgburo) of the Communist Party of the Soviet Union (CPSU). At the beginning, the COD was principally occupied with creating files on the party's members, to see if they were committed communists or not. According to analyst Richard McGregor, "The Central Organisation Department is [the CCP's] third and least-known pillar of power". The COD is responsible for personnel appointments throughout the CCP.
- Central Publicity Department (CPD) — Controls news and information to the Chinese public. It functions to protect the interest of the CCP on the basis of the party line and the ideological concept of the Four Cardinal Principles.
- United Front Work Department (UFWD) — Responsible for increasing the party's support base outside its direct purview, in the business community and civil organizations, including eight officially recognized non-Communist political parties.
- International Liaison Department (ILD) — The CCP's "foreign affairs ministry", responsible for relations with foreign parties as well as for gathering foreign intelligence. During the Cold War, the ILD fought for domination in the global communist movement against the CPSU's International Department, but with the collapse of the Soviet Union and the Eastern Bloc, its responsibilities have widened to include foreign relations with all types of parties: communists, socialists, liberals, etc.
- Society Work Department (SWD) — Established in 2023, the department oversees "society work".
- Central Political and Legal Affairs Commission (CPLC) — Oversees political and legal affairs. Additionally, it oversees the legal enforcement system in the country.

=== Coordination Organizations ===
These commissions are tasked with policy formulation and implementation, led by high-ranking officials within the CCP.

- Central Comprehensively Deepening Reforms Commission
- Central Cyberspace Affairs Commission
- Central Financial and Economic Affairs Commission
- Central Financial Work Commission
- Central Financial Commission
- Central Foreign Affairs Commission
- Central Guidance Commission on Building Spiritual Civilization — Responsible for party ideology.
- Central Institutional Organization Commission
- Central Integrated Military and Civilian Development Commission
- Central National Security Commission — The Central National Security Commission (CNSC) was established at the 3rd Plenary Session of the 18th Central Committee (held in 2013). It has been established to "co-ordinate security strategies across various departments, including intelligence, the military, foreign affairs and the police in order to cope with growing challenges to stability at home and abroad."

=== Administrative Organizations ===
Offices of commissions and leading groups handle the daily affairs of the parent bodies. There are officially ten administrative organizations (办事机构) under the Central Committee.

- Central Policy Research Office (CPRO) — Responsible for researching issues of significant interest to the central party leadership.
- Central Hong Kong and Macau Work Office —The general office of the Central Leading Group on Hong Kong and Macau Affairs. Externally known as the Hong Kong and Macau Affairs Office of the State Council.
- Central Taiwan Work Office (CTWO) —The general office of the Central Leading Group for Taiwan Affairs (CLGTA), responsible for preparing agendas for its meetings, coordinating paper flow and communicating with other organs on the CLGTA's behalf. Externally known as the Taiwan Affairs Office of the State Council.
- Office of the Central Cyberspace Affairs Commission — Externally known as the Cyberspace Administration of China.
- Office of the Central Integrated Military and Civilian Development Commission
- Office of the Central National Security Commission
- Office of the Central Financial Commission
- Office of the Central Financial and Economic Affairs Commission
- Office of the Central Foreign Affairs Commission
- Office of the Central Institutional Organization Commission

=== Leading Small Groups ===
A Leading Small Group (领导小组; lǐngdǎo xiǎozǔ), also translated as a "Central Leading Group", is an ad hoc body of the Chinese state charged with decision-making on major functional issue areas. They operate effectively as interagency executive committees, cutting across the government, party, and military systems. Major LSGs cover issues such as national security, foreign affairs, Taiwan affairs, Hong Kong and Macao, propaganda and ideology, and financial and economic matters. Some of the LSGs include:

- Central Leading Group for Inspection Work
- Central Leading Group for Military Reform
- Central Leading Group for Propaganda, Ideology and Culture
- Central Leading Group for Taiwan Affairs
- Central Leading Group on Hong Kong and Macau Affairs

=== Institutions directly under the Central Committee ===
- Central Party School (CPI) — Provides political training and ideological indoctrination in communist thought for high-ranking CCP cadres and rising CCP cadres. It publishes the theoretical magazines Seeking Truth from Facts and Study Times.
- Institute of Party History and Literature — Established in 2016 to study ideology, edit and comple important documents of Marxist classical writers and works of major leaders, and collect and sort out important documents of the party history.
- People's Daily Press — Publishes People's Daily, one of the most recognized Chinese media outlets, the newspaper functions as the print media of first instance for the central party leadership in its communication with the general public.
- Qiushi Press — Publishes Qiushi, the official theoretical journal of the CCP.
- Guangming Daily Press — Publishes Guangming Daily, one of China's largest media outlets.
- China Executive Leadership Academy in Pudong — Cadre school located in Pudong, Shanghai
- China Executive Leadership Academy in Jinggangshan — Cadre school located in Jinggangshan, Ji'an, Jiangxi.
- China Executive Leadership Academy in Yan'an — Cadre school located in Yan'an, Shaanxi
- Central Institute of Socialism — A united front political school operated by the CCP.

== Lower-level organizations ==
CCP committees exist at the level of provinces; autonomous regions; municipalities directly under the central government; cities divided into districts; autonomous prefectures; counties (banner); autonomous counties; cities not divided into districts; and municipal districts. Party committees also exist at the neighborhood level and even within landlord and property management organizations. These committees are elected by party congresses (at their own level). Local party congresses are supposed to be held every fifth year, but under extraordinary circumstances they may be held earlier or postponed. However that decision must be approved by the next higher level of the local party committee. The number of delegates and the procedures for their election are decided by the local party committee, but must also have the approval of the next higher party committee.

As of December 2024, there are 3,200 local CCP committees at all levels across China, including 31 province-level committees, 397 municipal (prefectural) committees, and 2,772 county (city, district, banner) committees. There are Party organizations in 9,160 urban streets, 29,607 towns, 121,270 communities, and 486,326 administrative villages. Additionally, there are 800,000 grassroots party organizations in government agencies, 1,001,000 grassroots party organizations in public institutions, 1,600,000 grassroots party organizations in enterprises and 183,000 grassroots party organizations in social organizations in China.

=== Private sector ===
Party organizations are tasked by the CCP with implementing party principles and policies within the enterprise and ensuring compliance with state laws and regulations.

Under the 1993 PRC Company Law, all firms with three or more CCP members must establish a party committee. However, this requirement was lightly enforced until 2012 when the CCP began strengthening party committee in private companies.

Under Xi Jinping, CCP committees have become increasingly prevalent in the private sector, in both Chinese companies as well as foreign owned companies. In 2018, the percentage of private businesses with these Party branches reached 48.3%; only 27.4% of private businesses had a party committee in 2002. 92% of the largest Chinese companies have CCP committees.

In September 2020, the CCP announced that it would strengthen united front work in the private sector by establishing more party committees in regional federations of industry and commerce (FIC), and by arranging a special liaison between FICs and the CCP.

In July 2022, HSBC became the first foreign lender to open a CCP committee in its Chinese investment banking subsidiary, HSBC Qianhai Securities.

In addition to increasing the number of Party organizations, the CCP has concurrently attempted to raise its influence over management decisions since 2012. This effort includes integrating party members into company management and decision-making processes. This expansion is altering traditional understandings of corporate autonomy and governance. CCP committees exist outside traditional corporate governance structures.

Furthermore, the CCP is pushing for a "modern enterprise system with Chinese characteristics" that involves inserting Party building provisions directly into corporate charters. These provisions give the internal party organization a say in management decisions and ensure key CCP members hold positions in company management or on the board. This system was initially applied to state-owned enterprises (SOEs) but is now extending to private enterprises.

The CCP's efforts to promote Party organizations in the private sector have led to concerns from foreign entities. European trade groups resisted attempts by their SOE joint venture partners to incorporate Party organizations into company charters in 2017. In May 2018, the US-China Business Council reported that some SOE joint ventures requested foreign partners to amend their articles of association to support CCP groups and even allow party organizations to approve critical matters before presenting them to the board. A 2018 analysis by the European Commission highlighted the potential significant influence of party organizations in both SOEs and private companies, enabling the CCP to directly impact business decisions.

== Members ==
=== Probationary period, rights and duties ===
It is my will to join the Communist Party of China, uphold the Party's program, observe the provisions of the Party constitution, fulfill a Party member's duties, carry out the Party's decisions, strictly observe Party discipline, guard Party secrets, be loyal to the Party, work hard, fight for communism throughout my life, be ready at all times to sacrifice my all for the Party and the people, and never betray the Party.

— Communist Party admission oath.

To join the party an applicant must be 18 years of age, and must spend a year as a probationary member. In contrast to the past, when emphasis was placed on the applicants' ideological criteria, the current CCP stresses technical and educational qualifications. However, applicants and members are expected to be both "red and expert". To become a probationary member, two current CCP members must recommend the applicant to the local party leadership. The recommending members must acquaint themselves with the applicants, and be aware of the "applicant's ideology, character, personnel records and work performance" while teaching them about the party's program and constitution, as well as the duties and responsibilities of members. To this end, the recommending members must write a report to the local party leadership, reporting their opinion that the applicant is either qualified or unqualified for membership. To become a probationary member, the applicant must take an admission oath before the party flag. The relevant CCP organization is responsible for observing and educating probationary members. Probationary members have duties similar to those of full members, with the exception that they may not vote in party elections nor stand for election.

Before 1949, joining the CCP was a matter of personal commitment to the communist cause. After 1949, people joined to gain good government jobs or access to universities, which were then limited to CCP members. Many joined the CCP through the Communist Youth League. Under Jiang Zemin, private entrepreneurs were allowed to become party members.

CCP membership additionally comes with several responsibilities. CCP members are required to give between 0.5% and 2% of their monthly salary as membership fee, which goes to the party funds. Members must pay dues regardless of location. They additionally need to regularly attend party meetings and basic organizational cell activities. In 2019, the CCP Central Committee issued a rule requiring members abroad to contact CCP cells at home at least once every six months. Failure to pay dues for six consecutive months is grounds for expulsion, according to party regulations.

=== Demographics ===
As of December 2024, individuals who identify as farmers, herdsmen and fishermen make up 26.1 million members; members identifying as workers totalled 6.6 million. Another group, the "Managing, professional and technical staff in enterprises and public institutions", made up 16.4 million, 11.6 million identified as working in administrative staff and 7.6 million described themselves as party cadres. By 2024, CCP membership had become more educated, younger, and less blue-collar than previously, with 57.6% of party members having a college degree or above. As of 2022, around 30 to 35 percent of Chinese entrepreneurs are or have been a party member. At the end of 2024, the CCP stated that it has approximately 7.73 million ethnic minority members or 7.7% of the party, while 30.99 million women were CCP members, representing 30.9% of the party.

== Communist Youth League ==
The Communist Youth League (CYL) is the CCP's youth wing, and the largest mass organization for youth in China. To join, an applicant has to be between the ages of 14 and 28. It controls and supervises Young Pioneers, a youth organization for children below the age of 14. The organizational structure of CYL is an exact copy of the CCP's; the highest body is the National Congress, followed by the Central Committee, Politburo and the Politburo Standing Committee. However, the Central Committee (and all central organs) of the CYL work under the guidance of the CCP central leadership. Therefore, in a peculiar situation, CYL bodies are both responsible to higher bodies within CYL and the CCP, a distinct organization. By the end of 2025, the CYLC had 78.336 million members and 5.15 million organizations throughout China.

== See also ==
- Cadre system of the Chinese Communist Party
