= 19th Secretariat of the Chinese Communist Party =

Chinese government body

The 19th Secretariat, formally the Secretariat of the 19th Central Committee of the Communist Party of China, was nominated by the 19th Politburo Standing Committee and approved by the 1st Plenary Session of the 19th Central Committee on 25 October 2017, in the aftermath of the 19th National Congress of the Chinese Communist Party (CCP). This electoral term was preceded by the 18th Secretariat, and succeeded by the 20th in 2022.

== General Secretary of the Central Committee ==
General Secretary of the 19th Central Committee
Portrait	Name	Hanzi	Birth	PM	Ethnicity	Ref.
Xi Jinping	Xi Jinping	习近平	1953	1974	Han	

== Composition ==
Members of the Secretariat of the 19th Central Committee
Rank	Name	Hanzi	18th SEC	20th SEC	Birth	PM	Birthplace	Academic attainment	No. of offices	Ref.
1	Wang Huning	王沪宁	Comeback	Not	1955	1984	Shanghai	Graduate: Master's degree in Marxist legal studies; Graduate programme in international politics; Undergraduate degree in French	Two: Party office; First-ranked Secretary, Secretariat of the Central Committee; Head, Central Policy Research Office of the Central Committee	
2	Ding Xuexiang	丁薛祥	New	Not	1962	1984	Jiangsu	Graduate: Master's degree in science and management; Bachelor's degree in engineering	Five: Party office; Head, General Office of the Central Committee; Head, Office of the General Secretary of the Central Committee; Head, General Office of the National Security Commission of the Central Committee; Head, Central Secrecy Commission of the Central Committee; Head, Central Health Commission of the Central Committee	
3	Yang Xiaodu	杨晓渡	New	Not	1953	1973	Shanghai	Graduate: Master's degree in Marxist legal studies	Four: Party office; Deputy Secretary, Standing Committee of the Central Commission for Discipline Inspection; Deputy Head, Central Leading Group for Inspection Work; Deputy Head, Central Leading Group for Deepening the Pilot Work of Reform of the National Supervision System; State offices; Director, National Supervisory Commission	
4	Chen Xi	陈希	New	Not	1953	1978	Fujian	Graduate: Master's degree in chemical engineering	Four: Party offices; President, Central Party School of the Central Committee; Head, Organisation Department of the Central Committee; Head, Central Talent Work Coordination Group of the Central Committee; State office; Dean, National Academy of Governance	
5	Guo Shengkun	郭声琨	New	Not	1954	1974	Jiangxi	Graduate: Doctoral degree in management science; Undergraduate degree in management engineering	Two: Party office; Secretary, Central Political and Legal Affairs Commission of the Central Committee; Head, Central Committee for Comprehensive Rule of Law of the Central Committee	
6	Huang Kunming	黄坤明	New	Not	1956	1976	Fujian	Graduate: Doctoral degree in management science; Undergraduate degree in economic management; Undergraduate degree in politics	Four: Party offices; Head, Publicity Department of the Central Committee; Head, Central Leading Group for the Reform and Development of the Cultural System of the Central Committee; Deputy Head, Central Guidance Commission on Building Spiritual Civilization of the Central Committee; Deputy Head, Central Leading Group for Propaganda, Ideology and Culture of the Central Committee	
7	You Quan	尤权	New	Not	1954	1973	Beijing	Graduate: Master's degree in national economic planning	Three: Party office; Head, United Front Work Department of the Central Committee; Deputy Head, Central United Front Work Leading Group of the Central Committee; Organisational office; President, Central Committee of the China Overseas Friendship Association	

== See also ==
- 19th Politburo Standing Committee of the Chinese Communist Party
- 19th Politburo of the Chinese Communist Party
- 19th Central Committee of the Chinese Communist Party
