= 18th Secretariat of the Chinese Communist Party =

Chinese government body

The 18th Secretariat, formally the Secretariat of the 18th Central Committee of the Communist Party of China, was nominated by the 18th Politburo Standing Committee and approved by the 1st Plenary Session of the 18th Central Committee on 15 November 2012, in the aftermath of the 18th National Congress of the Chinese Communist Party (CCP). This electoral term was preceded by the 17th Secretariat and succeeded by the 19th in 2017.

== General Secretary of the Central Committee ==
General Secretary of the 18th Central Committee
Portrait	Name	Hanzi	Birth	PM	Ref.
Xi Jinping	Xi Jinping	习近平	1953	1974	

== Composition ==
Members of the Secretariat of the 18th Central Committee
Rank	Name	Hanzi	17th SEC	19th SEC	Birth	PM	Birthplace	Academic attainment	Ethnicity	No. of offices	Ref.
1	Liu Yunshan	刘云山	Old	Not	1947	1971	Shanxi	Not made public: Was given a university education at the Central Party School	Han	Three: Party offices; President, Central Party School of the Central Committee; Chairman, Central Guidance Commission for Building Spiritual Civilization	
2	Liu Qibao	刘奇葆	New	Not	1953	1971	Anhui	Graduate: Master's degree in National economic planning and management; Undergraduate degree in history	Han	One: Party office; Head, Publicity Department of the Central Committee	
3	Zhao Leji	赵乐际	New	Not	1957	1975	Shandong	Graduate: Graduate programme in currency and banking; Undergraduate degree in philosophy	Han	One: Party office; Head, Organization Department of the Central Committee	
4	Li Zhanshu	栗战书	New	Not	1950	1975	Hebei	Graduate: Master's degree in business administration; Graduate programme in business economics; Undergraduate degree in politics	Han	One: Party office; Head, General Office of the Central Committee	
5	Du Qinglin	杜青林	New	Not	1946	1966	Jilin	Graduate: Doctoral degree in national economic planning and management	Han	Two: Party office; Secretary, Central Political and Legal Affairs Commission of the Central Committee; Head, Central Committee for Comprehensive Rule of Law of the Central Committee	
6	Zhao Hongzhu	赵洪祝	New	Not	1947	1969	Inner Mongolia	Not made public: Received a college education from the Central Party School	Han	Four: Party offices; Head, Publicity Department of the Central Committee; Head, Central Leading Group for the Reform and Development of the Cultural System of the Central Committee; Deputy Head, Central Guidance Commission on Building Spiritual Civilization of the Central Committee; Deputy Head, Central Leading Group for Propaganda, Ideology and Culture of the Central Committee	
7	Yang Jing	杨晶	New	Not	1953	1976	Suiyuan	Graduate: Received a postgraduate education from the Central Party School	Mongol	Three: Party office; Head, United Front Work Department of the Central Committee; Deputy Head, Central United Front Work Leading Group of the Central Committee; Organisational office; President, Central Committee of the China Overseas Friendship Association	

== See also ==
- 18th Politburo Standing Committee of the Chinese Communist Party
- 18th Politburo of the Chinese Communist Party
- 18th Central Committee of the Chinese Communist Party
