= 20th Secretariat of the Chinese Communist Party =

Chinese government body

The 20th Secretariat of the Chinese Communist Party, formally the Secretariat of the 20th Central Committee of the Communist Party of China, was nominated by the 20th Politburo Standing Committee and approved by the 1st Plenary Session of the 20th Central Committee on 23 October 2022, in the aftermath of the 20th National Congress of the Chinese Communist Party (CCP). It was preceded by the 19th Secretariat.

== General Secretary of the Central Committee ==
General Secretary of the 20th Central Committee
Portrait	Name	Hanzi	Birth	PM	Ref.
Xi Jinping	Xi Jinping	习近平	1953	1974	

== Composition ==
Members of the Secretariat of the 20th Central Committee
Rank	Name	Hanzi	19th SEC	Birth	PM	Birthplace	Academic attainment	No. of offices	Ref.
1	Cai Qi	蔡奇	New	1955	1975	Fujian	Graduate: Doctoral degree in political economy; Post-graduate degree in economic law; Undergraduate degree in political education	Four: Party offices; Head, General Office of the Central Committee; Head, Office of the General Secretary of the Central Committee; Head, Working Committee of Central and State Organs of the Central Committee; Head, Central Guidance Commission on Building Spiritual Civilization of the Central Committee	
2	Shi Taifeng	石泰峰	New	1956	1982	Shanxi	Graduate: Master's degree in law	Two: Party office; Head, United Front Work Department of the Central Committee; Organisational office; Vice Chairman of the National Committee of the Chinese People's Political Consultative Conference	
3	Li Ganjie	李干杰	New	1964	1984	Hunan	Graduate: Master's degree in nuclear reactor engineering	Two: Party office; Head, Organisation Department of the Central Committee	
4	Li Shulei	李书磊	New	1964	1986	Henan	Graduate: Master's degree in Chinese literature	Two: Party office; Head, Publicity Department of the Central Committee; Head, General Office of the Central Guidance Commission on Building Spiritual Civilization of the Central Committee	
5	Chen Wenqing	陈文清	New	1960	1983	Sichuan	Undergraduate: Undergraduate degree in law	One: Party office; Secretary, Central Political and Legal Affairs Commission of the Central Committee	
6	Liu Jinguo	刘金国	New	1955	1975	Hebei	Undergraduate: Received an unspecified undergraduate degree from the Central Party School	Two: Party office; Deputy Secretary, Standing Committee of the Central Commission for Discipline Inspection; State office; Director, National Supervisory Commission of the National People's Congress	
7	Wang Xiaohong	王小洪	New	1957	1982	Fujian	Undergraduate: Received an unspecified undergraduate degree from the Central Party School	Three: Party office; Secretary, Party Committee of the Ministry of Public Security; Secretary, Central Political and Legal Affairs Commission of the Central Committee; State office; Minister of Public Security	

== Working Organs ==
=== Department-level institutions ===
Institution	Officeholder	Hanzi	Took office	Left office	Length of tenure	Ref.
Central Commission for Discipline Inspection	Li Xi	李希	22 October 2022	Incumbent	3 years and 201 days	
Central Financial Commission	He Lifeng	何立峰	6 November 2023	Incumbent	2 years and 186 days	
Central Cyberspace Affairs Commission	Cai Qi	蔡奇	22 October 2022	Incumbent	3 years and 201 days	
Central Military Commission	Zhang Shengmin	张升民	23 October 2025	Incumbent	200 days	
Central Rural Work Leading Group	Liu Guozhong	刘国中	12 March 2023	Incumbent	3 years and 60 days	
Central International Liaison Department	Liu Jianchao	刘建超	22 October 2022	Incumbent	3 years and 201 days	
Central Organization Department	Chen Xi	陈希	22 October 2022	26 April 2023	186 days	
Central Organization Department	Li Ganjie	李干杰	26 April 2023	Incumbent	3 years and 15 days	
Central Policy Research Office	Jiang Jinquan	江金权	22 October 2022	Incumbent	3 years and 201 days	
Central Political and Legal Affairs Commission	Chen Wenqing	陈文清	28 October 2022	Incumbent	3 years and 195 days	
Central Publicity Department	Li Shulei	李书磊	26 October 2022	Incumbent	3 years and 197 days	
Central Science and Technology Commission	Ding Xuexiang	丁薛祥	25 June 2024	Incumbent	1 year and 320 days	
Central Taiwan Affairs Office	Liu Jieyi	刘结一	22 October 2022	28 December 2022	67 days	
Central Taiwan Affairs Office	Song Tao	宋涛	28 December 2022	Incumbent	3 years and 134 days	
General Office	Ding Xuexiang	丁薛祥	22 October 2022	20 March 2023	149 days	
General Office	Cai Qi	蔡奇	20 March 2023	Incumbent	3 years and 52 days	
General Office of the Central Financial and Economic Affairs Commission	Liu He	刘鹤	22 October 2022	1 April 2023	161 days	
General Office of the Central Financial and Economic Affairs Commission	He Lifeng	何立峰	30 October 2023	Incumbent	2 years and 193 days	
General Office of the Central Committee for Foreign Affairs	Yang Jiechi	杨洁篪	22 October 2022	1 January 2023	71 days	
General Office of the Central Committee for Foreign Affairs	Wang Yi	王毅	1 January 2023	Incumbent	3 years and 130 days	
General Office of the Central Institutional Organization Commission	Li Xiaoxin	李小新	22 October 2022	Incumbent	3 years and 201 days	
International Communications Office	Sun Yeli	孙业礼	17 January 2023	11 April 2024	1 year and 85 days	
International Communications Office	Mo Gaoyi	莫高义	11 April 2024	Incumbent	2 years, 30 days	
United Front Work Department	Shi Taifeng	石泰峰	27 October 2022	Incumbent	3 years and 196 days	
Working Committee of Central and State Organs	Ding Xuexiang	丁薛祥	22 October 2022	4 April 2023	164 days	
Working Committee of Central and State Organs	Cai Qi	蔡奇	4 April 2023	Incumbent	3 years and 37 days	

=== Directly subordinated institutions ===
Institution	Officeholder	Hanzi	Took office	Left office	Length of tenure	Ref.
Institute of Party History and Literature	Qu Qingshan	曲青山	22 October 2022	Incumbent	3 years and 201 days	
Central Party School	Chen Xi	陈希	22 October 2022	Incumbent	3 years and 201 days	
China Executive Leadership Academy, Jinggangshan	Chen Xi	陈希	22 October 2022	Incumbent	3 years and 201 days	
China Executive Leadership Academy, Pudong	Chen Xi	陈希	22 October 2022	Incumbent	3 years and 201 days	
China Executive Leadership Academy, Yan'an	Chen Xi	陈希	22 October 2022	Incumbent	3 years and 201 days	
Guangming Daily	Wang Huimin	王慧敏	22 October 2022	Incumbent	3 years and 201 days	
People's Daily	Tuo Zhen	庹震	22 October 2022	27 September 2024	1 year and 341 days	
People's Daily	Yu Shaoliang	于绍良	27 September 2024	Incumbent	1 year, 226 days	
Qiushi	Xia Weidong	夏伟东	22 October 2022	21 September 2023	334 days	
Qiushi	Chen Yangyong	陈扬勇	21 September 2023	Incumbent	2 years, 232 days	

== See also ==
- Politburo Standing Committee of the Chinese Communist Party
- Politburo of the Chinese Communist Party
- General secretaryship of Xi Jinping
