= 16th Secretariat of the Chinese Communist Party =

Chinese government body

The 16th Secretariat, formally the Secretariat of the 16th Central Committee of the Communist Party of China, was nominated by the 16th Politburo Standing Committee and approved by the 1st Plenary Session of the 16th Central Committee on 15 November 2002, in the aftermath of the 16th National Congress of the Chinese Communist Party (CCP). This electoral term was preceded by the 15th Secretariat and succeeded by the 17th in 2007.

== General Secretary of the Central Committee ==
General Secretary of the 16th Central Committee
Portrait	Name	Hanzi	Birth	PM	Ref.
	Hu Jintao	胡锦涛	1942	1964	

== Composition ==
Members of the Secretariat of the 16th Central Committee
Rank	Name	Hanzi	15th SEC	17th SEC	Birth	PM	Death	Birthplace	Academic attainment	No. of offices	Ref.
1	Zeng Qinghong	曾庆红	Old	Not	1939	1960	Alive	Jiangxi	Graduate: Master's degree in engineering	Two: Party office; President, Central Party School of the Central Committee; State office; Vice President of the People's Republic of China	
2	Liu Yunshan	刘云山	New	Reelected	1947	1971	Alive	Shanxi	Not made public: Was given a university education at the Central Party School	One: Party office; Head, Publicity Department of the Central Committee	
3	Zhou Yongkang	周永康	New	Not	1942	1964	Alive	Jiangsu	Graduate: Master's degree in geophysical survey and exploration	Two: State offices; State Councillor of the People's Republic of China; Minister of Public Security	
4	He Guoqiang	贺国强	New	Not	1943	1966	Alive	Hunan	Graduate: Master's degree in chemical engineering	One: Party office; Head, Organisation Department, Central Committee	
5	Wang Gang	王刚	New	Not	1942	1971	Alive	Jilin	Undergraduate: Undergraduate degree in philosophy	One: Party office; Head, General Office of the Central Committee	
6	Xu Caihou	徐才厚	New	Not	1943	1971	2015	Hebei	Not made public: Attained a degree in military engineering	Two: Military office; Vice Chairman, Central Military Commission; Head, General Political Department of the People's Liberation Army	
7	He Yong	何勇	New	Reelected	1940	1958	Alive	Hebei	Not made public: Attained a degree in mechanical engineering.	One: Party office; Deputy Secretary, Standing Committee of the Central Commission for Discipline Inspection	

== See also ==
- 16th Politburo Standing Committee of the Chinese Communist Party
- 16th Politburo of the Chinese Communist Party
- 16th Central Committee of the Chinese Communist Party
