= 17th Secretariat of the Chinese Communist Party =

Chinese government body

The 17th Secretariat, formally the Secretariat of the 17th Central Committee of the Communist Party of China, was nominated by the 17th Politburo Standing Committee and approved by the 1st Plenary Session of the 17th Central Committee on 22 October 2007, in the aftermath of the 17th National Congress of the Chinese Communist Party (CCP). This electoral term was preceded by the 16th Secretariat and succeeded by the 18th in 2012.

== General Secretary of the Central Committee ==
General Secretary of the 17th Central Committee
Portrait	Name	Hanzi	Birth	PM	Ref.
	Hu Jintao	胡锦涛	1942	1964	

== Composition ==
Members of the Secretariat of the 17th Central Committee
Rank	Name	Hanzi	16th SEC	18th SEC	Birth	PM	Birthplace	Academic attainment	No. of offices	Ref.
1	Xi Jinping	习近平	New	Not	1953	1974	Beijing	Graduate: Doctoral degree in Marxist legal studies; Undergraduate degree in chemical engineering	Three: Party offices; President, Central Party School of the Central Committee; Deputy Head, Central Institutional Organization Commission of the Central Committee; Military office; Vice Chairman, Central Military Commission; State offices; Vice President of the People's Republic of China	
2	Liu Yunshan	刘云山	Old	Reelected	1947	1971	Shanxi	Not made public: Was given a university education at the Central Party School	One: Party office; Head, Publicity Department of the Central Committee	
3	Li Yuanchao	李源潮	New	Not	1950	1978	Jiangsu	Graduate: Doctoral degree in Marxist legal studies; Master's degree in mathematics; Master's degree in management science; Graduate programme in scientific socialism	One: Party office; Head, Organisation Department of the Central Committee	
4	He Yong	何勇	Old	Not	1940	1958	Hebei	Not made public: Attained a degree in mechanical engineering.	One: Party office; Deputy Secretary, Standing Committee of the Central Commission for Discipline Inspection	
5	Ling Jihua	令计划	New	Not	1956	1976	Shanxi	Graduate: Master's degree in commercial management	Two: Party office; Head, General Office of the Central Committee; Head, United Front Work Department of the Central Committee	
6	Wang Huning	王沪宁	New	Not	1955	1984	Shanghai	Graduate: Master's degree in Marxist legal studies; Graduate programme in international politics; Undergraduate degree in French	One: Party office; Head, Central Policy Research Office of the Central Committee	

== See also ==
- 17th Politburo Standing Committee of the Chinese Communist Party
- 17th Politburo of the Chinese Communist Party
- 17th Central Committee of the Chinese Communist Party
