= Cadre system of the Chinese Communist Party =

CCP professional personnel system

The Chinese Communist Party (CCP) maintains a system to train, organize, appoint, and oversee personnel to fulfill a wide range of civil service roles in party, state, military, business, and other organizations across the People's Republic of China. The system is composed of the several million full-time, professional staff.

The People's Republic of China is a one-party state under the CCP. The management of cadres is one of the key ways in which the leadership of the CCP controls Chinese society and disciplines the state and the party itself. Personnel must keep allegiance to the CCP and not develop any competing loyalties. To this end, the CCP enforces tight restrictions on the freedom of cadres to affiliate themselves with any other organizations, movements, ideologies, or activities or to practice any form of religion (although this last rule is sometimes not fully applied or can be partly evaded under certain circumstances). Cadres are trained and developed to be not only competent and dependable administrators but also disciplined, morally upstanding and unwaveringly faithful to the party line and to the pursuit of socialism with Chinese characteristics.

== Definition ==
The word cadre most broadly refers to the staff that are tasked with the management of state and/or party affairs. Based on the Leninist concept of vanguardism, a cadre is a full-time, professional revolutionary dedicated to the goals of a communist party, who works at the discretion of its leadership. This stands in contrast to ordinary members not involved in the running of the party on a day-to-day basis. The term was first used by the Chinese Communist Party at the 2nd National Congress of the Chinese Communist Party in July 1922.

The term in Chinese today generally extends to any person in a position of certain authority or responsibility subject to CCP oversight, whether or not they are members of the party. Professor John P. Burns of the University of Hong Kong defines a cadre as "the managers, administrators and professionals found in all sectors of the economy including enterprises, in administrative bodies including government, and in public service units." The definition of the term has broadened significantly since the first decade of the People's Republic of China, spanning from its highest leadership down to relatively low-level positions.

Personnel in many positions of state-owned enterprises (SOEs) and other government-affiliated institutions are also referred to as cadres. These individuals are generally paid by the state. The directors of the central SOEs overseen by SASAC are appointed through the cadre system. The directors of the 50 largest are appointed directly by the Party's Central Committee and are equivalent in rank to ministers or vice ministers.

=== Typology ===
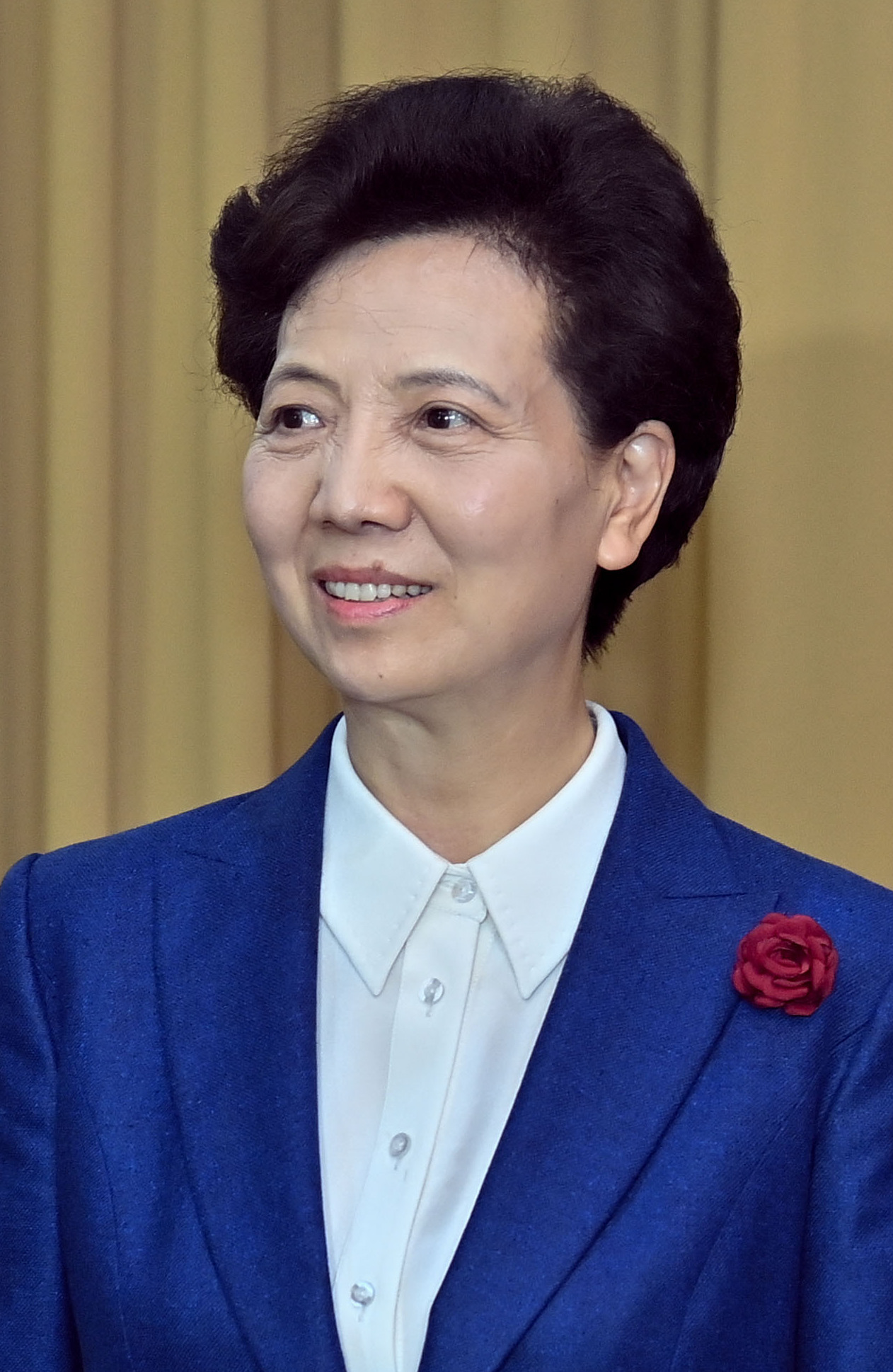
Shen Yiqin, president of the All-China Women's Federation, in 2023

At the national level, cadres in China generally are divided into six categories:

- Leadership and staff of national bodies (e.g. government agencies, National People's Congress, etc.)
- Leadership and staff of the Chinese Communist Party or officially sanctioned democratic parties and their organs
- Active-duty military personnel ranking platoon-level or higher (like a political commissar)
- Leadership and staff of social-political and mass organizations (e.g., the All-China Women's Federation)
- Professional and technical cadres (according to Zhong 2003, specialists such as "engineers, doctors, professors, and artists")
- Management personnel in state-owned enterprises or other public institutions.

=== Leading cadres ===
An additional distinction is made in China between leading cadres (simplified Chinese: 领导干部; traditional Chinese: 領導幹部; pinyin: Lǐngdǎo gànbù) and non-leading cadres. This distinction was first articulated in civil service reforms starting in 1993. Leading cadre status is not dependent on rank, as many high-ranking cadres may nevertheless not be in what is considered a leading position. Leading cadre appointments are governed by the Organization Department of the Chinese Communist Party, whereas non-leading positions are generally managed by the personnel and human resources departments of their respective work units and organizations.

Leading cadres include, in addition to CCP and government officials, state-owned enterprise managers, university leaders, and leaders of people's organizations like the Communist Youth League, the All-China Women's Federation, and the All-China Federation of Industry and Commerce.

Organization Department branches at all levels keep a "leading cadre reserve list" (Chinese: 领导干部候补名单; pinyin: Lǐngdǎo gànbù hòubǔ míngdān) from which capable cadres may be selected to fill leading positions as they become vacant. These lists are maintained by the next-highest level Organization Department (that is, a township-level list would be maintained by the county-level Organization Department, and so on).

While concise statistics are not published, Chan and Gao 2018 estimated that there were roughly two million leading cadres.

== History ==
The cadre system is one of the few organs of the party-state which have functioned continuously during the PRC's history.

=== Pre-revolution ===
The Chinese Communist Party expanded rapidly in the initial years following its founding in 1921. After being driven back to Yan'an during the Long March, Mao Zedong focused on consolidating and expanding the CCP, whose membership had fallen from 300,000 to 40,000. Taking advantage of the Second Sino-Japanese War, which commanded the majority of the ruling Kuomintang's attention, the CCP grew massively over the next several years as it entered Japanese-occupied territory and recruited there. It relied heavily on its Red Army to establish power in these liberated territories and identify outstanding activists for recruitment. By 1939, it controlled over 150 counties with a population of over 100 million.

The CCP's territorial growth necessitated more members to serve as cadres, and the party accordingly relaxed somewhat its membership restrictions on intellectuals, former left-wing Kuomintang officers, and others not of a purely working peasant background. Peasants and laborers, while forming the core ideological base of the CCP, were largely illiterate and uneducated, and thus not well suited for the work of some higher-level cadre positions. Consequently, at the county level and above, the majority of cadres were composed of educated individuals. In contrast, branch and district Party cadres were overwhelmingly composed of local laborers and peasants, who knew local conditions well and could better form relationships with the community. Still, despite the need for some educated cadres, during the Civil War era, the CCP focused mainly on recruiting peasants for guerrilla warfare. Thus, among the cadres, ability to lead and command fighters was generally more important than ability to manage occupied areas.

After the Surrender of Japan and the resumption of active hostilities in the Chinese Civil War, Party membership continued to swell as it further advanced against the Kuomintang, reaching three million members by 1948. Much of this growth was driven by the occupation of Manchuria following Imperial Japan's withdrawal; the CCP dispatched 100,000 troops and 20,000 cadres to establish control over the territory. While nationwide data does not exist on the breakdown of cadre versus non-cadre membership, it appears that a large number of CCP members were considered cadres at that time.

By the end of the Civil War, the Chinese Communist Party had established an organizational structure capable of governing itself and the non-CCP people and organizations it oversaw in occupied territories. Its focus, however, had been warfare, as opposed to statecraft, administration and economic development, and thus it soon faced a serious administrative manpower shortage.

=== Mao-era cadres ===
The Communist Party at the founding of the PRC faced an acute shortage of qualified personnel to fill the over 2.7 million public positions needed to govern the country. By 1955, the CCP had established a system of appointments to fill positions modeled closely after the nomenklatura system of the Soviet Union. Due to the high demand for manpower, the CCP was forced to rely on former Kuomintang officials to fill many of these low-level positions, which helped alleviate the shortage by 1952. By 1956, in part due to the Three-anti and Five-anti Campaigns, most of these former officials had been dismissed.

The government of China in its early years also drew upon intellectuals (those with a high school or above education) to fill the gaps in its cadres. Older intellectuals were viewed as more susceptible to influences of bourgeois ideology, but their specialized skills make them useful. Younger intellectuals (new graduates around the time of the founding of the People's Republic) were similarly useful, and could claim they were less influenced by bourgeois thought than their older predecessors. Even so, Mao's eventually grew suspicious of this group, and he eventually initiated the Socialist Education Movement in 1963 to purge perceived intellectual reactionaries from cadre ranks.

"Old cadres"—those who had joined the CCP before the founding of the People's Republic—maintained an outsize influence on governance in the years following 1949. They occupied the leadership positions of party committees at all levels, but were largely uneducated and lacked the administrative or other specialized skill of their ex-Kuomintang counterparts. Broadly speaking, party loyalty took precedence over educational background for the promotion of cadres to high-level administrative positions in Maoist China. A college education did not become necessary to attain such positions until after the death of Mao.

The Seven Thousand Cadres Conference took place in Beijing in 1962.

In 1965, there were 9.3 million government officials classified as cadres. During the Cultural Revolution, the general disorganization of the CCP and China limited any effective use of the system. Appointments to leadership positions became highly irregular, and the Central Organization Department was not mentioned in Chinese press at all from 1967 to 1972.

Unlike contemporary cadres, cadres in the Mao era could not leave a government job to enter private business or to seek voluntary transfer to a different region or office. Few cadres left their positions voluntarily—doing so was almost always involuntary.

=== Reform era cadres ===
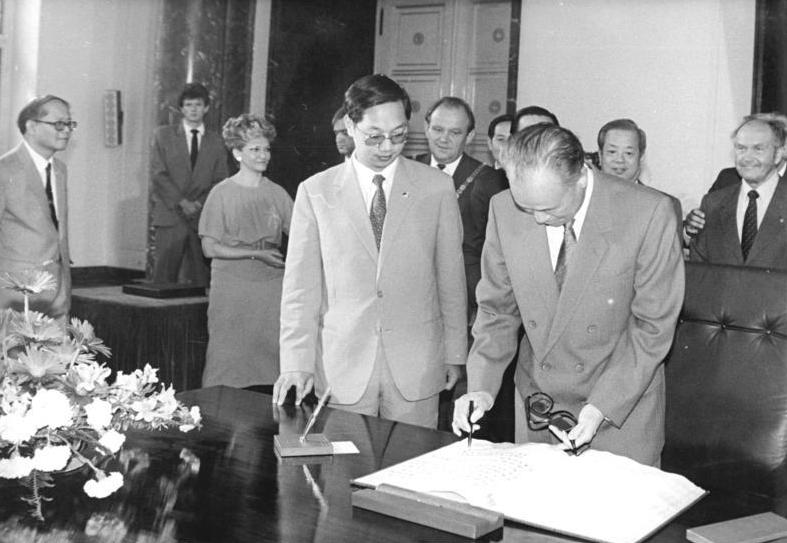
Zhao Ziyang visiting the German Democratic Republic after his election as General Secretary of the Chinese Communist Party in 1987.

Following the death of Mao Zedong and the sidelining of Hua Guofeng, China began to embark upon a series of systemic economic reforms under Deng Xiaoping. By 1980, efforts began to re-institutionalize the cadre system after the discord of the Cultural Revolution, so that the CCP would be able to effectively carry out the modernization of China. These efforts particularly focused on a strengthened ideological education of cadres to reinforce understanding of their own role in the mass line connecting the people and the CCP.

That year, Deng called for a rejuvenation of the system via promotion of "revolutionary, younger, more educated, and more technically specialized" cadre. These priorities were described as the "Four Cadre Transformations" and resulted in promotions of engineers and intellectuals to official positions. Regulations following the Four Cadre Transformations included establishing a cadre retirement system, age limits for leading cadres, and new recruitment and promotion rules. The CCP also implemented the "third echelon" policy. The policy sought to promote a total of 135,000 younger officials at all levels to prepare for the retirement for the impending retirement of older leaders in 1985.

In August 1984, the system was reformed to decentralize authority, in part, because the Central Organization Department was unable to keep up with the nearly 13,000 positions it was nominally in charge of. These reforms drastically reduced the number of positions on the central nomenklatura, transferring their management to provincial authorities. In turn, these positions were further devolved to lower authorities. The total number of cadre positions—estimated at over 8.1 million in 1982 (cf. 6,932,000 in 2007 per Li 2007)—stayed the same, but overall control by local authorities increased.

Zhao Ziyang, elected General Secretary of the Chinese Communist Party in January 1987, made a proposal for deep reform of the cadre system as a part of his address to the 13th Party Congress. Zhao sought to establish a more independent civil service not completely dependent upon the CCP, and thus reform the relationship between the party and the Chinese state. Zhao envisioned a system wherein administrative cadres (i.e. civil servants) would be managed by their respective government bodies themselves, instead of the party's Organization Department, which would in turn shift toward a research and policy-focused role as opposed to one of personnel management and selection. Government recruitment and promotion would be merit-based, relying heavily on standardized examinations, and civil servants would receive a degree of protection from arbitrary dismissal. Deng Xiaoping shared a dissatisfaction with the personnel system at that time, and also pushed for separation of the state and Party.

In the aftermath of the 1989 Tiananmen Square protests and massacre, Zhao and other reformists fell from power and the civil service reform project denounced by remaining Party leaders. Zhao's proposals were subsequently heavily modified and implemented as the "Provisional Regulations on State Civil Servants" in 1993, albeit on a much less comprehensive scale. The Regulations formally differentiated civil servants and cadres in certain state entities like hospitals, schools, and state-owned enterprises. It did, however, contain provisions for the systematic use of examinations, but only in recruitment for non-leading positions. The Provisional Regulations established the first formal civil service in China since the founding of the People's Republic.

=== Reform since the 2000s ===
The 1993 Provisional Regulations on State Civil Servants were deliberately narrow, a reflection of the desires of more conservative Politburo members, particularly Li Peng. In 1995, the Ministry of Personnel released a report arguing that the Regulations needed to be expanded to include areas of state authority that were not included originally, such as the judicial system.

In 2019, the Central Committee of the Chinese Communist Party issued a rule requiring members abroad to contact CCP cells at home at least once every six months.

== Training and ideology ==
=== Ideal cadre traits ===
In 1937, Mao outlined a broad vision of cadres as quality personnel capable of linking the CCP with the masses in the places where they worked. This vision was eventually included in the Little Red Book:

Our Party organizations must be extended all over the country and we must purposefully train tens of thousands of cadres and hundreds of first-rate mass leaders. They must be cadres and leaders versed in Marxism-Leninism, politically far-sighted, competent in work, full of the spirit of self-sacrifice, capable of tackling problems on their own, steadfast in the midst of difficulties and loyal and devoted in serving the nation, the class and the Party. It is on these cadres and leaders that the Party relies for its links with the membership and the masses, and it is by relying on their firm leadership of the masses that the Party can succeed in defeating the enemy. Such cadres and leaders must be free from selfishness, from individualistic heroism, ostentation, sloth, passivity, and arrogant sectarianism, and they must be selfless national and class heroes; such are the qualities and the style of work demanded of the members, cadres and leaders of our Party.

Beginning in 1949, Mao emphasized the "Two Musts", a slogan asserting, "We must be sure to make cadres continue to preserve a work style of humility, circumspection, free from arrogance and rashness; and we must be sure to make cadres continue to preserve a work style of hard work and struggle."

The CCP in particular sought to avoid any manifestation of "bureaucratism" (simplified Chinese: 官僚主义; traditional Chinese: 官僚主義; pinyin: guānliáo zhǔyì), a general term referring to potentially undesirable traits that would hinder cadres' ability to effectively work toward achieving socialism. Mao further expanded upon the list of these traits in his 1970 essay, "Twenty Manifestations Of Bureaucracy," including factionalism, stupidity, and reliance on excessive red tape.

Subsequent slogans expressing moral instruction and expectation for cadres' work style including the "Eight Upholds and the Eight Opposes" (originating during the Jiang Zemin era) and the "Six Upholds" (expressed during the Hu Jintao era). As academic Fengyuan Ji writes, "The frequent use of numerical slogans to codify moral norms goes back to imperial times."

Pursuant to the 2018 amendments to the Civil Service Law and the 2019 Work Regulations for the Promotion and Appointment of Leading Party and Government Cadres, "political quality" and "political standard" are the most important criteria for recruiting and evaluating cadres.

Cadres are also prohibited from investing in private equity. CCP members can be expelled for reading banned materials in private, using drugs, or soliciting prostitution. As of 2024, CCP branches can expel members who "lack revolutionary spirit" or fail to take part in organizational activities for six months without a valid reason. Cadres are not permitted to possess or read books banned for the general populace. Personal relationships with non-Chinese individuals are scrutinized and can lead to expulsion from the CCP.

==== Religion ====
The CCP requires its members to be atheists. Party regulations state that religious members are to be given a chance to renounce their beliefs and be expelled if they do not. Cadres that actively practice religion or frequent fortune-tellers have faced investigation and expulsion from the CCP. However, CCP members are permitted to consult fortune-tellers for picking the name of a baby.

=== Party schools ===
The CCP runs party schools (Chinese: 党校; pinyin: dǎngxiào) that provide training and education to mid-career Party cadres, as well as some military, government, and business cadres. The highest of these are run by the CCP Central Committee and cater to cadres from across the country. The foremost party schools include:

- The Central Party School of the Chinese Communist Party in Beijing, with a focus on Marxist theory for high-level cadres
- The China National School of Administration in Beijing, which aims to "improv[e] administrative capacity of government staff"
- The Chinese Business Executive Academy in Dalian, with a focus on management and economics for state-owned enterprise leaders
- The China Executive Leadership Academy in Pudong, Shanghai, which focuses on international affairs
- The China Yan'an Executive Leadership Academy in Yan'an, and the China Jinggangshan Executive Leadership Academy in Jinggangshan, both of which provide "training on revolutionary traditions and conditions" in China.

== Structure and organization ==
While the government of China and its legislature have technical authority to manage cadres, in practice, this is the sole purview of the CCP. Party committees at all levels (broadly, local, provincial, and national levels) take responsibility for cadre management, usually through the Organization Department, and generally one or two administrative levels lower than the committee. Thus, the national Party body, the Central Committee of the Chinese Communist Party, will manage cadres at or above the provincial or equivalent level, and provincial Party committees will manage prefectures and prefecture-level cities, which in turn manage county-level cadres. County Party committees manage town and township cadres, which manage grassroots cadres. The Central Committee itself only manages an estimated 4,000 to 5,000 cadre positions directly, including figures such as the provincial governors and deputy governors, chairmen of provincial People's Congresses, and chief procurators in the judicial system.

All cadres have a specific grade (simplified Chinese: 级别; traditional Chinese: 級別; pinyin: jíbié) that designates their relative seniority at a national level. Grade also determines an individual's pay, with variation regionally and across different organizations. A cadre's grade corresponds with the rank (simplified Chinese: 职务; traditional Chinese: 職務; pinyin: zhíwù; lit. 'post', 'position') they occupy. Rank and grade are nationally standardized, allowing for cadres from different places to easily determine their position and authority relative to others.

Through the cadre exchange system, the Party rotates officials between different posts and locations in the country. This approach focuses on developing officials' comprehensive knowledge and experience for future roles and does not generally seek to match particular leaders with the immediate needs of a specific position or location.

The administration of Deng Xiaoping made cadre system reform a component of overall reform and opening up. Cadres under Mao were often appointed based on revolutionary fervor as opposed to technical competence, and many were uneducated.

Certain cadres have access to a special supply system for foodstuffs called tegong. CCP leadership cadres have access to a dedicated healthcare system managed by the General Office of the Chinese Communist Party.

=== Evaluation of party secretaries and state chiefs ===
Pursuant to the cadre evaluation system, each level of China's parallel party and state bureaucracies designs formal criteria for the level subordinate to it, listing targets to be achieved in the forthcoming year. Targets are evaluated on a points basis, typically out of 100 points total for all criteria. Leaders are ranked annually relative to their peers.

== Awards ==
=== Outstanding Communist Party Member ===
Outstanding Communist Party Member (Chinese: 优秀共产党员) is an honorary title awarded to members by the Chinese Communist Party (CCP) at all levels (central, provincial, municipal, county, and various industries and government agencies). The standards and conditions for outstanding Communist Party members vary depending on the work, but generally there are three aspects: firm ideological and political beliefs and consistency with the central government; strong work style and high prestige; excellent work ability and outstanding achievements. The National Outstanding Communist Party Member is awarded by the Organization Department of the Chinese Communist Party.

Party members who have performed outstandingly and sacrificed their lives in responding to natural disasters, handling emergencies, completing major tasks, and protecting the lives and property of the people can be posthumously awarded the title of Outstanding Communist Party Member.

In 2013 the CCP Central Committee launched an online voting and recommendation campaign for Communist Party members deemed "outstanding" across the country.

== See also ==
- Cadre management in the Soviet Union
