= President of the Central Party School =

Chinese Communist Party position

President of the Central Party School of the Central Committee of the Chinese Communist Party
- 中共中央党校校长
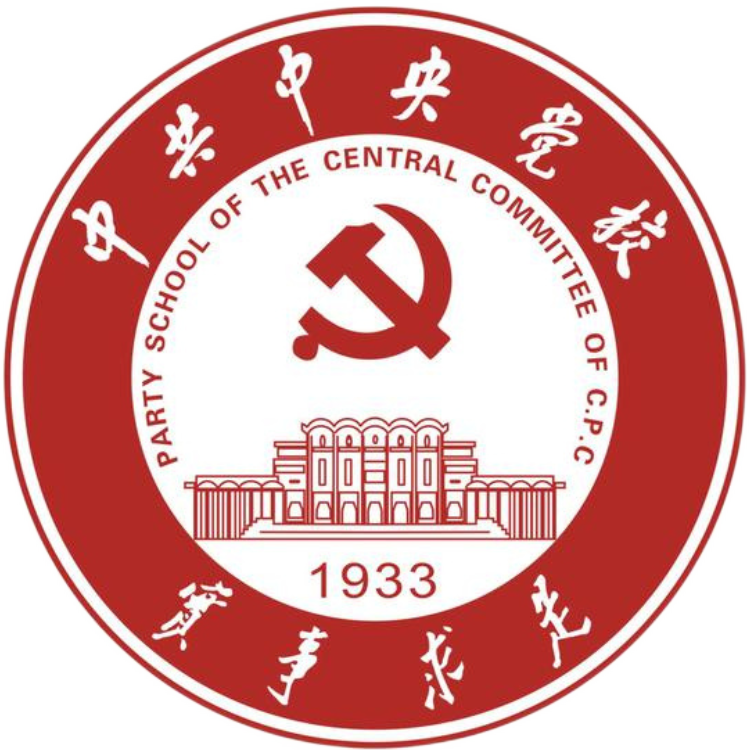
- Seal of the Central Party School

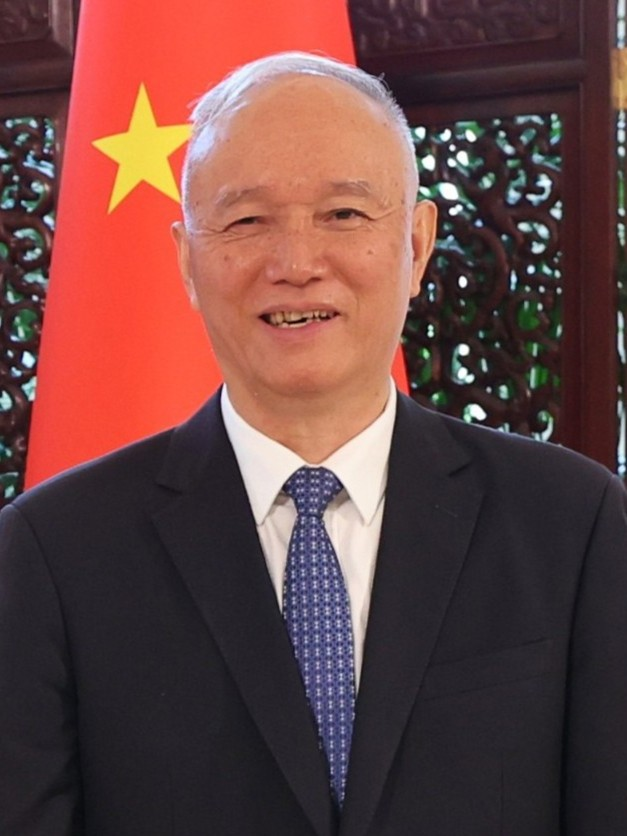
- Incumbent; Cai Qi since 5 June 2026
- Central Party School
- Type: University president
- Status: Provincial and ministerial-level official
- Seat: Beijing
- Nominator: Central Committee
- Appointer: Central Committee
- Inaugural holder: Ren Bishi
- Formation: November 1931
- Deputy: Vice President

The President of the Central Party School of the Chinese Communist Party is the head of the Central Party School. The President of the Central Party School also leads the three training centers for Party cadres; the China Executive Leadership Academy Pudong, the China Executive Leadership Academy Yan'an, and the China Executive Leadership Academy Jinggangshan.

== List of presidents ==
Name	Name (Chinese)	Tenure begins	Tenure ends	References
Ren Bishi	任弼时	November 1931	April 1933	
Zhang Wentian	张闻天	April 1933	January 1934	
Li Weihan	李维汉	April 1933	1935	
Dong Biwu	董必武	Late 1935	April 1937	
Li Weihan	李维汉	April 1937	March 1938	
Kang Sheng	康生	March 1938	October 1938	
Chen Yun	陈云	October 1938	December 1941	
Deng Fa	邓发	December 1941	March 1943	
Mao Zedong	毛泽东	March 1943	March 1947	
Liu Shaoqi	刘少奇	July 1948	March 1953	
Kai Feng	凯丰	March 1953	November 1954	
Li Zhuoran	李卓然	November 1954	April 1955	
Yang Xianzhen	杨献珍	April 1955	February 1961	
Wang Congwu	王从吾	February 1961	January 1963	
Lin Feng	林枫	January 1963	January 1966	
Hua Guofeng	华国锋	March 1977	April 1982	
Wang Zhen	王震	April 1982	March 1987	
Gao Yang	高扬	March 1987	March 1989	
Qiao Shi	乔石	March 1989	February 1993	
Hu Jintao	胡锦涛	February 1993	December 2002	
Zeng Qinghong	曾庆红	December 2002	December 2007	
Xi Jinping	习近平	December 2007	December 2012	
Liu Yunshan	刘云山	15 January 2013	25 October 2017	
Chen Xi	陈希	25 October 2017	5 June 2026	
Cai Qi	蔡奇	5 June 2026	Incumbent	
