= China Executive Leadership Academy Jinggangshan =

Chinese Communist Party college

- 中国井冈山干部学院
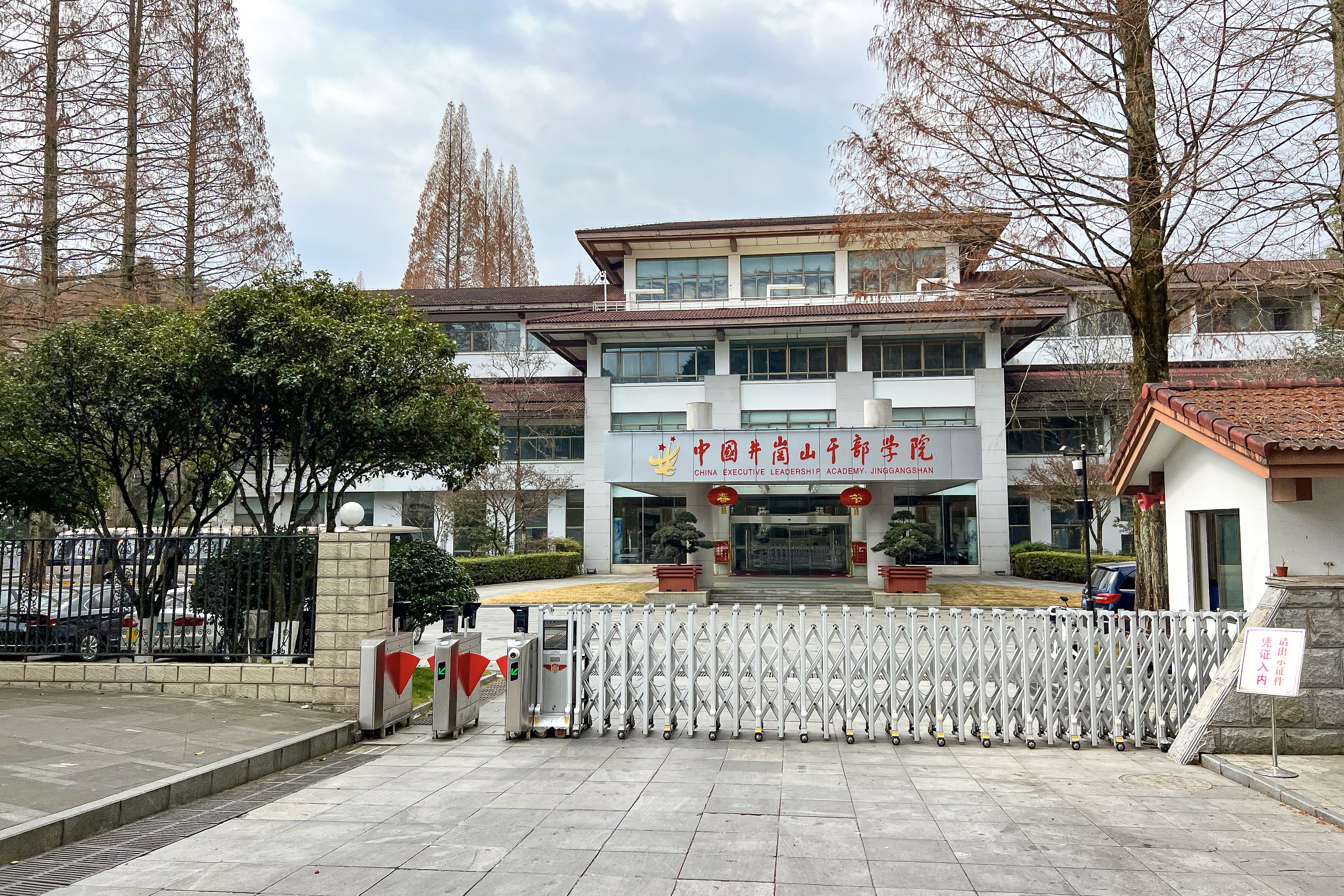
- Type: Party School
- Established: 2005; 21 years ago
- Parent institution: Central Committee of the Chinese Communist Party
- President: Chen Xi
- Location: 6 North Hongjun Road, Jinggangshan City, Ji'an, 343699, China; 26.5773°N 114.1569°E
- Campus: Urban
- Website: www.celaj.gov.cn

China Executive Leadership Academy Jinggangshan (CELAP) is a school located in Jinggangshan, Jiangxi, directly under the Central Committee of the Chinese Communist Party (CCP). It is one of the three nationwide Leadership Academies, along with the ones in Pudong and Yan'an. It is managed by the party's Central Organization Department, with assistance from the Jiangxi Provincial Committee of the CCP. The president of the Central Party School serves as the school's leader.

== History ==
The school was opened in late 2005.

== Campus ==
CELAP has a 44-acre (18 ha) campus. CCP members are required to take at least 32 sessions of training per year, while some leadership posts require 56 sessions. The academy also organizes a "Jinggangshan Spirit" course.
