= 15th Secretariat of the Chinese Communist Party =

Chinese government body

The 15th Secretariat, formally the Secretariat of the 15th Central Committee of the Communist Party of China, was nominated by the 15th Politburo Standing Committee and approved by the 1st plenary session of the 15th Central Committee on 19 September 1997, in the aftermath of the 15th National Congress of the Chinese Communist Party (CCP). This electoral term was preceded by the 14th Secretariat and succeeded by the 16th in 2002.

== General Secretary of the Central Committee ==
General Secretary of the 15th Central Committee of the Chinese Communist Party
Portrait	Name	Hanzi	Birth	PM	Death	Ref.
	Jiang Zemin	江泽民	1926	1946	2022	

== Composition ==
Members of the Secretariat of the 15th Central Committee of the Chinese Communist Party
Rank	Name	Hanzi	14th SEC	16th SEC	Birth	PM	Death	Birthplace	No. of offices	Ref.
1	Hu Jintao	胡锦涛	Old	Not	1942	1964	Alive	Jiangsu	Three: Party offices; President, Central Party School of the Central Committee; Military offices; Vice Chairman, Central Military Commission; State offices; Vice President of the People's Republic of China	
2	Wei Jianxing	尉健行	Old	Not	1931	1949	2015	Zhejiang	One: Party office; Secretary, Standing Committee of the Central Commission for Discipline Inspection	
3	Ding Guangen	丁关根	Old	Not	1929	1956	2012	Jiangsu	One: Party office; Head, Publicity Department of the Central Committee	
4	Zhang Wannian	张万年	New	Not	1928	1945	2015	Shandong	One: Military office; Vice Chairman, Central Military Commission	
5	Luo Gan	罗干	Old	Not	1935	1960	Alive	Shandong	Two: Party office; Secretary, Central Political and Legal Affairs Commission; State office; State Councillor of the People's Republic of China	
6	Wen Jiabao	温家宝	Old	Not	1942	1965	Alive	Tianjin	One: State office; Vice Premier of the People's Republic of China	
7	Zeng Qinghong	曾庆红	New	Reelected	1939	1960	Alive	Jiangxi	Two: Party offices; Head, General Office of the Central Committee; Head, Organization Department of the Central Committee	

== See also ==
- 15th Politburo Standing Committee of the Chinese Communist Party
- 15th Politburo of the Chinese Communist Party
- 15th Central Committee of the Chinese Communist Party
