= Liu Shahe =

Chinese writer and poet (1931–2019)

- Born: 11 November 1931; Chengdu, Sichuan, China
- Died: 23 November 2019 (aged 88); Chengdu, Sichuan, China
- Education: Sichuan University
- Occupations: Poet, writer, publisher
- Children: 1 son, 1 daughter
- Writing career
- Language: Chinese
- Period: 1948–2019
- Notable works: The Country Nocturnes (1956), Poems of Liu Shahe (1982)
- Notable awards: National Prize for Poetry

Chinese name
- Chinese: 流沙河
Transcriptions
Standard Mandarin
- Hanyu Pinyin: Liú Shāhé
- IPA: [ljǒʊ ʂá.xɤ̌]

Birth name
- Simplified Chinese: 余勋坦
- Traditional Chinese: 余勛坦
Transcriptions
Standard Mandarin
- Hanyu Pinyin: Yú Xūntǎn

Yu Xuntan (Chinese: 余勋坦; 11 November 1931 – 23 November 2019), known by his pen name Liu Shahe (Chinese: 流沙河), was a Chinese writer and poet. The son of a Sichuan landowner who was executed in the Land Reform Movement, he began publishing in 1948 and became a professional writer in 1952. He co-founded the poetry magazine Stars in 1956, but was denounced as a "filial descendant of the landlord class" when the Anti-Rightist Campaign began in 1957. For the next two decades he performed hard labour and was exiled to the countryside until the end of the Cultural Revolution. He resumed publishing in 1978, and his collection, Poems of Liu Shahe (1982), won the National Prize for Poetry.

== Biography ==
Yu Xuntan was born on 11 November 1931 in Chengdu, the capital of Sichuan province, Republic of China. His parents were small landowners from Jintang County near Chengdu, and the family moved back to Jintang in 1935. His father worked for the Kuomintang government, and for that reason was executed by the Communist Party during the Land Reform Movement. According to Liu, Liu had no hatred towards the Communist Party as a result of the execution.

He entered Sichuan University in 1949, majoring in agricultural chemistry. He began writing in 1948, and served as an editor of a supplement to the newspaper Western Sichuan Peasant Daily. He became a professional writer in 1952, and joined the predecessor of the Communist Youth League of China that same year.

In 1955, Liu published his first poem, which was well received by critics, and became a poet almost exclusively. The following year, he published The Country Nocturnes, his first poetry collection, and was admitted to the Academy of Literature. Together with three other poets, he founded Stars, a monthly poetry magazine, in 1956. He wrote the poem series entitled "Grass and Stars" for the inaugural issue of the magazine, but was criticized soon after its publication.

In early 1957, Liu published Pieces on Plants, which ultimately resulted in waves of debate and political criticism. These poems used plant imagery to characterize aspects of life in the People's Republic of China. Pieces on Plants became a point of political contention as the Hundred Flowers Campaign cooled. Other literary journals criticized the poems; for example, a response by Ye Yonglie described Pieces on Plants as a "squeaking lament for the old society, packed with feelings of decline, by an extremely small number of those not willing to accept socialism.

In February 1957, Liu and his editor at the journal Stars (which had published Pieces on Plants) were criticized at a meeting of the Sichuan China Federation of Literary and Arts Circles. Attendees contended that Liu must be "harboring hatred for the murder of his father". Both Liu and his editor were suspended from their editorial positions at Stars, effective with 1957's third issue.

Mao Zedong referenced Pieces on Plants throughout his speeches in February and March 1957. Mao stated that Pieces on Plants was a "poisonous weed" that should be criticized, but that "even with a hundred Pieces on Plants there would be no chaos."

On 8 June 1957, the People's Daily editorial "Why is This So?" was published, changing the political environment significantly. It described the previous "airing of views" during the Hundred Flowers Campaign as an attack by "rightists". Afterward the editorial, those who had supported Liu and his editor, those who had defended Pieces on Plants during earlier debates, and those who imitated the style of Pieces on Plants were alleged to have been part of a Liu Shahe "counterrevolutionary clique".

When the Anti-Rightist Campaign began in 1957, Liu was denounced as a "filial descendant of the landlord class". A trial of Liu was overseen by the head of the propaganda department in Sichuan, who mitigated the harshest criticisms of Liu. Liu provided a confession in which he implicated his editor as having planned to undermine the Communist Party and socialism. By doing so, Liu avoided being penalized with reform through labour. He was expelled from civil service work and the Communist Youth League and kept at CFLAC in Sichuan where he was provided a small allowance. Through CFLAC, he spent the next eight years, working all sorts of jobs including labourer and librarian.

During the Cultural Revolution, he was sent home and worked in manual labour. He continued to compose poems in this period, but most of them were lost. After the end of the Cultural Revolution, Liu resumed publishing in 1978. His collection, Poems of Liu Shahe (1982), was awarded the National Prize for Poetry. Many of his poems expressed a sense of loss over his youth and sentimentality for the years he spent as a downtrodden labourer. Other poems, written in a serene tone, recorded the emotional solace he found in the difficult times. He wrote less poetry after the mid-1980s, and spent much time publishing and commenting on modern Taiwanese poetry.

Liu was an outspoken critic of the simplification of Chinese characters. He wrote a dedicated column entitled "Simplified Characters are Unreasonable" (简化字不讲理/簡化字不講理) in the Chinese-language edition of the Financial Times.

== Selected books ==
- The Country Nocturnes 农村夜曲 (1956) [農村夜曲], first collection of poems
- Windows 窗 (1956) [窗], collection of short stories
- Farewell to Mars 告别火星 (1957) [告別火星], second collection of poems
- Poems of Liu Shahe 流沙河诗话 (1982) [流沙河詩話], winner of the National Prize for Poetry
- Track of the Wanderer 游踪 (1983) [游蹤], collection of poems
- Goodbye, Hometown 故园别 (1983) [故園別], collection of poems
- Twelve Taiwan Poets 台湾诗人十二家[臺灣詩人十二家], commentary on Taiwanese poetry
- Talking of Poetry Across the Sea 隔海说诗[隔海說詩], commentary on Taiwanese poetry

== Personal life ==
Liu married in 1966. He had a daughter and a son, Yu Kun (余鲲).

Liu died in Chengdu on 23 November 2019 from complications of throat cancer, aged 88.

== See also ==
- Tie Liu, a fellow Sichuanese writer denounced and imprisoned as a "rightist"
