= China Executive Leadership Academy Yan'an =

Chinese Communist Party college

- 中国延安干部学院
- Type: Party School
- Established: 2005; 21 years ago
- Parent institution: Central Committee of the Chinese Communist Party
- President: Chen Xi
- Location: 40 Zaoyuan Road, Baota District, Yan'an, 716000, China
- Campus: Urban
- Website: www.celay.org.cn

China Executive Leadership Academy Yan'an (CELAP) is a school located in Yan'an, Shaanxi, directly under the Central Committee of the Chinese Communist Party. It is managed by the CCP Central Organization Department, with assistance from the Shaanxi Provincial Committee of the CCP. The president of the Central Party School serves as the school's leader.

== History ==
The school was opened in late 2005. Yan'an was chosen as it was the historical base of the CCP during the Chinese Civil War.

== Campus ==
The academy in Yan'an focuses on CCP history, team building, revolutionary tradition and basic social conditions. It offers courses on Marxist law and economics. It also offers courses on the "Spirit of Yan'an".
