= Tie Liu =

Chinese journalist (1933–2024)

Tie Liu (Chinese: 铁流; lit. 'Iron Flow'; 29 May 1933 – 8 September 2024) was the pen name of the Chinese writer and underground publisher Huang Zerong (Chinese: 黄泽荣).

== Biography ==
Tie Liu was born in 1933 in Sichuan, Republic of China, and was an ardent revolutionary in his youth. In 1957, during Communist leader Mao Zedong's Anti-Rightist Campaign, he was labelled a "rightist" and spent the next 23 years in labour camps. After he was politically rehabilitated in 1980, he made a living as a journalist, and published books and memoirs of other people persecuted by Mao. The memoirs are banned in China.

On 14 September 2014, Tie Liu was detained by Beijing police on charges of "provoking trouble". At age 81, he was one of the oldest Chinese dissidents to be detained. According to his wife Ren Hengfang, his detention was likely because he had recently published an essay criticizing Liu Yunshan, a powerful CPC Politburo Standing Committee member and China's propaganda chief. He publicly accused Liu of corruption and urged Chinese leader Xi Jinping to dismiss him.

On 25 February 2015, a Chengdu court convicted Tie Liu of "illegal business activity". He was sentenced to two and a half years in prison and fined 30,000 yuan. However, the sentence was suspended for four years, allowing him to be released on bail and stay out of prison.

Tie died on 8 September 2024, at the age of 91.

== See also ==
- Liu Shahe, a fellow Sichuanese writer denounced and imprisoned as a "Rightist"
