= Yang Xianzhen =

Chinese politician (1896–1992)

Yang Xianzhen (simplified Chinese: 杨献珍; traditional Chinese: 楊獻珍; pinyin: Yáng Xiànzhēn) (July 24, 1896 – August 25, 1992) was a Chinese Communist Party politician who was the tenth president of the Central Party School of the Chinese Communist Party, the highest training centre for party workers and leaders. Yang served as its vice-president from 1948 to 1955, and as president from 1955 to 1961.

Yang was surrounded with controversy during the Cultural Revolution, partly because of his more moderate Orthodox Marxist views, his Two Unite into One philosophical concept, and his links to the 61 renegades conspiracy and was eventually purged in 1967. He received only partial rehabilitation in 1980 and died in 1992.

== Biography ==
From 1927 to 1929, Yang was imprisoned as a political prisoner in Hubei.

Yang first became associated with the Central Party School in Yan'an in 1945, serving as its vice-president from 1948 to 1955, when he replace Liu Shaoqi as its president. In September 1956, he was honoured at the Eighth Party Congress, first becoming an alternate member of the Eighth Central Committee, and then a full member in May 1958. By 1955, Yang had written extensively articulating orthodox Marxist views on materialism, advocating for a gradual economic transition towards communism.

From 1961 and until December 1965 he served as Vice-President of the Party School again.

He became surrounded by the One Divides into Two controversy in 1964 when his Two Unite into One philosophical concept was interpreted as supporting capitalist restoration. This, alongside his ties to the 61 Renegades case, ultimately led to his detention at the Philosophical Research Institute of the Academy of Science in May 1967 and his arrest and imprisonment in September 1967. Following the official announcement overturning the verdict of the 61 Renegades in 1978, Yang's rehabilitation was delayed and limited. Yang did not even regain his Central Committee alternate membership and only received a honorary position as advisor to the Central Party School. His formal rehabilitation came only in November 1980 when the "The Secretariat of the CPCC approved a decision of the CPC Central Committee Party School (...) repudiating all labels imposed on him (...) like 'opposing Mao Zedong's Thought".

Yang died in Beijing in 1992.

== See also ==
- 61 Renegades

Party political offices
Preceded by Li Zhuoran	President of the Central Party School; 1955–1961	Succeeded by Wang Congwu
