= The Party: The Secret World of China's Communist Rulers =

Book by Richard McGregor

- Cover of the 2010 first edition.
- Author: Richard McGregor
- Language: English
- Genre: History
- Publisher: Penguin Books
- Publication date: 25/6/2010
- Media type: Print (Hardback)
- ISBN: 978-1-84614-173-7
- Website: The Party: The Secret World of China's Communist Rulers at the Internet Archive

The Party: The Secret World of China's Communist Rulers is a book written by Richard McGregor, a former bureau chief of the Financial Times in China. It was published by Penguin Books on June 25, 2010. The traditional Chinese version 《中國共產黨不可說的秘密》 was published by Linking Publishing Company (聯經出版) in Taiwan, Republic of China on September 16, 2011.
