= Li Zhuoran =

Chinese politician

Li Zhuoran (Chinese: 李卓然; pinyin: Lǐ Zhuórán) (1899–1989) was a Chinese Communist Party politician who was the ninth president of the Central Party School of the Chinese Communist Party, the highest training center for party workers and leaders. Li Zhuoran served as president from 1954 to 1955.

Party political offices
Preceded by Kai Feng	President of the Central Party School; 1954–1955	Succeeded by Yang Xianzhen
