= Kai Feng (politician) =

Chinese politician (1906–1955)

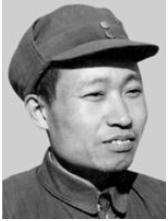
Kai Feng

Kai Feng (Chinese: 凯丰; pinyin: Kǎi Fēng; 1906 – March 23, 1955), born He Kequan (何克全), was a Chinese Communist Party revolutionary and politician. He was one of the 28 Bolsheviks trained in Moscow. He was the eighth president of the Central Party School of the Chinese Communist Party, the highest training center for party workers and leaders. In the spring of 1931 he was sent to the Jiangxi Soviet, along with other cadres. He served in the Yangtze Bureau, the CCP's largest organization outside of Shaanxi from April 1938. Kai served as president from 1953 to 1954.

Party political offices
Preceded by Liu Shaoqi	President of the Central Party School; 1953–1954	Succeeded by Li Zhuoran
