= China Overseas Friendship Association =

External name of the 9th bureau of the United Front Work Department

- 中华海外联谊会
- Formation: May 1997; 29 years ago
- Type: People's organization
- Headquarters: 35 Fu Wai Street, Beijing
- President: Li Ganjie
- Website: www.cofa.org.cn

China Overseas Friendship Association
- Simplified Chinese: 中华海外联谊会
- Traditional Chinese: 中華海外聯誼會
Transcriptions
Standard Mandarin
- Hanyu Pinyin: Hǎiliánhuì

Abbreviation
- Simplified Chinese: 海联会
- Traditional Chinese: 海聯會
Transcriptions

The China Overseas Friendship Association (COFA) is a people's organization under the United Front Work Department of the Central Committee of the Chinese Communist Party. COFA is headquartered in Beijing.

== History ==
The China Overseas Friendship Association was established in Beijing in May 1997. In May 2019, it merged with the China Overseas Exchange Association to form the new China Overseas Friendship Association. COFA is managed by the Ninth Bureau of the United Front Work Department.
