= China Executive Leadership Academy Pudong =

Chinese Communist party college

Coordinates: 31°11′44″N 121°32′32″E

- 中国浦东干部学院
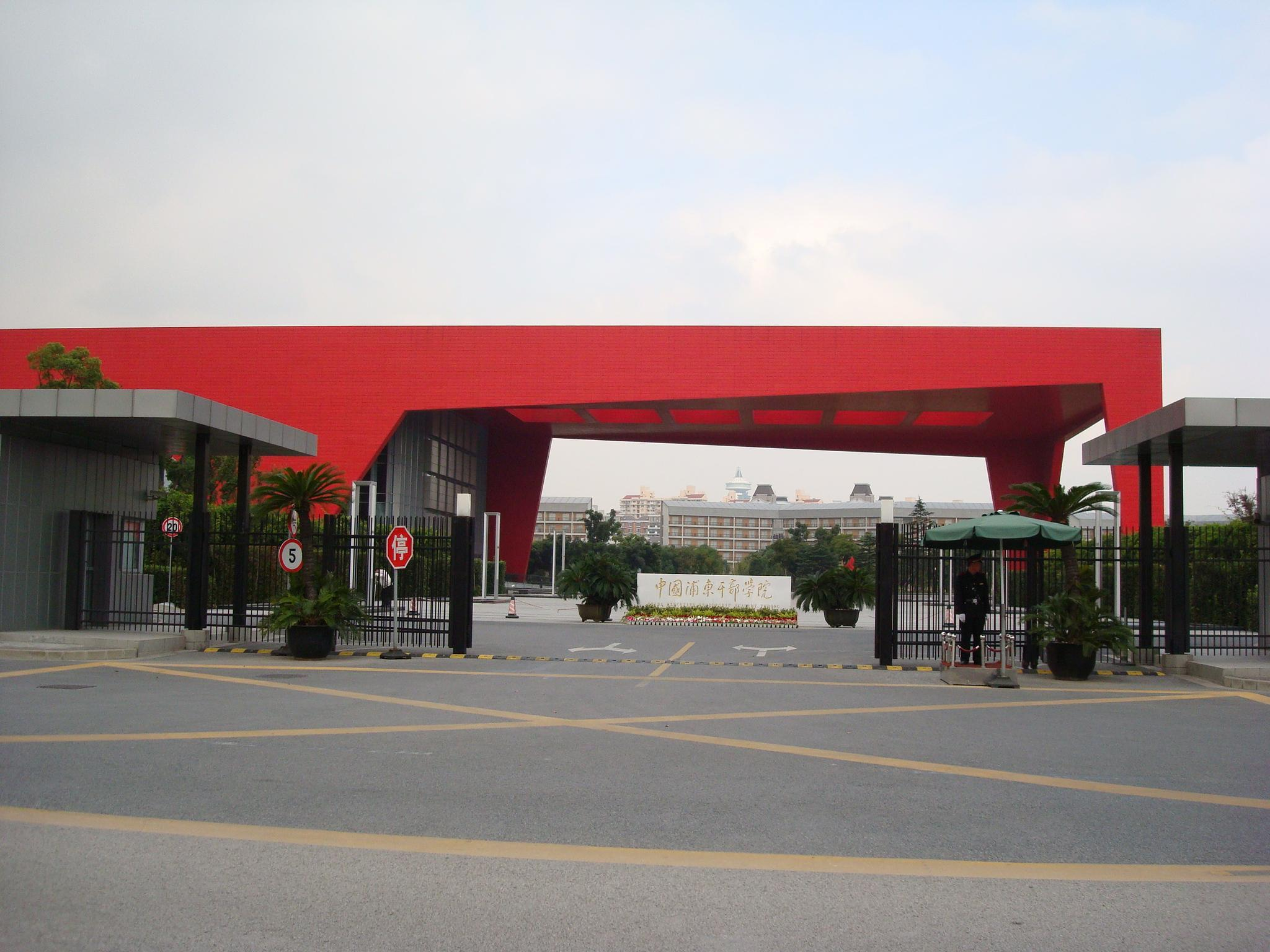
- Type: Party School
- Established: 2005; 21 years ago
- Parent institution: Central Committee of the Chinese Communist Party
- President: Chen Xi
- Vice-president: Yin Hong
- Location: 99 Qiancheng Road, Pudong, Shanghai, 201204, China
- Campus: Urban
- Colors
- Website: www.celap.org.cn

The China Executive Leadership Academy Pudong (CELAP) is a school located in Pudong, Shanghai, directly under the Central Committee of the Chinese Communist Party (CCP). It is managed by the party's Central Organization Department, with assistance from the Shanghai Municipal Committee of the CCP.

== Name ==
The official English name of the school is the "China Executive Leadership Academy Pudong". It is also the name used by The New York Times. Richard McGregor said that the word "cadre" has Communist connotations, so the English name does not use that word, and that the English name makes the institution appear "more like an MBA factory than a pillar of the party system." McGregor argued that the CCP had "calibrated the way the school presents itself at home, to its Chinese students, and separately, to the outside world." He added that "The subtle name change underlines the central purpose of the party school system, which is as much about enforcing and benchmarking loyalty as imparting modern management skills."

== History ==
The school was opened in late 2005.

== Campus ==
CELAP has a 104-acre (42 ha) campus, which includes buildings designed by architects based in Paris. Tom Phillips of The Guardian said that the campus is "oak-lined." Architects Anthony Bechu and Tom Sheehan designed the building to resemble a table from the Ming dynasty period. Richard McGregor, author of The Party: The Secret World of China's Communist Rulers, said that the buildings "resemble a red painting table" and that they "consciously [echo] the place where 'the master teaches the student."

== Purpose ==
Tom Phillips of The Guardian said "faculty directors say Shanghai's Leadership Academy is no ordinary Party school." The executive vice president of CELAP, Feng Jun, said that while students at CELAP are instructed "to love Socialism and to strengthen their faith in the paths of Socialism with Chinese characteristics," "[i]t is not brainwashing [we do] here, it is brainstorming – finding the answers and solutions to the problem" and that "we intend for cadres studying here to free and broaden their minds. Many things can be discussed here." Jiang Haishan, a professor at the school and the head of the school's international program, said "We have an open attitude towards all civilisations that are useful to us, and [we] learn from them."

Frank Pieke, the author of The Good Communist: Elite Training and State Building in Today's China and the head of the Modern China Studies department at Leiden University, said that the school and its other schools were established because the Chinese government had "impatience with the lack of what they call the quality of local cadres and their inability to govern their localities or institutions effectively." Pieke added that the school, "very much part of the new glossy face of the Communist Party under Hu Jintao and Wen Jiabao," is used "to show to the outside world how reliable, predictable, modern they really have become" while it teaches its cadres how they should rule the country and connects them to the outside world.

== Courses ==
Tom Phillips of The Guardian said that while "[t]raditional Red subjects are not totally absent from the academy," "for the most part the academy seems more social media than Socialism, with dusty copies of Das Kapital replaced with talk of microblogging and lectures peppered with English aphorisms."

As of 2012, the school offers a crisis management course with a focus on the 2011 England riots.

== Students ==
As of 2010, the students mostly consist of rising CCP officials, while some students are private entrepreneurs.
