= Richard McGregor =

Australian journalist, writer and author

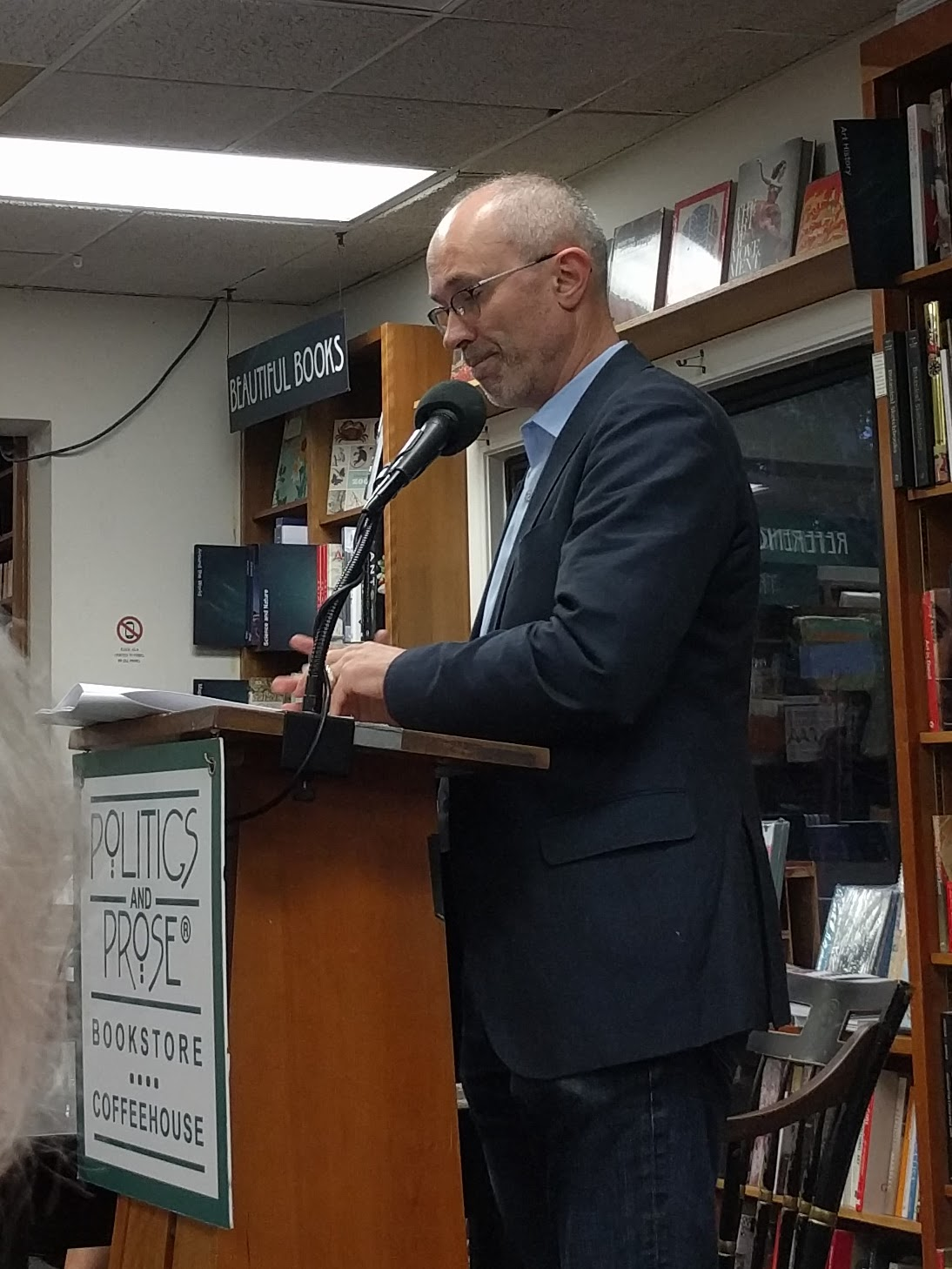
- McGregor at Politics and Prose in 2017
- Born: Sydney, Australia
- Occupations: Bureau Chief for Financial Times; Journalist author
- Known for: Journalist in the Asia Pacific region
- Notable work: Author of Party, Secret world of CPC.
- Website: twitter.com/mcgregorrichard au.linkedin.com/in/richard-mcgregor-b49a2a35

Richard McGregor is an Australian journalist, writer, and author. He is currently working as a Senior Fellow at the Lowy Institute based in Sydney, Australia. He previously was based in Japan and also other locations such as Shanghai, Taiwan, Sydney, Melbourne, Washington, D.C., and London.

== Life ==
Richard McGregor was born in Sydney, Australia. He has worked as a journalist in Taiwan, Sydney, Canberra and Melbourne, and was the chief political correspondent, Japan correspondent, and China correspondent for The Australian. He also worked for the International Herald Tribune, the BBC and the Far Eastern Economic Review, and is the former bureau chief for the Financial Times.

McGregor wrote The Party: The Secret World of China's Communist Rulers, published by Allen Lane from Penguin Press in the UK and HarperCollins in the US in June 2010.

He lived in London, and moved to Washington, D.C., in 2011, to be the Financial Times bureau chief.

He appeared on the Charlie Rose show on 18 January 2011 to discuss Chinese president Hu Jintao's visit to Washington, D.C.; and on 6 September 2017 to discuss Asian, especially Chinese-Japanese, international relations, and the United States' role in Asia.

== Notable works ==
- Japan Swings : Politics, Culture and Sex in the New Japan (Allen & Unwin, 1996) ISBN 1864480777
- The Party: The Secret World of China's Communist Rulers (Allen Lane, 2010) ISBN 9781846141737
- McGregor, Richard (2017). Asia's Reckoning: China, Japan, and the Fate of U.S. Power in the Pacific Century. Viking. ISBN 978-0399562679.
- Xi Jinping: The Backlash (Penguin Random House Australia, 2019) ISBN 9781760893040

== Awards ==
McGregor won the 2010 Society of Publishers in Asia (SOPA) Editorial Excellence Award for reporting on the Xinjiang Riots; and prior to that, the SOPA Award in 2008 for Editorial Intelligences.

In 2018, McGregor's book Asia's Reckoning won the non-fiction category of the Australian Prime Minister’s Literary Awards.
