= Central Leading Group for Publicity, Ideological and Cultural Work =

Chinese Communist Party body

Central Leading Small Group for Propaganda, Ideological and Cultural Work
- 中央宣传思想领导小组; Zhōngyāng Xuānchuán Sīxiǎng Lǐngdǎo Xiǎozǔ
- Emblem of the Chinese Communist Party

Agency overview
- Formed: March 10, 1993; 33 years ago
- Type: Leading small group
- Jurisdiction: Chinese Communist Party
- Headquarters: Beijing
- Agency executives: Cai Qi, Leader; Li Shulei, Deputy Director; Shen Yiqin, Deputy Director
- Parent agency: Central Committee of the Chinese Communist Party

The Central Leading Small Group for Propaganda, Ideological and Cultural Work is a leading small group of the Central Committee of the Chinese Communist Party (CCP) responsible for nationwide propaganda.

Its current group leader is Cai Qi; with Li Shulei and Shen Yiqin as deputies.

== Functions and duties ==
The CLSGPIW controls all propaganda, publicity and information of the Chinese Communist Party as well as the People's Republic of China. The agencies under its scrutiny include the CCP Propaganda Department and the State Council Information Office. Its basic function is to coordinate ideological, propaganda, cultural, media and publishing activities. In both composition and duties, the CLSGPIW overlap another similar body, the CCP Central Guidance Commission for Building Spiritual Civilization.

The group leader is usually the Politburo Standing Committee member in charge of propaganda, while the deputy leader is the head of the Propaganda Department. The rest of the group members (usually five to eight), except for the head and deputy head of the Secretarial Group, seem to be unknown to the public.

== History ==
The Central Leading Small Group for Publicity and Ideological Work was established in the summer of 1957 as the Central Theory Group (中央理论小组; Zhōngyāng Lǐlùn Xiǎozǔ) led by Kang Sheng, but it was replaced on June 10, 1958, by a Central Culture and Education Group (中央文教小组; Zhōngyāng Wénjiào Xiǎozǔ) led by Lu Dingyi, with Kang Sheng as deputy leader and Chen Boda among its members, until a separate leading group for education was established in 1982. The current CLSGPIW was established in 1988 by the CCP Central Committee Directive No. 11.

Its first leader was Hu Qili, although he was dismissed in 1989 for opposing the use of violence against the 1989 Tiananmen Square protests and massacre. Although usually the group leader is a Politburo Standing Committee member, Ding Guangen, who led the CLSGPIW from 1992 to 2002, was concurrently Standing Committee member, Secretariat member and Propaganda Department head.

In June 2023, it was reported that the agency was renamed to the Central Leading Small Group for Publicity, Ideological and Cultural Work.

== List of group leaders ==
1. Hu Qiaomu (1982–1987)
2. Hu Qili (1987–1989)
3. Li Ruihuan (1989–1992)
4. Ding Guangen (1992–2002)
5. Li Changchun (2002–2013)
6. Liu Yunshan (2013–2017)
7. Wang Huning (2017–2023)
8. Cai Qi (2023–present)
