= Liu Yunshan =

Chinese politician

- 刘云山
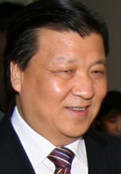
- Liu in 2012

President of the Central Party School
- In office 15 January 2013 – 25 October 2017
- Deputy: He Yiting
- Preceded by: Xi Jinping
- Succeeded by: Chen Xi

Chairman of the Central Guidance Commission on Building Spiritual Civilization
- In office 18 January 2013 – 25 October 2017
- Deputy: Liu Yandong; Liu Qibao; Guo Jinlong
- Preceded by: Li Changchun
- Succeeded by: Wang Huning

Head of the Publicity Department of the Chinese Communist Party
- In office 24 October 2002 – 21 November 2012
- Deputy: Ji Bingxuan (2003–2008); Luo Shugang (2008–2012)
- General Secretary: Hu Jintao
- Preceded by: Ding Guangen
- Succeeded by: Liu Qibao

Personal details
- Born: July 1947 (age 79) Salaqi County, Suiyuan, Republic of China
- Party: Chinese Communist Party (1971–present)
- Education: Jining Teachers College

Liu Yunshan (/ljoʊ jʊnˈʃɑːn/; simplified Chinese: 刘云山; traditional Chinese: 劉雲山; pinyin: Liú Yúnshān; born July 1947) is a retired Chinese politician. He was a member of the Politburo Standing Committee of the Chinese Communist Party, the top decision-making body of the CCP, between 2012 and 2017; he was broadly tasked with the work of the party's secretariat, overseeing propaganda and ideological indoctrination, as well as party organization, in addition to serving as President of the Central Party School.

Liu built his career in Inner Mongolia, working initially as a teacher, then a Xinhua reporter, before entering the Communist Youth League and the Inner Mongolia party propaganda department. He had a short stint working as the Party Secretary of the city of Chifeng, in Inner Mongolia. Between 2002 and 2012, Liu served as the head of the Central Propaganda Department.

Liu, generally perceived by observers to be a conservative and orthodox Communist, oversaw the gradual tightening of internet controls in China during his tenure, as well as an overall reduction in free discourse and civil society. He retired in 2017.

== Early life ==
Liu was born to an ordinary family of farmers in Tumed Qi in Inner Mongolia; he traces his ancestry to Xinzhou, Shanxi province. He spent over twenty years of his career in Inner Mongolia. He joined the Communist Party in 1971. He initially worked as a teacher, then was "sent down" to do manual labour in the countryside as part of the Cultural Revolution.

He attended college part-time at the Teachers College in Jining District, Ulanqab City, Inner Mongolia. He then worked in the local government's public relation department of Tumed Qi. He started working as a reporter for Xinhua News Agency in 1975, writing stories about farmers' nomadic lifestyle in Inner Mongolia and occasionally sleeping in yurts to get close to the people that were part of his story. He was eventually promoted to a supervisory role. He then worked for the provincial Communist Youth League organization. In 1985, the 38-year old Liu earned an alternate seat on the Central Committee of the Chinese Communist Party. In 1986, Liu became the Inner Mongolia State Government's director of public relation in 1986, and by 1987, the Secretary-General of the Inner Mongolia Party committee, a position in charge of coordination the execution of political policies.

Between 1989 and 1992, Liu attended the Central Party School to take courses in public administration. In 1991, he became Party Secretary of the eastern Inner Mongolian city of Chifeng while also holding a seat on the Autonomous Region's Party Standing Committee, making him one of the most powerful officials in Inner Mongolia at the time. Between 1993 and 2002, he worked in Beijing as the deputy head of the Central Public Relation Department as a deputy to Ding Guangen.

== Politburo career ==
In 2002, at the 16th Party Congress, Liu became the head of the Central Propaganda Department. Although he also gained a seat on the Politburo at the same time, the overall direction of ideology and propaganda work was 'supervised' by Standing Committee member Li Changchun; thus Liu was, for all intents and purposes, not the top propaganda official in China at the time. Liu also became a Secretary of the Secretariat. He was also a member of the 17th Politburo of the Chinese Communist Party.

During the 2008 financial crisis, Liu touted the Chinese success in responding to the crisis in contrast to Western political gridlock and stated, "Chinese-style socialism has exhibited nonpareil superiority and the China model has demonstrated strong vigor and energy."

After the 18th Party Congress in November 2012, Liu was elected to both the 18th Politburo and its Standing Committee. Liu accumulated a number of high-level positions in addition to his role of overseeing propaganda, including the First Secretary of the Secretariat, which was formerly held by Xi Jinping, who became General Secretary of the Chinese Communist Party, i.e., party leader. Liu, considered a censorship hard-liner, was seen as a staunchly conservative member of the Standing Committee who religiously upheld party orthodoxy. Previously, the top position of the Secretariat and the leading post for propaganda were held by separate people. (Note: At the 16th Party Congress in 2002, Zeng Qinghong held the first-ranked Secretariat position, while Li Changchun was the propaganda chief; at the 17th Party Congress in 2007, Li retained his position, but Xi Jinping became first-ranked Secretary of the Secretariat.)

Several theories had been proposed for Liu's elevation to the Standing Committee. His two-term tenure was often cited as a primary factor. China analyst Cheng Li said that Liu was elevated due to the patronage of former leader Jiang Zemin. Others suggest that Liu was a balancing force in that he had both Communist Youth League experience and loyally upheld party orthodoxy as a conservative. That Liu Yunshan effectively succeeded in the portfolios held by two individuals prior to the Congress was arguably an indication of the breadth of his power. However, unlike his predecessors Xi Jinping and Zeng Qinghong, Liu did not take on the office of Vice President as was customary for the two previous first-ranked Secretaries of the Secretariat, which went to Li Yuanchao. In 2013, Liu was named one of three deputy leaders of the Central Leading Group for Comprehensively Deepening Reforms.

=== Standing Committee member ===
Following the 18th Party Congress, Liu also emerged as the main official in charge of party organization and personnel, as well as the leading official in charge of propagating the mass line education in the party as well as "party building". During this period, Liu had a significant role in promoting the concepts of the China Dream and Xi Jinping Thought.

During the Xi Jinping Administration's crackdown on corruption, which began in 2013, Liu acted as the top official attending the leadership transition meeting in the aftermath of the political 'earthquake' in Shanxi province which saw the removal of a large number of top provincial leaders, including Party Secretary of Shanxi Yuan Chunqing. That a Standing Committee member attended the 'transition meeting' was regarded as extremely unusual, as generally the central authorities in Beijing would dispatch the head of the Organization Department to such an event.

In November 2013, Liu announced that the Central Party School would begin a training program on "General Secretary Xi Jinping's series of important remarks." Within a year, 2,300 cadres had completed the program.

In May 2015, Liu penned an article on Study Times in which he criticized that political culture in the Communist Party must not become too "lax and flexible" and that party members must resolutely follow party rules. Some commentators saw the remarks as implicitly critical of star television host Bi Fujian, who made some comments critical of Mao which surfaced on an online video.

Liu led the Chinese delegation on a visit to North Korea in 2015, and met with Workers' Party first secretary Kim Jong-un, becoming the first Politburo Standing Committee heavyweight to meet with the young North Korean leader. Liu delivered a personal letter from Communist Party general secretary Xi Jinping to Kim Jong-un. Liu and Kim embraced in front of cameras in a show of camaraderie. Liu also accompanied the North Korean leader in watching the military parade marking the 70th Anniversary of the founding of the Workers' Party of Korea. Perhaps due to his wide influence over the portfolios of propaganda and ideology, Liu has played a somewhat unusual role in representing the Chinese leadership in meetings with global technology companies. Liu met with Facebook founder Mark Zuckerberg in March 2016, and Microsoft CEO Satya Nadella in November 2016.

Liu retired at the 19th Party Congress in 2017.

== Criticism ==
Liu Yunshan has been subject to criticism by the writer Tie Liu, whose work has been published by the Independent Chinese PEN Center. In an essay entitled We must Account for Liu Yunshan's Crimes Against Reform, Tie Liu wrote, "Liu Yunshan was the mastermind behind the corruption of China's media organs. He is the arch-nemesis of the path to reform in China, and the biggest opponent of the administration of Xi Jinping and Premier Li Keqiang." Tie Liu also alleged that Liu Yunshan was "morally depraved", and was a supporter of the "Bo Xilai-Zhou Yongkang clique", alluding to Liu as one of China's foremost leftists ("leftists" can also be understood as "Maoists"). Tie Liu also wrote, "for over a decade, with publishing and television all under Liu Yunshan's control, there hasn't been a single newspaper reporting the truth, not a single book that could stand on its feet, and not a single good movie or television series." In the same essay, Tie Liu voiced support for other leaders, such as Xi Jinping, Li Keqiang, and Wang Qishan.

== Family ==
Liu is married to Li Sufang (李素芳), who worked at the Civil Aviation Administration of China. Liu and his wife had two sons, Liu Lefei (刘乐飞) and Liu Letting (刘乐亭). Liu Lefei was, as of 2014, the vice-chairman of CITIC Securities. According to The New York Times, Deutsche Bank offered a job to one of Liu's sons despite the fact that the son "cannot meet our standard" in an effort to hire princelings to gain connections.

His son and daughter-in-law have been named in association with the Panama Papers.

== Notes ==
Party political offices
Preceded by Xi Jinping	Leader of the Central Leading Group for Party Building; 2012–2017	Succeeded by Wang Huning
Preceded by Li Changchun	Chairman of the CCP Central Guidance Commission for Building Spiritual Civilization; 2013–2017	Succeeded by Wang Huning
Preceded by Li Changchun	Leader of the Central Leading Group for Propaganda and Ideological Work; 2013–2017	Succeeded by Wang Huning
Preceded by Ding Guangen	Head of the Publicity Department of the Chinese Communist Party; 2002–2012	Succeeded by Liu Qibao
Academic offices
Preceded by Xi Jinping	President of the Central Party School; 2013–2017	Succeeded by Chen Xi
