= Central Guidance Commission on Building Spiritual Civilization =

Commission of the Central Committee of the Chinese Communist Party

Central Commission for Guiding Cultural and Ethical Progress
- 中央精神文明建设指导委员会

Agency overview
- Formed: 21 April 1997; 29 years ago
- Dissolved: 2023; 3 years ago
- Headquarters: Beijing
- Parent agency: Central Committee of the Chinese Communist Party
- Child agency: Publicity Department of the Chinese Communist Party
- Website: www.wenming.cn

Central Guidance Commission on Building Spiritual Civilization
- Simplified Chinese: 中央精神文明建设指导委员会
- Traditional Chinese: 中央精神文明建設指導委員會
Transcriptions
Standard Mandarin
- Hanyu Pinyin: Zhōngyāng Jīngshénwénmíng Jiànshè Zhǐdǎo Wěiyuánhuì

Commonly abbreviated as
- Chinese: 中央文明委
Transcriptions
Standard Mandarin
- Hanyu Pinyin: Zhōngyāng Wénmíng Wěi

The Central Guidance Commission on Building Spiritual Civilization (CGCBSC), officially known as the Central Commission for Guiding Cultural and Ethical Progress, was a commission of the Central Committee of the Chinese Communist Party. It was tasked with educational efforts to build a "spiritual civilization" (Jingshen Wenming) based on socialism and the goal to build a socialist harmonious society, according to the official Chinese Communist Party (CCP) policy.

== History ==
The commission was established on 21 April 1997.

The commission was disestablished in 2023.

== Functions ==
As one of the most important ideological steering bodies of the CCP and the People's Republic of China, it controlled nationwide propaganda and ideological dissemination, overlapping another similar body, the Leading Group for Propaganda and Ideological Work. Both the Commission and the Leading Group were chaired by the Politburo Standing Committee responsible for propaganda, and overrules the CCP Propaganda Department.

== Chairmen ==
1. Ding Guangen (1997–2002)
2. Li Changchun (2002–2013)
3. Liu Yunshan (2013–2017)
4. Wang Huning (2017–2022)
