= Chen Xi (politician) =

Chinese politician (born 1953)

- 陈希
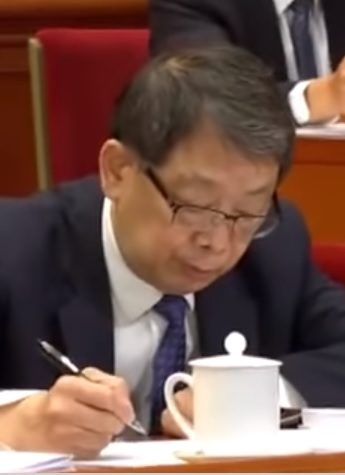
- Chen in 2020

President of the Central Party School
- In office 25 October 2017 – 5 June 2026
- Deputy: He Yiting; Li Shulei; Xie Chuntao (executive)
- General Secretary: Xi Jinping
- Preceded by: Liu Yunshan
- Succeeded by: Cai Qi

Head of the Organization Department of the Chinese Communist Party
- In office 28 October 2017 – 26 April 2023
- Deputy: Jiang Xinzhi (executive)
- General Secretary: Xi Jinping
- Preceded by: Zhao Leji
- Succeeded by: Li Ganjie

Personal details
- Born: 16 September 1953 (age 73) Fuzhou, Fujian, China
- Party: Chinese Communist Party
- Education: Tsinghua University (BS)

Chen Xi (Chinese: 陈希; born 16 September 1953) is a Chinese politician. Between 2017 and 2022, Chen was a member of the Politburo of the CCP and a secretary of the Secretariat of the CCP, serving as the head of the party's Organization Department. A graduate from Tsinghua University, Chen was the CCP committee secretary of the institution from 2002 to 2008. Thereafter he served as a vice-minister of education and vice chairman of the China Association for Science and Technology. He also served as president of the Central Party School of the Chinese Communist Party (CCP) from 2017 to 2026.

== Early life and education ==
Chen traces his ancestry to Putian, Fujian province, and was born on 16 September 1953 in the provincial capital Fuzhou. He worked in his youth at a mechanics factory attached to Fuzhou University, working there from 1970 to 1975. Shortly after the resumption of higher education at the end of the Cultural Revolution, Chen attended Tsinghua University as a Worker-Peasant-Soldier student, where he graduated with a bachelor's degree in chemical engineering in 1978. As an undergraduate at Tsinghua, he was friends with Xi Jinping, a fellow classmate at the time.

Chen joined the Chinese Communist Party (CCP) in November 1978. After graduating from Tsinghua he returned to Fuzhou University to become a lecturer at the Department of Chemical Engineering. In September 1979 he headed back to Tsinghua where he completed a master's degree in chemical engineering. He stayed at Tsinghua to work for the Communist Party and its affiliated Communist Youth League of China (CYCL) as a political organizer. He served as the director of the Sports Department and deputy secretary of the CYLC Tsinghua Committee from 1982 to 1984, and as its secretary from 1984 to 1990.

Between 1990 and 1992 he went on a stint at Stanford University as a visiting scholar for chemical engineering research. In 1992, he became the deputy party secretary of the Chemical Engineering Department at Tsinghua University. Beginning in August 1993, he became the deputy secretary of the party committee at Tsinghua, becoming executive deputy secretary two years later. In 2002 he became secretary of the Tsinghua party committee and concurrently chairman of the University Council.

== Political career ==
In November 2008, Chen became Vice Minister of Education and a deputy party secretary of the ministry, leaving his post at Tsinghua shortly thereafter. In September 2010, Chen was sent to Liaoning to serve as Deputy Communist Party Secretary of the province, where he served for a mere seven months. In April 2011 Chen became the head of the party branch and vice chairman of the China Association for Science and Technology (CAST), succeeding Deng Nan.

In April 2013, following the ascension of Xi Jinping to the posts of General Secretary and President, Chen left his post at CAST and was transferred to become executive deputy head of the Organization Department of the Chinese Communist Party. Chen is widely seen as a confidant and ally of Xi Jinping.

At the 19th Party Congress in October 2017, Chen was named head of the Organization Department of the Chinese Communist Party, placed in charge of party personnel. As was customary for an Organization Department head, he was given a seat on the 19th Politburo of the Chinese Communist Party. Unusually, however, Chen Xi broke nearly thirty years of party precedent by becoming the president of the Central Party School without holding a seat on the Politburo Standing Committee. While this was seen as a "demotion" of the status of the Central Party School, it was also seen as an elevation of Chen's position.

After the 20th Party Congress in October 2022, Chen stepped down as a member of the Politburo and as the head of the Organization Department in April 2023, being succeeded by Li Ganjie. He retained his role as the president of the Central Party School until 5 June 2026, when he was succeeded by Cai Qi.

Chen was a member of the 19th Central Committee of the Chinese Communist Party, and was a member of the 16th and 17th Central Commissions for Discipline Inspection. Beginning in 2013, he also was a member of the Central Leading Group for Inspection Work.

Party political offices
Preceded by Zhao Leji	Head of the Organization Department of the Chinese Communist Party; 2017–2023	Succeeded by Li Ganjie
Preceded by Shen Yueyue	Executive Deputy Head of the Organization Department of the Chinese Communist Party; 2013–2017	Succeeded by Jiang Xinzhi
Preceded by He Meiying	Party Secretary of Tsinghua University; 2002–2008	Succeeded by Hu Heping
Academic offices
Preceded by Liu Yunshan	President of the Central Party School; 2017–2026	Succeeded by Cai Qi
