= Central Party School =

Political training school in Beijing, China

Party School of the Central Committee of the Communist Party of China
- 中国共产党中央委员会党校
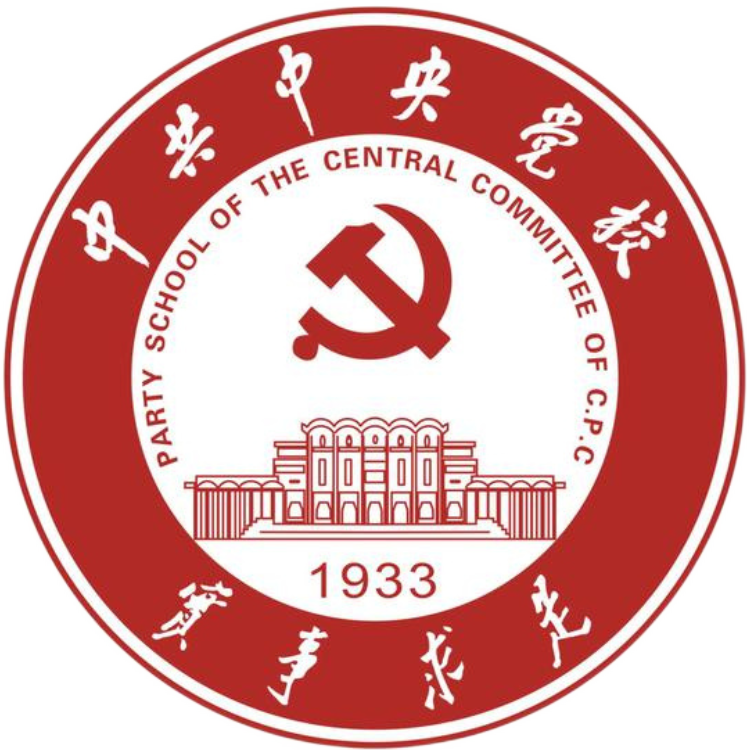
- Motto: 实事求是 (Shí shì qiú shì)
- Motto in English: "Seek truth from facts"
- Type: Higher education institution Ministerial level agency
- Established: 1933; 93 years ago
- Parent institution: Central Committee of the Chinese Communist Party
- President: Cai Qi
- Vice-president: Xie Chuntao (executive)
- Students: 1,300
- Location: 100 Dayouzhuang Street, Haidian District, Beijing, China; 40°00′21″N 116°16′21″E
- Campus: Urban
- Colors
- Website: www.ccps.gov.cn

Chinese name
- Simplified Chinese: 中共中央党校
- Traditional Chinese: 中共中央黨校
- Literal meaning: Central Party School of the Chinese Communist Party
Transcriptions
Standard Mandarin
- Hanyu Pinyin: Zhōnggòng Zhōngyāng Dǎngxiào

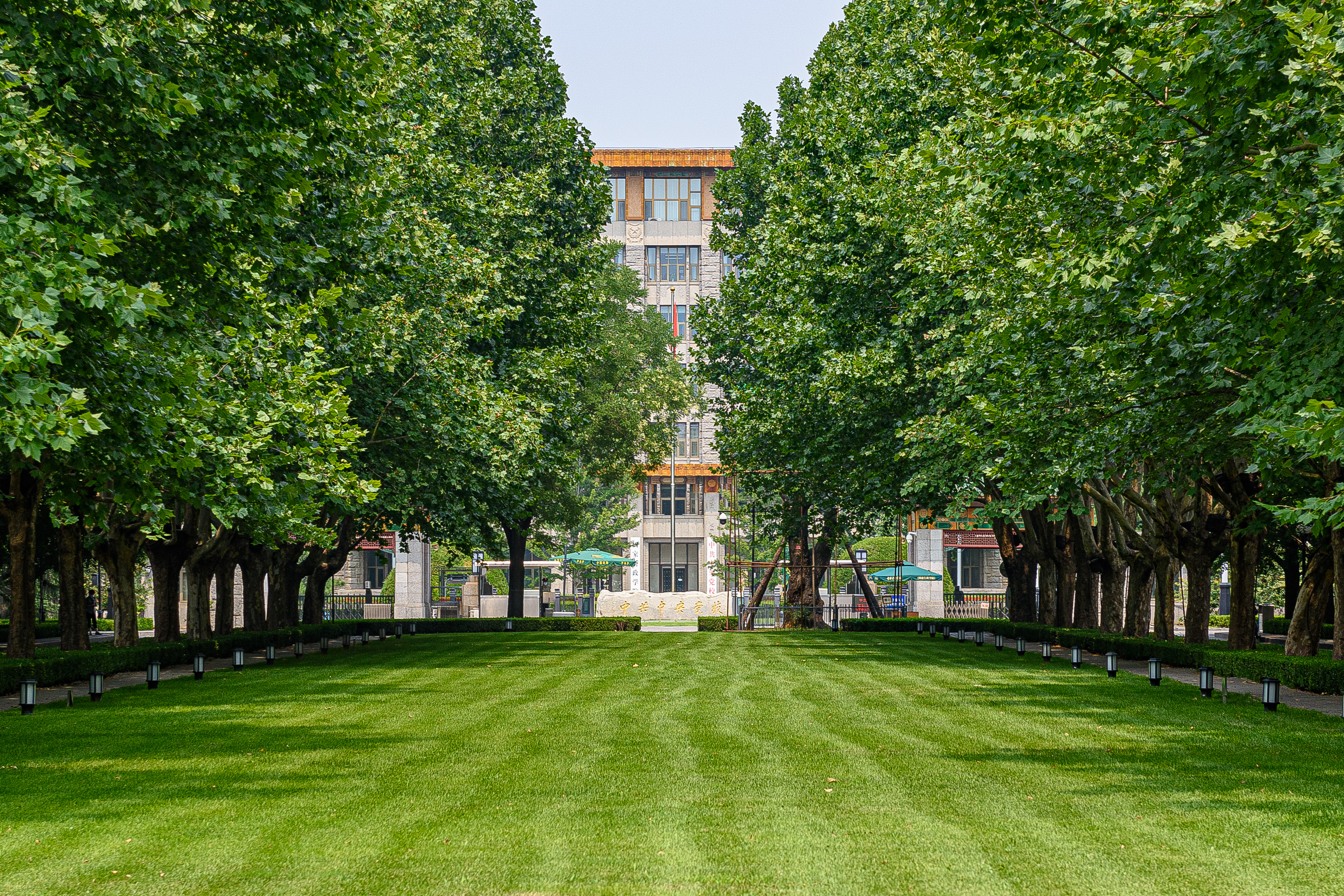
The Campus of the Central Party School, 2022

The Party School of the Central Committee of the Communist Party of China, commonly referred to as the Central Party School, is a higher education institution that trains Chinese Communist Party (CCP) cadres. It is located in Haidian, Beijing, close to the Summer Palace and the Old Summer Palace.

The current president is Cai Qi, the fifth-ranking member of the CCP Politburo Standing Committee.

== History ==
The school was established as the CCP Central Committee's Marx School of Communism (simplified Chinese: 中共中央马克思共产主义学校; traditional Chinese: 中共中央馬克思共產主義學校; pinyin: Zhōnggòng Zhōngyāng Mǎkèsī Gòngchǎnzhǔyì Xuéxiào) in Ruijin, Jiangxi, in 1933. It ceased operations when the Chinese Red Army left on the Long March and was revived once the CCP leadership had arrived and settled in Shaanxi, northwest China, in the winter of 1936. It was then renamed the Central Party School. The school was suspended in 1947 when the CCP retreated from Yan'an. It was re-opened in 1948 in a village in Pingshan County, Hebei, before being moved to Beijing after the CCP captured the city in 1949.

In 1955, the school was re-organized so that it came directly under the jurisdiction of the CCP Central Committee. The school ceased to operate during the Cultural Revolution, before being restored in March 1977.

In 2008, a group of researchers at the school issued a blueprint for political reform, including freedom of the press. In November 2013, Liu Yunshan announced that the Central Party School would begin a training program on "General Secretary Xi Jinping's series of important remarks." Within a year, 2,300 cadres had completed the program. The program was part of the effort to begin formalizing Xi Jinping Thought.

The National Academy of Governance was merged into the Central Party School in March 2018 as part of the deepening the reform of the Party and state institutions. The name of the academy was retained by the Central Party School as a one institution with two names arrangement.

The Central Party School provided US$40 million to build and operate the Mwalimu Julius Nyerere Leadership School, which opened in February 2022 in Tanzania. The school was jointly established with the support of the six ruling parties of Tanzania, South Africa, Mozambique, Angola, Namibia, and Zimbabwe.

== Functions ==
The Central Party School is responsible for training the cadres of the CCP. It is the highest party school among a network of approximately 2,700 party schools. It provides training courses in CCP ideology, governance, and social sciences, and also provides master's and doctoral degrees in the humanities and social sciences. It trains leading cadres at the provincial-ministerial level, department-bureau level, young and middle-aged cadres and ethnic minority cadres, leaders of top state-owned enterprises and centrally managed universities, CCP county secretaries, civil servants from Hong Kong and Macau, and to cadres who specialize in ideology, propaganda and education.

The Party School holds seminars on ideological and political issues, and also employs professors which provide research and consulting services to the central CCP leadership. It also leads and guides the operations, staff and basic text material of the Party Schools at the provincial and county level. The Central Party School publishes the Study Times, which provides an explanation of the relationships between the CCP Central Committee's directives and the underlying political theory and ideology.

== Organization ==
The president of the school heads the Central Party School. From 1989 to 2017, the school was headed by the top-ranked member of the Secretariat, who is concurrently a member of the Politburo Standing Committee. The day-to-day affairs of the school are in practice managed by the executive vice president, who is generally regarded to have the same ranking as a cabinet minister.

=== Presidents ===
Name	Name (Chinese)	Tenure begins	Tenure ends	References
Ren Bishi	任弼时	November 1931	April 1933	
Zhang Wentian	张闻天	April 1933	January 1934	
Li Weihan	李维汉	April 1933	1935	
Dong Biwu	董必武	Late 1935	April 1937	
Li Weihan	李维汉	April 1937	March 1938	
Kang Sheng	康生	March 1938	October 1938	
Chen Yun	陈云	October 1938	December 1941	
Deng Fa	邓发	December 1941	March 1943	
Mao Zedong	毛泽东	March 1943	March 1947	
Liu Shaoqi	刘少奇	July 1948	March 1953	
Kai Feng	凯丰	March 1953	November 1954	
Li Zhuoran	李卓然	November 1954	April 1955	
Yang Xianzhen	杨献珍	April 1955	February 1961	
Wang Congwu	王从吾	February 1961	January 1963	
Lin Feng	林枫	January 1963	January 1966	
Hua Guofeng	华国锋	March 1977	April 1982	
Wang Zhen	王震	April 1982	March 1987	
Gao Yang	高扬	March 1987	March 1989	
Qiao Shi	乔石	March 1989	February 1993	
Hu Jintao	胡锦涛	February 1993	December 2002	
Zeng Qinghong	曾庆红	December 2002	December 2007	
Xi Jinping	习近平	December 2007	December 2012	
Liu Yunshan	刘云山	15 January 2013	25 October 2017	
Chen Xi	陈希	25 October 2017	5 June 2026	
Cai Qi	蔡奇	5 June 2026	Incumbent	

== See also ==
- Ideology of the Chinese Communist Party
- Yan'an Rectification Movement
- "Karl Marx" Party Academy of the Socialist Unity Party of Germany
