= Four Comprehensives =

Chinese policy goals proposed by Xi Jinping

The Four Comprehensives, fully as the Four-pronged Comprehensive Strategy (四个全面战略布局), are four political goals put forward by Xi Jinping, General Secretary of the Chinese Communist Party (CCP) in 2014. They are:

1. Comprehensively build a moderately prosperous society (Note: 全面建成小康社会)
2. Comprehensively deepen reform (Note: 全面深化改革)
3. Comprehensively govern the nation according to law (Note: 全面推进依法治国)
4. Comprehensively strict discipline of the Party. (Note: 全面从严治党)

== Background ==
Some scholars argue that there are the same or very similar statements of the "four comprehensives" in Deng Xiaoping Theory.

The term "moderately prosperous society" dated back to 1979, when Chinese leader Deng Xiaoping said to visiting Japanese Prime Minister Masayoshi Ōhira that "Xiaokang society was the goal of Chinese modernization".

In 1997, the term "building a moderately prosperous society" was officially adopted in General Secretary Jiang Zemin's report to the 15th CCP National Congress.

In 2002, the term was changed to "comprehensively building a moderately prosperous society" in the report to the 16th CCP National Congress.

In 2012, "Completing the Building of a Moderately Prosperous Society in All Respects" was first introduced in Hu Jintao's report to the 18th CCP National Congress.

At the 100th anniversary of the Chinese Communist Party on July 1, 2021, Xi Jinping declared that China achieved its goal of building a moderately prosperous society in all respects. Afterwards, the goal of "comprehensively building a moderately prosperous society" was changed to "comprehensively building a modern socialist country".

== Timeline ==
Xi describes the Four Comprehensives as the communist party's overall guidance strategy and long-term development strategy. The Four Comprehensives have been developed incrementally during the early years of Xi's tenure:

- November 2012: "Comprehensively build a moderately prosperous society" put forward at the 18th Party Congress
- November 2013: "Comprehensively deepen reform" put forward at the 3rd Central Committee Plenum
- early October 2014: "Comprehensively strictly govern the Party" put forward at the summary meeting of the Mass Line Campaign
- late October 2014: "Comprehensively govern the nation according to law" put forward during the 4th Central Committee Plenum
- November 2014: "Three Comprehensives" (absent the Party governance clause) formulated as a strategic bundle during Xi's tour of Fujian Province
- December 2014: "Three Comprehensives" amended to "Four Comprehensives" during Xi's tour of Jiangsu Province
- February 2015: Four Comprehensives unveiled as official Party and national strategy in advance of the Lianghui, the annual sessions of China's National People's Congress and the Chinese People's Political Consultative Conference

== Reactions ==
The “Four Comprehensives” were met with mixed reactions among citizens in China. Many voices associated with the CCP praised Xi's new vision for China, some calling the “Four Comprehensives” “profound strategic thinking” and a “visionary guide for China's future”. The ambiguity of the goals laid out by Xi allows him and other ranking party officials to act under some level of secrecy. While Chinese citizens may not be aware of specific policies being passed, they may be supportive of Xi's goals for China, regardless of whether the policies being passed align with these goals or not. Some of the disdain for Xi's “Four Comprehensives” may also spawn from the ambiguity in the goals. Some citizens were concerned with the actions the party would take to achieve these goals because this was never really made clear.

== See also ==
- Ideology of the Chinese Communist Party
