= Two Centenaries =

Chinese Communist Party goals and deadlines

- Simplified Chinese: 两个一百年
Transcriptions

Flag of the People's Republic of China

Flag of the Chinese Communist Party

The Two Centenaries is a Chinese Communist Party (CCP) term that refers to two 100-year anniversaries and a stated set of economic and political goals advanced by CCP general secretary Xi Jinping following the CCP's 18th National Congress held in 2012. The Chinese government describes the Two Centenaries as the basic foundation for achieving the "Chinese Dream".

== Background ==
The "centenaries" refer to two 100-year anniversaries:

1. The centenary of the founding of the CCP in 1921. According to official CCP discourse, a Xiaokang society will have been achieved at the conclusion of this centenary. While "Xiaokang" – roughly meaning "moderately well-off" – is an abstract theory rooted in Confucianism and socialist ideology, the party has outlined it in terms of doubling of the 2010 per capita income figures.
2. The centenary of the founding of the People's Republic of China in 2049, at which point, China will have become a "strong, democratic, civilized, harmonious, and modern socialist country" according to the People's Daily.

== History of the slogan ==
The concept was first articulated at the 15th Party Congress held in 1997 during the term of then General Secretary Jiang Zemin. Apart from occasional pronouncements in party publications, this concept was not widely discussed again until Xi assumed the party leadership in 2012. Since then, it has become a major part of party slogans, recited in news reports, at conferences, and training sessions for party officials.

According to academic Ding Lu, the "so-called Two Centenary Goals underwrite all China’s long-term economic planning programs and contemporary macroeconomic policy agendas."

China met the first of the two goals, becoming an upper-middle income country and eliminating absolute poverty according to the World Bank criteria.

== Celebratory events ==
=== 100th Anniversary of the Chinese Communist Party (2021) ===
A ceremony which marked the 100th anniversary of the founding of the CCP (Chinese: 中国共产党成立100周年庆祝活动), or the Centennial of the Chinese Communist Party (Chinese: 中国共产党成立一百周年), took place on 1 July 2021. CCP general secretary Xi Jinping delivered a speech in which he specifically announced the realization of the first goal of the Two Centenaries.

"The Great Journey," an art performance, was also held in prior in the Beijing National Stadium to mark the 100th anniversary of the founding of the Chinese Communist Party on 28 June. It was later broadcast by China Media Group on the evening of 1 July 2021.

=== 100th anniversary of the People's Republic of China (2049) ===
The 100th anniversary of the founding of the People's Republic of China (Chinese: 中华人民共和国成立100周年), or the Centennial of the People's Republic of China (Chinese: 中华人民共和国成立一百周年) is expected to fall on 1 October 2049, the National Day of the People's Republic of China.

== Responses ==
A columnist for The Diplomat suggested that Xi's emphasis on these goals gives objective evaluation criteria for the performance of the CCP and that achieving these goals will be a major test to the legitimacy of CCP rule in the country.

== See also ==
- Ideology of the Chinese Communist Party
