= Decision on Several Major Issues Concerning Comprehensively Deepening Reform =

2013 Chinese Communist Party document

The Decision of the Central Committee of the Chinese Communist Party on Several Major Issues Concerning Comprehensively Deepening Reform (Chinese: 中共中央关于全面深化改革若干重大问题的决定) is a document adopted by the 18th Central Committee of the Chinese Communist Party (CCP) on its third plenary session held between 9–12 November 2013.

The Decision was interpreted by the public as "the general program for China's new reform journey". The Decision set certain reform goals for key issues of social concern such as land, finance, taxation, and income distribution and proposed the concept of the "Four Comprehensives" strategic layout after 2014.

== Drafting ==
The head of the drafting group for the Decision was Xi Jinping, general secretary of the Chinese Communist Party, and deputy heads included Liu Yunshan and Zhang Gaoli, members of the Politburo Standing Committee. The document was adapted by the 18th Central Committee on its third plenary session held between 9–12 November 2013. The head and deputy head of the Central Leading Group for Deepening Comprehensive Reform was officially announced on 22 January 2014. Xi Jinping was the head of the group, and the three deputy heads were Li Keqiang, Liu Yunshan and Zhang Gaoli, members of the Politburo Standing Committee.

== Content ==
The full text is divided into 16 sections with a total of 60 articles:

1. The great significance and guiding ideology of comprehensively deepening reform
2. Uphold and improve the basic economic system
3. Accelerate the improvement of the modern market system
4. Accelerate the transformation of government functions
5. Deepen fiscal and taxation system reform
6. Improve the system and mechanism for integrated urban and rural development
7. Building a new open economic system
8. Strengthening the construction of socialist democratic political system
9. Promoting the construction of a rule of law in China
10. Strengthen the system of constraints and supervision on the exercise of power
11. Promote innovation in cultural systems and mechanisms
12. Promoting reform and innovation in social undertakings
13. Innovate the social governance system
14. Accelerate the construction of ecological civilization system
15. Deepening defense and military reform
16. Strengthen and improve the Party's leadership in comprehensively deepening reform

=== Important points ===
Some media summarized the full text and concluded the following important points:

- The reform tasks set out in the Decision will be completed by 2020.
- Let the market play a decisive role in resource allocation
- By 2020, the proportion of dividends paid by state-owned enterprises will be raised to 30%, and non-state capital will be allowed to participate in state-owned capital investment projects
- Promote price reforms in oil, electricity, etc. and liberalize prices in competitive sectors
- Establish a unified urban and rural construction land market
- Allow private capital to establish small and medium-sized banks
- Except for projects related to national security, the government does not need to approve them.
- Gradually abolish administrative levels in scientific research institutions, hospitals and other institutions
- Abolish the labor education system and gradually reduce the number of crimes punishable by death
- Promote the dual leadership system for disciplinary inspection work, with the investigation and handling of corruption cases mainly led by the higher-level disciplinary inspection commissions, and the Central Commission for Discipline Inspection stationing disciplinary inspection agencies in central government agencies.
- Explore the implementation of the official residence system
- Single couples can have two children
- Study and formulate a policy of gradually delaying the retirement age
- Establish the National Security Council
- Reform the petition handling system and implement an online petition handling system
- Cancel the GDP assessment for ecologically fragile poverty-stricken counties
- Establishment of a leading group for deepening comprehensive reform
- Reform and improve the cadre assessment and evaluation system
