= Central Comprehensively Deepening Reforms Commission =

Chinese Communist Party body

- 中央全面深化改革委员会
- Emblem of the Chinese Communist Party

Agency overview
- Formed: November 2013
- Type: Supra-ministerial policy coordination and consultation body on wide-ranging reforms
- Jurisdiction: Chinese Communist Party
- Headquarters: Huairen Hall, Zhongnanhai, Beijing
- Agency executives: Xi Jinping, Leader; Li Qiang, Deputy Leader; Wang Huning, Deputy Leader; Cai Qi, Deputy Leader; Wang Huning, Office Director
- Parent agency: Central Committee of the Chinese Communist Party
- Child agency: Office of the Central Comprehensively Deepening Reforms Commission

Central Comprehensively Deepening Reforms Commission
- Simplified Chinese: 中央全面深化改革委员会
- Traditional Chinese: 中央全面深化改革委員會
Transcriptions
Standard Mandarin
- Hanyu Pinyin: Zhōngyāng Quánmiàn Shēnhuà Gǎigé Wěiyuánhuì

Abbreviation
- Simplified Chinese: 中央深改委
- Traditional Chinese: 中央深改委
Transcriptions
Standard Mandarin
- Hanyu Pinyin: Zhōngyāng Shēngǎiwěi

The Central Comprehensively Deepening Reforms Commission (CCDR), also translated as the Central Commission for Deepening Reform, is a policy formulation and implementation body of the Central Committee of the Chinese Communist Party (CCP) in charge of "Comprehensively Deepening Reforms". These reforms are intended to be even more far-reaching than the previous round of reform and opening up initiated by Deng Xiaoping.

The commission's main task is to determine policy guidelines for reforming the economic, political, cultural, social, ethical and party-building systems in order to address long-term reform issues, as well as to guide reform-related bodies of the CCP at central and local level, and supervise the implementation of reform plans. The CCDR has local branches, which oversee the implementation of policy guidelines issued at the central level.

The CCDR consists entirely of officials of at least "deputy national leader" rank in the official hierarchy. Most of the commission's members are also members of the Politburo of the CCP, a 25-member central decision-making body. Four of the seven members of the Politburo Standing Committee are also part of the group.

== History ==
The commission was originally established as the Central Leading Group for Comprehensively Deepening Reforms (Chinese: 中央全面深化改革领导小组; pinyin: Zhōngyāng Quánmiàn Shēnhuà Gǎigé Lǐngdǎo Xiǎozǔ). The decision to establish the group was announced at the third plenary session of the 18th Central Committee in November 2013, which also approved a Decision of the CCP Central Committee on Comprehensively Deepening Reforms. On 30 December 2013, the Politburo announced that the group had been formed with Xi Jinping, the CCP's General Secretary and China's president, as its leader (zuzhang), and Li Keqiang, Liu Yunshan, and Zhang Gaoli as deputy leaders (fuzuzhang). Observers stated that this would mark a change, as previously policy planning was the domain of the Premier. In March 2018, the leading group is transformed to be a commission as part of the deepening the reform of the Party and state institutions; called the Central Comprehensively Deepening Reforms Commission.

From its first meeting in early 2014 through the end of 2022, the commission convened 66 times, and has deliberated on 542 high-profile policy documents. It met 38 times during Xi's first term and 27 times in his second. Policy documents issued by the CCDR have largely covered policy guidance or long-term plans, with those types accounting for 54% and 25% of CCDR published documents respectively. Over three quarters of publicly released CCDR documents are later formally issued by the CCP Central Committee and the State Council.

== Role ==
The commission has become the primary mechanism for top-level policymaking. Domestic structural issues are its policy focus. The CCDR meets regularly, convening roughly every six to eight weeks. It generally meets seven times annually to discuss policy on six main areas; the economic system and ecological civilization, democracy and the legal system, the cultural system, the social system, Party building, and the discipline inspection system. In practice, the Xi-chaired commission outranks state administration decision-making organs, including the National Development and Reform Commission and the State Council. Despite its powerful influence, the commission is a Party body and does not have the formal authority to make law.

=== Procedure ===
Each year, the CCDR identifies key reform priorities within its designated domains. It deliberates on and approves strategic policies in this area, with the drafting and implementing of policies being delegated to either government ministries or local branches of the commission. These other bodies submit reports to the central commission or the appropriate subgroups for further validation and guidance.

After the process is complete, the finished draft policy document is submitted to the CCDR for formal approval, which is then deliberated and approved during a meeting chaired by Xi and attended by other central leaders and heads of relevant agencies; at this point, the document is considered to have come into effect. Xi additionally gives a speech conveying the "spirit" of the policy and giving guidance for its implementation.

Afterwards, the implementing agencies arrange study sessions in order to develop "understanding" of the policy's "spirit" conveyed during the meeting and Xi's speech. The CCDR regularly reviews reports on the implementation, commonly submitted by local Comprehensively Deepening Reform Commissions. After the reports are presented, the CCDR issues instructions, usually leading to the implementation of new policies.

== Organization ==
The implementation of the CCDR's policy goals is delegated to six "special groups" within the commission. Each office has a specific policy focus, office and a high-ranking director.

- Economic system and ecological civilization reform group
- Democracy and legal system reform special group
- Cultural Reform Commission
- Social system reform special group
- Special Committee for the Reform of the Party Building System
- Discipline inspection system reform special group

The Office of the CCDR is located within the Central Policy Research Office (CPRO), which is itself located within the CCP General Office. The CCDR has local branches at the provincial, city, and county levels, as well as at state-owned enterprises (SOEs), which oversee detailed policy guidance implantation at the local level.

== Membership ==
=== 19th Committee ===
- Leader
  - Xi Jinping (Politburo Standing Committee, Party General Secretary, State President)
- Deputy Leaders
  - Li Keqiang (Politburo Standing Committee, Premier of the State Council)
  - Wang Huning (Politburo Standing Committee, First secretary of the Secretariat)
  - Han Zheng (Politburo Standing Committee, Vice Premier)
- Membership
  - Not yet released publicly
- Office of Deepening Reform
  - Wang Huning, director
  - Mu Hong, executive deputy chief of the General Office (deputy director of the National Development and Reform Commission, minister-level)

=== 20th Committee ===
- Leader
  - Xi Jinping (Politburo Standing Committee, Party General Secretary, State President)
- Deputy Leaders
  - Li Qiang (Politburo Standing Committee, Premier of the State Council)
  - Wang Huning (Politburo Standing Committee, Chairman of the Chinese People's Political Consultative Conference)
  - Cai Qi (Politburo Standing Committee, First Secretary of the Secretariat)
- Membership
  - Not yet released publicly
- Office of Deepening Reform
  - Wang Huning, director

== Meetings ==
=== 18th Central Committee ===
	Date	Content	Ref.
1	22 January 2014	Approved: Working Rules of the Central Leading Group for Comprehensively Deepening Reform; Working Rules of the Special Group of the Central Leading Group for Comprehensively Deepening Reform; "Working Rules of the Office of the Central Leading Group for Comprehensively Deepening Reform"	
2	28 February 2014	Approved; "Key Points of the Central Leading Group for Comprehensively Deepening Reform in 2014"; "Research Opinions on the Requirements and Tasks for Legislative Work Proposed by the Decision of the Third Plenary Session of the 18th CCP Central Committee"; "Report on Major Reforms of the Special Group on Economic System and Ecological Civilization System Reform"; Implementation Plan for Deepening Cultural System Reform; Opinions on Deepening the Reform of the Judicial System and Social System and the Division of Work for Its Implementation; Heard reports on the progress of reform work in various regions and departments since the first meeting of the Central Leading Group for Comprehensively Deepening Reform; Deployed the current and future work	
3	6 June 2014	Considered: Overall Plan for Deepening Fiscal and Taxation System Reform; Opinions on Further Promoting the Reform of the Household Registration System; It is recommended that the proposal be further revised and improved based on the discussion at the meeting and then submitted for approval and implementation in accordance with the procedures. Approved: Framework Opinions on Several Issues Concerning the Pilot Reform of the Judicial System; Shanghai Judicial Reform Pilot Work Plan; "Proposal on the Establishment of an Intellectual Property Court"; Deployed the current and future work	
4	18 August 2014	Considered; Reform Plan for the Remuneration System of the Main Persons in Charge of Centrally Managed Enterprises; "Opinions on Rationally Determining and Strictly Regulating the Remuneration and Business Expenses of Central Enterprise Leaders"; "Implementation Opinions on Deepening the Reform of the Examination and Enrollment System"; It is recommended that the proposal be further revised and improved based on the discussion at the meeting and then submitted for approval and implementation in accordance with the procedures.; Approved; "Guiding Opinions on Promoting the Integrated Development of Traditional and Emerging Media"; "Implementation Plan for Important Reform Measures of the Third Plenary Session of the 18th CCP Central Committee (2014-2020)"; Report on the Progress of Comprehensively Deepening Reform in the First Half of the Year; Summarized the reform work, analyzed the reform situation, and deployed the next stage of work	
5	29 September 2014	Considered: Opinions on guiding the orderly transfer of rural land contract management rights and developing moderate-scale agricultural operations; Pilot Reform Plan for Actively Developing Farmers' Stock Cooperation and Granting Collective Assets Stock Rights; "Plan on Deepening the Reform of Management of Central Finance Science and Technology Plans (Special Projects, Funds, etc.)"; It is recommended that the proposal be further revised and improved according to the discussion at the meeting and then submitted for approval and implementation in accordance with the procedures.	
6	27 October 2014	Considered: Opinions on Strengthening the Construction of Socialist Consultative Democracy; Opinions on the Promotion of the Progress of the China (Shanghai) Pilot Free Trade Zone and Replicable Reform Pilot Experience; The Opinions on Strengthening the Construction of New Think Tanks with Chinese Characteristics was reviewed and approved.; Opinions on Opening Major National Scientific Research Infrastructure and Large Scientific Research Instruments to the Public	
7	2 December 2014	Considered: Opinions on the pilot work of rural land expropriation, collective commercial construction land entering the market, and homestead system reform; "Opinions on Accelerating the Construction of a Modern Public Cultural Service System"; Opinions on Establishing a Parallel System of Civil Servant Positions and Ranks in County-level and Lower-level Agencies; Opinions on Strengthening the Construction of the Central Commission for Discipline Inspection's Resident Institutions; Approved: The Supreme People's Court 's Pilot Program for Establishing Circuit Courts; Pilot Plan for Establishing People's Courts and People's Procuratorates Across Administrative Divisions; It is recommended that the proposal be further revised and improved based on the discussion at the meeting and then submitted for approval and implementation in accordance with the procedures.	
8	30 December 2014	Approved: Summary Report on Comprehensively Deepening Reform in 2014; "Key Points of the Central Leading Group for Comprehensively Deepening Reform in 2015"; "Key Points for Implementing the Important Measures of the Fourth Plenary Session of the 18th CCP Central Committee in 2015"	
9	30 January 2015	Approved: Implementation Plan for Further Deepening the Reform of the Judicial System and Social System by Implementing the Decision of the Fourth Plenary Session of the 18th CCP Central Committee; "Provincial (Autonomous Region, Municipality) Discipline Inspection Commission Secretary and Deputy Secretary Nomination and Examination Methods (Trial)"; "Methods for Nominating and Inspecting the Head and Deputy Head of the Discipline Inspection Group of the Central Commission for Discipline Inspection (Trial Implementation)"; "Methods for Nominating and Inspecting the Secretary and Deputy Secretary of the Discipline Inspection Commission of Centrally Managed Enterprises (Trial Implementation)"	
10	27 February 2015	Approved: Overall Plan for the Reform of Chinese Football; "Regulations on the Recording, Reporting and Accountability of Leading Cadres' Interference in Judicial Activities and Intervention in the Handling of Specific Cases"; Plan for Deepening the Reform of the People's Supervisor System; Opinions of Shanghai on Further Regulating the Management of Business Operations by Spouses, Children and Spouses of Leading Cadres	
11	1 April 2015	Approved: Rural Teachers Support Plan (2015–2020); Guiding Opinions on the Pilot Comprehensive Reform of Urban Public Hospitals; Pilot Reform Plan for the People 's Jury System; Opinions on the People's Courts' Implementation of the Case Registration System Reform; "Implementation Plan for Important Measures of the Fourth Plenary Session of the 18th CCP Central Committee (2015-2020)"	
12	5 May 2015	Approved: "Overall Plan for Systematically Promoting Comprehensive Innovation Reform Experiments in Some Regions"; Pilot Reform Plan for Public Interest Litigation Initiated by Procuratorial Organs; Opinions on Improving the Legal Aid System; Implementation Plan for Deepening Science and Technology System Reform; Implementation Plan for the Expansion of the Pilot Program for Societies Affiliated to the China Association for Science and Technology to Orderly Undertake Government- Transferred Functions	
13	5 June 2015	Approved: Several Opinions on Upholding Party Leadership and Strengthening Party Building in Deepening the Reform of State-owned Enterprises; Opinions on Strengthening and Improving the Supervision of State-owned Assets in Enterprises and Preventing the Loss of State-owned Assets; Opinions on Improving the National Unified Legal Professional Qualification System; Opinions on the Recruitment of Assistant Judges of the People's Courts and Assistant Prosecutors of the People's Procuratorates; Several Provisions on Further Regulating the Contact and Communication Behavior between Judicial Personnel and Parties, Lawyers, Persons with Special Relationships, and Intermediary Organizations	
14	1 July 2015	Approved: Environmental Protection Inspection Program (Trial); Ecological Environment Monitoring Network Construction Plan; Pilot Program for Conducting Outgoing Audits of Natural Resource Assets of Leading Cadres; Measures for the Investigation of Party and Government Leading Cadres’ Accountability for Ecological and Environmental Damage (Trial Implementation); "Guiding Opinions on Promoting State-owned Cultural Enterprises to Put Social Benefits First and Achieve the Unification of Social and Economic Benefits"	
15	18 August 2015	Approved: Opinions on Improving the Mechanism for Reporting to the Standing Committee of the National People's Congress on the Rectification of Outstanding Problems Found in Audits; Several Opinions on Improving the Judicial Responsibility System of the People's Courts; Several Opinions on Improving the Judicial Responsibility System of the People's Procuratorate; Overall Plan for Coordinating and Promoting the Construction of World-Class Universities and First-Class Disciplines; "Special Supervision Measures for Comprehensively Improving the Basic Operating Conditions of Weak Compulsory Education Schools in Poor Areas"; Opinions on Establishing a System for Accepting Lost and Found Reports of Resident Identity Cards in Other Places	
16	15 September 2015	Approved: Opinions on Implementing the Negative List System for Market Access; Opinions on Several Policy Measures to Support the Development and Opening-up of Key Border Areas; Several Opinions on Promoting Price Mechanism Reform; Guiding Opinions on Encouraging and Regulating the Introduction of Non-state Capital into State-owned Enterprise Investment Projects; Opinions on Deepening the Reform of the Lawyer System; Pilot Plan for the Reform of Separate Job Series for Judges and Prosecutors; Pilot Plan for Reform of Judges' and Prosecutors' Salary System; Opinions on Strengthening the Management of Permanent Residence Services for Foreigners	
17	13 October 2015	Approved: Opinions on Strengthening and Improving Administrative Litigation Work; "Plan for Deepening the Reform of the National and Local Tax Collection and Administration System"; Opinions on Further Promoting the Reform and Development of Agricultural Reclamation; Guiding Opinions on the Definition and Classification of the Functions of State-owned Enterprises; Opinions on Improving the Mechanism for Diversified Resolution of Conflicts and Disputes	
18	9 November 2015	Approved: All -China Federation of Trade Unions Reform Pilot Plan; Shanghai Municipal Group Reform Pilot Program; Chongqing Municipal Mass Organization Reform Pilot Plan; Several Opinions on Accelerating the Implementation of the Free Trade Zone Strategy; Several Opinions on Promoting the Innovation and Development of Processing Trade; Plan for Promoting Inclusive Financial Development (2016–2020); Guiding Opinions on Deepening the Reform of Urban Law Enforcement System and Improving Urban Management Work; National High-end Think Tank Construction Pilot Work Plan	
19	9 December 2015	Approved: Pilot Plan for Compiling Lists of Powers and Responsibilities of State Council Departments; Several Opinions on Doing a Good Job in Opening Up Education in the New Era; Opinions on integrating the basic medical insurance system for urban and rural residents; Opinions on Solving the Problem of Household Registration for People Without Household Registration; China's Three-River Source National Park System Pilot Program; "Request for instructions on launching pilot projects for judicial system reform across the country"; Pilot Program for the Reform of the Job Series for Law Enforcement Officers in Public Security Organs; Pilot Program for the Reform of Police Technical Position Series in Public Security Organs; "2015 Work Summary Report of the Central Leading Group for Comprehensively Deepening Reform"; "Key Points of the Central Leading Group for Comprehensively Deepening Reform in 2016"	
20	11 January 2016	Approved: Opinions on Comprehensively Promoting Government Affairs Disclosure; Opinions on Improving the System for State Employees to Learn and Apply the Law; Several Provisions on Protecting and Rewarding Whistleblowers of Occupational Crimes; Guiding Opinions on Launching Pilot Reforms of Public Institutions Undertaking Administrative Functions; Implementation Plan for Deepening Reform of the Science and Technology Association System; "Regulations on Improving and Implementing the Leadership Responsibility System for Comprehensive Social Security Management"; "Opinions on Standardizing the Management of Auxiliary Police Personnel in Public Security Organs"	
21	23 February 2016	The meeting heard: Report of the Special Group on Economic and Ecological Civilization Reform on the Implementation of the Overall Plan for Ecological Civilization Reform; Report of the Special Group on Social System Reform on the Implementation of Judicial System Reform; Report of the Special Group on the Reform of the Party's Discipline Inspection System on the Progress and Implementation of the Reform of the Party's Discipline Inspection System; Report of the Legislative Affairs Commission of the Standing Committee of the National People's Congress on the implementation of legislation to proactively adapt to the needs of reform; Report on the implementation of the Ministry of Science and Technology's deepening reform of the science and technology system; Report of the Ministry of Public Security on the implementation of deepening public security reform; Shanghai's report on the implementation of the central government's reform pilot tasks; Hubei Province's report on the establishment and implementation of the reform implementation supervision mechanism; Report on deepening reform of the medical and health system in Sanming City, Fujian Province; Report on the "multi-plan integration" pilot project in Kaihua County, Zhejiang Province.	
22	22 March 2016	Approved: Opinions on Promoting the Legal Consultant System and the Public Lawyer and Corporate Lawyer System; Opinions on Improving the Ecological Protection Compensation Mechanism; Opinions on Establishing a Poverty Exit Mechanism; Opinions on Strengthening the Reform and Development of Children's Medical and Health Services; Opinions on Deepening the Reform of Investment and Financing Systems; Opinions on Establishing a System for the Gradual Selection of Judges and Prosecutors; Opinions on the open selection of legislators, judges, and prosecutors from lawyers and legal experts; Opinions on Strengthening and Standardizing Reform Pilot Work	
23	18 April 2016	Approved: Provisions of Beijing, Guangdong, Chongqing, and Xinjiang Uygur Autonomous Region on Further Regulating the Business Conduct of Spouses, Children, and Spouses of Leading Cadres (Trial Implementation); Opinions on Establishing a Fair Competition Review System; "Regulations on the Management of Professional and Technical Civil Servants (Trial Implementation)"; Provisions on the Management of Administrative Law Enforcement Civil Servants (Trial Implementation); Guiding Opinions on Promoting Family Doctor Contract Services; Guiding Opinions on Establishing and Improving a Joint Incentive System for Trustworthy and Joint Punishment System for Untrustworthy to Accelerate the Construction of Social Integrity; Opinions on Strengthening Party Building in Private Schools (Trial Implementation); "Implementation Rules for Classification Registration of Private Schools"; "Implementation Rules for the Supervision and Management of For-Profit Private Schools"; Provisions on Protecting Judicial Personnel in the Performance of Their Legal Duties in Accordance with the Law; Ningxia Hui Autonomous Region Spatial Planning (Multi-Plan Integration) Pilot Plan; "Implementation Plan for the Reform Measures of the Fifth Plenary Session of the 18th CCP Central Committee (2016-2020)"	
24	20 May 2016	Approved: Several Opinions on Promoting the Integrated Reform and Development of Urban and Rural Compulsory Education; Opinions on Deepening the Standardization of Public Security Law Enforcement; Opinions on Supporting and Developing Volunteer Service Organizations; "Pilot Plan for Exploring the Implementation of a Crop Rotation and Fallow System"; Opinions on the Development of Foreign-Related Legal Services; "Implementation of supply-side structural reform through reform measures in various regions"	
25	27 June 2016	Approved: "Implementation Opinions on Improving the System for People's Congress Deputies to Connect with the People"; Opinions on Promoting the Reform of the Criminal Procedure System Centered on Trial; "Opinions on Establishing a Unified and Standardized National Ecological Civilization Experimental Zone"; Implementation Plan for the National Ecological Civilization Pilot Zone (Fujian); "Opinions on Accelerating the Construction of Credit Supervision, Warning and Punishment Mechanism for Dishonest Debtors"; Report on the pilot reform of "multi-plan integration" in Hainan Province; Comprehensive Report on the Progress of Comprehensively Deepening Reforms in Various Regions and Work Suggestions in 2015	
26	22 July 2016	Approved: Pilot Plan for Poverty Alleviation Reform through Asset Income from Hydropower and Mineral Resource Development in Poor Areas; Guiding Opinions on Strengthening the Construction of Industry Organizations in the Cultural Sector; Pilot Plan for Reform of the System of Leniency for Guilty and Acceptance of Punishment; Opinions on Establishing a Disciplinary System for Judges and Prosecutors (Trial Implementation); Guiding Opinions on the Pilot Reform of the Vertical Management System for Monitoring, Supervision and Law Enforcement of Environmental Protection Agencies Below the Provincial Level; Report on the Reform Supervision Situation in Various Regions and Departments	
27	30 August 2016	Approved: Guiding Opinions on Building a Green Financial System; Opinions on Improving the Property Rights Protection System and Protecting Property Rights in Accordance with the Law; Guiding Opinions on Innovating the Way Government Allocates Resources; Several Opinions on Implementing a Distribution Policy Oriented towards Increasing the Value of Knowledge; Several Opinions on Further Promoting and Deepening the Experience of Medical and Health System Reform; Measures for the Implementation of the Responsibility System for Poverty Alleviation; Opinions on Improving the Separation of Rural Land Ownership, Contract Rights and Operation Rights; "Implementation Measures for the Compilation of Negative Lists for Industry Access in Key Ecological Functional Areas"; Measures for the Evaluation and Assessment of Ecological Civilization Construction Goals; Report on Pilot Reform of Ecological Environmental Damage Compensation System in Some Provinces; Guiding Opinions on the Reform of Public Institutions Engaged in Production and Business Activities; "Implementation Opinions on Carrying out Lei Feng Volunteer Services in Public Cultural Facilities"; Report on the pilot reform of clearing and standardizing; "Evaluation Report on the Release and Implementation of Important Measures for Comprehensively Deepening Reform"	
28	11 October 2016	Approved: Opinions on Promoting the Reform of the Disaster Prevention, Mitigation and Relief System and Mechanism; Opinions on Comprehensively Implementing the River Chief System; Opinions on Deepening the Reform of the Statistical Management System and Improving the Authenticity of Statistical Data; Guiding Opinions on Further Integrating Socialist Core Values into the Construction of the Rule of Law; Several Opinions on Fully Liberalizing the Elderly Care Service Market and Improving the Quality of Elderly Care Services; Opinions on Promoting Reform and Development in the Field of Work Safety; "Opinions on Promoting the Healthy and Orderly Development of Mobile Internet"; "Guiding Opinions on Deepening the Reform of the Administrative Management System of Economically Developed Towns"; "Overall Plan for Further Improving the Real-Name Registration System in Relevant Fields"; Provincial Spatial Planning Pilot Program	
29	1 November 2016	Approved: "Reform Plan for the Agricultural Subsidy System Oriented towards Green Ecology"; "Guiding Opinions on Further Strengthening and Improving the Promotion of Chinese Culture Globalization"; Opinions on Deepening the Reform of the Professional Title System; Several Opinions on Delineating and Strictly Adhering to the Ecological Protection Red Line; "Request for instructions on the establishment of additional circuit courts by the Supreme People's Court"; "Opinions on Further Guiding and Encouraging College Graduates to Work at the Grassroots Level"; Guiding Opinions on Strengthening the Construction of Government Integrity; Guiding Opinions on Strengthening the Construction of Personal Integrity System; "Guiding Opinions on Comprehensively Strengthening the Construction of Integrity in the Field of E-commerce"; "Measures for the Unified Registration of Natural Resources Rights (Trial Implementation)"; Wetland Protection and Restoration System Plan; Measures for the Protection and Utilization of Coastlines; Report on the implementation of upholding the Party's leadership and strengthening Party building in deepening the reform of state-owned enterprises	
30	5 December 2016	Approved: Several Opinions on Deepening Audit Supervision of State-owned Enterprises and State-owned Capital; "State-owned Assets Supervision and Administration Commission of the State Council's Plan to Promote Functional Transformation Focusing on Capital Management"; Pilot Plan for Improving the National Natural Resource Asset Management System; Overall Plan for Piloting the Reform of Comprehensive Intellectual Property Management; Opinions on Strengthening the Service Capacity Building of Township Governments; Opinions on the Development and Implementation of Elderly Care Service Projects; Interim Measures for the Management of Central State-owned Capital Operation Budget Expenditure; Opinions on Strengthening the Protection of Cultivated Land and Improving the Balance between Occupation and Compensation; Giant Panda National Park System Pilot Program; Pilot Plan for the Northeast Tiger and Leopard National Park System; Measures for the Control of Land Reclamation; "Guiding Opinions on Strengthening the Soft Power Construction of the Belt and Road Initiative" and "Report on the Pilot Situation of Rural Collective Asset Share Rights and Powers Reform"	
31	30 December 2016	Approved: "2016 Work Summary Report of the Central Leading Group for Comprehensively Deepening Reform"; "Key Points of the Central Leading Group for Comprehensively Deepening Reform in 2017"; "Opinions on Accelerating the Construction of Philosophy and Social Sciences with Chinese Characteristics"; Several Opinions on Further Reforming and Improving the Policies on Drug Production, Circulation and Use; Pilot work plan for implementing the administrative law enforcement publicity system, the law enforcement process recording system, and the legal review system for major law enforcement decisions; "Opinions on carrying out pilot work to implement the powers of the board of directors of central enterprises"; "Notice on clearing and standardizing issues related to the linkage between key expenditures and the growth rate of fiscal revenue and expenditure or gross domestic product"; Reform Plan for the Mining Rights Transfer System; Reform Plan for Mineral Resources Royalties System; Opinions on Strengthening and Improving Urban and Rural Community Governance	
32	6 February 2017	Approved: Reform Plan for Building the Industrial Workers Team in the New Era; "Implementation Opinions on Strengthening the Party's Leadership over Local Foreign Affairs System Reform"; "Implementation Opinions on Reforming the Leadership Mechanism, Management System and Supervision Mechanism of Overseas Institutions"; "Implementation Opinions on Reforming the Construction of the External Affairs Team"; "Implementation Opinions on Reforming Foreign Aid Work"; Several Opinions on the Healthy Development of Social Think Tanks; "National Science and Technology Decision-making Consultation System Construction Plan"; Several Opinions on Promoting the Opening of Public Information Resources; Pilot Plan for Setting up Environmental Supervision and Administrative Law Enforcement Agencies by River Basin; Reform Plan for Facilitating Permanent Residence Permits for Foreigners; "Trial Opinions on Deepening the Reform of Personnel Management System for News Gathering, Editing, Broadcasting and Management Posts in Major Central News Organizations"; "Opinions on Implementing the Legal Education Responsibility System of 'Whoever Enforces the Law Should Educate the People About the Law'"; Listened to: Summary Report on the All-China Federation of Trade Unions’ Reform Pilot Work; "Report on the Summary of the Pilot Work of Mass Organization Reform by the Shanghai Municipal Party Committee's Leading Group for Comprehensively Deepening Reform"; "Report of the Chongqing Municipal Party Committee's Leading Group for Comprehensively Deepening Reform on the Summary of the Pilot Work of Mass Organization Reform"	
33	24 March 2017	Approved: Plan for Comprehensively Deepening Reform and Opening-up of the China (Shanghai) Pilot Free Trade Zone; "Plan for Deepening the Reform of the Science and Technology Award System"; The inspection report on the implementation of reforms in the areas of people's livelihood, including the urbanization of migrant workers, improving the schooling conditions for children in poor areas, establishing a system for accepting lost and found identity cards in different places, solving the problem of registering the household registration of people without household registration, promoting family doctor contract services, and comprehensively implementing the river chief system, was reviewed.	
34	18 April 2017	Approved: Opinions on Accelerating the Construction of a Policy System and Cultivating New Agricultural Business Entities; Opinions on Further Stimulating and Protecting Entrepreneurship; Guiding Opinions on Establishing a Modern Hospital Management System; "Implementation Opinions on Reforming and Improving the Supply Guarantee Mechanism for Shortage Drugs"; "Regulations on Several Issues Concerning the Strict Exclusion of Illegal Evidence in Handling Criminal Cases"; Opinions on Improving the Regulatory System and Mechanism for Anti-Money Laundering, Anti-Terrorist Financing and Anti-Tax Evasion; "Measures for the Evaluation of Provincial People's Governments' Performance of Educational Responsibilities"; Implementation Plan on Prohibiting the Import of Foreign Waste and Promoting the Reform of the Solid Waste Import Management System; Reviewed the report on the reform supervision work carried out by the six special groups of the Central Leading Group for Comprehensively Deepening Reform	
35	23 May 2017	Approved: Opinions on Deepening the Reform of Educational Systems and Mechanisms; Catalogue of Industries for Guiding Foreign Investment ( Revised in 2017); Several Opinions on Regulating Overseas Business Operations of Enterprises; Several Opinions on Establishing a Long-term Mechanism for Monitoring and Early Warning of Resource and Environmental Carrying Capacity; Opinions on Deepening Environmental Monitoring Reform and Improving the Quality of Environmental Monitoring Data; Overall Plan for the Construction of Personal Income and Property Information System; Pilot Program for Inter-regional Environmental Protection Agencies; Opinions on the Paid Use of Sea Areas and Uninhabited Islands; "Report on the pilot program of public interest litigation initiated by the procuratorate and suggestions for the next step of work."; The meeting considered: Report on the implementation of General Secretary Xi Jinping's important speech at the 33rd meeting of the Central Leading Group for Comprehensively Deepening Reforms by various regions and departments; Report on Deepening Comprehensive Reform in the Education Sector; Report on key reform work in the field of science and technology; Report on the Progress of Deepening the Reform of the Medical and Health System; Report on key reform work in the football field	
36	26 June 2017	Approved: Qilian Mountain National Park System Pilot Plan; Implementation Plan for the Corporate Restructuring of Central Enterprises; Reform Plan for Unified Calculation of Regional Gross Domestic Product; "Recommended Measures for Disciplinary Action against Persons Responsible for Statistical Violations"; Overall Plan for China International Import Expo; Several Opinions on Improving the Security of Overseas Enterprises and Outbound Investment; National and Local Balance Sheet Preparation Work Plan; "Plan for the Establishment of Hangzhou Internet Court"; Interim Provisions on the Outgoing Audit of Natural Resource Assets of Leading Cadres; "Implementation Plan for the National Ecological Civilization Pilot Zone (Jiangxi)"; The meeting reviewed the implementation plan for the National Ecological Civilization Pilot Zone (Guizhou); Report on the Progress of Construction of the National Ecological Civilization Pilot Zone (Fujian); "Summary Report on the Two-Year Progress of the Construction of China (Guangdong), China (Tianjin) and China (Fujian) Free Trade Pilot Zones"	
37	19 July 2017	Approved: Opinions on Innovating Systems and Mechanisms to Promote Green Development of Agriculture; National Technology Transfer System Construction Plan; Implementation Plan for Deepening the Reform of the Corporate Governance Structure of Public Cultural Institutions; Several Opinions on Strengthening and Improving Cultural and People-to-People Exchanges between China and Foreign Countries; Provisions on the Administration of Contract Civil Servants (Trial Implementation); Opinions on Improving the Early Warning and Rapid Response Supervision System for Quality and Safety Risks of Imported and Exported Goods to Effectively Protect Consumer Rights and Interests; Opinions on Deepening the Reform of the Review and Approval System to Encourage Innovation in Drugs and Medical Devices; Overall Plan for Establishing a National Park System; "Implementation Opinions on Improving a Unified Judicial Appraisal Management System".; The meeting considered: Report on the Progress of Reform Pilot Work since the Third Plenary Session of the 18th CCP Central Committee; Report on the Supervision of Social Security System Reform	
38	29 August 2017	Approved: Several Opinions on Improving the Strategy and System of Major Functional Areas; Opinions on Exploring the Establishment of a Long-term Mechanism for the Coordination and Integration of Agricultural Funds; Reform Plan for the Ecological Environmental Damage Compensation System; Guiding Opinions on Establishing and Improving the Village Affairs Supervision Committee; Opinions on Strengthening the Regularization, Specialization and Professionalization of Judges and Prosecutors and Fully Implementing the Judicial Responsibility System; The Framework Opinions on Shanghai's Pilot Comprehensive Reform of the Judicial System.; "Inspection Report on the Implementation of the Measures for the Implementation of the Responsibility System for Poverty Alleviation"; Report on the pilot work of spatial planning (integration of multiple plans) in Ningxia Hui Autonomous Region	

=== 19th Central Committee (before reorganization) ===
	Date	Content	Ref.
1	20 November 2017	Approved: "Opinions on establishing a system for the State Council to report on the management of state-owned assets to the Standing Committee of the National People's Congress"; Guiding Opinions on Strengthening the Selection and Management of Resident Working Teams in Poverty-stricken Villages; Three-Year Action Plan for Improving Rural Living Environment; Guiding Opinions on Implementing the Lake Chief System in Lakes; Opinions on Comprehensively Deepening the Reform of Teacher Team Building in the New Era; "Request for Expanding the Pilot Reform of the Rural Homestead System"; Opinions on Reforming and Improving the Incentive Mechanism for the Training and Employment of General Practitioners; Reform Plan of the Central Youth League School; "Working Standards for the Argumentation and Consultation of Major Interest Adjustments Involved in Legislation"; "Working Guidelines for Introducing Third-Party Evaluations on Important Legislative Matters with High Controversy"; Opinions on Strengthening Reform and Innovation in the Field of Intellectual Property Trial; Opinions on Implementing the Spirit of the 19th CCP National Congress and Pushing Reforms Forward; Summary of the Work of the Central Leading Group for Comprehensively Deepening Reform; "Working Rules of the Central Leading Group for Comprehensively Deepening Reform (Revised Draft)"; "Working Rules of the Special Group of the Central Leading Group for Comprehensively Deepening Reform (Revised Draft)"; "Working Rules of the Office of the Central Leading Group for Comprehensively Deepening Reform (Revised Draft)"; Considered: Report on Intensifying Supervision and Implementing Reforms	

=== 19th Central Committee (after reorganization) ===
	Date	Content	Ref.
1	28 March 2018	Approved: Working Rules of the Central Committee for Comprehensively Deepening Reform; Working Rules of the Special Group of the Central Committee for Comprehensively Deepening Reform; "Working Rules of the Office of the Central Commission for Comprehensively Deepening Reform"; Guiding Opinions on Further Promoting the Convenience of Approval Services; "Proposal on the Establishment of the Shanghai Financial Court"; Opinions on forming a mechanism for participating in international macroeconomic policy coordination and promoting the improvement of the international economic governance structure; Plan for Further Deepening Reform and Opening-up of the China (Guangdong) Pilot Free Trade Zone; Plan for Further Deepening Reform and Opening-up of the China (Tianjin) Pilot Free Trade Zone; Plan for Further Deepening Reform and Opening-up of the China (Fujian) Pilot Free Trade Zone; Guiding Opinions on Regulating the Asset Management Business of Financial Institutions; Guiding Opinions on Strengthening Supervision of Non-financial Enterprises’ Investment in Financial Institutions; Opinions on Reforming the Wage Determination Mechanism of State-owned Enterprises; "Reform Plan for the Job Series of Law Enforcement Officers in Public Security Organs (Trial Implementation)"; "Reform Plan for Police Technical Positions in Public Security Organs (Trial Implementation)"; Several Opinions on Deepening the Reform of Project Review, Talent Evaluation, and Institutional Assessment; Several Opinions on Further Strengthening the Construction of Scientific Research Integrity; Opinions on Strengthening Party Building in Public Hospitals; The Opinions on Strengthening the Construction of the People's Mediation Team were reviewed.; Report on Deepening the Reform of the Discipline Inspection and Supervision System and the Central Commission for Discipline Inspection and the National Supervisory Commission; Report on the Summary of the First Round of Central Environmental Protection Inspection and Considerations for the Next Steps	
2	11 May 2018	Approved: Guiding Opinions on Issues Related to Local Institutional Reform; Guiding Opinions on Strengthening Asset-Liability Constraints of State-Owned Enterprises; "Opinions on Promoting the Pilot Program of Centralized and Unified Supervision of Business-related State-owned Assets of Central Party and Government Organs and Institutions"; Guiding Opinions on the Reform of the Enterprise System of Institutions of Higher Education; "Plan for the Central Adjustment System of Basic Pension Insurance Funds for Enterprise Employees"; Regulations on the Management of Leading Personnel of Central Enterprises; Opinions on strengthening and improving the rescue and management of homeless vagrants and beggars; Guiding Opinions on Reforming and Improving the Comprehensive Regulatory System for the Medical and Health Industry; "Request for instructions on the adjustment of the division of labor for reform tasks since the 18th CCP National Congress"; The Implementation Plan for Important Reform Measures in the Report of the 19th CCP National Congress (2018–2022) was reviewed.; Report on the Progress of Deepening the Reform of Party and State Institutions	
3	6 July 2018	Approved: Guiding Opinions on Supporting Hebei Xiong'an New Area to Comprehensively Deepen Reform and Expand Opening-up; Guiding Opinions on the Pilot Project of Building New Era Civilization Practice Centers; "Opinions on Regulating the Development of Off-campus Training Institutions"; Several Opinions on Deepening Reform and Regulating the Development of Preschool Education; Opinions on Comprehensively Implementing Budget Performance Management; Several Opinions on Improving the System and Mechanism for Promoting Consumption and Further Stimulating the Consumption Potential of Residents; Implementation Plan for Improving the System and Mechanism for Promoting Consumption (2018–2020); Guiding Opinions on Establishing and Improving the Basic Public Service Standard System; Several Opinions on Strengthening the Reform of Cultural Relics Protection and Utilization; Guiding Opinions on Promoting Third-Party Performance Evaluation of Government Purchased Services; "Regulations on the Supervision of Preventing and Punishing Statistical Fraud and Falsification"; "List of issues and work suggestions that need to be addressed at the central level in deepening the "one-stop reform in Zhejiang and other places"; "Implementation Opinions on Carrying out a Pilot Program for the Grade Promotion System for Management Staff in Institutions Below the County Level"; Opinions on Several Fiscal Policies to Promote the In-depth Development of Military-Civilian Integration; "Plan for the Establishment of Beijing Internet Court and Guangzhou Internet Court"; "Plan for the Establishment of the Public Interest Litigation Procuratorate of the Supreme People's Procuratorate"	
4	20 September 2018	Approved: Opinions on Promoting High-quality Development; "Opinions on establishing a more effective new mechanism for regional coordinated development"; Several measures to support the free trade pilot zones in deepening reform and innovation; Guiding Opinions on Improving the Supervision of Systemically Important Financial Institutions; Opinions on Reforming and Improving the Vaccine Management System; Opinions on unifying the planning system to better play the strategic guiding role of national development planning; "Opinions on Promoting the Organic Connection between Small Farmers and Modern Agricultural Development"	
5	14 November 2018	Approved: Hainan Province's Innovation-Driven Development Strategy Implementation Plan; Implementation Plan for Building an International Tourism Consumption Center in Hainan Province; "Implementation Plan on Fiscal and Taxation Policies to Support Hainan's Comprehensive Deepening of Reform and Opening-up"; "Administrative Measures for Comprehensive Financial Subsidy Funds to Support Hainan's Comprehensive Deepening of Reform and Opening-up"; Work Plan on Adjusting Hainan's Duty-Free Shopping Policy for Off-Island Passengers; Plan for Accelerating the Improvement of the Market Entity Exit System Reform; Plan for Deepening the Reform of Government Procurement System; National Vocational Education Reform Implementation Plan; Opinions on Strengthening the Construction of County-level Media Integration Centers; Opinions on Deepening Reforms to Cultivate World-Class Scientific and Technological Journals; "Implementation Opinions on Promoting the Integration of Approval, Service and Law Enforcement Forces at the Grassroots Level"; Opinions on Strengthening and Improving Publishing Work; National Organized Drug Centralized Procurement Pilot Program; Guiding Opinions on Comprehensively Implementing the Administrative Law Enforcement Publicity System and the Law Enforcement Process Recording System and the Legal Review System for Major Law Enforcement Decisions; "Streets and townships blow the whistle, departments report" - Beijing's exploration of promoting party building to lead the innovation of grassroots governance systems and mechanisms	
6	23 January 2019	Approved: Overall Implementation Plan for Establishing a Science and Technology Innovation Board and Piloting a Registration System at the Shanghai Stock Exchange; Implementation Opinions on Establishing a Science and Technology Innovation Board and Piloting a Registration System at the Shanghai Stock Exchange; Guiding Opinions on Establishing a Natural Conservation Area System with National Parks as the Main Body; Opinions on Deepening Education and Teaching Reform and Comprehensively Improving the Quality of Compulsory Education; Opinions on Encouraging and Guiding Talents to Flow to Hardship-prone and Remote Areas and Grassroots Frontlines; "Implementation Opinions on Comprehensively Deepening Reform in the Political and Legal Fields"; Guiding Opinions on Coordinating and Promoting the Reform of the Property Rights System of Natural Resource Assets; Several Opinions on Establishing a National Land Space Planning System and Supervising Its Implementation; Guiding Opinions on Building a Market-Oriented Green Technology Innovation System; Natural Forest Protection and Restoration System Plan; Implementation Plan for the National Ecological Civilization Pilot Zone (Hainan); Hainan Tropical Rainforest National Park System Pilot Plan; "Key Points of the Central Committee for Comprehensively Deepening Reform in 2019"; "2018 Work Summary Report of the Central Committee for Comprehensively Deepening Reform"; Summary and Assessment Report on the Implementation of Comprehensively Deepening Reforms since the 18th CCP National Congress	
7	19 March 2019	Approved: Guiding Opinions on Promoting the New Pattern of Western Development in the New Era; Several Opinions on Expanding the Research Autonomy of Universities and Research Institutions; Guiding Opinions on Promoting the Deep Integration of Artificial Intelligence and the Real Economy; Guiding Opinions on Strengthening and Improving Rural Governance; Guiding Opinions on Deepening the Integration and Sharing of Public Resource Trading Platforms; Implementation Opinions on Reform of Oil and Gas Pipeline Network Operation Mechanism; Opinions on Accelerating the Construction of a Public Legal Service System; Opinions on Deepening the Reform of Fire Law Enforcement	
8	29 May 2019	Approved: Guiding Opinions on Innovating and Improving Macroeconomic Control; Opinions on carrying out a pilot project on comprehensive reform of energy revolution in Shanxi; Opinions on Deepening Comprehensive Reform of the Film and Television Industry and Promoting the Healthy Development of my country's Film and Television Industry; Several Opinions on Strengthening Open Cooperation in Innovation Capabilities; Reform Plan for Managing High-Value Medical Consumables; Several Opinions on Reforming and Improving the System and Mechanism to Strengthen the Safety Management of Grain Reserves; Guiding Opinions on Improving the Secondary Market for Transfer, Leasing and Mortgage of Construction Land Use Rights; Guiding Opinions on Accelerating the High-Quality Development of Agricultural Insurance; "Guiding Opinions on Further Promoting the Transformation of Customs and Building a Civilized Rural Culture"; Report on the implementation of the spirit of the Central Committee's meeting on deepening reform and deepening reform supervision work by various regions and departments	
9	24 July 2019	Approved: Plan for the Establishment of the National Science and Technology Ethics Committee; Opinions on Strengthening Intellectual Property Protection; "Opinions on Promoting the Inheritance and Innovation of Traditional Chinese Medicine"; Guiding Opinions on Deepening the Reform of Rural Public Infrastructure Management System; "Construction Plan for the Great Wall, Grand Canal and Long March National Cultural Parks"; Guiding Opinions on Coordinating the Delineation and Implementation of Three Control Lines in National Land Space Planning; "Opinions on Accelerating the Establishment of a Comprehensive Network Governance System"; Pilot Work Plan for the Construction of Regional Medical Centers; "National Industry-Education Integration Construction Pilot Implementation Plan"; Opinions on supporting Shenzhen in building a pilot demonstration zone of socialism with Chinese characteristics; Overall Plan for the Construction of China -Shanghai Cooperation Organization Local Economic and Trade Cooperation Demonstration Zone	
10	9 September 2019	Approved: "Implementation Opinions on Promoting the Deep Integration and Development of Advanced Manufacturing and Modern Service Industries"; "Opinions on Creating a Better Development Environment to Support the Reform and Development of Private Enterprises"; Guiding Opinions on Promoting High-Quality Development of Trade; Opinions on Promoting the Reform of the System and Mechanism for the Social Mobility of Labor and Talents; Several Opinions on Reducing the Burden on Primary and Secondary School Teachers and Further Creating a Good Education and Teaching Environment; Guiding Opinions on Implementing the Strategy for Securing Important Agricultural Products; Work Plan for Coordinated Supervision of Financial Infrastructure; Opinions on Strengthening Technological Innovation to Support the Construction of a Safe China; Overall Plan for Creating a Green Lifestyle; Interim Provisions on the Responsibilities of State-owned Financial Capital Investors; Opinions on Further Strengthening Plastic Pollution Control	
11	26 November 2019	Approved: Opinions on Building a More Perfect System and Mechanism for Market-Based Allocation of Factors; Opinions on Improving the Agricultural Support and Protection System; Opinions on Deepening the Reform of my country's Medical Insurance System; "Opinions on Comprehensively Strengthening Labor Education in Colleges, Middle Schools and Primary Schools in the New Era"; Guiding Opinions on Building a Modern Environmental Governance System; "Opinions on Deepening the Reform of the Education Supervision System and Mechanism in the New Era"; Several Opinions on Strengthening the Construction of Socialized Agricultural Science and Technology Service System; "Division of work for the implementation of important measures of the Decision of the Fourth Plenary Session of the 19th CCP Central Committee by relevant central departments"; "Evaluation Report on Comprehensively Deepening Reforms Since the Third Plenary Session of the 18th CCP Central Committee"	
12	14 February 2020	The meeting approved: "2019 Work Summary Report of the Central Committee for Comprehensively Deepening Reform"; "Key Points of the Central Committee for Comprehensively Deepening Reform in 2020"; Opinions on Accelerating the Improvement of the Socialist Market Economic System in the New Era; "National Coordination Reform Plan for Enterprise Employees' Basic Pension Insurance"; Implementation Plan for the Pilot Program of Granting Researchers Ownership or Long-term Use Rights of Their Scientific and Technological Achievements; Guiding Opinions on Deepening the Pilot Reform of Public Institutions; Opinions on Deepening the Pilot Work of Building National High-end Think Tanks; Opinions on Promoting High-quality Development of Infrastructure; Guiding Opinions on Further Promoting the Reform, Opening-up and Development of the Service Industry	
13	27 April 2020	The meeting approved: Implementation Plan for Improving the Public Health Emergency Material Security System; Guiding Opinions on Promoting the Reform of the Medical Insurance Fund Supervision System; Overall Implementation Plan for the Reform of the Growth Enterprise Market and the Pilot Registration System; Overall Plan for Major Projects for the Protection and Restoration of Important Ecosystems in China (2021–2035); "Opinions on Deepening the Integration of Sports and Education to Promote the Healthy Development of Youth"; "Implementation Plan for Important Reform Measures of the Fourth Plenary Session of the 19th CCP Central Committee (2020-2021)"	
14	30 June 2020	The meeting approved: Three-Year Action Plan for State-Owned Enterprise Reform (2020–2022); Guiding Opinions on Deepening the Integration and Development of New Generation Information Technology and Manufacturing; "Pilot Plan for Deepening the Reform of Rural Homestead System", "Guiding Opinions on Accelerating the Development of Deep Media Integration"; "Overall Plan for Deepening Education Evaluation Reform in the New Era"; "Implementation Opinions on Deepening the Reform of State-owned Art Institutions"; The meeting heard a report on the progress of the reform of the medical and health system since the Third Plenary Session of the 18th CCP Central Committee	
15	1 September 2020	The meeting approved: Implementation Opinions on Promoting Innovation and Development of Foreign Trade; Several Opinions on Revitalizing Higher Education in Central and Western China in the New Era; "Implementation Opinions on Regulating the Development of Private Compulsory Education"; Guiding Opinions on Further Standardizing Medical Practices and Promoting Reasonable Medical Examinations; The meeting on "Several Opinions on Further Promoting the Classification of Domestic Waste" heard a report on the progress of rural reform since the Third Plenary Session of the 18th CCP Central Committee	
16	2 November 2020	The meeting approved: Opinions on Promoting the Optimization of the Layout and Structural Adjustment of the State-owned Economy in the New Era; Action Plan for Building a High-Standard Market System; Decision of the Standing Committee of the National People's Congress on Strengthening Supervision of State-owned Assets Management; Opinions on Promoting the Healthy Development of Elderly Care and Childcare Services; Opinions on Comprehensively Implementing the Forest Chief System; Guiding Opinions on Cultural Enterprises Adhering to the Correct Orientation and Fulfilling Social Responsibilities; Implementation Plan for Improving the Delisting Mechanism for Listed Companies; The meeting on "Several Opinions on Strictly Cracking Down on Securities Illegal Activities in Accordance with the Law" heard a report on the progress of comprehensive reforms in the education sector since the Third Plenary Session of the 18th CCP Central Committee.	
17	30 December 2020	The meeting reviewed the summary and evaluation report on comprehensively deepening reform since the Third Plenary Session of the 18th CCP Central Committee The meeting approved: Several Opinions on Integrating Party Leadership into Corporate Governance of Central Enterprises (Trial Implementation); Guiding Opinions on Accelerating the Establishment and Improvement of a Green, Low-Carbon, Circular Development Economic System; Reform Plan for the Legal Disclosure of Environmental Information; Opinions on establishing and improving a coordination mechanism for government data sharing to accelerate the orderly sharing of data; Opinions on Further Deepening the Reform of the Budget Management System; Opinions on Strengthening and Improving Ideological and Political Work in the New Era; Opinions on Further Optimizing Tax Law Enforcement Methods; "Proposal on the Establishment of the Beijing Financial Court"	
18	19 February 2021	The meeting approved: "2020 Work Summary Report of the Central Committee for Comprehensively Deepening Reforms"; "Key Points of the Central Committee for Comprehensively Deepening Reform in 2021"; Opinions on Improving the Price Control Mechanism for Important Livelihood Commodities; Opinions on Promoting the High-Quality Development of Public Hospitals; Opinions on Establishing a Grade Promotion System for Management Staff in Institutions Below the County Level; "Implementation Opinions on Comprehensively Strengthening Drug Regulatory Capacity Building"; Opinions on Establishing and Improving the Mechanism for Realizing the Value of Ecological Products; Opinions on Continuously Preventing and Rectifying the Problem of "Village Bullies"; Opinions on Strengthening Litigation Source Governance and Promoting the Resolution of Conflicts and Disputes at the Source	
19	21 May 2021	The meeting approved: Guiding Opinions on Improving the Evaluation Mechanism for Scientific and Technological Achievements; "Opinions on Further Reducing the Burden of Homework and Off-campus Training for Students in Compulsory Education"; Pilot Plan for Deepening Medical Service Price Reform; Opinions on Deepening the Reform of Ecological Protection Compensation System; Several Opinions on Strengthening the Protection and Inheritance of Historical Culture in Urban and Rural Construction	
20	9 July 2021	The meeting approved: Guiding Opinions on Accelerating the Construction of a New Development Pattern; Action Plan for Revitalizing the Seed Industry; Qinghai-Tibet Plateau Ecological Environment Protection and Sustainable Development Plan; Several Measures on Promoting Reform and Innovation in Trade and Investment Facilitation in Pilot Free Trade Zones	
21	30 August 2021	The meeting approved: Opinions on Strengthening Anti-monopoly and Deepening the Implementation of Fair Competition Policies; Several Opinions on Reforming and Improving the System and Mechanism to Strengthen the Safety Management of Strategic and Emergency Material Reserves; Opinions on Deepening the Battle Against Pollution; Opinions on More Effectively Playing the Role of Statistical Supervision Functions	
22	24 November 2021	The meeting approved: Three-Year Plan for Science and Technology System Reform (2021–2023); Guiding Opinions on Accelerating the Construction of a National Unified Electricity Market System; "Opinions on Establishing a Principal Responsibility System Under the Leadership of Party Organizations in Primary and Secondary Schools (Trial Implementation)"; "Implementation Opinions on Bringing Cultural Relics to Life and Expanding the International Influence of Chinese Culture"; Several measures to support the Zhongguancun National Independent Innovation Demonstration Zone in carrying out pilot reforms to promote high-level scientific and technological self-reliance	
23	17 December 2021	The meeting approved: Opinions on Accelerating the Construction of a National Unified Market; "Guiding Opinions on Further Improving Government Regulatory Effectiveness and Promoting High-Quality Development"; Several Opinions on Further Promoting the Construction of World-Class Universities and First-Class Disciplines; Guiding Opinions on Strengthening the Governance of Science and Technology Ethics; Opinions on Promoting the Development of Personal Pension Funds	
24	28 February 2022	Approved at the meeting: Guiding Opinions on Accelerating the Construction of World-Class Enterprises; Implementation Opinions on Promoting High-Quality Development of Inclusive Finance; Opinions on Strengthening the Training of Talents in Basic Disciplines; "Guiding Opinions on Promoting State-owned Enterprises to Build Original Technology Sources"	
25	19 April 2022	Approved at the meeting: Guiding Opinions on Strengthening the Construction of Digital Government; "Guiding Opinions on Further Promoting the Reform of the Fiscal System Below the Provincial Level"; "Opinions on Establishing and Improving an Evaluation Index System for the Outgoing Audit of Natural Resource Assets of Leading Cadres"; "Work Plan for Improving the Financial Support Innovation System during the 14th Five-Year Plan Period"; Several Opinions on Improving the Science and Technology Incentive Mechanism	
26	22 June 2022	The meeting approved: Opinions on Building a Data Infrastructure System to Better Play the Role of Data Elements; Opinions on Strengthening and Improving Administrative Division Work; "Work Plan for Pilot Reform of Science and Technology Talent Evaluation"; Work Plan for Strengthening Supervision of Large Payment Platform Companies and Promoting Standardized and Healthy Development of Payment and Financial Technology	
27	6 September 2022	The meeting approved: Opinions on Improving the New National System for Tackling Key Core Technologies under the Socialist Market Economy; Several Opinions on Deepening the Reform of the Academician System; Opinions on Comprehensively Strengthening Resource Conservation Work; Guiding Opinions on Deepening the Pilot Program of Rural Collective Commercial Construction Land Marketization; Opinions on Further Deepening Reforms to Promote the Healthy Development of Rural Medical and Health Systems	

=== 20th Central Committee ===
	Date	Content	Ref.
1	21 April 2023	The meeting approved: Opinions on strengthening the leading role of enterprises in scientific and technological innovation; Opinions on strengthening and improving the management of state-owned economy to effectively support China's modernization drive; Opinions on Promoting the Development and Growth of the Private Economy; Working Rules of the Central Committee for Comprehensively Deepening Reform; Working Rules of the Special Group of the Central Committee for Comprehensively Deepening Reform; "Working Rules of the Office of the Central Commission for Comprehensively Deepening Reform"; "Key Points of the Central Committee for Comprehensively Deepening Reform in 2023"	
2	11 July 2023	The meeting approved: Opinions on Building a New Open Economy System at a Higher Level and Promoting the Construction of a New Development Pattern; Implementation Plan for Deepening Rural Reform; Opinions on Promoting the Gradual Shift from Dual Control of Energy Consumption to Dual Control of Carbon Emissions; Opinions on Pilot Reform of Salary Systems in Institutions of Higher Learning and Research Institutions; "Implementation Opinions on Further Deepening the Reform of the Oil and Gas Market System and Improving the National Oil and Gas Security Capabilities"; Guiding Opinions on Deepening Power System Reform and Accelerating the Construction of a New Power System	
3	7 November 2023	The meeting approved: Opinions on Comprehensively Promoting the Construction of a Beautiful China; Opinions on Further Improving the State-owned Capital Operation Budget System; "Implementation Opinions on Improving the Regulatory System and Mechanism for Natural Monopolies"; Guiding Opinions on Strengthening Supervision and Management of Expert Participation in Public Decision-making; Guiding Opinions on Strengthening Ecological and Environmental Zoning Control	
4	19 February 2024	The meeting approved: Opinions on Reforming the Land Management System to Enhance the Ability to Guarantee High-Quality Development in Advantageous Regions; Opinions on Promoting Comprehensive Green Transformation of Economic and Social Development; Opinions on Further Improving Grassroots Emergency Management Capabilities; "Opinions on Accelerating the Formation of Basic Systems to Support Comprehensive Innovation"; "2023 Work Summary Report of the Central Committee for Comprehensively Deepening Reforms"; "Key Points of the Central Committee for Comprehensively Deepening Reform in 2024"	
5	11 June 2024	The meeting approved: Opinions on Improving the Modern Enterprise System with Chinese Characteristics; Guiding Opinions on Improving the Income Guarantee Mechanism for Grain-Growing Farmers and the Interest Compensation Mechanism for Major Grain-Producing Areas; Several Opinions on Building an Open Environment for Scientific and Technological Innovation with Global Competitiveness, etc.	
6	29 August 2024	The meeting approved: "Division of work plan for the implementation of important reform measures of the Decision of the Third Plenary Session of the 20th CCP Central Committee by relevant departments of the Central Committee and state organs"; Opinions on Implementing the Free Trade Pilot Zone Enhancement Strategy	
