= Third plenary session of the 18th Central Committee of the Chinese Communist Party =

Event held in Beijing

Third plenary session of the 18th Central Committee of the Chinese Communist Party 中国共产党第十八届中央委员会第三次全体会议
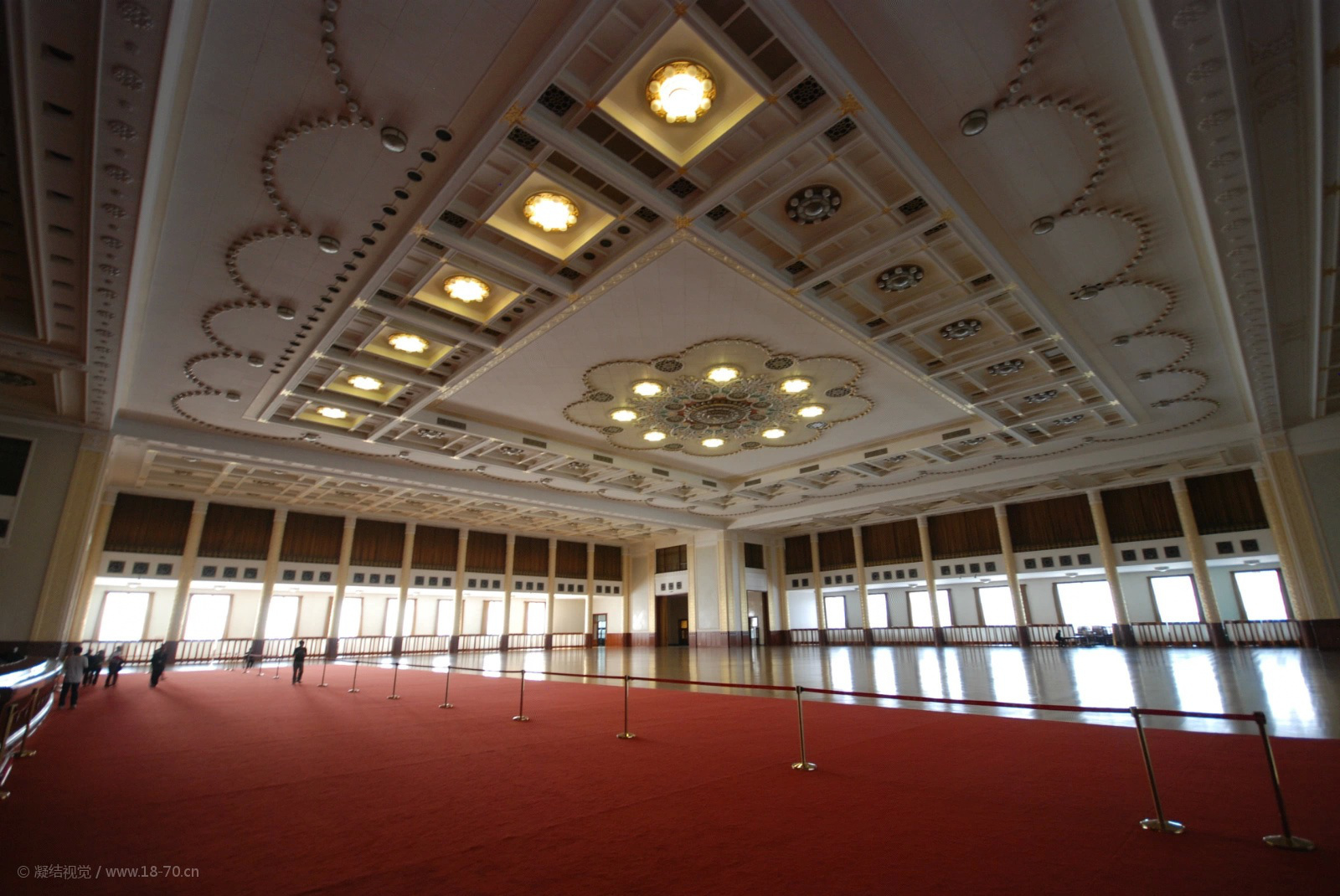
- Panoramic view of the Banquet Hall in the Great Hall of the People
- Date: November 9–12, 2013
- Locations: Banquet Hall, Great Hall of the People, Beijing, China
- Previous event: Fourth plenary session of the 18th Central Committee
- Next event: Second plenary session of the 18th Central Committee
- Participants: 204 Central Committee members 169 Central Committee alternate members
- General Secretary: Xi Jinping

Third plenary session of the 18th Central Committee of the Chinese Communist Party
- Simplified Chinese: 中国共产党第十八届中央委员会第三次全体会议
- Traditional Chinese: 中國共產黨第十八屆中央委員會第三次全體會議
Transcriptions
Standard Mandarin
- Hanyu Pinyin: Zhōngguó Gòngchǎndǎng Dìshíbā Jiè Zhōngyāng Wěiyuánhuì Dìāncì Quántǐ Huìyì

Abbreviation
- Simplified Chinese: 中共十八届三中全会
- Traditional Chinese: 中共十八屆三中全會
Transcriptions
Standard Mandarin
- Hanyu Pinyin: Zhōnggòng Shíbājiè Sānzhōng Quánhuì

The third plenary session of the 18th Central Committee of the Chinese Communist Party was convened from November 9 to 12, 2013. A total of 204 CCP Central Committee members and 169 alternate members attended the meeting. The Politburo reported its work to the Central Committee at the meeting. The meeting also discussed some issues concerning comprehensively deepening reform. The meeting adopted the Decision on Several Major Issues Concerning Comprehensively Deepening Reform and decided to establish a Central Leading Group for Comprehensively Deepening Reforms.

== Preparation ==
The 18th CCP National Congress held in November 2012 proposed the goal of building a moderately prosperous society in all respects and deepening reform and opening up in all respects, namely, "sustained and healthy economic development, continuous expansion of people's democracy, significant enhancement of cultural soft power, overall improvement of people's living standards, and major progress in building a resource-saving and environmentally friendly society"; in addition, it proposed the " two centenary " goals, namely, " building a moderately prosperous society in all respects by the 100th anniversary of the Chinese Communist Party, and building a prosperous, strong, democratic, civilized and harmonious modern socialist country by the centenary of the founding of the People's Republic of China." In order to achieve these goals, the Politburo held a meeting on August 27 of the following year and decided to hold the Third Plenary Session of the 18th CCP Central Committee to make arrangements for deepening reform in all respects. The Third Plenary Session of the CCP Central Committee is generally considered to be the meeting that decides on long-term economic development and reform plans.

== Meeting ==
The Decision on Several Major Issues Concerning Comprehensively Deepening Reform adopted at the meeting made reform arrangements in six areas: economy, politics, culture, society, ecological civilization, national defense, and the military. Among them, economic system reform is the focus of comprehensively deepening reforms. In addition, the "Decision" also specifically pointed out the leadership of the CCP in comprehensively deepening reforms and required that "the proposed reform tasks be completed by 2020." The long-term goals of the reform plan also became part of the 13th Five-Year Plan (2016–2020).

=== Economic reform ===
==== Relationship between the market and state ====
The 14th CCP National Congress held in 1992 proposed that the market plays a fundamental role in resource allocation under the macroeconomic control of the state, while the Third Plenary Session of the 18th CCP Central Committee revised this position and proposed for the first time that the market plays a decisive role in resource allocation. Therefore, efforts should be made to solve the problems of imperfect market system, excessive government intervention and inadequate supervision.

==== Basic economic system ====
The 18th CCP National Congress held in 2012 proposed the requirement of "ensuring that all types of economic ownership have equal access to production factors, fair participation in market competition, and equal protection under the law." In response to this requirement, the Third Plenary Session of the 18th CCP Central Committee proposed to improve the property rights protection system and ensure that the property rights of both public and non-public economic entities are inviolable, and put it at the top of the economic system reform tasks.

The Third Plenary Session of the 18th CCP Central Committee proposed to actively develop a mixed-ownership economy and put forward the "three permissions", namely, to allow more state-owned and other ownership economies to develop into mixed-ownership economies, to allow non-state-owned capital to participate in state-owned capital investment projects, and to allow mixed-ownership economies to implement employee shareholding, thus forming a community of interests between capital owners and workers. Lian Weiliang, deputy director of the National Development and Reform Commission, said: "In the past, we talked about the common development of various ownerships, and emphasized the self-development of different ownership economies, emphasizing that they are not mutually exclusive and promote each other. Now, when talking about mixed-ownership economies, we emphasize the direct combination, cross-holding, and integrated development between different ownership forms."

The Third Plenary Session of the 14th CCP Central Committee held in 1993 proposed that state-owned enterprises should establish a modern enterprise system that adapts to the requirements of the market economy, with clear property rights, clear rights and responsibilities, separation of government and enterprises, and scientific management. The Third Plenary Session of the 18th CCP Central Committee proposed to further deepen the reform of state-owned enterprises to adapt to the new situation of marketization and internationalization, and proposed that natural monopoly industries that continue to be controlled by state capital should implement reforms with the separation of government and enterprises, separation of government and capital, franchise, and government supervision as the main contents.

The Third Plenary Session of the 18th CCP Central Committee proposed to support the healthy development of the non-public economy, saying that the non-public economy plays an important role in supporting growth, promoting innovation, expanding employment, and increasing tax revenue. It is necessary to uphold equal rights, equal opportunities, and equal rules. It proposed to abolish unreasonable regulations on the non-public economy, eliminate various hidden barriers, and formulate specific measures for non-public enterprises to enter the franchise field. It also proposed "three encouragements", namely, encouraging non-public enterprises to participate in the reform of state-owned enterprises, encouraging the development of mixed-ownership enterprises controlled by non-public capital, and encouraging qualified private enterprises to establish a modern enterprise system.

==== Modern market system ====
The Third Plenary Session of the 18th CCP Central Committee proposed the establishment of fair, open and transparent market rules, and stated that building a unified, open, competitive and orderly market system is the basis for the market to play a decisive role in resource allocation. Therefore, it was proposed to implement a unified market access system and explore a negative list management model. In addition, the market supervision system should be reformed to oppose local protectionism, monopoly and unfair competition.

The Third Plenary Session of the 18th CCP Central Committee proposed to improve the mechanism in which prices are mainly determined by the market. This move was called "the key to reform" by scholar Hu Angang. Xie Lianping, director of the Hubei Provincial Price Bureau, said: "Price is the core of the market mechanism, and price monopoly behavior is the most direct and serious damage to the market mechanism. The price department should further emancipate the mind, streamline administration and delegate power on the basis of properly handling the relationship between the government and the market, and strengthen and improve the comprehensive regulation of market prices."

The Third Plenary Session of the 18th CCP Central Committee proposed to establish a unified urban and rural construction land market, allowing rural collective business construction land to be sold, leased, and invested in, and to be put on the market on an equal footing with state-owned land, with the same rights and prices; to improve the financial market system, not only to allow private capital to establish small and medium-sized banks and other financial institutions, but also to improve the multi-level capital market system, improve the insurance economic compensation mechanism, improve the market-oriented formation mechanism of the RMB exchange rate, and improve the regulatory coordination mechanism; to deepen the reform of the science and technology system, not only to establish and improve the system and mechanism to encourage innovation, but also to improve the market-oriented mechanism for technological innovation, and at the same time pay attention to the protection of intellectual property rights. In addition, it was proposed that all major national scientific research infrastructure that should be open to the public in accordance with regulations should be open to the public, and to implement a retirement and withdrawal system for academicians.

==== Transformation of government functions ====
The Third Plenary Session of the 18th CCP Central Committee decided to transform government functions and build a law-based and service-oriented government. It decided that first, China must improve the macro-control system, requiring it to be guided by national development strategies and plans and to use fiscal and monetary policies as the main means; second, China must fully and correctly perform government functions, streamline administration and delegate power, cancel approval procedures, and allow market mechanisms to effectively regulate economic activities; third, China must optimize the government organizational structure and strictly control the size of institutions.

==== Fiscal system reform ====
The Third Plenary Session of the 18th CCP Central Committee proposed to establish a modern fiscal system, improve legislation, clarify responsibilities, reform the tax system, stabilize the tax burden, make budgets transparent, and improve efficiency. It is necessary to improve the budget management system, improve the tax system, and establish a system that matches responsibilities and expenditure responsibilities.

==== Integration of urban and rural development ====
The Third Plenary Session of the 18th CCP Central Committee proposed to form a relationship between industry, agriculture, urban and rural areas, in which industry promotes agriculture, urban areas promote rural development, industry and agriculture are mutually beneficial, and urban and rural areas are integrated. Therefore, it is necessary to accelerate the construction of a new agricultural management system, give farmers more property rights, promote equal exchange of urban and rural factors and balanced allocation of public resources, and improve the system and mechanism for the healthy development of urbanization.

==== Open economic system ====
The Third Plenary Session of the 18th CCP Central Committee decided to relax investment access, that is, to further relax restrictions on foreign investment access; at the same time, to accelerate the construction of free trade zones, hoping to form a high-standard free trade zone network facing the world; and to expand the opening up of inland and border areas to form a new pattern of all-round opening up.

=== Political reform ===
==== Democratic political system ====
The Third Plenary Session of the 18th CCP Central Committee proposed to promote the people's congress system to keep pace with the times and improve its working mechanism. At the same time, it is necessary to promote the extensive and multi-level institutional development of consultative democracy and develop grassroots democracy.

==== Rule of law construction ====
The Third Plenary Session of the 18th CCP Central Committee proposed to build a rule of law China, and declared that the people should feel fairness and justice in every judicial case. Specifically:

- We must uphold the authority of the Constitution and laws, insist that everyone is equal before the law, and resolutely investigate all acts that violate the Constitution and laws;
- We must deepen the reform of the administrative law enforcement system, rationalize the urban management law enforcement system, improve administrative law enforcement procedures, standardize law enforcement discretion, and strengthen supervision over administrative law enforcement;
- We must ensure that the judicial and procuratorial powers are exercised independently and impartially in accordance with the law, that is, reform the judicial management system, and at the same time explore the establishment of a judicial jurisdiction system that is appropriately separated from administrative divisions to ensure the unified and correct implementation of national laws;
- We must improve the judicial power operation mechanism, reform the trial committee system, and promote open trials and public prosecutions;
- We must improve the judicial protection system for human rights, strictly prohibit torture and corporal punishment, strictly implement the rules for excluding illegal evidence, gradually reduce the number of crimes punishable by death, abolish the labor education system, and improve the legal aid system.

==== Power operation restriction and supervision system ====
The Third Plenary Session of the 18th CCP Central Committee proposed that China should persist in using systems to manage power, affairs and people, let the people supervise power, let power operate in the sunshine, control the expenditure of "three public expenses" and the construction of buildings and facilities, and focus on solving problems such as "image projects", "political achievement projects", inaction and arbitrary actions.

=== Cultural system reform ===
The Third Plenary Session of the 18th CCP Central Committee proposed that in terms of the cultural management system, China should promote the transformation of government departments from managing culture to governing culture, and improve the system and mechanism for upholding the correct public opinion orientation; in terms of the cultural market system, China should improve the cultural market entry and exit mechanism, encourage all kinds of market players to compete fairly and the survival of the fittest; in terms of the public cultural service system, China should promote the standardization and equalization of basic public cultural services and introduce a competition mechanism; in addition, China should improve the level of cultural openness and actively absorb and learn from all excellent cultural achievements from abroad.

The Economist found that the Decision implicitly mentioned allowing social groups to develop, indicating the new government's attitude towards the development of non-governmental organizations in China.

=== Social system reform ===
The Third Plenary Session of the 18th CCP Central Committee proposed to deepen comprehensive reforms in the field of education. First, China must fully implement the Party's educational policy and strengthen education on the socialist core value system; second, China must strengthen physical education and extracurricular exercise and improve aesthetic education; third, China must promote educational equity and gradually narrow the gap between regions, urban and rural areas, and schools, and prohibit the establishment of key schools and key classes; fourth, China must accelerate the construction of a modern vocational education system.

In particular, the Third Plenary Session of the 18th CCP Central Committee proposed to promote the reform of the examination and enrollment system, hoping to fundamentally solve the drawbacks of one test determining one's life. Compulsory education should be free of examination and admission should be based on the nearest school. The school district system and the nine-year continuous enrollment system should be piloted. Junior and senior high schools should implement academic proficiency tests and comprehensive quality evaluation. Vocational schools should implement classified enrollment or registration for admission. Regular colleges and universities should implement a diversified admission mechanism based on comprehensive evaluation of the unified college entrance examination and high school academic proficiency test scores. In addition, China should explore reducing the number of subjects in the national unified examination, and conducting socialized examinations more than once a year without distinguishing between liberal arts, science, foreign languages, etc. China should pilot the conversion of credits between regular colleges and universities, higher vocational colleges, and adult colleges to broaden the channels for lifelong learning.

In addition, China need to improve the institutional mechanisms to promote employment and entrepreneurship, form a reasonable and orderly income distribution pattern, establish a more equitable and sustainable social security system, deepen the reform of the medical and health system, and implement the "two- child policy for couples with only one child ".

As for social governance, China need to strengthen the leadership of the Party committee, give full play to the leading role of the government, encourage and support participation from all sectors of society, stimulate the vitality of social organizations, reform the administrative review and petition system, and improve the public security system.

==== National Security Commission ====
The Third Plenary Session of the 18th CCP Central Committee decided to establish the Central National Security Commission. On January 24 of the following year, the Politburo decided that the Central National Security Commission would be chaired by General Secretary Xi Jinping and vice chaired by Politburo Standing Committee members Li Keqiang and Zhang Dejiang. The commission is a decision-making and deliberative coordination body of the CCP Central Committee on national security work, responsible for coordinating major issues and important work related to national security. The Chinese Ministry of Foreign Affairs stated that the establishment of the National Security Commission would make "terrorists, separatists, and extremists" nervous. Ta Kung Pao and Xinhua News Agency supported its establishment, believing that it was "just in time." A report by the Defense Research Institute of the Japanese Ministry of Defense speculated that the purpose of establishing the National Security Commission was to "formulate a national security strategy and institutionalize unified leadership and policy coordination." It would oversee the formulation of diplomatic and national security policies. It was established to achieve policy coordination so that the Chinese government could respond quickly to domestic and foreign security threats.

=== Ecological civilization system reform ===
The Third Plenary Session of the 18th CCP Central Committee proposed to protect the ecological environment through systems, namely, to implement "the strictest source protection system, damage compensation system, and accountability system, and to improve the environmental governance and ecological restoration system". Therefore, it is necessary to improve the natural resource asset property rights system and use control system, improve the national natural resource asset management system; draw ecological protection red lines, explore the compilation of natural resource asset balance sheets; implement a resource use compensation system and an ecological compensation system; and reform the ecological environment protection management system.

=== National defense and military system reform ===
The Third Plenary Session of the 18th CCP Central Committee proposed the CCP's goal of strengthening the military under the new situation: "Building a people's army that obeys the Party's command, can win battles, and has a good style of work." In order to achieve this goal, the CCP proposed "deepening the reform of the military system and organization, optimizing the size and structure of the military; promoting the adjustment and reform of military policies and systems, improving the military expenditure management system, and improving the military laws and regulations system; promoting the in-depth development of military-civilian integration."

=== Central Leading Group for Comprehensively Deepening Reform ===
The Third Plenary Session of the 18th CCP Central Committee decided to establish a Central Leading Group for Comprehensively Deepening Reforms. One month later, the Politburo of the CCP Central Committee decided to formally establish the group, with General Secretary Xi Jinping as the group leader and Politburo Standing Committee members Li Keqiang, Liu Yunshan and Zhang Gaoli as deputy group leaders. The group began operations on January 22, 2014, with six special groups under it: "Economic System and Ecological Civilization System Reform," "Democracy and Legal System Reform," "Cultural System Reform," "Social System Reform," "Party Building System Reform," and "Disciplinary Inspection System Reform."

== Analysis ==
Meng Xiaosu, a Chinese economist and executive vice president of the China Enterprise Confederation, said in an interview with Deutsche Welle that Li, who has “removed the chains”, will step up reform efforts and bring China's reform and development in line with the world. However, Deutsche Welle's overall assessment of the meeting was that it promoted economic reform, but was more conservative in politics and ideology. The “Decision” mentioned promoting the appropriate separation of the judiciary and the administration. Some Chinese legal scholars are not optimistic about the reform of judicial independence, because according to the current principle of judicial localization, it is difficult for courts and procuratorates not to be controlled by local party and government agencies. However, there are rumors that local courts and procuratorates below the provincial level will promote the unification of personnel, finances and materials, which indicates that vertical management of the judicial system will gradually be realized. BBC News published an article that Xi Jinping centralized power through the National Security Commission, and the National Security Commission will consolidate Xi Jinping's ruling position.
