= Moderately prosperous society =

Chinese term for a middle-class society

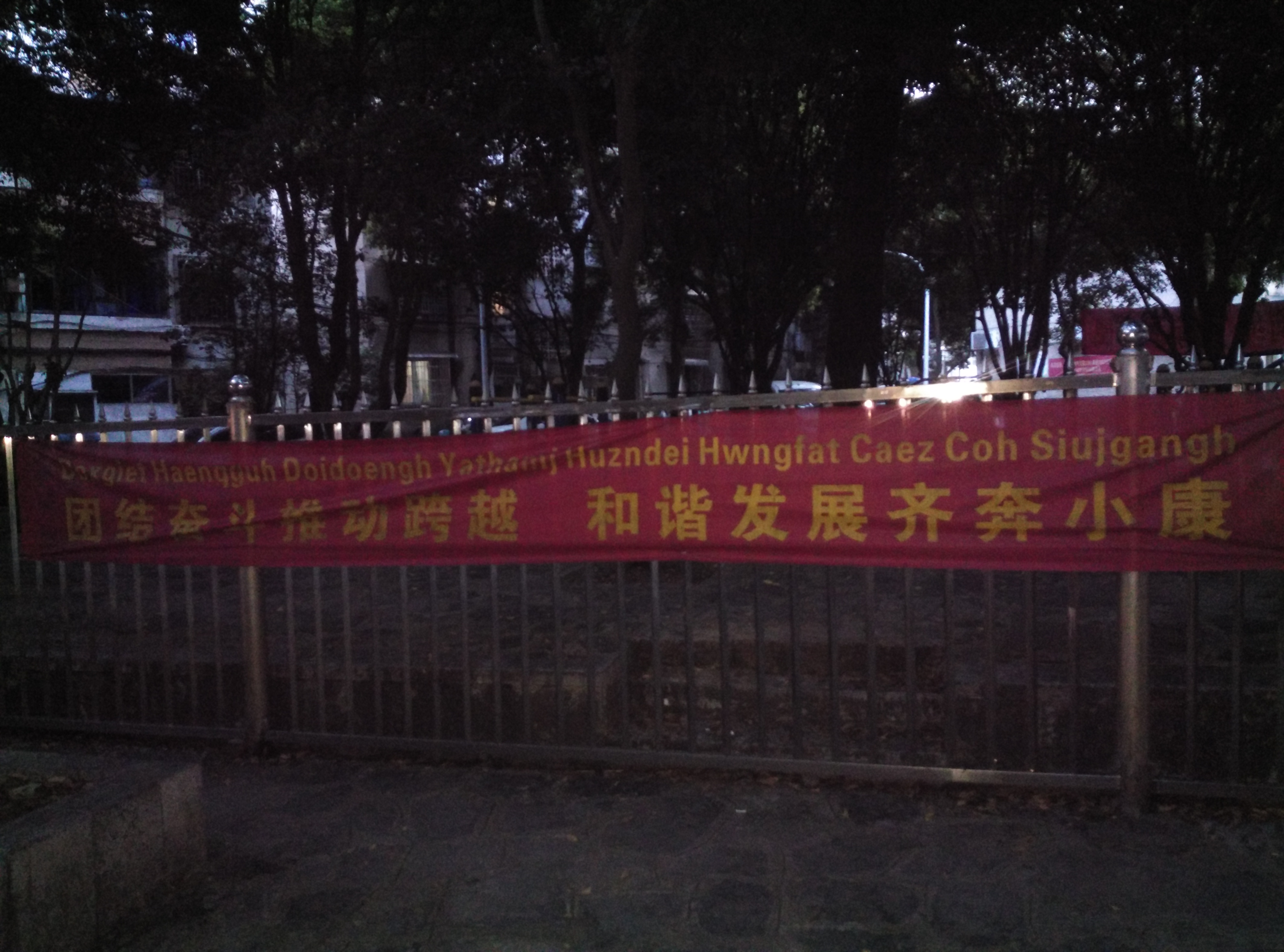
Propaganda banner in the Zhuang language in Qixing District mentioning "harmonious development towards Xiaokang".

Moderately prosperous society, or Xiaokang society (Chinese: 小康社会; pinyin: Xiǎokāng Shèhuì), is a Chinese term, originally of Confucianism, used to describe a society composed of a functional middle-class. In December 1979, Deng Xiaoping, then paramount leader of China, first proposed the idea of "Xiaokang" based on the "Four Modernizations". Jiang Zemin, General Secretary of the Chinese Communist Party between 1989 and 2002, expanded the concept to include more goals, and coined the term "comprehensively building a moderately prosperous society", which would be completed by 2020. CCP General Secretary Hu Jintao referred to economic policies intended to realize a more equal distribution of wealth. In the usages (Tifa) of current General Secretary Xi Jinping, the term Chinese Dream has gained somewhat greater prominence. In 2015, Xi unveiled a set of political slogans called the Four Comprehensives, which include "Comprehensively build a moderately prosperous society." At the 100th anniversary of the Chinese Communist Party on 1 July 2021, Xi Jinping declared that China achieved its goal of building a moderately prosperous society.

== History ==
Now that the Great Way has fallen into obscurity, the world is held as private possession. Each cherishes only his own kin, each nurtures only his own children. Wealth and strength are pursued for oneself; high offices are transmitted hereditarily and taken as propriety. Cities and moats are built for defense; ritual and righteousness are employed as norms. Thus ruler and minister are made correct, father and son are bound with devotion, brothers are harmonized, husband and wife are brought into accord. Institutions are established, fields and boundaries are fixed, worth is assigned to the able and the courageous, and merit is claimed for oneself. Hence stratagems arise, and from these the use of arms is born.

Yu, Tang, King Wen, King Wu, King Cheng, and the Duke of Zhou were chosen according to this order. Of these six exemplary men, none failed to be reverent in ritual. Through ritual they made righteousness manifest and tested trustworthiness; faults were recorded, punishments and benevolence applied, deference and yielding taught, so that the people were shown what was constant. Those who did not follow this way were recalled from office, and the multitude regarded them as calamities. This is what is called the "moderately prosperous society". — Confucius, Book of Rites (Liji), "Liyun"

It has been loosely translated as a "basically well-off" society in which the people are able to live relatively comfortably, albeit ordinarily. The term was first used in Classic of Poetry written as early as 3,000 years ago. Xiaokang also appears in the Book of Rites. In it, Confucius writes of a Great Unity society, where "the world was shared by all alike. The worthy and the able were promoted to office and men practiced good faith and lived in affection. Therefore they did not regard as parents only their own parents, or as sons only their own sons". He compared this with xiaokang societies, which the rules of the times, though well-ordered, governed by ritual, and relatively prosperous, did not attain the same amount of harmony and moral excellence as the past.

Deng Xiaoping described a xiaokang society as a goal of the Four Modernizations. In a 1979 discussion with Japanese Prime Minister Masayoshi Ōhira, Deng used the concept to distinguish China's path of development from other approaches, stating, "The Four Modernizations we hope to realize are a Chinese Four Modernizations. Our conceptualization of the Four Modernizations is not like your conception of modernization, but it is a xiaokang family." He said "Even if we reach [moderate prosperity], we will still be a backward nation compared to Western countries. However, at that point China will be a country with comparative prosperity and our people will enjoy a much higher standard of living than they do now". Deng set the following goals for achieving a moderately prosperous society:

- by 1990, attaining a per capita income of US$500, reaching the development level just below that of moderately well-off;
- by 2000, attaining a per capita income of US$800 to $1,000, reaching a moderately well-off level of development;
- by 2050, attaining a per capita income of US$4,000, marking China's growth from the moderately well-off threshold to become a "middle-income country".

The revival of the concept of a Xiaokang society was in part a criticism of social trends in mainland China in the 1990s under Jiang Zemin, in which many in China felt was focusing too much on the newly rich and not enough on mainland China's rural poor. In 1997, Jiang expanded the concept to include more goals, including GDP growth, expanded rural development, increased living standards, the implementation of a social security system, the strengthening of governing institutions and education, poverty alleviation, and environmental protection. He also coined the term "comprehensively building a moderately prosperous society". At the 16th National Congress of the Chinese Communist Party in 2002, Jiang, set a goal of achieving comprehensive xiaokang by 2020. He warned that "The moderately prosperous life we are leading is still at a low level, it is not all-inclusive and is very uneven". Hu Jintao reiterated this goal at the 17th Party Congress and the 18th Party Congress. He also set a goal of doubling China's GDP and GDP per capita by 2020. In 2015, Xi announced the Four Comprehensives, which included comprehensively building a moderately prosperous society. That year, Xi further introduced three new requirements for building a moderately prosperous society, namely:

1. no rural resident to live below the rural poverty line of ¥4,000;
2. the growth rate of the per capita disposable income of residents of poor rural areas to exceed that of the national average; and
3. the main basic public services in poor rural areas come close to the national average.

Accordingly, Xi launched the battle against poverty campaign in October 2015. Xi said that "it is a solemn promise made by our party to ensure that poor people and poor areas will enter a moderately prosperous society together with the rest of the country". At the 100th anniversary of the Chinese Communist Party on 1 July 2021, Xi Jinping declared that China achieved its goal of building a moderately prosperous society in all respects.

== Modern political discourse ==
The vision of a Xiaokang society is one in which most people are moderately well off and middle class, and in which economic prosperity is sufficient to move most of the population in mainland China into comfortable means, but in which economic advancement is not the sole focus of society. Explicitly incorporated into the concept of a Xiaokang society is the idea that economic growth needs to be balanced with sometimes conflicting goals of social equality and environmental protection. Xiaokang is also a name for a semi-monthly magazine that is affiliated to the Qiushi Magazine, the party-run magazine in Beijing. Started in 2004, it mainly focuses on the political and economic development in China.

=== Tibet ===
Chinese state media has used the term "Xiaokang villages" to describe structures built by the People's Liberation Army near the Line of Actual Control in its ongoing border dispute with India.

== See also ==
- Buddhist economics
- Harmonious Society
- Real socialism
- Sufficiency economy
