= Li Jun (politician) =

Chinese politician

Li Jun (Chinese: 李军; born February 1962) is the Chinese Communist Party Deputy Committee Secretary of Hainan. He took on the position in December 2014. Prior to that, he was deputy party chief of Guizhou.

Li was born in Anxiang County, Hunan province. Li is a graduate of Wuhan University, with a bachelor's degree in Chinese language. In 1985 he joined the Ministry of Culture. In 1990, he joined the General Office of the Chinese Communist Party, conducting research. In July 2003, he became assistant governor of Guizhou. In December 2004, he was named a member of the Chinese Communist Party Provincial Standing Committee of Guizhou and head of provincial propaganda. In April 2007 he was named party chief of Guiyang. In April 2013, he was named deputy party chief of Guizhou province. He was transferred laterally to Hainan in 2014.
