= 100th Anniversary of the Chinese Communist Party =

Centennial of the Chinese Communist Party (CCP)

- Part of the Two Centenaries
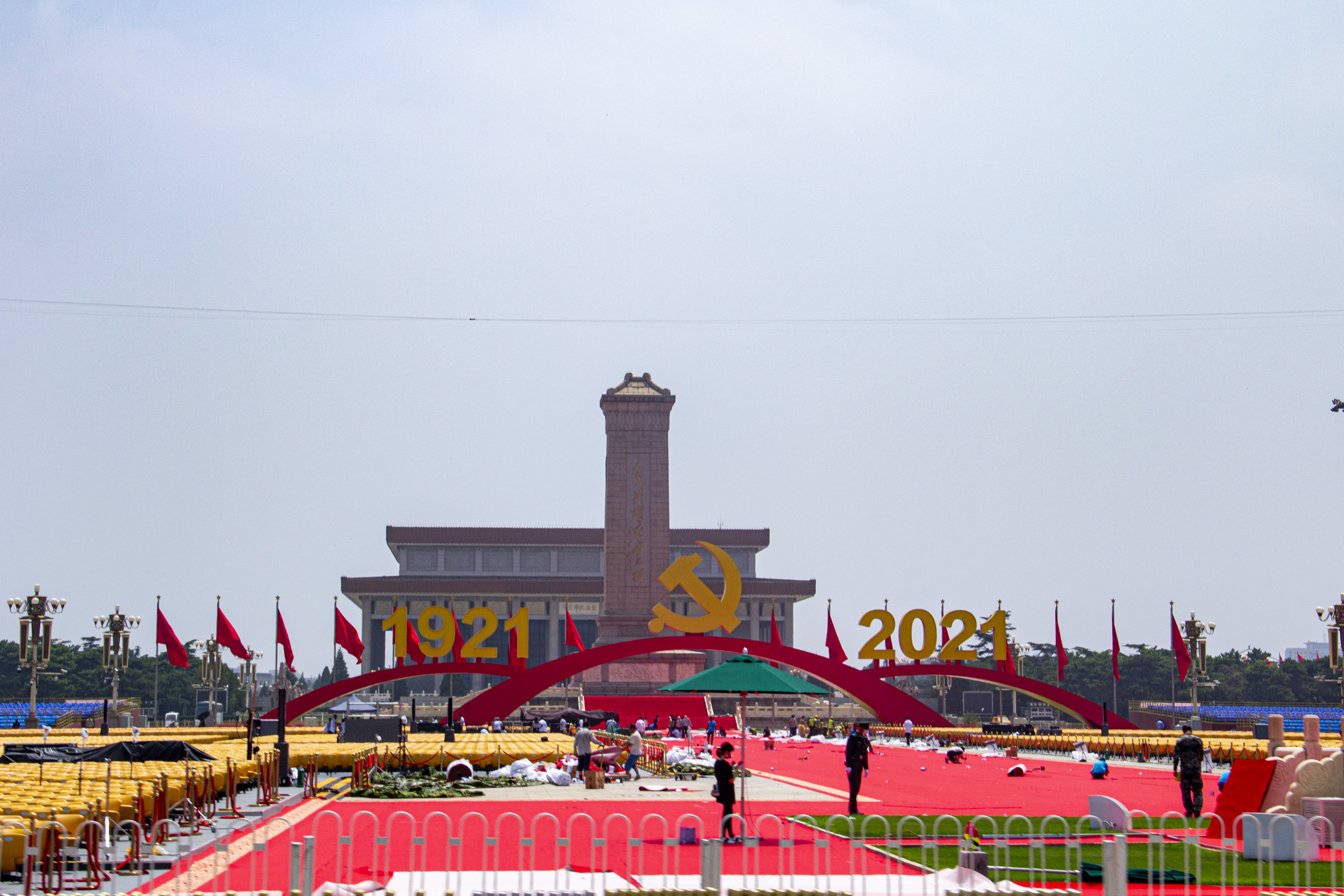
- The scenery of decorations at Tiananmen Square on 30 June 2021
- Native name: 中国共产党成立100周年庆祝活动
- Date: 1 July 2021
- Location: Chang'an Avenue, Tiananmen Square, Beijing, China; 39°54′26.4″N 116°23′27.9″E
- Also known as: Centennial of the Chinese Communist Party; Centenary of the Chinese Communist Party; 中国共产党成立一百周年
- Type: Mass pageant, music and dance gala
- Motive: Commemoration of the centennial of the founding of the Chinese Communist Party in July 1921
- Organised by: Chinese Communist Party; • Xi Jinping (General Secretary); • Li Keqiang (Premier and host); • Yi Xiaoguang
- Participants: Chinese Communist Party, Government of China, National leaders, international organization leaders, PLA, PAP, Militia, and other formations
- Website: Official event page (English)

100th Anniversary of the Chinese Communist Party
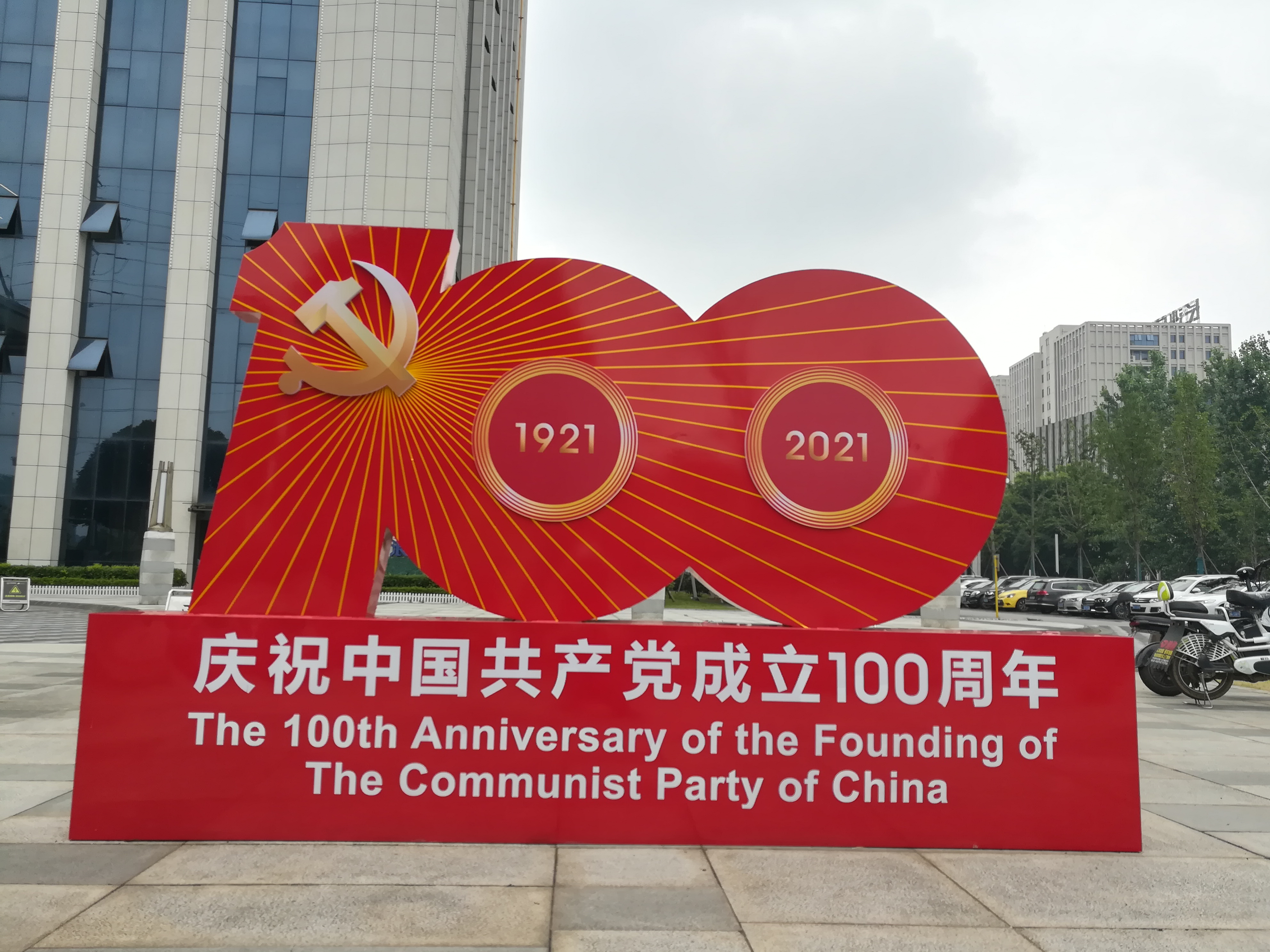
- Slogan for the 100th anniversary of the founding of the Communist Party of China
- Simplified Chinese: 中国共产党成立100周年庆祝活动
- Traditional Chinese: 中國共產黨成立100週年慶祝活動
Transcriptions
Standard Mandarin
- Hanyu Pinyin: Zhōngguó gòngchǎndǎng chénglì 100 zhōunián qìngzhù huódòng
- Wade–Giles: Chung-kuo kung-ch'an-tang chʻêng-li 100 chou-nien ch’ing-chou huo-tung

Centennial of the Chinese Communist Party
- Simplified Chinese: 中国共产党成立一百周年
- Traditional Chinese: 中國共產黨成立一百週年
Transcriptions
Standard Mandarin
- Hanyu Pinyin: Zhōngguó Gòngchǎndǎng Chénglì Yībǎi Zhōunián
- Wade–Giles: Chung-kuo kung-ch'an-tang chʻêng-li yi-pai chou-nien

Celebrations of the 100th anniversary of the founding of the Chinese Communist Party were held on 1 July 2021 in Beijing to celebrate the centennial of the founding of the Chinese Communist Party (CCP), which has been the sole governing political party of the People's Republic of China (PRC) since 1949.

CCP general secretary Xi Jinping, as the guest of honor, delivered a speech and presented the Order of July the First order of honor to CCP members who have made significant contributions. Premier Li Keqiang served as the official host of the event. Similar celebrations were scheduled nationwide in mainland China, the Macau Special Administrative Region, and the Hong Kong Special Administrative Region, coinciding with the 24th anniversary of the handover from the United Kingdom on the same day.

== Background ==
The CCP was founded in 1921 by Chen Duxiu and Li Dazhao, with the help of the Far Eastern Bureau of the Communist International. From 1927 to 1950, the CCP fought a civil war against the Kuomintang-led government but it temporarily ceased its hostilities to form a united front with the Kuomintang during the Second Sino-Japanese War to fight occupation by the Empire of Japan. In October 1949, Mao Zedong proclaimed the establishment of the People's Republic of China, and the Republic of China retreated to Taiwan. Since then, the CCP has been the sole ruling party in the country.

== Preparations ==
Leading up to the centenary celebrations, the Chinese government promoted Xi Jinping's outlook on history as the new orthodoxy. Academic Ji You writes, "A mass campaign was launched to study the CPC's history, focusing substantially on its long years of hard struggle to win national power." The highlighting of the CCP's centenary followed its general pattern of periodizing history. It is contrasted with the century of humiliation historiographical concept.

Internet censorship was increased. Museums across the country curated exhibitions related to history of the CCP. Adulatory messages such as "Listen to the party, appreciate the party, follow the party" adorned banners and billboards, foreign journalists were given tours to spread the official narrative. Buddhist temples held special anniversary events. The Cyberspace Administration of China (CAC) launched a hotline for netizens to report social media users who "distort" the party's history or attack its leadership.

There were physical restrictions placed as well. Several dissidents were sent on forced "vacations" away from Beijing for the weeks surrounding the anniversary. After mid-May, it was reported that many prominent Maoists were detained in Shandong. Radio Free Asia reported that the detentions were carried out in secret.

As part of the centenary, the CCP promoted "the spiritual genealogy of the Chinese communists." This included ninety-one different motivational examples, such as the "Spirit of the Jiangxi Soviet" and the "Spirit of Fighting COVID-19".

The China Film Administration (part of the CCP's Publicity Department) mandated local film authorities, film and cinema companies and production firms to screen and promote, starting 1 April, "outstanding films" – works "closely focused on the themes of loving the party, loving the nation and loving socialism", and "sing the praises of ... and eulogise the Party, the motherland, its people and its heroes". China Central Television (CCTV) produced a patriotic television series, called The Awakening Age, glorifying Chinese revolutionary history from 1915 to 1921; a collection of 100 rappers produced a 15-minute track praising the Party called "100%". One of the rappers took aim at the G7 countries accusing them of "antagonising" China. The rap song was criticised by both netizens and music industry insiders. The producer of the song expressed disappointment with the negative reception while critics referred to the rappers as "100 slaves." The song was also uploaded on the NetEase Cloud platform where majority of the 7000 originally posted comments were deleted.

The first full rehearsal for the festivities took place on 13 June 2021. Security was strengthened leading up to the celebrations, with an increase in the number of officers of the People's Armed Police and officers of the state security police in Beijing. The first press conference hosted by the Press Center took place on 27 June 2021.

=== Hong Kong ===
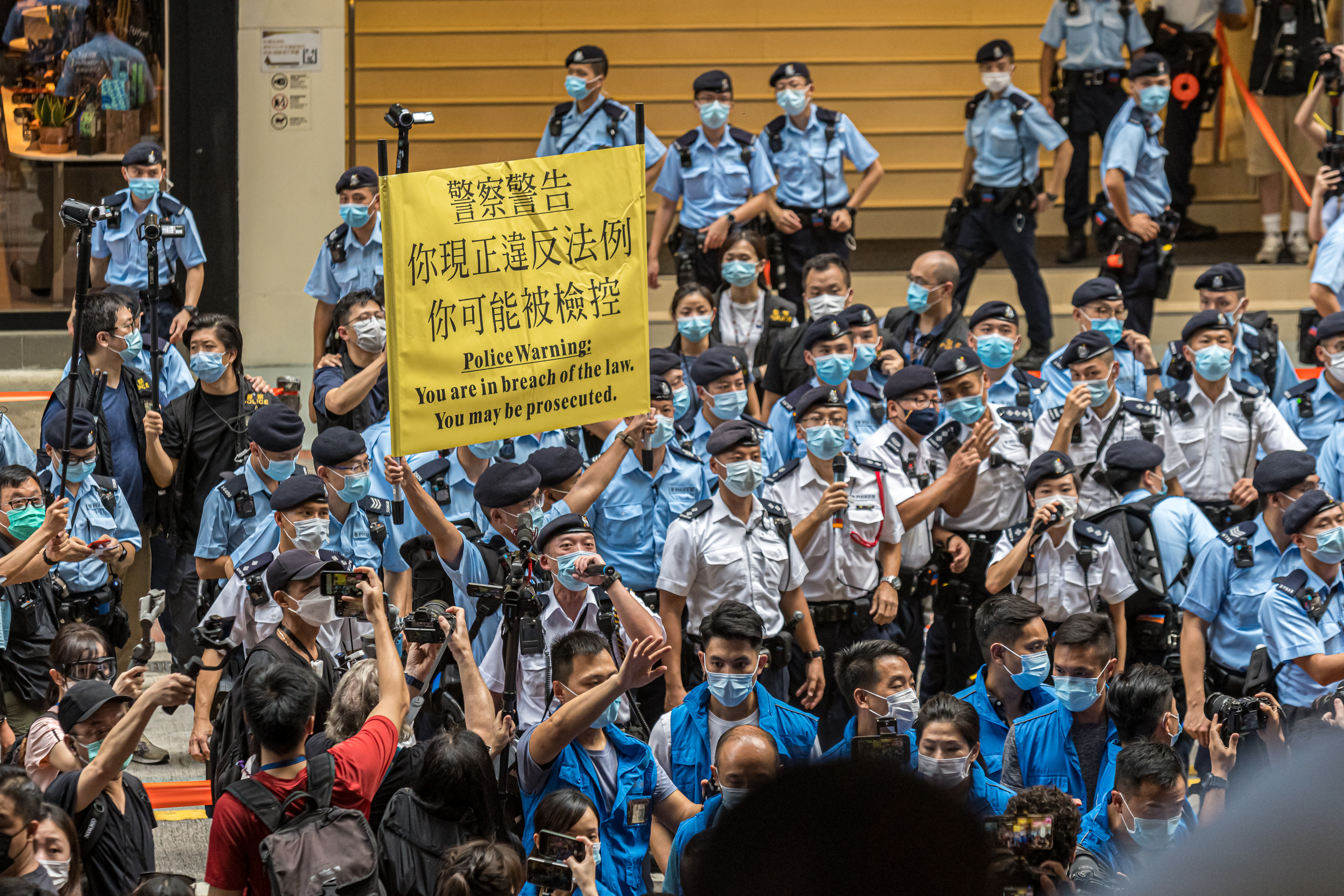
Heavy police presence in Causeway Bay, Hong Kong on 1 July 2021

Although the Civil Human Rights Front, traditional organizers of the annual march, announced that it was cancelling its plans, three other pro-democracy groups stepped in with an application to hold a demonstration, but the request was refused by police on the grounds of COVID-19 restrictions. Thousands of police were mobilized to prevent any possible protests, one day after the first anniversary of the implementation of the national security law in the territory. Victoria Park, the traditional starting point of the annual march, was declared off limits due to public order concerns, and all occupants were banished.

== Light shows and television extravaganza ==
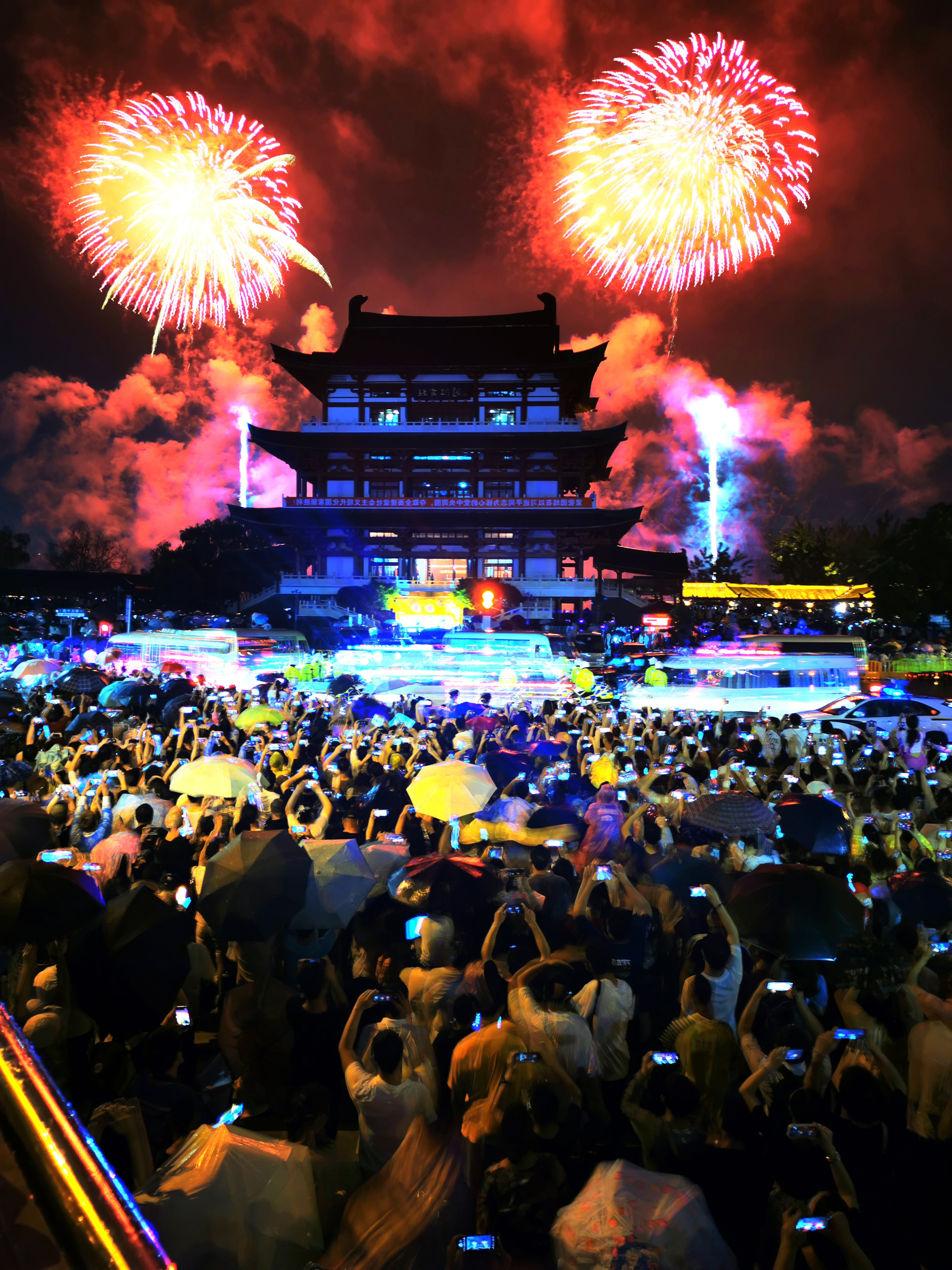
Fireworks set off in Changsha, Hunan, on 30 June 2021

Throughout June 2021, light shows took place in celebration of the anniversary in multiple Chinese cities including Beijing, Shanghai and Shenzhen.

An extravaganza produced by China Central Television was held at the Beijing National Stadium on 28 June 2021. It starred over 90 celebrities. The gala evening concluded with a huge fireworks display and a rendition of "Without the Communist Party, There Would be No New China".

== Tiananmen Square ceremony ==
A national ceremony and rally of 70,000 took place on Tiananmen Square in Beijing. It was attended by CCP general secretary Xi Jinping, former general secretary Hu Jintao, Chinese Premier Li Keqiang, former premier Wen Jiabao and members of the Politburo of the Chinese Communist Party. Hong Kong and Macau Chief Executives Carrie Lam and Ho Iat-seng were also in attendance. However, former CCP general secretary Jiang Zemin and former premier Zhu Rongji were absent.

The events began with a flag raising ceremony by the PLA Honour Guard after it marched off from the sides of the Monument to the People's Heroes, with a gun salute of 56 gunners (representing the 56 officially recognized ethnic groups of China) being fired 100 times (representing the 100 years of the party) in the background. The Flag of China was raised to the national anthem of the People's Republic of China, March of the Volunteers. The Communist Youth League of China and the Young Pioneers of China also read a message of congratulations.

=== Military flypast ===
In March 2021, General Li Jun, assistant to the director of the Political Work Department of the Central Military Commission, had said at a news conference that the expected military parade would not occur. The traditional military parade was replaced by a flypast of Chinese aircraft. Seventy-one People's Liberation Army Air Force fighters flew over Tiananmen Square, with helicopters and fighter jets forming the numbers "100" and "71".

=== Speech by Xi Jinping ===
Xi Jinping delivering a speech on 30 June 2021 at the 100th anniversary of the CCP's founding

Later, CCP general secretary Xi Jinping delivered an hour-long speech in which he specifically declared the realization of the first of the Two Centenaries' goals. In his speech, Xi coined the phrase "whole-process people's democracy" and tied the concept to "common prosperity."

While Xi stated that "any foreign force who attempted to bully China would find their heads broken and bashed bloody against the great wall of steel forged by the blood and flesh of 1.4 billion Chinese people", imagery drawn from the national anthem, March of the Volunteers. The official translation used the analogy "on a collision course with a great wall of steel". Xi praised the CCP, saying that there would be no new China without it, and it had "profoundly transformed the advancement of the Chinese nation ... [being] ... the foundation and lifeblood of the party and the country, and the crux upon which the interests and wellbeing of all Chinese people depend." Xi stated:

Any malicious attempt to separate the Chinese Communist Party from the Chinese people or to pit them against each other will never succeed! The Chinese communists of over 95 million will not agree! The Chinese population of over 1.4 billion will also not agree!

With respect to Taiwan and its political status, he stressed the need to "crush any Taiwan independence", reiterating the adherence to the one China principle and the 1992 Consensus, and the stated goal of completing unification, although the People's Republic of China has never ruled over the island. The spokesperson of Taiwan's Presidential Office, Kolas Yotaka, retorted that the CCP ought to "grow up" and "just pick another birthday gift for itself", while the Taiwanese Mainland Affairs Council called for a democratic transition in China on the CCP's 100th anniversary.

== Incidents ==
=== Hong Kong suicide attack ===
Amidst heavy police presence in Causeway Bay aimed at stopping demonstrations along the traditional march route in Hong Kong, a 50-year-old man stabbed a police officer in the back with a knife at 10 pm, and then turned the knife on himself. The police officer was rushed to hospital in a critical condition but survived, while the alleged assailant was declared dead upon arrival at the hospital. Hong Kong's newly appointed Security Secretary, Chris Tang, declared it a "terrorist act" committed by a "lone wolf", but blamed "many people who have encouraged violence and incited hatred toward society and the country". After mourners started laying flowers at the location where the suspect fell, police warned against mourning, amounting it to "supporting terrorism".

== Symbols ==
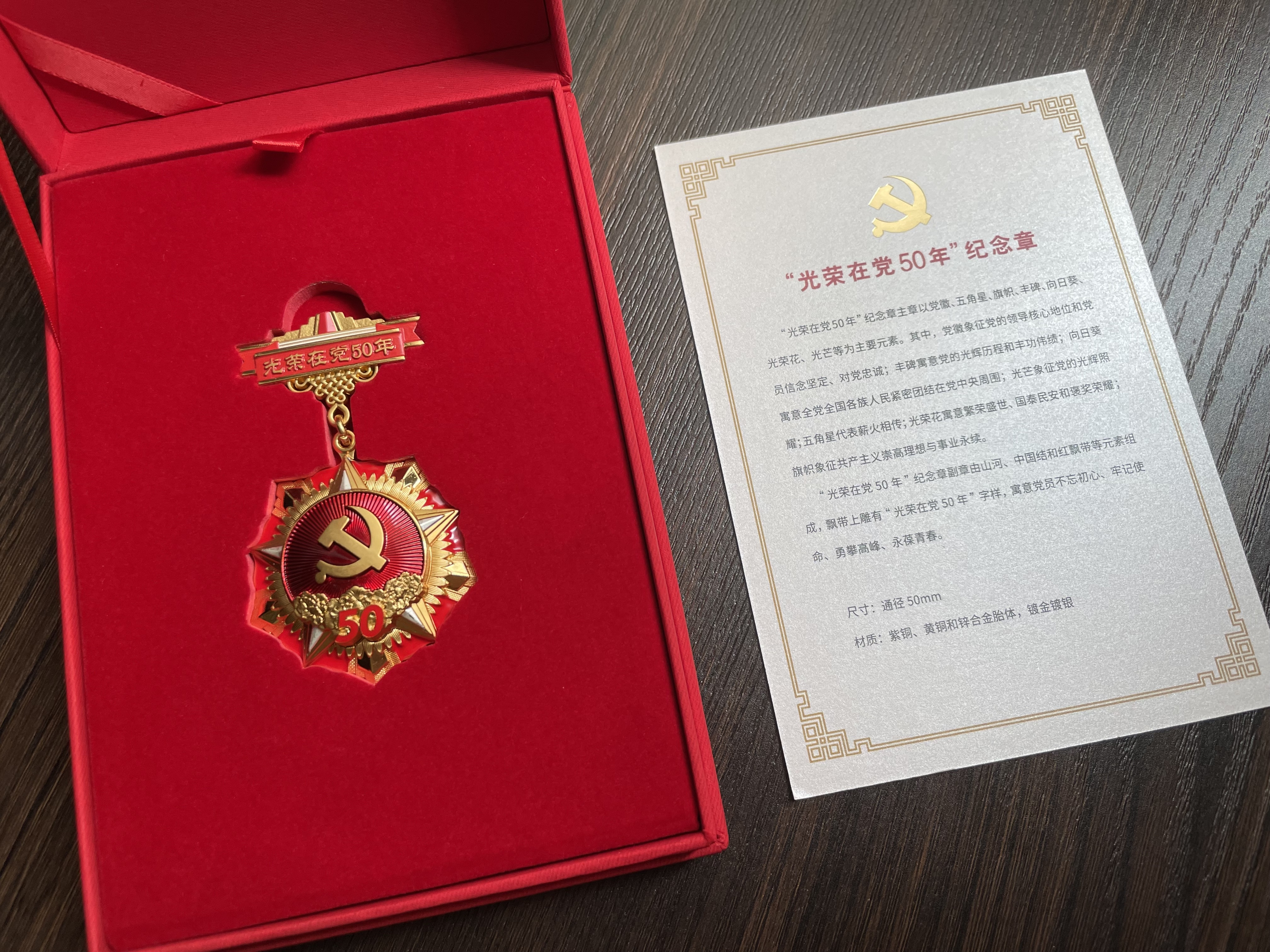
The Commemorative medal and its introduction card

=== Commemorative coins ===
On 21 June 2021, the People's Bank of China issued a set of nine commemorative coins for the anniversary.

=== Medal ===
Since June 2021, the "Glorious 50 Years in the Party" Commemorative Medal had been awarded, and the awarding continued until 1 July. It consisted of the party emblem, a five-pointed star, the flag, a monument, a sunflower, and other elements. The CCP award ceremony to present the 1 July Medal to outstanding CCP members took place on 29 June 2021.

== Gallery ==
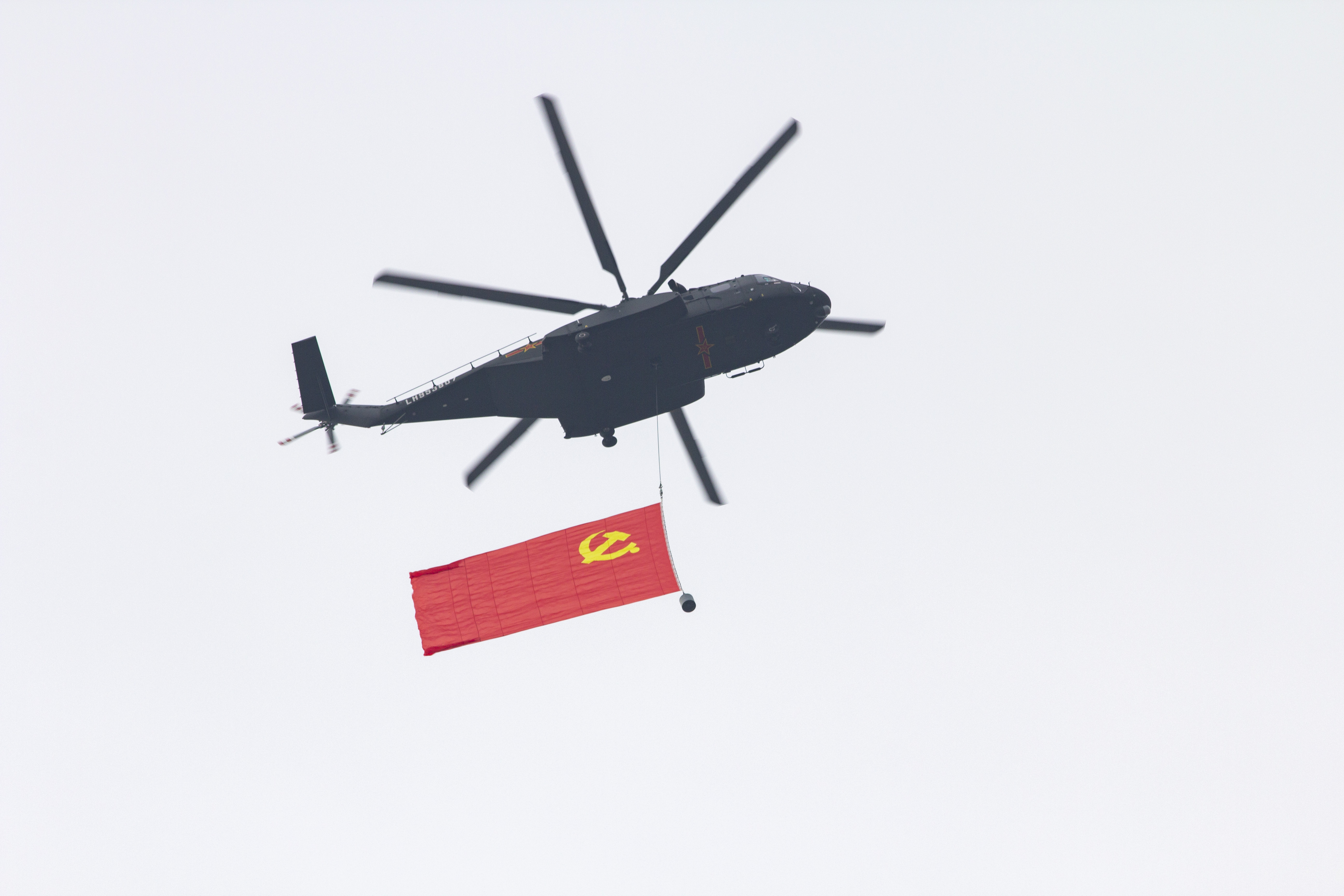
Z-8L carrying the flag of the Chinese Communist Party flying over Beijing on 1 July 2021.

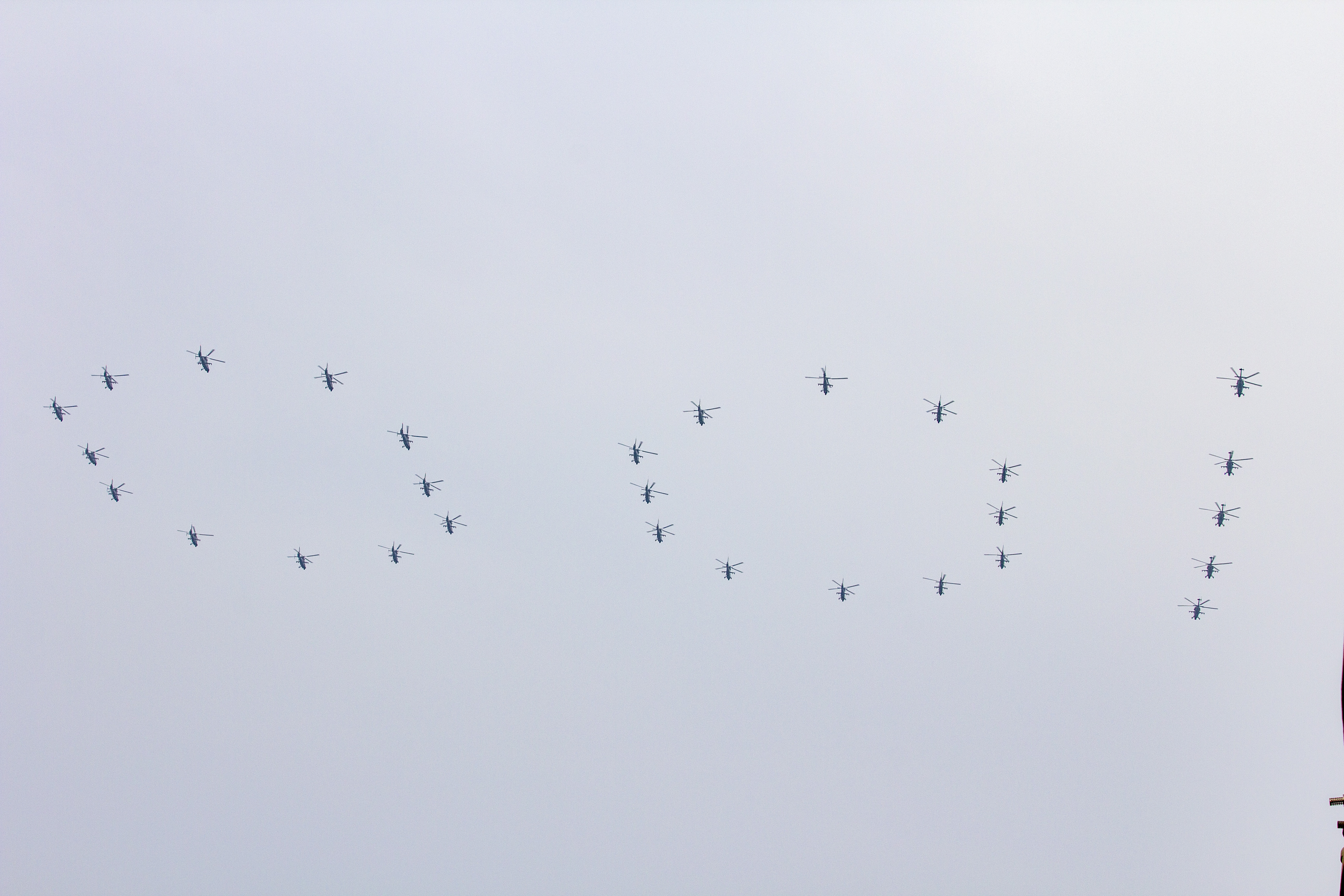
29 Z-19's forming the number "100".

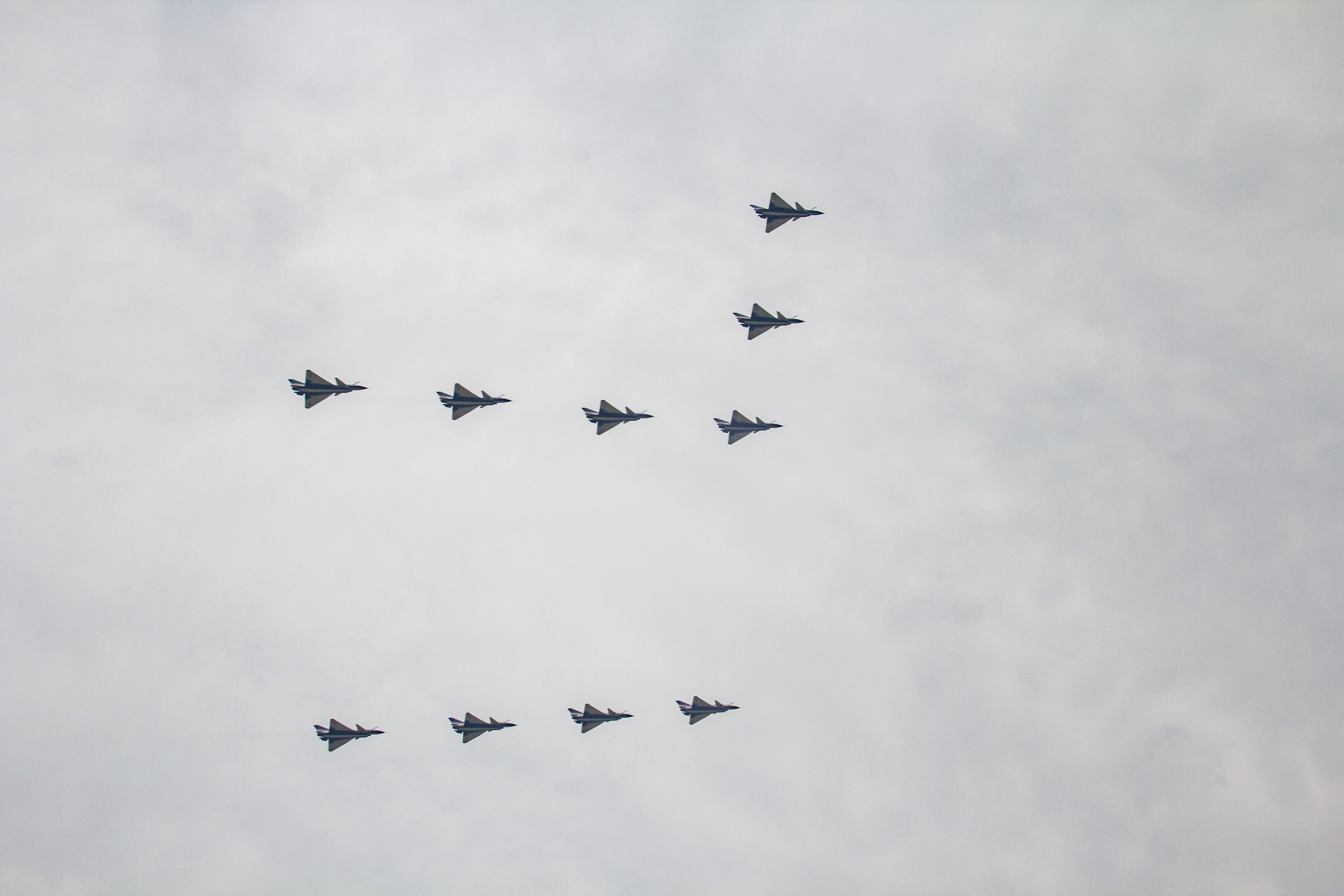
10 J-10's forming the number "71".

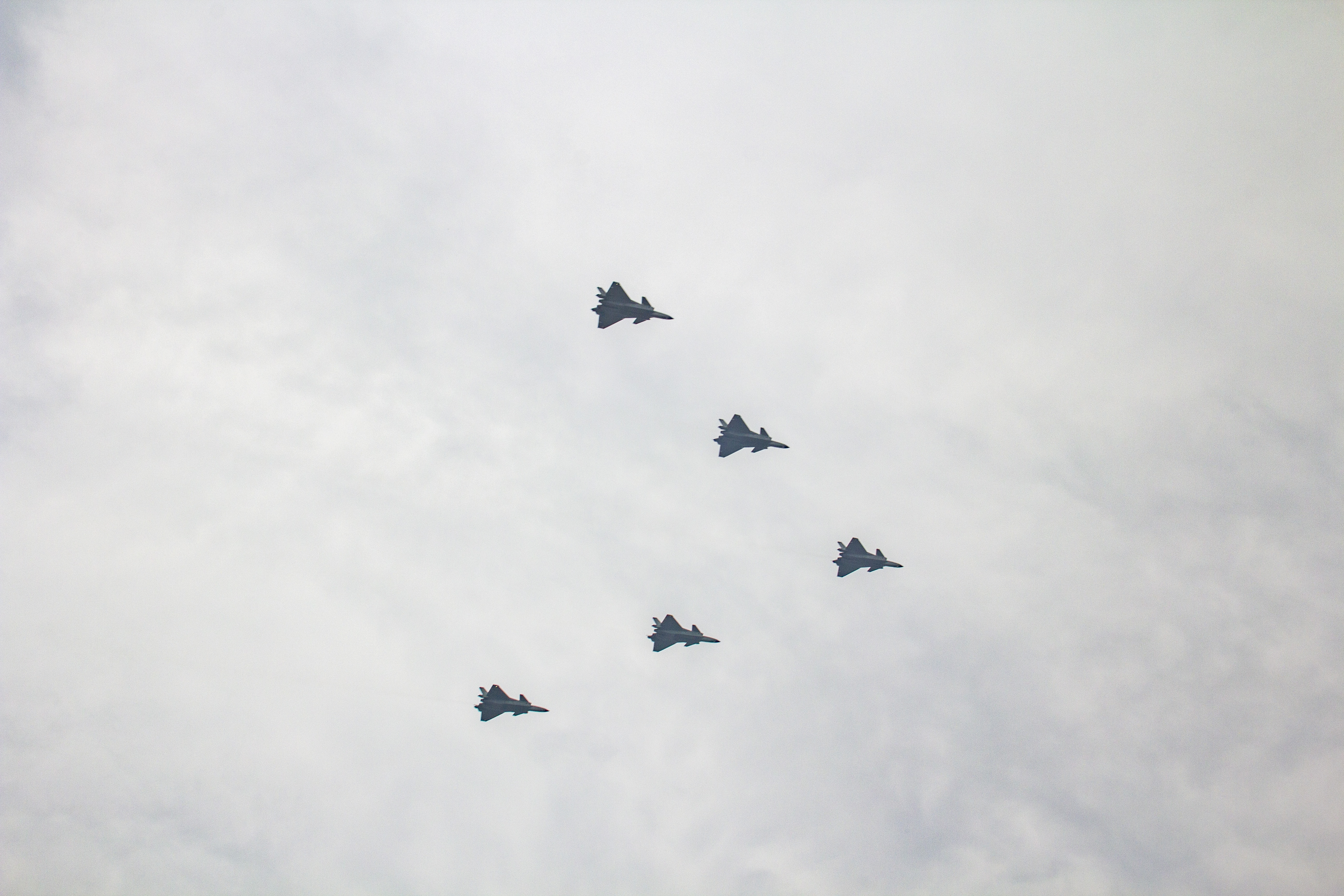
The first of three groups of 5 J-20 fighters.

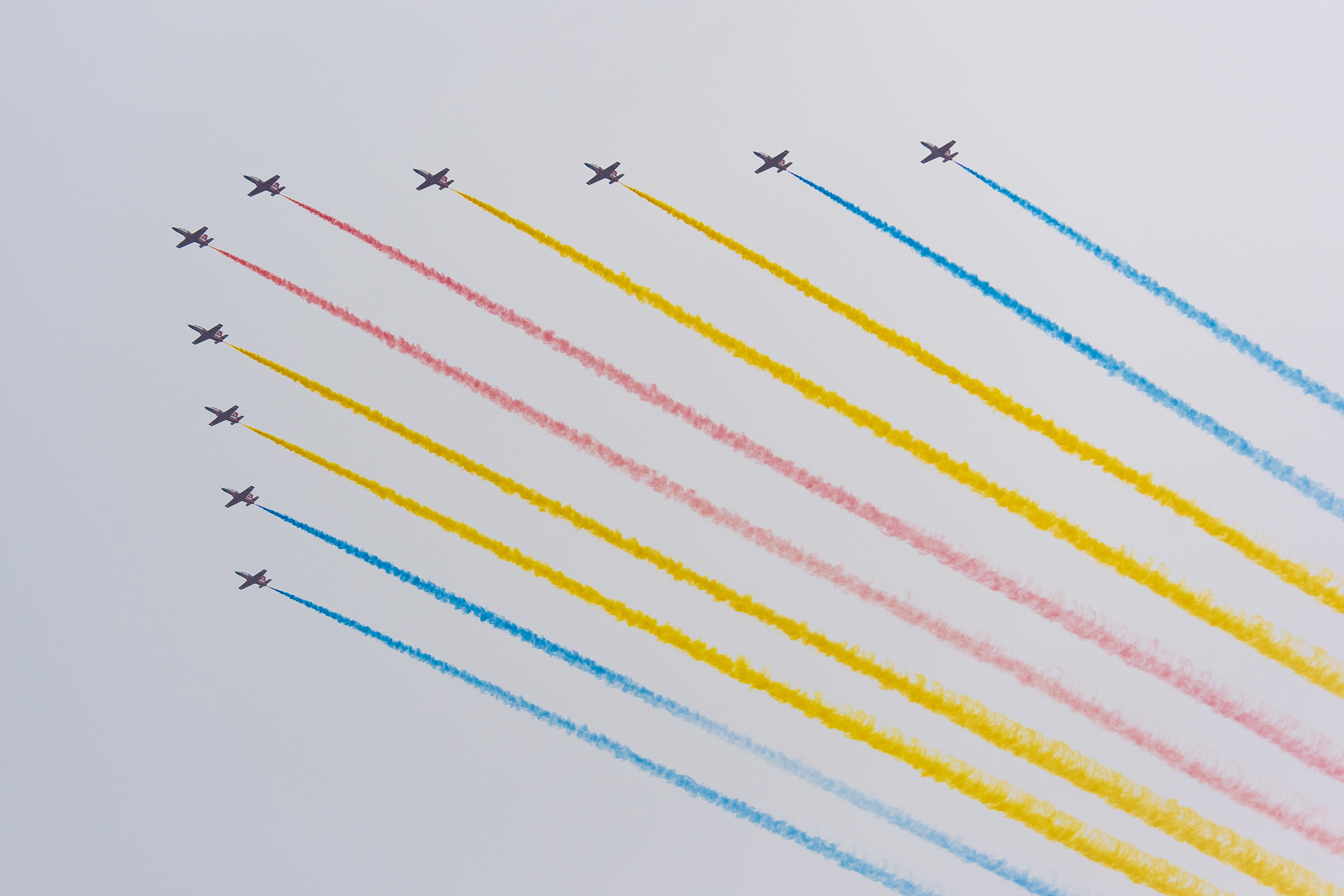
10 JL-8's formation.

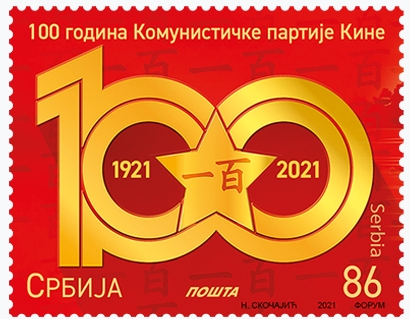
2021 postage stamp of Serbia, commemorating the event

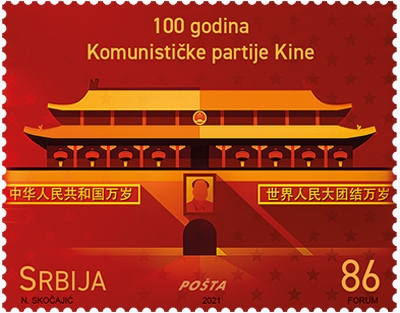
2021 postage stamp of Serbia, commemorating the event

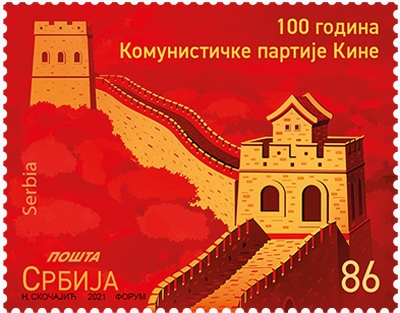
2021 postage stamp of Serbia, commemorating the event

== See also ==
- 70th anniversary of the People's Republic of China
- 100th Anniversary of the Xinhai Revolution and Republic of China
- Two Centenaries
