= 42nd Street (Manhattan) =

West-east street in Manhattan, New York

- Lincoln Highway (west of Broadway); New 42nd Street (8th to 7th Avenues)
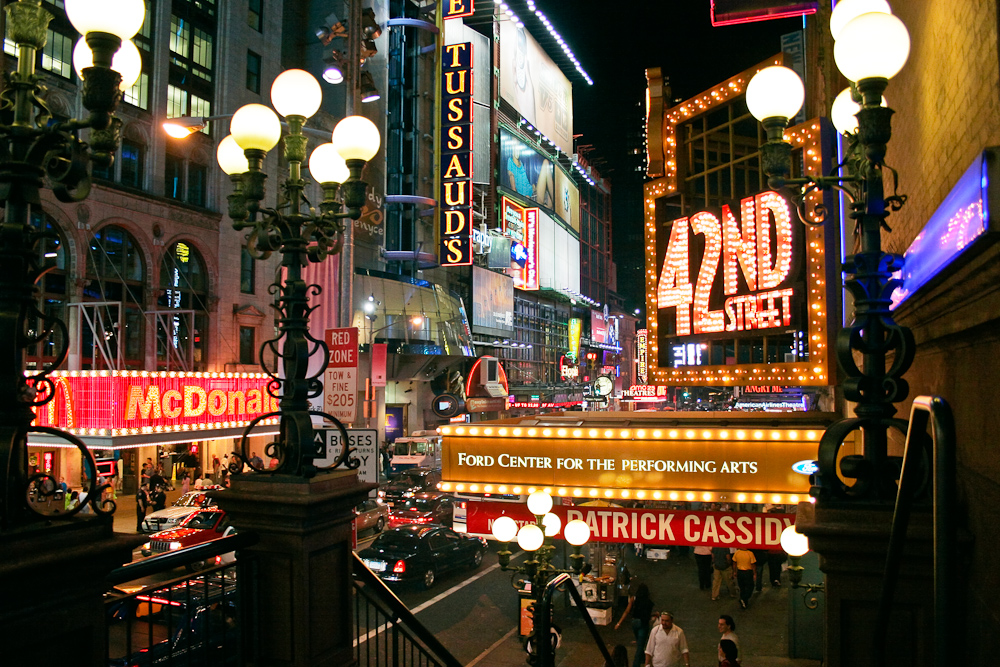
- Looking west between Seventh and Eighth Avenue
- Maintained by: NYCDOT
- Length: 2.0 mi (3.2 km)
- Location: Manhattan, New York City, U.S.
- Postal code: 10036, 10018, 10017, 10168
- West end: NY 9A / West Side Highway in Hell's Kitchen
- East end: FDR Drive in Murray Hill / Midtown East
- North: 43rd Street (west of 1st Avenue); 48th Street (east of 1st Avenue)
- South: 41st Street (west of 6th Avenue); 40th Street (6th to 5th Avenues); 41st Street (east of 5th Avenue)

Construction
- Commissioned: March 1811

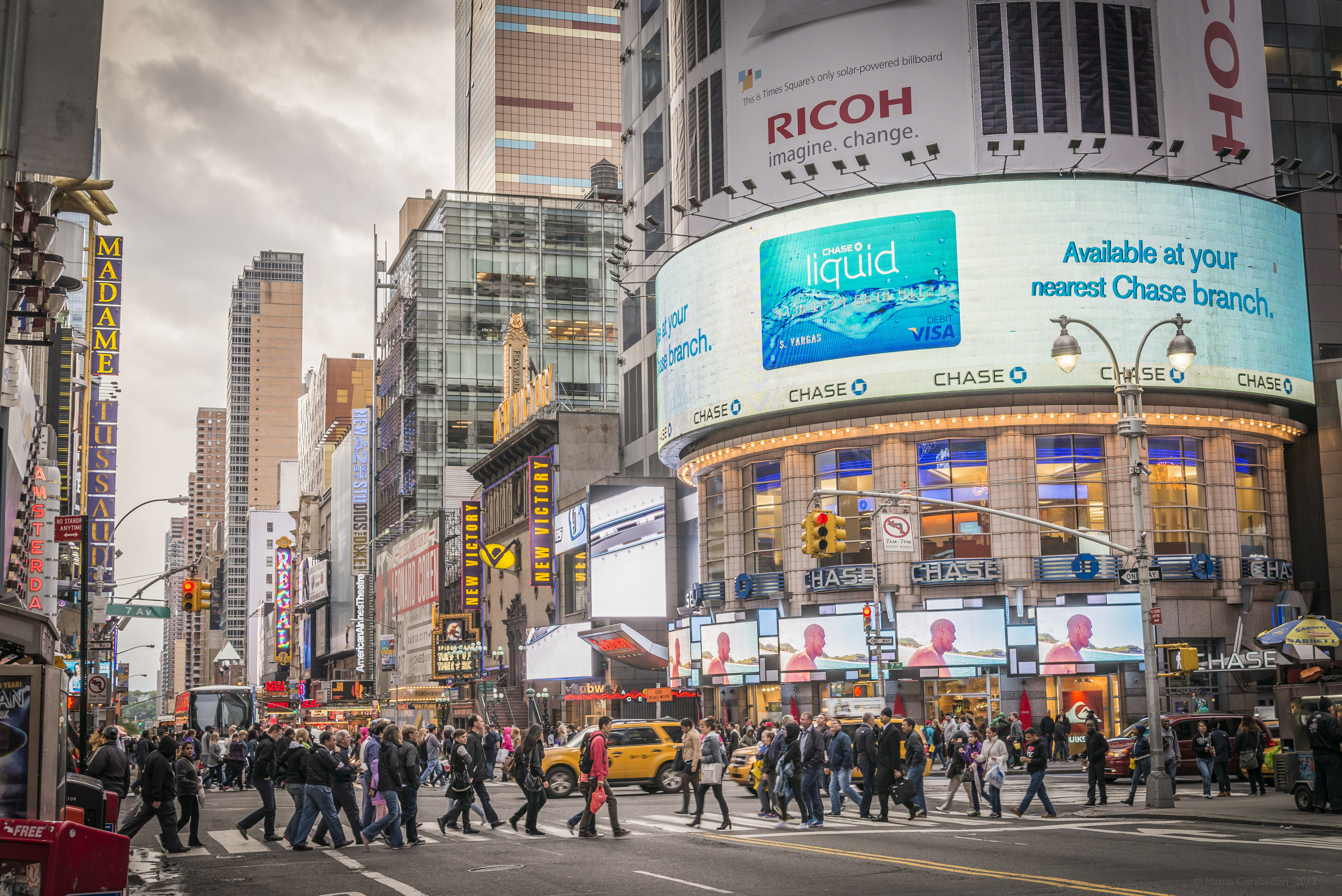
Crossing 7th Avenue in Times Square

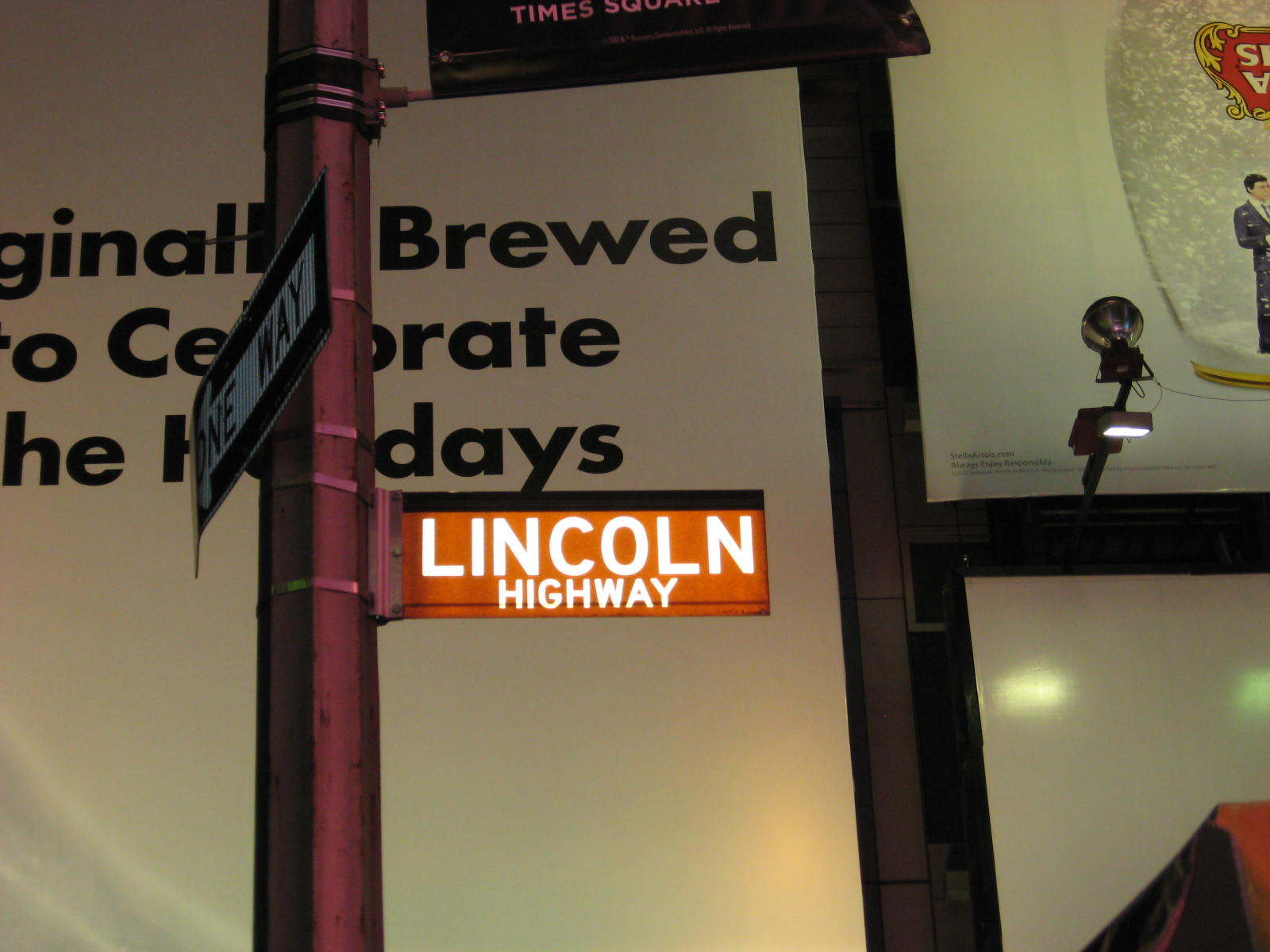
Sign marking the eastern terminus of the Lincoln Highway, which begins on 42nd Street in Times Square and continues westward all the way across the United States to San Francisco, California

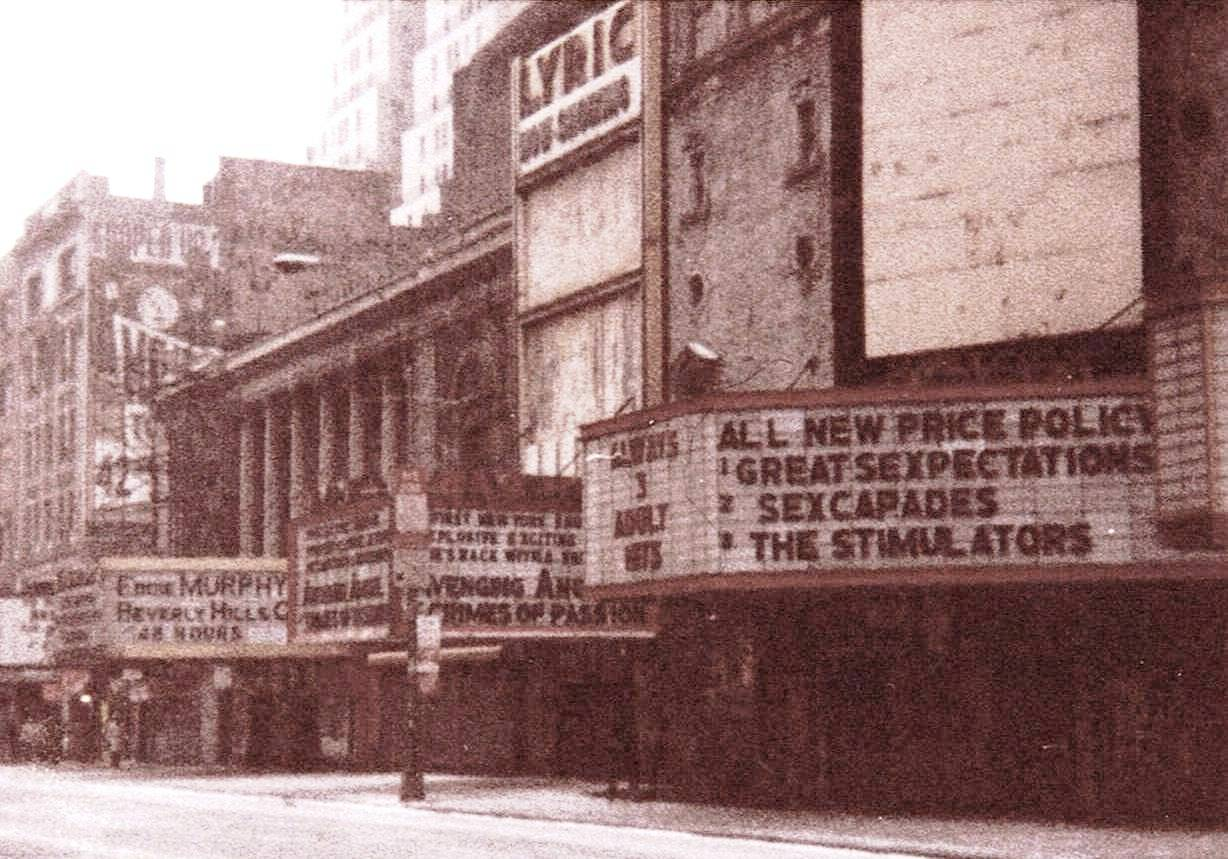
Grindhouse movie theaters on 42nd Street in 1985 before its renovation; the 200 block of W. 42nd Street; former Lyric Theatre facade and nearby buildings

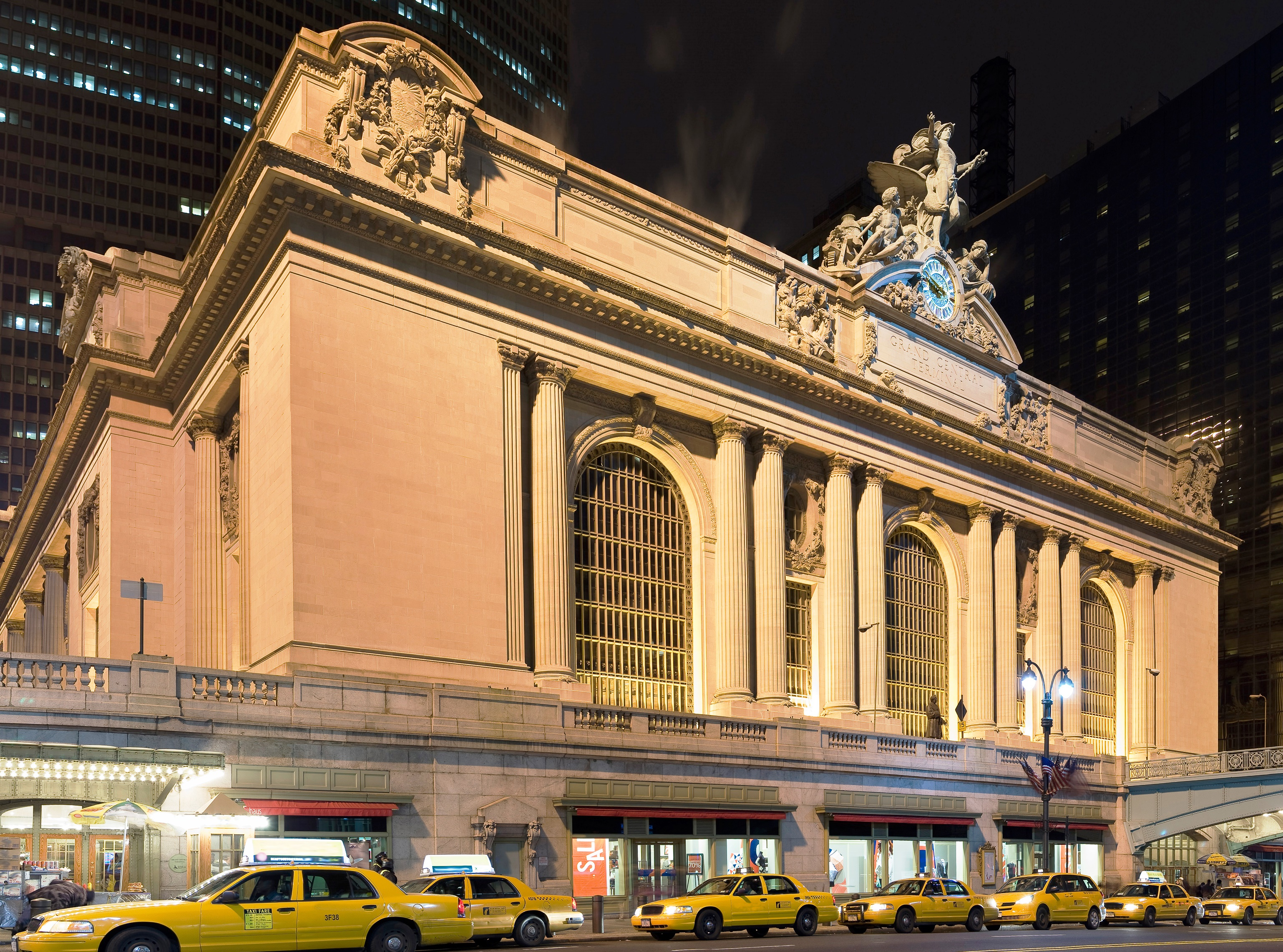
Grand Central Terminal at night, as seen from the west on 42nd Street

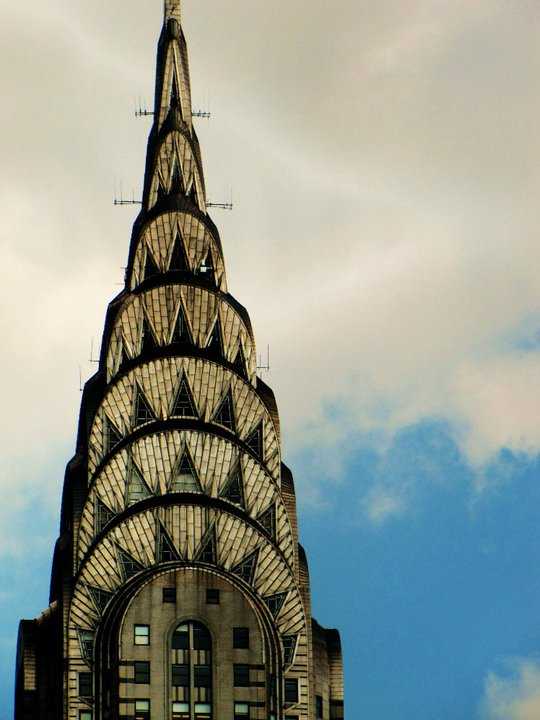
The Chrysler Building is located at Lexington Avenue and 42nd Street.

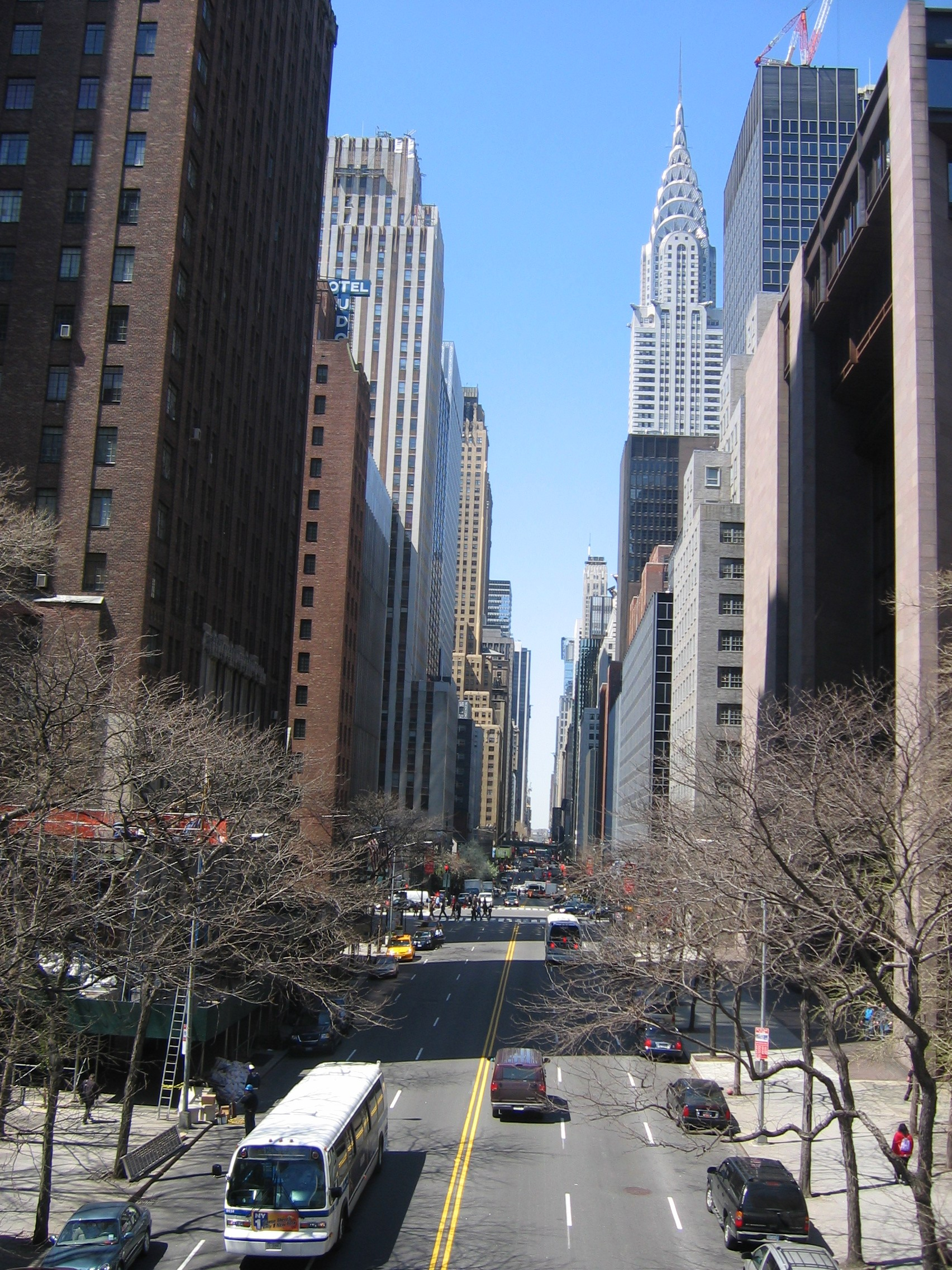
Looking west from bridge at 1st Avenue. The Ford Foundation Building is visible in the right foreground.

42nd Street is a major crosstown street in the New York City borough of Manhattan, spanning the entire breadth of Midtown Manhattan, from Turtle Bay at the East River, to Hell's Kitchen at the Hudson River on the West Side. The street has several major landmarks, including (from east to west) the headquarters of the United Nations, the Chrysler Building, Grand Central Terminal, the New York Public Library Main Branch, Times Square, and the Port Authority Bus Terminal.

The street is known for its theaters, especially near the intersection with Broadway at Times Square, and as such is also the name of the region of the theater district (and, at times, the red-light district) near that intersection. The street also has a section of off-Broadway theaters known as Theatre Row.

== History ==
=== Early history ===
During the American Revolutionary War, a cornfield near 42nd Street and Fifth Avenue was where General George Washington angrily attempted to rally his troops after the British landing at Kip's Bay, which scattered many of the American militiamen. Washington's attempt put him in danger of being captured, and his officers had to persuade him to leave. The rout eventually subsided into an orderly retreat.

John Jacob Astor purchased a 70-acre (28 ha) farm in 1803 that ran from 42nd Street to 46th Street west of Broadway to the Hudson River.

=== 19th century ===
The street was designated by the Commissioners' Plan of 1811 that established the Manhattan street grid as one of 15 crosstown (east-west) streets that would be 100 feet (30 m) in width, while other streets were designated as 60 feet (18 m) in width.

In 1835, the city's Street Committee, after receiving numerous complaints about lack of access for development above 14th Street, decided to open up all lots which had already been plotted on the city grid up to 42nd Street, which thus became – for a time – the northern boundary of the city.

Cornelius Vanderbilt began the construction of Grand Central Depot in 1869 on 42nd Street at Fourth Avenue as the terminal for his Central, Hudson, Harlem and New Haven commuter rail lines, because city regulations required that trains be pulled by horse below 42nd Street. The Depot, which opened in 1871, was replaced by Grand Central Terminal in 1913.

Between the 1870s and 1890s, 42nd Street became the uptown boundary of the mainstream theater district, which started around 23rd Street, as the entertainment district of the Tenderloin gradually moved northward.

=== Early 20th century ===
42nd Street was developed relatively late compared to other crosstown thoroughfares such as 14th Street and 23rd Street, which had grown during the American Civil War, and 57th Street, which became prominent in the 1890s. It was only after the beginning of the 20th century that the street saw entertainment venues being developed around Times Square and upscale office space around Grand Central Terminal. In the first two decades of the 20th century, eleven venues for legitimate theater were built within one block of West 42nd Street between Seventh and Eighth Avenues.

The corner of 42nd Street and Broadway, at the southeast corner of Times Square, is the eastern terminus of the Lincoln Highway, the first road across the United States, which was conceived and mapped in 1913.

An elevated railroad line, running above East 42nd Street from Third Avenue to the Grand Central station, was closed in 1923, leading to the development of such structures as the Chanin Building and 110 East 42nd Street west of Lexington Avenue. The street east of Lexington Avenue continued to be made up of mostly low-rise buildings; these blocks were adjacent to the elevated IRT Second Avenue Line and IRT Third Avenue Line, and accordingly, initially considered unattractive for major development. By the 1920s, The New York Times reported that several high-rise developments were "radically changing the old-time conditions" along East 42nd Street, including the Chanin, Lincoln, Chrysler, and Daily News Buildings, as well as Tudor City.

The block of 42nd Street between Second and First Avenues was originally only 40 feet (12 m) wide, passing through a steep bluff known as Prospect Hill. On either side of the street, 30-foot-wide (9.1 m) service roads ascended to Tudor City Place, which crossed over 42nd Street. To improve access to the newly developed United Nations headquarters, in 1948, the city government proposed widening that block of 42nd Street, eliminating the service roads, and constructing a viaduct to carry Tudor City Place over 42nd Street. Despite opposition from Tudor City residents, city officials said the street widening was necessary because 42nd Street already carried high amounts of vehicular traffic to and from the nearby FDR Drive. The New York City Planning Commission approved the plans in September 1948, and the Board of Estimate approved $1.848 million for the project that December. The board provisionally authorized the street widening in June 1949, and Manhattan's borough president announced in December 1949 that work would commence shortly. The neighboring stretch of 42nd Street was temporarily closed from February 1951 to October 1952 while the widening was underway.

=== Theatrical decline ===
West 42nd Street, meanwhile, prospered as a theater and entertainment district until World War II. According to historian Robert A. M. Stern, West 42nd Street's decline started in 1946, when the streetcars on 42nd Street were replaced by less efficient buses.

Lloyd Bacon and Busby Berkeley's 1933 film musical 42nd Street, starring 30s heartthrobs Dick Powell and Ruby Keeler, displays the bawdy and colorful mixture of Broadway denizens and lowlifes in Manhattan during the Depression. In 1980, it was turned into a successful Broadway musical which ran until 1989, and which was revived for a four-year run in 2001. In the words of the Al Dubin and Harry Warren title song, on 42nd Street one could find:

Little nifties from the Fifties, innocent and sweet,

Sexy ladies from the Eighties who are indiscreet,

They're side by side, they're glorified,

Where the underworld can meet the elite

Naughty, gawdy, bawdy, sporty, Forty-second Street!

From the late 1950s until the late 1980s, 42nd Street, nicknamed the "Deuce", was the cultural center of American grindhouse theaters, which spawned an entire subculture. The book Sleazoid Express, a travelogue of the 42nd Street grindhouses and the films they showed, describes the unique blend of people who made up the theater-goers:

depressives hiding from jobs, sexual obsessives, inner-city people seeking cheap diversions, teenagers skipping school, adventurous couples on dates, couples-chasers peeking on them, people getting high, homeless people sleeping, pickpockets...

While the street outside the theaters was populated with:

phony drug salesman ... low-level drug dealers, chain snatchers ... [j]unkies alone in their heroin/cocaine dreamworld ... predatory chickenhawks spying on underage trade looking for pickups ... male prostitutes of all ages ... [t]ranssexuals, hustlers, and closety gays with a fetishistic homo- or heterosexual itch to scratch ... It was common to see porn stars whose films were playing at the adult houses promenade down the block. ... Were you a freak? Not when you stepped onto the Deuce. Being a freak there would get you money, attention, entertainment, a starring part in a movie. Or maybe a robbery and a beating.

For much of the mid and late 20th century, the area of 42nd Street near Times Square was home to activities often considered unsavory, including peep shows.

East 42nd Street was, for some time, spared from similar decline, especially east of Third Avenue, where the development of the United Nations supported a thriving business district and prompted the widening of that section of 42nd Street. The demolition of the Second and Third Avenue elevated lines by the 1950s led to increased development on East 42nd Street, such as annexes to the Chrysler and Daily News Buildings, as well as the construction of the Socony-Mobil and Ford Foundation Buildings. By the 1960s, East 42nd Street between Park and Second Avenues contained more headquarters of industries than any other place in the United States except Chicago or Pittsburgh. During this time, there was much development outside the rundown entertainment district of Times Square, somewhat offsetting the perception of that part of 42nd Street.

=== Revitalization ===
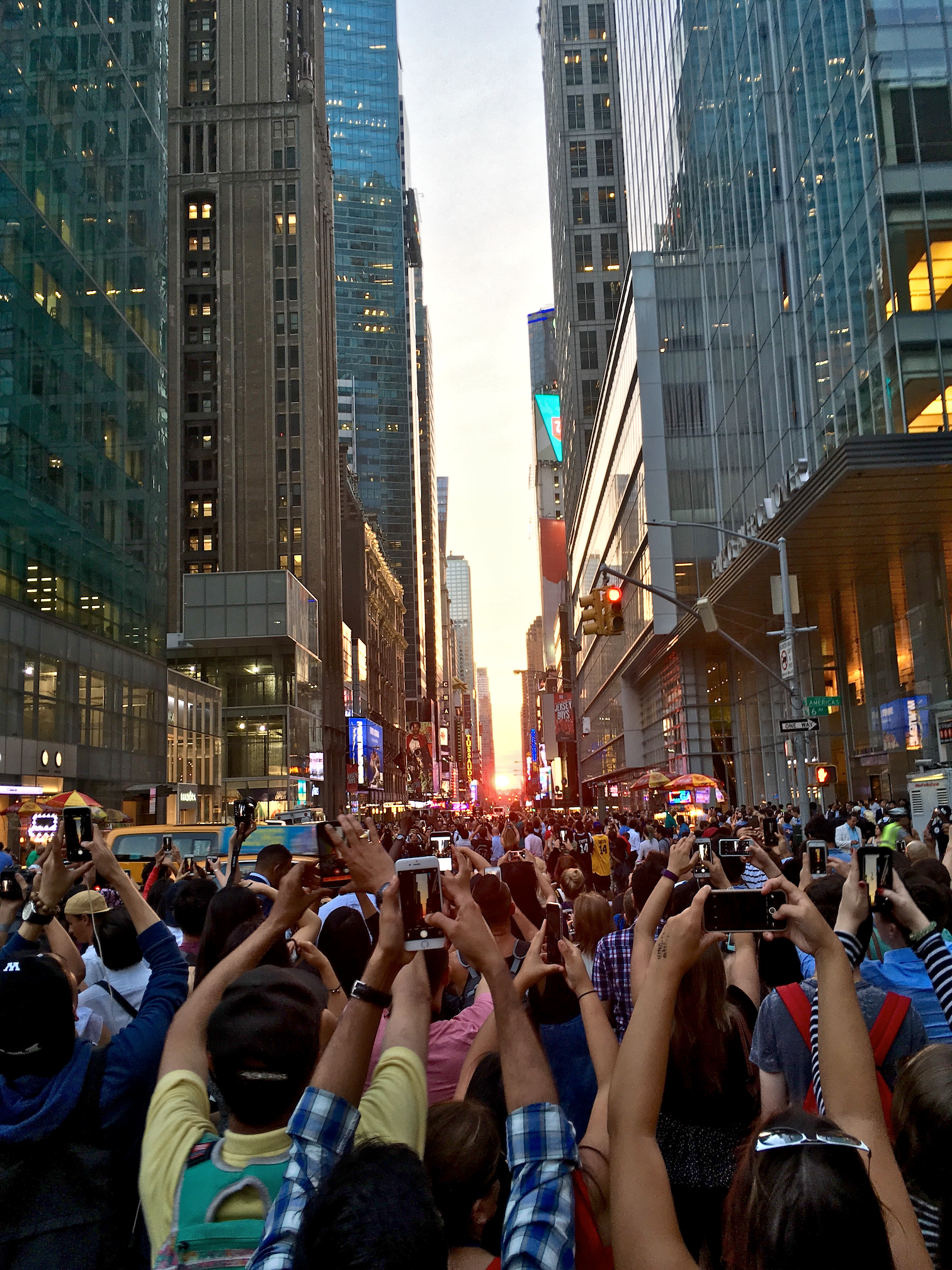
Tourists observing Manhattanhenge, blocking the entire intersection of 42nd Street and the Avenue of the Americas, looking westward at the sunset on July 12, 2016

In the early 1990s, the city government encouraged a cleanup of the Times Square area. In 1990, the city government took over six of the historic theaters on the block of 42nd Street between Seventh and Eighth Avenues, and New 42nd Street, a not-for-profit organization, was formed to oversee their renovation and reuse, as well as to construct new theaters and a rehearsal space. In 1993, Disney Theatrical Productions bought the New Amsterdam Theatre, which it renovated a few years later. Since the mid-1990s, the block has again become home to mainstream theaters and several multi-screen mainstream movie theaters, along with shops, restaurants, hotels, and attractions such as Madame Tussauds wax museum and Ripley's Believe It or Not that draw millions to the city every year. This area is now co-signed as "New 42nd Street" to signify this change.

In the 1990s, the renovation of Bryant Park between Fifth and Sixth Avenues, as well as the renovations of Times Square and Grand Central Terminal, led to increases in office occupancy along both sections of 42nd Street.

In 2025, the New York City Department of Transportation announced that the block of 42nd Street between Seventh and Eighth Avenues would be upgraded to protect it from terrorist attacks. The project, budgeted at $57 million, would include adding steel bollards, installing sewage pipes, and widening the sidewalks and bus lanes.

== Notable places ==
(from East to West):

- Headquarters of the United Nations, First Avenue
- Tudor City apartments, First Avenue
- Ford Foundation Building, between First and Second Avenues, former site of the Hospital for the Ruptured and Crippled (now known as the Hospital for Special Surgery)
- Church of the Covenant, between First and Second Avenues
- Daily News Building, Second Avenue
- Pfizer Building, Second Avenue
- Socony-Mobil Building, between Third and Lexington Avenues
- Chrysler Building, Lexington Avenue
- Chanin Building, Lexington Avenue
- 110 East 42nd Street (formerly Bowery Savings Bank Building, now Cipriani S.A.), between Lexington and Park Avenues
- Pershing Square Building, Park Avenue
- Pershing Square, Park Avenue
- Grand Central Terminal, Park Avenue
- One Grand Central Place, Vanderbilt Avenue
- One Vanderbilt, Vanderbilt Avenue
- 500 Fifth Avenue
- New York Public Library Main Branch, Fifth Avenue
- W. R. Grace Building, between Fifth and Sixth Avenues
- Salmon Tower Building, between Fifth and Sixth Avenues
- Aeolian Building, between Fifth and Sixth Avenues
- Bryant Park, between Fifth and Sixth Avenues
- Shayne's Emporium, west of Sixth Avenue
- Bank of America Tower, Sixth Avenue
- Bush Tower, between Sixth and Seventh Avenues
- 4 Times Square, at Broadway
- The Knickerbocker Hotel, at Broadway
- One Times Square, the building from which the ball drops on New Year's Eve, Broadway and Seventh Avenue
- Times Square Tower, Broadway and Seventh Avenue
- 3 Times Square, at Seventh Avenue
- 5 Times Square, at Seventh Avenue
- New Amsterdam Theatre, between Seventh and Eighth Avenues
- New Victory Theatre, between Seventh and Eighth Avenues
- Todd Haimes Theatre and New 42nd Street, between Seventh and Eighth Avenues
- Candler Building, between Seventh and Eighth Avenues
- Empire Theatre, between Seventh and Eighth Avenues
- Port Authority Bus Terminal, at Eighth Avenue
- Eleven Times Square, at Eighth Avenue
- 330 West 42nd Street, formerly McGraw-Hill Building, between Eighth and Ninth Avenues
- Holy Cross Church, between Eighth and Ninth Avenues
- Theatre Row, between Ninth and Eleventh Avenues
- Silver Towers apartments, at Eleventh Avenue
- Atelier Skyscraper Condominium, between Eleventh and Twelfth Avenue
- Circle Line Sightseeing Cruises ferry terminal, Twelfth Avenue

== Transportation ==
=== Subway ===
Every New York City Subway line that crosses 42nd Street has a stop on 42nd Street:

- Times Square–42nd Street and 42nd Street–Port Authority Bus Terminal (1, 2, 3, 7, <7>, A, C, E, N, Q, R, W, and S trains)
- 42nd Street/Fifth Avenue-Bryant Park (7, <7>, B, D, F, <F>, and M trains)
- Grand Central–42nd Street (4, 5, 6, <6>, 7, <7>, and S trains)

There are two subway lines under 42nd Street. The 42nd Street Shuttle (S train) runs under 42nd Street between Broadway/Seventh Avenue (Times Square) and Park Avenue (Grand Central). The IRT Flushing Line (7 and <7> trains) curves from Eleventh Avenue to 41st Street, under which it runs until Fifth Avenue; shifts to 42nd Street between Fifth and Madison Avenues; and continues under the East River to Queens. Each line stops at Times Square and Grand Central, though the Fifth Avenue station is also served by the 7 and <7> trains.

In the past, every former IRT elevated line had a station at 42nd Street:

- 42nd Street on the IRT Second Avenue Line
- 42nd Street on the IRT Third Avenue Line
- 42nd Street on the IRT Sixth Avenue Line
- 42nd Street on the IRT Ninth Avenue Line

A fifth station extended over 42nd Street as a western spur from the Third Avenue Line to Grand Central Depot, later Grand Central Station, and finally Grand Central Terminal.

=== Bus ===
MTA Regional Bus Operations's M42 bus runs the length of 42nd Street between the Circle Line Sightseeing Cruises ferry terminal on the Hudson River and the headquarters of the United Nations on the East River. Westbound service originates at First Avenue. Its predecessor, the 42nd Street Crosstown Line streetcar, had used 42nd Street until 1946. In 2019, bus lanes were installed along the length of the street. There have also been proposals for light rail on 42nd Street over the years, such as in 2005.

42nd Street is also used by the SIM8, SIM22, SIM25, SIM26 and SIM30 Staten Island express buses.

== In popular culture ==
"Forty-deuce" is street slang for Manhattan's former live peep show district on 42nd Street. The 1982 film Forty Deuce and the 2017 TV series The Deuce reference the phrase "forty-deuce".

Notable CCP Politburo Standing Committee member Wang Huning referenced 42nd Street in his book America Against America mentioning its "pornographic culture" as an example of the "decadence of high commodification".

An unspecified 42nd Street Subway Station is featured in Street Fighter III: Third Strike as the stage, "Subway Station". Two versions of this stage exist for the characters Alex and Ken Masters. Alex's version is in a bright orange tint and features construction equipment, while Ken's version has a blue tint and is clear of equipment. The famous Evo Moment 37 occurred on the Subway Station stage since Ken was the challenging player.

== See also ==
- Theater District, Manhattan
- Times Square

Lincoln Highway
Previous state: New Jersey	New York	Next state: Terminus
