= Jiang Jinquan =

Chinese politician

- 江金权
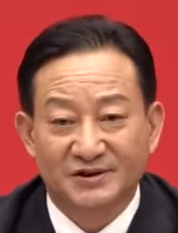
- Jiang in 2021

Director of the Central Policy Research Office
- In office 30 October 2020 – January 2026
- General Secretary: Xi Jinping
- Preceded by: Wang Huning
- Succeeded by: Tang Fangyu

Personal details
- Born: September 1959 (age 67) Xishui, Hubei, China
- Party: Chinese Communist Party
- Education: Hubei Normal University; Huazhong University of Science and Technology

Chinese name
- Simplified Chinese: 江金权
- Traditional Chinese: 江金權
Transcriptions
Standard Mandarin
- Hanyu Pinyin: Jiāng Jīnquán

Jiang Jinquan (Chinese: 江金权; born September 1959) is a Chinese politician who served as the director of the Central Policy Research Office from October 2020 to January 2026. Previously, he served as deputy director of the Central Policy Research Office, chief inspector of the CCDI Discipline Inspection Office at the State-owned Assets Supervision and Administration Commission, and executive deputy director of the Central Policy Research Office.

== Biography ==
Jiang was born in Xishui, Hubei. He studied at Hubei Normal University, majoring in Chinese. He studied economics at the Huazhong University of Science and Technology.

Jiang started his career in the Organization Department of the CCP Hubei Provincial Committee. Then, he worked in the Central Policy Research Office (CPRO) and specialized in party-building research. He moved up the ranks in the CPRO and eventually became deputy director of the office.

In May 2016, Jiang was appointed the chief inspector of the CCDI Discipline Inspection Office at the State-owned Assets Supervision and Administration Commission. In his capacity as chief inspector, Jiang was appointed a member of the 19th Central Discipline Inspection Commission in October 2017.

In February 2018, Jiang returned to the CPRO to serve as its executive deputy director. He was the principal deputy of CPRO Director Wang Huning, who was elevated to the Politburo Standing Committee at the 19th Party Congress in October 2017. Jiang succeeded Wang as director of the CPRO in October 2020. As director of the CPRO, Jiang accompanied General Secretary Xi Jinping on almost all of his domestic and international trips. At the 20th Party Congress, Jiang was not appointed a full member of the 20th Central Committee. In January 2026, he was succeeded by Tang Fangyu as the CPRO director.

Party political offices
Preceded by Qiang Weidong	Chief Inspector of the CCDI Discipline Inspection Office at the State-owned Assets Supervision and Administration Commission; 2016–2018	Succeeded by Chen Chaoying
Preceded by Wang Xiaohui	Executive Deputy Director of the Central Policy Research Office; 2018–2020	Vacant
Preceded by Wang Huning	Director of the Central Policy Research Office; 2020–present	Incumbent
