= List of domestic trips made by Xi Jinping (2022–present) =

This is a list of domestic trips made by Xi Jinping since 2022, when he was re-elected as general secretary of the Chinese Communist Party for a third term.

== Summary ==
This list excludes trips made within Beijing, the capital of China in which the Zhongnanhai, the principal workplace of Xi, is located. Here are the number of visits per state or territory he traveled to:

- One: Anhui, Chongqing, Fujian, Gansu, Guangxi, Guizhou, Hainan, Heilongjiang, Hubei, Hunan, Jiangxi, Liaoning, Macau, Inner Mongolia, Ningxia, Qinghai, Shanxi, Tibet, Yunnan, Zhejiang
- Two: Henan, Inner Mongolia, Jiangsu, Shanghai, Sichuan, Tianjin, Xinjiang
- Three: Guangdong, Hebei, Shaanxi, Shandong

International

- 15 trips, 19 countries; see List of international trips made by Xi Jinping

A map of China highlighting places visited by Xi Jinping during his third term, as of November 2026. One visit Two visits Three visits Four visits Beijing

== 2022 ==
Region	Areas visited	Dates	Details
Shaanxi	Yan'an	26–28 October	First visit outside Beijing after the 20th National Congress of the Chinese Communist Party. Visited Nangou Village, Gaoqiao Town, Ansai District, Yan'an. Also visited Zaoyuan Campus of Yan'an Middle School.
Henan	Anyang	26–28 October	Visited the Red Flag Canal Memorial Hall in Linzhou City, Anyang. Also visited the Yin Ruins.

== 2023 ==
Region	Areas visited	Dates	Details
Guangdong	Zhanjiang, Maoming, Guangzhou	10–13 April	Visited Xuwen Port, the Marine Aquaculture Seed Engineering Project, the Jinniu Island, Baiqiao Village, Baiqiao Longan and Lychee Professional Cooperative in Genzi Town, as well as Guangzhou.
Hebei	Xiong'an, Cangzhou, Shijiazhuang	10–12 May	Chaired a symposium on further promoting the Coordinated Development of the Beijing-Tianjin-Hebei Region. Also visited Xianzhuang area of Jiucheng Town, Huanghua City, Huanghua Port coal terminal in Cangzhou and China Electronics Technology Group Corporation (CETC) Industrial Base Research Institute in Shijiazhuang.
Shaanxi	Yuncheng, Xi'an	16–19 May	Visited Yuncheng Museum. Also visited Xi'an as part of the China–Central Asia Summit.
Inner Mongolia	Bayannur, Hohhot	6–9 June	Held a symposium on strengthening comprehensive desertification prevention and control and promoting the construction of key ecological projects.
Jiangsu	Suzhou, Nanjing	5–7 July	Visited the Suzhou Industrial Park, the Suzhou Huaxing Yuanchuang Technology and the Pingjiang Historical and Cultural District. Also visited the Purple Mountain Laboratories and the Eastern Theater Command in Nanjing.
Sichuan	Chengdu, Guangyuan, Deyang	25–28 July	Visited the Cuiyun Corridor in Jiange County and Sanxingdui Museum in Guangyuan. Also visited the headquarters of the Western Theater Command Air Force.
	Hanzhong	29 July	Visited the Hanzhong City Museum while returning to Beijing.
Xinjiang	Ürümqi	26 August	Visited Ürümqi after returning from the 15th BRICS summit.
Heilongjiang	Greater Khingan, Harbin	6–8 September	Visited disaster-recovery efforts.
Zhejiang	Jinhua, Shaoxing	20–21 September	Visited Lizu Village, Houzhai Subdistrict, Yiwu City. Also visited Yiwu International Trade City, as well as the Zhejiang East Canal Cultural Park in Shaoxing.
Shandong	Zaozhuang	22 September	Visited Zaozhuang while en route to return to Beijing.
Jiangxi	Jiujiang, Jingdezhen, Shangrao	10–13 October	Visited the Yangtze River National Cultural Park, Sinopec Jiujiang Branch, Taoyangli Historical and Cultural District in Jingdezhen, Changhe Aircraft Industry, Raohe River Source National Wetland Park, and the Shimen Natural Village.
Hebei	Baoding	10 November	Visited disaster-recovery efforts.
Shanghai		28 November–2 December	Visited Shanghai Futures Exchange, the Innovation Achievements Exhibition in Zhangjiang Science City and the Minhang District.
Jiangsu	Yancheng	3 December	Visited the New Fourth Army Memorial Hall while en route to return to Beijing.
Guangxi	Nanning, Laibin	14–15 December	Conducted research on projects open to foreign investment, communities, rural areas, and enterprises.

== 2024 ==
Region	Areas visited	Dates	Details
Tianjin		1–2 February	Visited Tianjin before the Spring Festival.
Hunan	Changsha, Changde	18–21 March	Visited Hunan First Normal University.
Chongqing		22–24 April	Visited the Chongqing International Logistics Hub Park and the Minzhu Village community in Xiejiawan Subdistrict, as well as the Army Medical University.
Shandong	Rizhao, Jinan	22–24 May	Visited Rizhao Port, the Sunshine Coast Greenway, as well as PLA troops stationed in Jinan.
Qinghai	Xining	18–19 June	Visited schools and religious sites in Xining.
Ningxia	Yinchuan	19 June	Paid a trip to Ningxia.
Shaanxi	Baoji	10–13 September	Visited the Baoji Bronze Museum.
Gansu	Tianshui, Lanzhou	10–13 September	Visited the Fuxi Temple, the Nanshan Huaniu Apple Base in Maiji District, and the Maijishan Grottoes.
Fujian	Zhangzhou, Xiamen	15–16 October	Conducted inspections and research at rural areas, revolutionary education bases, cultural relics protection units, and free trade zones.
Anhui	Anqing, Hefei	17–18 October	Conducted inspections and research in historical and cultural blocks and science and technology innovation parks.
Hubei	Xiaogan, Xianning, Wuhan	4–6 November	Conducted inspections and research at museums, rural areas, and science and technology and industrial innovation platforms.
Macau		18–20 December	Visited for the 25th anniversary of Macau's handover to China.

== 2025 ==
Region	Areas visited	Dates	Details
Liaoning	Huludao, Shenyang, Benxi	22–24 January	Visited Liaoning before the Spring Festival.
Guizhou	Qiandongnan, Guiyang	17–18 March	Visited Zhaoxing Dong Village in Liping County, Qiandongnan. Also visited Guiyang, where he listened to the work report from the Guizhou Provincial Party Committee and the Provincial Government.
Yunnan	Lijiang, Kunming	19–20 March	Visited the Lijiang Modern Flower Industry Park and the Old Town of Lijiang. Also visited Kunming, where he listened to the work report from the Yunnan Provincial Party Committee and the Provincial Government.
Shanghai		29 April	Visited Xuhui District.
Henan	Luoyang, Zhengzhou	19–20 May	Visited the Luoyang Bearing Group. Also visited Zhengzhou, where he listened to the work report from the Henan Provincial Party Committee and the Provincial Government.
Shanxi	Yangquan, Taiyuan	7–8 July	Visited the Monument to the Hundred Regiments Offensive and Yangquan Valve Company in Yangquan. Also visited Taiyuan, where he listened to the work report from the Shanxi Provincial Party Committee and the Provincial Government.
Tibet	Lhasa	21 August	Visited for the 60th anniversary of the Tibet Autonomous Region
Tianjin		29 August–1 September	Hosted the 2025 Tianjin SCO summit, held bilateral meetings.
Xinjiang	Ürümqi	23 September	Visited for the 70th anniversary of the Xinjiang Uygur Autonomous Region
Hainan	Sanya	5–7 November	Attended the opening ceremony of the Chinese aircraft carrier Fujian.
Guangdong	Meizhou, Guangzhou	7–9 November	Visited the visiting the Ye Jianying Memorial Hall in Yanyang Town, Meixian District and the Nanfu Pomelo Plantation. Also visited Guangzhou, where he visited an exhibition and listened to the work report from the Guangdong Provincial Party Committee and the Provincial Government. Attended the opening ceremony of the 2025 National Games of China at Guangdong Olympic Stadium.
Sichuan	Chengdu	5 December	Had amicable talks with President Macron, visited Dujiangyan.

== 2026 ==
Region	Areas visited	Dates	Details
Hebei	Xiong'an	23–24 March	Visited the Xiong'an New Area.
Shandong	Dezhou	24 June	Inspection trip.
Inner Mongolia	Ulanqab	16 October	Inspection trip.
Guangdong	Zhongshan	16 November	Inspection trip.
