= Fujian Demonstration Zone =

Fujian Demonstration Zone 福建两岸融合示范区
- Demonstration Zone
- Fujian Demonstration Zone for Integrated Development across the Taiwan Strait
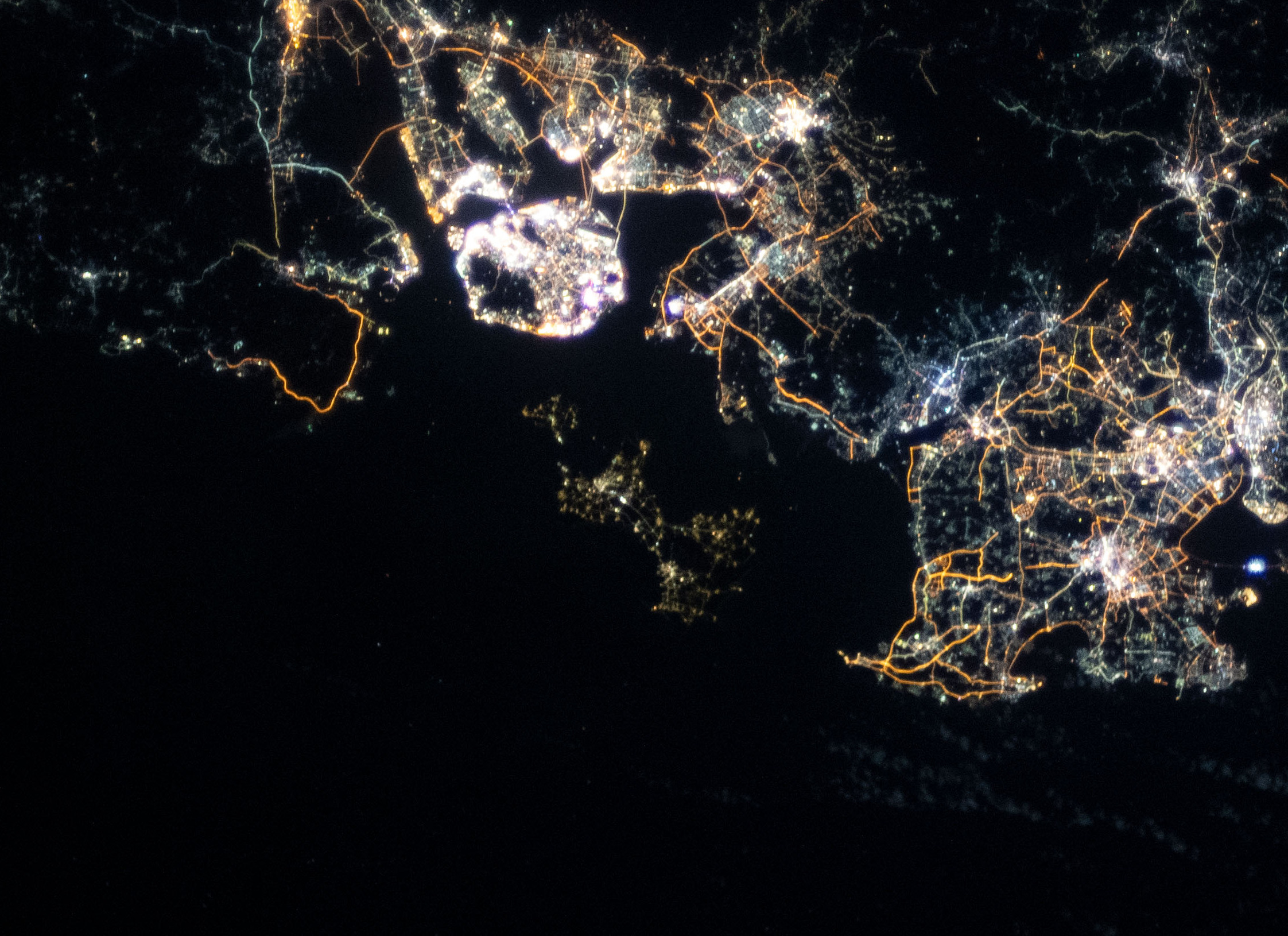
- Kinmen and the coastal cities of Zhangzhou, Xiamen and Quanzhou in Fujian Province
- Country: China
- Province: Fujian
- Time zone: UTC+8 (China Standard)

The Fujian Demonstration Zone, officially named the Fujian Demonstration Zone for Integrated Development across the Taiwan Strait, is a proposed plan by the People's Republic of China (PRC) to support the integration of Fujian and Taiwan.

The plan was first unveiled by Wang Huning, the chairman of the National Committee of the Chinese People's Political Consultative Conference, in June 2023 and was officially proposed jointly by the Central Committee of the Chinese Communist Party and the State Council of China in September 2023. It aims to connect Fuzhou and Xiamen in Fujian to Matsu and Kinmen, which are under the jurisdiction of the Republic of China, through transportation construction and economic and trade exchanges, with the goal of promoting Chinese unification.

== History ==
In 2009, Pingtan County was made a pilot zone for cross-strait integration. This included preferential policies in regard to customs, taxes, investment and land use. The plan for all of Fujian was first proposed by Wang Huning, the chairman of the National Committee of the Chinese People's Political Consultative Conference and a member of the Politburo Standing Committee of the Chinese Communist Party, at the Straits Forum in June 2023. Wang unveiled the plan to transform Fujian province into a showcase zone for "Taiwan's economic integration into China". The Mainland Affairs Council of Taiwan reacted unfavorably to the plan.

On 12 September 2023, the CCP Central Committee and the State Council officially unveiled a white paper titled "Opinions on Supporting Fujian in Exploring New Paths for Cross-Strait Integration and Development and Building a Cross-Strait Integration and Development Demonstration Zone", with 21 measures including making it easier for Taiwanese people to live, buy property, access social services and study in Fujian, as well as boost industrial cooperation. Under the new plan, Taiwanese people would no longer need to register for temporary residence in Fujian, and would be encouraged to buy property and take part in mainland China's social welfare system. It also proposes support for Taiwanese companies to employee more people from Taiwan and start a pilot project to allow Taiwanese to set up radio and television programme production companies in Fujian.

On 8 January 2024, the Ministry of Commerce, the National Development and Reform Commission, the Ministry of Industry and Information Technology and the Taiwan Affairs Office jointly published the "Notice on Several Measures to Support Fujian in Exploring New Paths for Cross-Strait Integration and Development in the Economic and Trade Field", proposing 14 measures in five areas for Fujian to "better leverage its unique relation with Taiwan". The proposals included supporting Taiwanese industrial trade businesses that want to invest in the Fujian Free-Trade Zone, faster customs clearance as well as mutual recognition of professional talent. It also supports building e-commerce comprehensive pilot zones in Fujian for the Taiwanese market and constructing a small commodity trading market in Fujian that would become a leading destination for small and medium enterprises in Taiwan. It specifically highlighted the integration of the Kinmen and Matsu islands, calling for the easing of tariffs, regulatory barriers and building cooperative development zones.

By 2025, several counties in Fujian established local Taiwan Affairs Offices as part of the plan; though it is common for province-level divisions in China to have a Taiwan Affairs Office, this is uncommon at the county level. Zhou Qingsong, the director of the Organization Department of the CCP Fujian Provincial Committee, also announced vocational schools would recruit Taiwanese teachers, universities and public schools in Fujian would make it easier for Taiwanese students to enroll. On 27 February 2025, Fujian announced 17 measures to develop closer relations with Taiwan, including creating 100 positions annually in Ningde over the next three years for Taiwanese to work in the lithium battery industry, providing incentives in Putian to support Taiwanese biopharmaceutical enterprises to establish operations in a designated industrial estate, giving incentives to industrial design companies to operate in Fujian, and enticing companies from Matsu Islands to operate in Fuzhou.
