= Three Musts =

Chinese Communist Party slogan

The Three Musts (Chinese: 三个务必) is a political slogan first proposed by Chinese Communist Party (CCP) general secretary Xi Jinping in October 2022.

== History ==
The term was first used by Chinese Communist Party (CCP) general secretary Xi Jinping on 16 October 2022 at his political report to the 20th CCP National Congress. At his speech, he said:

Our responsibility is unmatched in importance, and our mission is glorious beyond compare. It is imperative that all of us in the Party never forget our original aspiration and founding mission, that we always stay modest, prudent, and hard-working, and that we have the courage and ability to carry on our fight. We must remain confident in our history, exhibit greater historical initiative, and write an even more magnificent chapter for socialism with Chinese characteristics in the new era.

This phrase formed was later termed in Chinese media as the Three Musts. Usage of the phrase increased rapidly in October and November 2022. On 20 October 2022, official CCP historian Luo Pinghan told an explanatory piece by the China Newsweek that the concept was based on Mao Zedong's Two Musts, which was coined in 1949. On 7 November 2022, a People's Daily editorial with the pen name "Zhong Yin", likely used to represent the views of the central leadership, described the Three Musts as an essential guide for the CCP in solving challenges ahead.

== Content ==
The Three Musts mean that Chinese Communist Party members must:

1. "remain true to their original aspiration and keep their mission firmly in mind"
2. "be modest and prudent and work hard, must dare to struggle and be good at struggling"
3. "strengthen their historical confidence, enhance their historical initiative, and write a more magnificent chapter of socialism with Chinese characteristics in the new era"
