= Wang Huning =

Chinese politician (born 1955)

- 王沪宁
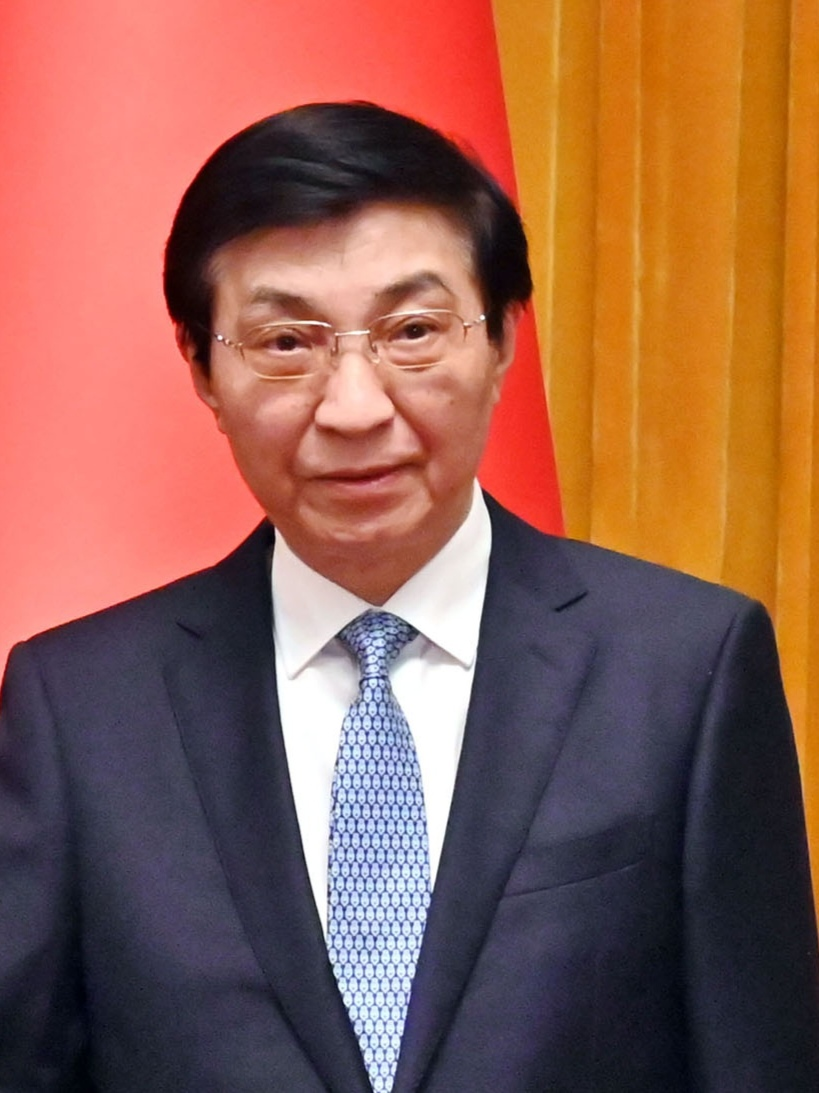
- Wang in 2024

10th Chairman of the National Committee of the Chinese People's Political Consultative Conference
- Incumbent
- Assumed office 10 March 2023
- Vice Chairpersons: See list: Shi Taifeng; Hu Chunhua; Shen Yueyue; Wang Yong; Zhou Qiang; Pagbalha Geleg Namgyai; Edmund Ho; Leung Chun-ying; Bagatur; Su Hui; Shao Hong; Gao Yunlong; Chen Wu; Mu Hong; Xian Hui; Wang Dongfeng; Jiang Xinzhi; Jiang Zuojun; He Baoxiang; Wang Guangqian; Qin Boyong; Zhu Yongxin; Yang Zhen
- Secretary-General: Wang Dongfeng
- Preceded by: Wang Yang

Director of the Central Policy Research Office
- In office October 2002 – October 2020
- Deputy: He Yiting; Zheng Xinli
- General Secretary: Jiang Zemin; Hu Jintao; Xi Jinping
- Preceded by: Teng Wensheng
- Succeeded by: Jiang Jinquan
Other office held
Director of the Office of the Central Comprehensively Deepening Reforms Commission
Incumbent
Assumed office 22 January 2014
| Deputy | Mu Hong; Pan Shengzhou; Chen Yixin |
| Preceded by | Office established |
Chairman of the Central Guidance Commission on Building Spiritual Civilization
In office 17 November 2017 – October 2022
| Deputy | Sun Chunlan; Huang Kunming |
| Preceded by | Liu Yunshan |
| Succeeded by | Office disestablished |

Personal details
- Born: 6 October 1955 (age 71) Shanghai, China
- Party: Chinese Communist Party (1984–present)
- Spouse: See list: Zhou Qi; Xiao Jialing
- Children: 1
- Education: Fudan University; East China Normal University
- Occupation: Associate professor

Academic work
- Discipline: International relations
- School or tradition: Neoauthoritarianism
- Institutions: Fudan University (1981–1988, 1989–1994); University of Iowa (1988); University of California, Berkeley (1988)
- Main interests: Chinese politics; comparative politics; political science; International relations; literature; political status of Taiwan; Revolutions of 1989
- Notable works: America Against America; Political Life
- Notable ideas: One country, two systems

Wang Huning (Chinese: 王沪宁; pinyin: Wáng Hùníng; born 6 October 1955) is a Chinese political scientist and politician who is one of the top leaders of the Chinese Communist Party (CCP). He is currently the chairman of the National Committee of the Chinese People's Political Consultative Conference (CPPCC). He has been a leading ideologist in the country since the 1980s. He has been a member of the CCP's Politburo Standing Committee, the highest decision-making body within the party between convocations of the Central Committee and the National Congress, since 2017 (19th).

A former academic, Wang was a professor of international politics and dean of the law school at Fudan University. During this time, he gained attention due to his belief in "neoauthoritarianism", which held that a strong leadership was needed for China's stability and political reforms. He became a policy author for the CCP leadership in 1995 as a director of a research team at the CCP's Central Policy Research Office (CPRO). He became the CPRO's deputy director in 1998, and became a member of the party's Central Committee and director of the office in 2002. He remained in the CPRO until 2020, the longest tenure in the office. As CPRO deputy director and later as director, he was instrumental in developing the Three Represents, a new ideological theory formulated under Jiang Zemin's leadership. He continued this work under Hu Jintao, and is believed to have had an important role in developing the theories, Scientific Outlook on Development, as well as Harmonious Society. He became a member of the CCP secretariat in 2007, a central leading organ responsible for executing and implementing policy decisions.

Wang became a member of the Politburo (18th) in 2012, and is believed to have developed close relations with CCP general secretary Xi Jinping, becoming one of his closer associates. In 2017, he was promoted to the 5th-ranked member of the Politburo Standing Committee and was elected to the Secretariat (19th). He has also chaired leading commissions on ideology and reforms and is believed to have been instrumental in developing key concepts under Xi, including Xi Jinping Thought, Chinese-style modernization, the Chinese Dream, and the Belt and Road Initiative. In 2022, he stopped serving in the Secretariat and became the 4th-ranking member of the PSC. He became the CPPCC chairman in March 2023, succeeding Wang Yang. He also became the deputy leader of the Central Leading Group for Taiwan Affairs, an internal policy coordination organization on Taiwan policy.

Widely regarded as the "Gray Eminence" of the CCP, Wang is perceived by external observers to be the informal chief ideologue of the CCP as well as the principal architect behind the party's political ideologies since the 1990s. He has held significant positions under three paramount leaders, a rare occurrence in Chinese politics. Wang believes that a strong, centralized state is needed in China to resist foreign influence, an idea that has been influential under Xi.

== Early life ==
Wang was born on 6 October 1955 in Nanshi, Shanghai. He traces his heritage to Ye County, Shandong province, though he never lived in Shandong. Wang's name, "Huning (沪宁)", literally means "the peace (宁) of Shanghai (沪)", a typical name given by his Red Army parents, who fought in the Shanghai Campaign of the Chinese Civil War and remained in the city thereafter. As a military official, Wang Huning's father was implicated during the anti–Peng Dehuai campaign launched by Mao Zedong and suffered persecution during the Cultural Revolution. His mother was hospitalized several times due to illness after 1965, requiring Wang and his two older brothers to look after her. In order to prevent his three sons from dawdling amidst the Cultural Revolution, his father locked them inside their home and required them to either copy the manuscript of the Selected Works of Mao Tse-Tung or read books. This experience fostered Wang's calm personality.

During his youth, Wang went to the Shanghai Yongqiang Middle School, where he obtained books that were forbidden from his teachers. After the school opened a mechanic class, Wang participated in it as an apprentice worker. He graduated from this junior high school in 1972. After Nixon's visit to China, the Chinese Communist Party (CCP) found itself lacking diplomats familiar with foreign languages. Following an order by the CCP Central Committee, the Shanghai Revolutionary Committee established the Foreign Language Training Class in the Fudan University, the Shanghai Normal University (Note: Between 1972 and 1980, the East China Normal University was renamed as the Shanghai Normal University, and is different from the current Shanghai Normal University.) and the Shanghai International Studies College, with each university being required to enroll 200 students in the first enrollment year of 1977. Wang was recommended to enter Shanghai Normal University 7 May Cadre School's Foreign Language Training Class to study French with 24 other classmates. (Note: There are arguments on when Wang was admitted to the training class. Normally it took three years to graduate for undergraduate-level education in China during the Cultural Revolution. Official records by East China Normal University suggest that Wang entered the School in 1977, which is widely believed to be true. According to Wang himself, he remained in the countryside for four and a half years in his book Culture of Contemporary Chinese Village Family.) The Training Class was first located in Dafeng County, Jiangsu Province, where Wang began his study in October 1972. The 7 May Cadre School later moved to Fengxian, Shanghai in April 1973.

After his graduation in February 1977, (Note: The training school did not offer a degree for graduates. On 13 July 1982, after countless petitions for certificates, the Shanghai Higher Education Bureau issued notice that all training school graduates who participated and passed an exam which consisted of political theory, Chinese literature and foreign languages would be granted a junior college (大专) degree.) he became a cadre at the Shanghai Publishing Bureau. In 1978, he participated in the Graduate Entrance Examination and was admitted as a postgraduate student in the Department of International Politics of Fudan University. His mentor was Chen Qiren, who later recalled Wang was late during the interview for the entrance examination, but he gave Wang a pass due to his excellence in the primary exam. Wang's Master dissertation was "From Bodin to Maritain: A review on the development of the Western sovereignty theory". The thesis was highly approved by the defense committee, which called it "a preliminary attempt by the Chinese academic circles to systematically study bourgeois sovereignty theory". He received a Master of Laws degree (Note: In the Chinese academic system, law is a much broader sector includes law (legal studies), political science, international relations and Marxist theory.) in 1981 and stayed in Fudan as an instructor at the Political Science Teaching and Research Department. During this time, he established a close relationship with department director Wang Bangzuo. They were usually referred to as "the two Wang" by their counterparts. According to Radio Free Asia, the theoretical framework for the "one country, two systems" principle for Hong Kong was first developed by Wang Huning and Wang Bangzuo in an unpublished article in the early 1980s.

== Academic career ==
In April 1984, Wang joined the Party. In 1985 at age 29, without first needing to serve as lecturer, Wang was promoted to associate professor in international politics, making him China's youngest associate professor at the time. This made him a national figure in China. Young people wrote to him for guidance and asked him to help compile bibliographies, while his superiors often asked him to give reports and talk about his experiences. Regarding his fame Wang told an interview in 1986: "What I want most now is a peaceful and quiet environment, otherwise I will be very depressed. I have to prepare to teach new courses, I am writing two monographs, and I have my own plans. All of these take time." As a teacher, Wang continuously introduced new courses, usually teaching two or three courses per semester, and sometimes teaching four courses at the same time.

During this time he published widely in academic journals, newspapers and magazines, which were read by the intellectual elite. By the end of 1985, Wang had published nearly 80 articles and compiled 700,000 words of materials. He also translated Robert Dahl's Modern Political Analysis. He was also selected as a special policy researcher by Organization Department of the Shanghai Municipal Party Committee, which controls staffing positions within the Municipal Committee, and was the main contributor to the book Introduction to Political Science, a key social sciences project during the sixth five-year plan.

In May 1987, he published the book Comparative Political Analysis, in which he proposed the concept "historical-social-cultural analytical framework". In 1988, Wang was a visiting scholar in the United States for six months, spending the first three months at the University of Iowa, three weeks at the University of California, Berkeley, and visiting many other universities. During his time in the United States, Wang visited over 30 cities and close to 20 universities, and later wrote about his experiences in his book America Against America. After returning to China, Wang served as director of Fudan University's Department of International Politics from 1989 to 1994, and as dean of the law school in 1994–95.

Wang has been a well-known scholar in academic circles since the 1980s. He wrote columns and essays for literary magazines such as Dushu and World Economic Herald as well as numerous party-sanctioned publications including Wenhui Bao, Jiefang Daily and Guangming Daily. He was featured on the cover of current affairs magazines such as Banyuetan, attracting the attention of Shanghai's top political leaders, and he was known by Jiang Zemin, then Party secretary of Shanghai. His achievements led to him being selected to participate in the drafting of theoretical documents for the CCP beginning from the 13th CCP National Congress in 1987. In 1993, Wang led the Fudan student debate team to participate in a Chinese-language international college debate competition in Singapore. The team won the championship between 1988 and 1993, greatly enhancing Wang's reputation.

On 12 February 1993, Wang established the Fudan University Development Research Institute. During this time, Wang participated in bimonthly seminars organized first by Shanghai mayor Jiang Zemin. The Development Research Institute submitted various reports, including on the 1989 revolutions in the Eastern Bloc and the political status of Taiwan. Wang was one of the two chief planners, of the China Development Report published by the Development Research Institute at the end of 1993; he was also the chief writer of its political section. Wang's work in the 1990s expressed the position that China should reclaim a sense of Chinese cultural and intellectual autonomy. This drew increased attention from high-standing state-party political leaders. In 1994, he wrote a diary titled Political Life, in which he talked about his daily life and thoughts on political and non-political issues.

== Political career ==
In the summer of 1994, he participated in the drafting of the documents for the 4th plenary session of the 14th Central Committee. During his academic career, Wang was noticed by top Shanghai politicians Zeng Qinghong, the director of the General Office of the CCP Central Committee, and Wu Bangguo, the Party Secretary of Shanghai, both of whom were politically close with General Secretary Jiang Zemin. While in Shanghai, Wu considered asking Wang to be a political researcher, an idea he mentioned to Jiang several times after starting to work in Beijing as a Vice Premier. When Jiang and Wang first met, Jiang joked "If you don’t come to Beijing again, these people will fall out with me", referring to Zeng and Wu. Jiang, who had heard a lot about Wang and read his works, quoted arguments from Wang's works, pleasantly surprising Wang.

In April 1995, Wang was appointed by Jiang to become the head the political research team at the Central Policy Research Office (CPRO) in Beijing. After being appointed, Wang's first task was drafting the documents for the 5th plenary session for the 15th Central Committee. For the report, Wang wrote about the Twelve Major Relationships, which elaborated on how the CCP will handle the relationship between reform, development, stability and so on. He was often considered to be a key political theorist serving in the Jiang Zemin administration, together with CPRO director Teng Wensheng and Liu Ji. He was promoted in April 1998 to be the deputy director of the CPRO, and accompanied Jiang on foreign visits since 1998 as a special assistant to the president. He was also part of a team that formulated "Three Represents" that allowed entrepreneurs to join the CCP and which was written into the CCP constitution in 2002.

In 2002, he was elected by the 16th Party National Congress as a member of the 16th CCP Central Committee, becoming a political functionary. He also succeeded Teng to be the director of the CPRO. In November 2007, Wang was elected to the Secretariat of the Chinese Communist Party (17th). He began accompanying General Secretary Hu Jintao on foreign trips and was considered one of Hu's three most influential secretaries, along with Ling Jihua and Chen Shiju. Wang is considered to be influential in the development of Scientific Outlook on Development and Harmonious Society, two concepts that originated under Hu's leadership. During this time, he also started working together with Xi Jinping; Wang was a member of the Central Leading Group for Party Building, which Xi started chairing in 2007. Wang led the team that wrote Hu's final report at the 18th CCP National Congress. According to Radio Free Asia, Wang proposed twice to the Central Committee about stepping down as the CPRO Director after becoming a member of the Secretariat, but continued serving in the role after the CCP Organization Department could not find anyone to succeed him.

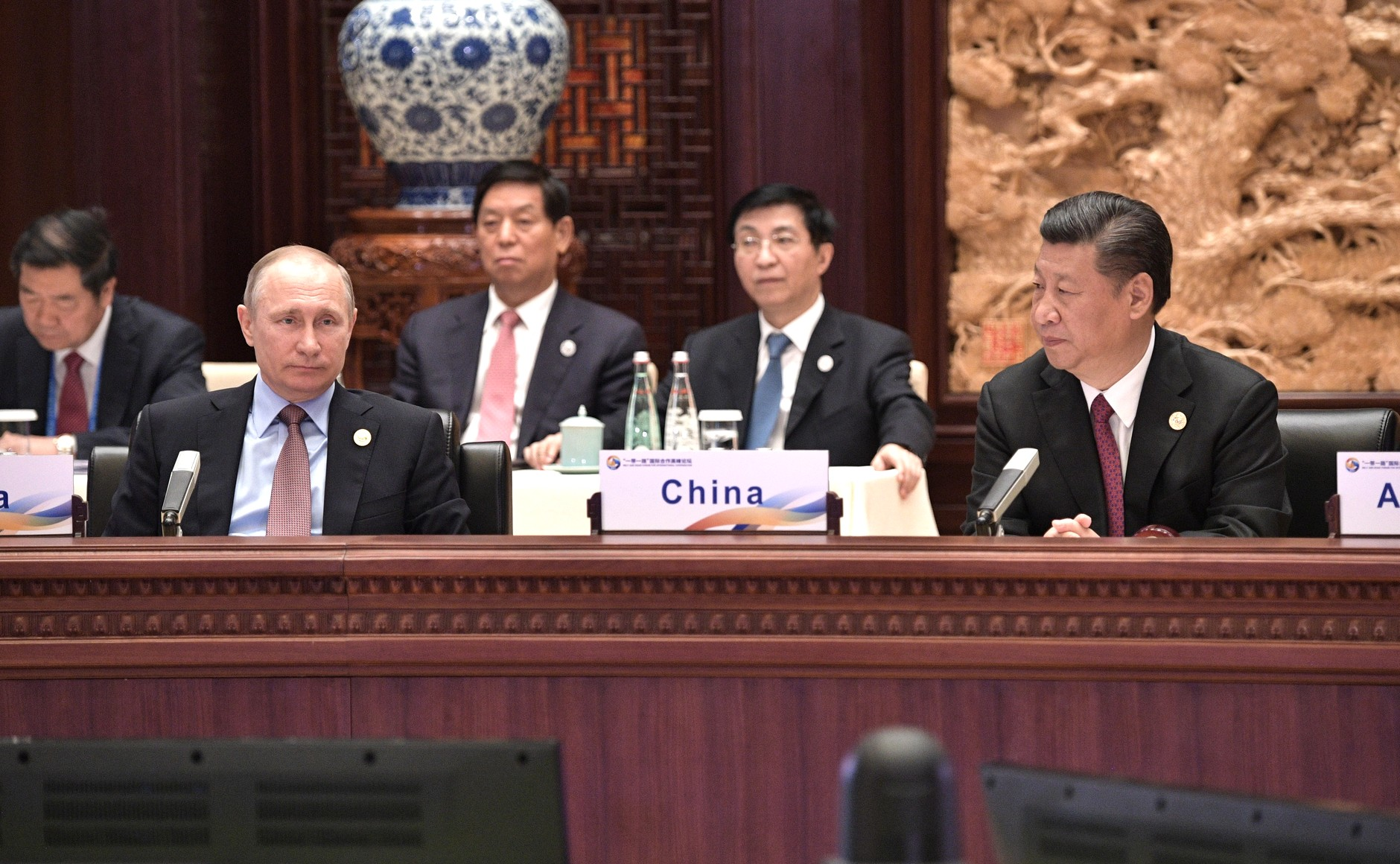
On 14 May 2017, Xi Jinping and Russian president Vladimir Putin attended the Belt and Road Forum for International Cooperation. Behind them were Wang, Li Zhanshu and He Lifeng.

He was elected to the Politburo of the Chinese Communist Party in November 2012 by the 18th Central Committee, becoming the first director of the CPRO to hold a seat on the Politburo. He also stopped serving in the CCP Secretariat. Wang worked closely with Xi Jinping after he was elected as the general secretary in November 2012, emerging as one of the central members of Xi's delegation on international trips. On 22 January 2014, Wang was appointed as the director of the Office of the Central Comprehensively Deepening Reforms Commission (CCDR), a new CCP body responsible for implementing domestic economic, political, cultural and social reforms. In April 2015, he became the deputy head of the newly created Belt and Road Construction Leadership Group, a coordination group to oversee the Belt and Road Initiative.

=== 19th Secretariat (2017–2022) ===
Wang was elected by the 1st plenary session of the 19th Central Committee to be the 5th-ranking member of the Politburo Standing Committee on 25 October 2017, becoming one of the few members of the body without prior ministerial or provincial experience. He became a member of the 19th Secretariat. He was also appointed as a deputy leader of the CCDR. Wang has frequently accompanied Xi in his trips, suggesting involvement in China's diplomacy. In September 2017, Wang became a deputy leader of a leading group headed by National People's Congress Standing Committee chairman Zhang Dejiang, which drafted the 2018 constitutional amendment. In May 2018, Wang presided over the conference to commemorate the 200th birth anniversary of Karl Marx. In August 2018, Wang chaired the National Conference on Publicity and Ideological Work, where Xi delivered a keynote speech. Along with other leading cadre, Wang presided over the development of Xuexi Qiangguo, an app designed to teach Xi Jinping Thought. After the CCP launched the "remain true to our original aspiration and keep our mission firmly in mind" educational campaign in May 2019, Wang was appointed as the head of the Central Leading Group.

In January 2020, Wang became the deputy leader of the Central Leading Group for Responding to the COVID-19 Pandemic, with premier Li Keqiang as the leader. He also accompanied Xi to visiting Wuhan in March. Wang was succeeded by Jiang Jinquan as the director of CPRO in 2020. In 2020, he was one of the drafters of the outline of the fourteenth five-year plan. In February 2021, he gave a speech at a symposium commemorating the 100th birth anniversary of Hua Guofeng. He played a key role in drafting the "third historical resolution" in November 2021, which further consolidated Xi's power. In January 2022, Wang chaired the National Conference of Publicity Ministers, where he emphasized the importance of Xi Jinping Thought and called on officials to follow the "442 formula", meaning the Four Consciousnesses, the Four Confidences and the Two Upholds. Wang served as the secretary-general of the 20th CCP National Congress and briefed the Party Central Committee on the proposed Party Constitution amendments. Reuters reported on 3 March 2023, citing sources, that Wang held a meeting in late October with top medical experts, senior officials and people from the propaganda apparatus, asking them how many deaths an abandonment of zero-COVID controls would cause in a worst-case scenario and requesting them to devise roadmaps on reopening policies in different paces.

=== Chairman of the CPPCC National Committee (2023–) ===
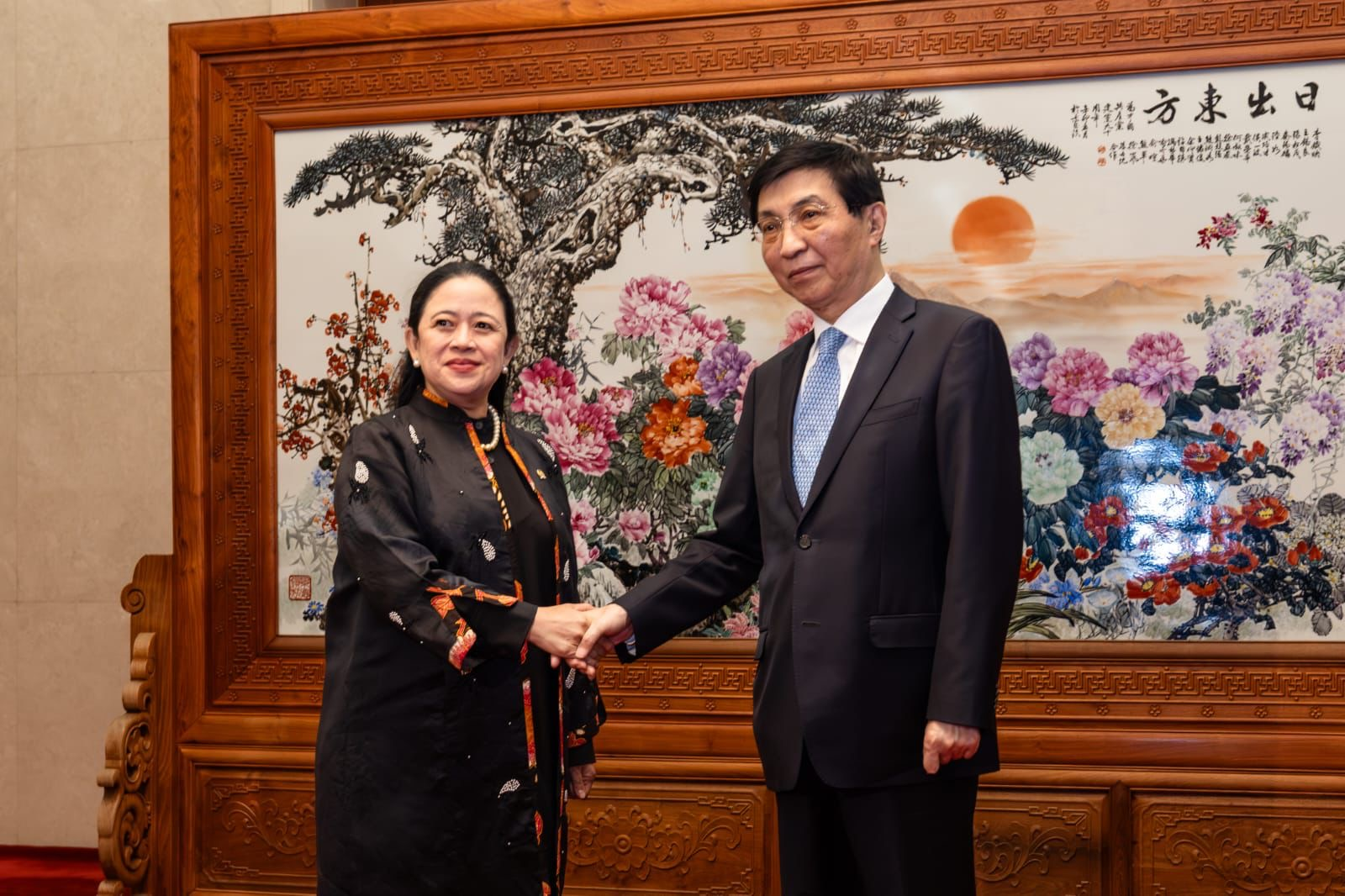
Wang Huning and Indonesian Speaker of the House of Representatives Puan Maharani on 28 May 2024

In a preparatory meeting, Wang was elected as the secretary-general of the 20th CCP National Congress, which was held in October 2022. He was also one of the deputy directors of the drafting team helping draft Xi's speech for the National Congress. Following the 1st plenary session of the 20th CCP Central Committee, Wang was elected to the Politburo Standing Committee of the Chinese Communist Party as its 4th ranking member, and stopped serving in the secretariat. On 17 January 2023, he was elected as a member of the 14th National Committee of the Chinese People's Political Consultative Conference (CPPCC), China's national specialist consultative organ. Though initial reporting before the CCP Congress by the South China Morning Post suggested that he was going to become the chairman of the Standing Committee of the National People's Congress, he instead became the chairman of the CPPCC National Committee in March 2023 at the 1st Session of the 14th CPPCC National Committee. He also kept his position as the deputy leader of the CCDR. According to a Foreign Affairs article by Odd Arne Westad in 2023, Wang is also a member of the CCP National Security Commission and "is perhaps the most influential presence after Xi himself."

In May 2023, Wang visited Xinjiang, including major cities such as Ürümqi and Kashgar as well as rural communities, schools, mosques and businesses. In Ürümqi, he visited the Xinjiang Islamic Institute, the Xinjiang University and some companies, while in Kashgar, he visited the Id Kah Mosque and the Mangan village. During the visit, he called for unity among ethnic groups and called on to "plant the seeds of patriotism into everyone, especially the teenagers". During a work conference on Xinjiang in September 2023, Wang called for efforts to develop industrial, education and cultural sectors of Xinjiang, and also stressed the importance of "pairing assistance" programs. He also called for "fostering a strong sense of community of the Chinese nation". In December 2023, Wang spoke at the 11th National Chinese Christian Congress, where he called on the Three-Self Patriotic Movement and the China Christian Council to "adhere to the direction of Sinicization of Christianity" and "interpret the doctrines that conform to the development and progress requirements of contemporary China, the core values of socialism and the excellent traditional Chinese culture".

In 2024, he was a deputy head to the Xi-led drafting committee that wrote the resolutions of the third plenary session of the 20th Central Committee in July 2024. At a plenary meeting of the CPPCC in July 2024, Wang called for boosting the dual circulation strategy. In December 2024, he visited the China Tibetology Research Center in Beijing. In January 2025, Wang held a meeting of the CPPCC, where he pledged to support the development of the private sector, saying China "must support the healthy development of the non-public sector and entrepreneurs, and also guide private enterprises and entrepreneurs to strengthen confidence, surmount challenges, and propel growth". In February 2025, he presided over a symposium attended by Xi and private sector leaders including Alibaba Group founder Jack Ma, Huawei founder Ren Zhengfei, Unitree Robotics founder Wang Xingxing, Will Semiconductor leader Yu Renrong, CATL leader Robin Zeng, Meituan leader Wang Xing, BYD Company leader Wang Chuanfu, Tencent CEO Ma Huateng and DeepSeek founder Liang Wenfeng. In March 2025, Wang held discussions with religious leaders in the CPPCC, where he called on religious activities to be "legal, safe, and orderly."

In July 2025, Wang told a CPPCC meeting that non-CCP groups, including members of the eight minor political parties, industry and commerce representatives, and public figures without party affiliation, to contribute to the debate about increasing consumption, which he called a long-term and healthy goal. In August 2025, Wang joined Xi in attending the 60th anniversary of the Tibet Autonomous Region, where he gave a speech praising the CCP's leadership in the region. In September 2025, Wang joined Xi in attending the 70th anniversary of the Xinjiang Uygur Autonomous Region, where he gave a speech praising CCP policies regarding Xinjiang. In November 2025, Wang met with German Vice Chancellor Lars Klingbeil. In the same month, he declared the 2025 National Games of China officially closed and visited the Shenzhen Municipal Party Committee. In December 2025, Wang visited Laos to attended celebrations for the 50th anniversary of the Lao People's Democratic Republic, where he met with Lao People's Revolutionary Party General Secretary and President Thongloun Sisoulith. He also visited Indonesia, where he met with Indonesian President Prabowo Subianto and Speaker of the House of Representatives Puan Maharani. In the same month, he met members of the Buddhist Association of China, calling on them to "listen to the Party and follow the Party".

Wang was part of the drafting team led by Xi that drafted the resolution adopted in October 2026 by the fifth plenary session of the 20th Central Committee; the team began its work in February 2026. In June 2026, Wang held a meeting on spurring demand for the domestic market. In July 2026, he visited North Korea to mark the 65th anniversary of the Treaty on Friendship, Cooperation and Mutual Assistance between China and North Korea, where he met with Workers' Party of Korea Organization and Guidance Department director Jo Yong-won and visited the Sino-Korean Friendship Tower, where he paid respects to Chinese volunteer soldiers who died in the Korean War. Wang also met with North Korean leader Kim Jong Un, and visited the Kumsusan Palace of the Sun, the People’s Volunteer Army Martyrs’ Cemetery, the Central Cadres Training School, and the Wonsan Kalma Coastal Tourist Area. In the same month, he visited the Tibet Autonomous Region's Lhasa and Ngari Prefecture, where he called on for the implementation of the Law on Promoting Ethnic Unity and Progress and called on efforts "to continuously guide Tibetan Buddhism to adapt to socialist society in line with the requirement to ... systematically promote the Sinicisation of religion in China". In October 2026, Wang visited Dandong, where he met with North Korean leader Kim Jong Un at the Memorial of the War to Resist US Aggression and Aid Korea to commemorate the 76th anniversary of China's entry to the Korean War. They also visited the Huanghai Bus factory in Dandong, and Kim returned to North Korea afterwards through the New Yalu River Bridge.

==== Taiwan ====
In January 2023, Wang became the deputy leader of the Central Leading Group for Taiwan Affairs, placing him in charge of political relations with Taiwan. In this capacity, he has been tasked with advancing the united front in Taiwan. He is tasked with laying the groundwork for unification with Taiwan, coming up with a theory that replaces "one country, two systems" to serve as a metric to measure progress toward China's unification goals. On 10 February, Wang met with Andrew Hsia, vice chairman of the Kuomintang, Taiwan's main opposition party. During the visit, Wang said that "Taiwan independence is incompatible with peace and runs counter to the well-being of Taiwan compatriots". In May, Wang spoke at the Taiwan Work Conference, where he mentioned the Party’s Comprehensive Plan for Resolving the Taiwan Problem in the New Era and asserted adherence to the 1992 Consensus as any prerequisite for cross-strait talks; the speech noticeably did not mention "one country, two systems".

In June, Wang met with Liu Chao-shiuan, president of the Council of the Summit for Entrepreneurs Across the Taiwan Strait, in April, and Wu Cherng-dean, chairman of the New Party. In the same month, at the Straits Forum Wang unveiled a plan to transform Fujian province into a demonstration zone for "Taiwan’s economic integration into China". Taiwan's government rejected this proposal. On 11 September, he was chosen as the president of the China Council for the Promotion of Peaceful National Reunification, a body designed to advance unification with Taiwan; the CPPCC chairman also generally serves as the president of the council. In October, he presided over the 6th Taiwan Compatriots Social Organizations Forum, whose approximately 300 people attendance was drawn from the United Front Work Department’s Taiwan-oriented united front organizations. In November, he presided over the 10th anniversary meeting of the Cross-Strait Entrepreneurs Summit in Nanjing, where he read a congratulatory letter from Xi and encouraged Taiwanese enterpreneurs to invest in mainland China. In December 2023, Taiwanese officials told reporters Wang convened a meeting to coordinate efforts across various departments to influence the 2024 Taiwanese presidential election.

In February 2024, Wang spoke at the Taiwan Work Conference, where he said China "must resolutely fight ‘Taiwan independence’ separatism" and "further grasp the strategic initiative to achieve the complete unification of the motherland". On 10 April, he was one of the officials that met former Taiwanese President Ma Ying-jeou during his meeting with Xi. On 27 April, he met with a Kuomintang delegation led by Fu Kun-chi, the Majority Leader in the Legislative Yuan, Taiwan's legislature, in Beijing. He attended the Straits Forum in June 2024, where he said the "historic trend of China’s renaissance and reunification is unstoppable". In August, he sent a congratulatory to the Overseas Chinese World Conference for Promoting Peaceful Reunification of China held in Hong Kong, praising the efforts of Chinese in Hong Kong, Macau, Taiwan and overseas in advocating against Taiwanese independence. In February 2025, he attended a work conference on Taiwan affairs, where he called on China to "shape the inevitable reunification of the motherland". In June 2025, he attended the Straits Forum, where he again met with Ma Ying-jeou. In October 2025, Wang attended an event to mark the newly established Commemoration Day of Taiwan's Restoration.

In February 2026, he met with Kuomintang vice chairman Hsiao Hsu-tsen, where he said that the CCP was willing to strengthen exchanges with Taiwan's political parties and civil groups on the basis of the 1992 Consensus and opposition to Taiwan independence, and advocated for the principle that "people on both sides of the Taiwan Strait are all of the same family". In the same month, Wang addressed the annual Taiwan Work Conference, where he said it is necessary to "firmly support the patriotic pro-unification forces on the island, resolutely strike against 'Taiwan independence' separatist forces, oppose interference by external forces, and safeguard peace and stability in the Taiwan Strait". In April, Wang accompanied Xi during his meeting with Kuomintang chairwoman Cheng Li-wun. On 10 May, he met with Kuomintang vice chairman Chang Jung-kung, where he called on further cooperation on the basis of the Xi–Cheng meeting. In June 2026, he addressed the annual Straits Forum, where he said "This year’s Straits Forum was held in a grand manner, with many Taiwan compatriots overcoming obstacles to participate enthusiastically"; the Democratic Progressive Party government in Taiwan had forbidden local officials attending the event.

== Political positions ==
Wang has been called China's "chief ideologue" by external observers and is thought to be influential in the development of the political ideas published under the names of three CCP leaders: Three Represents of Jiang Zemin, the Scientific Outlook on Development of Hu Jintao, and Xi Jinping Thought. He is also believed to play a key role in drafting concepts including the Harmonious Society, Chinese Dream, Chinese-style modernization, and the Belt and Road Initiative. According to the South China Morning Post, Xi "regularly asks for Wang’s input on his major speeches and statements".

=== Political system ===
During his tenure as a professor in the 1980s, Wang initially gained attention for his advocacy of neoauthoritarianism, the view that a centralized government is necessary to maintain economic growth and stability, which could later slowly do political reforms from within, though Wang has rejected the label, saying "the Communist Party can only accept one doctrine, Marxism–Leninism". While in Fudan, Wang took an interest in the economic development of the Four Asian Tigers, particularly of Singapore. After the 1989 Tiananmen Square protests and massacre and the dissolution of the Soviet Union, Wang, along with other academics that favored neoauthoritarianism, proposed a new set of ideas which came to be called "neoconservatism", which rejected radical reform in favor of market reforms and upholding the leadership of the CCP.

In his articles, Wang wrote "political systems must adapt to certain historical, social and cultural conditions" and "cannot be transplanted or forced to grow". In regard to democracy in China, he wrote "the reform of the political system cannot exceed the specific conditions of China at this stage", continuing by saying "developing democracy should be based on the development of productivity. Only in this way can the development of democracy be effective". Wang wrote that he believes there must be a unified and stable leadership to "promote democracy in the whole society through inner-party democracy". During the period of reform and opening up in the 1980s, Wang wrote that "China’s political culture is undergoing a profound transformation; the traditional, conservative, closed, concentrated, subjective, and arbitrary elements of political culture are transforming into new, open, decentralized, objective, and democratic elements".

In a paper titled "Reflections on the ‘Cultural Revolution’ and Political Reform" published in 1986 in the World Economic Herald, he wrote that it is "very important to comply with the constitution" lest a new Cultural Revolution happen. He also wrote "Aside from historical, social, economic and other causes, the imperfect and incomplete nature of political reforms were a cause that cannot be underestimated". He wrote the Cultural Revolution occurred because the CCP had not "formed a complete set of democratic systems" including a "system of division" between the Party and government, the National People's Congress was unable to exercise its powers, and there was no independent judicial system, a vertical decentralization in the political system, a national public servant system or a system to protect the right of citizens. As a solution, Wang proposes the CCP use "political projects" to create a further fusion of social and political life and to strengthen the CCP technologically.

In 1986, Wang wrote an article in which he argued that central power must be concentrated in the reform process and that the government should be relied upon to advance further economic reform. The article caused a debate in the Shanghai intellectual community, which debated the role of government centralization in the process of national modernization, and was seen as the theoretical embryo of neoauthoritarianism. His political views changed after his visit to the U.S., after which he advocated for a centralized one-party state that was culturally unified and self-confident to resist the influence of liberal ideas. In a 1995 interview, he said that "[i]n a place without central authority, or a place where central authority has become weakened, the country would be mired in a state of division and chaos," and that "[a] strong central authority is the fundamental guarantee for achieving rapid and stable development at a relatively low cost during the process of modernization."

=== Culture ===
In his 1988 essay "The Structure of China's Changing Political Culture", Wang said that the CCP must reconsider how a nation's "software", meaning culture, values, and attitudes, shaped its "hardware", meaning economics, systems, and institutions. Some sources have attributed this type of thought to be "a daring break from the materialism of Orthodox Marxism." Wang said that China was under a great transformation from a "culturally oriented political culture" guided by political mobilization to an "institutionally oriented political economy" led by economic mobilization, but the new model under the socialism with Chinese characteristics was leaving China with no core values, which "could serve only to dissolve societal and political cohesion". He says China passed through three stages in its development culture— traditional, modern, and Marxist-socialist— but none of them led to the removal of structures preceding them, meaning China was still an "unformed state" that did not have a "proper identity". Wang also said that the introduction of Marxism to China was not completely positive, and that while the CCP criticized China's historical values since 1949, it did not give enough regard to creating and shaping its own core values.

In the essay, he recommends that China combine and "re-engineer" its historical and modern values (including foreign Marxist values) to create a "synchronic" culture. He implies that as the Chinese population becomes more aware of the political socialization process, it will lead to the emergence of a new value system. He says China's political development will be the "fundamental basis for the construction of democratic politics in China" and "an important condition for the socialist system to demonstrate its superiority". He says there is a necessity for "the components of the modern structure that embody the spirit of modern democracy and humanism" to "take root and grow" and says "in the specific context of China's reform and opening, China's political culture needs to add elements in the areas of participation, democracy, consultation, equality, rights, responsibility, competition, and the rule of law."

Wang has also written China's first academic paper on "soft power", and has been thought to be the driving force in China's investments in promoting its culture overseas. In 1994, in his essay titled "Cultural Expansion and Cultural Sovereignty: A Challenge to the Concept of Sovereignty", Wang argued that after the end of the Cold War, "culture conflict" surpassed political and military conflicts as the greatest threats to state sovereignty. He wrote that "hard power" conflicts have been reduced and replaced by "soft power", including one that is "counter-hegemonic", with non-Western countries against Western "cultural hegemony", as well as the rise of nationalism between or within countries. He writes "Western countries are increasingly employing their cultural strength to constrain or influence world affairs and the process of internal developments of developing countries". He writes that as a reaction, "cultural sovereignty" emerged. He says struggle over culture is a form of "political struggle", meaning it was necessary to defend China's political system. He writes that while China must protect its cultural sovereignty, he says this must not mean an adoption of "cultural isolation", which he says "inevitably becomes archaic and obsolete".

=== United States ===
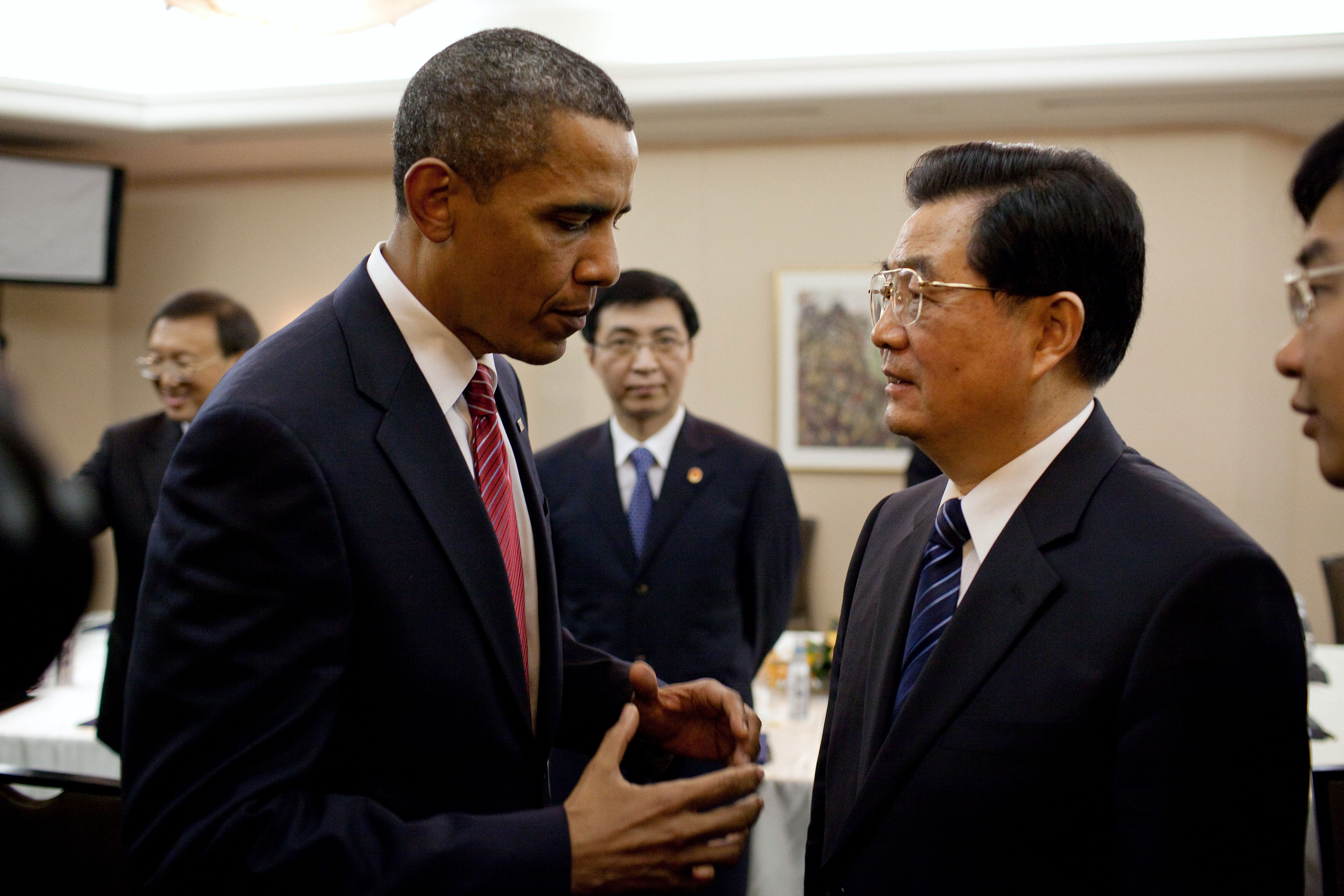
On 26 June 2010, Chinese leader Hu Jintao talked with U.S. President Barack Obama at the G20 Toronto Summit. Behind them was Wang Huning.

In 1991, after his visit to the U.S., Wang wrote the book America Against America. The book talked about the increasing challenges he saw in the U.S., such as inequality, economic conflicts, decaying of social values and commodification. He also praised the strengths of the U.S., such as its modernity and was described by The Economist as "seeing the weaknesses in America's system, but not exaggerating them". In Wang's own words:

My intention with this title is to show that America contains contradictions that cannot be dismissed with a single sentence. In the old days, people had a dogmatic view of American society as merely the "exploitation of surplus value," a "dictatorship of the bourgeoisie," and nothing more. Now there is another extreme, some people imagine the United States as a paradise, rich and without flaw. In fact American society doesn’t match either of these descriptions, and often finds itself in fundamental contradiction with them. There are strengths and weaknesses, and wherever strength can be found, weakness can also be found. America is a contradiction, it contains multitudes. This is what I mean by "America Against America."

== Personal life ==
Wang has been described by former colleagues as an insomniac and workaholic, introverted, discreet and "almost obsessively low-profile." After entering politics in the 1990s, he cut off most contacts with his academic colleagues. Having studied French as an undergraduate, Wang is a fluent French speaker. He is also an avid reader of Wuxia novels. In his memoir Political Life, Wang said his goal in life was to keep writing books and teaching students.

=== Family ===
Wang has two older brothers. Wang's first marriage, to Zhou Qi, an international relations expert at the Chinese Academy of Social Sciences and Renmin University of China, ended in divorce after he went to Zhongnanhai in 1996. They had no children. He later married a nurse in Zhongnanhai. They have one child.

=== Public perceptions ===
Having served under three consecutive paramount leaders, Wang demonstrated a notable ability to retain influence across different Communist Party factions. He has been regarded as the "Gray Eminence" of the CCP. He has also been described as "China's Kissinger" by The Hankyoreh, and is referred to by Chinese netizens as guóshī (国师)—a title historically reserved for senior religious advisers in Imperial China.

== Works ==
Wang's books include The Logic of Politics—The Principles of Marxist Political Science, General Introduction to New Politics, Analysis of Modern Western Politics, Analysis of Comparative Politics and Debate Contest in Lion City, all in Chinese. Others include (all in Chinese):

- ——— (1987). National Sovereignty.
- ——— (1987). Analysis of Comparative Politics.
- ——— (1988). Analysis of Contemporary Western Politics.
- ——— (1988). Introduction to Public Administration.
- ——— (1989). Analysis of Administrative Ecology.
- ——— (1989). Collection of Wang Huning.
- ——— (1990). Anti-Corruption: Experiment in China.
- ——— (1990). Corruption and Anti-Corruption: Study of Contemporary Oversees Corruption Problem.
- ——— (1991). Culture of Contemporary Chinese Village Family.
- ——— (1991). America Against America.
- ——— (1993). Debate in Lion Castle.
- ——— (1994). Political Logic.
- ——— (1995). Political Life.

=== Translations ===
- --, Wang Huning, "Reflections on the Cultural Revolution and the Reform of China's Political System, " (Translated from 王沪宁, "'文革'反思与政治体制改革," originally published in the World Economic Herard 世界经济导报 8 May 1986), Introduction by Matthew D. Johnson and Translation by David Ownby, Reading the China Dream

== See also ==
- Community of Common Destiny

== Notes ==
Party political offices
| Preceded by Teng Wensheng | Director of the Central Policy Research Office; 2002–2020 | Succeeded by Jiang Jinquan |
| Preceded by Liu Yunshan | Chairman of the Central Guidance Commission on Building Spiritual Civilization; 2017–2022 | Succeeded by Cai Qi |
Political offices
| Preceded by Wang Yang | Chairman of the National Committee of the Chinese People's Political Consultative Conference; 2023–present | Incumbent |
Order of precedence
| Preceded by Zhao Leji as Chairman of the Standing Committee of the National People's Congress | Order of precedence of China as Chairman of the National Committee of the Chinese People's Political Consultative Conference | Succeeded by Cai Qi as Member of the Politburo Standing Committee of the Chinese Communist Party |
