= Shayne's Emporium =

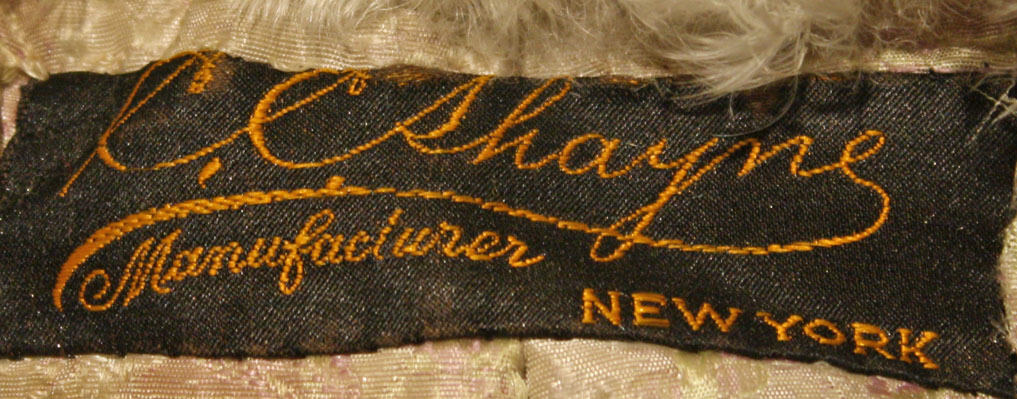
Cloth label "C. C. Shayne Manufacturer New York"

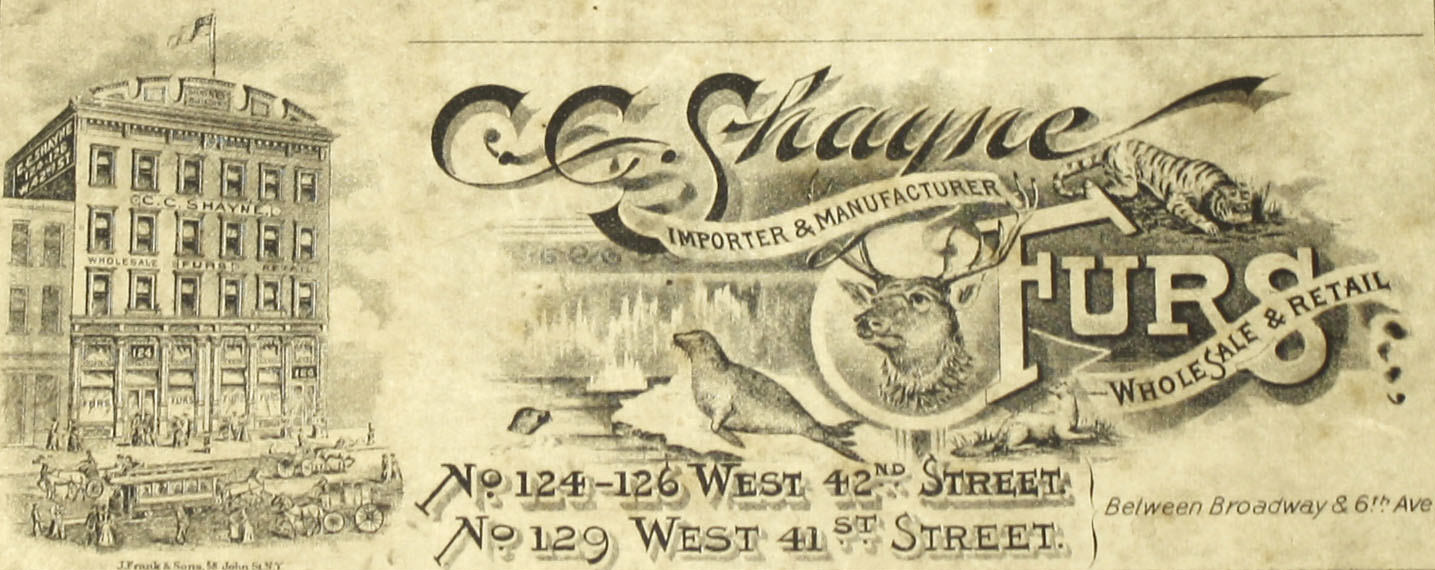
Art from Shayne's Emporium box label (C. C. Shayne) circa early 1900s

Shayne's Emporium was the largest retail fur establishment in the United States when it opened on October 3, 1893, in Manhattan, New York. It was located at 124 and 126 West 42nd Street, just west of 6th Avenue. The business' retail establishment was at 124 and the wholesale facility was at 126. The owner, Christopher Columbus Shayne, known as C. C., had removed his firm from 103 Prince Street, before opening the new building.

== Fur dealer ==
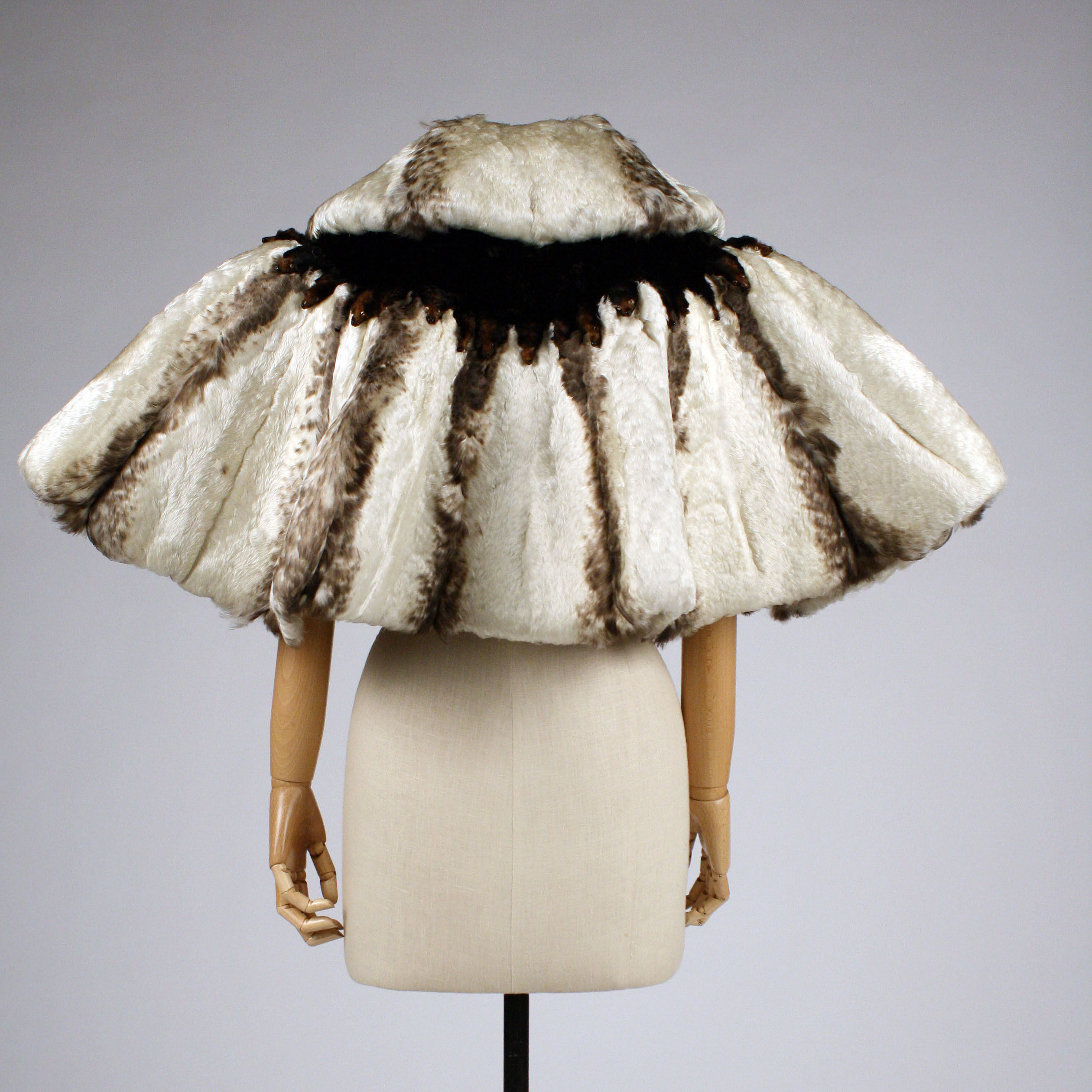
Cape of birdskins and mole fur, manufactured by C. C. Shaine, 1895 (Costume Institute, Metropolitan Museum of Art)

Shayne devoted a large amount of his time to his work and was rewarded with a reputation of honesty which extended worldwide. All the emporium's space was used, being filled with the skins of every kind of fur-bearing animal to be found on earth. No imitation furs were sold by Shayne and each of the hides was bought directly from wherever they were collected.

== Interior of edifice ==
The new structure was four stories tall with a frontage of fifty feet and a depth of one hundred feet. It possessed a robe department in its basement. In the rear of the retail and wholesale departments was an amphitheatre which measured forty feet by fifty feet. This structure was extremely well lighted with rows of windows and very large skylights. This enabled customers to make the best selections possible, with their chances to have detailed looks at the furs they perused. The amphitheatre was unique, the only one like it in the United States in 1893.

The upper floors of Shyane's Emporium were reserved for the processing of the furs, from preparing of the pelts to the finished products, fully and attractively lined furs. When the items were ready they were taken to the sales floor downstairs.

== Life and death of owner ==
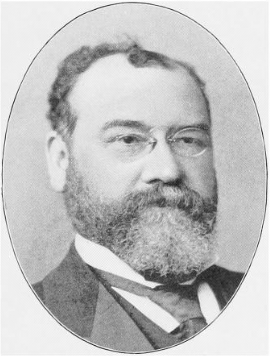
Christopher Columbus Shayne

Shayne was enmeshed in the political and business life of New York City, beginning in 1873. He was born in the village of Galway, Saratoga County, New York, on September 20, 1844. He was educated in the village schools and soon went to work in a hotel. Later he was a newsagent for the New York Central Railroad. He moved to Cincinnati, Ohio and secured employment with C.B. Camp & Company, fur dealers. He learned the business but sold out his interest in the company, moving to New York City in 1873. He opened his own business, first on Broadway, and afterward at Prince Street. He experienced bankruptcy in 1873, recovered, paid his creditors off, and built his business again.

Shayne was a strong supporter of the Democratic Party before he changed parties and became a fervent advocate of the Republican Party. He became vice-president of the Republican National League of the state of New York in 1895. He campaigned in many states and worked several states for Benjamin Harrison and William McKinley.

When Shayne died on February 22, 1906, he left a stock of furs in his emporium valued at $1 million. He was stricken after being diagnosed with a weak heart. He collapsed and died at the Piedmont Hotel in Atlanta, Georgia, while he was traveling with his wife, Margaret.
