= Two Musts =

Chinese Communist Party slogan

The Two Musts (Chinese: 两个务必) is a political slogan first proposed by Chinese Communist Party (CCP) chairman Mao Zedong in March 1949.

== History ==
The concept was first proposed by Mao Zedong at the second plenary session of the 7th Party Central Committee in March 1949.

== Content ==
According to the China Media Project, the Two Musts are that Party members must:

- "continue to keep a style of humility and hard work"
- "maintain an attitude of struggle against hardships."

== See also ==
- Three Musts
