= 70th anniversary of the Xinjiang Uygur Autonomous Region =

70th anniversary of the Xinjiang Uygur Autonomous Region 新疆维吾尔自治区成立70周年
- Date: 23 September 2025
- Locations: Xinjiang, China
- Previous event: 60th anniversary of the Xinjiang Uygur Autonomous Region
- Participants: National leaders
- General Secretary of the CCP: Xi Jinping

The 70th Anniversary of the Xinjiang Uygur Autonomous Region (Chinese: 庆祝新疆维吾尔自治区成立70周年) in 2025 consisted of a series of events conducted on 23 September 2025 to honor the founding of the Xinjiang Uygur Autonomous Region. Xi Jinping, General Secretary of the Chinese Communist Party, participated in the celebratory meeting, marking the first time the CCP General Secretary attended an event commemorating Xinjiang Uygur Autonomous Region's anniversary.

== Engagements ==
Xi Jinping, General Secretary of the Chinese Communist Party, participated in the celebratory meeting, marking the first time the CCP General Secretary attended an event commemorating Xinjiang Uygur Autonomous Region's anniversary. During his visit, he called on officials to hold the "people’s line of defense against terrorism and instability", foster a sense of community for the Chinese nation, and promote tourism.

Wang Huning, a member of the Politburo Standing Committee of the Chinese Communist Party and the Chairman of the Chinese People's Political Consultative Conference, delivered a speech, where he praised CCP policies regarding Xinjiang. Xi was also accompanied by CCP Office Director Cai Qi.
