= America Against America =

1991 book by Wang Huning

- Author: Wang Huning
- Original title: 美国反对美国
- Language: Simplified Chinese
- Genre: Politics
- Publisher: Shanghai Literature and Art Publishing House
- Publication date: 1991
- Publication place: Mainland China
- Media type: Print

America Against America (Chinese: 美国反对美国; pinyin: Měiguó fǎnduì měiguó) is a nonfiction book written by Chinese political scientist Wang Huning, who is currently one of the seven members of Politburo Standing Committee and also the chairman of the National Committee of the Chinese People's Political Consultative Conference, about his experiences as a visiting scholar to the United States in 1988.

== Synopsis ==
The book discusses Wang's experiences as a six-months visiting scholar in the United States. The first three months at the University of Iowa, three weeks at the University of California, Berkeley, then visiting about 20 universities within 30 cities. The book talks about the increasing challenges he saw in the U.S., such as inequality, economic conflicts, decaying of social values and commodification. He also praised the strengths of the U.S., such as its modernity, and peaceful transitions of power, and was described by The Economist as "seeing the weaknesses in America's system, but not exaggerating them". In Wang's own words:

My intention with this title is to show that America contains contradictions that cannot be dismissed with a single sentence. In the old days, people had a dogmatic view of American society as merely the "exploitation of surplus value," a "dictatorship of the bourgeoisie," and nothing more. Now there is another extreme, some people imagine the United States as a paradise, rich and without flaw. In fact American society doesn't match either of these descriptions, and often finds itself in fundamental contradiction with them. There are strengths and weaknesses, and wherever strength can be found, weakness can also be found. America is a contradiction, it contains multitudes. This is what I mean by "America Against America."

Wang also discussed Japan's rise in the 1980s, contrasting its system with that of the United States. The Financial Times states:

Wang was not surprised by Japan's success, observing that the "American system which is generally based on individualism, hedonism and democracy, is clearly losing out to a system of collectivism, self-forgetfulness and authoritarianism". But he did not buy the idea of Japan as Number One, the title of another popular book of the time. As he correctly observed, Japan lacked the resources and territory to surpass the United States. ... On the other hand, Japan he predicted would only be the first nation to challenge the US: "In the next century more nations are bound to challenge the United States as well. It is then that Americans will truly reflect on their politics, economy and culture." He does not need to spell out which nations — or nation — he has in mind.

== Reception ==
In 2021, the book received renewed interest in the aftermath of the storming of the United States Capitol, with some used copies surging to 16,600 yuan ($2,500) on antiques sites. In 2025, the Financial Times stated, "A book published more than 30 years ago by a close confidant of Xi Jinping now looks uncannily prescient."

== See also ==
- Political Life
