= Central Policy Research Office =

Institution of the Central Committee of the Chinese Communist Party

- 中共中央政策研究室
- Emblem of the Chinese Communist Party

Agency overview
- Formed: 1981; 45 years ago
- Preceding agencies: Research Office of the Secretariat; Central Office for Political Structure Reform
- Type: Organization directly reporting to the Central Committee; Ministerial level agency
- Jurisdiction: Chinese Communist Party
- Headquarters: 2 Sha Tan Bei Jie, Dongcheng District, Beijing
- Agency executives: Tang Fangyu, Director; Zhang Ji, Deputy Director; Tian Peiyan, Deputy Director
- Parent agency: Central Committee of the Chinese Communist Party

Policy Research office of the Central Committee of the Chinese Communist Party
- Simplified Chinese: 中国共产党中央委员会政策研究室
- Traditional Chinese: 中國共產黨中央委員會政策研究室
Transcriptions
Standard Mandarin
- Hanyu Pinyin: Zhōngguó Gòngchǎndǎng Zhōngyāng Wěiyuánhuì Zhèngcè Yánjiūshì

Central Policy Research Office
- Simplified Chinese: 中共中央政策研究室
- Traditional Chinese: 中共中央政策研究室
Transcriptions
Standard Mandarin
- Hanyu Pinyin: Zhōnggòng Zhōngyāng Zhèngcè Yánjiūshì

Abbreviation
- Chinese: 中央政研室
Transcriptions
Standard Mandarin
- Hanyu Pinyin: Zhōngyāng Zhèngyánshì

The Central Policy Research Office (CPRO) is an institution of the Central Committee of the Chinese Communist Party responsible for providing policy recommendations and insights to matters of governance, spanning political, social, and economic realms. It is responsible for drafting the ideology and theories of the Chinese Communist Party (CCP), as well as various policy pronouncements at major congresses or plenums.

== History ==
This office was founded in 1981, following the Cultural Revolution and Boluan Fanzheng. Initially, it was an office under the Secretariat of the Chinese Communist Party. Deng Liqun served as its first director. In 1987, after the ouster of reformer Hu Yaobang as CCP General Secretary and also as a result of Deng Liqun being politically sidelined, the office was re-organized and renamed as the Central Office for Political Structure Reform, headed by Bao Tong, at the time the main secretary to then-party leader Zhao Ziyang. Bao was later purged along with his boss, when Zhao fell out of favour after the 1989 Tiananmen Square protests and massacre. In that year, the Political Reform Office was merged with the "Central Rural Research Office", after which it took on its current name.

The office was a major force behind crafting the ideologies of three successive administrations: the "Three Represents" of Jiang Zemin, the Scientific Outlook on Development of Hu Jintao, and the Chinese Dream of Xi Jinping. Wang Huning, who took charge of the office in 2002, is seen as one of the main advisors of Xi Jinping.

Administratively, the office is at the same level as a ministry of state. Its former head Wang Huning, has been a member of the Politburo of the Chinese Communist Party since 2012, and prior to that, a member of the Secretariat. This accorded Wang a "deputy national leader" rank. Additionally, beginning in 2013, the Office of the Central Comprehensively Deepening Reforms Commission is located at this office and is headed by Wang Huning.

== Responsibilities ==
The office is tasked with drafting the work reports to the party congresses and major party conferences, including Party Congress reports and plenum decisions, as well as drafting and revising "major documents of the party centre" and "some major speeches of central leaders." It also provides insights and research for party ideology and theories, as well as the feasibility of major policy initiatives. It is also to analyze and collect data on the state of the economy and send related recommendations to the party leadership. The office also oversees the operations of the Central Comprehensively Deepening Reforms Commission.

== Structure ==
The office is composed of several departments, each overseeing politics, economics, "party-building", philosophy and history, culture, international affairs, general affairs, and rural affairs, respectively. In 2007, a department focused on "social affairs" was created. The office is located within the CCP General Office, which has been called the party's "nerve center".

=== Internal organization ===
- Office
- General Bureau
- Economic Bureau (Note: Economic Bureau of the Office of the Central Commission for Comprehensively Deepening Reform)
- Information Bureau
- Political Research Bureau
- Rural Research Bureau (Note: Rural Bureau of the Office of the Central Commission for Comprehensively Deepening Reform)
- Cultural Research Bureau (Note: Cultural Bureau of the Office of the Central Commission for Comprehensively Deepening Reform)
- Bureau of Social Research
- Party Building Bureau (Note: Party Building Bureau of the Office of the Central Commission for Comprehensively Deepening Reform)
- Personnel Bureau
- Party Committee

=== Directly affiliated institutions ===
- Study and Research Magazine

== List of directors ==
1. Deng Liqun, as director of the Research Office of the Secretariat (1981 – September 1987)
2. Bao Tong, as director of the Office for Political Structure Reform (December 1987 – July 1989)
3. Wang Weicheng (August 1989 – August 1997)
4. Teng Wensheng (August 1997 – October 2002)
5. Wang Huning (October 2002 – October 2020)
6. Jiang Jinquan (October 2020 – January 2026)
7. Tang Fangyu (January 2026 – present)
