= Remain true to our original aspiration and keep our mission firmly in mind =

Chinese Communist Party slogan

- Simplified Chinese: 不忘初心，牢记使命
Transcriptions
Standard Mandarin
- Hanyu Pinyin: Bùwàng chūxīn, láojì shǐmìng

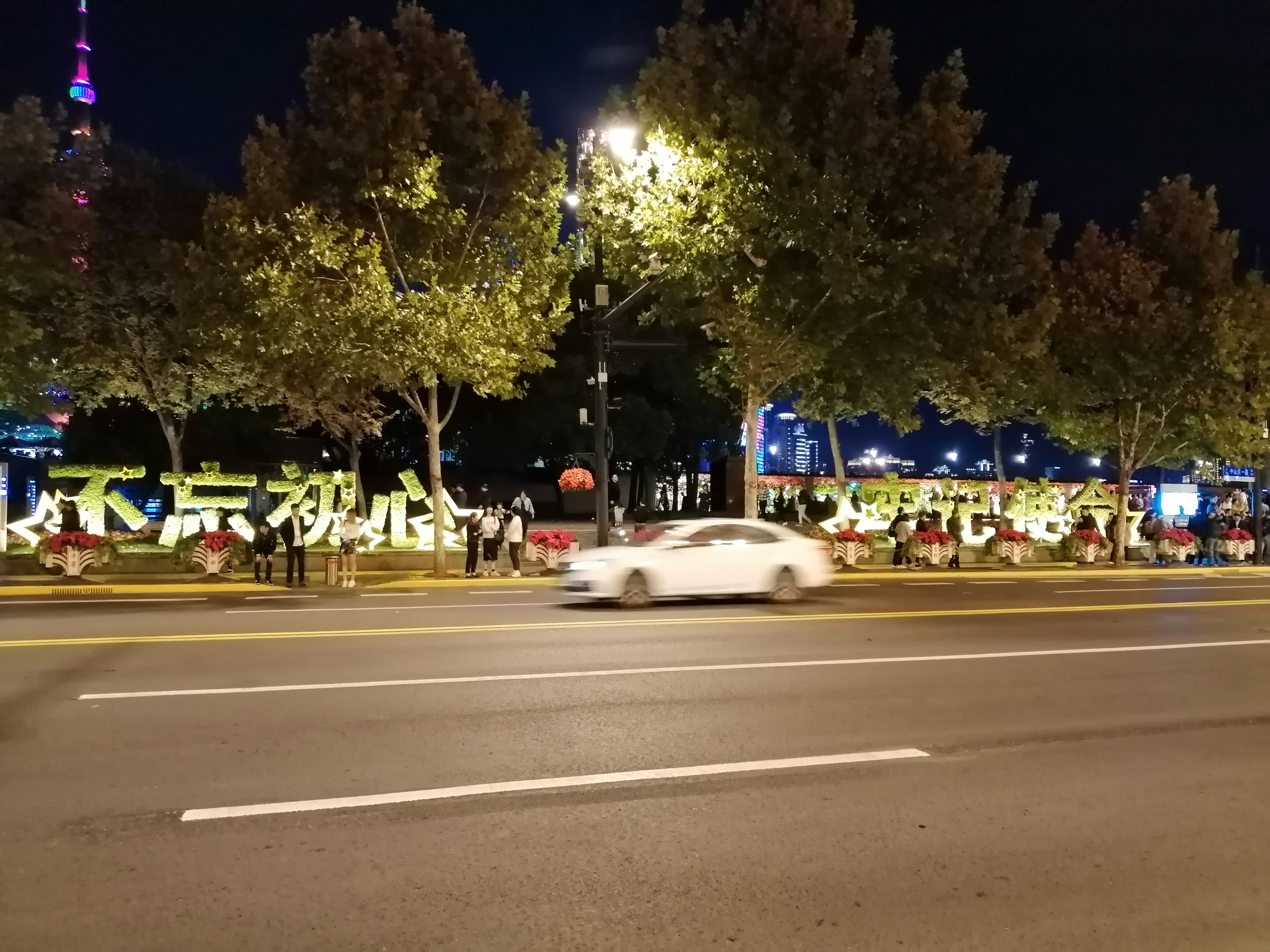
The slogan "remain true to our original aspiration and keep our mission firmly in mind" on the Bund roadside in Shanghai

Remain true to our original aspiration and keep our mission firmly in mind is a political slogan and education campaign initiated by the Chinese Communist Party (CCP) under General Secretary Xi Jinping. Overseen by first-ranking secretary of the CCP Secretariat Wang Huning, the campaign began in June 2019 and concluded by January 2020.

== History ==
One of the earliest mentions of the term "remaining true to our original aspiration" came on 26 December 2013, the 120th anniversary of Mao Zedong, when scholar Huang Huilin wrote "Never forget the original intention, so that we can reach ultimate success" in the People's Daily. The eight-character version used by Huang originates from Buddhāvataṃsaka Sūtra, referring to the adherence to the original intention of Buddha. From 2013 to 2015, mentions of the slogan in People's Daily largely were applications of the original Buddhist phrase. By 2016, it started to gain more political use. In a June 2016 article, the People's Daily highlighted the importance of "Marxist journalism education", saying China must "strengthen education and guidance" and continuing by writing "leading students to not forget the original intention, to not forget the roots, to not deviate from the direction [of the Party], and to stiffen the 'backbone' of a more determined army of news reservists".

On 1 July 2016, General Secretary Xi Jinping gave a speech commemorating the 95th anniversary of the CCP. State media widely reported that the main idea of the speech was "not forgetting the original intention and continuing to move forward", which they wrote as "the Party always maintains the original intention of the people, always adheres to the people's position, and always maintains the spirit of struggle [enshrined] with the CCP's founding." This phrase was used for the much of 2017 ahead of the 17th Party National Congress. The current phrase "remain true to our original aspiration and keep our mission firmly in mind" first appeared in May 2017 in a message of congratulation on the first successful flight of the Comac C919 by the Party leadership. The phrase was given more weight when Xi mentioned it during his political report to the 17th Party Congress in October 2017, where he proposed that the CCP should launch an educational campaign and stated that the original mission of the CCP is to "seek happiness for the Chinese people and rejuvenation for the Chinese nation".

=== Educational campaign ===
On 13 May 2019, Xi chaired a meeting of the CCP Politburo and decided to carry out the "remain true to our original aspiration and keep our mission firmly in mind" themed education activities in two batches from June 2019, with a focus on leading cadres at the county and department level and above. Xi called to "study and implement" Xi Jinping Thought with "the specific goals of gaining theoretical learning and being baptized in ideology and politics". At the "remain true to our original aspiration and keep our mission firmly in mind" themed education work conference held on 31 May, the Central Leading Group for the "Remain True to Our Original Aspiration and Keep Our Mission Firmly in Mind" Thematic Education made its debut, with Wang Huning, a member of the Politburo Standing Committee and first-ranking secretary of the CCP Secretariat, as the group leader. The official themes of the campaign included striving to avoid formalism and bureaucracy, educating and guiding Party members and cadres to bear in mind the Party's purpose, adhering to the ideological line of seeking truth from facts, establishing a correct view of political achievements, work hard and changing work styles, and integrating learning, education, investigation, research, problem-finding, and rectification and implementation throughout the entire process.

On 24 June 2019, the Central Leading Group issued the "Notice on Carrying out the First Batch of Thematic Education Study, Investigation, Research, Problem Review, and Rectification and Implementation Work". On 5 September 2019, the Central Leading Group issued the "Guiding Opinions on Carrying out the Second Batch of "Remain True to Our Original Aspiration and Keep Our Mission Firmly in Mind" Theme Education". The second batch of the theme education was completed at the end of November. On 4 November 2019, the Central Leading Group issued the "Notice on a Review of the Rectification and Implementation of the First Batch of Thematic Education Units" On 23 December 2019, the Central Leading Group issued the "Notice on Carefully Summarizing the Work of the "Remain True to Our Original Aspirations, Keep Our Mission Firmly in Mind" Thematic Education".

On 8 January 2020, the summary meeting of the campaign was held in Beijing. Xi Jinping mentioned that the education campaign had basically ended. Xi praised the progress of the campaign, stating ideological texts had made Party members "more aware of the importance of connecting knowledge and beliefs with action". He added the campaign had strengthened cadres "faith in Marxism and their conviction in socialism with Chinese characteristics", which was necessary as "the advanced and wholesome nature of a Marxist Party will not be naturally preserved as time goes by, nor will members' Party consciousness automatically strengthen with their length of service or job advancement". Xi said "ideological education is the key link to be grasped in uniting the whole Party for great political struggle" and that it was only through party members' "pursuit of the truth" using "the scientific theory of Marxism" that they could improve their "ideological and theoretical understanding" and "stay true to our original aspiration".

== See also ==
- List of campaigns of the Chinese Communist Party
