= Fujian Free-Trade Zone =

Fujian Free-Trade Zone 中国（福建）自由贸易试验区
- Free-Trade Zone
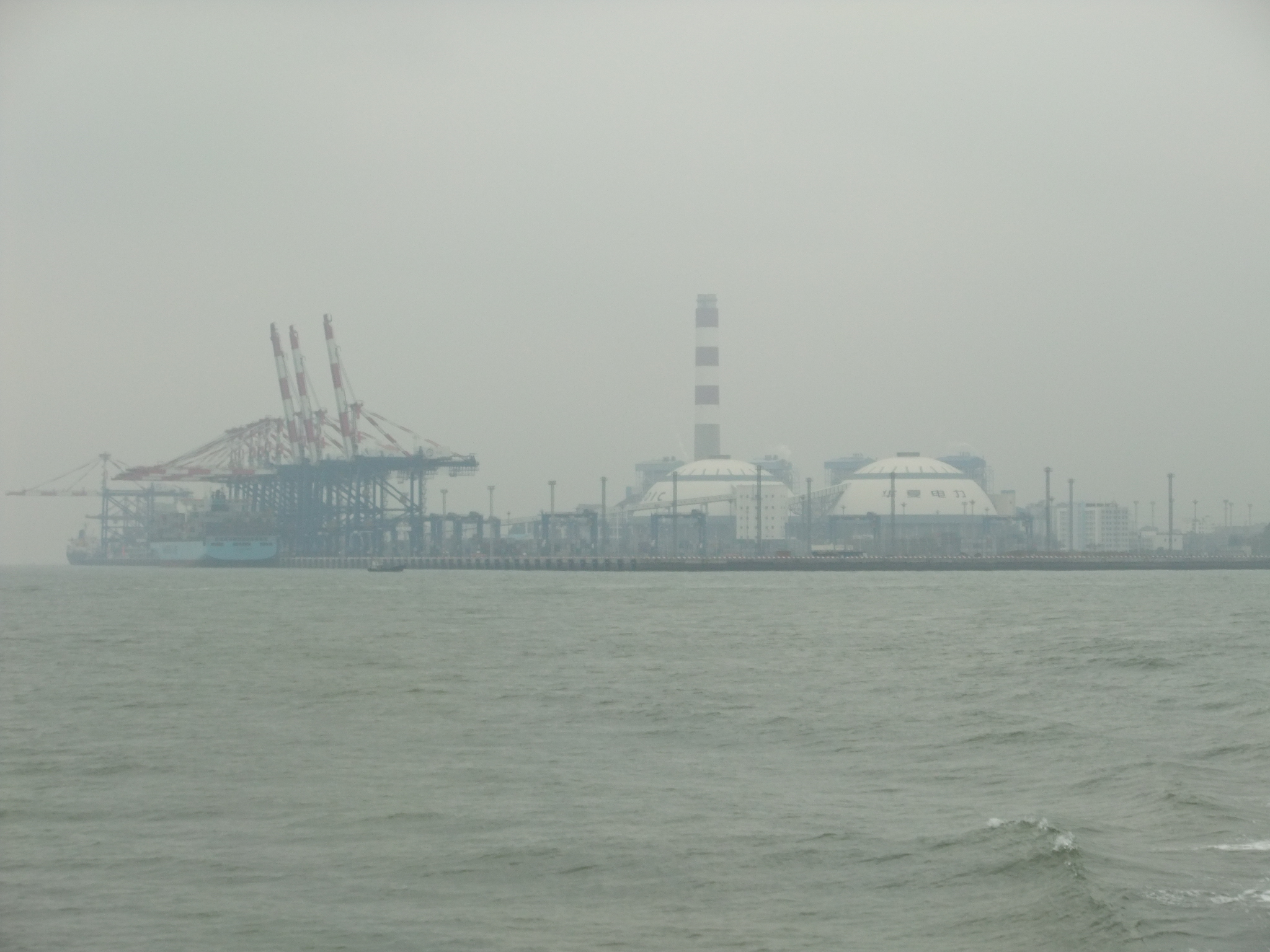
- Country: China
- Municipality: Fuzhou; Xiamen

Area
  - Total: 118.04 km^{2} (45.58 sq mi)
- Time zone: UTC+8 (China Standard)
- Website: http://www.china-fjftz.gov.cn/

Fujian Free-Trade Zone (Fujian FTZ, colloquially known as 福建自由贸易区/福建自贸区 in Chinese), officially China (Fujian) Pilot Free-Trade Zone (Chinese: 中国（福建）自由贸易试验区; pinyin: Zhōngguó (Fújiàn) Zìyóu Màoyì Shìyànqū) is a free-trade zone in Fujian province, China. The mainland free-trade zone is the nearest to Taiwan. The zone covers an area of 118.04 square kilometres and integrates three existing bonded zones in three areas — Pingtan Subdistrict (43 square kilometres), Fuzhou Subdistrict (31.26 square kilometres) and Xiamen Subdistrict (43.78 square kilometres). Fujian FTZ was founded in Mawei District, Fuzhou on 21 April 2015.

== See also ==
- Economic Cooperation Framework Agreement
- Cross-Strait Service Trade Agreement
