= Tang Fangyu =

Chinese politician

Tang Fangyu (Chinese: 唐方裕) is the head of the Central Policy Research Office of the Central Committee of the Chinese Communist Party. He was the deputy director of the General Office of the Chinese Communist Party and head of its Research Department.

== Biography ==
Tang Fangyu comes from Nanchong, Sichuan. He was born in August 1963.
