= Political Life =

1995 book by Wang Huning

- Author: Wang Huning
- Original title: 政治的人生
- Language: Mandarin Chinese
- Genre: Diary
- Publisher: Shanghai People's Press
- Publication date: January 1995
- Publication place: Mainland China
- Media type: Print

Political Life is a diary written by Chinese political scientist Wang Huning. The diary records Wang's personal life, political theory research, reviews of books, film, and television, as well as his thoughts on China, the world, and social issues.

== Content ==
The book does not include an interpretation of official political life. In the book's preface, Wang said: "The reason why I named it "Political Life" is not to refer to a political experience, but to say that as a political scholar, I have spent most of my time on my professional studies, and this study has occupied most of my life." He wrote in his diary, "People living today often say that the our predecessors were incompetent and made China the way it is now. I hope that Chinese people in the future will not say that Chinese people today are incompetent and made China like this. This is my greatest wish."

Wang criticizes corruption in his book and proposes a fight against "super corruption", which he says is both more harmful and incomparable to general corruption activities in scale and nature. He says "super corruption" has two characteristics; one is that it is done with the participation of certain public powers and the other being that it appears in the form of a group rather than an individual. He said the status of law in China had not yet reached that of foreign countries. He also wrote that the "government's credibility is depends on fulfilling the government's overall promise to the people it governs".

In the book, Wang commented about his non-political interests, including foreign movies, mystics who claim to have supernatural powers, and his experiences playing Monopoly. He writes that his goal in life is to "write more good books and teach more good students". He also wrote about his habit of reading books late into the night, and included reviews of the books he read, including The Old Regime and the Revolution by Alexis de Tocqueville and The Legend of the Condor Heroes by Jin Yong. He wrote reviews of movies he watched, including Alien, Dangerous Liaisons, In the Name of the Father, and Schindler's List.

== Publication ==
The book was published by Shanghai People's Press in January 1995.
