= Sense of community for the Chinese nation =

Chinese Communist Party slogan

Sense of community for the Chinese nation (Chinese: 中华民族共同体; pinyin: Zhōnghuá mínzú gòngtóngtǐ) is Chinese Communist Party (CCP) political slogan used by general secretary Xi Jinping in November 2012.

== History ==
The term was first proposed by general secretary Xi Jinping at the 18th National Congress of the Chinese Communist Party in November 2012. It was first officially proposed by Xi at the Second Central Symposium on Xinjiang Work in 2014.

== Concept ==
The concept of the sense of community for the Chinese nation includes important contents such as the Four Commonalities (identification in the four aspects of "territory", "history", " culture" and "spirit" during the formation of the Chinese nation's history), the Four Commonalities (guiding the people of all ethnic groups to firmly establish the concept of "community" of "sharing weal and woe", "sharing honor and disgrace", "sharing life and death" and "sharing destiny") and the Five Identifications (promoting the formation of identification among all ethnic groups with the great motherland, the Chinese nation, Chinese culture, the Chinese Communist Party and socialism with Chinese characteristics).
