= Documentation Research Office =

Defunct body of the Chinese Communist Party

The Literature Research Office (Chinese: 中共中央文献研究室), or the Documentation Research Office of the Central Committee of the Chinese Communist Party, was an office of the now-defunct Literature Editorial Committee of the CCP Central Committee, functioning as a working department and a research institute directly under the CCP Central Committee.

== History ==
In 1950, the Central Committee of the Chinese Communist Party formed the Publication Committee for the Selected Works of Mao Zedong, chaired by Liu Shaoqi. In March 1977, the CCP Central Committee sanctioned the formation of the Office of the Committee for the Editing and Publication of the Writings of Chairman Mao Zedong (Chinese: 中共中央毛泽东主席著作编辑出版委员会办公室), which was restructured into the Literature Research Office of the Central Committee of the CCP by a Central Committee decision in May 1980. The CCP Central Committee has overseen the publication of the selected writings of Mao Zedong.

In March 2018, during a series of institutional reforms, the CCP Central Committee announced that the Documentation Research Office of the CCP Central Committee would be dissolved, with its responsibilities transferred to the Institute of Party History and Literature.

== Objectives ==
- Revise the writings of Mao Zedong, Zhou Enlai, Liu Shaoqi, Zhu De, Ren Bishi, Deng Xiaoping, Chen Yun, and other senior revolutionaries, as well as the current principal leaders of the Central Committee, and edit significant contemporary and historical documents pertaining to the party, the state, and the military.
- To compose chronicles, biographies, and biographical studies on Mao Zedong, Zhou Enlai, Liu Shaoqi, Zhu De, Ren Bishi, Deng Xiaoping, Chen Yun, and other prominent revolutionaries of the older generation, along with significant leaders of the Central Government, as well as to examine their writings, biographies, and ideologies;
- To examine and disseminate Mao Zedong Thought and Deng Xiaoping Theory;
- To gather pertinent research advancements both domestically and internationally, and to facilitate essential interactions among scholars from both regions;
- Evaluating or aiding in the evaluation and analysis of unpublished historical manuscripts, associated audio-visual materials concerning Mao Zedong, Zhou Enlai, Liu Shaoqi, Zhu De, Ren Bishi, Deng Xiaoping, Chen Yun, and the current members of the Central Committee Standing Committee that are prepared for public release or publication, in addition to significant books, articles, and audio-visual works pertaining to the lives and contributions of prominent party and state leaders, as well as film and television productions centered on major revolutionary historical themes;
- It is tasked with reaching out to the editors of works by older revolutionary figures and prominent leaders of the former Central Committee, as well as compiling chronicles and biographies as designated by the Central Committee for the Central Documentation and Research Office.
- Executing additional responsibilities delegated by the Party Central Committee and particular duties of the Central Documentation Editorial Committee of the CCP.

== Organization ==
- Office of Scientific Research and Management
- Office of Publicity and Foreign Affairs
- The inaugural Editorial and Research Department (responsible for editing Mao Zedong's publications, composing his chronicles and biographies, and investigating his thinking and life).
- The Second Editorial and Research Department (editing the works of Zhou Enlai, Liu Shaoqi, Zhu De, and Ren Bishi, writing their chronicles and biographies, and researching their thoughts and biographies)
- The Third Editorial and Research Department (responsible for editing the works of Deng Xiaoping and Chen Yun, composing their chronicles and biographies, and conducting research on their thoughts and lives)
- The Fourth Editorial and Research Department (editing and researching the writings of Jiang Zemin and other leading members of the Third Generation of the Central Leadership Group with Comrade Jiang Zemin as the core)
- The Fifth Editorial and Research Department (editing and researching the important literature of the Party Central Committee with Comrade Hu Jintao as the General Secretary, etc.)
- The Sixth Editorial and Research Department (editing and researching the writings of General Secretary Xi Jinping and the important literature of the Party Central Committee since the 18th National Congress, etc.)
- Committee of Party Organizations Journal of Party Literature
- Central Literature Publishing House (Chinese: 中央文献出版社)

== Past leaders ==
=== Office of the Committee for the Editing and Publication of the Writings of Chairman Mao Zedong ===
Director

- Wang Dongxing (March 1977-December 1978)
- Hu Qiaomu (December 1978-May 1980)

First Deputy Director

- Li Qi (January–May 1980)

Deputy Director

- Li Xin (March 1977-January 1980)
- Wu Lengxi (March 1977-January 1980)
- Jia Bubin (March 1977-January 1980)
- Hu Jiao (March 1977-May 1980)
- Xiong Fu (March 1977-January 1980)
- Wu Jianhua (March 1977-January 1980)
- Liao Gailong (January–May 1980)
- Gong Yuzhi (January–May 1980)

=== Documentation Research Office ===
Director

- Hu Qiaomu (May 1980 - April 1982)
- Li Qi (April 1982-June 1991)
- Pang Xianzhi (June 1991-October 2002)
- Teng Wensheng (October 2002-December 2007)
- Leng Rong (December 2007 - March 2018)

First Deputy Director

- Li Qi (May 1980-April 1982)

Executive Deputy Director

- PANG Xianzhi (January 1986-June 1991)
- Jin Chonghe (December 1991-October 2004)
- Leng Rongl (April 2001-October 2004)
- Yang Shengqun (May 2006 - January 2014)

Deputy Director

- Hu Jiao (May 1980-April 1982)
- Wu Lengxi (May 1980-April 1982)
- Liao Gailong (May 1980-April 1982)
- Gong Yuchi (May 1980-February 1988)
- Pang Xianzhi (July 1982-June 1991)
- Jin Chonghe (March 1984-October 2004)
- Wu Jianguo (April 1991-November 1997)
- Chen Qun (June 1995 - November 2006)
- Yang Shengqun (November 1997 - January 2014)
- Leng Rong (November 1997 - October 2004)
- Li Jie (October 2004 - March 2012)
- Dong Hong (March 2006 - August 2013)
- Chen Jin (March 2008 - March 2018)
- Zhang Hongzhi (May 2012 - March 2018)
- Zhuo Songsheng (February 2014 - February 2016)
- Sun Yeli (February 2014 - March 2018)
- Chen Yangyong (June 2016 - March 2018)

== See also ==
- Institute of Party History and Literature
- Central Party School
- Central Policy Research Office
- Compilation and Translation Bureau
