= Bibliography of works by Xi Jinping =

This bibliography of Xi Jinping is a chronological list of written and published works with his byline. His works are known to be ghostwritten by a group of academics, overseen by Wang Huning. As of 2025, 130 books have purportedly been authored by Xi.

== Selected works ==
=== Books ===
- Xi, Jinping (1999). Theory and Practice on Modern Agriculture. Fuzhou: Fujian Education Press.
- Xi, Jinping (2007). Zhijiang Xinyu. Hangzhou: Zhengjiang People's Publishing House. ISBN 9787213035081.
- Xi, Jinping (2014). The Governance of China. Vol. I. Beijing: Foreign Languages Press. ISBN 9787119090573.
- Xi, Jinping (2014). Reader of General Secretary Xi Jinping's Series of Important Speeches. Vol. I. Beijing: People's Publishing House & Study Publishing House. ISBN 9787119090573.
- Xi, Jinping (2016). Reader of General Secretary Xi Jinping's Series of Important Speeches. Vol. II. Beijing: People's Publishing House & Study Publishing House. ISBN 9787514706284.
- Xi, Jinping (2017). The Governance of China. Vol. II. Beijing: Foreign Languages Press. ISBN 9787119111643.
- Xi, Jinping (2019). The Belt And Road Initiative. Beijing: Foreign Languages Press. ISBN 978-7119119960.
- Xi, Jinping (2020). The Governance of China. Vol. III. Beijing: Foreign Languages Press. ISBN 9787119124117.
- Xi, Jinping (2020). On Propaganda and Ideological Work of Communist Party. Beijing: Central Party Literature Press. ISBN 9787507347791.
- Xi, Jinping (2021). On History of the Communist Party of China. Beijing: Central Party Literature Press. ISBN 9787507348033.
- Xi, Jinping (2022). The Governance of China. Vol. IV. Beijing: Foreign Languages Press. ISBN 9787119130941.

=== Articles ===
- Xi, Jinping (2001). A Tentative Study on China's Rural Marketization (PDF). Beijing: Tsinghua University (Doctoral Dissertation). Archived from the original (PDF) on 17 January 2013.
