= A Concise History of the Communist Party of China =

Chinese Communist Party book

- Original title: 中国共产党简史
- Language: Mandarin Chinese (translated into several world languages, including English)
- Genre: History
- Publisher: People's Publishing House; CCP Party History Press
- Publication date: February 2021
- Publication place: People's Republic of China
- English publication date: 2021
- Media type: Print (Hardcover, Paperback)
- Pages: 531
- ISBN: 978-7-01-023203-4

A Concise History of the Communist Party of China is a book about the history of the Chinese Communist Party (CCP). It was approved by the CCP Central Committee, organized by the CCP Publicity Department, and compiled by the Institute of Party History and Literature along with other units to support the Campaign on Party History Learning and Education. It was jointly published by the People's Publishing House and the CCP History Press in February 2021. Books with the same title have been published in 2001 and 2010.

== Content ==
The book consists of 10 chapters and 70 sections, totaling approximately 531 pages and 280,000 words, and recounts the 100-year history of the Chinese Communist Party. The 33 years from the Third Plenary Session of the 11th CCP Central Committee to the 17th CCP National Congress account for 30% of the book, while the nearly 10 years since Xi Jinping assumed office as general secretary in 2012 account for 27.5%, with a particular focus on the history of the Party since the 18th CCP National Congress.

Compared with party history textbooks published in previous years, this book simplifies the history of the Cultural Revolution, includes "socialist construction developed amid twists and turns" in Chapter 6, Section 3, and adds achievements in national defense, diplomacy, and economy during the Cultural Revolution. Previous party history textbooks, such as Seventy Years of the Communist Party of China and History of the Communist Party of China published in 1991 and 2002, made the "Cultural Revolution" and "Ten Years of Civil War" independent chapters. However, this book still maintains the historical resolution of the Cultural Revolution.

== Release ==
The book was jointly published by the People's Publishing House and the CCP History Press in February 2021. In July, its English version was published in the United Kingdom.
