= Bibliography of works about Xi Jinping =

- Xi Jinping in 2026
- Subject: Xi Jinping
- Scope: Books, journal articles, primary sources
- Period covered: 1953 – present
- Languages: English
- Related: Bibliography of Chinese history

This is a bibliography of works about Xi Jinping, general secretary of the Chinese Communist Party since 2012, covering his life, rise to power, political thought and leadership. Works written by Xi are listed at Bibliography of Xi Jinping. Works on China during his time in power are listed at Bibliography of the Xi Jinping era.

This bibliography contains academic-level English-language books (including translations) and journal articles. Book entries may have references to reviews published in academic journals or major newspapers when these could be considered helpful. These reference reviews also function as a resource to find other works on this subject.

Works listed here are cited in the notes or bibliographies of scholarly sources. Each is published by an academic or major trade press, written by a recognized expert, or substantially reviewed in scholarly journals; borderline cases are omitted. A selection of primary sources is included. Many of the books below carry their own bibliographies; see Further reading section for longer ones, and External links section for historical sites and museums.

Citations follow APA style. (Note: Entries are in plain text APA 7 format without templates; templates are used only for reviews and notes.) Books have citations to academic journal or mainstream published reviews when available. For books only partly about the subject, relevant chapter or section titles are given where useful and available. Translators of the original-language edition are included when possible. In cases where a title or name has appeared with more than one English spelling, the most recent published form is used and a footnote documents any earlier title under which the work appeared.

== Biography ==
- Bo, Z. (2017). China's political dynamics under Xi Jinping. World Scientific. doi:10.1142/10186
- Bougon, F. (2018). Inside the mind of Xi Jinping (Updated English ed.). Hurst. (Original work published 2017)
- Brown, K. (2016). CEO, China: The rise of Xi Jinping. I.B. Tauris. doi:10.5040/9781350985650
- Brown, K. (2018). The world according to Xi: Everything you need to know about the new China. I.B. Tauris. doi:10.5040/9781350989405
- Brown, K. (2022). Xi: A study in power. Icon Books.
- Chan, A. L. (2022). Xi Jinping: Political career, governance, and leadership, 1953–2018. Oxford University Press. doi:10.1093/oso/9780197615225.001.0001
- Lam, W. W.-L. (2015). Chinese politics in the era of Xi Jinping: Renaissance, reform, or retrogression? Routledge. doi:10.4324/9781315719368
- Lam, W. W.-L. (2023). Xi Jinping: The hidden agendas of China's ruler for life. Routledge. doi:10.4324/9781003303589
- Li, C. (2016). Chinese politics in the Xi Jinping era: Reassessing collective leadership. Brookings Institution Press. doi:10.5040/9780815750963
- Ranade, J. (2022). Xi Jinping: China's third new era. Routledge. doi:10.4324/9781003349549
- Shambaugh, D. (2021). China's leaders: From Mao to now. Polity.
- Shih, V. C. (2022). Coalitions of the weak: Elite politics in China from Mao's stratagem to the rise of Xi. Cambridge University Press. doi:10.1017/9781009022859
- Torigian, J. (2025). The party's interests come first: The life of Xi Zhongxun, father of Xi Jinping. Stanford University Press. doi:10.1515/9781503640986
- Wong, C. H. (2023). Party of one: The rise of Xi Jinping and China's superpower future. Avid Reader Press.

== Power and leadership ==
- Baranovitch, N. (2021). A strong leader for a time of crisis: Xi Jinping's strongman politics as a collective response to regime weakness. Journal of Contemporary China, 30(128), 249–265. doi:10.1080/10670564.2020.1790901
- Barrass, G., & Inkster, N. (2018). Xi Jinping: The strategist behind the dream. Survival, 60(1), 41–68. doi:10.1080/00396338.2018.1427363
- Blanchette, J., & Medeiros, E. S. (2022). Xi Jinping's third term. Survival, 64(5), 61–90. doi:10.1080/00396338.2022.2126179
- Brown, K. (2017). The powers of Xi Jinping. Asian Affairs, 48(1), 17–26. doi:10.1080/03068374.2016.1267435
- Cabestan, J.-P. (2019). Political changes in China since the 19th CCP Congress: Xi Jinping is not weaker but more contested. East Asia, 36(1), 1–21. doi:10.1007/s12140-019-09305-x
- Doyon, J. (2018). Clientelism by design: Personnel politics under Xi Jinping. Journal of Current Chinese Affairs, 47(3), 87–110. doi:10.1177/186810261804700304
- Economy, E. C. (2018). The third revolution: Xi Jinping and the new Chinese state. Oxford University Press.
- Esarey, A. (2021). Propaganda as a lens for assessing Xi Jinping's leadership. Journal of Contemporary China, 30(132), 888–901. doi:10.1080/10670564.2021.1893555
- Esarey, A., & Han, R. (Eds.). (2024). The Xi Jinping effect. University of Washington Press. doi:10.1515/9780295752822
- Feldman, S. P. (2021). Dictatorship by degrees: Xi Jinping in China. Lexington Books. doi:10.5771/9781793616685
- Feldman, S. P. (2023). Xi Jinping's anticorruption campaign: The politics of revenge. Routledge. doi:10.4324/9781003331063
- Gueorguiev, D. D. (2018). Dictator's shadow: Chinese elite politics under Xi Jinping. China Perspectives, 2018(1–2), 17–26. doi:10.4000/chinaperspectives.7569
- Guo, X. (2019). The politics of the core leader in China: Culture, institution, legitimacy, and power. Cambridge University Press. doi:10.1017/9781108635011
- Lampton, D. M. (2014). Following the leader: Ruling China, from Deng Xiaoping to Xi Jinping. University of California Press. doi:10.1525/9780520957398
- Lampton, D. M. (2015). Xi Jinping and the National Security Commission: Policy coordination and political power. Journal of Contemporary China, 24(95), 759–777. doi:10.1080/10670564.2015.1013366
- Lee, J. (2025). Limited power-sharing in a personalized regime: Xi Jinping's strategic retreat from local politics. Journal of Contemporary China, 34(152), 253–270. doi:10.1080/10670564.2024.2334898
- Lee, S. (2017). An institutional analysis of Xi Jinping's centralization of power. Journal of Contemporary China, 26(105), 325–336. doi:10.1080/10670564.2016.1245505
- Li, Z., & Manion, M. (2023). The decline of factions: The impact of a broad purge on political decision making in China. British Journal of Political Science, 53(3), 815–834. doi:10.1017/S000712342200062X
- Lynch, D., & Rosen, S. (Eds.). (2024). Chinese politics: The Xi Jinping difference. Routledge. doi:10.4324/9781003257943
- Mittelstaedt, J. C. (2023). Party-building through ideological campaigns under Xi Jinping. Asian Survey, 63(5), 716–742. doi:10.1525/as.2023.1983457
- Nesbitt-Larking, P., & Chan, A. L. (2024). The political leadership of Xi Jinping: Narratives of integrity through ordeal. Journal of Contemporary China, 33(145), 135–150. doi:10.1080/10670564.2023.2184201
- Sharp, J. (Ed.). (2013). The China renaissance: The rise of Xi Jinping and the 18th Communist Party Congress. World Scientific. doi:10.1142/8899
- Shirk, S. L. (2018). The return to personalistic rule. Journal of Democracy, 29(2), 22–36. doi:10.1353/jod.2018.0022
- Tsang, S., & Cheung, O. (2022). Has Xi Jinping made China's political system more resilient and enduring? Third World Quarterly, 43(1), 225–243. doi:10.1080/01436597.2021.2000857
- Tzeng, W.-F., & Wang, H.-H. (2026). Institutional isolation: A network analysis of Xi Jinping's inspection tour. Journal of Chinese Political Science, 31(2), 315–340. doi:10.1007/s11366-024-09893-3
- Vogel, E. (2021). The leadership of Xi Jinping: A Dengist perspective. Journal of Contemporary China, 30(131), 693–696. doi:10.1080/10670564.2021.1884955
- Wang, Z., & Zeng, J. (2016). Xi Jinping: The game changer of Chinese elite politics? Contemporary Politics, 22(4), 469–486. doi:10.1080/13569775.2016.1175098
- Zhao, S. (2023). Xi Jinping's consolidation of power at the 20th Party Congress: Implications for Chinese foreign policy. Issues & Studies, 59(2), Article 2340005. doi:10.1142/s1013251123400052
- Zhou, N. (2018). Xi Jinping's building of a new central leadership at the 19th Party Congress. East Asian Policy, 10(2), 5–15. doi:10.1142/s1793930518000132
- Zhou, N. (2020). The 19th Central Committee for Xi Jinping's "new era": Breaking conventional party rules? China: An International Journal, 18(1), 76–94. doi:10.1353/chn.2020.0005

== Ideology ==
- Brown, K., & Bērziņa-Čerenkova, U. A. (2018). Ideology in the era of Xi Jinping. Journal of Chinese Political Science, 23(3), 323–339. doi:10.1007/s11366-018-9541-z
- Düben, B. A. (2020). Xi Jinping and the end of Chinese exceptionalism. Problems of Post-Communism, 67(2), 111–128. doi:10.1080/10758216.2018.1535274
- Han, R. (2021). Cyber nationalism and regime support under Xi Jinping: The effects of the 2018 constitutional revision. Journal of Contemporary China, 30(131), 717–733. doi:10.1080/10670564.2021.1884957
- Lam, W. W.-L. (2016). Xi Jinping's ideology and statecraft. Chinese Law & Government, 48(6), 409–417. doi:10.1080/00094609.2016.1241098
- Mittelstaedt, J. C. (2026). Ideology without unity: The rhizomatic logic of Xi Jinping Thought. The China Quarterly, 266, 309–324. doi:10.1017/s0305741026102252
- Rudd, K. (2024). On Xi Jinping: How Xi's Marxist nationalism is shaping China and the world. Oxford University Press. doi:10.1093/oso/9780197766033.001.0001
- Torigian, J. (2018). Historical legacies and leaders' worldviews: Communist Party history and Xi's learned (and unlearned) lessons. China Perspectives, 2018(1–2), 7–15. doi:10.4000/chinaperspectives.7548
- Tsang, S., & Cheung, O. (2024). The political thought of Xi Jinping. Oxford University Press. doi:10.1093/oso/9780197689363.001.0001
- Wang, J. (2017). Representing Chinese nationalism/patriotism through President Xi Jinping's "Chinese Dream" discourse. Journal of Language and Politics, 16(6), 830–848. doi:10.1075/jlp.16028.wan
- Yin, L., & Flew, T. (2018). Xi Dada loves Peng Mama: Digital culture and the return of charismatic authority in China. Thesis Eleven, 144(1), 80–99. doi:10.1177/0725513618756098

== Foreign policy ==
- Cox, M. (2023). Comrades? Xi, Putin, and the challenge to the West. LSE Public Policy Review, 3(1), Article 15. doi:10.31389/lseppr.91
- Goldstein, A. (2020). China's grand strategy under Xi Jinping: Reassurance, reform, and resistance. International Security, 45(1), 164–201. doi:10.1162/isec_a_00383
- Hu, W. (2019). Xi Jinping's 'major country diplomacy': The role of leadership in foreign policy transformation. Journal of Contemporary China, 28(115), 1–14. doi:10.1080/10670564.2018.1497904
- Rudd, K. (2022). The avoidable war: The dangers of a catastrophic conflict between the US and Xi Jinping's China. PublicAffairs.
- Stevens, F. M. S. (2026). A revanchist Chinese foreign policy, with Xi Jinping's politics in command. Journal of Contemporary China, 35(160), 1742–1761. doi:10.1080/10670564.2025.2589803
- Wang, C. (2023). Xi Jinping, China, and the United States. Lexington Books. doi:10.5040/9781978738461
- Zhao, S. (2023). The dragon roars back: Transformational leaders and dynamics of Chinese foreign policy. Stanford University Press. doi:10.1515/9781503634152

== Military ==
- Saunders, P. C., Ding, A. S., Scobell, A., Yang, A. N. D., & Wuthnow, J. (Eds.). (2019). Chairman Xi remakes the PLA: Assessing Chinese military reforms. National Defense University Press.
- Wuthnow, J., & Saunders, P. C. (2025). More red but still expert: Party-army relations under Xi Jinping. Journal of Contemporary China, 34(156), 919–933. doi:10.1080/10670564.2024.2400529

== See also ==
- Anti-corruption campaign under Xi Jinping
- Family of Xi Jinping
- General secretaryship of Xi Jinping
- Generations of Chinese leadership
- Paramount leader
- The Governance of China
- Xi Jinping's cult of personality
- Xi Jinping Thought
