= Renewal in Việt Nam: Theory and Reality =

2015 book written by Vietnamese Communist Nguyễn Phú Trọng

Renewal in Viet Nam - Theory and Reality
- Author: Nguyễn Phú Trọng
- Original title: Đổi mới ở Việt Nam : lý thuyết và thực tiễn
- Cover artist: Trung Dung
- Publisher: Thế Giới Publishers
- Published: 2015
- Published in English: 2015

Renewal in Viet Nam: Theory and Reality is a political book written in 2015 by Vietnamese Communist Party general secretary Nguyễn Phú Trọng. The text is a summary of past experiences and defines the tasks and objectives of the Vietnamese revolution and the Communist Party of Vietnam. The text consists of a selection of speeches and ideological documents by Trọng, and it is his main ideological contribution to the party's ideology Ho Chi Minh Thought. The text has been compared to Chinese Communist Party general secretary Xi Jinping's political book The Governance of China.

The book is organized into three sections:

1. Renewal- The Law of and Demand for National Development
2. The Renewal Process and the CPV Leadership Role
3. Enhancing the Leadership Capacity of the CPV in the Process of Renewal
