= Campaign on Party History Learning and Education =

Chinese Communist Party campaign

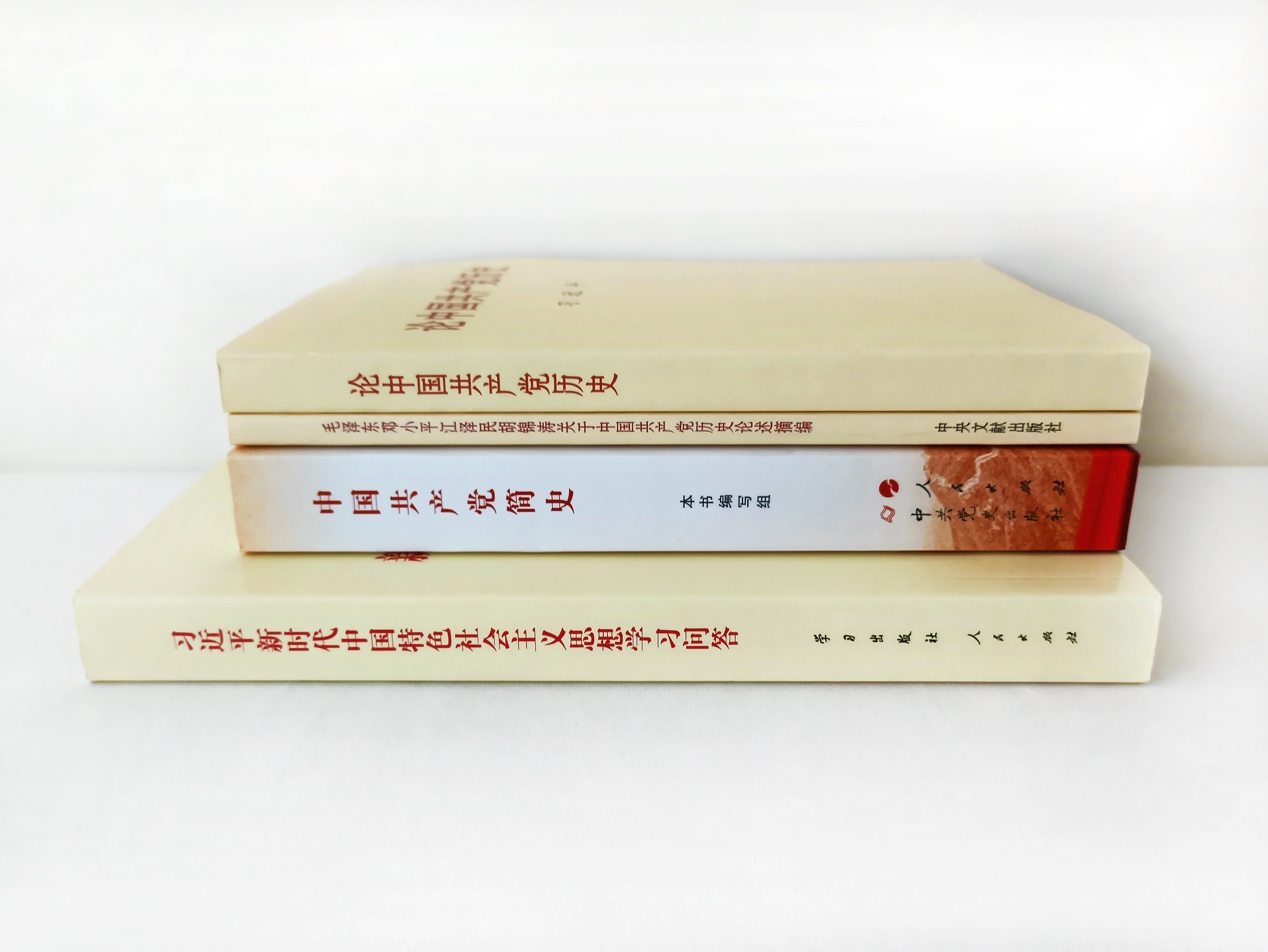
The four “designated books” for the campaign.

The Campaign on Party History Learning and Education (Chinese: 党史学习教育; pinyin: Dǎngshǐ xuéxí jiàoyù) was a campaign launched by the Chinese Communist Party (CCP) to celebrate its 100th anniversary by requiring CCP members to learn the history of the party.

== History ==
The campaign was officially launched at the Campaign on Party History Learning and Education Conference on February 20, 2021. According to the deployment of the CCP Central Committee, the campaign was mainly divided into four levels, including conducting special studies, organizing publicity and lectures, holding special democratic life meetings and organizational life meetings, and carrying out the "I do practical things for the masses" practical activities. In addition to the educational activities carried out by local governments, ministries, enterprises, and universities, the CCP Central Committee also organized the Central Propaganda Team to go to various places to hold publicity activities.

The four “designated books” for Party history education are On the History of the Communist Party of China, Selected Excerpts from Mao Zedong, Deng Xiaoping, Jiang Zemin, and Hu Jintao’s Discussions on the History of the Communist Party of China, Questions and Answers on the Study of Xi Jinping Thought on Socialism with Chinese Characteristics for a New Era, and A Concise History of the Communist Party of China. The newly edited A Brief History of the Communist Party of China uses a quarter of the book to present the history of the Party since Xi Jinping came to power.

== See also ==
- Bibliography of Xi Jinping
