= Dong Hong =

Chinese politician

- 董宏

Group Leader of 12th Central Inspection Group
- In office March 2014 – July 2015
- Preceded by: Position established
- Succeeded by: Wang Huaichen

Deputy Director of the Party Documents Research Office of CPC Central Committee
- In office March 2006 – August 2013
- Director: Teng Wensheng→Leng Rong

Personal details
- Born: November 1953 (age 72) Haicheng, Liaoning, China
- Party: Chinese Communist Party
- Education: Renmin University of China

Dong Hong (Chinese: 董宏; pinyin: Dǒng Hóng; born November 1953) is a former Chinese politician. He was investigated by China's top anti-graft agency in October 2020. He was a senior disciplinary inspector under Wang Qishan until 2017, when Wang was chief of China's top anti-corruption agency, the Central Commission for Discipline Inspection (CCDI).

== Career ==
Dong was born in Haicheng, Liaoning, in November 1953. After graduating from the Renmin University of China, he joined the Central Advisory Commission as a secretary of Bo Yibo, the then vice chairman. In 1992, he was transferred to Foshan, Guangdong and appointed assistant mayor. One year later, he was transferred back to Beijing and became deputy director and then director of the Institute of Contemporary China Studies. In 1998, he was deputy director of the Development Research Center of Guangdong Provincial People's Government. Ta Kung Pao reported in 2014 that Dong had a long-term working relationship with Wang Qishan beginning in 1998, sharing stints in Guangdong, Hainan and Beijing, and at the now defunct State Council General Office of Economic Reform. In March 2006 he was promoted to become deputy director of the Party Documents Research Office of Central Committee of the Chinese Communist Party. After Wang Qishan became Secretary of the Central Commission for Discipline Inspection, Dong became one of the group leaders of central inspection groups during Xi Jinping's first term.

== Downfall ==
On October 2, 2020, he was under investigation for "suspected serious violation of laws and party rules", according to a terse statement by the Central Commission for Discipline Inspection (CCDI), the party's internal disciplinary body, and the National Supervisory Commission, the highest anti-corruption agency of China.

On April 25, 2021, he was detained by the Supreme People's Procuratorate. On June 8, he was indicted on suspicion of accepting bribes. On August 26, he stood trial at the Intermediate People's Court of Qingdao on charges of taking bribes. The public prosecutors accused him of abusing his multiple positions between 1999 and 2020 in Guangdong, Hainan and Beijing to seek favor on behalf of certain organizations and individuals in matters of project contracting, project development and job promotions. In return, he accepted money and gifts worth more than 460 million yuan ($71 million) directly or through his relatives.

On January 28, 2022, he was sentenced to death with a two-year reprieve for bribery by Qingdao Intermediate People's Court. He was also deprived of his political rights for life, and ordered by the court to have all his personal assets confiscated and turn over all illicit gains and their interests to the state.

Party political offices
Preceded by Position established	Group Leader of 12th Central Inspection Group; 2014-2015	Succeeded by Wang Huaichen
