= Teng Wensheng =

Chinese politician

- 滕文生

Director of the Party Documents Research Office
- In office October 2002 – December 2007
- Preceded by: Pang Xianzhi
- Succeeded by: Leng Rong

Director of the Central Policy Research Office
- In office August 1997 – October 2002
- Preceded by: Wang Weicheng
- Succeeded by: Wang Huning

Personal details
- Born: October 1940 (age 85–86) Changning County, Hunan, China
- Party: Chinese Communist Party
- Education: Renmin University of China

Teng Wensheng (Chinese: 滕文生; pinyin: Téng Wénshēng; born October 1940) is a Chinese politician who served as director of the Central Policy Research Office from 1997 to 2002 and director of the Party Documents Research Office from 2002 to 2007. He was a member of the 15th and 16th Central Committee of the Chinese Communist Party. He was a member of the Standing Committee of the 11th Chinese People's Political Consultative Conference.

== Biography ==
Teng was born in the town of Guanling, Changning County (now Changning), Hunan, in October 1940. He secondary studied at Hengyang No. 1 High School. In 1964, he graduated from the Renmin University of China, where he majored in the history of the Chinese Communist Party. After University, he was assigned to the Marxist-Leninist Institute and soon was transferred to the Red Flag magazine in November of that same year. During the Cultural Revolution, he became a sent-down youth and forced to work in the fields in Shijiazhuang, capital of north China's Hebei province.

Teng joined the Chinese Communist Party (CCP) in June 1965. He worked in the People's Publishing House in December 1974, the Political Research Office of the State Council in September 1975, and the Research Office of the General Office of the CCP Central Committee in August 1979. After the Reform and Opening-Up in May 1980, he successively served as associate researcher, researcher, theory team deputy leader, and theory team leader of the Secretariat of the Chinese Communist Party. He was leader of the Publicity Group of the Office of the Central Party Consolidation Steering Committee in November 1983 and deputy secretary-general of the Central Advisory Commission in October 1987. In October 1989, he became deputy director of the Central Policy Research Office, rising to director in August 1997. He became director of the Party Documents Research Office in October 2002, and served until December 2007.

Party political offices
Preceded by Wang Weicheng	Director of the Central Policy Research Office; 1997–2002	Succeeded by Wang Huning
Preceded by Pang Xianzhi	Director of the Party Documents Research Office; 2002–2007	Succeeded by Leng Rong
