= Qu Qingshan =

Chinese politician

- 曲青山

President of the Institute of Party History and Literature
- Incumbent
- Assumed office April 2019
- Preceded by: Leng Rong

Personal details
- Born: May 1957 (age 69) Rongcheng, Shandong, China
- Party: Chinese Communist Party
- Education: Shaanxi Normal University; Central Party School of the Chinese Communist Party

Qu Qingshan (Chinese: 曲青山; pinyin: Qǔ Qīngshān; born May 1957) is a Chinese politician currently serving as president of the Institute of Party History and Literature of the Central Committee of the Chinese Communist Party. He is a member of the 19th Central Committee of the Chinese Communist Party.

== Early life ==
Qu was born in Rongcheng, Shandong, in May 1957.

== Career in Qinghai ==
During the late Cultural Revolution in December 1973, he worked as a sent-down youth in Donggou Township of Guide County in northwest China's Qinghai province. He joined the Chinese Communist Party in March 1975. After working at Qinghai Native Products Company as league secretary for three years, he was admitted to Shaanxi Normal University, where he majored in history. After graduating in 1982, he was dispatched to Qinghai Machine Tool Foundry as an official. In April 1984, he was transferred to the Lecturer Group of Theoretical Education for Cadres of the Qinghai Provincial Committee of the CCP, where he successively served as lecturer, deputy head, and head. In October 1997, he became vice president of Qinghai Academy of Social Sciences, but having held the position for only two years. He served as deputy head of the Propaganda Department of CCP Qinghai Provincial Committee in November 1999, and over a year later promoted to the head position. In May 2002, he was admitted to member of the standing committee of the CCP Qinghai Provincial Committee, the province's top authority.

== Career in Beijing ==
After working in Qinghai for 36 years, he was transferred to Beijing in 2009. He was deputy director of the Party History Research Center of the Central Committee of the Chinese Communist Party in October 2007, rising to director in January 2014. In March 2018, the Party History Research Center of the Central Committee of the Chinese Communist Party was revoked and its function was merged into the newly founded Institute of Party History and Literature of the Central Committee of the Chinese Communist Partym, he was appointed executive vice president, one year later, he rose to become president, a position at ministerial level.

Party political offices
Unknown	Head of the Propaganda Department of CCP Qinghai Provincial Committee; 2001–2009	Succeeded by Jidi Majia
Preceded by Ouyang Song	Director of the Party History Research Center of the Central Committee of the Chinese Communist Party; 2014–2018	Position revoked
Preceded by Leng Rong	President of the Institute of Party History and Literature; 2019–present	Incumbent
