= Qingdao No. 9 High School =

High school in Qingdao, China

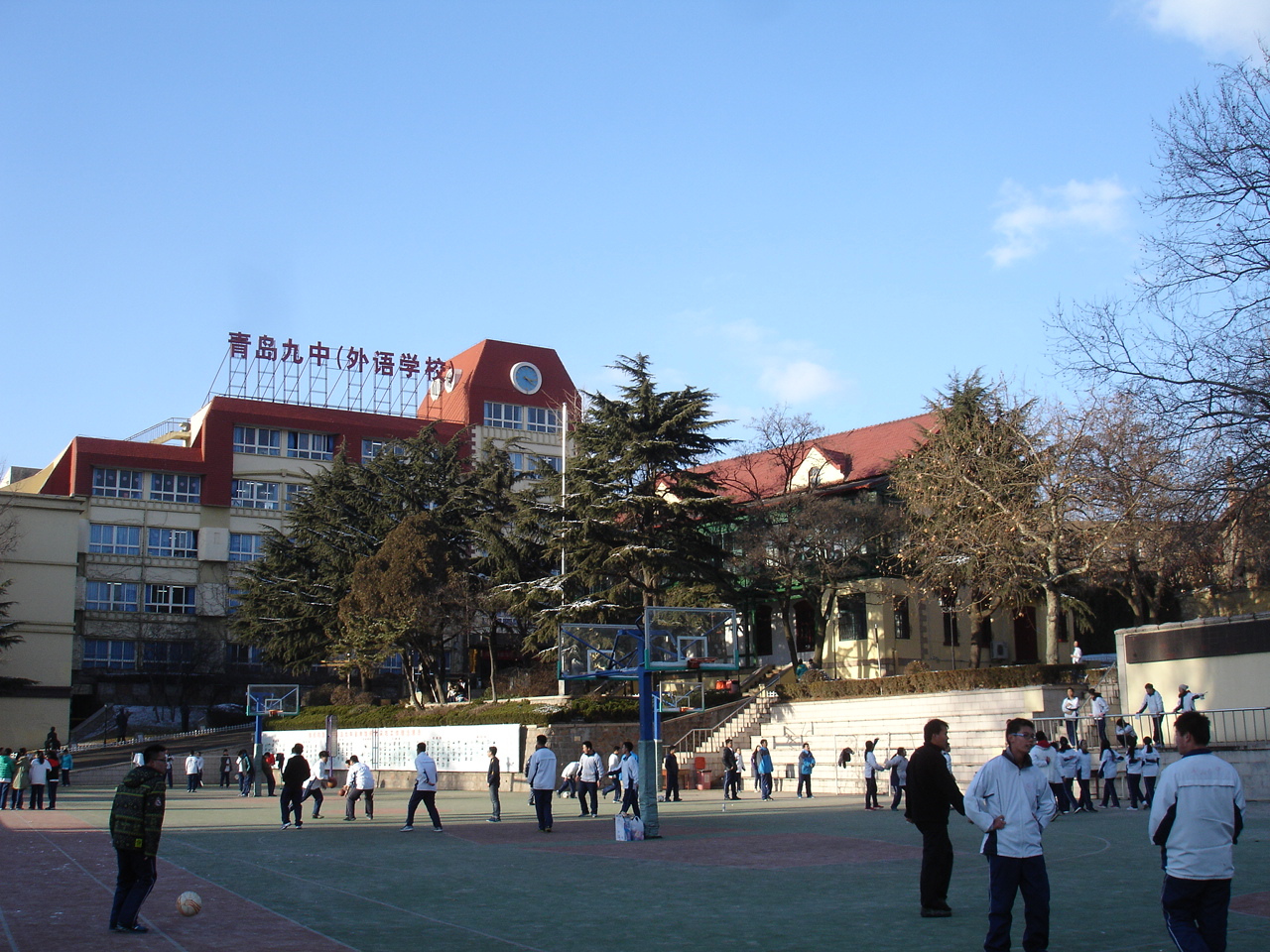
Qingdao No. 9 High School

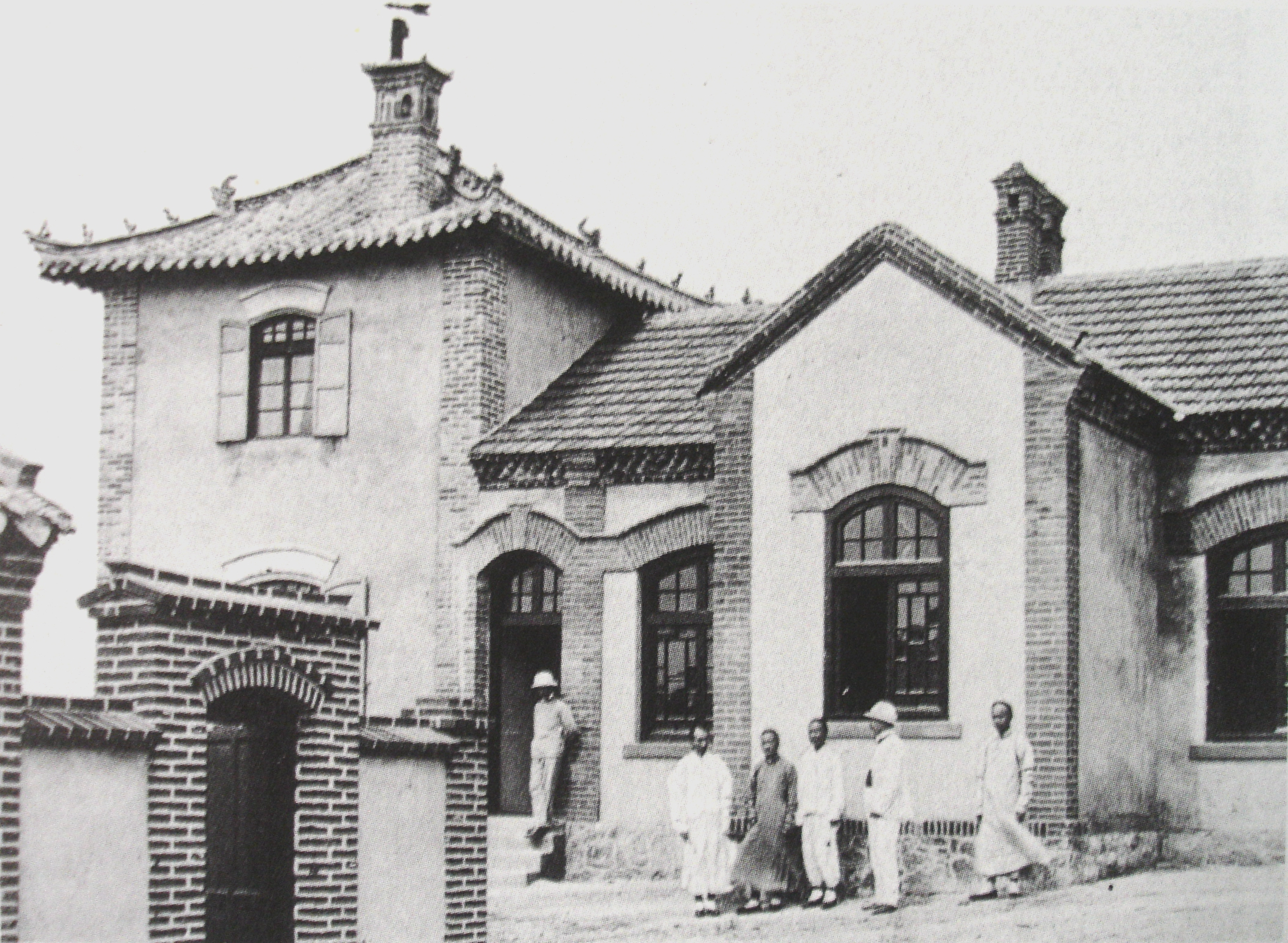
Lixian Academy in the 1910s

Qingdao No. 9 High School (simplified Chinese: 青岛第九中学; traditional Chinese: 青島第九中學), abbreviated to Qingdao 9 High (simplified Chinese: 青岛九中; traditional Chinese: 青島九中), is a secondary school in Shibei, Qingdao, China. It was established by Richard Wilhelm in 1900. Its founding name was Lixian Academy (simplified Chinese: 礼贤书院; traditional Chinese: 禮賢書院). It is also known as Qingdao Foreign Language School. The school is a key high school (重点中学).

The school was moved from Qingdao Shanghai Road to Qingdao Qixinghe road in 2016. The new place is next to the Mount Longdou, and a half of the mountain belongs to the school.

== Alumni ==
- Wang Daheng: Academician of the Chinese Academy of Sciences and the Chinese Academy of Engineering; meritorious contributor to the Two Bombs, One Satellite project
- Lin Zongtang: Former Minister of the Ministry of Aerospace Industry
- Pang Xianzhi: Director of the Central Compilation and Translation Bureau
- Qu Qinyue: Academician of the Chinese Academy of Sciences
- Chen Bingcong: Academician of the Chinese Academy of Engineering
- Gao Congjie: Academician of the Chinese Academy of Engineering
- Xie Lixin: Academician of the Chinese Academy of Engineering
- Wang Xiantang: Epigraphist; Director of the Shandong Provincial Library during the Republic of China period
- Liu Quanfa: Architect in Qingdao, one of the designers of the Former Site of the World Red Swastika Society Qingdao Branch; voluntarily served as principal of Lixian Middle School for over 20 years
- Zhang Zhenglang: Scholar of ancient Chinese writing, oracle bone and bronze inscriptions, historian, and bibliographer; Professor of History at Peking University
- Gao Xiaoyan: Calligrapher
- Bu Xiangzhi: Chess grandmaster
- Cui Wei: Film actor
- Kang Sheng: Former Vice Chairman of the Central Committee of the Chinese Communist Party
