= Bibliography of the Xi Jinping era =

- Xi Jinping in 2026
- Subject: General secretaryship of Xi Jinping
- Scope: Books, journal articles, primary sources
- Period covered: 2012 – present
- Languages: English
- Related: Bibliography of Chinese history; Bibliography of Xi Jinping

Bibliography of the Xi Jinping era is a list of English-language scholarly works on the history and politics of the People's Republic of China from 2012, when Xi Jinping became General Secretary of the Chinese Communist Party, to the present.

This bibliography contains academic-level English-language books (including translations) and journal articles. Book entries may have references to reviews published in academic journals or major newspapers when these could be considered helpful. These reference reviews also function as a resource to find other works on this subject.

Works listed here are cited in the notes or bibliographies of scholarly sources. Each is published by an academic or major trade press, written by a recognized expert, or substantially reviewed in scholarly journals; borderline cases are omitted. A selection of primary sources is included. Many of the books below carry their own bibliographies; see Further reading section for longer ones, and External links section for historical sites and museums.

Citations follow APA style. (Note: Entries are in plain text APA 7 format without templates; templates are used only for reviews and notes.) Books have citations to academic journal or mainstream published reviews when available. For books only partly about the subject, relevant chapter or section titles are given where useful and available. Translators of the original-language edition are included when possible. In cases where a title or name has appeared with more than one English spelling, the most recent published form is used and a footnote documents any earlier title under which the work appeared.

== General surveys ==
- Blanchette, J. D. (2019). China's new Red Guards: The return of radicalism and the rebirth of Mao Zedong. Oxford University Press.
- Dickson, B. J. (2021). The party and the people: Chinese politics in the 21st century. Princeton University Press.
- Economy, E. C. (2018). The third revolution: Xi Jinping and the new Chinese state. Oxford University Press.
- Fewsmith, J. (2021). Rethinking Chinese politics. Cambridge University Press.
- Gueorguiev, D. D. (2018). Dictator's shadow: Chinese elite politics under Xi Jinping. China Perspectives, 2018(1–2), 17–26. doi:10.4000/chinaperspectives.7569
- Jaros, K., & Pan, J. (2017). China's newsmakers: Official media coverage and political shifts in the Xi Jinping era. The China Quarterly, 233, 111–136. doi:10.1017/s0305741017001679
- Lam, W. W.-L. (2015). Chinese politics in the era of Xi Jinping: Renaissance, reform, or retrogression? Routledge.
- Li, C. (2016). Chinese politics in the Xi Jinping era: Reassessing collective leadership. Brookings Institution Press.
- Minzner, C. (2015). China after the reform era. Journal of Democracy, 26(3), 129–143. doi:10.1353/jod.2015.0048
- Minzner, C. (2018). End of an era: How China's authoritarian revival is undermining its rise. Oxford University Press.
- Mittelstaedt, J. C. (2026). Ideology without unity: The rhizomatic logic of Xi Jinping Thought. The China Quarterly, 266, 309–324. doi:10.1017/s0305741026102252
- Piao, L. (2023). China in 2022. Asian Survey, 63(2), 175–185. doi:10.1525/as.2023.63.2.175
- Shambaugh, D. (2016). China's future. Polity.
- Shih, V. C. (2022). Coalitions of the weak: Elite politics in China from Mao's stratagem to the rise of Xi. Cambridge University Press.
- Shirk, S. L. (2018). The return to personalistic rule. Journal of Democracy, 29(2), 22–36. doi:10.1353/jod.2018.0022
- Shirk, S. L. (2022). Overreach: How China derailed its peaceful rise. Oxford University Press.
- Tsang, S., & Cheung, O. (2021). Has Xi Jinping made China's political system more resilient and enduring? Third World Quarterly, 43(1), 225–243. doi:10.1080/01436597.2021.2000857
- Tsang, S., & Cheung, O. (2024). The political thought of Xi Jinping. Oxford University Press.

== Domestic policy ==
=== Anti-corruption ===
- Ang, Y. Y. (2020). China's gilded age: The paradox of economic boom and vast corruption. Cambridge University Press.
- Feldman, S. P. (2023). Xi Jinping's anticorruption campaign: The politics of revenge. Routledge.
- Li, L. (2018). Politics of anticorruption in China: Paradigm change of the Party's disciplinary regime 2012–2017. Journal of Contemporary China, 28(115), 47–63. doi:10.1080/10670564.2018.1497911
- Liao, X., & Tsai, W.-H. (2020). Strengthening China's powerful Commission for Discipline Inspection under Xi Jinping, with a case study at the county level. The China Journal, 84, 29–50. doi:10.1086/708610
- Manion, M. (2016). Taking China's anticorruption campaign seriously. Economic and Political Studies, 4(1), 3–18. doi:10.1080/20954816.2016.1152094
- Pei, M. (2016). China's crony capitalism: The dynamics of regime decay. Harvard University Press.
- Wang, Y., & Dickson, B. J. (2021). How corruption investigations undermine regime support: Evidence from China. Political Science Research and Methods, 10(1), 33–48. doi:10.1017/psrm.2021.27
- Wedeman, A. (2012). Double paradox: Rapid growth and rising corruption in China. Cornell University Press.
- Yuen, S. (2014). Disciplining the party: Xi Jinping's anti-corruption campaign and its limits. China Perspectives, 2014(3), 41–47. doi:10.4000/chinaperspectives.6542
- Zhu, J., & Zhang, D. (2016). Weapons of the powerful: Authoritarian elite competition and politicized anticorruption in China. Comparative Political Studies, 50(9), 1186–1220. doi:10.1177/0010414016672234

=== Economy ===
- Bown, C. P. (2021). The US–China trade war and Phase One agreement. Journal of Policy Modeling, 43(4), 805–843. doi:10.1016/j.jpolmod.2021.02.009
- Chen, Z., He, Z., & Liu, C. (2020). The financing of local government in China: Stimulus loan wanes and shadow banking waxes. Journal of Financial Economics, 137(1), 42–71. doi:10.1016/j.jfineco.2019.07.009
- Klein, M. C., & Pettis, M. (2020). Trade wars are class wars: How rising inequality distorts the global economy and threatens international peace. Yale University Press.
- Kroeber, A. R. (2016). China's economy: What everyone needs to know. Oxford University Press.
- Lardy, N. R. (2014). Markets over Mao: The rise of private business in China. Peterson Institute for International Economics.
- Lardy, N. R. (2019). The state strikes back: The end of economic reform in China? Peterson Institute for International Economics.
- Naughton, B. (2018). The Chinese economy: Adaptation and growth (2nd ed.). MIT Press.
- Pearson, M. M., Rithmire, M., & Tsai, K. S. (2022). China's party-state capitalism and international backlash: From interdependence to insecurity. International Security, 47(2), 135–176. doi:10.1162/isec_a_00447
- Pettis, M. (2013). The great rebalancing: Trade, conflict, and the perilous road ahead for the world economy. Princeton University Press.
- Rithmire, M. (2023). Precarious ties: Business and the state in authoritarian Asia. Oxford University Press.
- Rogoff, K., & Yang, Y. (2021). Has China's housing production peaked? China & World Economy, 29(1), 1–31. doi:10.1111/cwe.12360

=== Legal ===
- Creemers, R., & Trevaskes, S. (Eds.). (2021). Law and the party in China: Ideology and organisation. Cambridge University Press.
- Deng, J. (2018). The National Supervision Commission: A new anti-corruption model in China. International Journal of Law, Crime and Justice, 52, 58–73. doi:10.1016/j.ijlcj.2017.09.005
- Fu, H. (2018). The July 9th (709) crackdown on human rights lawyers: Legal advocacy in an authoritarian state. Journal of Contemporary China, 27(112), 554–568. doi:10.1080/10670564.2018.1433491
- Gallagher, M. E. (2017). Authoritarian legality in China: Law, workers, and the state. Cambridge University Press.
- Holbig, H. (2018). China after reform: The ideological, constitutional, and organisational makings of a new era. Journal of Current Chinese Affairs, 47(3), 187–207. doi:10.1177/186810261804700307
- Liu, S., & Halliday, T. C. (2016). Criminal defense in China: The politics of lawyers at work. Cambridge University Press.
- Ng, K. H., & He, X. (2017). Embedded courts: Judicial decision-making in China. Cambridge University Press.
- Pils, E. (2018). The Party's turn to public repression: An analysis of the '709' crackdown on human rights lawyers in China. China Law and Society Review, 3(1), 1–48. doi:10.1163/25427466-00301001
- Sapio, F. (2021). The National Supervision Commission: A "subaltern history". Modern China, 48(4), 754–784. doi:10.1177/00977004211049489
- Snape, H. (2024). The rise of Party law: Rewiring the Party, recalibrating the Party-state relationship. The China Journal, 92, 1–26. doi:10.1086/730530

=== Environment ===
- Ahlers, A. L., & Shen, Y. (2017). Breathe easy? Local nuances of authoritarian environmentalism in China's battle against air pollution. The China Quarterly, 234, 299–319. doi:10.1017/s0305741017001370
- Davidson, M., Karplus, V. J., Zhang, D., & Zhang, X. (2021). Policies and institutions to support carbon neutrality in China by 2060. Economics of Energy & Environmental Policy, 10(2). doi:10.5547/2160-5890.10.2.mdav
- Geall, S., & Ely, A. (2018). Narratives and pathways towards an ecological civilization in contemporary China. The China Quarterly, 236, 1175–1196. doi:10.1017/s0305741018001315
- Jia, K., & Chen, S. (2019). Could campaign-style enforcement improve environmental performance? Evidence from China's central environmental protection inspection. Journal of Environmental Management, 245, 282–290. doi:10.1016/j.jenvman.2019.05.114
- Kostka, G., & Zhang, C. (2018). Tightening the grip: Environmental governance under Xi Jinping. Environmental Politics, 27(5), 769–781. doi:10.1080/09644016.2018.1491116
- Li, Y., & Shapiro, J. (2020). China goes green: Coercive environmentalism for a troubled planet. Polity.
- Lora-Wainwright, A. (2017). Resigned activism: Living with pollution in rural China. MIT Press.
- van Rooij, B., Zhu, Q., Li, N., & Wang, Q. (2017). Centralizing trends and pollution law enforcement in China. The China Quarterly, 231, 583–606. doi:10.1017/s0305741017000935
- Wong, C., & Karplus, V. J. (2017). China's war on air pollution: Can existing governance structures support new ambitions? The China Quarterly, 231, 662–684. doi:10.1017/s0305741017000947
- Wong, N. W. M. (2016). Environmental protests and NIMBY activism: Local politics and waste management in Beijing and Guangzhou. China Information, 30(2), 143–164. doi:10.1177/0920203x16641550

=== Repression ===
- Chin, J., & Lin, L. (2022). Surveillance state: Inside China's quest to launch a new era of social control. St. Martin's Press.
- Fu, D. (2018). Mobilizing without the masses: Control and contention in China. Cambridge University Press.
- Fu, D., & Distelhorst, G. (2018). Grassroots participation and repression under Hu Jintao and Xi Jinping. The China Journal, 79, 100–122. doi:10.1086/694299
- King, G., Pan, J., & Roberts, M. E. (2013). How censorship in China allows government criticism but silences collective expression. American Political Science Review, 107(2), 326–343. doi:10.1017/s0003055413000014
- King, G., Pan, J., & Roberts, M. E. (2017). How the Chinese government fabricates social media posts for strategic distraction, not engaged argument. American Political Science Review, 111(3), 484–501. doi:10.1017/s0003055417000144
- Pan, J. (2020). Welfare for autocrats: How social assistance in China cares for its rulers. Oxford University Press.
- Pei, M. (2024). The sentinel state: Surveillance and the survival of dictatorship in China. Harvard University Press.
- Pils, E. (2018). Human rights in China: A social practice in the shadows of authoritarianism. Polity.
- Repnikova, M. (2017). Media politics in China: Improvising power under authoritarianism. Cambridge University Press.
- Repnikova, M., & Fang, K. (2019). Digital media experiments in China: "Revolutionizing" persuasion under Xi Jinping. The China Quarterly, 239, 679–701. doi:10.1017/s0305741019000316
- Roberts, M. E. (2018). Censored: Distraction and diversion inside China's Great Firewall. Princeton University Press.
- Strittmatter, K. (2019). We have been harmonised: Life in China's surveillance state (R. Martin, Trans.). Old Street Publishing. (Original work published 2018)
- Teets, J. C. (2014). Civil society under authoritarianism: The China model. Cambridge University Press.
- Xiao, Q. (2019). The road to digital unfreedom: President Xi's surveillance state. Journal of Democracy, 30(1), 53–67. doi:10.1353/jod.2019.0004
- Xu, X. (2020). To repress or to co-opt? Authoritarian control in the age of digital surveillance. American Journal of Political Science, 65(2), 309–325. doi:10.1111/ajps.12514

=== Hong Kong ===
- Chan, C., & de Londras, F. (Eds.). (2020). China's national security: Endangering Hong Kong's rule of law? Hart Publishing.
- Cheng, E. W., Lee, F. L. F., Yuen, S., & Tang, G. (2022). Total mobilization from below: Hong Kong's freedom summer. The China Quarterly, 251, 629–659. doi:10.1017/s0305741022000236
- Chopra, S., & Pils, E. (2022). The Hong Kong National Security Law and the struggle over rule of law and democracy in Hong Kong. Federal Law Review, 50(3), 292–313. doi:10.1177/0067205x221107410
- Dapiran, A. (2020). City on fire: The fight for Hong Kong. Scribe.
- Davis, M. C. (2020). Making Hong Kong China: The rollback of human rights and the rule of law. Association for Asian Studies.
- Davis, M. C. (2024). Freedom undone: The assault on liberal values and institutions in Hong Kong. Association for Asian Studies.
- Ho, M.-s. (2019). Challenging Beijing's mandate of heaven: Taiwan's Sunflower Movement and Hong Kong's Umbrella Movement. Temple University Press.
- Hui, V. T.-b. (2020). Crackdown: Hong Kong faces Tiananmen 2.0. Journal of Democracy, 31(4), 122–137. doi:10.1353/jod.2020.0060
- Hung, H.-f. (2022). City on the edge: Hong Kong under Chinese rule. Cambridge University Press.
- Karmazin, A. (2023). The Hong Kong National Security Law and the changing character of rule in the China–Hong Kong relationship. China Report, 59(1), 25–39. doi:10.1177/00094455231155205
- Kwong, Y.-H. (2025). Electoral overhaul under the principle of "patriots governing Hong Kong": Implications for pro-China governing coalition re-building. Problems of Post-Communism, 72(6), 583–596. doi:10.1080/10758216.2025.2483326
- Lee, F. L. F., & Chan, J. M. (2018). Media and protest logics in the digital era: The Umbrella Movement in Hong Kong. Oxford University Press.
- Lee, F. L. F. (2019). Solidarity in the Anti-Extradition Bill movement in Hong Kong. Critical Asian Studies, 52(1), 18–32. doi:10.1080/14672715.2020.1700629
- Lee, F. L. F. (2023). Beyond self-censorship: Hong Kong's journalistic risk culture under the National Security Law. The China Journal, 90, 129–153. doi:10.1086/725536
- Lee, F. L. F. (2025). Pro-democracy contention in Hong Kong: Relational dynamics between the Umbrella Movement and the anti-extradition protests. SUNY Press.
- Lim, L. (2022). Indelible city: Dispossession and defiance in Hong Kong. Riverhead Books.
- Lo, S. S.-H., Hung, S. C.-F., & Loo, J. H.-C. (2021). The dynamics of peaceful and violent protests in Hong Kong: The anti-extradition movement. Springer.
- Ma, N., & Cheng, E. W. (Eds.). (2019). The Umbrella Movement: Civil resistance and contentious space in Hong Kong. Amsterdam University Press.
- Ortmann, S. (2015). The Umbrella Movement and Hong Kong's protracted democratization process. Asian Affairs, 46(1), 32–50. doi:10.1080/03068374.2014.994957
- Veg, S. (2017). The rise of "localism" and civic identity in post-handover Hong Kong: Questioning the Chinese nation-state. The China Quarterly, 230, 323–347. doi:10.1017/s0305741017000571

=== COVID-19 ===
- Guan, Y., Guang, L., Li, L., & Liu, Y. (2024). The rally effect of the COVID-19 pandemic and the White Paper Movement in China. Journal of Contemporary China, 34(151), 117–128. doi:10.1080/10670564.2024.2356863
- Huang, Y. (2025). Pandemic and power: The impact of COVID-19 on China's ascendancy. The China Journal, 93, 23–50. doi:10.1086/731980
- Keng, S., Zhong, L., & Xie, F. (2023). Why did China's zero-COVID policy persist? Decision urgency, regime type, and political opportunity structures. Journal of Contemporary China, 33(146), 206–222. doi:10.1080/10670564.2023.2193143
- Loh, D. M. H., & Loke, B. (2023). COVID-19 and the international politics of blame: Assessing China's crisis (mis)management practices. The China Quarterly, 257, 169–185. doi:10.1017/s0305741023000796
- Long, Y., & Luo, W. (2025). Affective lockdown: Administrative chaos and informal repairing in urban China during COVID-19. The China Journal, 93, 51–75. doi:10.1086/731981
- Mei, C. (2020). Policy style, consistency and the effectiveness of the policy mix in China's fight against COVID-19. Policy and Society, 39(3), 309–325. doi:10.1080/14494035.2020.1787627
- Yang, D. L. (2024). Wuhan: How the COVID-19 outbreak in China spiraled out of control. Oxford University Press.
- Yang, G. (2022). The Wuhan lockdown. Columbia University Press.
- Yang, Z., Zhu, G., Li, L. C., & Sheng, Y. (2021). Services and surveillance during the pandemic lockdown: Residents' committees in Wuhan and Beijing. China Information, 35(3), 420–440. doi:10.1177/0920203x211012822
- Zhao, S. X., Yan, B., Liu, Y., Chen, C., & Chen, Y. (2025). Between zero Covid and 'live with Covid': Comparing pandemic control policies in China, the UK, Hong Kong and Singapore. Journal of Contemporary China, 35(158), 1353–1374. doi:10.1080/10670564.2025.2455572

== Military ==
- Cheung, T. M. (2022). Innovate to dominate: The rise of the Chinese techno-security state. Cornell University Press.
- Cunningham, F. S., & Fravel, M. T. (2015). Assuring assured retaliation: China's nuclear posture and U.S.-China strategic stability. International Security, 40(2), 7–50. doi:10.1162/isec_a_00215
- Fravel, M. T. (2018). Shifts in warfare and party unity: Explaining China's changes in military strategy. International Security, 42(3), 37–83. doi:10.1162/isec_a_00304
- Fravel, M. T. (2019). Active defense: China's military strategy since 1949. Princeton University Press.
- Kou, C.-w. (2017). Xi Jinping in command: Solving the principal–agent problem in CCP–PLA relations? The China Quarterly, 232, 866–885. doi:10.1017/s0305741017001321
- Mastro, O. S. (2024). Upstart: How China became a great power. Oxford University Press.
- Saunders, P. C., Ding, A. S., Scobell, A., Yang, A. N. D., & Wuthnow, J. (Eds.). (2019). Chairman Xi remakes the PLA: Assessing Chinese military reforms. National Defense University Press.
- Wuthnow, J. (2017). A brave new world for Chinese joint operations. Journal of Strategic Studies, 40(1–2), 169–195. doi:10.1080/01402390.2016.1276012
- Wuthnow, J., & Fravel, M. T. (2022). China's military strategy for a 'new era': Some change, more continuity, and tantalizing hints. Journal of Strategic Studies, 46(6–7), 1149–1184. doi:10.1080/01402390.2022.2043850
- You, J. (2015). China's military transformation: Politics and war preparation. Polity.

== Society ==
- Binah-Pollak, A. (2024). "There is only one childhood": A new interpretation of China's "crackdown" on education companies. Modern China, 51(2), 205–232. doi:10.1177/00977004241277957
- Friedman, E. (2022). The urbanization of people: The politics of development, labor markets, and schooling in the Chinese city. Columbia University Press.
- Huang, X. (2020). Social protection under authoritarianism: Health politics and policy in China. Oxford University Press.
- Lei, Y.-W. (2021). Delivering solidarity: Platform architecture and collective contention in China's platform economy. American Sociological Review, 86(2), 279–309. doi:10.1177/0003122420979980
- Rozelle, S., & Hell, N. (2020). Invisible China: How the urban-rural divide threatens China's rise. University of Chicago Press.
- Sun, P. (2019). Your order, their labor: An exploration of algorithms and laboring on food delivery platforms in China. Chinese Journal of Communication, 12(3), 308–323. doi:10.1080/17544750.2019.1583676
- Yao, J., & Wong, C. (2026). Who will deliver common prosperity in China? A look at policy instruments. The China Journal, 96, 28–63. doi:10.1086/741565
- Zeng, Q. (2019). Managed campaign and bureaucratic institutions in China: Evidence from the targeted poverty alleviation program. Journal of Contemporary China, 29(123), 400–415. doi:10.1080/10670564.2019.1645489
- Zeng, Y., & Hesketh, T. (2016). The effects of China's universal two-child policy. The Lancet, 388(10054), 1930–1938. doi:10.1016/s0140-6736(16)31405-2
- Zhan, S. (2017). Hukou reform and land politics in China: Rise of a tripartite alliance. The China Journal, 78, 25–49. doi:10.1086/690622

=== Technology ===
- Creemers, R. (2022). China's emerging data protection framework. Journal of Cybersecurity, 8(1). doi:10.1093/cybsec/tyac011
- Kostka, G. (2019). China's social credit systems and public opinion: Explaining high levels of approval. New Media & Society, 21(7), 1565–1593. doi:10.1177/1461444819826402
- Lei, Y.-W. (2023). The gilded cage: Technology, development, and state capitalism in China. Princeton University Press.
- Miller, C. (2022). Chip war: The fight for the world's most critical technology. Simon & Schuster.
- Qiao-Franco, G., & Zhu, R. (2022). China's artificial intelligence ethics: Policy development in an emergent community of practice. Journal of Contemporary China, 33(146), 189–205. doi:10.1080/10670564.2022.2153016
- Roberts, H., Cowls, J., Morley, J., Taddeo, M., Wang, V., & Floridi, L. (2020). The Chinese approach to artificial intelligence: An analysis of policy, ethics, and regulation. AI & Society, 36(1), 59–77. doi:10.1007/s00146-020-00992-2
- Tsai, W.-H., Wang, H.-H., & Lin, R. (2021). Hobbling Big Brother: Top-level design and local discretion in China's social credit system. The China Journal, 86, 1–20. doi:10.1086/714492
- von Blomberg, M., & Yu, H. (2023). Shaming the untrustworthy and paths to relief in China's social credit system. Modern China, 49(6), 744–781. doi:10.1177/00977004231152138
- Zeng, J. (2022). Artificial intelligence with Chinese characteristics: National strategy, security and authoritarian governance. Palgrave Macmillan.
- Zhang, A. H. (2024). High wire: How China regulates big tech and governs its economy. Oxford University Press.

=== Religion ===
- Chang, K.-m. (2018). New wine in old bottles: Sinicisation and state regulation of religion in China. China Perspectives, 2018(1–2), 37–44. doi:10.4000/chinaperspectives.7636
- Erie, M. S. (2016). China and Islam: The Prophet, the Party, and law. Cambridge University Press.
- Johnson, I. (2017). The souls of China: The return of religion after Mao. Pantheon.
- McLeister, M. (2018). Chinese Protestant reactions to the Zhejiang "Three Rectifications, One Demolition" campaign. Review of Religion and Chinese Society, 5(1), 76–100. doi:10.1163/22143955-00501005
- Mok, C. W. J. (2020). Sino-Vatican rapprochement: An assessment of Pope Francis' realpolitik and the provisional agreement on the appointment of bishops. Journal of Contemporary China, 30(129), 386–401. doi:10.1080/10670564.2020.1827352
- Mok, C. W. J. (2024). (En)countering state-led sinicization: Critical discursive responses from Roman Catholics in China. The China Quarterly, 261, 162–182. doi:10.1017/s030574102400078x
- Powers, J. (2016). The Buddha party: How the People's Republic of China works to define and control Tibetan Buddhism. Oxford University Press.
- Reny, M.-E. (2018). Compliant defiance: Informality and survival among Protestant house churches in China. Journal of Contemporary China, 27(111), 472–485. doi:10.1080/10670564.2018.1410985
- Stroup, D. R. (2022). Pure and true: The everyday politics of ethnicity for China's Hui Muslims. University of Washington Press.
- Sun, Y. (2022). "Islamization" and crackdown in Ningxia: Another Xinjiang? Journal of Contemporary China, 32(144), 984–999. doi:10.1080/10670564.2022.2138699
- Vala, C. T. (2018). The politics of Protestant churches and the party-state in China: God above party? Routledge.

=== Gender and sexuality ===
- Bao, H. (2018). Queer comrades: Gay identity and tongzhi activism in postsocialist China. NIAS Press.
- Hong, T. (2022). From zhiqing to "mothers of tongzhi children": Linkages between the socialist past, reflective present, and LGBT future in China. China Perspectives, 2022(1), 21–31. doi:10.4000/chinaperspectives.13393
- Hong Fincher, L. (2018). Betraying Big Brother: The feminist awakening in China. Verso.
- Lin, Z., & Yang, L. (2019). Individual and collective empowerment: Women's voices in the #MeToo movement in China. Asian Journal of Women's Studies, 25(1), 117–131. doi:10.1080/12259276.2019.1573002
- Wang, Q. (2018). Young feminist activists in present-day China: A new feminist generation? China Perspectives, 2018(3), 59–68. doi:10.4000/chinaperspectives.8165
- Wang, Z. (2015). Detention of the Feminist Five in China. Feminist Studies, 41(2), 476–482. doi:10.1353/fem.2015.0001
- Wei, W., & Yan, Y. (2021). Rainbow parents and the familial model of tongzhi (LGBT) activism in contemporary China. Chinese Sociological Review, 53(5), 451–472. doi:10.1080/21620555.2021.1981129
- Wu, A. X., & Dong, Y. (2019). What is made-in-China feminism(s)? Gender discontent and class friction in post-socialist China. Critical Asian Studies, 51(4), 471–492. doi:10.1080/14672715.2019.1656538
- Xue, A. W., & Rose, K. (2022). Weibo feminism: Expression, activism, and social media in China. Bloomsbury Academic.
- Zeng, J. (2020). #MeToo as connective action: A study of the anti-sexual violence and anti-sexual harassment campaign on Chinese social media in 2018. Journalism Practice, 14(2), 171–190. doi:10.1080/17512786.2019.1706622
- Zhou, Y. (2018). The dual demands: Gender equity and fertility intentions after the one-child policy. Journal of Contemporary China, 28(117), 367–384. doi:10.1080/10670564.2018.1542219

== Nationalities ==
=== Nationalism and propaganda ===
- Brady, A.-M. (2016). Plus ça change?: Media control under Xi Jinping. Problems of Post-Communism, 64(3–4), 128–140. doi:10.1080/10758216.2016.1197779
- Chen, T. C. (2022). The making of a neo-propaganda state: China's social media under Xi Jinping. Brill.
- Fang, K., & Repnikova, M. (2017). Demystifying "Little Pink": The creation and evolution of a gendered label for nationalistic activists in China. New Media & Society, 20(6), 2162–2185. doi:10.1177/1461444817731923
- Huang, H. (2018). The pathology of hard propaganda. The Journal of Politics, 80(3), 1034–1038. doi:10.1086/696863
- Martin, P. (2021). China's civilian army: The making of wolf warrior diplomacy. Oxford University Press.
- Mattingly, D. C., & Yao, E. (2022). How soft propaganda persuades. Comparative Political Studies, 55(9), 1569–1594. doi:10.1177/00104140211047403
- Schneider, F. (2018). China's digital nationalism. Oxford University Press.
- Sullivan, J., & Wang, W. (2022). China's "wolf warrior diplomacy": The interaction of formal diplomacy and cyber-nationalism. Journal of Current Chinese Affairs, 52(1), 68–88. doi:10.1177/18681026221079841
- Suzuki, T. (2019). China's United Front work in the Xi Jinping era – institutional developments and activities. Journal of Contemporary East Asia Studies, 8(1), 83–98. doi:10.1080/24761028.2019.1627714
- Yang, P., & Tang, L. (2018). "Positive energy": Hegemonic intervention and online media discourse in China's Xi Jinping era. China: An International Journal, 16(1), 1–22. doi:10.1353/chn.2018.0000

=== Ethnic policy ===
- Bulag, U. E. (2021). Minority nationalities as Frankenstein's monsters? Reshaping "the Chinese nation" and China's quest to become a "normal country". The China Journal, 86, 46–67. doi:10.1086/714737
- Elliott, M. (2015). The case of the missing indigene: Debate over a "second-generation" ethnic policy. The China Journal, 73, 186–213. doi:10.1086/679274
- Han, E. (2013). Contestation and adaptation: The politics of national identity in China. Oxford University Press.
- Leibold, J., & Chen, Y. (Eds.). (2014). Minority education in China: Balancing unity and diversity in an era of critical pluralism. Hong Kong University Press.
- Leibold, J. (2018). Interior ethnic minority boarding schools: China's bold and unpredictable educational experiment. Asian Studies Review, 43(1), 3–15. doi:10.1080/10357823.2018.1548572
- Ma, R. (2014). Reflections on the debate on China's ethnic policy: My reform proposals and their critics. Asian Ethnicity, 15(2), 237–246. doi:10.1080/14631369.2013.868205
- Tsakhirmaa, S. (2022). Comparative ethnic territorially-based autonomy in Xinjiang, Tibet, Inner Mongolia and Ningxia of China 2010–2015: An analytical framework. Journal of Contemporary China, 31(138), 949–976. doi:10.1080/10670564.2022.2031001
- Zang, X. (2015). Ethnicity in China: A critical introduction. Polity.
- Zhao, T., & Leibold, J. (2019). Ethnic governance under Xi Jinping: The centrality of the United Front Work Department & its implications. Journal of Contemporary China, 29(124), 487–502. doi:10.1080/10670564.2019.1677359

=== Tibet ===
- Grant, A. (2018). Hyperbuilding the civilized city: Ethnicity and marginalization in eastern Tibet. Critical Asian Studies, 50(4), 537–555. doi:10.1080/14672715.2018.1514270
- Hillman, B., & Tuttle, G. (Eds.). (2016). Ethnic conflict and protest in Tibet and Xinjiang: Unrest in China's West. Columbia University Press.
- Leibold, J., & Dorjee, T. (2023). Learning to be Chinese: Colonial-style boarding schools on the Tibetan plateau. Comparative Education, 60(1), 118–137. doi:10.1080/03050068.2023.2250969
- Makley, C. (2015). The sociopolitical lives of dead bodies: Tibetan self-immolation protest as mass media. Cultural Anthropology, 30(3), 448–476. doi:10.14506/ca30.3.05
- Makley, C. (2018). The battle for fortune: State-led development, personhood, and power among Tibetans in China. Cornell University Press.
- Ptáčková, J. (2020). Exile from the grasslands: Tibetan herders and Chinese development projects. University of Washington Press.
- Topgyal, T. (2013). Identity insecurity and the Tibetan resistance against China. Pacific Affairs, 86(3), 515–538. doi:10.5509/2013863515
- Topgyal, T. (2016). China and Tibet: The perils of insecurity. Hurst.
- Yang, M. (2017). Learning to be safe citizens: State-run boarding schools and the dynamics of Tibetan identity. Citizenship Studies, 21(7), 824–841. doi:10.1080/13621025.2017.1353738
- Yeh, E. T. (2013). Taming Tibet: Landscape transformation and the gift of Chinese development. Cornell University Press.

=== Xinjiang ===
- Byler, D. (2021). In the camps: China's high-tech penal colony. Columbia Global Reports.
- Byler, D. (2022). Terror capitalism: Uyghur dispossession and masculinity in a Chinese city. Duke University Press.
- Clarke, M. (Ed.). (2022). The Xinjiang emergency: Exploring the causes and consequences of China's mass detention of Uyghurs. Manchester University Press.
- Greitens, S. C., Lee, M., & Yazici, E. (2020). Counterterrorism and preventive repression: China's changing strategy in Xinjiang. International Security, 44(3), 9–47. doi:10.1162/isec_a_00368
- Leibold, J. (2019). Surveillance in China's Xinjiang region: Ethnic sorting, coercion, and inducement. Journal of Contemporary China, 29(121), 46–60. doi:10.1080/10670564.2019.1621529
- Lemon, E., Jardine, B., & Hall, N. (2022). Globalizing minority persecution: China's transnational repression of the Uyghurs. Globalizations, 20(4), 564–580. doi:10.1080/14747731.2022.2135944
- Millward, J. A. (2021). Eurasian crossroads: A history of Xinjiang (Rev. ed.). Columbia University Press.
- Roberts, S. R. (2020). The war on the Uyghurs: China's internal campaign against a Muslim minority. Princeton University Press.
- Smith Finley, J. (2020). Why scholars and activists increasingly fear a Uyghur genocide in Xinjiang. Journal of Genocide Research, 23(3), 348–370. doi:10.1080/14623528.2020.1848109
- Tobin, D. (2020). Securing China's northwest frontier: Identity and insecurity in Xinjiang. Cambridge University Press.
- Zenz, A. (2018). 'Thoroughly reforming them towards a healthy heart attitude': China's political re-education campaign in Xinjiang. Central Asian Survey, 38(1), 102–128. doi:10.1080/02634937.2018.1507997
- Zenz, A. (2022). The Xinjiang Police Files: Re-education camp security and political paranoia in the Xinjiang Uyghur Autonomous Region. Journal of the European Association for Chinese Studies, 3, 263–311. doi:10.25365/jeacs.2022.3.zenz
- Zenz, A., & Leibold, J. (2019). Securitizing Xinjiang: Police recruitment, informal policing and ethnic minority co-optation. The China Quarterly, 242, 324–348. doi:10.1017/s0305741019000778

== Foreign policy ==
=== Belt and Road Initiative ===
- Brautigam, D. (2019). A critical look at Chinese 'debt-trap diplomacy': The rise of a meme. Area Development and Policy, 5(1), 1–14. doi:10.1080/23792949.2019.1689828
- Gelpern, A., Horn, S., Morris, S., Parks, B., & Trebesch, C. (2022). How China lends: A rare look into 100 debt contracts with foreign governments. Economic Policy, 38(114), 345–416. doi:10.1093/epolic/eiac054
- Hillman, J. E. (2020). The emperor's new road: China and the project of the century. Yale University Press.
- Jones, L., & Zeng, J. (2019). Understanding China's 'Belt and Road Initiative': Beyond 'grand strategy' to a state transformation analysis. Third World Quarterly, 40(8), 1415–1439. doi:10.1080/01436597.2018.1559046
- Kuik, C.-C. (2021). Asymmetry and authority: Theorizing Southeast Asian responses to China's Belt and Road Initiative. Asian Perspective, 45(2), 255–276. doi:10.1353/apr.2021.0000
- Lampton, D. M., Ho, S., & Kuik, C.-C. (2020). Rivers of iron: Railroads and Chinese power in Southeast Asia. University of California Press.
- Narins, T. P., & Agnew, J. (2019). Missing from the map: Chinese exceptionalism, sovereignty regimes and the Belt Road Initiative. Geopolitics, 25(4), 809–837. doi:10.1080/14650045.2019.1601082
- Rolland, N. (2017). China's Eurasian century? Political and strategic implications of the Belt and Road Initiative. National Bureau of Asian Research.
- Summers, T. (2016). China's 'New Silk Roads': Sub-national regions and networks of global political economy. Third World Quarterly, 37(9), 1628–1643. doi:10.1080/01436597.2016.1153415
- Ye, M. (2020). The Belt Road and beyond: State-mobilized globalization in China, 1998–2018. Cambridge University Press.

=== Pacific ===
- Clarke, M., & Feeny, S. (2019). The dragon versus the kangaroo: Perceptions of Chinese and Australian influence and development assistance in Vanuatu. Australian Journal of Political Science, 54(3), 334–354. doi:10.1080/10361146.2019.1617237
- Ferguson, V. A., Waldron, S., & Lim, D. J. (2022). Market adjustments to import sanctions: Lessons from Chinese restrictions on Australian trade, 2020–21. Review of International Political Economy, 30(4), 1255–1281. doi:10.1080/09692290.2022.2090019
- Hameiri, S. (2015). China's 'charm offensive' in the Pacific and Australia's regional order. The Pacific Review, 28(5), 631–654. doi:10.1080/09512748.2015.1012542
- Lee, K., & Bruhl, E. (2024). The deterioration of Australia–China relations: What went wrong? Australian Journal of International Affairs, 78(3), 326–347. doi:10.1080/10357718.2024.2337884
- Lim, D. J., & Colnaghi, W. B. (2024). Strategically (in)secure and economically (in)vulnerable: Australia, New Zealand, and their relations with China. Australian Journal of International Affairs, 78(5), 600–613. doi:10.1080/10357718.2024.2406279
- McDougall, D. (2022). China ups the ante: The new Chinese security agreement with Solomon Islands. The Round Table, 111(3), 453–454. doi:10.1080/00358533.2022.2083780
- Medcalf, R. (2018). Australia and China: Understanding the reality check. Australian Journal of International Affairs, 73(2), 109–118. doi:10.1080/10357718.2018.1538315
- Smith, G., & Wesley-Smith, T. (Eds.). (2021). The China alternative: Changing regional order in the Pacific Islands. ANU Press.
- Zhang, D., & Lawson, S. (2017). China in Pacific regional politics. The Round Table, 106(2), 197–206. doi:10.1080/00358533.2017.1296705
- Zhang, D., & Shivakumar, H. (2017). Dragon versus elephant: A comparative study of Chinese and Indian aid in the Pacific. Asia & the Pacific Policy Studies, 4(2), 260–271. doi:10.1002/app5.179

==== East China Sea ====
- Costa, A. (2017). The China–Japan conflict over the Senkaku/Diaoyu Islands: Useful rivalry. Routledge.
- Dreyer, J. T. (2016). Middle Kingdom and Empire of the Rising Sun: Sino-Japanese relations, past and present. Oxford University Press.
- Gries, P. H., Steiger, D., & Wang, T. (2015). Popular nationalism and China's Japan policy: The Diaoyu Islands protests, 2012–2013. Journal of Contemporary China, 25(98), 264–276. doi:10.1080/10670564.2015.1075714
- Hughes, C. W. (2016). Japan's 'resentful realism' and balancing China's rise. The Chinese Journal of International Politics, 9(2), 109–150. doi:10.1093/cjip/pow004
- Manicom, J. (2014). Bridging troubled waters: China, Japan, and maritime order in the East China Sea. Georgetown University Press.
- Pugliese, G., & Insisa, A. (2017). Sino-Japanese power politics: Might, money and minds. Palgrave Macmillan.
- Smith, S. A. (2015). Intimate rivals: Japanese domestic politics and a rising China. Columbia University Press.
- Su, J. (2015). The East China Sea air defense identification zone and international law. Chinese Journal of International Law, 14(2), 271–303. doi:10.1093/chinesejil/jmv027
- Wallace, J. L., & Weiss, J. C. (2015). The political geography of nationalist protest in China: Cities and the 2012 anti-Japanese protests. The China Quarterly, 222, 403–429. doi:10.1017/s0305741015000417
- Weiss, J. C. (2014). Powerful patriots: Nationalist protest in China's foreign relations. Oxford University Press.

==== South China Sea ====
- Chubb, A. (2021). PRC assertiveness in the South China Sea: Measuring continuity and change, 1970–2015. International Security, 45(3), 79–121. doi:10.1162/isec_a_00400
- Hayton, B. (2014). The South China Sea: The struggle for power in Asia. Yale University Press.
- Hayton, B. (2018). The modern origins of China's South China Sea claims: Maps, misunderstandings, and the maritime geobody. Modern China, 45(2), 127–170. doi:10.1177/0097700418771678
- Kardon, I. B. (2023). China's law of the sea: The new rules of maritime order. Yale University Press.
- Martinson, R. D. (2021). Getting synergized? PLAN-CCG cooperation in the maritime gray zone. Asian Security, 18(2), 159–171. doi:10.1080/14799855.2021.2007077
- Morton, K. (2016). China's ambition in the South China Sea: Is a legitimate maritime order possible? International Affairs, 92(4), 909–940. doi:10.1111/1468-2346.12658
- Phan, H. D., & Nguyen, L. N. (2017). The South China Sea arbitration: Bindingness, finality, and compliance with UNCLOS dispute settlement decisions. Asian Journal of International Law, 8(1), 36–50. doi:10.1017/s2044251317000121
- Thayer, C. A. (2013). ASEAN, China and the code of conduct in the South China Sea. SAIS Review of International Affairs, 33(2), 75–84. doi:10.1353/sais.2013.0022
- Zhang, F. (2017). Chinese thinking on the South China Sea and the future of regional security. Political Science Quarterly, 132(3), 435–466. doi:10.1002/polq.12658
- Zhang, K. (2019). Cautious bully: Reputation, resolve, and Beijing's use of coercion in the South China Sea. International Security, 44(1), 117–159. doi:10.1162/isec_a_00354

=== Taiwan ===
- Bush, R. C. (2021). Difficult choices: Taiwan's quest for security and the good life. Brookings Institution Press.
- Dittmer, L. (Ed.). (2017). Taiwan and China: Fitful embrace. University of California Press.
- Ho, M.-s. (2015). Occupy Congress in Taiwan: Political opportunity, threat, and the Sunflower Movement. Journal of East Asian Studies, 15(1), 69–97. doi:10.1017/s1598240800004173
- Kastner, S. L. (2016). Is the Taiwan Strait still a flash point? Rethinking the prospects for armed conflict between China and Taiwan. International Security, 40(3), 54–92. doi:10.1162/isec_a_00227
- Kastner, S. L. (2022). War and peace in the Taiwan Strait. Columbia University Press.
- Lin, S. S. (2016). Taiwan's China dilemma: Contested identities and multiple interests in Taiwan's cross-Strait economic policy. Stanford University Press.
- Rigger, S. (2021). The tiger leading the dragon: How Taiwan propelled China's economic rise. Rowman & Littlefield.
- Rowen, I. (2015). Inside Taiwan's Sunflower Movement: Twenty-four days in a student-occupied parliament, and the future of the region. The Journal of Asian Studies, 74(1), 5–21. doi:10.1017/s0021911814002174
- Schubert, G. (Ed.). (2016). Taiwan and the "China impact": Challenges and opportunities. Routledge.
- Sullivan, J. (2024). Time matters in cross-Strait relations: Tsai Ing-wen and Taiwan's future. The China Quarterly, 259, 629–644. doi:10.1017/s0305741023001649

=== United States ===
- Allison, G. (2017). Destined for war: Can America and China escape Thucydides's trap? Houghton Mifflin Harcourt.
- Christensen, T. J. (2015). The China challenge: Shaping the choices of a rising power. W. W. Norton.
- Doshi, R. (2021). The long game: China's grand strategy to displace American order. Oxford University Press.
- Friedberg, A. L. (2022). Getting China wrong. Polity.
- Glaser, C. L. (2015). A U.S.-China grand bargain? The hard choice between military competition and accommodation. International Security, 39(4), 49–90. doi:10.1162/isec_a_00199
- Liu, T., & Woo, W. T. (2018). Understanding the U.S.–China trade war. China Economic Journal, 11(3), 319–340. doi:10.1080/17538963.2018.1516256
- Medeiros, E. S. (Ed.). (2023). Cold rivals: The new era of US–China strategic competition. Georgetown University Press.
- Rudd, K. (2022). The avoidable war: The dangers of a catastrophic conflict between the US and Xi Jinping's China. PublicAffairs.
- Schneider Rasador, G., & Moreira Cunha, A. (2025). The new security grey zone: Export controls, emerging technologies and US–China technological rivalry. The Pacific Review, 38(6), 1020–1048. doi:10.1080/09512748.2025.2470222
- Steinberg, J., & O'Hanlon, M. E. (2014). Strategic reassurance and resolve: U.S.–China relations in the twenty-first century. Princeton University Press.

=== Russia ===
- Bekkevold, J. I., & Lo, B. (Eds.). (2019). Sino-Russian relations in the 21st century. Palgrave Macmillan.
- Bolt, P. J., & Cross, S. N. (2018). China, Russia, and twenty-first century global geopolitics. Oxford University Press.
- Kaczmarski, M. (2015). Russia–China relations in the post-crisis international order. Routledge.
- Korolev, A. (2016). Systemic balancing and regional hedging: China–Russia relations. The Chinese Journal of International Politics, 9(4), 375–397. doi:10.1093/cjip/pow013
- Korolev, A. (2022). China–Russia strategic alignment in international politics. Amsterdam University Press.
- Lukin, A. (2018). China and Russia: The new rapprochement. Polity.
- Rozman, G. (2014). The Sino-Russian challenge to the world order: National identities, bilateral relations, and East versus West in the 2010s. Woodrow Wilson Center Press.
- Sagild, R. Å., & Hsiung, C. W. (2024). Chinese re-examinations of Russia? The strategic partnership in the wake of Russia's war against Ukraine. Journal of Contemporary China, 34(155), 781–796. doi:10.1080/10670564.2024.2358876
- Shakhanova, G. (2024). Sino-Russian rapprochement after Russia's invasion of Ukraine. The Pacific Review, 38(2), 203–230. doi:10.1080/09512748.2024.2368227
- Wishnick, E. (2016). In search of the 'Other' in Asia: Russia–China relations revisited. The Pacific Review, 30(1), 114–132. doi:10.1080/09512748.2016.1201129

=== Latin America ===
- DeHart, M. (2021). Transpacific developments: The politics of multiple Chinas in Central America. Cornell University Press.
- Ellis, R. E. (2014). China on the ground in Latin America: Challenges for the Chinese and impacts on the region. Palgrave Macmillan.
- Gallagher, K. P., & Irwin, A. (2015). China's economic statecraft in Latin America: Evidence from China's policy banks. Pacific Affairs, 88(1), 99–121. doi:10.5509/201588199
- Gallagher, K. P. (2016). The China triangle: Latin America's China boom and the fate of the Washington Consensus. Oxford University Press.
- Kaplan, S. B. (2016). Banking unconditionally: The political economy of Chinese finance in Latin America. Review of International Political Economy, 23(4), 643–676. doi:10.1080/09692290.2016.1216005
- Kaplan, S. B. (2021). Globalizing patient capital: The political economy of Chinese finance in the Americas. Cambridge University Press.
- Stallings, B. (2020). Dependency in the twenty-first century? The political economy of China–Latin America relations. Cambridge University Press.
- Urdinez, F., Mouron, F., Schenoni, L. L., & de Oliveira, A. J. (2016). Chinese economic statecraft and U.S. hegemony in Latin America: An empirical analysis, 2003–2014. Latin American Politics and Society, 58(4), 3–30. doi:10.1111/laps.12000
- Wise, C., & Chonn Ching, V. (2017). Conceptualizing China–Latin America relations in the twenty-first century: The boom, the bust, and the aftermath. The Pacific Review, 31(5), 553–572. doi:10.1080/09512748.2017.1408675
- Wise, C. (2020). Dragonomics: How Latin America is maximizing (or missing out on) China's international development strategy. Yale University Press.

=== Africa ===
- Alden, C., & Large, D. (Eds.). (2018). New directions in Africa–China studies. Routledge.
- Benabdallah, L. (2020). Shaping the future of power: Knowledge production and network-building in China–Africa relations. University of Michigan Press.
- Brautigam, D. (2015). Will Africa feed China? Oxford University Press.
- Carmody, P., Taylor, I., & Zajontz, T. (2021). China's spatial fix and 'debt diplomacy' in Africa: Constraining belt or road to economic transformation? Canadian Journal of African Studies, 56(1), 57–77. doi:10.1080/00083968.2020.1868014
- Driessen, M. (2019). Tales of hope, tastes of bitterness: Chinese road builders in Ethiopia. Hong Kong University Press.
- Hodzi, O. (2019). The end of China's non-intervention policy in Africa. Palgrave Macmillan.
- King, K. (2013). China's aid and soft power in Africa: The case of education and training. James Currey.
- Large, D. (2021). China and Africa: The new era. Polity.
- Lee, C. K. (2018). The specter of global China: Politics, labor, and foreign investment in Africa. University of Chicago Press.
- Shinn, D. H., & Eisenman, J. (2023). China's relations with Africa: A new era of strategic engagement. Columbia University Press.

=== India ===
- Bajpai, K. (2017). Narendra Modi's Pakistan and China policy: Assertive bilateral diplomacy, active coalition diplomacy. International Affairs, 93(1), 69–91. doi:10.1093/ia/iiw003
- Bajpai, K. (2021). India versus China: Why they are not friends. Juggernaut.
- Fang, T.-s. (2013). Asymmetrical threat perceptions in India–China relations. Oxford University Press.
- Ganguly, S., & Scobell, A. (2018). The Himalayan impasse: Sino-Indian rivalry in the wake of Doklam. The Washington Quarterly, 41(3), 177–190. doi:10.1080/0163660x.2018.1519369
- Joshi, M. (2022). Understanding the India–China border: The enduring threat of war in high Himalaya. Hurst.
- Kaura, V. (2020). India's relations with China from the Doklam crisis to the Galwan tragedy. India Quarterly: A Journal of International Affairs, 76(4), 501–518. doi:10.1177/0974928420961768
- Pardesi, M. S. (2021). India's China strategy under Modi: Continuity in the management of an asymmetric rivalry. International Politics, 59(1), 44–66. doi:10.1057/s41311-021-00287-3
- Paul, T. V. (Ed.). (2018). The China–India rivalry in the globalization era. Georgetown University Press.
- Rajagopalan, R. P., & Biswas, A. (2017). India–China relations under Xi Jinping: An Indian perspective. China: An International Journal, 15(1), 120–139. doi:10.1353/chn.2017.0007
- Smith, J. M. (2014). Cold peace: China–India rivalry in the twenty-first century. Lexington Books.

=== Korea ===
==== North ====
- Freeman, C. P. (Ed.). (2015). China and North Korea: Strategic and policy perspectives from a changing China. Palgrave Macmillan.
- Hoshino, M., & Hiraiwa, S. (2020). Four factors in the "special relationship" between China and North Korea: A framework for analyzing the China–North Korea relationship under Xi Jinping and Kim Jong-un. Journal of Contemporary East Asia Studies, 9(1), 18–28. doi:10.1080/24761028.2020.1754998
- Jones, C., & Teitt, S. (Eds.). (2020). China–North Korea relations: Between development and security. Edward Elgar.
- Kim, H. N. (2013). China's policy toward North Korea under the Xi Jinping leadership. North Korean Review, 9(2), 83–98. doi:10.3172/nkr.9.2.83
- Kim, I. (2019). Trump power: Maximum pressure and China's sanctions enforcement against North Korea. The Pacific Review, 33(1), 96–124. doi:10.1080/09512748.2018.1549589
- Zhang, Y. (2020). China's US-centric mentality and the evolution of its North Korea policy after the Cold War. China: An International Journal, 18(3), 153–168. doi:10.1353/chn.2020.0034

==== South ====
- Lim, D. J., & Ferguson, V. A. (2021). Informal economic sanctions: The political economy of Chinese coercion during the THAAD dispute. Review of International Political Economy, 29(5), 1525–1548. doi:10.1080/09692290.2021.1918746
- Snyder, S. A. (2018). South Korea at the crossroads: Autonomy and alliance in an era of rival powers. Columbia University Press.
- Yang, F. W.-t. (2019). Asymmetrical interdependence and sanction: China's economic retaliation over South Korea's THAAD deployment. Issues & Studies, 55(4), 1940008. doi:10.1142/s1013251119400083

=== Europe ===
- Casarini, N. (2016). When all roads lead to Beijing: Assessing China's New Silk Road and its implications for Europe. The International Spectator, 51(4), 95–108. doi:10.1080/03932729.2016.1224491
- Christiansen, T., & Maher, R. (2017). The rise of China: Challenges and opportunities for the European Union. Asia Europe Journal, 15(2), 121–131. doi:10.1007/s10308-017-0469-2
- Christiansen, T., Kirchner, E., & Wissenbach, U. (2019). The European Union and China. Red Globe Press.
- Garlick, J., & Qin, F. (2023). China's normative power in Central and Eastern Europe: '16/17 + 1' cooperation as a tale of unfulfilled expectations. Europe-Asia Studies, 75(4), 583–605. doi:10.1080/09668136.2023.2179601
- Holslag, J. (2019). The Silk Road trap: How China's trade ambitions challenge Europe. Polity.
- Jakimów, M. (2019). Desecuritisation as a soft power strategy: The Belt and Road Initiative, European fragmentation and China's normative influence in Central-Eastern Europe. Asia Europe Journal, 17(4), 369–385. doi:10.1007/s10308-019-00561-3
- Maher, R. (2016). The elusive EU–China strategic partnership. International Affairs, 92(4), 959–976. doi:10.1111/1468-2346.12659
- Matura, T. (2019). China–CEE trade, investment and politics. Europe-Asia Studies, 71(3), 388–407. doi:10.1080/09668136.2019.1571166
- Pepermans, A. (2018). China's 16+1 and Belt and Road Initiative in Central and Eastern Europe: Economic and political influence at a cheap price. Journal of Contemporary Central and Eastern Europe, 26(2–3), 181–203. doi:10.1080/25739638.2018.1515862
- Vangeli, A. (2017). China's engagement with the sixteen countries of Central, East and Southeast Europe under the Belt and Road Initiative. China & World Economy, 25(5), 101–124. doi:10.1111/cwe.12216

=== Middle East ===
- Dorraj, M., & English, J. (2013). The dragon nests: China's energy engagement of the Middle East. China Report, 49(1), 43–67. doi:10.1177/0009445513479243
- Ehteshami, A., Horesh, N., & Xu, R. (2018). Chinese-Iranian mutual strategic perceptions. The China Journal, 79, 1–20. doi:10.1086/693315
- Evron, Y. (2017). The economic dimension of China–Israel relations: Political implications, roles and limitations. Israel Affairs, 23(5), 828–847. doi:10.1080/13537121.2017.1343870
- Fulton, J. (2018). China's relations with the Gulf monarchies. Routledge.
- Fulton, J. (2021). China between Iran and the Gulf monarchies. Middle East Policy, 28(3–4), 203–216. doi:10.1111/mepo.12589
- Garlick, J., & Havlová, R. (2020). China's "Belt and Road" economic diplomacy in the Persian Gulf: Strategic hedging amidst Saudi–Iranian regional rivalry. Journal of Current Chinese Affairs, 49(1), 82–105. doi:10.1177/1868102619898706
- Murphy, D. C. (2022). China's rise in the Global South: The Middle East, Africa, and Beijing's alternative world order. Stanford University Press.
- Scita, J. (2022). China–Iran relations through the prism of sanctions. Asian Affairs, 53(1), 87–105. doi:10.1080/03068374.2022.2029060
- Sun, D., & Zoubir, Y. (2017). China's participation in conflict resolution in the Middle East and North Africa: A case of quasi-mediation diplomacy? Journal of Contemporary China, 27(110), 224–243. doi:10.1080/10670564.2018.1389019

=== Global governance ===
- Cai, C. (2019). The rise of China and international law: Taking Chinese exceptionalism seriously. Oxford University Press.
- Chin, G. T. (2016). Asian Infrastructure Investment Bank: Governance innovation and prospects. Global Governance: A Review of Multilateralism and International Organizations, 22(1), 11–25. doi:10.1163/19426720-02201002
- Dukalskis, A. (2023). A fox in the henhouse: China, normative change, and the UN Human Rights Council. Journal of Human Rights, 22(3), 334–350. doi:10.1080/14754835.2023.2193971
- Foot, R. (2020). China, the UN, and human protection: Beliefs, power, image. Oxford University Press.
- Fung, C. J. (2019). China and intervention at the UN Security Council: Reconciling status. Oxford University Press.
- Johnston, A. I. (2019). China in a world of orders: Rethinking compliance and challenge in Beijing's international relations. International Security, 44(2), 9–60. doi:10.1162/isec_a_00360
- Kastner, S. L., Pearson, M. M., & Rector, C. (2019). China's strategic multilateralism: Investing in global governance. Cambridge University Press.
- Weiss, J. C., & Wallace, J. L. (2021). Domestic politics, China's rise, and the future of the liberal international order. International Organization, 75(2), 635–664. doi:10.1017/s002081832000048x
- Wilson, J. D. (2017). The evolution of China's Asian Infrastructure Investment Bank: From a revisionist to status-seeking agenda. International Relations of the Asia-Pacific, 19(1), 147–176. doi:10.1093/irap/lcx015
- Zeng, J., Stevens, T., & Chen, Y. (2017). China's solution to global cyber governance: Unpacking the domestic discourse of "internet sovereignty". Politics & Policy, 45(3), 432–464. doi:10.1111/polp.12202

=== Other ===
- Brady, A.-M. (2017). China as a polar great power. Cambridge University Press.
- Economy, E. C. (2022). The world according to China. Polity.
- Johnston, A. I. (2013). How new and assertive is China's new assertiveness? International Security, 37(4), 7–48. doi:10.1162/isec_a_00115
- Jones, L., & Hameiri, S. (2021). Fractured China: How state transformation is shaping China's rise. Cambridge University Press.
- Pantucci, R., & Petersen, A. (2022). Sinostan: China's inadvertent empire. Oxford University Press.
- Shambaugh, D. (2020). Where great powers meet: America and China in Southeast Asia. Oxford University Press.
- Small, A. (2015). The China–Pakistan axis: Asia's new geopolitics. Oxford University Press.
- Strangio, S. (2020). In the dragon's shadow: Southeast Asia in the Chinese century. Yale University Press.
- Zhao, S. (2022). The dragon roars back: Transformational leaders and dynamics of Chinese foreign policy. Stanford University Press.

== Biography ==
- Bougon, F. (2018). Inside the mind of Xi Jinping (V. Lee, Trans.). Hurst. (Original work published 2017)
- Brown, K. (2016). CEO, China: The rise of Xi Jinping. I.B. Tauris.
- Brown, K. (2022). Xi: A study in power. Icon Books.
- Chan, A. L. (2022). Xi Jinping: Political career, governance, and leadership, 1953–2018. Oxford University Press.
- Clark, D. (2016). Alibaba: The house that Jack Ma built. Ecco.
- Clifford, M. L. (2024). The troublemaker: How Jimmy Lai became a billionaire, Hong Kong's greatest dissident, and China's most feared critic. Free Press.
- Dou, E. (2025). House of Huawei: The secret history of China's most powerful company. Portfolio.
- Ito, A., Lim, J., & Zhang, H. (2025). Remembering Li Keqiang: Policy divergence in Zhongnanhai and its economic consequences. The China Quarterly, 262, 352–370. doi:10.1017/s0305741025000165
- Ling, Q., & Berkowitz, D. (2017). Constructing a 'first' First Lady through memory: The case of China's Peng Liyuan. Journalism, 19(9–10), 1239–1256. doi:10.1177/1464884917701766
- Patapan, H., & Wang, Y. (2017). The hidden ruler: Wang Huning and the making of contemporary China. Journal of Contemporary China, 27(109), 47–60. doi:10.1080/10670564.2017.1363018
- Shambaugh, D. (2021). China's leaders: From Mao to now. Polity.
- Torigian, J. (2025). The party's interests come first: The life of Xi Zhongxun, father of Xi Jinping. Stanford University Press.
- Wong, C. H. (2023). Party of one: The rise of Xi Jinping and China's superpower future. Avid Reader Press.

== Historiography ==
- Denton, K. A. (2014). Exhibiting the past: Historical memory and the politics of museums in postsocialist China. University of Hawai'i Press.
- Greitens, S. C., & Truex, R. (2019). Repressive experiences among China scholars: New evidence from survey data. The China Quarterly, 242, 349–375. doi:10.1017/s0305741019000365
- Johnson, I. (2023). Sparks: China's underground historians and their battle for the future. Oxford University Press.
- Karl, R. E. (2021). In the realm of comrades? Scattered thoughts occasioned by the centenary of the founding of the Chinese Communist Party, 1921–2021. The China Quarterly, 248(S1), 16–28. doi:10.1017/s0305741021000710
- Mittelstaedt, J. C. (2026). Historical nihilism: The rise of a political technology. The China Journal, 96, 88–113. doi:10.1086/740118
- Mitter, R. (2020). China's good war: How World War II is shaping a new nationalism. Harvard University Press.
- Tiffert, G. D. (2019). Peering down the memory hole: Censorship, digitization, and the fragility of our knowledge base. The American Historical Review, 124(2), 550–568. doi:10.1093/ahr/rhz286
- Torigian, J. (2018). Historical legacies and leaders' worldviews: Communist Party history and Xi's learned (and unlearned) lessons. China Perspectives, 2018(1–2), 7–15. doi:10.4000/chinaperspectives.7548
- Wang, Z. (2012). Never forget national humiliation: Historical memory in Chinese politics and foreign relations. Columbia University Press.

== Primary sources ==
- Cheek, T., Ownby, D., & Fogel, J. A. (Eds.). (2019). Voices from the Chinese century: Public intellectual debate from contemporary China. Columbia University Press.
- Chen, G. (2015). The barefoot lawyer: A blind man's fight for justice and freedom in China. Henry Holt.
- Fang, F. (2020). Wuhan diary: Dispatches from a quarantined city (M. Berry, Trans.). HarperVia. (Original work published 2020)
- General Secretary Xi Jinping explicates the "Chinese Dream". (2016). Chinese Law & Government, 48(6), 477–479. doi:10.1080/00094609.2016.1241116
- Hoja, G. (2023). A stone is most precious where it belongs: A memoir of Uyghur exile, hope, and survival. Hachette Books.
- Izgil, T. H. (2023). Waiting to be arrested at night: A Uyghur poet's memoir of China's genocide (J. L. Freeman, Trans.). Penguin Press.
- Sauytbay, S., & Cavelius, A. (2021). The chief witness: Escape from China's modern-day concentration camps (C. Waight, Trans.). Scribe.
- Shum, D. (2021). Red roulette: An insider's story of wealth, power, corruption and vengeance in today's China. Simon & Schuster.
- Take a correct view of the two historical periods before and after reform and opening up: Study General Secretary Xi Jinping's important exposition on "the two 'cannot negates'". (2016). Chinese Law & Government, 48(6), 430–434. doi:10.1080/00094609.2016.1241101
- Tohti, I. (2022). We Uyghurs have no say: An imprisoned writer speaks (Y. Cao, C. Carter, & M. Robertson, Trans.). Verso.
- Woeser, T. (2016). Tibet on fire: Self-immolations against Chinese rule (K. Carrico, Trans.). Verso.
- Wong, J., & Ng, J. Y. (2020). Unfree speech: The threat to global democracy and why we must act, now. WH Allen.
- Xi, J. (2014–2022). The governance of China (Vols. 1–4). Foreign Languages Press.
- Xi Jinping: How I got into politics. (2016). Chinese Law & Government, 48(6), 418–424. doi:10.1080/00094609.2016.1241099
- Xi Jinping: Ideological work is extremely important work for the party. (2016). Chinese Law & Government, 48(6), 452–455. doi:10.1080/00094609.2016.1241108
- Xi Jinping: Keep power reined within the cage of regulations. (2016). Chinese Law & Government, 48(6), 458. doi:10.1080/00094609.2016.1241110
- Xu, Z. (2017). To build a free China: A citizen's journey (J. Rosenzweig & Y. Cao, Trans.). Lynne Rienner.

== See also ==
- 2019–2020 Hong Kong protests
- 2020 Hong Kong national security law
- Anti-corruption campaign under Xi Jinping
- Belt and Road Initiative
- Bibliography of Chinese history
- Bibliography of Xi Jinping
- China–United States trade war
- Chinese Dream
- COVID-19 pandemic in mainland China
- General secretaryship of Xi Jinping
- History of China (2002–2012)
- Human rights in China
- Mass surveillance in China
- Persecution of Uyghurs in China
- Wolf warrior diplomacy
- Xi Jinping
- Xi Jinping Thought
- Zero-COVID
