= Reader of General Secretary Xi Jinping's Series of Important Speeches =

2014 book by Xi Jinping

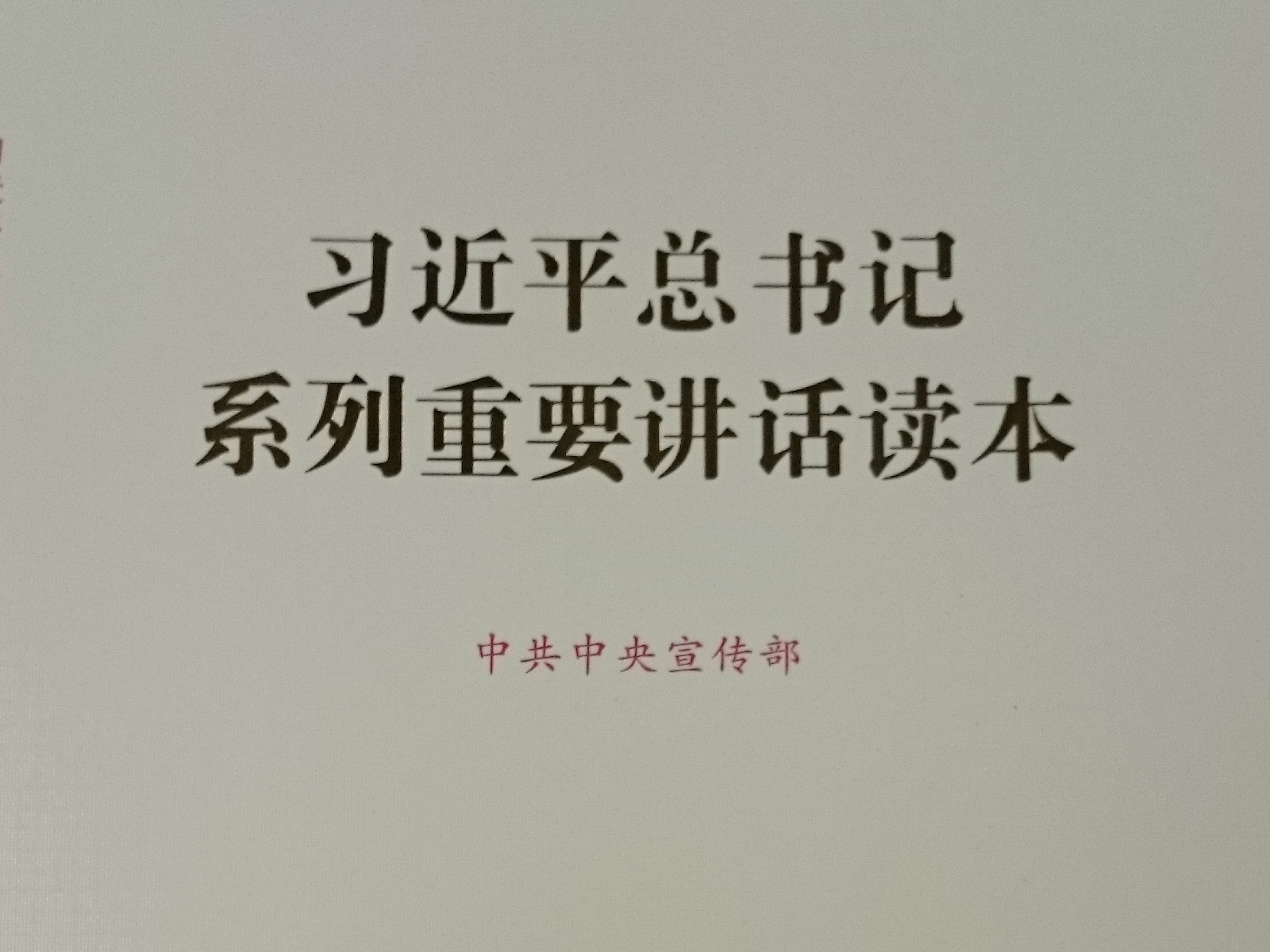
- Editor: Publicity Department of the Chinese Communist Party
- Author: Xi Jinping
- Original title: Chinese: 习近平总书记系列重要讲话读本; Xí Jìnpíng zǒng shūjì xìliè zhòngyào jiǎnghuà dúběn
- Language: Simplified Chinese
- Publisher: People's Publishing House; Study Publishing House
- Publication date: 23 June 2014 (old edition); 5 April 2016 (new edition)
- Publication place: People's Republic of China
- Media type: Print (hardback & paperback)
- ISBN: 978-7-5147-0628-4 (2016 edition); 978-7-5147-0477-8 (2014 edition)

Reader of General Secretary Xi Jinping's Series of Important Speeches
- Simplified Chinese: 习近平总书记系列重要讲话读本
- Traditional Chinese: 習近平總書記系列重要講話讀本
Transcriptions
Standard Mandarin
- Hanyu Pinyin: Xí Jìnpíng zǒng shūjì xìliè zhòngyào jiǎnghuà dúběn
Yue: Cantonese
- Yale Romanization: Zàahp Gàhnpeng zūng syùgéi hàihlàaht cungjìu gōngwāa dàuhbūn
- Jyutping: Zaap6gan6ping4 zung2syu1gei3 hai6lit6 zung6jiu3 gong2waa6

Reader of General Secretary Xi Jinping's Series of Important Speeches is a book of statements from speeches by Xi Jinping, the current General Secretary of the Chinese Communist Party, published in 2014 and 2016 and widely distributed during his leadership.

The book was originally compiled by the Publicity Department of the Chinese Communist Party and published by official People's Publishing House and Study Publishing House. The Organization Department of the Chinese Communist Party has ordered cadres and university students to study the book and learn "the spirit of the General Secretary's speeches."

== History ==
In June 2014, the Publicity Department published the book, which the Publicity and Organization Departments ordered to be mandatory, leading party schools and universities to incorporate the book into their curricula. The Publicity Department and the Organization Department of the CCP Central Committee have issued a notice requiring the textbook to be studied within the CCP. At the same time, they also require all universities to use it as a “theoretical study textbook for teachers and students”. The orders led party schools and universities to incorporate the book into their curricula.

The 2014 edition, volume 32, is priced at RMB 13, while the 2016 edition, volume 32, is priced at RMB 16. There is also a "Publication Copyright Traceability Protection Verification Code" at the bottom of the book. The official media of the People's Republic of China stated that the book is a best-seller. Xinhua News Agency stated: "The Reader provides important supplementary materials for Party members, cadres and the general public to learn the spirit of the speech."

== Description ==
According to Xinhua News Agency, the book "explains the significance, connotation, spiritual essence and practical requirements of Xi Jinping’s series of important speeches."

== See also ==
- Bibliography of Xi Jinping
- Xi Jinping Thought
