= Chinese Communist Party History Press =

Chinese publishing house

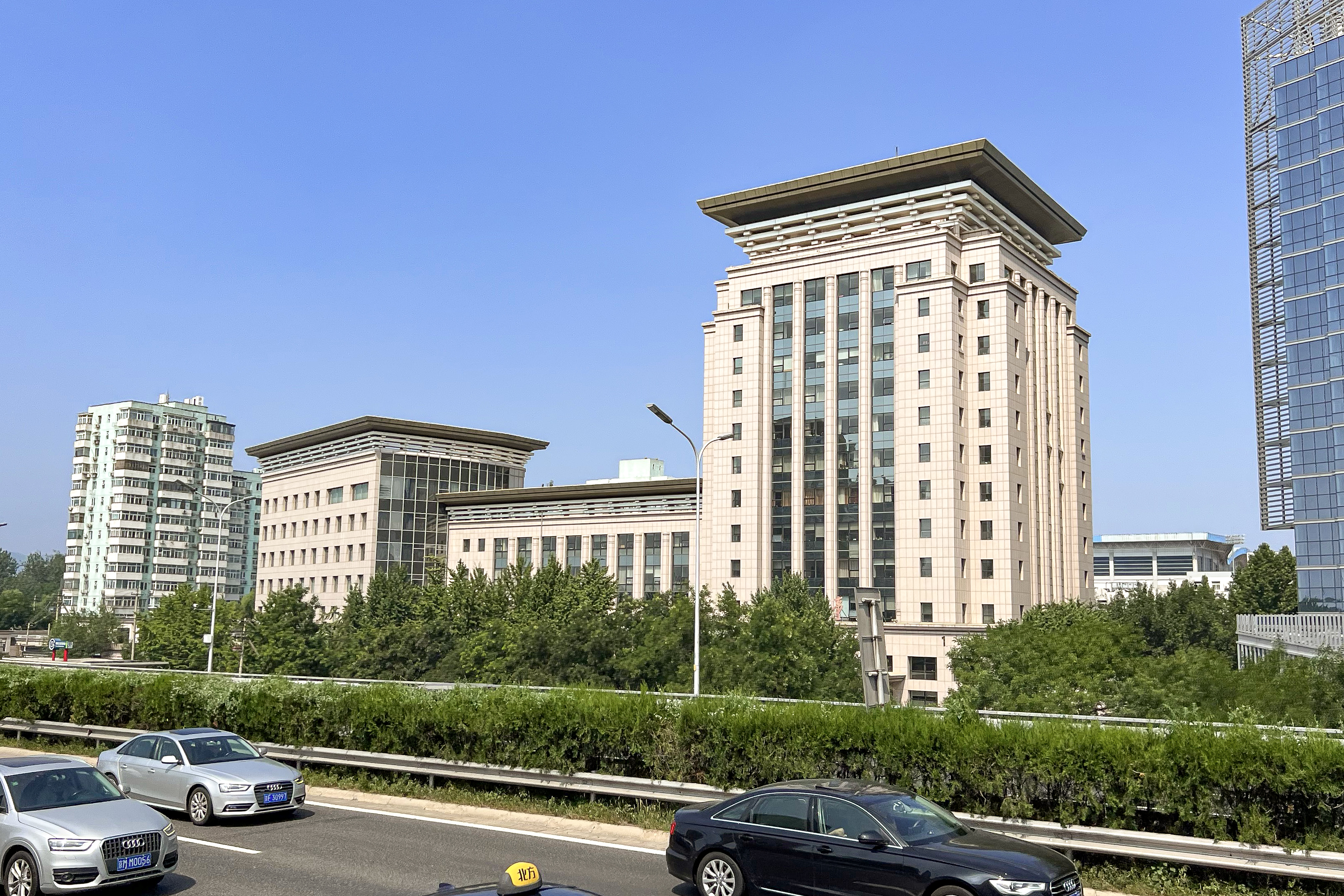
Headquarters of CCP History Press

The Chinese Communist Party History Press (Chinese: 中共党史出版社) is a publishing house in Beijing, China. The publisher was founded in 1983. By its 20th anniversary, it had released more than 1,900 books about the Chinese Communist Party's history which amounted to over 12 million copies. It is sponsored by the Central Committee of the Chinese Communist Party's Institute of Party History and Literature.
