= Bibliography of Xi Jinping =

David McDowall may refer to:

- Bibliography of works about Xi Jinping
- Bibliography of works by Xi Jinping

== See also ==
- Bibliography of the Xi Jinping era
