= Zhijiang Xinyu =

Book written by Xi Jinping

- Author: Xi Jinping
- Language: Chinese
- Publisher: Zhejiang People's Publishing House
- Publication date: August 2007
- Publication place: China
- Pages: 273
- ISBN: 9787213035081

Zhijiang Xinyu (Chinese: 之江新语) is a book written by Xi Jinping, then the party secretary of Zhejiang Province using the pen name "Zhexin" (Chinese: 哲欣). It was initially a personal column about political ideas published on the front page of Zhejiang Daily from 25 February 2003, to 25 March 2007. Xi published 232 essays in this column. In August 2007, these essays were published in a book also titled Zhijiang Xinyu in chronological order. The name of this book's English edition first published in 2019 is Zhejiang, China: A New Version for Development.

== Background ==
Being part of Qiantang river, Zhijiang (Chinese: 之江) is a key river in Zhejiang. Xinyu (Chinese: 新语) literally means 'new words'. This term is inspired by a classical Chinese text Shishuo Xinyu (Traditional Chinese: 世說新語).

== Content ==
Professor Yao Huan of the Beijing Party School divides these 232 essays into three categories:

1. How to implement the scientific development concept of Hu Jintao according to the reality of Zhejiang.
2. The work style and ideological methods of leading cadres, highlighting the mass line, to overcome bureaucracy and formalism.
3. On the cultivation of cadres' Party spirit, especially the correct treatment of power and interests, and adhering to the Party's purpose of "serve the people".

== Global influence ==
In addition to being published in mainland China, a traditional Chinese edition was published in Hong Kong in 2021. This book was also translated into several languages such as Mongolian, Spanish, German, English and Russian.
