= Central Literature Publishing House =

Chinese Communist Party publisher

Central Party Literature Publishing House, or Central Literature Publishing House (Chinese: 中央文献出版社), a publishing house of the Chinese Communist Party, is located at No. 1, Former Maojiawan, Xisi North Street, Xicheng District, Beijing.

== History ==
On April 15, 1987, the Central Literature Publishing House was formally established under the Documentation Research Office of the Chinese Communist Party (CCP). It publishes specialized collections of the major leaders of the CCP and the People's Republic of China; manuscripts of the leaders distributed within a certain range; monographs on the study of Maoism at home and abroad; and chronicles and biographies of revolutionaries and other personalities.
