= Li Qi (politician, born 1918) =

Chinese politician

Li Qi (March 24, 1918 – April 17, 2001, Chinese: 李琦), previously referred to as Li Shangqi Chinese: 李尚杞, was a male Chinese politician from Maguxian County, Zhili (now Hebei).

== Biography ==
=== Republic of China ===
In March 1936, Li Qi became a member of the Chinese National Liberation Pioneers. During the summer of that year, he affiliated with the Chinese Communist Party (CCP) and attained full membership in November 1938. From February 1938 until the conclusion of 1940, he was dispatched by the CCP organization to the Fifth Newly Organized Army of the National Revolutionary Army (NRA) to conduct clandestine operations as the secretary of the Work Committee. In July 1941, he was designated as the head of the Editorial and Review Section of the Publicity Department of the Northern Bureau of the Central Committee of the CCP. In that winter, he was assigned to the headquarters of the Eighth Route Army as the secretary to Peng Dehuai. In the autumn of 1943, he returned to Yan'an, initially attending the Central Party School for further studies, and thereafter served as a secretary in the Secretariat Office of the CCP Central Committee. From July 1947 to November 1949, held successive positions as the secretary of the CCP Taihang District Committee, secretary of the Anyang District Committee, and director of the Military Control Committee in Anyang City.

=== People's Republic of China ===
Following the proclamation of the People's Republic of China, he held the position of deputy director of Premier Zhou Enlai's Office from 1950 to 1956, subsequently serving as first secretary of the CCP Taiyuan Municipal Committee and director of the Publicity Department of the CCP Shanxi Provincial Committee from 1956 to 1964, before becoming vice minister of the Ministry of Culture and vice president of the Chinese People's Association for Friendship with Foreign Countries in 1964. After being assigned to work during the Cultural Revolution, he returned to Beijing in 1972 at the behest of Zhou Enlai. From the summer of 1973, he served as the head of the Science and Education Section of the State Council, deputy minister of education, deputy secretary of the Party Group of the Ministry of Education, and director of the Chinese Commission for UNESCO. In April 1979, he was reassigned to the office of the First Deputy Director of the Committee for the Publication of the Writings of Chairman Mao Zedong of the Central Committee of the Chinese Communist Party. In May 1980, he was appointed the inaugural deputy director of the Documentation Research Office of the CCP Central Committee (Chinese: 中共中央文献研究室). In April 1982, he assumed the role of director of the Documentation Research Office of the CCP Central Committee. From 1991, he served as the advisor to the Documentation Research Office of the CCP Central Committee.

He also served as a delegate to the 12th and 13th CCP National Congresses, was a member of the Standing Committee of the Fifth National Committee of the Chinese People's Political Consultative Conference, and held membership in the Standing Committees of the Sixth and Seventh National People's Congresses.

Li Qi died in Beijing on April 17, 2001, at the age of 83. His remains were cremated in the Babaoshan Revolutionary Cemetery on April 26, 2001.
