= Pang Xianzhi =

Chinese politician

- 逄先知

Director of the Party Documents Research Office of the Central Committee of the Chinese Communist Party
- In office June 1991 – October 2002
- Preceded by: Li Qi
- Succeeded by: Teng Wensheng

Personal details
- Born: October 1929 (age 96–97) Jiao County, Shandong, China
- Education: North China People's Revolutionary University
- Occupation: Historian, politician

Academic work
- Discipline: History
- Sub-discipline: History of the Chinese Communist Party

Pang Xianzhi (Chinese: 逄先知; pinyin: Páng Xiānzhī; born October 1929) is a Chinese historian and politician who served as director of the Party Documents Research Office of the Central Committee of the Chinese Communist Party from 1991 to 2002.

Pang was a representative of the 13th, 14th, and 15th National Congress of the Chinese Communist Party. He was a member of the Standing Committee of the 8th and 9th National People's Congress.

== Biography ==
Pang was born in Jiao County (now Qingdao), Shandong, in October 1929. He attended Lixian High School (now Qingdao No. 9 High School). He joined the Chinese Communist Party (CCP) in 1950. He graduated from the North China People's Revolutionary University at the same year.

After graduation in 1950, Pang was assigned to the Political Secretary Office of the Secretariat of the Chinese Communist Party (later renamed as the Secretariat of the General Office of the Central Committee of the Chinese Communist Party), responsible for managing Mao Zedong's books, newspapers, etc. Pang became deputy director of the Party Documents Research Office of the Central Committee of the Chinese Communist Party in 1982, rising to director in June 1991.

== Publications ==
- "和平演变"与反"和平演变" ["Peaceful Evolution" and "Anti-Peaceful Evolution"] (in Chinese). Beijing: China Social Publishing House. 1991. ISBN 978-7-80088-015-5.
- Pang Xianzhi; Feng Hui (1993). 毛泽东年谱: 1893–1949 [Chronicle of Mao Zedong: 1893–1949] (in Chinese). Beijing: People's Publishing House.
- 毛泽东和田家英 [Mao Zedong and Tian Jiaying] (in Chinese). Hong Kong: Mingliu Publishing House. 1997. ISBN 978-962-928-023-9.
- Pang Xianzhi; Li Jie (2000). 毛泽东与抗美援朝 [Mao Zedong and the Korean War] (in Chinese). Beijing: Central Literature Research Office. ISBN 978-7-5073-0892-1.
- Pang Xianzhi; Gong Yuzhi; Shi Zhongquan (2010). 毛泽东的读书生活 [Mao Zedong's Reading Life] (in Chinese). Beijing: Joint Publishing. ISBN 978-7-108-03333-8.
- Pang Xianzhi; Jin Chongji (2011). 毛泽东传 [Biography of Mao Zedong] (in Chinese). Beijing: Central Literature Research Office. ISBN 9787507339475.
- 毛泽东年谱 (1949–1976) [Chronicle of Mao Zedong: 1949–1976] (in Chinese). Beijing: Central Literature Research Office. 2013. ISBN 978-7-5073-3992-5.

Party political offices
Preceded by Li Qi	Director of the Party Documents Research Office of the Central Committee of the Chinese Communist Party; 1991–2002	Succeeded by Teng Wensheng
