= Institute of Party History and Literature =

Chinese Communist Party body

Institute of Party History and Literature of the Central Committee of the Chinese Communist Party
- 中国共产党中央委员会党史和文献研究院; Zhōngguó Gòngchǎndǎng Zhōngyāng Wĕiyuánhuì Dǎngshǐ Hé Wénxiàn Yánjiūyuàn

Agency overview
- Formed: 21 September 2018; 7 years ago
- Preceding agency: Party History Research Center of the Central Committee of the Chinese Communist Party Party Documents Research Office of the Central Committee of the Chinese Communist Party Compilation and Translation Bureau
- Type: Ministerial level agency
- Jurisdiction: Central Committee of the Chinese Communist Party
- Headquarters: Xicheng District, Beijing
- Agency executive: Qu Qingshan, President
- Parent agency: Central Committee of the Chinese Communist Party
- Website: www.dswxyjy.org.cn

Chinese name
- Simplified Chinese: 中国共产党中央委员会党史和文献研究院
- Traditional Chinese: 中國共產黨中央委員會黨史和文獻研究院
Transcriptions
Standard Mandarin
- Hanyu Pinyin: Zhōngguó Gòngchǎndǎng Zhōngyāng Wĕiyuánhuì Dǎngshǐ Hé Wénxiàn Yánjiūyuàn

The Institute of Party History and Literature of the Central Committee of the Chinese Communist Party is a school directly under the Central Committee of the Chinese Communist Party.

The institute is mainly responsible for studying the basic theory of Marxism, the Sinicization of Marxism and its main representatives, studying Xi Jinping Thought, studying the history of the CCP, editing and compiling important documents of Marxist classical writers and works of major leaders, and collecting and sorting out important documents of the party history. The institute was established in 2018 during a series of institutional reforms from the merger of three prior bodies.

== History ==
In March 2018, the responsibilities of the Party History Research Center of the Central Committee of the Chinese Communist Party, Party Documents Research Office of the Central Committee of the Chinese Communist Party, and the Compilation and Translation Bureau were integrated to form the Institute of Party History and Literature of the Central Committee of the Chinese Communist Party as part of the deepening the reform of the Party and state institutions. It was officially established on 21 September 2018.

== Subordinate institutions ==
=== Internal departments ===
- General Office
- First Research Department
- Second Research Department
- Third Research Department
- Fourth Research Department
- Fifth Research Department
- Sixth Research Department
- Seventh Research Department
- Research Planning Department
- Bureau of Foreign Cooperation and Exchange
- Information Data Center
- Personnel Bureau
- Organ Party Committee
- Retired Cadres Bureau

=== Directly affiliated public institutions ===
- Government Service Center

=== Directly affiliated enterprise units ===
- Central Literature Publishing House
- Chinese Communist Party History Publishing House
- Central Compilation & Translation Press

=== Social organizations ===
- Chinese Communist Party Literature Research Association
- Mao Zedong Poetry Research Association

== Academic journals ==
- Journal of Chinese Communist Party History Studies
- Hundred Year Tide
- Party Literature
- Foreign Theoretical Trends
- Marxism and Reality
- Contemporary World and Socialism
- Comparative Economic and Social Systems

== List of leaders ==
| Name (English) | Name (Chinese) | Tenure begins | Tenure ends | Note |
|---|---|---|---|---|
| Leng Rong | 冷溶 | March 2018 | April 2019 | |
| Qu Qingshan | 曲青山 | April 2019 | | |
