= The Umbrella Movement: Civil Resistance and Contentious Space in Hong Kong =

Essay collection

First edition

The Umbrella Movement: Civil Resistance and Contentious Space in Hong Kong is a 2019 non-fiction collection of essays about the Umbrella Movement, edited by Ngok Ma and Edmund W. Cheng and published by Amsterdam University Press.

Ben Bland of The Lowy Institute stated that the book counters disinformation from the Chinese central government and pro-Beijing entities which govern Hong Kong. Bland also stated that the book explains why Hong Kong people participated in the movement.

== Background ==
A total of 15 people wrote articles for this publication, with some being sole authors and others teaming with other authors, with the majority being located in Hong Kong. Field work was done by those located in Hong Kong.

== Contents ==
Part 1 describes how the movement was created. The history of political movements in favor of a democratic form of government in the territory are described in the initial chapter of the book. Part 2 includes information on what tactics were used in the movement. Part 3 describes the reactions taken by Hong Kong people and the Hong Kong government. Comparisons to other movements in Chinese speaking areas are in the final part.

== Reception ==
Bland stated that "is a valiant effort" to examine the protests, and that it is "a valuable addition to the literature." Bland argued that the authors of the essays should have added more exploration of how a Hong Kong identity was built.

Agnes S Ku of the Hong Kong University of Science and Technology argued that the book reads with "considerable cohesion" despite having a diverse authorship and subject coverage.

Eva PW Hung of Hang Seng University of Hong Kong described it as a "must-read".

Lev Nachman of University of California, Irvine wrote that the authors of the work "accomplish the difficult task of" keeping focus on a single topic whilst taking many essays from different fields of study and "combining" them "in a comprehensive and meaningful way". He added that the essays were difficult to compare as they had so many disparate "approaches and topics" and that he wished the authors focused on their respective areas of education.

Stephan Ortmann of City University of Hong Kong stated the book was "highly recommended and should be essential reading for anyone interested in Hong Kong." He had some criticism of part 4.
