= The Governance of China =

Series of books written by Xi Jinping

- English copies of The Governance of China
- Editors: State Council Information Office, Central Policy Research Office of the Central Committee of the Chinese Communist Party), China International Publishing Group
- Author: Xi Jinping
- Original title: 习近平谈治国理政
- Language: Mandarin Chinese (translated into several world languages, including English)
- Genre: Politics
- Publisher: Foreign Languages Press
- Publication date: 2014, 2017, 2020, 2022, 2025
- Publication place: Mainland China
- English publication date: 2014, 2017, 2020, 2022, 2025
- Media type: Print (Hardcover, Paperback)
- Pages: 515 (V.I), 620 (V.II), 639 (V.III), 729 (V.IV)
- ISBN: 978-7-119-09023-8 (Vol. I)
- Website: "china.org.cn".

The Governance of China
- Simplified Chinese: 习近平谈治国理政
- Traditional Chinese: 習近平談治國理政
Transcriptions
Standard Mandarin
- Hanyu Pinyin: Xí jìnpíng tán zhìguó lǐ zhèng

The Governance of China (Chinese: 习近平谈治国理政; pinyin: Xí jìnpíng tán zhìguó lǐ zhèng) is a five-volume collection of speeches and writings by Xi Jinping, the general secretary of the Chinese Communist Party. Presenting the official party line for China's development in the 21st century, the collection is an authoritative source on Xi Jinping Thought.

The volumes were published in 2014, 2017, 2020, 2022 and 2025 respectively.

== Overview ==
Governance of China consists of 470 pieces, organised thematically into 93 chapters. (Note: Volume I has 79 pieces spread across 18 chapters, volume II has 99 pieces spread across 17 chapters, and volume III has 92 pieces spread across 19 chapters.) First three volumes were edited by three entities: the State Council Information Office, the Central Policy Research Office of the Central Committee of the Chinese Communist Party, and the China International Publishing Group. The volumes are also interspersed with photography of Xi, depicting him "at work and in daily life". (Note: Volume I includes 45 photographs of Xi, volume II includes 29 photographs, and volume III includes 41 photographs.)

=== Major points ===
The text articulates Xi Jinping Thought, Xi's political philosophy as it relates to large-scale political issues concerning China including economics, domestic politics, international relations, infrastructure, technology, environmentalism, peaceful co-existence, and the military.

Volume I also contains a political biography of Xi in the appendix.

In Volume III, Xi calls on the Chinese Communist Party to centralize and strengthen its leadership on cybersecurity and IT issues, stating that these matters should be at the top of the national agenda and the Party's list of priorities.

== Release ==
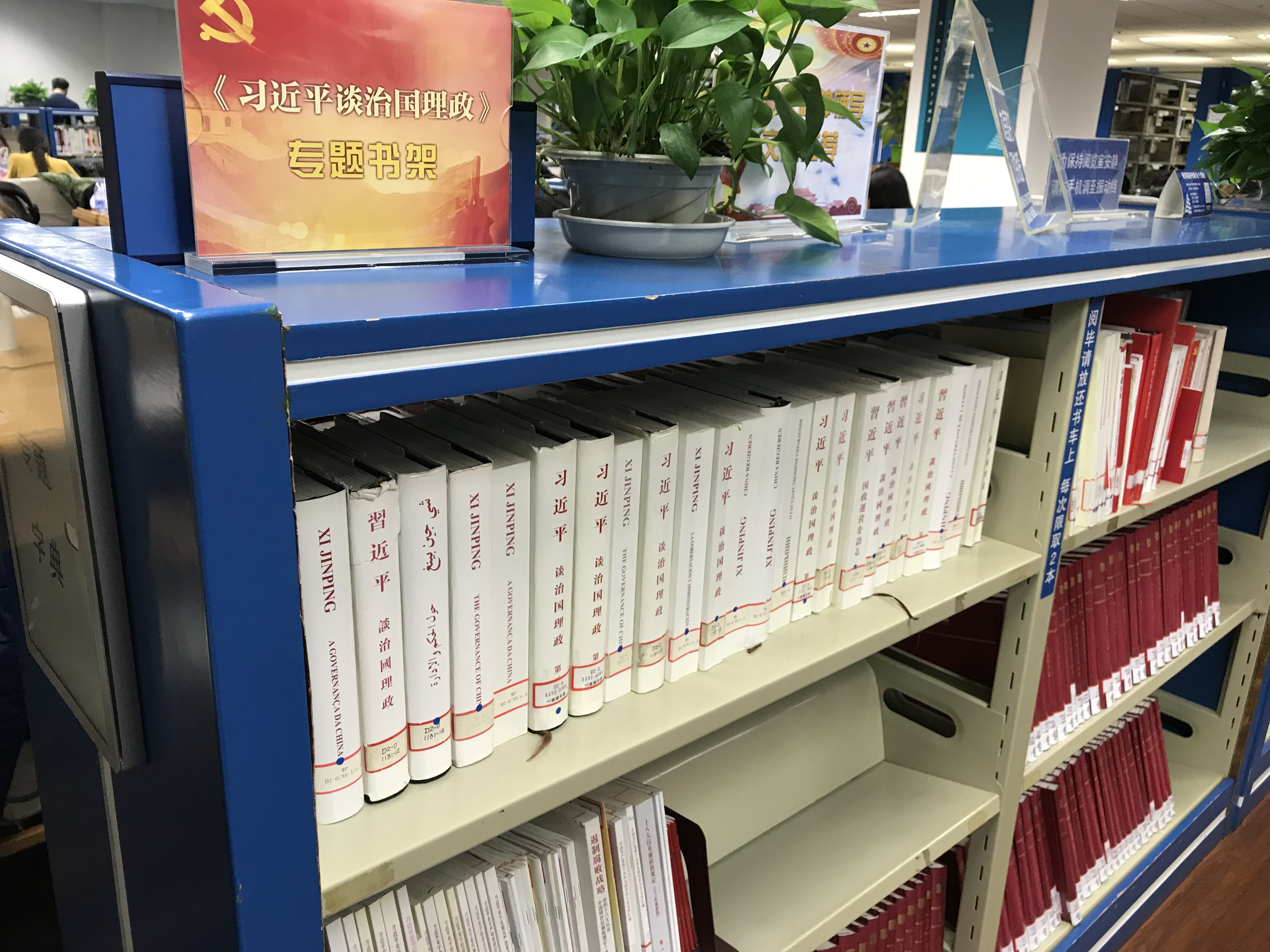
The Governance of China in different languages presented at Shanghai Library

The first volume of the Governance of China was released in September 2014. It contains 79 of Xi's speeches delivered from November 2012 to June 2014.

The first two volumes of Governance of China were formally presented to western audiences at the London Book Fair upon their release, and both volumes have been translated into other major languages, including English, Arabic, French, German, Japanese, Spanish, Portuguese, Russian, Uyghur, Tibetan, Kazakh, Korean, Kyrgyz, Mongolian, Polish, Standard Zhuang, and so forth. The third volume was announced by Chinese state media on 30 June 2020.

== Reception ==
In China, the release of the text was followed by the increased promotion and development of Xi Jinping Thought.

Reviews of Governance of China have been mixed. It was positively received by Chinese media and officials and received measured praise from non-Chinese leaders. Cambodian Prime Minister Hun Sen urged Cambodians to buy the book while Prayut Chan-o-cha, Thai Prime Minister, asked his cabinet to study it.

In Western media, it was received as a useful guide to better understanding Xi Jinping's leadership. Bethany Allen-Ebrahimian, writing in Foreign Policy, however, called it a "…mix of stilted Communist Party argot, pleasant-sounding generalizations, and 'Father Knows Best'-style advice to the world".

It received limited praise in other areas of Western society, however, with Facebook CEO Mark Zuckerberg reportedly having read the book and ordering copies for his company's employees (though Zuckerberg's interest in the book has been interpreted as a vested interest—Facebook is blocked in China, and if the block were lifted the potential result would be a dramatic increase in Facebook's userbase).

Although Chinese media have reported global circulation numbers for the book's volumes on the order of several million copies, Western media have reported very low sales numbers for the work in Western countries. A 2021 report published by Reuters, claimed that Amazon sided with the Publicity Department of the Chinese Communist Party and stopped allowing any customer reviews for the book on the Chinese version of the website, citing "two people familiar with the incident". In 2026, the Chinese embassy in Nepal expressed concern that copies of The Governance of China had been burned at Manmohan Technical University.

== See also ==
- General Secretary Xi Jinping important speech series
- Quotations from Chairman Mao Zedong
