= Leng Rong =

Chinese politician

- 冷溶

President of the Institute of Party History and Literature of the Central Committee of the Chinese Communist Party
- In office March 2018 – April 2019
- Preceded by: New title
- Succeeded by: Qu Qingshan

Director of the Party Documents Research Office of the Central Committee of the Chinese Communist Party
- In office December 2007 – March 2018
- Preceded by: Teng Wensheng
- Succeeded by: Position revoked

Personal details
- Born: August 1953 (age 73) Pingdu County, Shandong, China
- Party: Chinese Communist Party
- Education: Peking University

Leng Rong (Chinese: 冷溶; pinyin: Lěng Róng; born August 1953) is a Chinese politician and the current deputy director of the National People's Congress Education, Science, Culture and Public Health Committee. He served as president of the Institute of Party History and Literature of the Central Committee of the Chinese Communist Party between 2018 and 2019. He is a member of the 19th Central Committee of the Chinese Communist Party.

== Biography ==
Leng was born in Pingdu County, Shandong, in August 1953. In September 1969, he became a soldier in the Fifth Division of the Heilongjiang Production and Construction Corps. In January 1973, he was transferred to Beijing No.2 Machine Tool Works. After the resumption of college entrance examination, in September 1979, he entered Peking University, majoring in philosophy.

After graduating in August 1983, he was despatched to the Party Documents Research Office of the Central Committee of the Chinese Communist Party, where he was promoted to deputy director in 1997 and to executive deputy director in 2001. He was vice president of Chinese Academy of Social Sciences in November 2004, and held that office until December 2007. Then he succeeded Teng Wensheng as director of the Party Documents Research Office of the Central Committee of the Chinese Communist Party. He was also president of the Chinese Society of Scientific Socialism and Chinese Communist Literature Research Association. In March 2018, the Party Documents Research Office of the Central Committee of the Chinese Communist Party was revoked and its function was merged into the newly founded Institute of Party History and Literature of the Central Committee of the Chinese Communist Party, he was made president. In March 2018, he was appointed deputy director of the National People's Congress Education, Science, Culture and Public Health Committee.

Party political offices
Preceded by Jin Chongji	Executive Deputy Director of the Party Documents Research Office of the Central Committee of the Chinese Communist Party; 2001–2004	Succeeded by Yang Shengqun
Preceded by Teng Wensheng	Director of the Party Documents Research Office of the Central Committee of the Chinese Communist Party; 2007–2018	Position revoked
New title	President of the Institute of Party History and Literature of the Central Committee of the Chinese Communist Party; 2018–2019	Succeeded by Qu Qingshan
