= Party and state leaders =

Overview of national leaders of China

"Party and state leaders" (Chinese: 党和国家领导人; Vietnamese: Lãnh đạo chủ chốt của Đảng và Nhà nước) is a governmental and political jargon currently used in political discourse of China, and a lesser extent of Vietnam, in reference to specific senior political leaders in those countries. The jargon is used in In both formal and colloquial contexts, and referred to a defined group of leaders in those countries.

In Chinese political discourse, "party and state leaders" refer to a limited group of individuals currently holding approximately 100 specific positions in the Chinese Communist Party (CCP) and the Government of the People's Republic of China (PRC) that are classified into the top two ranks in the Civil service of China:

- National-level principals, or colloquially "national leaders" (Chinese: 国家级正职 or 正国级)
- National-level deputies, or colloquially "national deputy-level leaders" (Chinese: 国家级副职 or 副国级)

== Other usages ==
In Vietnamese political discourse the term refers to individuals holding, as of September 2025, five specific offices. While it remain a formal designation in the Government of Vietnam, the term has been gradually replaced by the colloquial term four pillars in day-to-day use since the early 2000s, which was further formally updated to the five pillars in September 2025.

The term has also been used in the past in China and Vietnam in references to top political leaders of the former Soviet Union.

== Current qualified office holders ==
The senior leaders of the following institutions qualify as party and state leaders:

- Senior leaders of the three key organs of the Chinese Communist Party (CCP)
  - Central Committee
    - General Secretary of the Central Committee (highest position)
    - Politburo Standing Committee – members
    - Politburo – members and alternate members
    - Secretariat – secretaries
  - Central Military Commission (of the CPP) – Chair and Vice Chairs
  - Central Commission for Discipline Inspection – Secretary
- Senior leaders of the seven key institutions of the People's Republic of China (PRC)
  - National People's Congress – Chair, Vice Chairs of the Standing Committee
  - Presidency – President, Vice President
  - State Council – Premier, Vice Premiers, State Councilors
  - Central Military Commission (of the government) – Chair and Vice Chairs (rank: General/Admiral/Air Force General)
  - National Supervisory Commission – Director (rank: Censor-General)
  - Supreme People's Court – President (rank: Chief Justice)
  - Supreme People's Procuratorate – Procurator-General (rank: Chief Procurator)
- Senior leaders of the Chinese People's Political Consultative Conference
  - National Committee of the Chinese People's Political Consultative Conference – Chair, Vice Chairs

Currently, the officeholders of eight titles are qualified as national-level principals and the holder of ten additional titles are qualified as national-level deputies. Many of the titles have multiple positions, and a number of individuals hold multiple positions on the list. Approximately 70 individuals currently formally qualified as party and state leaders, holding among them approximately 100 specific positions. Of the office holders, 6 are women, 19 are not official members of the CCP.

=== National-level principals ===
The officeholders of eight titles, (one with multiple positions) are formally classified as national-level principal. The position of national vice president is not among the offices classified as such, but the current vice president Han Zheng is granted the standing and privileges as a national-level principal leader due previous service in one of these offices. The current occupants of these offices are as follows:

Office	Entity	Office holder	Concurrent offices held
General Secretary, Central Committee	Party	Xi Jinping 习近平	
Chair, Central Military Commission	State & Party	Xi Jinping 习近平	
President of China	State	Xi Jinping 习近平	
Premier, State Council	State	Li Qiang 李强	
Chair, National People's Congress	State	Zhao Leji 赵乐际	
Chair, Chinese People's Political Consultative Conference	State	Wang Huning 王沪宁	
Standing Committee Members, Politburo (seven in total inclusive of four holding offices listed above)	Party	Cai Qi 蔡奇	First Secretary, CPP Secretariat; Director, General Office of the Central Committee; Director, Office of the General Secretary
Standing Committee Members, Politburo (seven in total inclusive of four holding offices listed above)	Party	Ding Xuexiang 丁薛祥	Ranking Vice Premier, State Council
Standing Committee Members, Politburo (seven in total inclusive of four holding offices listed above)	Party	Li Xi 李希	Secretary, Standing Committee of the Central Commission for Discipline Inspection; Director, Central Leading Group for Inspection Work
Vice President of China (not formally classified as National-level principal leader)	State	Han Zheng 韩正	

=== National-level deputies ===
Officeholders of the following offices qualify as national-level deputies and therefore considered among the party and state leaders of China.

- Members, Politburo
- Secretaries, Secretariat of the CCP
- Vice Chairs,Central Military Commission
- Vice Chairpersons, Standing Committee of the National People's Congress (NPC)
- Vice Premiers and State Councilors, State Council
- President of the Supreme People's Court
- Procurator-General of the Supreme People's Procuratorate
- Vice Chairperson of the National Committee of the Chinese People's Political Consultative Conference (CCPCC)

The following are the holders of positions of the Chinese Communist Party (elected or appointed around the 20th National Congress of the Chinese Communist Party held in October 2022, unless otherwise noted) and offices of the People's Republic of China (appointed around the subsequent 14th National People's Congress held in March 2023 unless otherwise noted) including those who have been formally removed from office or are currently under investigation.

Qualifying Office	Entity	Office holders	Concurrent offices held
14 Members, Politburo (plus 7 national-level principal leaders listed above) (3 dismissed from office)	Party	~~Ma Xingrui 马兴瑞~~ (Note: Detained and dismissed from office)	~~CCP Secretary of Xinjiang (2021)~~
14 Members, Politburo (plus 7 national-level principal leaders listed above) (3 dismissed from office)	Party	Wang Yi 王毅	Director, Central Foreign Affairs Commission; Minister of Foreign Affairs (July 2023)
14 Members, Politburo (plus 7 national-level principal leaders listed above) (3 dismissed from office)	Party	Yin Li 尹力	CCP Secretary of Beijing
14 Members, Politburo (plus 7 national-level principal leaders listed above) (3 dismissed from office)	Party	Shi Taifeng 石泰峰	Secretary, CCP Secretariat; Head, Central Organization Department (2023); Vice Chairperson (ranking), National Committee of CCPCC
14 Members, Politburo (plus 7 national-level principal leaders listed above) (3 dismissed from office)	Party	Liu Guozhong 刘国中	Vice Premier, State Council
14 Members, Politburo (plus 7 national-level principal leaders listed above) (3 dismissed from office)	Party	Li Ganjie 李干杰	Secretary, CCP Secretariat; Head, Central United Front Work Department
14 Members, Politburo (plus 7 national-level principal leaders listed above) (3 dismissed from office)	Party	Li Shulei 李书磊	Secretary, CCP Secretariat; Head, Central Publicity Department
14 Members, Politburo (plus 7 national-level principal leaders listed above) (3 dismissed from office)	Party	Li Hongzhong 李鸿忠 (Note: Politburo member since 2017)	Vice Chair (ranking), Standing Committee of NPC
14 Members, Politburo (plus 7 national-level principal leaders listed above) (3 dismissed from office)	Party	~~Gen. He Weidong 何卫东~~	~~Vice Chairman of the Central Military Commission~~
14 Members, Politburo (plus 7 national-level principal leaders listed above) (3 dismissed from office)	Party	He Lifeng 何立峰	Vice Premier of China
14 Members, Politburo (plus 7 national-level principal leaders listed above) (3 dismissed from office)	Party	~~Gen. Zhang Youxia 张又侠~~	~~Vice Chairman of the Central Military Commission (2017/18)~~
14 Members, Politburo (plus 7 national-level principal leaders listed above) (3 dismissed from office)	Party	Zhang Guoqing 张国清	Vice Premier of China
14 Members, Politburo (plus 7 national-level principal leaders listed above) (3 dismissed from office)	Party	Chen Wenqing 陈文清	Secretary, CCP Secretariat; Secretary, Central Political and Legal Affairs Commission
14 Members, Politburo (plus 7 national-level principal leaders listed above) (3 dismissed from office)	Party	Chen Jining 陈吉宁	CCP Secretary of Shanghai
14 Members, Politburo (plus 7 national-level principal leaders listed above) (3 dismissed from office)	Party	Chen Min'er 陈敏尔	CCP Secretary of Tianjin
14 Members, Politburo (plus 7 national-level principal leaders listed above) (3 dismissed from office)	Party	Yuan Jiajun 袁家军	CCP Secretary of Chongqing
14 Members, Politburo (plus 7 national-level principal leaders listed above) (3 dismissed from office)	Party	Huang Kunming 黄坤明	CCP Secretary of Guangdong
2 Secretaries, Secretariat of the CCP (plus Cai Qi, classified as a national-level principal leader, and 4 secretaries who are Politburo members)	Party	Liu Jinguo 刘金国	Director of the National Supervisory Commission
2 Secretaries, Secretariat of the CCP (plus Cai Qi, classified as a national-level principal leader, and 4 secretaries who are Politburo members)	Party	CG Wang Xiaohong 王小洪	State Councilor; Minister of Public Security (2022)
1 Vice Chair, Central Military Commission (plus vice chair Zhang Youxia, a Politburo member)	State & Party	Gen. Zhang Shengmin 张升民	Vice Chairman of the Central Military Commission (2025)
13 Vice Chairpersons of the Standing Committee of NPC (plus ranking vice chairperson Li Hongzhong, a Politburo member)	State	Wang Dongming 王东明 (Note: Vice Chair, Standing Committee of the NPC since 2018)	
13 Vice Chairpersons of the Standing Committee of NPC (plus ranking vice chairperson Li Hongzhong, a Politburo member)	State	Xiao Jie 肖捷	
13 Vice Chairpersons of the Standing Committee of NPC (plus ranking vice chairperson Li Hongzhong, a Politburo member)	State	Zheng Jianbang 郑建邦	Chair, Revolutionary Committee of the Chinese Kuomintang (2022)
13 Vice Chairpersons of the Standing Committee of NPC (plus ranking vice chairperson Li Hongzhong, a Politburo member)	State	Ding Zhongli 丁仲礼	Chair, China Democratic League (2017)
13 Vice Chairpersons of the Standing Committee of NPC (plus ranking vice chairperson Li Hongzhong, a Politburo member)	State	Hao Mingjin 郝明金	Chair, China Democratic National Construction Association (2017)
13 Vice Chairpersons of the Standing Committee of NPC (plus ranking vice chairperson Li Hongzhong, a Politburo member)	State	Cai Dafeng 蔡达峰	Chair, China Association for Promoting Democracy (2017)
13 Vice Chairpersons of the Standing Committee of NPC (plus ranking vice chairperson Li Hongzhong, a Politburo member)	State	He Wei 何维	Chair, Chinese Peasants' and Workers' Democratic Party (2022)
13 Vice Chairpersons of the Standing Committee of NPC (plus ranking vice chairperson Li Hongzhong, a Politburo member)	State	Wu Weihua 武维华	Chair, Jiusan Society (2017)
13 Vice Chairpersons of the Standing Committee of NPC (plus ranking vice chairperson Li Hongzhong, a Politburo member)	State	Tie Ning 铁凝	
13 Vice Chairpersons of the Standing Committee of NPC (plus ranking vice chairperson Li Hongzhong, a Politburo member)	State	Peng Qinghua 彭清华	
13 Vice Chairpersons of the Standing Committee of NPC (plus ranking vice chairperson Li Hongzhong, a Politburo member)	State	Zhang Qingwei 张庆伟	
13 Vice Chairpersons of the Standing Committee of NPC (plus ranking vice chairperson Li Hongzhong, a Politburo member)	State	Losang Jamcan 洛桑江村 བློ་བཟང་རྒྱལ་མཚན	
13 Vice Chairpersons of the Standing Committee of NPC (plus ranking vice chairperson Li Hongzhong, a Politburo member)	State	Shohrat Zakir雪克来提·扎克尔 شۆھرەت زاكىر	
2 State Councilors (plus 1 vice premier classified as a national leader, 3 vice premiers and 1 state councilor who are Politburo members, all listed above) (2 State Councilors dismissed from office)	State	~~Gen. Li Shangfu 李尚福~~	~~Minister of National Defense~~
2 State Councilors (plus 1 vice premier classified as a national leader, 3 vice premiers and 1 state councilor who are Politburo members, all listed above) (2 State Councilors dismissed from office)	State	Wu Zhenglong 吴政隆	Secretary-General of the State Council
2 State Councilors (plus 1 vice premier classified as a national leader, 3 vice premiers and 1 state councilor who are Politburo members, all listed above) (2 State Councilors dismissed from office)	State	Shen Yiqin 谌贻琴	President, All-China Women's Federation
2 State Councilors (plus 1 vice premier classified as a national leader, 3 vice premiers and 1 state councilor who are Politburo members, all listed above) (2 State Councilors dismissed from office)	State	~~Qin Gang 秦剛~~	~~Minister of Foreign Affairs (2022)~~
President of the Supreme People's Court	State	Zhang Jun 张军	
Procurator-General of the Supreme People's Procuratorate	State	Ying Yong 应勇	
22 Vice Chairperson of the National Committee of the Chinese People's Political Consultative Conference (plus one ranking vice chairperson Shi Taifeng, a member of the Politburo)	State	Hu Chunhua 胡春华	
22 Vice Chairperson of the National Committee of the Chinese People's Political Consultative Conference (plus one ranking vice chairperson Shi Taifeng, a member of the Politburo)	State	Shen Yueyue 沈跃跃	
22 Vice Chairperson of the National Committee of the Chinese People's Political Consultative Conference (plus one ranking vice chairperson Shi Taifeng, a member of the Politburo)	State	Wang Yong 王勇	
22 Vice Chairperson of the National Committee of the Chinese People's Political Consultative Conference (plus one ranking vice chairperson Shi Taifeng, a member of the Politburo)	State	Zhou Qiang 周强	
22 Vice Chairperson of the National Committee of the Chinese People's Political Consultative Conference (plus one ranking vice chairperson Shi Taifeng, a member of the Politburo)	State	Pagbalha Geleg Namgyai 帕巴拉·格列朗杰འཕགས་པ་ལྷ་དགེ་ལེགས་རྣམ་རྒྱལ་ (Note: A Vice Chair of the National Committee of CPPCC since 2003.)	(Not member of the CCP officially); Chair, Tibet Autonomous Regional Committee of the CCPCC (1993); 11th Qamdo Galden Jampaling Monastery Pagbalha Hutuktu of Tibetan Buddhism (1942)
22 Vice Chairperson of the National Committee of the Chinese People's Political Consultative Conference (plus one ranking vice chairperson Shi Taifeng, a member of the Politburo)	State	Edmund Ho Hau-wah 何厚铧 (Note: A Vice Chair of the National Committee of CPPCC since 2010.)	(Not member of the CCP officially)
22 Vice Chairperson of the National Committee of the Chinese People's Political Consultative Conference (plus one ranking vice chairperson Shi Taifeng, a member of the Politburo)	State	Leung Chun-ying 梁振英 (Note: A Vice Chair of the National Committee of CPPCC since 2017.)	(Not member of the CCP officially)
22 Vice Chairperson of the National Committee of the Chinese People's Political Consultative Conference (plus one ranking vice chairperson Shi Taifeng, a member of the Politburo)	State	Bagatur 巴特尔 (Note: A Vice Chair of the National Committee of CPPCC since 2018.)	
22 Vice Chairperson of the National Committee of the Chinese People's Political Consultative Conference (plus one ranking vice chairperson Shi Taifeng, a member of the Politburo)	State	Su Hui 苏辉	Chairwoman of the Taiwan Democratic Self-Government League (2018)
22 Vice Chairperson of the National Committee of the Chinese People's Political Consultative Conference (plus one ranking vice chairperson Shi Taifeng, a member of the Politburo)	State	Shao Hong 邵鸿	(Jiusan Society)
22 Vice Chairperson of the National Committee of the Chinese People's Political Consultative Conference (plus one ranking vice chairperson Shi Taifeng, a member of the Politburo)	State	Gao Yunlong 高云龙	(China Democratic National Construction Association)
22 Vice Chairperson of the National Committee of the Chinese People's Political Consultative Conference (plus one ranking vice chairperson Shi Taifeng, a member of the Politburo)	State	Chen Wu 陈武	
22 Vice Chairperson of the National Committee of the Chinese People's Political Consultative Conference (plus one ranking vice chairperson Shi Taifeng, a member of the Politburo)	State	Mu Hong 穆虹	
22 Vice Chairperson of the National Committee of the Chinese People's Political Consultative Conference (plus one ranking vice chairperson Shi Taifeng, a member of the Politburo)	State	Xian Hui 咸辉	
22 Vice Chairperson of the National Committee of the Chinese People's Political Consultative Conference (plus one ranking vice chairperson Shi Taifeng, a member of the Politburo)	State	Wang Dongfeng 王东峰	Secretary-General of the National Committee of the CPPCC
22 Vice Chairperson of the National Committee of the Chinese People's Political Consultative Conference (plus one ranking vice chairperson Shi Taifeng, a member of the Politburo)	State	Jiang Xinzhi 姜信治	
22 Vice Chairperson of the National Committee of the Chinese People's Political Consultative Conference (plus one ranking vice chairperson Shi Taifeng, a member of the Politburo)	State	Jiang Zuojun 蒋作君	Chair, China Zhi Gong Party (2022)
22 Vice Chairperson of the National Committee of the Chinese People's Political Consultative Conference (plus one ranking vice chairperson Shi Taifeng, a member of the Politburo)	State	He Baoxiang 何报翔	(Revolutionary Committee of the Chinese Kuomintang)
22 Vice Chairperson of the National Committee of the Chinese People's Political Consultative Conference (plus one ranking vice chairperson Shi Taifeng, a member of the Politburo)	State	Wang Guangqian 王光谦	(China Democratic League)
22 Vice Chairperson of the National Committee of the Chinese People's Political Consultative Conference (plus one ranking vice chairperson Shi Taifeng, a member of the Politburo)	State	Qin Boyong 秦博勇	(China Democratic National Construction Association)
22 Vice Chairperson of the National Committee of the Chinese People's Political Consultative Conference (plus one ranking vice chairperson Shi Taifeng, a member of the Politburo)	State	Zhu Yongxin 朱永新	(China Democratic League)
22 Vice Chairperson of the National Committee of the Chinese People's Political Consultative Conference (plus one ranking vice chairperson Shi Taifeng, a member of the Politburo)	State	Yang Zhen 杨震	(Chinese Peasants' and Workers' Democratic Party)

== Historical qualifying offices ==
In addition to the holders of the above office, historically, members of the standing committee of the Central Advisory Commission (existed between 1982 and 1992) were considered Party and State leaders. The 20 military leaders who were conferred titles of "Marshal of the People's Republic" and "Grand General of the People's Liberation Army" in 1955 were all considered former Party and State leaders when they were alive.

== See also ==
- Order of precedence in China
- List of leaders of the People's Republic of China
- List of current Chinese provincial leaders
