= Standing Committee of the 14th National Committee of the Chinese People's Political Consultative Conference =

Standing Committee of the 14th National Committee of the Chinese People's Political Consultative Conference 中国人民政治协商会议第十四届全国委员会常务委员会
- Emblem of the Chinese People's Political Consultative Conference

4 March 2023 (3 years, 202 days) – Overview
- Type: Permanent body of the advisory body

Leadership
- Chairman: Wang Huning
- Vice Chairmen: Shi Taifeng, Hu Chunhua, Shen Yueyue, Wang Yong, Zhou Qiang, Pagbalha Geleg Namgyai, Edmund Ho, Leung Chun-ying, Bagatur, Su Hui, Shao Hong, Gao Yunlong, Chen Wu, Mu Hong, Xian Hui, Wang Dongfeng, Jiang Xinzhi, Jiang Zuojun, He Baoxiang, Wang Guangqian, Qin Boyong, Zhu Yongxin, and Yang Zhen
- Secretary-General: Wang Dongfeng

Members
- Total: 299 members

The Standing Committee of the 14th National Committee of the Chinese People's Political Consultative Conference is current permanent body of the top political advisory body of the People's Republic of China. It has 323 members, including 24 chairpersons, vice chairpersons, and secretaries-general of the National Committee, and 299 standing committee members. All members were elected at the third plenary session of the first session of the 14th National Committee. The term of office is five years, from March 2023 to March 2028.

== Members ==
=== Chairman of the National Committee ===
- Wang Huning (Member of the Politburo Standing Committee of the Chinese Communist Party, Director of the Office of the Central Comprehensively Deepening Reform Commission, and Secretary of the Leading Party Members Group of the National Committee of the Chinese People's Political Consultative Conference)

=== Vice Chairpersons of the National Committee ===
1. Shi Taifeng (Member of the Politburo of the Chinese Communist Party, Member of the Secretariat of the CCP Central Committee, Head of the United Front Work Department of the CCP Central Committee, and Deputy Secretary of the Leading Party Members Group of the National Committee of the Chinese People's Political Consultative Conference)
2. Hu Chunhua (Member of the CCP Central Committee and Deputy Secretary of the Leading Party Group of the National Committee of the Chinese People's Political Consultative Conference)
3. Shen Yueyue (member of the CCP Central Committee, president of the All-China Women's Federation, and member of the Leading Party Group of the National Committee of the Chinese People's Political Consultative Conference)
4. Wang Yong (Member of the CCP Central Committee and Member of the Leading Party Group of the National Committee of the Chinese People's Political Consultative Conference)
5. Zhou Qiang (Member of the CCP Central Committee and Member of the Leading Party Group of the National Committee of the Chinese People's Political Consultative Conference)
6. Pagbalha Geleg Namgyal (Tibetan, Honorary President of the Buddhist Association of China, Chairman of the CPPCC Tibet Autonomous Region)
7. Edmund Ho
8. Leung Chun-ying
9. Bagatur (member of the CCP Central Committee, member of the Leading Party Group of the National Committee of the Chinese People's Political Consultative Conference)
10. Su Hui (Chairperson of the Central Committee of the Taiwan Democratic Self-Government League)
11. Shao Hong (Executive Vice Chairman of the Central Committee of the Jiusan Society)
12. Gao Yunlong (Chairman of the All-China Federation of Industry and Commerce, President of the China General Chamber of Commerce)
13. Chen Wu (member of the Leading Party Group of the National Committee of the Chinese People's Political Consultative Conference)
14. Mu Hong (Deputy Director of the Office of the Central Commission for Comprehensively Deepening Reform, in charge of daily work, and member of the Leading Party Group of the National Committee of the Chinese People's Political Consultative Conference)
15. Xian Hui (member of the Leading Party Group of the National Committee of the Chinese People's Political Consultative Conference)
16. Wang Dongfeng (Member of the Leading Party Group of the National Committee of the Chinese People's Political Consultative Conference (CPPCC), Secretary-General of the CPPCC National Committee and Secretary of the Leading Party Group of the CPPCC General Office)
17. Jiang Xinzhi (Deputy Head of the Organization Department of the CCP Central Committee in charge of day-to-day work, member of the Party Leadership Group of the National Committee of the Chinese People's Political Consultative Conference)
18. Jiang Zuojun (Chairman of the Central Committee of the China Zhi Gong Party)
19. He Baoxiang (Executive Vice Chairman of the Central Committee of the Revolutionary Committee of the Chinese Kuomintang)
20. Wang Guangqian (Executive Vice Chairman of the Central Committee of the China Democratic League, Vice President of Tsinghua University)
21. Qin Boyong (Executive Vice Chairman of the Central Committee of the China National Democratic Construction Association, Deputy Auditor General of the National Audit Office)
22. Zhu Yongxin (Executive Vice Chairman of the Central Committee of the China Association for Promoting Democracy)
23. Yang Zhen (Executive Vice Chairman of the Central Committee of the China National Democratic Construction Association)

=== Secretary General of the National Committee ===
- Wang Dongfeng (Vice Chairman and Secretary of the Leading Party Group of the National Committee of the Chinese People's Political Consultative Conference)

=== Members of the Standing Committee of the National Committee ===
Yi Xiaoguang, Ding Shizhong (Hui), Wan Jianmin, Ma Wenliang (Hani), Ma Junsheng, Ma Jiantang, Wang Ning (CCP), Wang Jun, Wang Chen, Wang Jun, Wang Xuan (female), Wang Rui, Wang Lu, Wang Biao (Dong), Wang Shijie, Wang Ercheng, Wang Hongling (female), Wang Zhigang, Wang Guosheng, Wang Jinnan, Wang Xuedian, Wang Jianjun (CCP), Wang Xiaodong, Wang Meixiang, Wang Huizhen (female), Wang Xinqiang, Wei Wei (female, Buyi), Wei Zhaohui (female, Zhuang), Zaxi Dawa (Tibetan), Che Jun, Fang Guanghua, Fang Jingyun, Hu Sishe, Kong Lingzhi, Deng Rongling (female), Shi Bi, Shi Aizhong, Long Zhuangwei (Miao), Lu Ke, Lu Guoyi, Shen Changyu, Tian Hongqi (female), Tian Qinxin (female), Ran Xia (female, Miao), Yin Hong (female), Feng Zhenglin, Ning Ji Zhe, Sima Hong (female), Jierla Yishamudin (Uyghur), Park Se-ryong (Korean), Cheng Yuechong, Bi Jingquan, Zhu Shenglin, Zhu Chengqing (female), Dorje Redan (Tibetan), Liu Yan (female), Liu Lei, Liu Cong, Liu Wanlong, Liu Zhongmin, Liu Tongde, Liu Xuguang, Liu Zhongfan, Liu Zhengkui, Liu Jieyi, Liu Xiaomei (female, Mongolian), Liu Jiayi, Liu Jiaqiang, Liu Yahuang, Liu Cigui, Liu Dewei, Qi Zhala (Tibetan), Qi Chengxi, Jiang Guangping, Jiang Erxiong (female), Jiang Liping, Xu Yousheng, Xu Jingjun, Ruan Chengfa, Ruan Shiwei, Sun Yao, Sun Yang, Sun Dongsheng, Sun Yeli, Sun Jiye, Shou Ziqi, Du Zhanyuan, Li Shan (religious community), Li Wei, Li Xin (female), Li Lin, Li Qun, Li Yao (female), Li Xiaopeng, Li Wenzhang, Li Shijie, Li Longxi(Korean ethnicity), Li Guangfu, Li Zhongping, Li Malin (female), Li Heping, Li Baoshan, Li Jiajie, Li Jiayang, Li Huidong (Hui ethnicity), Yang Jie, Yang Yunyan, Yang Faming (Hui ethnicity), Yang Guangyue (Naxi ethnicity), Yang Huayong, Yang Zhenbin, Yang Peijun, Wu Wei, Wu Weishan, Wu Lianghao, Wu Shezhou, ~~Wu Yingjie~~ (dismissed in July 2024), Wu Guohua (female), Wu Jianping, Qiu Dachang, Qiu Huadong, He Ping, He Zhimin, He Runsheng, He Chaoqiong (female), Dan Yanzheng, ~~Zou Jiayi (female)~~ (Resigned in August 2025), Zou Qiguo (Li nationality), Shen Bin, Song Tao, Song Yajun, Song Shuguang, Chi Zijian (female), Zhang Quan, Zhang Jie, Zhang Guangqi, Zhang Xingkai, Zhang Xinghai, Zhang Jinan, Zhang Kejian, Zhang Laibin, Zhang Lianqi, Zhang Bojun, Zhang Zhuohua, Zhang Yudong, Zhang Zongzhen, Zhang Baiqing, Zhang Fuming, Zhang Taolin, Zhang Xiaoming, Zhang Endi, Zhang Kuanshou (Bai nationality), Zhang Xueqiao, Zhang Yijiong, Zhang Fucheng, Zhang Zhenyu, Lu Guihua, Adilijiang Ajikelimu (Uyghur nationality), Chen Dong, Chen Xu (female), Chen Jun (female, Gaoshan ethnic group), Chen Yan, Chen Qun, Chen Xiaoping, ~~Chen Xiaojiang~~ (resigned in August 2025), Chen Malin, Chen Fengfuzhen (female), Chen Baosheng, Chen Xingying (female), Chen Guiyun, Chen Run'er, Wu Xiangping, Miao Wei, Gou Zhongwen, Fan Jiulun, Lin Duo, Lin Jianyue, Lin Yifu, Ouyang Minggao, Ouyang Zehua, Shang Yong, Shang Xunwu, Yi Jun, Yi Gang, Pasonglie Longzhuangmeng (Dai ethnic group), Jin Shi, Zhou Hanmin, Zhou Zhonghe, Zheng He, Zheng Yongfei, Fang Xingyao, Zhao Ji, Zhao Wen(Female), Zhao Jing (female, Jiusan Society), Zhao Zongqi, Zhao Jiajun, Zhao Deming (Yao), Hu Gang, Hu Zejun (female), Nan Cunhui, Haderbek Hamza (Kazakh), Hou Maofeng, Shi Ronghuai, Hong Jiexu, Hong Huimin, Zhu Chunxiu (female, Yi), Yao Zhisheng, Yao Aixing, Qin Shunquan, Zhukang Tudeng Kezhu (Tibetan), Panchen Erdeni Queji Jiebu (Tibetan), Yuan Yaxiang, Nie Chenxi, Jia Nan (female), Jia Qingguo, Xia Jie (female, Hui), Xia Xianpeng, Qian Feng (Jiusan Society), Qian Feng (Welfare and Social Security), Qian Keming, Qian Xueming, Qian Zhimin, Ni Jinren, Xu Tao, Xu Bin, Xu Lingyi, Xu Lejiang, Xu Yanhao, Xu Qifang, Xu Xiaolan (female), Xu Xiaohong, Luan Xin (female), Gao Jin, Gao Feng, Gao Xiaomei (Female), Gao Yongwen, Gao Xiumei (female), Gao Hongjun, Guo Naishuo, Xi Nanhua, Tang Yingnian, Tang Chengpei, Tao Zhi (Manchu), Tao Kaiyuan (female), Huang Wei, Huang Wu, Huang Rong, Huang Zhen, Huang Yuguang, Huang Liyun (female, Dai), Huang Guoxian, Huang Liuquan, Huang Runqiu, Cao Weixing, Gong Jianming, Gong Junlong, Sheng Bin, Chang Kai, Cui Shichang, Fu Zhiguan, Kang Yaohong, Sui Jun (female), Ge Huibo, Ge Junbo, Ge Jiantuan, Dong Yaopeng, Jiang Xuguang, Jiang Jianguo, Han Weiguo, Han Liping, Cheng Hong (female), Cheng Kai, Cheng Ping (female), Cheng Yongbo (Manchu), Fu Zhenbang, Jiao Hong (female), Shu Hongbing, Xie Hong (female), Xie Ru (female), Xie Xiaoliang, Lai Ming, Lai Mingyong, Xie Dong (female), Cai Wei, Cai Mingzhao, Cai Xiujun, Cai Guanshen, Liao Changjiang, Yan JueTan Tieniu, Tan Jinqiu, Fan Jie, Li Changjin, Teng Shujing (female, Tujia ethnic group), Pan Ligang, Yan Ying (female), Huo Weiping, Huo Jinhua (female), Wei Gang

== Meetings ==
| Meeting | Date | Agenda | Ref. |
|---|---|---|---|
| | March 3, 2023 – March 11, 2023 | The first session of the 14th National Committee of the Chinese People's Political Consultative Conference | |
| | March 3, 2023 – March 11, 2023 | The agenda of the meeting was: 1. To hear and deliberate on the work report of the Standing Committee of the National Committee of the Chinese People's Political Consultative Conference; 2. To hear and deliberate on 3. the report of the Standing Committee of the National Committee of the CPPCC on the handling of proposals 4. To attend the first session of the 14th National People's Congress and hear and discuss the government work report and other relevant reports 5. To deliberate and adopt the amendment to the Constitution of the CPPCC; 6. To elect the Chairman, Vice-Chairmen, Secretary-General, and Standing Committee members of the 14th National Committee of the CPPCC; 7. To deliberate and adopt the political resolution of the First Session of the 14th National Committee of the CPPCC; 8. To deliberate and adopt the resolution of the first session of the 14th National Committee of the CPPCC on the work report of the Standing Committee; 9. To deliberate and adopt the resolution of the first session of the 14th National Committee of the CPPCC on the handling of proposals 10. To deliberate and adopt the report of the Proposals Examination Committee of the First Session of the 14th National Committee of the CPPCC on the examination of proposals submitted to the First Session of the 14th National Committee of the CPPCC | |
| 1st | March 12, 2023 – March 13, 2023 | The agenda for the first meeting of the Standing Committee of the 14th National Committee of the Chinese People's Political Consultative Conference (CPPCC) was reviewed and approved.; Hearing an explanation of the draft decision of the Standing Committee of the 14th National Committee of the Chinese People's Political Consultative Conference (CPPCC) on establishing special committees.; Hearing an explanation of the draft list of chairpersons and vice-chairpersons of the special committees of the 14th National Committee of the Chinese People's Political Consultative Conference (CPPCC).; The Standing Committee of the 14th National Committee of the Chinese People's Political Consultative Conference (CPPCC) reviewed and adopted the decision on establishing special committees, deciding to establish ten special committees: the Proposals Committee, the Economic Committee, the Agriculture and Rural Affairs Committee, the Population, Resources and Environment Committee, the Education, Science, Health and Sports Committee, the Social and Legal Affairs Committee, the Ethnic and Religious Affairs Committee, the Hong Kong, Macao, Taiwan and Overseas Chinese Affairs Committee, the Foreign Affairs Committee, and the Culture, History and Learning Committee.; The list of appointed deputy secretaries-general of the 14th National Committee of the Chinese People's Political Consultative Conference (CPPCC) and the list of directors and deputy directors of its special committees were reviewed and approved. | |
| 2nd | June 26, 2023 – June 27, 2023 | Consultative suggestions on "building a new development pattern and advancing Chinese-style modernization" | |
| 3rd | August 22, 2023 – August 24, 2023 | Consultation and deliberation on "improving the science and technology innovation system and accelerating the implementation of the innovation-driven development strategy" | |
| 4th | October 31, 2023 – November 2, 2023 | The revised "Regulations on the Work of Proposals of the National Committee of the Chinese People's Political Consultative Conference" were adopted through consultation and deliberation on the theme of "strengthening ecological and environmental protection and promoting the construction of a beautiful China". | |
| 5th | March 1, 2024 – March 2, 2024 | The meeting: reviewed and approved the decision to convene the Second Session of the 14th National Committee of the Chinese People's Political Consultative Conference (CPPCC); heard a report from the CPPCC National Committee Chairman's Meeting on the work of the CPPCC since the First Session of the 14th CPPCC National Committee; reviewed and approved the agenda and schedule of the Second Session of the 14th CPPCC National Committee; reviewed and approved the work report of the Standing Committee of the CPPCC National Committee; reviewed and approved the report on the handling of proposals since the First Session of the 14th CPPCC National Committee; heard reports from the Economic Committee, Agriculture and Rural Affairs Committee, Population, Resources and Environment Committee, Education, Science, Health and Sports Committee, Social and Legal Affairs Committee, Ethnic and Religious Affairs Committee, Hong Kong, Macao, Taiwan and Overseas Chinese Committee, Foreign Affairs Committee, and Culture, History and Learning Committee of the 14th CPPCC National Committee on their work in 2023; and reviewed and approved the list of the Secretary-General and Deputy Secretaries-General of the Second Session of the 14th CPPCC National Committee. | |
| | March 4, 2024 – March 10, 2024 | The second session of the 14th National Committee of the Chinese People's Political Consultative Conference | |
| | March 4, 2024 – March 10, 2024 | The agenda of the meeting was: 1. To hear and deliberate on the work report of the Standing Committee of the National Committee of the Chinese People's Political Consultative Conference (CPPCC); 2. To hear and deliberate on the report of the Standing Committee of the National Committee of the CPPCC on the handling of proposals since the First Session of the 14th CPPCC National Committee; 3. To attend the second session of the 14th National People's Congress as observers, and to hear and discuss the government work report and other relevant reports 4. To deliberate and adopt the political resolution of the Second Session of the 14th CPPCC National Committee; 5. To deliberate and adopt the resolution of the Second Session of the 14th CPPCC National Committee on the work report of the Standing Committee; 6. To deliberate and adopt the resolution of the Second Session of the 14th CPPCC National Committee on the report on the handling of proposals since the First Session of the 14th CPPCC National Committee; 7. To deliberate and adopt the report of the Proposals Committee of the 14th CPPCC National Committee on the examination of proposals submitted to the Second Session of the 14th CPPCC National Committee | |
| 6th | March 9, 2024 | The meeting: heard reports on the discussion and revision of relevant draft documents; adopted the draft resolution on the work report of the Standing Committee of the 14th CPPCC National Committee; adopted the draft resolution on the report on the handling of proposals since the first session of the 14th CPPCC National Committee; adopted the draft report on the examination of proposals submitted to the second session of the 14th CPPCC National Committee by the Proposals Committee of the 14th CPPCC National Committee; and; adopted the draft political resolution of the second session of the 14th CPPCC National Committee. | |
| 7th | June 4, 2024 – June 6, 2024 | Consultation and deliberation on "building a high-level socialist market economy system" | |
| 8th | July 23, 2024 – July 25, 2024 | Conveying and studying the spirit of the Third Plenary Session of the 20th CCP Central Committee | |
| 9th | October 9, 2024 – October 11, 2024 | We will thoroughly study and implement the spirit of General Secretary Xi Jinping's important speech at the ceremony celebrating the 75th anniversary of the founding of the Chinese People's Political Consultative Conference, and conduct consultations and deliberations on the theme of "Promoting cultural confidence and self-reliance, and forging a new brilliance for socialist culture". | |
| 10th | March 1, 2025 – March 2, 2025 | The meeting: reviewed and approved the decision to convene the Third Session of the 14th CPPCC National Committee; heard the report of the CPPCC National Committee Chairman's Meeting on the work of the CPPCC in 2024; reviewed and approved the draft agenda and schedule of the third session of the 14th National Committee of the CPPCC; reviewed and approved the work report of the Standing Committee of the CPPCC National Committee; reviewed and approved the report on the handling of proposals since the Second Session of the 14th CPPCC National Committee; heard reports on the work of the Economic Committee, Agriculture and Rural Affairs Committee, Population, Resources and Environment Committee, Education, Science, Health and Sports Committee, Social and Legal Affairs Committee, Ethnic and Religious Affairs Committee, Hong Kong, Macao, Taiwan and Overseas Chinese Committee, Foreign Affairs Committee, and Culture, History and Learning Committee of the 14th CPPCC National Committee in 2024; and; reviewed and approved the list of the Secretary-General and Deputy Secretaries-General of the Third Session of the 14th National Committee of the CPPCC. | |
| | March 4, 2025 – March 10, 2025 | The third session of the 14th National Committee of the Chinese People's Political Consultative Conference | |
| | March 4, 2025 – March 10, 2025 | The agenda of the meeting was: 1. To hear and deliberate on the work report of the Standing Committee of the National Committee of the Chinese People's Political Consultative Conference; 2. To hear and deliberate on the report of the Standing Committee of the CPPCC National Committee on the handling of proposals since the Second Session of the 14th CPPCC National Committee; 3. To attend the Third Session of the 14th National People's Congress (NPC) as observers, and to hear and discuss the government work report and other relevant reports 4. To deliberate and adopt the political resolution of the Third Session of the 14th CPPCC National Committee; 5. To deliberate and adopt the resolution of the Third Session of the 14th CPPCC National Committee on the work report of the Standing Committee; 6. To deliberate and adopt the resolution of the Third Session of the 14th CPPCC National Committee on the report on the handling of proposals since the Second Session of the 14th CPPCC National Committee; 7. To deliberate and adopt the report of the Proposals Committee of the 14th CPPCC National Committee on the examination of proposals submitted to the Third Session of the 14th CPPCC National Committee | |
| 11th | March 9, 2025 | The meeting: heard reports on the deliberation and revision of relevant draft documents, adopted the draft resolution of the Third Session of the 14th National Committee of the Chinese People's Political Consultative Conference (CPPCC) on the Work Report of the Standing Committee; adopted the draft resolution of the Third Session of the 14th National Committee of the CPPCC on the Report on the Handling of Proposals Since the Second Session of the 14th CPPCC National Committee; adopted the draft report of the Proposals Committee of the 14th National Committee of the CPPCC on the Examination of Proposals from the Third Session of the 14th CPPCC National Committee; and; adopted the draft political resolution of the Third Session of the 14th National Committee of the CPPCC. | |
| 12th | June 23, 2025 – June 25, 2025 | Consultation and deliberation on "further deepening economic system reform and advancing Chinese-style modernization" | |
| 13th | August 25, 2025 – August 26, 2025 | Consultation and deliberation on "formulating the 15th Five-Year Plan for National Economic and Social Development" | |
| 14th | October 31, 2025 – November 1, 2025 | Conveying and studying the spirit of the fourth plenary session of the 20th CCP Central Committee | |
