= Order of precedence in China =

Relative preeminence of officials for ceremonial purposes

In China, political leaders are ranked for event protocols and the ordering of names in official news bulletins, written and televised. It is also sometimes used to assess perceived political power. Although there is no formally published ranking, there is usually an established convention and protocol, and the relative positions of Chinese political figures can usually be deduced from the order in meetings and especially by the time and order in which figures are covered by the official media. Since 1982, the General Secretary of the Chinese Communist Party has been the highest-ranking official in the People's Republic of China (PRC).

Depending on the person and the time period, the hierarchy will vary accordingly. Since the 1980s, Chinese political positions have become increasingly institutionalized. However, part of the power Chinese leaders carry still derives from who they are, rather than what position they hold.

Individuals can hold multiple top leadership titles but also be unable to claim to be the de facto head as was the case with Chairman of the Chinese Communist Party Hua Guofeng, when "paramount leader" Deng Xiaoping was present. The traditional ranking system was based upon the hierarchical line of the Politburo Standing Committee of the Chinese Communist Party. The names on this list includes all those officially considered party and state leaders.

== Order of precedence ==
=== Applications of protocol ===
The Order of Precedence has gradually become normalized as the institutions of the Chinese Communist Party (CCP) and the People's Republic became more established and stable. Internal publications and official media adhere to strict ranking protocol when reporting news items or public announcements that involve multiple leaders. Similarly, the order is strictly adhered to when seating leaders at official meetings and functions.

Often, state media news programs, such as Xinwen Lianbo, overlook the actual importance of the story attached to each leader. Rather the news order is determined by political ranking alone. For instance, if a higher-ranked leader is chairing a routine meeting, while a lower-ranked leader is visiting an earthquake disaster zone, the routine meeting will take precedence over the disaster in the order that they are reported.

Protocol ordering of leaders is perhaps most visible at large gatherings of party and state leaders, such as Party Congresses, National People's Congresses, the funeral or memorial service of former leaders, or major anniversary celebrations.

The current order of precedence applies to party, state, and military leaders. It generally follows an order set out by the institutions to which these leaders belong; further ranking of individual leaders are applied within each of the institutions. Where an individual belongs to numerous party and state institutions, they are usually only mentioned on first instance for their highest-ranking post. Since China is a single-party communist state, the General Secretary of the Chinese Communist Party is generally considered to hold the highest position in the political system.

=== Order of institutions ===
The organs of the party, state, and military, have a generally applied rank order, as follows:

1. Central Committee of the Chinese Communist Party
  1. Politburo
    1. Standing Committee of the Politburo
  2. Central Secretariat
2. Highest state power and legislative organ: National People's Congress (NPC)
  1. Standing Committee of the National People's Congress (NPCSC)
3. Presidency (as a state organ)
4. Highest executive organ: State Council
5. Top-level united front organisation:
  National Committee of the Chinese People's Political Consultative Conference (CPPCC)
6. Highest military organ: Central Military Commission (CMC), "one institution bearing two names":
  1. The CMC of the Chinese Communist Party
  2. The CMC of the People's Republic of China
7. Highest supervisory organs (two institutions sharing one office):
  1. Central Commission for Discipline Inspection (CCDI)
  2. National Supervisory Commission of the People's Republic of China (NSC)
8. Highest judicial organs:
  1. Supreme People's Court (SPC)
  2. Supreme People's Procuratorate (SPP)

=== Order of leaders ===
==== Order of names in official news ====
1. Current members of the CCP Politburo Standing Committee, normally including:
  1. General Secretary of the CCP Central Committee
  2. President of the People's Republic of China
  3. Premier of the State Council
  4. Chairperson of the NPC Standing Committee
  5. Chairperson of the CPPCC National Committee
  6. Chairman of the Central Military Commission
  7. Other members of the Politburo Standing Committee, normally including:
    - First-ranked Secretary of the CCP Central Secretariat
    - Secretary of the Central Commission for Discipline Inspection
    - First-ranked Vice Premier of the State Council
2. Vice President
3. Other current members of the Politburo, normally including:
  - Vice Premiers of the State Council
  - Vice Chairmen of the Central Military Commission
4. Former General Secretary of the CCP Central Committee
5. Former members of the Central Politburo Standing Committee
6. Vice Premiers of the State Council (if not in the Politburo)
7. Vice Chairmen of the Central Military Commission (if not in the Politburo)
8. Current Members of the CCP Central Secretariat
9. Vice Chairpersons of the NPC Standing Committee
10. State Councilors
11. Director of the National Supervisory Commission
12. President of the Supreme People's Court
13. Procurator-General of the Supreme People's Procuratorate
14. Vice Chairpersons of the CPPCC National Committee, at the bottom of the list of the current national-level "Leaders of the Party and the State" (党和国家领导人)
15. Retired "Leaders of the Party and the State", except former members of the Politburo Standing Committee, ranked by the highest office they held, repeating the same order above.
16. Central Military Commission members except chairpersons and vice chairpersons are not considered national-level "Leaders of the Party and State" but merely leaders of the People's Liberation Army, and generally listed separately by protocol.
  1. Current CMC members (except chairmen and vice-chairmen)
  2. Former CMC members (except chairmen and vice-chairmen)
17. Provincial-ministerial level officials

==== Order of seats ====
1. Current General Secretary of the CCP Central Committee
2. Former General Secretary of the CCP Central Committee
3. Current members of the CCP Politburo Standing Committee except General Secretary, normally including:
  1. President of the People's Republic of China
  2. Premier of the State Council
  3. Chairperson of the NPC Standing Committee
  4. Chairperson of the CPPCC National Committee
  5. Chairman of the Central Military Commission
  6. Other members of the Politburo Standing Committee, normally including:
    - First-ranked Secretary of the CCP Central Secretariat
    - Secretary of the Central Commission for Discipline Inspection
    - First-ranked Vice Premier of the State Council
4. Vice President
5. Former members of the Politburo Standing Committee
6. Other current members of the Politburo, normally including:
  - Vice Premiers of the State Council
  - Vice Chairmen of the Central Military Commission
7. Vice Premiers of the State Council (if not in the Politburo)
8. Vice Chairmen of the Central Military Commission (if not in the Politburo)
9. Current Members of the CCP Central Secretariat
10. Vice Chairpersons of the National People's Congress Standing Committee
11. State Councilors
12. Director of the National Supervisory Commission
13. Presidents of the Supreme People's Court
14. Procurators-General of the Supreme People's Procuratorate
15. Vice Chairpersons of the CPPCC National Committee, at the bottom of the list of the current national-level "Leaders of the Party and the State" (党和国家领导人)
16. Retired "Leaders of the Party and the State", except former members of the Politburo Standing Committee, ranked by the highest office they held, repeating the same order above.
17. Central Military Commission members except chairpersons and vice-chairpersons are not considered national-level "Leaders of the Party and State" but merely leaders of the People's Liberation Army.
  1. Current CMC members (except chairmen and vice-chairmen)
  2. Former CMC members (except chairmen and vice-chairmen)
18. Provincial-ministerial level officials

NB:

- The ranking of a Vice President of the PRC is normally based on whether he is a current or former Politburo Standing Committee member or other member of the Politburo. Press coverage of the March 2018 National People's Congress ranked the new Vice President Wang Qishan immediately after the Standing Committee, from which he recently retired.

=== National Leaders ===
National leaders are ranked based on the offices they hold, their seniority, or sometimes simply their perceived personal prestige. During the Mao years, ranking of leaders was fairly arbitrary. For instance, during the Cultural Revolution, Mao himself dictated the exact protocol sequence depending on who was held in favour at the time. (Note: At the 11th Plenum of the 8th Central Committee in 1966, for example, Liu Shaoqi was demoted from second to eighth on the party hierarchy on personal orders from Mao, but retained the office of state president.)

Since 1982, rankings gradually stabilized and more consistent patterns could be observed. For instance, the General Secretary of the Chinese Communist Party always ranked first in the protocol sequence. This is despite the fact that some General Secretaries were not the pre-eminent political leaders. For example, General Secretaries Hu Yaobang and Zhao Ziyang (both ranked first) were, in practice, subordinate to "paramount leader" Deng Xiaoping, who was ranked behind them in protocol. Deng at the time served as Chairman of the Central Military Commission and was ranked second overall in the leadership hierarchy.

The President is a largely ceremonial post, but it is typically ranked immediately after the General Secretary and before other offices of the state. (Note: See for example the rankings of national leaders during the memorial ceremony of the Panchen Lama held in 1989; at this event, the ordering of leaders was Zhao Ziyang (as General Secretary), Yang Shangkun (as President), Li Peng (as Premier), Wan Li (as NPC Chair), Li Xiannian (as CPPCC chair), Qiao Shi (as a member of the Politburo Standing Committee).) When the President and General Secretary are two different people (prior to 1993, and in brief interregnums in 2003 and 2013), the President is ranked second to the General Secretary. Between 1982 and 1987, the President ranked after the Premier. (Note: For example, at the funeral of Ye Jianying in 1986, the order of leaders appeared as Hu Yaobang (as General Secretary), Deng Xiaoping (as CMC Chair), Zhao Ziyang (as Premier), Li Xiannian (as President), Chen Yun.)

After the President, the Chairman of the Standing Committee of the National People's Congress, the Premier, and the Chairman of the National Committee of the Chinese People's Political Consultative Conference follow; this ordering seems to supersede the Standing Committee order when officeholders are not themselves part of the Standing Committee, although typically since 1993 the heads of the "four national bodies" are concurrently members of the Standing Committee. Between 1997 and 2002, NPC Chair Li Peng was ranked second. During the same period, the Premier, Zhu Rongji, as head of government, was ranked third. The Chairman of the National Committee of the Chinese People's Political Consultative Conference (CPPCC) was ranked fourth. This ordering remained consistent between 2002 and 2012, when NPC Chair Wu Bangguo ranked above Premier Wen Jiabao. However, in 2013, this ordering changed. The Premier, Li Keqiang, was ranked 2nd, immediately after the General Secretary, and in front of the NPC Chairman Zhang Dejiang.

The Politburo Standing Committee of the Chinese Communist Party, colloquially called the Zhengzhiju Changweihui in Chinese, is the apex of political power in China. Its members (Zhengzhiju Changwei) are strictly ranked. The heads of the four national bodies typically occupy the top four ranking spots of the Standing Committee. The other members of the Standing Committee are ranked immediately after them. The rankings of the remaining Standing Committee members are determined by a combination of the offices they hold and their seniority. For example, Li Changchun served as a Standing Committee member with no strictly defined office between 2002 and 2012; between 2002 and 2007, he was ranked eighth in protocol sequence, but in 2007, having now served one term on the body, his rank rose to fifth, immediately after CPPCC chair Jia Qinglin and in front of putative successor and executive secretary of the Secretariat Xi Jinping.

The current ranking of the Politburo Standing Committee is as follows:

Members of the Standing Committee of the Political Bureau of the 20th Central Committee of the Chinese Communist Party
Rank	Portrait	Name	Hanzi	19th PSC	Birth	PM	Birthplace	Academic attainment	No. of offices	Ref.
1	Xi Jinping	Xi Jinping	习近平	Old	1953	1974	Beijing	Graduate: Doctoral degree in Marxist legal studies; Undergraduate degree in chemical engineering	Eleven: Party offices; General Secretary, Central Committee; Chairman, National Security Commission of the Central Committee; Chairman, Central Comprehensively Deepening Reforms Commission of the Central Committee; Head, Central Leading Group for Taiwan Affairs of the Central Committee; Head, Central Leading Group for Financial and Economic Work of the Central Committee; Head, Central Leading Group for Network Security and Information Technology of the Central Committee; Military offices; Chairman, Central Military Commission; Commander-in-chief, Joint Operations Command Center of the Central Military Commission of the People's Liberation Army; Head, Leading Group for National Defence and Military Reform of the Central Military Commission; Head, Office of the Central Integrated Military-Civilian Development Committee; State offices; President of China	
2	Li Qiang	Li Qiang	李强	New	1959	1983	Zhejiang	Graduate: Master's degree in business administration; Graduate programme in world economics; Graduate programme in engineering management; Undergraduate degree in agricultural mechanisation	Eight: Party offices; Director, Central Institutional Organisation Commission; Deputy director, Central Comprehensively Deepening Reforms Commission; Deputy director, Central Financial and Economic Affairs Commission; Deputy director, Central Cyberspace Affairs Commission; Deputy director, Central Foreign Affairs Commission; Leader, Central Leading Group for Climate Change and Emissions Reduction; Leader, State Council Leading Party Members Group; State offices; Premier, State Council of China	
3	Zhao Leji	Zhao Leji	赵乐际	Old	1957	1975	Qinghai	Graduate: Graduate programme in currency and banking; Undergraduate degree in philosophy	One: State office; Chairman, Standing Committee of the National People's Congress	
4	Wang Huning	Wang Huning	王沪宁	Old	1955	1984	Shanghai	Graduate: Master's degree in Marxist legal studies; Graduate programme in international politics; Undergraduate degree in French	One: Organisational office; Chairman, National Committee of the Chinese People's Political Consultative Conference	
5	Cai Qi	Cai Qi	蔡奇	New	1955	1975	Fujian	Graduate: Doctoral degree in political economy; Post-graduate degree in economic law; Undergraduate degree in political education	Three: Party offices; First Secretary, Secretariat of the Central Committee; Director, General Office of the Central Committee; Director, Office of the General Secretary of the Central Committee	
6	Ding Xuexiang	Ding Xuexiang	丁薛祥	New	1962	1984	Jiangsu	Graduate: Master's degree in science and management; Bachelor's degree in engineering	One: State offices; First-Ranked Vice Premier of the State Council	
7	Li Xi	Li Xi	李希	New	1956	1982	Gansu	Graduate: Master's degree in economics and management; Undergraduate degree in literature	Two: Party offices; Secretary, Standing Committee of the Central Commission for Discipline Inspection; Director, Central Leading Group for Inspection Work	

=== Vice president ===
Between 2018 and 2023, Vice President Wang Qishan, himself a former member of the Politburo Standing Committee, has been placed in front of the other members of the Politburo and in front of former leaders, and immediately after the sitting Politburo Standing Committee members. After Wang Qishan retired in 2023, his successor Han Zheng, is also a former member of the Politburo Standing Committee, which placed Han in the same rank as Wang.

=== Other members of the CCP Politburo ===
From its early history, the Politburo was theoretically a "leadership collective", with equal status accorded to each of its members. In practice, the Politburo Standing Committee members have elevated status within the body and are considered its most important and powerful members. When a new Politburo member list is first announced, or when the Politburo membership is being reported independently of other bodies, it is ordered by "the number of strokes in the surname character", a traditional method of 'alphabetization' of Chinese names; in these cases, all Politburo members, including PSC members, are named in this sequence. Unlike the PSC, Politburo members are not ranked based on presumed level of power. When it comes to seating protocol and official announcements about the Politburo in conjunction with other party and state bodies, the Politburo Standing Committee members are announced first, before the rest of the Politburo members.

The members of the Politburo Standing Committee are also Politburo members; since they are already named above, they are omitted from this list

- Ma Xingrui, former party secretary of Xinjiang
- Wang Yi, Director of the Office of the Central Foreign Affairs Commission and Minister of Foreign Affairs
- Yin Li, party secretary of Beijing
- Shi Taifeng, head of the United Front Work Department
- Liu Guozhong, vice premier of the State Council
- Li Ganjie, head of the Organization Department
- Li Shulei, head of the Publicity Department
- Li Hongzhong, first-ranked vice chairman of the National People's Congress Standing Committee
- He Lifeng, vice premier of the State Council
- Zhang Youxia, vice chairman of the Central Military Commission
- Zhang Guoqing, vice premier of the State Council
- Chen Wenqing, secretary of the Central Political and Legal Affairs Commission
- Chen Jining, party secretary of Shanghai
- Chen Min'er, party secretary of Tianjin
- Yuan Jiajun, party secretary of Chongqing
- Huang Kunming, party secretary of Guangdong

=== Living former members of the Politburo Standing Committee ===
Immediately following the 16th Party Congress, Jiang Zemin was ranked 2nd overall on the leadership protocol hierarchy, immediately after Hu Jintao. At the conclusion of the 18th Party Congress, when Hu Jintao retired as General Secretary, Jiang was ranked 2nd overall, after Xi Jinping, and Hu Jintao was ranked 3rd, after Jiang. Since 2013, judging mostly based on the official obituary notices of various deceased party officials, Hu seems to have progressively moved "lower" on the protocol strata, first below all current members of the Politburo Standing Committee, and as of 2014, behind all members of the sitting Politburo.

At major functions, Jiang and Hu sat immediately next to Xi Jinping, visually giving them prominence over the other Politburo Standing Committee members on television footage. However, in the official bulletins of the functions, the names of Jiang and Hu were announced after all sitting members of the Politburo. This convention was used at the National Day banquet held on September 30, 2014, the 2015 China Victory Day Parade atop Tiananmen Gate, the opening session of the 19th Party Congress in October 2017, the military parade at 70th anniversary of the People's Republic of China in October 2019, 100th Anniversary of the Chinese Communist Party in July 2021, the opening session of the 20th Party Congress in October 2022, and Jiang Zemin's funeral in December 2022.

Former Politburo Standing Committee members who were not "in good standing" in official party evaluations are not included in this list; this includes those ousted from positions of power but not formally expelled from the party. For instance, Zhao Ziyang and Hua Guofeng were typically omitted from this list when they were alive. Zhou Yongkang, who was convicted on corruption charges in 2015, was also removed from this list. Hu Qili is omitted from this list.

Name	Image	Born	Joined Party	Former highest post(s)	Retired
Hu Jintao		1942	1964	General Secretary of the Chinese Communist Party; President of China; Chairman of the Central Military Commission	2013
Zhu Rongji		1928	1949	Member of the CCP Politburo Standing Committee; Premier of China	2003
Li Ruihuan		1934	1959	Member of the CCP Politburo Standing Committee; Chairman of the CPPCC National Committee	2003
Wen Jiabao		1942	1965	Member of the CCP Politburo Standing Committee; Premier of China	2013
Jia Qinglin		1940	1959	Member of the CCP Politburo Standing Committee; Chairman of the CPPCC National Committee	2013
Zhang Dejiang		1946	1971	Member of the CCP Politburo Standing Committee; Chairman of the NPC Standing Committee	2018
Yu Zhengsheng		1945	1964	Member of the CCP Politburo Standing Committee; Chairman of the CPPCC National Committee	2018
Li Zhanshu		1950	1975	Member of the CCP Politburo Standing Committee; Chairman of the NPC Standing Committee	2023
Wang Yang		1955	1975	Member of the CCP Politburo Standing Committee; Chairman of the CPPCC National Committee	2023
Song Ping		1917	1937	Member of the CCP Politburo Standing Committee	1992
Li Lanqing		1932	1952	Member of the CCP Politburo Standing Committee; Vice Premier of China	2003
Zeng Qinghong		1939	1960	Member of the CCP Politburo Standing Committee; First Secretary of the CCP Central Secretariat; Vice President of China	2008
Wu Guanzheng		1938	1962	Member of the CCP Politburo Standing Committee; Secretary of the CCP Central Commission for Discipline Inspection	2007
Li Changchun		1944	1965	Member of the CCP Politburo Standing Committee; Chairman of Central Guidance Commission on Building Spiritual Civilization	2012
Luo Gan		1935	1960	Member of the CCP Politburo Standing Committee; Secretary of the CCP Central Political and Legislative Affairs Committee	2007
He Guoqiang		1943	1966	Member of the CCP Politburo Standing Committee; Secretary of the CCP Central Commission for Discipline Inspection	2012
Liu Yunshan		1947	1971	Member of the CCP Politburo Standing Committee; First Secretary of the CCP Central Secretariat; Chairman of Central Guidance Commission on Building Spiritual Civilization	2017
Wang Qishan		1948	1983	Member of the CCP Politburo Standing Committee; Secretary of the CCP Central Commission for Discipline Inspection; Vice President of China	2023
Zhang Gaoli		1946	1973	Member of the CCP Politburo Standing Committee; Vice Premier of China	2018

=== Secretaries of the CCP Secretariat ===
- Cai Qi (included earlier in the order of precedence as a member of the Politburo Standing Committee)
- Shi Taifeng (included earlier in the order of precedence as a member of the Politburo)
- Li Ganjie (included earlier in the order of precedence as a member of the Politburo)
- Li Shulei (included earlier in the order of precedence as a member of the Politburo)
- Chen Wenqing (included earlier in the order of precedence as a member of the Politburo)
- Liu Jinguo
- Wang Xiaohong

=== Vice Chairman of the Central Military Commission ===
- Zhang Youxia (included earlier in the order of precedence as a member of the Politburo)
- Zhang Shengmin

=== Vice Chairpersons of the National People's Congress Standing Committee ===
- Li Hongzhong (included earlier in the order of precedence as a member of the Politburo)
- Wang Dongming
- Xiao Jie
- Zheng Jianbang
- Ding Zhongli
- Hao Mingjin
- Cai Dafeng
- He Wei
- Wu Weihua
- Tie Ning
- Peng Qinghua
- Zhang Qingwei
- Losang Jamcan
- Shohrat Zakir

=== State Councilors, Supervisory Chief, and Judiciary Chiefs ===
- State Councilors (in order of rank)
  - Wang Xiaohong (included earlier in the order of precedence as a secretary of the Secretariat)
  - Wu Zhenglong
  - Shen Yiqin
- Director of the National Supervisory Commission (Liu Jinguo) (included earlier in the order of precedence as a secretary of the Secretariat)
- President of the Supreme People's Court (Zhang Jun)
- Procurator-General of the Supreme People's Procuratorate (Ying Yong)

=== Vice Chairpersons of the CPPCC National Committee ===
In the following order:

- Shi Taifeng (included earlier in the order of precedence as a member of the Politburo)
- Hu Chunhua
- Shen Yueyue
- Wang Yong
- Zhou Qiang
- Pagbalha Geleg Namgyai
- Edmund Ho
- Leung Chun-ying
- Bagatur
- Su Hui
- Shao Hong
- Gao Yunlong
- Chen Wu
- Mu Hong
- Xian Hui
- Wang Dongfeng
- Jiang Xinzhi
- Jiang Zuojun
- He Baoxiang
- Wang Guangqian
- Qin Boyong
- Zhu Yongxin
- Yang Zhen

=== Members of the Central Military Commission ===
- Liu Zhenli

== Former national leaders ==
Each year, state media releases a list of "old comrades" that the current cohort of leaders would pay their respects to during the days leading up to Chinese New Year. These leaders are strictly ranked based on the hierarchy of their positions during their last term in office. In general, these rankings follow the rules as set out below:

- Those who held paramount leadership
- Those who held top leadership posts over one of the four major state or party organs - that is, the head of the Central Committee, National People's Congress, State Council, and CPPCC National Committee.
- Other former members of the Politburo Standing Committee
- Those who held Politburo membership
- Those who held Secretariat membership
- Those who served as Vice-Chairs of the National People's Congress
- Those who served as Vice-Premiers or State Councilors (and not otherwise members of the Politburo)
- Those who served as President of the Supreme People's Court or Supreme People's Procuratorate
- Those who served as vice-chairpersons of the CPPCC National Committee

In general, if leaders are of equal rank on all accounts, those who belong to an earlier cohort are ranked prior to those of later cohorts; leaders are ranked by the last substantive position they held. For example, Li Tieying is ranked among the vice-chairmen of the National People's Congress, and not among the Politburo members, even though he would have qualified for higher ranking among Politburo members - he retired while holding the post NPC vice-chair. Similarly, Hu Qili was a former member of the Politburo Standing Committee, but he was demoted following the Tiananmen Square protests of 1989 and the last position he held prior to retirement was one of the Vice-Chairs of the CPPCC, hence he is ranked among CPPCC Vice-Chairs in protocol sequence.

== Rankings below the National Leadership ==
Within the People's Republic of China, there is a statutory "National Civil Service Rankings System" to determine ranking of officials below the minister-level, stretching from the very important positions (Provincial Party Secretaries, for instance) to the lowest positions (for example, someone who is responsible for a township office). Their relative ranking determines their annual salary, living stipends, entitlement to official residences and vehicles, pensions, benefits, and so forth. Provincial leaders do not enjoy an elevated protocol rank in their own province of jurisdiction. Rather they must still be placed behind all national leaders listed above.

For the purposes of protocol rankings, the heads of national ministries technically hold the same rank as provincial governors. Therefore, they do not qualify as "national leaders". Departmental heads of the CCP, and ministers of the State Council are both called bùzhǎng (部长; literally "Head of Department"). However, many Communist Party Department heads, such as heads of the Organization and Propaganda departments, almost always hold seats on the Politburo, and thus are ranked as "national leaders". Ministers of central government departments rarely hold Politburo seats. (Note: Perhaps a notable exception is Zhou Yongkang, who held a seat on the Politburo as Minister of Public Security between 2002 and 2007.) When all else is equal, the party department heads rank above state department heads; for example, the head of the International Liaison Department of the Chinese Communist Party will always rank ahead of the Minister of Foreign Affairs if they appear in the same function. In a similar vein, the provincial Party Secretary will always rank above the provincial Governor.

The hierarchy of party vs. state positions is strictly adhered to for official protocol, demonstrating the 'vanguard' status of the Communist Party in Chinese politics. Generally, party positions are treated with more prestige than state positions of an equal level, but technically the official civil service privileges are the same for party and state officials of the same administrative level.

=== Local Party Committee rankings ===
A Party Committee is the de facto highest ruling council of any given jurisdiction in the PRC, except for the Special Administrative Regions of Hong Kong and Macau.

In provincial, municipal, and other local-level protocol rankings, the four main institutions generally follow the ranking of:

1. Party Secretary
2. Chief of Government (Governor in Provinces or Mayor in Directly Governed Cities, usually a Deputy Secretary)
3. Chairman of the People's Congress
4. Chairman of the regional People's Political Consultative Conference

Provincial party standing committees are powerful bodies whose membership is vetted directly by the Organization Department of the Chinese Communist Party based on the nomenklatura system. The members of these bodies are generally ranked by date of accession to sub-provincial rank, although in practice there appears to be some variation to this rule.

== See also ==
- Politics of China
- Generations of Chinese leadership
- List of political parties in China#Institutional minor parties. There is an order of precedence among the eight institutional minor parties.
