= 14th National Committee of the Chinese People's Political Consultative Conference =

Meeting of the top political advisory body of the People's Republic of China

14th National Committee of the Chinese People's Political Consultative Conference 中国人民政治协商会议第十四届全国委员会
- Emblem of the Chinese People's Political Consultative Conference

4 March 2023 (3 years, 49 days) – Overview
- Type: Advisory body

Leadership
- Chairman: Wang Huning
- Vice Chairmen: Shi Taifeng, Hu Chunhua, Shen Yueyue, Wang Yong, Zhou Qiang, Pagbalha Geleg Namgyai, Edmund Ho, Leung Chun-ying, Bagatur, Su Hui, Shao Hong, Gao Yunlong, Chen Wu, Mu Hong, Xian Hui, Wang Dongfeng, Jiang Xinzhi, Jiang Zuojun, He Baoxiang, Wang Guangqian, Qin Boyong, Zhu Yongxin, and Yang Zhen
- Secretary-General: Wang Dongfeng
- Standing Committee: 299 members

Members
- Total: 2,172 members

The 14th National Committee of the Chinese People's Political Consultative Conference is the current meeting of the top political advisory body of the People's Republic of China. It convened in Beijing, on 4 March 2023, and is scheduled to continue until March 2028.

== Seat distribution ==
2,169 (originally 2,172) members in the 14th National Committee of CPPCC is composed of:

=== Seats for political parties (544 in total) ===
Major party	General Secretary	Seats
Chinese Communist Party	Xi Jinping	99
Other Parties	Chairperson	Seats
Revolutionary Committee of the Chinese Kuomintang	Zheng Jianbang	65
China Democratic League	Ding Zhongli	65
China National Democratic Construction Association	Hao Mingjin	65
China Association for Promoting Democracy	Cai Dafeng	45
Chinese Peasants' and Workers' Democratic Party	He Wei	45
China Zhi Gong Party	Jiang Zuojun	30
Jiusan Society	Wu Weihua	45
Taiwan Democratic Self-Government League	Su Hui	20
Independents	N/A	65

=== Seats for people's organizations (313 in total) ===
People's organization	Seats
Communist Youth League of China and All-China Youth Federation	36
All-China Federation of Trade Unions	62
All-China Women's Federation	67
All-China Federation of Industry and Commerce	65
China Association for Science and Technology	43
All-China Federation of Taiwan Compatriots	14
All-China Federation of Returned Overseas Chinese	26

=== Seats for Sectoral representatives (1076 in total) ===
Sector	Seats
Literature and Arts	112
Science and Technology	107
Social Science	73
Economics	108
Agriculture	70
Education	103
Sports	24
Press and Publication	49
Medicine and Health	94
Friendship with Foreign Countries	46
Social Welfare and Social Security	35
Environmental Resources	85
Ethnic Minorities	100
Religions	69

=== Specially invited delegates (236 in total) ===
Sector	Seats
Hong Kong	124
Macau	29
Other	83

=== Changes in membership ===
- Disqualification: Hao Hongjun (ACFTU)
- Resignation: Xiang Dong (Ethnic Minority Sector)
- Death: Wu Zunyou (Medical and Health Sector)

== Organization ==
=== Council of Chairpersons ===
		Party	Term
Chairman	Wang Huning	CCP	10 Mar. 2023 – present
Vice Chairpersons	Shi Taifeng	CCP	10 Mar. 2023 – present
Vice Chairpersons	Hu Chunhua	CCP	10 Mar. 2023 – present
Vice Chairpersons	Shen Yueyue	CCP	10 Mar. 2023 – present
Vice Chairpersons	Wang Yong	CCP	10 Mar. 2023 – present
Vice Chairpersons	Zhou Qiang	CCP	10 Mar. 2023 – present
Vice Chairpersons	Pagbalha Geleg Namgyai	Ind.	10 Mar. 2023 – present
Vice Chairpersons	Edmund Ho	Ind.	10 Mar. 2023 – present
Vice Chairpersons	Leung Chun-ying	Ind.	10 Mar. 2023 – present
Vice Chairpersons	Bagatur	CCP	10 Mar. 2023 – present
Vice Chairpersons	Su Hui	TDSL	10 Mar. 2023 – present
Vice Chairpersons	Shao Hong	JS	10 Mar. 2023 – present
Vice Chairpersons	Gao Yunlong	CNDCA	10 Mar. 2023 – present
Vice Chairpersons	Chen Wu	CCP	10 Mar. 2023 – present
Vice Chairpersons	Mu Hong	CCP	10 Mar. 2023 – present
Vice Chairpersons	Xian Hui	CCP	10 Mar. 2023 – present
Vice Chairpersons	Wang Dongfeng	CCP	10 Mar. 2023 – present
Vice Chairpersons	Jiang Xinzhi	CCP	10 Mar. 2023 – present
Vice Chairpersons	Jiang Zuojun	CZGP	10 Mar. 2023 – present
Vice Chairpersons	He Baoxiang	RCCK	10 Mar. 2023 – present
Vice Chairpersons	Wang Guangqian	CDL	10 Mar. 2023 – present
Vice Chairpersons	Qin Boyong	CNDCA	10 Mar. 2023 – present
Vice Chairpersons	Zhu Yongxin	CAPD	10 Mar. 2023 – present
Vice Chairpersons	Yang Zhen	CPWDP	10 Mar. 2023 – present
Secretary-General	Wang Dongfeng	CCP	10 Mar. 2023 – present

=== Special Committees ===
Special committee	Chairperson
Committee for Handling Proposals	Liu Jiayi
Committee for Economic Affairs	Wang Guosheng
Committee for Agriculture and Rural Affairs	Wang Jianjun
Committee of Population, Resources and Environment	Che Jun
Committee of Education, Science, Culture, Health and Sports	Chen Baosheng
Committee for Social and Legal Affairs	Xu Lingyi
Committee for Ethnic and Religious Affairs	Zhang Yijiong
Committee for Liaison with Hong Kong, Macao, Taiwan and Overseas Chinese	Liu Cigui
Committee of Foreign Affairs	He Ping
Committee on Culture, Historical Data and Studies	Wu Yingjie

== The first session ==
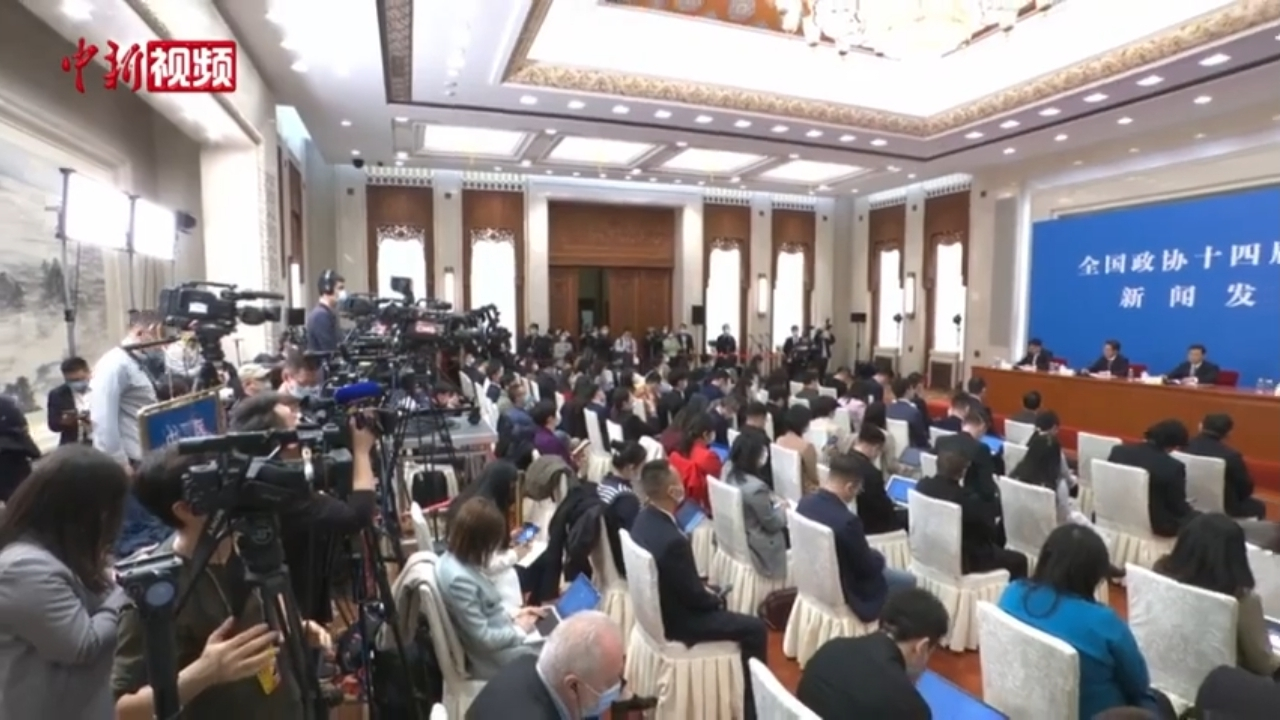
The first press conference of the 1st Session of the 14th CPPCC

The 1st Session of the 14th CPPCC was held from March 4–11, 2023. A preparatory meeting for the session was held on 3 March, presided by Wang Yang, the outgoing CPPCC chairman. The preparatory meeting approved the presidium of the session, the session's agenda and name list of the session's proposals examination committee. The presidium held a meeting later in the day, with Wang Huning presiding over the meeting assisted by several executive chairpersons.

The first plenary meeting of the 1st Session was held on 4 March, where Wang Yang delivered the work report of the Standing Committee of the 13th CPPCC National Committee. On 7 March, the second plenary meeting was held, where various members of the CPPCC gave speeches, including on the proposed amendments to the CPPCC charter.

The third plenary meeting was held on 10 March. During the meeting, Wang Huning was elected as the new chairman of the CPPCC, succeeding Wang Yang. Additionally, the vice chairpersons, the secretary-general and the members of the Standing Committee were elected. On 11 March, the 1st Session held its final meeting, where the work report and amendments to the CPPCC charter were adopted. The session was presided by Wang Huning, who gave the closing address to the meeting.

== The second session ==
The 2nd Session of the 14th CPPCC opened on 4 March 2024. First-ranking CPPCC Vice Chairman Shi Taifeng presided over the opening meeting, while Wang Huning delivered a work report of the Standing Committee of the CPPCC National Committee. The second plenary meeting of the 2nd Session was held on 7 March, presided by CPPCC vice chairwoman Shen Yueyue, where 14 members of the CPPCC National Committee gave their views. The CPPCC held a Standing Committee meeting on 9 March, which approved a series of draft documents ıncluding the work report of the Standing Committee and the draft political resolution. On the same day, the third plenary meeting was held where 14 members of the CPPCC National Committee regarding economic development. On 10 March, the 2nd Session held its final meeting, where the work report was adopted. The session was presided by Wang Huning, who gave the closing address to the meeting.

== The third session ==
The 3rd Session of the 14th CPPCC opened on 4 March 2025. Wang Huning delivered a work report of the Standing Committee of the CPPCC National Committee.

Preceded by 13th CPPCC	National Committee of the Chinese People's Political Consultative Conference; 2023 - 2028	Succeeded by Incumbent
