= Wu Zunyou =

Chinese epidemiologist (1963–2023)

- 吴尊友
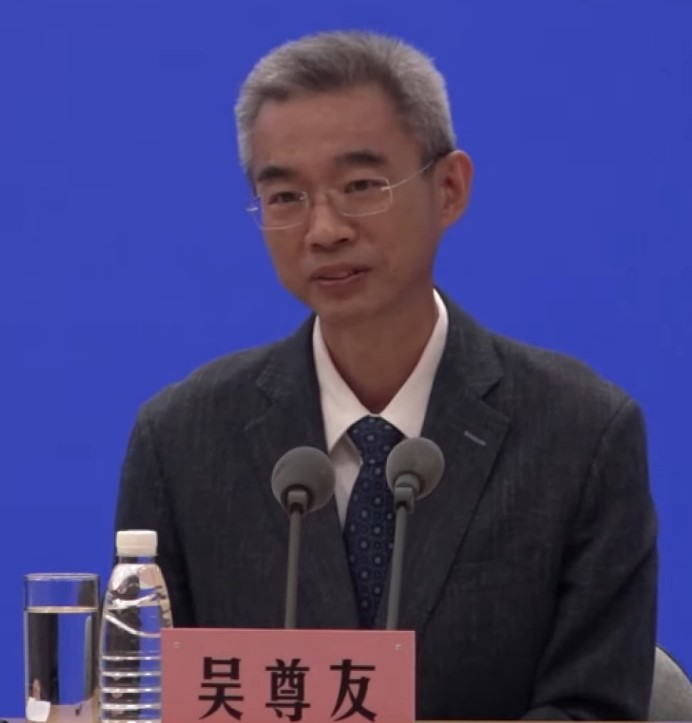
- Wu in 2022
- Born: June 24, 1963; Huangshan city, Anhui, China
- Died: October 27, 2023 (aged 60); Beijing, China
- Education: Anhui Medical University (Epidemiology, Master's degree); University of California, Los Angeles (Epidemiology, Doctor of Philosophy)
- Political party: China Association for Promoting Democracy
- Scientific career
- Fields: Epidemiology
- Workplaces: Chinese Center for Disease Control and Prevention

Wu Zunyou (simplified Chinese: 吴尊友; traditional Chinese: 吳尊友; pinyin: Wú Zūnyǒu; 24 June 1963 – 27 October 2023) was a Chinese epidemiologist. Wu served as the chief epidemiologist at the Chinese Center for Disease Control and Prevention and an adjunct professor of epidemiology at the University of California, Los Angeles until his death from pancreatic cancer on 27 October 2023, at the age of 60.

== Education ==
In 1980, Wu Zunyou passed the college entrance examination and was admitted to the Department of Health of Anhui Medical University. Wu obtained a master's degree in epidemiology from Anhui Medical University in 1988. In the same year, he joined the Anhui Provincial Epidemic Prevention Station. He then obtained a PhD in epidemiology from the University of California, Los Angeles in 1995. From 1995 to 1997, he engaged in postdoctoral research at the Postdoctoral Research Station of the Institute of Virology, Chinese Academy of Preventive Medicine Sciences. His co-supervisor was Zeng Yi.

== Career ==
In 2003, he participated in the prevention and control work of SARS.In 2005, Wu Zunyou served as director of the China Centers for Disease Control and Prevention of STDS and AIDS, engaging in work related to the prevention and treatment of AIDS. In April 2017, he served as chief epidemiologist at the Chinese Center for Disease Control and Prevention.In January 2023, Wu Zunyou was elected as a member of the 14th National Committee of the Chinese People's Political Consultative Conference.

== Death ==
Died of pancreatic cancer at 12:56 on October 27, 2023, at the age of 60; according to his last wish, the funeral was kept simple and no farewell ceremony was held. After Wu Zunyou died, his alma mater, Anhui Medical University, established the Wu Zunyou Scholarship.

== Honor ==
On May 27, 2022, at the 75th World Health Assembly, the World Health Organization awarded the Nelson Mandela Award for Health Promotionto the chief epidemiologist of the Chinese Center for Disease Control and Prevention Professor Wu Zunyou, in recognition of his outstanding achievements in AIDS prevention and control, health promotion and other fields.
