= Yang Xiaodu =

Chinese politician (born 1953)

- 杨晓渡
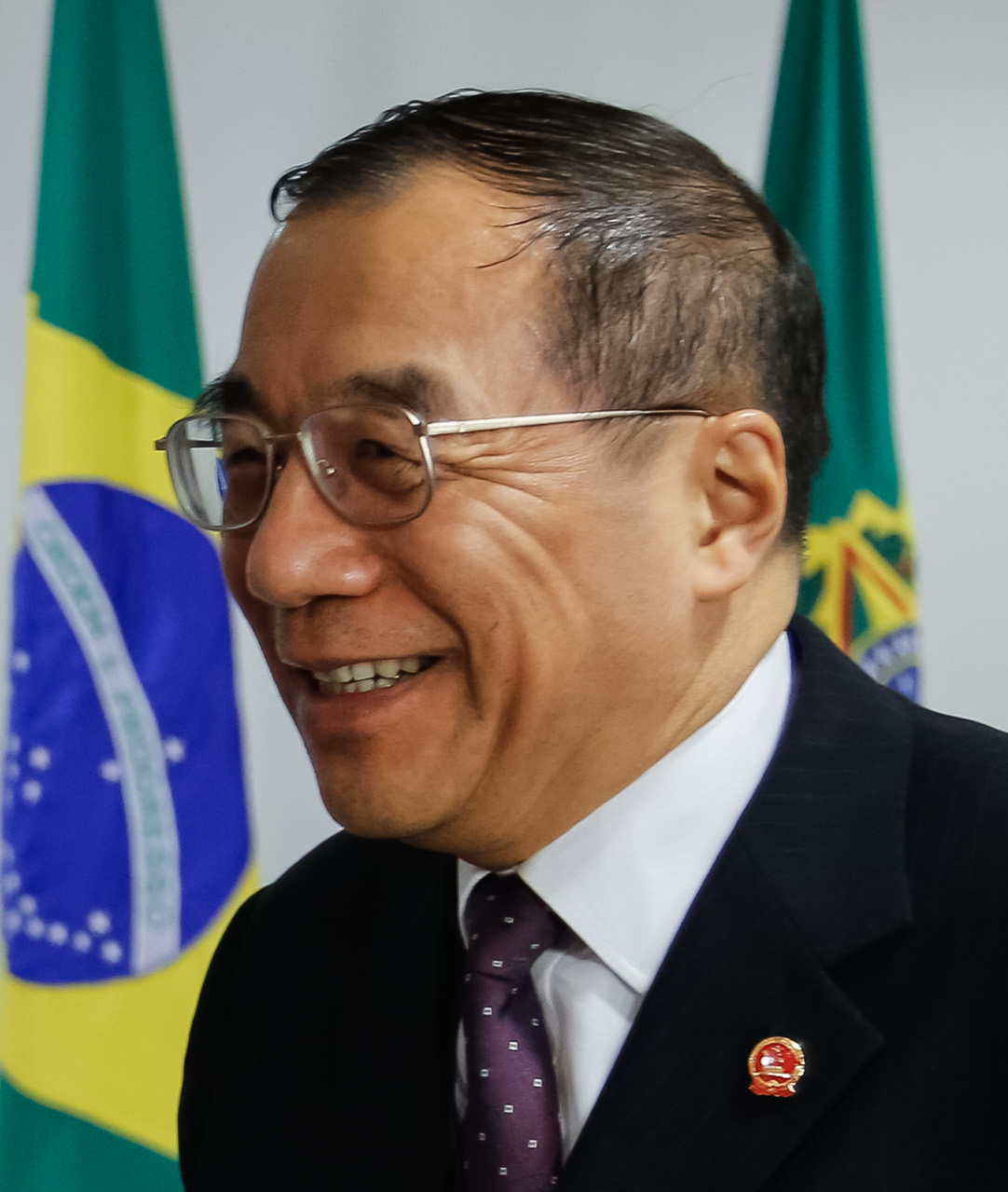

Director of the National Supervisory Commission
- In office 18 March 2018 – 11 March 2023
- Preceded by: Himself (as Minister of Supervision)
- Succeeded by: Liu Jinguo

Deputy Secretary of the Central Commission for Discipline Inspection
- In office 15 January 2014 – 23 October 2022
- Secretary: Zhao Leji (2017–2023); Wang Qishan (2014–2017)

Minister of Supervision
- In office 25 December 2016 – 13 March 2018
- Premier: Li Keqiang
- Preceded by: Huang Shuxian
- Succeeded by: Position abolished

Chairman of the National Bureau of Corruption Prevention
- In office 25 December 2016 – 13 March 2018
- Premier: Li Keqiang
- Preceded by: Huang Shuxian
- Succeeded by: Position abolished

Personal details
- Born: 26 October 1953 (age 72) Shanghai
- Party: Chinese Communist Party

Yang Xiaodu (Chinese: 杨晓渡; pinyin: Yáng Xiǎodù; born 26 October 1953) is a Chinese retired politician who served as the first director of the National Supervisory Commission from 2018 to 2023. He served as a member of the 19th Politburo of the Chinese Communist Party from 2017 to 2022. From 2014 to 2022, he served as a Deputy Secretary of the Central Commission for Discipline Inspection (CCDI), the leading anti-graft body of the Chinese Communist Party. He has served in Shanghai and Tibet during his early political career.

== Early life ==
Yang was born in Shanghai in October 1953. In 1970, during the Cultural Revolution, he was sent-down youth performing manual labour in the Songji Commune, Taihe County, Anhui province, which lasted until 1973. In 1973, he joined the Chinese Communist Party (CCP). In September 1973, he began studying at the Department of Pharmacy at the Shanghai Institute of Traditional Chinese Medicine, graduating in 1976. He afterwards began working as a division head and deputy general manager for a drug company in Nagqu Prefecture, Tibet.

== Political career ==
Between 1984 and 1986, he was named the CCP secretary of Nagqu Hospital. In September 1986, Yang was named deputy commissioner (vice mayor equivalent) of Nagqu. In December 1992, he was named deputy CCP secretary and deputy commissioner of Chamdo Prefecture. In 1995, he was named director of the finance department of the government of the Tibet Autonomous Region. In May 1998, he became vice chairman of Tibet Autonomous Region, ascending to sub-provincial rank for the first time. Starting in 1998, he studied legal theory at the Central Party School with part-time studies, graduating with a master's degree in law in 2001.

In 2001, he returned to his native Shanghai and was appointed as vice mayor. In October 2006, he was named a member of the municipal Party standing committee of Shanghai and head of the municipal United Front Work Department; in May 2012, he was named head of the Shanghai Discipline Inspection Commission.

=== Supervisory career ===
In November 2013, having reached retirement age for sub-provincial level officials, he was named head of the 3rd Inspection Team of the Central Commission for Discipline Inspection (CCDI), in charge of anti-corruption work at the Ministry of Land and Resources. In January 2014, he was elected Deputy Secretary of the CCDI. On December 25, 2016, Yang was named Minister of Supervision, the eighth and oldest person to serve in the position since the founding of the People's Republic, as well as the final one with the abolition of the Ministry in 2018.

After the 19th CCP Congress in 2017, Yang was elected as a member of the 19th Politburo of the Chinese Communist Party and the 19th Central Commission for Discipline Inspection. On 18 March 2018, Yang was elected as the inaugural Director of the National Supervisory Commission (NSC). He was succeeded as NSC director on 11 March 2023 by Liu Jinguo.

=== Post-retirement ===
On 20 September 2023, after the conclusion of the eight national congress of the China Disabled Persons' Federation (CDPF), Yang was elected as the honorary chair of the CDPF, succeeding Deng Pufang.
