= Hao Hongjun =

Chinese politician

- 郝宏军

Chairman of the Dalian Municipal Committee of the Chinese People's Political Consultative Conference
- In office 10 January 2022 – 5 February 2023
- Preceded by: Wang Qiyao
- Succeeded by: TBA

Personal details
- Born: December 1962 (age 63) China
- Party: Chinese Communist Party (1988–2023; expelled)

Chinese name
- Simplified Chinese: 郝宏军
- Traditional Chinese: 郝宏軍
Transcriptions
Standard Mandarin
- Hanyu Pinyin: Hǎo Hóngjūn

Hao Hongjun (Chinese: 郝宏军; born December 1962) is a former Chinese politician. As of February 2023 he was under investigation by China's top anti-corruption agency. Previously he served as chairman of the Dalian Municipal Committee of the Chinese People's Political Consultative Conference.

He is a member of the 14th National Committee of the Chinese People's Political Consultative Conference.

== Career ==
Born in December 1962, Hao joined the Chinese Communist Party (CCP) in April 1988. He once was a technician of Fuxin No. 2 Cable Power Plant. He moved to Fuxin Municipal Committee of the Communist Youth League, and eventually becoming its secretary. He then successively served as deputy party secretary, governor, and party secretary of Qinghemen District, deputy head and head of Fuxin Public Security Bureau, vice mayor of Yingkou and head of Yingkou Public Security Bureau, and secretary of Fushun Municipal Commission for Discipline Inspection.

He was appointed secretary of Dalian Municipal Commission for Discipline Inspection in June 2016 and was admitted to member of the Standing Committee of the CCP Dalian Municipal Committee, the city's top authority. He also served as Dalian Municipal Supervision Commission since January 2018.

He was Liaoning Provincial Commission for Discipline Inspection in December 2019, in addition to serving as deputy director of Liaoning Provincial Supervisory Commission.

In January 2022, he was chosen as chairman of the Dalian Municipal Committee of the Chinese People's Political Consultative Conference.

== Investigation ==
On 5 February 2023, he has been placed under investigation for "serious violations of laws and regulations" by the Central Commission for Discipline Inspection (CCDI), the party's internal disciplinary body, and the National Supervisory Commission, the highest anti-corruption agency of China. On July 27, he was stripped of his posts within the CCP and in the public office. On August 14, he was detained by the Supreme People's Procuratorate. On December 12, he was indicted on suspicion of accepting bribes.

On 22 August 2024, Hao stood trial at the Intermediate People's Court of Handan on charges of taking bribes, prosecutors accused him of taking advantage of his different positions in Liaoning between 2006 and 2023 to seek profits for various companies and individuals in purchase and transfer of bank shares, engineering contracting, commodity sales, case handling, and promotion of positions, in return, he accepted money and property worth over 74.98 million yuan ($10.4 million). On December 26, he was sentenced to life imprisonment for taking bribes, he was deprived of political rights for life and all his properties were also confiscated.

Party political offices
Preceded by Liu Aijun (刘爱军)	Secretary of Dalian Municipal Commission for Discipline Inspection; 2016–2019	Succeeded by ?
Assembly seats
Preceded by Wang Qiyao (王启尧)	Chairman of the Dalian Municipal Committee of the Chinese People's Political Consultative Conference; 2022–2023	Succeeded by TBA
