= Office of the Central Comprehensively Deepening Reforms Commission =

Chinese Communist Party body

- 中央全面深化改革委员会办公室
- Emblem of the Chinese Communist Party

Agency overview
- Formed: November 2013
- Type: Administrative agency of the Central Comprehensively Deepening Reforms Commission
- Jurisdiction: Chinese Communist Party
- Headquarters: Zhongnanhai, Beijing
- Agency executives: Wang Huning, Director; Mu Hong, Executive Deputy Director
- Parent agency: Central Comprehensively Deepening Reforms Commission

Office of the Central Comprehensively Deepening Reforms Commission
- Simplified Chinese: 中央全面深化改革委员会办公室
- Traditional Chinese: 中央全面深化改革委員會辦公室
Transcriptions
Standard Mandarin
- Hanyu Pinyin: Zhōngyāng Quánmiàn Shēnhuà Gǎigé Wěiyuánhuì Bàngōngshì

Abbreviation
- Simplified Chinese: 中央改革办
- Traditional Chinese: 中央改革辦
Transcriptions
Standard Mandarin
- Hanyu Pinyin: Zhōngyāng Gǎigébàn

The Office of the Central Comprehensively Deepening Reforms Commission is the administrative agency of the Central Comprehensively Deepening Reforms Commission (CCDRC), a policy formulation and implementation body of the Central Committee of the Chinese Communist Party (CCP). It is the permanent body of the CCDRC, and handles its day-to-day administrative operations. The Office also serves as an external name of the Central Policy Research Office.

== History ==
On 30 December 2013, the Central Leading Group for Comprehensively Deepening Reform was established. Its office was located in the Central Policy Research Office (CPRO), and Wang Huning, the director of the CPRO, concurrently served as the director of the office. The Plan for Deepening the Reform of the Party and State Institutions issued by the CCP Central Committee in March 2018 stated that the Central Leading Group for Comprehensively Deepening Reform would be changed into the Central Comprehensively Deepening Reforms Commission.

== Organizational structure ==
In accordance with relevant regulations, the Office of the Central Commission for Comprehensively Deepening Reforms has the following structure:

=== Internal Organization ===
- Secretariat
- Coordination Bureau
- Inspection Bureau
- Economic Bureau (Economic Bureau of the Central Policy Research Office)
- Rural Affairs Bureau (Rural Affairs Bureau of the Central Policy Research Office)
- Cultural Affairs Bureau (Cultural Research Bureau of the Central Policy Research Office)
- Party Building Bureau (Party Building Bureau of the Central Policy Research Office)

== Leaders ==
Director of the Office of the Central Committee for Comprehensively Deepening Reform
Name	Term of office	Other positions held	Ref.
Wang Huning	January 2014—	Served as a member of the CCP Politburo from October 2017, a member of the CCP Politburo Standing Committee since October 2017, and as the chairman of the Chinese People's Political Consultative Conference from March 2023.	

Executive Deputy Director of the Office of the Central Commission for Comprehensively Deepening Reform (deputy director in charge of daily work)
Name	Term of office	Other positions held	Ref.
Mu Hong	December 2014—	Deputy Director of the National Development and Reform Commission, Ministerial Level; Served as a Vice Chairman of the Chinese People's Political Consultative Conference since March 2023, Vice State Level	

Deputy Director of the Office of the Central Commission for Comprehensively Deepening Reform
Name	Term of office	Other positions held	Ref.
Mu Hong	January - December 2014	Full-time Deputy Director, deputy director of the National Development and Reform Commission	
Pan Shengzhou	January 2014 - June 2017	Deputy Director of the Central Policy Research Office	
Chen Yixin	December 2015 - January 2017	Full-time Deputy Director	
