= Liu Jinguo =

Chinese politician and public security official (born 1955)

- 刘金国

Director of the National Supervisory Commission
- Incumbent
- Assumed office 11 March 2023
- Preceded by: Yang Xiaodu

Deputy Director of the National Supervisory Commission
- In office March 2018 – 11 March 2023
- Director: Yang Xiaodu

Deputy Secretary of the Central Commission for Discipline Inspection
- Incumbent
- Assumed office 25 October 2014
- Secretary: Wang Qishan; Zhao Leji; Li Xi

Head of the Office Dealing with Heretical Religions
- In office February 2014 – December 2014
- Preceded by: Li Dongsheng
- Succeeded by: Fu Zhenghua

Secretary of the Commission for Discipline Inspection at the Ministry of Public Security
- In office August 2009 – March 2015
- Preceded by: Zhu Chunlin
- Succeeded by: Deng Weiping

Personal details
- Born: April 1955 (age 71) Changli County, Hebei, China
- Party: Chinese Communist Party
- Education: Central Party School of the Chinese Communist Party

Chinese name
- Simplified Chinese: 刘金国
- Traditional Chinese: 劉金國
Transcriptions
Standard Mandarin
- Hanyu Pinyin: Liú Jīnguó

Liu Jinguo (Chinese: 刘金国; born April 1955) is a Chinese politician and public security official who is the current director of the National Supervisory Commission and a secretary of the Secretariat of the Chinese Communist Party. Since 2014 he has served as Deputy Secretary of the Central Commission for Discipline Inspection. Previously he held various senior posts at the Ministry of Public Security.

== Biography ==
Liu was born in Changli County, Hebei Province in April 1955, to an ordinary family of farmers. He was the second of six children. After graduating high school, he returned to his hometown to farm. Liu joined the Chinese Communist Party in 1975 and he became involved in politics in December 1976, when he became village party chief. In September 1983, he was admitted to the provincial party school on recommendation. Thereafter he progressively made his way up the ranks. He became deputy party chief and district governor of Shanhaiguan, then secretary-general of the Qinhuangdao Party Committee.

In May 1992, Liu served as Director of Qinhuangdao Public Security Bureau, he was a member of the Standing Committee in Qinhuangdao Municipal Standing Committee and served as the Vice Mayor of Qinhuangdao in November 1994. In 1995, Liu was transferred to the Deputy Head of Hebei Public Security Department. In January 2002, he was promoted to become the Secretary of the Hebei Provincial Politics and Law Commission, a position he held until 2005. From March 2005 to January 2014, Liu was elevated to the Deputy Minister of Public Security. Due to his achievements during the Xingang Port oil spill, Liu was given honours by the State Council and was featured on state television as "one of the people who touched China in 2011."

Liu obtained a graduate degree from the Central Party School, where he majored in economic administration.

After Li Dongsheng was sacked due to corruption, Liu took on many of Li's portfolios, including his post as head of the office dealing with cults (better known as the 610 Office). He was thus elevated to minister-level.

He left his post as the head of discipline at the Ministry of Public Security in March 2015, and his post at the cult office on May 26, 2015. It is not clear who succeeded him at the cult office.

== Award ==
- 3 February 2012, "Moving China"

Party political offices
Preceded by Feng Wenhai	Secretary of Political Law Committee of Hebei Provincial Committee of the Chinese Communist Party; 2002–2005	Succeeded by Che Jun
Preceded by Zhu Chunlin	Secretary of the Discipline Inspection Committee of the Ministry of Public Security of the Chinese Communist Party; 2009–2015	Succeeded by Deng Weiping
Preceded by Li Dongsheng	Head of the Office Dealing with Heretical Religions; 2014–2015	Succeeded by Fu Zhenghua
Government offices
Preceded by Zhu Chunlin	Inspector General of the Ministry of Public Security of the People's Republic of China; 2009–2015	Succeeded by Deng Weiping
