= Director of the National Supervisory Commission =

Chinese government position

Director of the National Supervisory Commission of the People's Republic of China
- 中华人民共和国国家监察委员会主任
- National Emblem of China

- Flag of China
- Incumbent; Liu Jinguo since 11 March 2023
- National Supervisory Commission
- Status: Deputy national-level official
- Member of: National Supervisory Commission
- Reports to: National People's Congress and its Standing Committee
- Seat: Beijing
- Nominator: Presidium of the National People's Congress
- Appointer: National People's Congress
- Term length: Five years, renewable once consecutively
- Constituting instrument: Constitution of China
- Formation: 11 March 2018; 8 years ago
- First holder: Yang Xiaodu
- Deputy: Deputy Director

Director of the National Supervisory Commission
- Simplified Chinese: 中华人民共和国国家监察委员会主任
- Traditional Chinese: 中華人民共和國國家監察委員會主任
Transcriptions
Standard Mandarin
- Hanyu Pinyin: Zhōnghuá Rénmín Gònghéguó Guójiā Jiānchá Wěiyuánhuì Zhǔrèn

Alternative Chinese name
- Simplified Chinese: 国家监察委员会主任
- Traditional Chinese: 國家監察委員會主任
Transcriptions
Standard Mandarin
- Hanyu Pinyin: Guójiā Jiānchá Wěiyuánhuì Zhǔrèn

The director of the National Supervisory Commission is the head of the National Supervisory Commission, the highest state supervisory agency of China.

Under the current constitution, the director is appointed by and serves at the pleasure of the National People's Congress (NPC), the legislature. The incumbent procurator-general is Liu Jinguo, who took office on 11 March 2023.

== History ==
The National Supervisory Commission was established in March 2018. Yang Xiaodu served as the first director.

== Selection ==
According to the Organic Law of the National People's Congress (NPC), constitutionally China's supreme organ of state power, the director is nominated by the NPC Presidium, the Congress's executive organ. However, the nomination is effectively made by the Chinese Communist Party, with the decisions being made among Party leaders. Candidates for top positions including the director are first approved first by the CCP's Politburo Standing Committee, and then by its Politburo, then approved in a special plenary session the Central Committee just before the NPC session for election by the Congress, with the Presidium presenting the nominee during the NPC session. Although the Presidium could theoretically nominate multiple candidates for the presidency, leading the election to be competitive, it has always nominated a single candidate for the office.

After the nomination, the director is elected by the NPC, which also has the power to remove him and other state officers from their office. Elections and removals are decided by majority vote only in a NPC plenary session. The length of the director's term of office is the same as the NPC, which is five years, and the prosecutor general is restricted to two consecutive terms of office. The director is required to recite the constitutional oath of office before assuming office.

== List of directors ==
No.	Chairperson	NPC term	Took office	Left office	Political Party	Ref.
1	Yang Xiaodu 杨晓渡	13th	March 18, 2018	March 11, 2023	Chinese Communist Party (CCP)	
2	Liu Jinguo 刘金国	14th	March 11, 2023	Incumbent	Chinese Communist Party (CCP)	
