= Mu Hong =

Chinese economist and politician

- 穆虹

Vice Chairman of the Chinese People's Political Consultative Conference
- Incumbent
- Assumed office 10 March 2023
- Chairman: Wang Huning

Deputy Director of the Office of the Central Comprehensively Deepening Reforms Commission (Note: Office was known as the "Deputy Director of the Office of the Central Leading Group for Comprehensively Deepening Reforms" before March 2018.)
- Incumbent
- Assumed office January 2014
- Director: Wang Huning

Deputy Director of the National Development and Reform Commission
- In office December 2007 – March 2023

Personal details
- Born: December 1956 (age 69) Dalian, Liaoning
- Party: Chinese Communist Party
- Education: Central University of Finance and Economics

Mu Hong (Chinese: 穆虹; pinyin: Mù Hóng; born December 1956) is a Chinese economist and official, who is currently a vice chairman of the Chinese People's Political Consultative Conference. He has also been serving since 2014 as the executive deputy director of the Office of Deepening Reform (minister-level), and since 2007 as a deputy director of the National Development and Reform Commission.

== Biography ==
Chen was born in Dalian, Liaoning province. He graduated with a degree in finance from Central University of Finance and Economics. He began his administrative career in the National Planning Commission, then was elevated to a department chief position in the National Development and Reform Commission (NDRC). He later served as the assistant to the Chairman, then Vice Chairman (governor) of the Guangxi Zhuang Autonomous Region, while concurrently serving as the head of the autonomous region's Development and Reform Commission. In December 2007, he was named deputy director of the NDRC.

He served as a member of the 14th National Committee of the Chinese People's Political Consultative Conference on 17 January 2023 from the CCP constituency. He was also appointed a CPPCC vice chairman on 10 March 2023.

On May 3, at the behest of the Gabonese Republic, Mu Hong, serving as the special envoy of President Xi Jinping, participated in the inauguration ceremony of President Brice Oligui Nguema in Libreville, the capital of Gabon.
