= Yang Zhen (politician) =

Chinese politician

- 杨震

Vice Chairman of the Chinese People's Political Consultative Conference
- Incumbent
- Assumed office 10 March 2023
- Chairman: Wang Huning

Personal details
- Born: November 1961 (age 64) Changzhou, Jiangsu
- Party: Chinese Peasants' and Workers' Democratic Party
- Education: Shanghai Jiao Tong University

Yang Zhen (Chinese: 杨震, born November 1961) is a Chinese politician and the former president of Nanjing University of Posts and Telecommunications (NUPT) beginning in June 2006. On March 10, 2023, Yang was named a vice chairperson of the Chinese People's Political Consultative Conference.

== Biography ==
Yang received undergraduate and master's degrees from NUPT, and holds a doctorate in communications and information systems from Shanghai Jiao Tong University. From 2001 to 2006, he was the vice president of NUPT, and from 2000 to 2001, he was the deputy director of the school's information engineering department. Yang was previously a delegate to the 10th, 11th, 12th, and 13th National People's Congresses. Yang was named a standing vice chairman of the central committee of the Chinese Peasants' and Workers' Democratic Party in December 2022. On March 10, 2023, Yang was named a vice chairperson of the Chinese People's Political Consultative Conference.
