= Jiang Zuojun =

Chinese politician

- 蒋作君
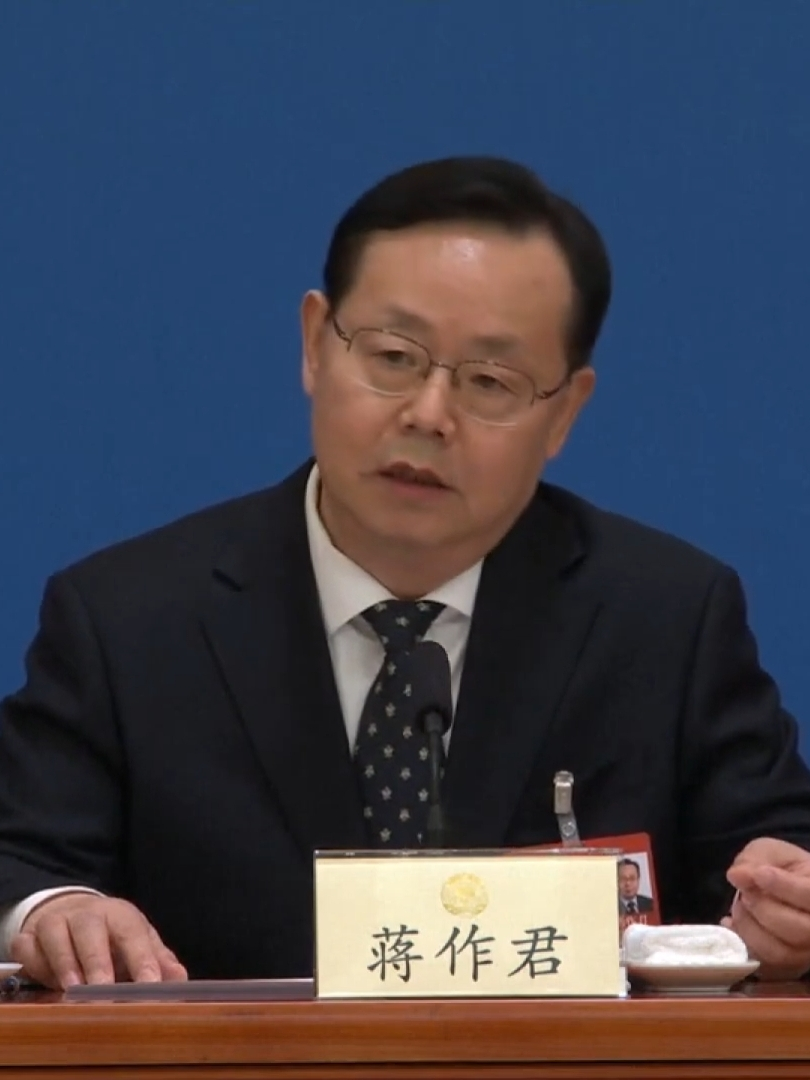
- Jiang in 2023

Vice Chairman of the Chinese People's Political Consultative Conference
- Incumbent
- Assumed office 10 March 2023
- Chairman: Wang Huning

Chairman of the Central Committee of the China Zhi Gong Party
- Incumbent
- Assumed office 14 December 2022
- Preceded by: Wan Gang

Deputy to the National People's Congress of the People's Republic of China
- In office 1997–2003

Personal details
- Born: January 1955 (age 71) Anhui Province, Huaining, China
- Party: China Zhi Gong Party
- Education: Nanjing Institute of Medicine
- Profession: Professor of medicine

Jiang Zuojun (Chinese: 蒋作君, born 1955) is a Chinese politician who has served as a vice chairperson of the National Committee of the Chinese People's Political Consultative Conference since 2023, and as chairman of the Central Committee of the China Zhi Gong Party.

== Biography ==
Jiang joined the China Zhi Gong Party in October 1993, and has served as a member of its National Standing Committee and chairman of its Anhui Provincial Committee from 1998 until 2004. From 2004 to 2007, Jiang served as vice minister of health of the People's Republic of China. Jiang has also served as a deputy to the ninth and tenth National People's Congress of the People's Republic of China, a member of the Standing Committee of the eleventh, twelfth, and thirteenth National Committee of the Chinese People's Political Consultative Conference, and a deputy secretary-general of the tenth, eleventh, twelfth, and thirteenth National Committee of the Chinese People's Political Consultative Conference.

In December 2022, Jiang was elected chairman of Central Committee of the China Zhi Gong Party during the first plenary session of the Central Committee of the China Zhi Gong Party.
