= Jiang Xinzhi =

Chinese politician (born 1958)

- 姜信治
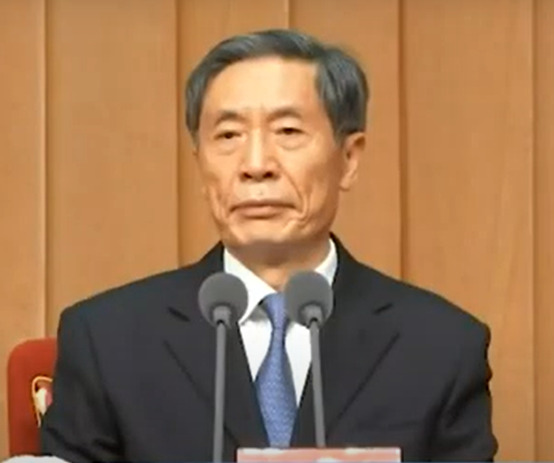
- Jiang Xinzhi attends a meeting of leading cadres of the Xinjiang Uygur Autonomous Region on December 25, 2021, in his capacity as vice minister in charge of daily work at the Central Organization Department.

Vice Chairman of the Chinese People's Political Consultative Conference
- Incumbent
- Assumed office 10 March 2023
- Chairman: Wang Huning

Executive Deputy Head of the Organization Department of the Chinese Communist Party
- Incumbent
- Assumed office November 2017
- Head: Chen Xi; Li Ganjie; Shi Taifeng
- Preceded by: Chen Xi

Personal details
- Born: February 1958 (age 68) Dunhuang, Gansu, People's Republic of China
- Party: Chinese Communist Party
- Education: Lanzhou University

Jiang Xinzhi (Chinese: 姜信治; born February 1958) is a Chinese politician, serving as a senior official within the Chinese Communist Party. Since November 2017, he has been serving as the executive Deputy Head of the party's Organization Department, under Chen Xi.

== Biography ==
Jiang was born in 1958, in Dunhuang, Gansu, and graduated from Lanzhou University with a degree in political economics. In the early 1980s, Jiang would serve as a finance and trade school teacher. Beginning in 1983, he would work for the Gansu provincial Party Committee Organization Department.

In 1990, Jiang was appointed Deputy Secretary of the Anning District in Lanzhou. By 1994, he was appointed deputy director of the Gansu provincial Organization Department, and by 1995, was appointed Director. In 2003, he would be moved to the Linxia Hui Autonomous Prefecture, and would serve as Chairman of its National People's Congress Standing Committee. In 2007, he was appointed CCP Committee Secretary of the Linxia Hui Autonomous Prefecture, a post he would hold until 2011.

In 2011, he was transferred to Fujian, where he would serve in its provincial organization department until 2015. In November 2015, he was made a deputy head of the Central Party Organization Department, and by November 2017, was its Executive Deputy Head, with full ministerial rank.

Jiang is a member of the 19th Central Commission for Discipline Inspection.
