= Shen Yueyue =

Chinese politician

- 沈跃跃

Vice Chairwoman of the Chinese People's Political Consultative Conference
- Incumbent
- Assumed office 10 March 2023
- Chairman: Wang Huning

President of the All-China Women's Federation
- In office 7 May 2013 – 25 October 2023
- Party Secretary: Song Xiuyan; Huang Xiaowei
- Preceded by: Chen Zhili
- Succeeded by: Shen Yiqin

Vice Chairwoman of the Standing Committee of the National People's Congress
- In office 14 March 2013 – 10 March 2023
- Chairman: Zhang Dejiang; Li Zhanshu

Executive Deputy Head of the Organization Department of the Chinese Communist Party
- In office July 2007 – 19 November 2012
- Head: He Guoqiang; Li Yuanchao
- Preceded by: Zhao Hongzhu
- Succeeded by: Chen Xi

Personal details
- Born: January 1957 (age 69) Ningbo, Zhejiang
- Party: Chinese Communist Party (1981–present)
- Education: Ningbo Normal College; Central Party School of the Chinese Communist Party

Shen Yueyue (simplified Chinese: 沈跃跃; traditional Chinese: 沈躍躍; pinyin: Shěn Yuèyuè; born January 1957) is a Chinese politician, former regional official, and is currently a Vice Chairwoman of the Chinese People's Political Consultative Conference. She was a Vice Chairwoman of the National People's Congress Standing Committee and President of the All-China Women's Federation from 2013 to 2023. In her early career she served in Zhejiang province, before going to Anhui province and later the Organization Department of the Chinese Communist Party.

== Biography ==
Born in Ningbo, Zhejiang Province, Shen started working in April 1977 as a clerk at a local food store. From June 1978 to July 1980, she studied at Ningbo Normal College, majoring in mathematics. She joined the Chinese Communist Party in September 1981. After that, she became a teacher at Ningbo 7th High School, and deputy secretary of Communist Youth League committee of the school. In August 1983, Shen was elevated to vice secretary of CYL Ningbo committee and became the secretary a year later. In November 1986, Shen became the vice secretary of CYL Zhejiang committee, and was promoted to secretary in November 1991.

In March 1993, she was appointed Deputy Party Secretary Hangzhou, the provincial capital. In February 1997, she became the secretary of CCP Shaoxing committee. In December 1998, Shen was elevated to the Zhejiang Provincial Party Standing Committee (sub-provincial rank), and vice director of organization department of Zhejiang. She became the director of organization department in January 1999. From June 2001 to November 2002, Shen served as vice secretary of CCP Anhui committee. From November 2002, she has served as vice director of Central Organization Department of CCP. She was also the vice Minister of Personnel from April 2003 till the abolishment of the Ministry in 2007. Between July 2007 and April 2013, Shen served as the Executive Deputy Head of the Organization Department of Chinese Communist Party. In March 2013, she was named vice-chairman of the National People's Congress, joining the ranks of "party and state leaders". In May 2013 she became the President of the All-China Women's Federation.

On 7 December 2020, pursuant to Executive Order 13936, the US Department of the Treasury imposed sanctions on all 14 Vice Chairperson of the National People's Congress, including Shen, for "undermining Hong Kong's autonomy and restricting the freedom of expression or assembly."

In March 2023, Shen became a Vice Chairwoman of the Chinese People's Political Consultative Conference.

Shen was an alternate of 15th and 16th Central Committees of the Chinese Communist Party, and was a full member of 17th, 18th, 19th, and 20th Central Committees.

Party political offices
Preceded by Zhao Hongzhu	Executive Deputy Head of the Organization Department of the Chinese Communist Party; 2007–2013	Succeeded by Chen Xi
Civic offices
Preceded by Chen Zhili	President of the All-China Women's Federation; 2013–2023	Succeeded by Shen Yiqin
