= He Baoxiang =

Chinese politician

- 何报翔
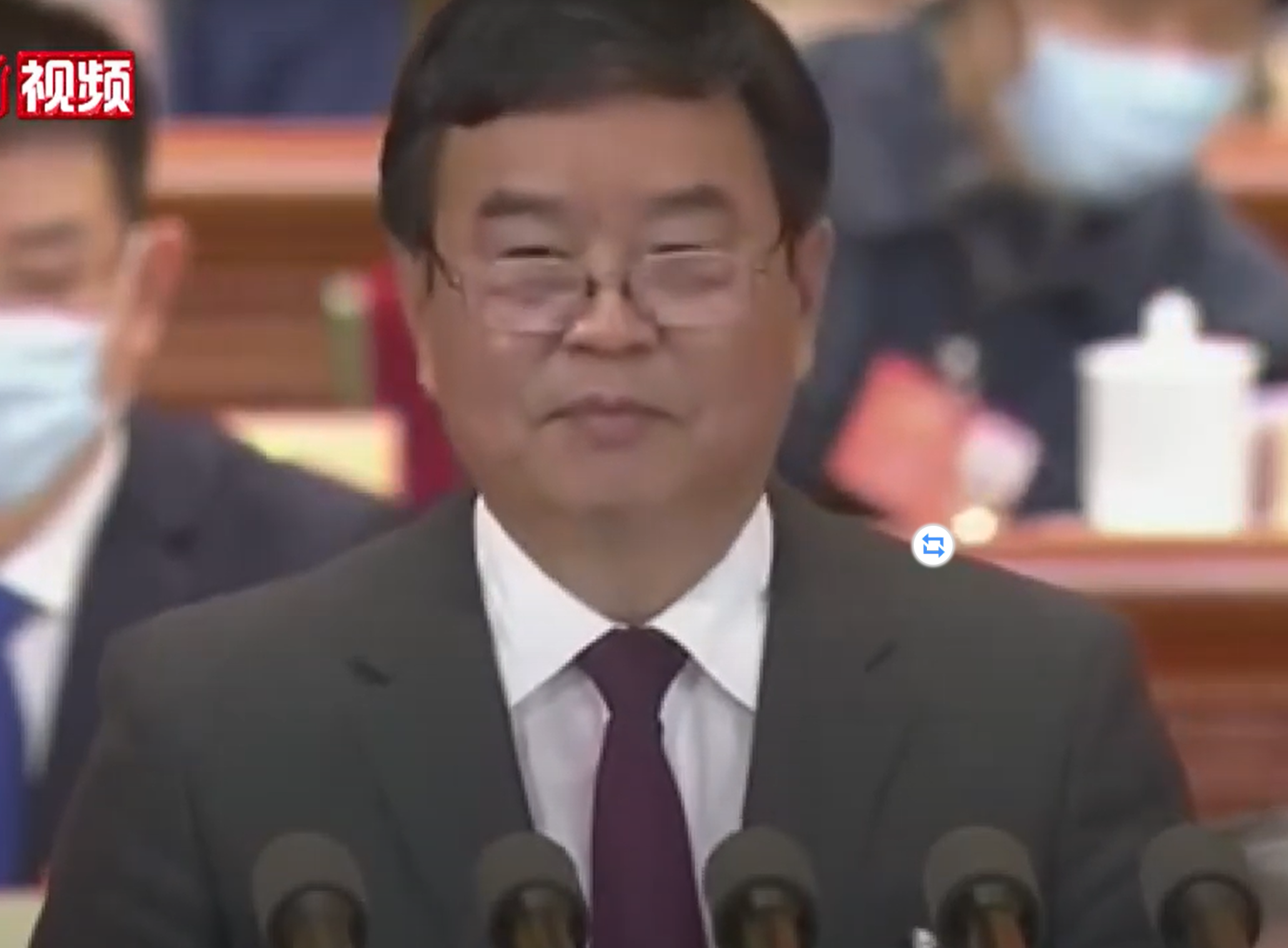
- He in 2020

Vice Chairman of the Chinese People's Political Consultative Conference
- Incumbent
- Assumed office 10 March 2023
- Chairman: Wang Huning

Vice Governor of Hunan
- In office September 2011 – November 2022

Personal details
- Born: January 1963 (age 63) Yueyang City, Hunan Province
- Party: Revolutionary Committee of the Chinese Kuomintang
- Education: Beijing Chemical Engineering Institute

He Baoxiang (Chinese: 何报翔, born 1963) is a Chinese politician, who has served as a vice chairperson of the Chinese People's Political Consultative Conference since 2023, and as Vice Governor of Hunan Province from 2011 to 2022.

== Biography ==
He graduated from Beijing Chemical Engineering Institute in 1982 with a bachelor's degree, after beginning his studies there in 1978. From 1986 until 1997, he was a Deputy Magistrate at the County People's Court in Yueyang County. From 2008 until 2011, he served as the Vice Chairman of the Chinese People's Political Consultative Conference Hunan Provincial Committee.

From 2011 to 2022, he served as the Vice Governor of Hunan Province. Since 2023, he has served as a vice chairperson of the Chinese People's Political Consultative Conference.
