= Zhu Yongxin =

Chinese politician

Zhu Yongxin 朱永新
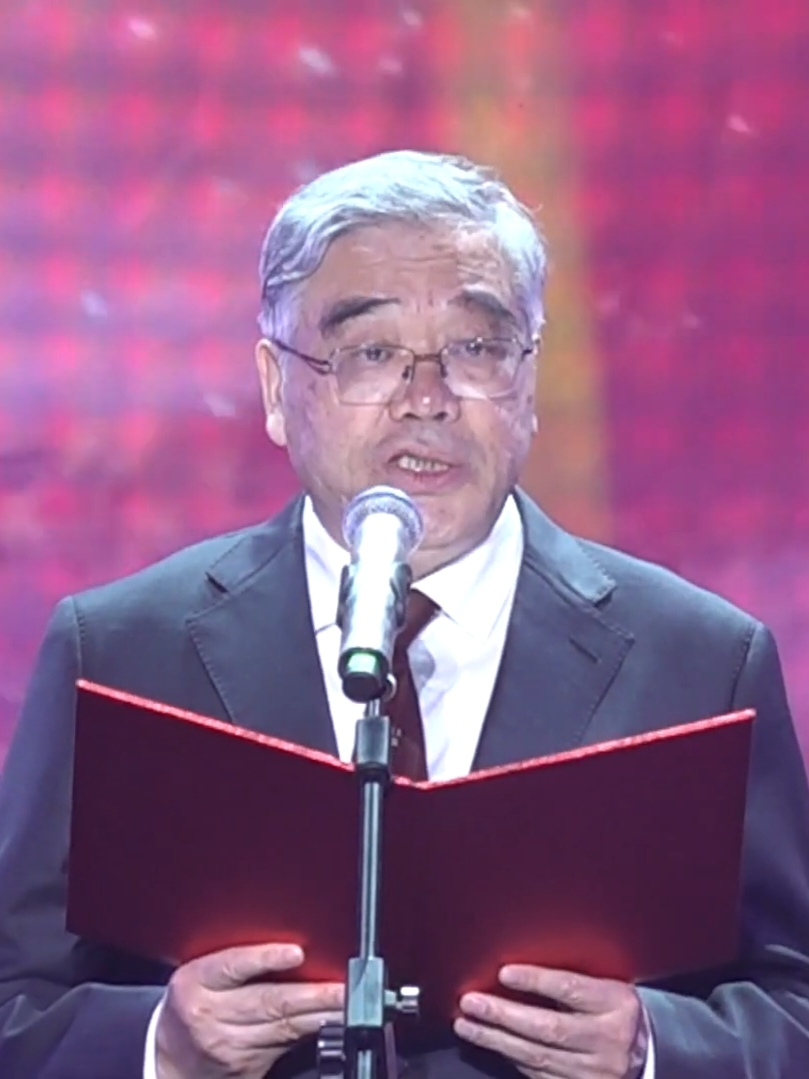
- Zhu in 2025
- Born: August 1958 (age 68); Dafeng, Jiangsu Province
- Education: Fudan University, Tongji University, Soochow University
- Occupation: Educator
- Awards: Yidan Prize for Education Research

Zhu Yongxin (Chinese: 朱永新; born August 1958) is the deputy secretary general of 12th of Chinese People's Political Consultative Conference, the vice chairman of China Association for Promoting Democracy, vice president of Chinese Society of Education (CSE). He also works as a professor and PhD supervisor in Soochow University. He was born in Dafeng, Jiangsu Province, People's Republic of China.

== Biography ==
Zhu Yongxin was born August 1958 in Dafeng County, Jiangsu. His father is a local teacher in Dafeng. Zhu entered Soochow University in 1977, majoring in educational psychology, as the first enrollment through Gaokao after the Cultural Revolution. After two years, he was sent to study at Shanghai Normal University to meet the shortfall of teachers at Soochow University.

Since returning to Suzhou in 1982, Zhu had been teaching and doing research at Soochow University and became an associate Professor in 1987. He has also taken the position dean of Academic Affairs Office at Soochow University by 1997. After that, Zhu entered the government, becoming vice mayor of Suzhou and is responsible for education, science, culture, and health field. Until 2007, he was selected to the vice chairman of China Association for Promoting Democracy.

== Academic ==
Professor Zhu Yongxin researches on education of China, over the past 20 years, he has published more than 400 papers on education and over 30 works domestically and abroad. He is also the editor of "Contemporary Japanese Education Series", "Education in the new century library", "New education" and others. Furthermore, he has undertaken UNESCO commissioned research projects, National Natural Science Fund, the National Social Science fund. As a professor and PhD advisor in Suzhou University, Zhu is the initiator of the program New Education Experiment. He proposed the ideal of education in 2002, in that program, he draws a blueprint for a quality education system in contemporary China. By 2013, there are more than 1500 experimental school participated in New Education Experiment among 25 provinces, and over 1500 thousand teachers and students have taken part in this program. Professor Zhu has published more than 400 articles on education both at home and abroad, and published over 30 books as well.

== Awards and recognition ==
Zhu was appointed one of "60 Outstanding People in Chinese Education in the Past 60 Years (2009)", "Man of the Day in Chinese Education (2008)" on the 30th anniversary of reform and opening-up, "Top Ten Men in the News since China's Reform (2007)", and "China's Ten Distinguished Educators (2006)".

Zhu was awarded the 2022 Yidan Prize for Education Research. The prize consists of a gold medal, a cash award of HK$15 million and a project fund of HK$15 million.

== Works ==
- 1.History of Chinese Ancient Educational Thoughts (Chinese: 中国古代教育思想史), "discusses the changes, developments, and far-reaching impacts on future generations of education in China, and objectively presents a complete portrait of the history of Chinese ancient educational thought."
- 2.History of Chinese Modern Educational Thought (Chinese: 中国近现代思想史), "an authoritative look at recent developments in China’s approach to educating its young—and what it means for the rest of the world."
- 3.History of Chinese Contemporary Educational Thoughts (Chinese: 中国当代教育思想史), "Chinese education has witnessed radical changes and remarkable achievements over the past forty years. While there have been many advancements, there also have been many mistakes, leading to a growing crisis in education that needs to be fixed. Only by raising awareness of the problems and defects in the system can China build upon its past successes and create future opportunities for educational excellence."
- 4.The Research of Native Chinese Psychology (Chinese: 中国本土心理学研究), "A detailed study of how modern psychology and ancient philosophy impacts education."
- 5.My Vision on Education (Chinese: 我的教育理想), "One of China's leading education experts explores the best ways to create ideal schools, teachers, administrators, and education."
- 6.My View on Reading (Chinese: 我的阅读观), "One of China’s top education scholars, Zhu Yongxin provides never-before-tried methods for promoting literacy throughout China."
- 7.New Education Experiment in China (Chinese: 中国新教育), "The founder of the New-Style Education Experiment of China provides Western readers with a rare inside look at the Chinese education system."
- 8.Lectures on the New Education (Chinese: 新教育讲演录), "Based on the enlightening lectures of China’s forward-thinking educator Zhu Yongxin, this landmark collection tracks the ongoing evolution of the new educational ideals that are transforming our schools, our communities, and our future."
- 9.Dialogues on the New Education (Chinese: 新教育对话录), "This is a collection of interviews with Professor Zhu on a wide array of important education issues."
- 10.On the Way to the New Education (Chinese: 走在新教育路上), "In this brilliantly observed collection of essays, Yongxin takes readers on a fascinating journey through time, mapping out the rapid growth and incredible success of New Education in China―year by year, teacher by teacher, student by student."
- 11.Analects of the New Education of China (Chinese: 写在新教育边上), "In this brilliantly observed collection of essays, Yongxin takes readers on a fascinating journey through time, mapping out the rapid growth and incredible success of New Education in China―year by year, teacher by teacher, student by studentFilled with powerful insights and inspiring true stories, this book is the culmination of Zhu Yongxin’s lifetime of experience as a student, teacher, lecturer, and pioneering leader of education experiment. These essays provide a window to the daily lives of the dedicated men and women who are turning the dream of a new education in China into a thrilling and beautiful reality."
- 12.Observation on the Education of China (Chinese: 中国教育观察), "China’s top education thought leader provides a thorough examination of the state of China’s education system―what’s working, what’s not, and what’s to be done."
- 13.Observation on the Education of Foreign Countries (Chinese: 外国教育观察观), "In this enlightening collection of essays, he shares his observations and reflections on the educational advances in countries throughout the world. Exploring both classic traditions and modern reforms, here and abroad, Yongxin provides a rich tapestry of ideas and initiatives which can help us move forward in the new education of China."
- 14.Analects of Educational Psychology (Chinese: 教育心理学论稿), "In these illuminating essays, he applies his psychological background, educational experience, and profound personal insight to the important subjects of school counseling, mental health, and the psychology of learning. These deeply observed essays are essential reading for administrators, teachers, and students of psychology."
- 15.Discourses on the Education of China (Chinese: 中国教育评论), "In this book, I try my best to contribute my observations and reflections on Chinese educational issues, to raise awareness and inspire confidence and hope." Professor Zhu says.
- 16.Advice on the Education of China (Chinese: 中国教育建议), "The most comprehensive work on China’s education reform available--from one of the nation’s most influential figures in education."
- 17.Words of Zhu Yongxin on education (Chinese: 朱永新教育小语),
