= Shao Hong =

Chinese male politician

Shao Hong (Chinese: 邵鸿, born November 1957) is a Chinese politician who is currently a vice chairperson of the National Committee of the Chinese People's Political Consultative Conference. Shao is also a vice chairperson of the central committee of the Jiusan Society, one of China's minor political parties.

Shao is from Gaizhou, Liaoning Province. In 1975, he went to Jiangxi Province as a sent-down youth, and remained there until 1978. He received an undergraduate degree in history from Jiangxi Normal University in 1982, a graduate degree in political economics from Sun Yat-sen University in 1985, and a doctorate in ancient Chinese history from Nankai University in 1991. From 1999 to 2005, he was the vice president of Nanchang University.
