= Xi Jinping–Li Keqiang Administration =

Leadership of the People's Republic of China from 2013 to 2023

Xi Jinping–Li Keqiang Administration 习近平–李克强体制
- 5th generation Communist leadership of the People's Republic of China

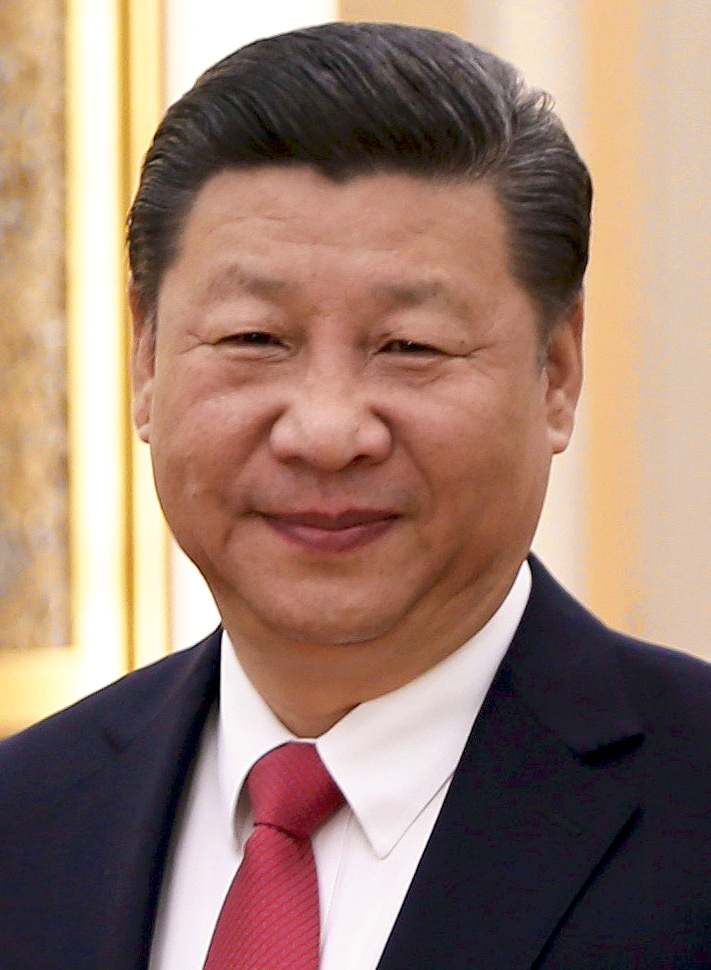
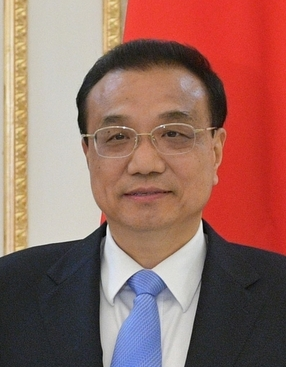
- General Secretary & President Xi Jinping (left); State Council Premier Li Keqiang (right)
- Date formed: 15 March 2013
- Date dissolved: 11 March 2023

People and organisations
- Head of state: Xi Jinping
- Head of government: Li Keqiang
- Deputy head of government: Cabinet I (2013–2018): 1st: Zhang Gaoli 2nd: Liu Yandong 3rd: Wang Yang 4th: Ma Kai; Cabinet II (2018–2023): 1st: Han Zheng 2nd: Sun Chunlan 3rd: Hu Chunhua 4th: Liu He
- Member party: Chinese Communist Party; Eight minor parties

History
- Elections: 5—13 March 2013; 5–13 March 2018
- Legislature terms: XII; XIII
- Predecessor: Hu–Wen Administration
- Successor: Xi Core Administration

The Xi Jinping–Li Keqiang Administration was the administration of China from 2013 to 2023. Xi Jinping and Li Keqiang succeeded Hu Jintao and Wen Jiabao after the 12th National People's Congress.

Xi Jinping replaced Hu Jintao as general secretary of the Chinese Communist Party and president of China, and Li Keqiang replaced Wen Jiabao as premier of the State Council. The rest of the fifth generation of the CCP leadership includes Zhang Dejiang, Yu Zhengsheng, Liu Yunshan, Wang Qishan, Zhang Gaoli, Li Yuanchao, Liu Yandong, and Wang Yang.

The Xi Jinping–Li Keqiang Administration ended following the end of Li Keqiang's term of premiership on 11 March 2023. Li Qiang took over the office of premier of China in March 2023 during the first session of the 14th National People's Congress.

== Functions and powers ==
Party organs	Head	Deputy	Formation
National Security Commission	Xi Jinping	Li Keqiang; Li Zhanshu	January 2014
Central Comprehensively Deepening Reforms Commission	Xi Jinping	Li Keqiang; Wang Huning; Han Zheng	March 2018
Central Financial and Economic Affairs Commission	Xi Jinping	Li Keqiang	March 2018
Central Foreign Affairs Commission	Xi Jinping	Li Keqiang	March 2018
Central Cyberspace Affairs Commission	Xi Jinping	Li Keqiang; Wang Huning	March 2018
Central Military and Civil Integration Development Commission	Xi Jinping	Li Keqiang; Wang Huning	January 2017

== Presidency ==
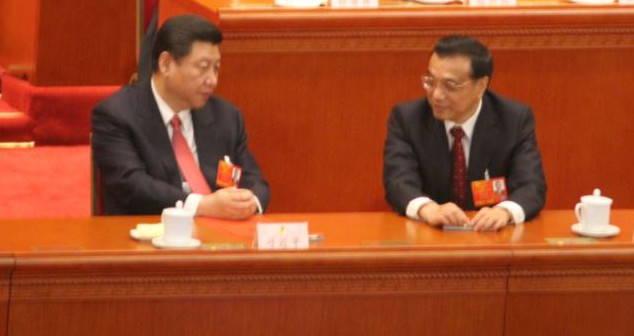
Xi Jinping (left) and Li Keqiang (right)

Office	Officeholder(s)	Tenure
President	Xi Jinping	2013–
Vice President	Li Yuanchao; Wang Qishan	2013–2018; 2018–2023

== National People's Congress and Chinese People's Political Consultative Conference leaders ==
Main articles: 12th National People's Congress, 13th National People's Congress, and Chinese People's Political Consultative Conference

Office	Officeholder(s)	Tenure
Congress Chairperson	Li Zhanshu	2018–
Vice Congress Chairperson(s)	Li Jianguo	2013–
Vice Congress Chairperson(s)	Wang Shengjun	2013–
Vice Congress Chairperson(s)	Chen Changzhi (Democratic National Construction Association Chairman)	2013–
Vice Congress Chairperson(s)	Yan Junqi (female, Association for Promoting Democracy Chairwoman)	2013–
Vice Congress Chairperson(s)	Wang Chen	2013–
Vice Congress Chairperson(s)	Shen Yueyue (female)	2013–
Vice Congress Chairperson(s)	Ji Bingxuan	2013–
Vice Congress Chairperson(s)	Zhang Ping	2013–
Vice Congress Chairperson(s)	Qiangba Puncog (Tibetan)	2013–
Vice Congress Chairperson(s)	Arken Imirbaki (Uyghur)	2013–
Vice Congress Chairperson(s)	Wan Exiang (KMT Revolutionary Committee Chairman)	2013–
Vice Congress Chairperson(s)	Zhang Baowen (Democratic League Chairman)	2013–
Vice Congress Chairperson(s)	Chen Zhu (Peasants' and Workers' Democratic Party Chairman)	2013–

Office	Officeholder(s)	Tenure
Conference Chairperson	Wang Yang	2018–
Vice Conference Chairperson(s)	Du Qinglin	2013–
Vice Conference Chairperson(s)	Ling Jihua (removed and arrested)	2013–
Vice Conference Chairperson(s)	Han Qide (Jiusan Society & Communist Party)	2013–
Vice Conference Chairperson(s)	Pagbalha Geleg Namgyai (Tibetan)	2013–
Vice Conference Chairperson(s)	Tung Chee-hwa (Hong Kong)	2013–
Vice Conference Chairperson(s)	Wan Gang (Zhi Gong Party Chairman)	2013–
Vice Conference Chairperson(s)	Lin Wenyi (female, Taiwan Democratic Self-Government League Chairwoman)	2013–
Vice Conference Chairperson(s)	Luo Fuhe (China Association for Promoting Democracy Vice Chairman)	2013–
Vice Conference Chairperson(s)	Edmund Ho Hau Wah (Macau)	2013–
Vice Conference Chairperson(s)	Zhang Qingli	2013–
Vice Conference Chairperson(s)	Li Haifeng (female)	2013–
Vice Conference Chairperson(s)	Su Rong (removed and arrested)	2013–2014
Vice Conference Chairperson(s)	Chen Yuan	2013–
Vice Conference Chairperson(s)	Lu Zhangong	2013–
Vice Conference Chairperson(s)	Zhou Xiaochuan	2013–
Vice Conference Chairperson(s)	Wang Jiarui	2013–
Vice Conference Chairperson(s)	Wang Zhengwei (Hui)	2013–
Vice Conference Chairperson(s)	Ma Biao	2013–
Vice Conference Chairperson(s)	Qi Xuchun (KMT Revolutionary Committee Vice Chairman)	2013–
Vice Conference Chairperson(s)	Chen Xiaoguang (Democratic League Chairman)	2013–
Vice Conference Chairperson(s)	Ma Peihua (Democratic National Construction Association Vice Chairman)	2013–
Vice Conference Chairperson(s)	Liu Xiaofeng (Peasants' and Workers' Democratic Party Vice Chairman)	2013–
Vice Conference Chairperson(s)	Wang Qinmin (Industry and Commerce Federation Chairman)	2013–

== The State Council ==
Li Keqiang Cabinet I (Members of the 12th State Council) March 2013 – March 2018
Office		Officeholder(s)	Tenure
Premier		Li Keqiang	2013–2018
Vice Premier(s)	(1st)	Zhang Gaoli	2013–2018
Vice Premier(s)	(2nd)	Liu Yandong (female)	2013–2018
Vice Premier(s)	(3rd)	Wang Yang	2013–2018
Vice Premier(s)	(4th)	Ma Kai	2013–
State Councilor(s)	(1st)	Yang Jing (Mongol)*	2013–Feb 2018 (removed)
State Councilor(s)	(2nd)	Gen. Chang Wanquan*	2013–2018
State Councilor(s)	(3rd)	Yang Jiechi	2013–2018
State Councilor(s)	(4th)	Guo Shengkun*	2013–2018
State Councilor(s)	(5th)	Wang Yong	2013–2018
Secretary General		Yang Jing (Mongol)	2013–Feb 2018 (removed)
Foreign Minister		Wang Yi	2013–2018
Defense Minister		Gen. Chang Wanquan	2013–2018
Minister in charge of the National Development and Reform Commission		Xu Shaoshi	2013–2018
Education Minister		Yuan Guiren	2013–2018
Science and Technology Minister		Wan Gang (Zhi Gong Party Chairman)	2013–2018
Industry and Information Minister		Miao Wei	2013–2018
Minister in charge of the State Ethnic Affairs Commission		Wang Zhengwei (Hui)	2013–2016
Minister in charge of the State Ethnic Affairs Commission		Bagatur (Mongol)	2016-2018
Public Security Minister		Guo Shengkun	2013–2018
State Security Minister		Geng Huichang	2013–2018
Supervision Minister		Huang Shuxian	2013–
Civil Affairs Minister		Li Liguo	2013–2018
Justice Minister		Wu Aiying (female)	2013–2018
Finance Minister		Lou Jiwei	2013–2018
Human Resources and Social Security Minister		Yin Weimin	2013–2018
Resources Minister		Jiang Daming	2013–2018
Environment Minister		Zhou Shengxian	2013–2015
Environment Minister		Chen Jining	2015–2018
Construction Minister		Jiang Weixin	2013–2014
Construction Minister		Chen Zhenggao	2014–2018
Transport Minister		Yang Chuantang	2013–2018
Water Minister		Chen Lei	2013–2018
Agriculture Minister		Han Changfu	2013–2018
Commerce Minister		Gao Hucheng	2013–2018
Culture Minister		Cai Wu	2013–2014
Culture Minister		Luo Shugang	2014–2018
Minister in charge of the Health and Family Planning Commission		Li Bin (female)	2013–2018
Central Bank Governor		Zhou Xiaochuan	2013–2018
Auditor General		Liu Jiayi	2013–2018

Li Keqiang Cabinet II (Members of the 13th State Council) March 2018 – 2023
Office		Officeholder(s)	Tenure
Premier		Li Keqiang	2018–
Vice Premier(s)	(1st)	Han Zheng	2018–
Vice Premier(s)	(2nd)	Sun Chunlan (female)	2018–
Vice Premier(s)	(3rd)	Hu Chunhua	2018–
Vice Premier(s)	(4th)	Liu He	2018–
State Councilor(s)	(1st)	Gen. Wei Fenghe*	2018–
State Councilor(s)	(2nd)	Wang Yong	2018–
State Councilor(s)	(3rd)	Wang Yi*	2018–
State Councilor(s)	(4th)	Xiao Jie*	2018–
State Councilor(s)	(5th)	Zhao Kezhi*	2018–
Secretary General		Xiao Jie	2018–
Foreign Minister		Wang Yi	2018–
Defense Minister		Gen. Wei Fenghe	2018–
Central Bank Governor		Yi Gang	2018-
Auditor General		Hu Zejun (female)	2018-

== History and Development ==
=== Formation ===
From 2012 to 2013, China's top leadership transitioned from the "fourth generation" under Hu Jintao to the "fifth generation" led by Xi Jinping. On 15 November 2012, at the First Plenary Session of the 18th Central Committee of the Chinese Communist Party (CCP), Xi Jinping and Li Keqiang were elected to the Politburo Standing Committee of the CCP, ranking first and second respectively. Xi succeeded Hu Jintao as General Secretary of the CCP and Chairman of the Central Military Commission. This pairing was widely regarded as marking the start of the Xi–Li Administration.

The 18th Politburo Standing Committee was reduced from nine to seven members. Apart from Xi and Li, the other five members in order of rank were Zhang Dejiang, Yu Zhengsheng, Liu Yunshan, Wang Qishan, and Zhang Gaoli. Xi and Li were also the first CCP General Secretary and Premier of the State Council, respectively, to have been born after the founding of the People's Republic of China in 1949.

On 14 March 2013, at the fourth plenary meeting of the First Session of the 12th National People's Congress, Xi Jinping was elected President of the PRC and Chairman of the Central Military Commission. Li Keqiang succeeded Wen Jiabao as Premier of the State Council. In December 2013 and January 2014, Xi and Li assumed the positions of head and deputy head, respectively, of the newly established Central Leading Group for Comprehensively Deepening Reforms and the National Security Commission.

At the 19th National Congress of the CCP in October 2017, both Xi Jinping and Li Keqiang were re-elected to the Central Committee with full votes, and were subsequently reappointed to the Politburo Standing Committee at the First Plenary Session of the 19th Central Committee, maintaining their positions as the top two members in party hierarchy.

=== Xi-Li New Policies ===
At the beginning of their terms, both domestically and internationally, the administration was sometimes referred to as the Xi–Li New Policies, analysts observed that Chinese society was approaching a critical historical juncture, and Xi and Li used several high-profile appearances to signal policy priorities and outline reform directions. These included moving away from a GDP-centered development model, reforming institutions to combat corruption, and transitioning from an "economic construction-oriented government" toward a "public service-oriented government". Early in his tenure, Li Keqiang promoted the slogan "Reform is China's greatest dividend (Chinese: 改革是中国最大的红利)", giving rise to what has been termed "Likonomics".

=== Formation of Xi's Core Leadership ===
As the anti-corruption campaign advanced, the political influence of Xi Jinping and Wang Qishan increased. Wang served successively as Secretary of the Central Commission for Discipline Inspection and Vice President of the PRC. At the Sixth Plenary Session of the 18th Central Committee in October 2016, Xi Jinping was officially recognized as the core of the Party's leadership. His political thought was later codified as Xi Jinping Thought on Socialism with Chinese Characteristics for a New Era.

Meanwhile, with Xi assuming leadership of the Central Leading Group for Comprehensively Deepening Reforms and the National Security Commission, his authority expanded into areas previously under the State Council and Premier Li's control. Li Keqiang's power correspondingly narrowed, limited largely to administrative responsibilities. This marked a significant shift in the structure and operation of China's central leadership compared with the previous "Hu–Wen Administration". The Party under Xi's leadership was consolidated into a centralized authority, described by analysts as marking the effective decline of the collective leadership system established since Deng Xiaoping.

=== Tensions within the Xi–Li Administration ===
As Xi Jinping's second term as General Secretary progressed, particularly after the outbreak of COVID-19 in mainland China, reports began circulating of disagreements between Xi and Premier Li Keqiang. Some observers interpreted Li's public statements in his capacity as head of the State Council as occasionally diverging from Xi's policy line.

For example, in early 2020, under Xi's "dynamic zero-COVID" policy, Li proposed measures such as promoting the "street vendor economy" to quickly restore economic activity; however, these initiatives were subsequently halted. Certain foreign media, including Radio France Internationale, portraying him as a cautious bureaucrat or "middle-ranking administrator". Later that year, at a State Council press conference, Li remarked that approximately 600 million low- and middle-income people in China earned around 1,000 RMB per month on average, drawing widespread domestic and international attention. This statement was also seen by some analysts as undermining Xi's poverty alleviation achievements and potentially impacting the goal of building a moderately prosperous society by 2021.

During the August 2020 opening ceremony of the BeiDou-3 satellite system, Li reportedly faced an awkward situation in which attendees were not given the opportunity to applaud him, and Xi was described as expressing visible disdain, which some interpreted as a public manifestation of tensions within the leadership.

By 2022, as the strict "dynamic zero-COVID" measures began to affect the economy and public confidence in the government, perceptions of escalating tensions between Xi and Li increased. In the lead-up to the 20th National Congress, speculation intensified, including political rumors such as a hypothetical "Xi steps down, Li steps up" scenario.

=== Li Qiang succeeded ===
On 23 October 2022, at the First Plenary Session of the 20th Central Committee of the CCP, Li Keqiang was succeeded by Li Qiang as the second-ranking member of the Politburo Standing Committee, immediately after Xi Jinping.

== See also ==
- Generations of Chinese leadership
- Li Keqiang Government
- Anti-corruption campaign under Xi Jinping

Preceded by Hu–Wen Administration	PRC leadership 5th generation	Succeeded by Xi Jinping–Li Qiang Administration
