= Vice Chairperson of the National Committee of the Chinese People's Political Consultative Conference =

- 中国人民政治协商会议 全国委员会副主席
- Emblem of the Chinese People's Political Consultative Conference
- National Committee of the Chinese People's Political Consultative Conference
- Status: Deputy national-level official
- Member of: Standing Committee of the National Committee; Chairperson's Council
- Nominator: Presidium of the Plenary Session of the National Committee (chosen within the Chinese Communist Party)
- Appointer: Plenary Session of the National Committee
- Term length: Five years
- Constituting instrument: Charter of the CPPCC
- Formation: 21 September 1949; 76 years ago

The vice chairpersons of the National Committee of the Chinese People's Political Consultative Conference (CPPCC) are deputies to the chairman of the Chinese People's Political Consultative Conference. The official responsibility of the vice chairpersons is to assist the CPPCC chairman with the leadership of the CPPCC Standing Committee.

The vice chairpersons are officially nominated within the CPPCC National Committee and approved by a plenary session of the National Committee. The vice chairpersons are members of the Standing Committee of the National Committee, which handles the regular affairs of the body, and members of the Chairperson's Council, which handles the day-to-day affairs of the Standing Committee.

The head of the United Front Work Department (UFWD) of the Chinese Communist Party (CCP) has generally served as the first-ranking vice chairperson. The other vice chairpersons have generally included the president of the Chinese Academy of Social Sciences, former chief executives of Hong Kong and Macau, director of the Hong Kong and Macao Affairs Office, president of the All-China Federation of Industry and Commerce, and at least one chairperson of one of the eight legally permitted political parties in China.

== History ==
News reports have suggested that the position of CPPCC Vice Chairperson, as a state-level post with a retirement age of 70, has been used as a device to extend the services of valued officials beyond the typical retirement age for their position. The appointment of People's Bank of China Governor Zhou Xiaochuan as a vice chairperson in 2013 was said to be for this purpose.

== List of officeholders ==
Name (birth–death)	Hanzi	Portrait	Took office	Left office	Tenure	Term(s)
Zhou Enlai (1898–1976)	周恩来		8 October 1949	25 December 1954	5 years, 139 days	1st
Li Jishen (1885–1959)	李济深		8 October 1949	9 October 1959	10 years, 62 days	1st, 2nd, 3rd
Shen Junru (1875–1963)	沈钧儒		8 October 1949	11 June 1963	13 years, 307 days	1st, 2nd, 3rd
Guo Moruo (1892–1978)	郭沫若		8 October 1949	5 January 1965	15 years, 150 days	1st, 2nd, 3rd
Guo Moruo (1892–1978)	郭沫若		8 March 1978	12 June 1978	96 days	5th
Chen Shutong (1876–1966)	陈叔通		25 December 1954	17 February 1966	16 years, 54 days	1st, 2nd, 3rd, 4th
Song Qingling (1893–1981)	宋庆龄		25 December 1954	29 April 1959	4 years, 125 days	2nd
Dong Biwu (1886–1975)	董必武		25 December 1954	29 April 1959	4 years, 125 days	2nd
Zhang Lan (1872–1955)	张澜		25 December 1954	9 February 1955	46 days	2nd
Peng Zhen (1902–1997)	彭真		25 December 1954	8 March 1978	23 years, 73 days	2nd, 3rd, 4th
Huang Yanpei (1878–1965)	黄炎培		25 December 1954	5 January 1965	10 years, 11 days	2nd, 3rd, 4th
He Xiangning (1878–1972)	何香凝		25 December 1954	5 January 1965	10 years, 11 days	2nd, 3rd
Li Weihan (1896–1984)	李维汉		25 December 1954	5 January 1965	10 years, 11 days	2nd, 3rd, 4th
Li Weihan (1896–1984)	李维汉		2 July 1979	17 June 1983	3 years, 350 days	5th
Li Siguang (1889–1971)	李四光		25 December 1954	26 February 1971	16 years, 63 days	2nd, 3rd, 4th
Zhang Bojun (1885–1969)	章伯钧		25 December 1954	29 April 1959	4 years, 125 days	2nd
Tan Kah Kee (1874–1961)	陈嘉庚		25 December 1954	12 August 1961	6 years, 230 days	2nd, 3rd
Choekyi Gyaltsen (1938–1989)	确吉坚赞		25 December 1954	5 January 1965	10 years, 11 days	2nd, 3rd
Choekyi Gyaltsen (1938–1989)	确吉坚赞		2 July 1979	17 June 1983	3 years, 350 days	5th
Burhan Shahidi (1894–1989)	包尔汉·沙希迪		25 December 1954	5 January 1965	10 years, 11 days	2nd, 3rd
Burhan Shahidi (1894–1989)	包尔汉·沙希迪		12 September 1980	10 April 1988	7 years, 211 days	5th
Chen Yi (1901–1972)	陈毅		29 April 1959	6 January 1972	12 years, 252 days	3rd, 4th
Kang Sheng (1898–1975)	康生		29 April 1959	5 January 1965	5 years, 251 days	3rd
Pagbalha Namgyal (born 1940)	帕巴拉·格列朗杰		29 April 1959	27 March 1993	33 years, 332 days	3rd, 4th, 5th, 6th, 7th
Pagbalha Namgyal (born 1940)	帕巴拉·格列朗杰		13 March 2003	Incumbent	23 years, 186 days	10th, 11th, 12th, 13th, 14th
Ngapoi Ngawang Jigme (1910–2009)	阿沛·阿旺晋美		29 April 1959	5 January 1965	5 years, 251 days	3rd
Ngapoi Ngawang Jigme (1910–2009)	阿沛·阿旺晋美		27 March 1993	23 December 2009	16 years, 271 days	8th, 9th, 10, 11th
Ye Jianying (1897–1986)	叶剑英		5 January 1965	8 March 1978	13 years, 62 days	4th
Liu Lantao (1910–1997)	刘澜涛		5 January 1965	31 October 1968	3 years, 300 days	4th
Liu Lantao (1910–1997)	刘澜涛		2 July 1979	10 April 1988	8 years, 252 days	5th, 6th
Song Renqiong (1909–2005)	宋任穷		5 January 1965	17 June 1983	18 years, 163 days	4th, 5th
Xu Bing (1903–1972)	徐冰		5 January 1965	22 March 1972	7 years, 77 days	4th
Gao Chongmin (1891–1971)	高崇民		5 January 1965	29 July 1971	6 years, 205 days	4th
Cai Tingkai (1892–1968)	蔡廷锴		5 January 1965	25 April 1968	3 years, 111 days	4th
Wei Guoqing (1913–1990)	韦国清		5 January 1965	17 June 1983	18 years, 163 days	4th, 5th
Deng Zihui (1896–1972)	邓子恢		5 January 1965	10 December 1972	7 years, 340 days	4th
Fu Zuoyi (1895–1974)	傅作义		5 January 1965	19 April 1974	9 years, 104 days	4th
Teng Daiyuan (1904–1974)	滕代远		5 January 1965	1 December 1974	9 years, 330 days	4th
Xie Juezai (1884–1971)	谢觉哉		5 January 1965	15 June 1971	9 years, 330 days	4th
Mao Dun (1896–1981)	茅盾		5 January 1965	17 June 1983	18 years, 163 days	4th, 5th
Li Zhuchen (1882–1968)	李烛尘		5 January 1965	7 October 1968	3 years, 276 days	4th
Xu Deheng (1890–1990)	許德珩		5 January 1965	17 June 1983	18 years, 163 days	4th, 5th
Li Dequan (1896–1972)	李德全		5 January 1965	23 April 1972	7 years, 109 days	4th
Ma Xulun (1885–1972)	马叙伦		5 January 1965	4 May 1970	5 years, 119 days	4th
Ulanhu (1906–1988)	乌兰夫		8 March 1978	17 June 1983	5 years, 101 days	5th
Peng Chong (1915–2010)	彭冲	—	8 March 1978	17 June 1983	5 years, 101 days	5th
Zhao Ziyang (1919–2005)	赵紫阳		8 March 1978	17 June 1983	5 years, 101 days	5th
Ouyang Qin (1900–1978)	欧阳钦		8 March 1978	15 May 1978	68 days	5th
Shi Liang (1900–1985)	史良		8 March 1978	17 June 1983	5 years, 101 days	5th
Zhu Yunshan (1887–1981)	朱蘊山		8 March 1978	30 April 1981	3 years, 53 days	5th
Kang Keqing (1911–1992)	康克清		8 March 1978	22 April 1992	14 years, 45 days	5th, 6th, 7th,
Ji Fang (1890–1987)	季方		8 March 1978	17 December 1987	9 years, 284 days	5th, 6th
Wang Shoudao (1906–1996)	王首道		8 March 1978	17 June 1983	5 years, 101 days	5th
Yang Jingren (1918–2001)	楊靜仁		8 March 1978	13 March 1998	20 years, 5 days	5th, 6th, 7th, 8th
Zhang Chong (1900–1980)	张冲		8 March 1978	30 October 1980	2 years, 236 days	5th
Zhou Jianren (1888–1984)	周建人		8 March 1978	29 July 1984	6 years, 143 days	5th, 6th
Zhuang Xiquan (1888–1988)	庄希泉	—	8 March 1978	14 May 1988	10 years, 67 days	5th, 6th, 7th
Hu Zi'ang (1897–1991)	胡子昂		8 March 1978	19 November 1991	13 years, 256 days	5th, 6th, 7th
Rong Yiren (1916–2005)	荣毅仁		8 March 1978	17 June 1983	5 years, 101 days	5th
Tong Dizhou (1902–1979)	童第周		8 March 1978	30 March 1979	1 year, 22 days	5th
Lu Dingyi (1906–1996)	陆定一		2 July 1979	17 June 1983	3 years, 350 days	5th
Hu Yuzhi (1896–1986)	胡愈之		2 July 1979	17 June 1983	3 years, 350 days	5th
Wang Kunlun (1902–1986)	王昆侖		2 July 1979	23 August 1985	4 years, 52 days	5th, 6th
He Changgong (1900–1987)	何长工		12 September 1980	17 June 1983	2 years, 278 days	5th
Xiao Ke (1907–2008)	萧克		12 September 1980	17 June 1983	2 years, 278 days	5th
Cheng Zihua (1905–1991)	程子华		12 September 1980	10 April 1988	7 years, 211 days	5th, 6th
Yang Xiufeng (1897–1983)	杨秀峰		12 September 1980	17 June 1983	2 years, 278 days	5th
Sha Qianli (1901–1982)	沙千里		12 September 1980	26 April 1982	1 year, 226 days	5th
Zhou Peiyuan (1902–1993)	周培源		12 September 1980	24 November 1993	13 years, 73 days	5th, 6th, 7th, 8th
Qian Changzhao (1899–1988)	錢昌照		12 September 1980	10 April 1988	7 years, 211 days	5th, 6th
Liu Fei (1898–1983)	劉斐		14 December 1981	8 April 1983	1 year, 115 days	5th
Dong Qiwu (1899–1989)	董其武		14 December 1981	10 April 1988	6 years, 118 days	5th, 6th
Tao Zhiyue (1892–1988)	陶峙岳		17 June 1983	10 April 1988	4 years, 298 days	6th
Zhou Shutao (1891–1984)	周叔弢		17 June 1983	14 February 1984	242 days	6th
Yang Chengwu (1914–2004)	杨成武		17 June 1983	10 April 1988	4 years, 298 days	6th
Xiao Hua (1916–1985)	萧华		17 June 1983	12 August 1985	2 years, 56 days	6th
Chen Zaidao (1909–1993)	陈再道		17 June 1983	10 April 1988	4 years, 298 days	6th
Lü Zhengcao (1904–2009)	吕正操		17 June 1983	10 April 1988	4 years, 298 days	6th
Miao Yuntai (1894–1988)	缪云台		17 June 1983	10 April 1988	4 years, 298 days	6th
Wang Guangying (1919–2018)	王光英	—	17 June 1983	27 March 1993	9 years, 283 days	6th, 7th
Deng Zhaoxiang (1903–1998)	邓兆祥		17 June 1983	13 March 1998	14 years, 269 days	6th, 7th, 8th
Fei Xiaotong (1910–2005)	费孝通		17 June 1983	10 April 1988	4 years, 298 days	6th
Zhao Puchu (1907–2000)	趙樸初	—	17 June 1983	21 May 2000	16 years, 339 days	6th, 7th, 8th, 9th
Ye Shengtao (1894–1988)	叶圣陶		17 June 1983	16 February 1988	4 years, 244 days	6th
Qu Wu (1898–1992)	屈武		17 June 1983	27 March 1993	9 years, 283 days	6th, 7th
Ba Jin (1904–2005)	李尧棠		17 June 1983	17 October 2005	22 years, 122 days	6th, 7th, 8th, 9th, 10th
Ma Wenrui (1912–2004)	马文瑞	—	26 May 1984	27 March 1993	8 years, 305 days	6th, 7th
Mao Yisheng (1896–1989)	茅以升		26 May 1984	10 April 1988	3 years, 320 days	6th, 7th
Liu Jingji (1902–1997)	刘靖基	—	26 May 1984	15 February 1997	12 years, 265 days	6th, 7th, 8th
Hua Luogeng (1910–1985)	华罗庚		8 April 1985	12 June 1985	65 days	6th
Wang Enmao (1913–2001)	王恩茂		11 April 1986	27 March 1993	6 years, 350 days	6th, 7th
Qian Xuesen (1911–2009)	钱学森		11 April 1986	27 March 1993	6 years, 350 days	6th, 7th
Lei Jieqiong (1905–2011)	雷洁琼		11 April 1986	10 April 1988	3 years, 365 days	6th, 7th
Wang Feng (1910–1998)	汪锋		8 April 1987	10 April 1988	1 year, 2 days	6th, 7th
Chien Wei-zang (1912–2010)	钱伟长		8 April 1987	13 March 2003	15 years, 339 days	6th, 7th, 8th, 9th, 10th
Wang Renzhong (1917–1992)	王任重		10 April 1988	16 March 1992	3 years, 341 days	7th
Yan Mingfu (1931–2023)	阎明复	—	10 April 1988	14 March 1990	1 year, 338 days	7th
Fang Yi (1916–1997)	方毅		10 April 1988	27 March 1993	4 years, 351 days	7th
Gu Mu (1914–2009)	谷牧		10 April 1988	27 March 1993	4 years, 351 days	7th
Hu Sheng (1914–2009)	胡绳		10 April 1988	13 March 1998	9 years, 337 days	7th, 8th
Sun Xiaocun (1906–1991)	孙晓村		10 April 1988	4 May 1991	3 years, 24 days	7th
Cheng Siyuan (1908–2005)	程思远		10 April 1988	27 March 1993	4 years, 351 days	7th
Lu Jiaxi (1915–2001)	卢嘉锡		10 April 1988	27 March 1993	4 years, 351 days	7th
Lu Jiaxi (1915–2001)	卢嘉锡		13 March 1998	4 June 2001	3 years, 83 days	9th
Su Buqing (1902–2003)	蘇步青	—	10 April 1988	13 March 1998	9 years, 337 days	7th, 8th
Ismail Amat (1935–2018)	司马义·艾买提	—	10 April 1988	27 March 1993	4 years, 351 days	7th
Hou Jingru (1902–1994)	侯镜如	—	27 March 1989	25 October 1994	5 years, 212 days	7th, 8th
Ding Guangxun (1915–2012)	丁光训	—	27 March 1989	13 March 2008	18 years, 352 days	7th, 8th, 9th, 10th
Hong Xuezhi (1913–2006)	洪学智		29 March 1990	13 March 1998	7 years, 349 days	7th, 8th
Ye Xuanping (1924–2019)	叶选平	—	April 1991	13 March 2003	11 years, 346 days	7th, 8th, 9th, 10th
Wu Xueqian (1921–2008)	吴学谦		27 March 1993	13 March 1998	4 years, 351 days	8th
Yang Rudai (1926–2018)	杨汝岱	—	27 March 1993	13 March 2003	9 years, 351 days	8th, 9th
Wang Zhaoguo (born 1941)	王兆国		27 March 1993	13 March 2003	9 years, 351 days	8th, 9th
Saifuddin Azizi (1915–2003)	赛福鼎·艾则孜		27 March 1993	13 March 1998	4 years, 351 days	8th
Qian Zhengying (1923–2022)	钱正英	—	27 March 1993	13 March 2003	9 years, 351 days	8th
Dong Yinchu (1915–2009)	董寅初	—	27 March 1993	13 March 1998	4 years, 351 days	8th
Sun Fuling (1921–2018)	孙孚凌	—	27 March 1993	13 March 2003	9 years, 351 days	8th, 9th
Tse Kai Ann (1912–2000)	安子介	—	27 March 1993	3 June 2000	7 years, 68 days	8th, 9th
Huo Guantai (1923–2006)	霍官泰	—	27 March 1993	13 March 1998	4 years, 351 days	8th
Huo Guantai (1923–2006)	霍官泰	—	13 March 2003	28 October 2006	3 years, 229 days	10th
Ma Man-kei (1919–2014)	馬萬祺		27 March 1993	11 March 2013	19 years, 349 days	8th, 9th, 10th
Zhu Guangya (1924–2011)	朱光亚	—	13 March 1996	13 March 1998	5 years, 0 days	8th
Wan Guoquan (1919–2017)	万国权	—	13 March 1996	13 March 1998	5 years, 0 days	8th
He Luli (1934–2022)	何魯麗	—	13 March 1996	13 March 1998	5 years, 0 days	8th
Ren Jianxin (1925–2024)	任建新	—	13 March 1998	13 March 2003	5 years, 0 days	9th
Song Jian (born 1931)	宋健	—	13 March 1998	13 March 2003	5 years, 0 days	9th
Li Guixian (born 1937)	李贵鲜	—	13 March 1998	13 March 2003	5 years, 0 days	9th
Chen Junsheng (1927–2002)	陈俊生	—	13 March 1998	8 August 2002	4 years, 148 days	9th
Zhang Siqing (1932–2022)	张思卿	—	13 March 1998	13 March 2003	5 years, 0 days	9th
Hu Qili (born 1929)	胡启立	—	13 March 1998	13 March 2003	5 years, 0 days	9th
Chen Jinhua (1929–2016)	陈锦华	—	13 March 1998	13 March 2003	5 years, 0 days	9th
Zhao Nanqi (1927–2018)	趙南起	—	13 March 1998	13 March 2003	5 years, 0 days	9th
Mao Zhiyong (1929–2019)	毛致用	—	13 March 1998	13 March 2003	5 years, 0 days	9th
Bai Lichen (born 1941)	白立忱		13 March 1998	11 March 2013	14 years, 363 days	9th
Jing Shuping (1918–2009)	經叔平	—	13 March 1998	13 March 2003	5 years, 0 days	9th
Luo Haocai (1934–2018)	罗豪才	—	13 March 1998	13 March 2003	5 years, 0 days	9th
Zhang Kehui (1928–2024)	张克辉	—	13 March 1998	13 March 2003	5 years, 0 days	9th
Zhou Tienong (1938–2023)	周铁农	—	13 March 1998	13 March 2008	10 years, 0 days	9th, 10th
Wang Wenyuan (1931–2014)	王文元	—	13 March 1998	13 March 2003	5 years, 0 days	9th
Wang Zhongyu (born 1933)	王忠禹	—	13 March 2003	13 March 2008	5 years, 0 days	10th
Liao Hui (born 1942)	廖暉	—	13 March 2003	11 March 2013	9 years, 363 days	10th, 11th
Liu Yandong (born 1945)	刘延东		13 March 2003	13 March 2008	5 years, 0 days	10th
Hao Jianxiu (born 1935)	郝建秀		13 March 2003	13 March 2008	5 years, 0 days	10th
Chen Kuiyuan (born 1941)	陈奎元		13 March 2003	11 March 2013	9 years, 363 days	10th, 11th
Abdul'ahat Abdulrixit (born 1942)	阿不来提·阿不都热西提	—	13 March 2003	11 March 2013	9 years, 363 days	10th, 11th
Xu Kuangdi (born 1937)	徐匡迪		13 March 2003	13 March 2008	5 years, 0 days	10th
Li Zhaozhuo (born 1944)	李兆焯	—	13 March 2003	11 March 2013	9 years, 363 days	10th, 11th
Huang Mengfu (born 1944)	黄孟复		13 March 2003	11 March 2013	9 years, 363 days	10th, 11th
Wang Xuan (1937–2006)	王选	—	13 March 2003	13 February 2006	2 years, 337 days	10th
Zhang Huaixi (born 1935)	张怀西	—	13 March 2003	13 March 2008	5 years, 0 days	10th
Li Meng (born 1937)	李蒙	—	13 March 2003	13 March 2008	5 years, 0 days	10th
Tung Chee-hwa (1937–2026)	董建華		12 March 2005	10 March 2023	17 years, 363 days	10th, 11th, 12th, 13th
Zhang Meiying (born 1937)	张梅颖	—	12 March 2005	11 March 2013	9 years, 364 days	10th, 11th
Zhang Rongming (born 1944)	张榕明	—	12 March 2005	13 March 2008	5 years, 1 day	10th
Wang Gang (born 1942)	王刚		13 March 2008	11 March 2013	4 years, 363 days	11th, 12th
Du Qinglin (born 1946)	杜青林		13 March 2008	14 March 2018	10 years, 1 day	11th, 12th
Chang Yungming (born 1944)	张榕明	—	13 March 2008	11 March 2013	4 years, 363 days	11th
Qian Yunlu (born 1944)	钱运录		13 March 2008	11 March 2013	4 years, 363 days	11th
Sun Jiazheng (born 1944)	孙家正		13 March 2008	11 March 2013	4 years, 363 days	11th
Li Jinhua (born 1943)	李金华	—	13 March 2008	11 March 2013	4 years, 363 days	11th
Zheng Wantong (born 1941)	郑万通	—	13 March 2008	11 March 2013	4 years, 363 days	11th
Deng Pufang (born 1944)	邓朴方	—	13 March 2008	11 March 2013	4 years, 363 days	11th
Lin Wenyi (born 1944)	林文漪	—	13 March 2008	14 March 2018	10 years, 1 day	11th, 12th
Li Wuwei (born 1942)	厉无畏	—	13 March 2008	11 March 2013	4 years, 363 days	11th
Luo Fuhe (born 1949)	罗富和	—	13 March 2008	14 March 2018	10 years, 1 day	11th, 12th
Chen Zongxing (born 1943)	陈宗兴	—	13 March 2008	11 March 2013	4 years, 363 days	11th
Wang Zhizhen (born 1942)	王志珍		13 March 2008	11 March 2013	4 years, 363 days	11th
Edmund Ho Hau-wah (born 1955)	何厚鏵		13 March 2010	Incumbent	16 years, 186 days	11th, 12th, 13th, 14th
Ling Jihua (born 1956)	令计划		11 March 2013	28 February 2015	1 year, 354 days	12th
Han Qide (born 1945)	韩启德		11 March 2013	14 March 2018	5 years, 3 days	12th
Wan Gang (born 1952)	万钢		11 March 2013	10 March 2023	9 years, 364 days	12th, 13th
Zhang Qingli (born 1951)	张庆黎		11 March 2013	10 March 2023	9 years, 364 days	12th, 13th
Li Haifeng (born 1949)	李海峰	—	11 March 2013	14 March 2018	5 years, 3 days	12th
Su Rong (born 1948)	苏荣	—	11 March 2013	25 June 2014	1 year, 106 days	12th
Chen Yuan (born 1945)	陈元	—	11 March 2013	14 March 2018	5 years, 3 days	12th
Lu Zhangong (born 1952)	卢展工		11 March 2013	10 March 2023	9 years, 364 days	12th, 13th
Zhou Xiaochuan (born 1948)	周小川		11 March 2013	14 March 2018	5 years, 3 days	12th
Wang Jiarui (born 1949)	王家瑞		11 March 2013	14 March 2018	5 years, 3 days	12th
Wang Zhengwei (born 1957)	王正伟		11 March 2013	10 March 2023	9 years, 364 days	12th, 13th
Ma Biao (born 1954)	马飚		11 March 2013	10 March 2023	9 years, 364 days	12th, 13th
Qi Xuchun (born 1946)	齐续春	—	11 March 2013	14 March 2018	5 years, 3 days	12th
Chen Xiaoguang (born 1955)	陈晓光		11 March 2013	10 March 2023	9 years, 364 days	12th, 13th
Ma Peihua (born 1949)	马培华	—	11 March 2013	14 March 2018	5 years, 3 days	12th
Liu Xiaofeng (born 1947)	刘晓峰		11 March 2013	14 March 2018	5 years, 3 days	12th
Wang Qinmin (born 1948)	王钦敏	—	11 March 2013	14 March 2018	5 years, 3 days	12th
Leung Chun-ying (born 1954)	梁振英		13 March 2017	Incumbent	9 years, 186 days	12th, 13th, 14th
Liu Qibao (born 1953)	刘奇葆		14 March 2018	10 March 2023	4 years, 361 days	13th
Xia Baolong (born 1952)	夏宝龙		14 March 2018	10 March 2023	4 years, 361 days	13th
Yang Chuantang (born 1954)	杨传堂		14 March 2018	10 March 2023	4 years, 361 days	13th
Li Bin (born 1954)	李斌		14 March 2018	10 March 2023	4 years, 361 days	13th
Bagatur (born 1955)	巴特尔		14 March 2018	Incumbent	8 years, 185 days	13th, 14th
Wang Yongqing (born 1959)	汪永清		14 March 2018	10 March 2023	4 years, 361 days	13th
He Lifeng (born 1955)	何立峰		14 March 2018	10 March 2023	4 years, 361 days	13th
Su Hui (born 1956)	苏辉		14 March 2018	Incumbent	8 years, 185 days	13th, 14th
Zheng Jianbang (born 1957)	郑建邦	—	14 March 2018	10 March 2023	4 years, 361 days	13th
Gu Shengzu (born 1956)	辜胜阻	—	14 March 2018	10 March 2023	4 years, 361 days	13th
Liu Xincheng (born 1952)	刘新成	—	14 March 2018	10 March 2023	4 years, 361 days	13th
He Wei (born 1955)	何维	—	14 March 2018	10 March 2023	4 years, 361 days	13th
Shao Hong (born 1957)	邵鸿	—	14 March 2018	Incumbent	8 years, 185 days	13th, 14th
Gao Yunlong (born 1958)	高云龙	—	14 March 2018	Incumbent	8 years, 185 days	13th, 14th
Shi Taifeng (born 1956)	石泰峰	—	10 March 2023	Incumbent	3 years, 189 days	14th
Hu Chunhua (born 1956)	胡春华		10 March 2023	Incumbent	3 years, 189 days	14th
Shen Yueyue (born 1957)	沈跃跃	—	10 March 2023	Incumbent	3 years, 189 days	14th
Wang Yong (born 1955)	王勇		10 March 2023	Incumbent	3 years, 189 days	14th
Zhou Qiang (born 1960)	周强		10 March 2023	Incumbent	3 years, 189 days	14th
Chen Wu (1954–2026)	陈武		10 March 2023	24 August 2026	3 years, 167 days	14th
Mu Hong (born 1956)	穆虹	—	10 March 2023	Incumbent	3 years, 189 days	14th
Xian Hui (born 1958)	咸辉		10 March 2023	Incumbent	3 years, 189 days	14th
Wang Dongfeng (born 1958)	王东峰		10 March 2023	Incumbent	3 years, 189 days	14th
Jiang Xinzhi (born 1958)	姜信治	—	10 March 2023	Incumbent	3 years, 189 days	14th
Jiang Zuojun (born 1955)	蒋作君		10 March 2023	Incumbent	3 years, 189 days	14th
He Baoxiang (born 1963)	何报翔		10 March 2023	Incumbent	3 years, 189 days	14th
Wang Guangqian (born 1962)	王光谦	—	10 March 2023	Incumbent	3 years, 189 days	14th
Qin Boyong (born 1964)	秦博勇	—	10 March 2023	Incumbent	3 years, 189 days	14th
Zhu Yongxin (born 1958)	朱永新	—	10 March 2023	Incumbent	3 years, 189 days	14th
Yang Zhen (born 1961)	杨震	—	10 March 2023	Incumbent	3 years, 189 days	14th

== See also ==
- National Committee of the Chinese People's Political Consultative Conference
  - Chairperson
  - Secretary-General
- Standing Committee of the National People's Congress
  - Vice Chairpersons
