= 12th National Committee of the Chinese People's Political Consultative Conference =

12th National Committee of the Chinese People's Political Consultative Conference 中国人民政治协商会议第十二届全国委员会
- Emblem of the Chinese People's Political Consultative Conference

3 March 2013 – 3 March 2018 Overview
- Type: Advisory body

Leadership
- Chairman: Yu Zhengsheng
- Vice Chairmen: Du Qinglin, Ling Jihua, Han Qide, Pagbalha Geleg Namgyai, Tung Chee-hwa, Wan Gang, Lin Wenyi, Luo Fuhe, Edmund Ho, Zhang Qingli, Li Haifeng, Su Rong, Chen Yuan, Lu Zhangong, Zhou Xiaochuan, Wang Jiarui, Wang Zhengwei, Ma Biao, Qi Xuchun, Chen Xiaoguang, Ma Peihua, Liu Xiaofeng, Wang Qinmin, Leung Chun-ying
- Secretary-General: Zhang Qingli
- Standing Committee: 299

Members
- Total: 2,237 members

The 12th National Committee of the Chinese People's Political Consultative Conference was the meeting of the top political advisory body of the People's Republic of China. It convened in Beijing on 3 March 2013 and ended on 3 March 2018.

== Seat distribution ==
The 2,237 members in the 12th National Committee of CPPCC was composed of:

=== Seats for political parties (544 in total) ===
Major party	Seats
Chinese Communist Party	99
Other Parties	Seats
Revolutionary Committee of the Chinese Kuomintang	65
China Democratic League	65
China National Democratic Construction Association	65
China Association for Promoting Democracy	45
Chinese Peasants' and Workers' Democratic Party	45
China Zhi Gong Party	30
Jiusan Society	45
Taiwan Democratic Self-Government League	20
Independents	65

=== Seats for people's organizations (320 in total) ===
People's organization	Seats
Communist Youth League of China	9
All-China Federation of Trade Unions	63
All-China Women's Federation	67
All-China Youth Federation	30
All-China Federation of Industry and Commerce	65
China Association for Science and Technology	43
All-China Federation of Taiwan Compatriots	15
All-China Federation of Returned Overseas Chinese	28

=== Seats for Sectoral representatives (1054 in total) ===
Sector	Seats
Literature and Arts	145
Science and Technology	112
Social Science	69
Economics	151
Agriculture	67
Education	108
Sports	21
Press and Publication	44
Medicine and Health	90
Friendship with Foreign Countries	41
Social Welfare and Social Security	36
Ethnic Minorities	103
Religions	67

=== Specially invited deputies (319 in total) ===
Hong Kong (124 in total)	Seats
Democratic Alliance for the Betterment and Progress of Hong Kong	?
Business and Professionals Alliance for Hong Kong	?
Hong Kong Federation of Trade Unions	?
Liberal Party	?
New Century Forum	?
New Territories Association of Societies	?
Independents	?
Macau (29 in total)	Seats
Macau United Citizens Association	?
Macau Business Interest Union	?
Macau Union of Professional Interests	?
Progress Promotion Union/General Union of the Macao Residents' Associations	?
Union for Development/The Women's General Association of Macau	?
Independents	?
Other	Seats
Other (including People's Liberation Army and the People's Armed Police service personnel)	166

== Organization ==
=== Council of Chairpersons ===
		Party	Term
Chairman	Yu Zhengsheng	CCP	11 Mar. 2013 – 14 Mar. 2018
Vice Chairpersons	Du Qinglin	CCP	11 Mar. 2013 – 14 Mar. 2018
Vice Chairpersons	Ling Jihua	CCP	11 Mar. 2013 – 20 Jan. 2015
Vice Chairpersons	Han Qide	JS	11 Mar. 2013 – 14 Mar. 2018
Vice Chairpersons	Pagbalha Geleg Namgyai	Ind.	11 Mar. 2013 – 14 Mar. 2018
Vice Chairpersons	Tung Chee-hwa	Ind.	11 Mar. 2013 – 14 Mar. 2018
Vice Chairpersons	Wan Gang	CZGP	11 Mar. 2013 – 14 Mar. 2018
Vice Chairpersons	Lin Wenyi	TDSL	11 Mar. 2013 – 14 Mar. 2018
Vice Chairpersons	Luo Fuhe	CAPD	11 Mar. 2013 – 14 Mar. 2018
Vice Chairpersons	Edmund Ho	Ind.	11 Mar. 2013 – 14 Mar. 2018
Vice Chairpersons	Zhang Qingli	CCP	11 Mar. 2013 – 14 Mar. 2018
Vice Chairpersons	Li Haifeng	CCP	11 Mar. 2013 – 14 Mar. 2018
Vice Chairpersons	Su Rong	CCP	11 Mar. 2013 – 14 Mar. 2018
Vice Chairpersons	Chen Yuan	CCP	11 Mar. 2013 – 14 Mar. 2018
Vice Chairpersons	Lu Zhangong	CCP	11 Mar. 2013 – 14 Mar. 2018
Vice Chairpersons	Zhou Xiaochuan	CCP	11 Mar. 2013 – 14 Mar. 2018
Vice Chairpersons	Wang Jiarui	CCP	11 Mar. 2013 – 14 Mar. 2018
Vice Chairpersons	Wang Zhengwei	CCP	11 Mar. 2013 – 14 Mar. 2018
Vice Chairpersons	Ma Biao	CCP	11 Mar. 2013 – 14 Mar. 2018
Vice Chairpersons	Qi Xuchun	RCCK	11 Mar. 2013 – 14 Mar. 2018
Vice Chairpersons	Chen Xiaoguang	CDL	11 Mar. 2013 – 14 Mar. 2018
Vice Chairpersons	Ma Peihua	CNDCA	11 Mar. 2013 – 14 Mar. 2018
Vice Chairpersons	Liu Xiaofeng	CPWDP	11 Mar. 2013 – 14 Mar. 2018
Vice Chairpersons	Wang Qinmin	CZGP	11 Mar. 2013 – 14 Mar. 2018
Vice Chairpersons	Leung Chun-ying	Ind.	13 Mar. 2017 – 14 Mar. 2018
Secretary-General	Xia Baolong	CCP	11 Mar. 2013 – 14 Mar. 2018

=== Special Committees ===
Special committee	Chairperson
Committee for Handling Proposals	Sun Gan
Committee for Economic Affairs	Zhou Bohua
Committee of Population, Resources and Environment	Jia Zhibang
Committee of Education, Science, Culture, Health and Sports	Zhang Yutai
Committee for Social and Legal Affairs	Meng Xuenong
Committee for Ethnic and Religious Affairs	Zhu Weiqun
Committee for Liaison with Hong Kong, Macao, Taiwan and Overseas Chinese	Yang Chonghui; Sun Huaishan; Yang Yanyin
Committee of Foreign Affairs	Pan Yunhe
Committee on History and Study	Wang Taihua

== The first session ==
The 1st Session of the 12th CPPCC was held from March 3–12, 2013. It was announced on 2 March that the session period would be shortened to nine days, down from the ten days in the previous year. A preparatory meeting for the session was held on 2 March, presided by Jia Qinglin, the outgoing CPPCC chairman. The preparatory meeting approved the presidium of the session, the session's agenda and name list of the session's proposals examination committee. The presidium held a meeting later in the day, with Yu Zhengsheng presiding over the meeting assisted by several executive chairpersons.

The first plenary meeting of the 1st Session was held on 3 March, where Jia Qinglin delivered the work report of the Standing Committee of the 11th CPPCC National Committee. On 7 March, the second plenary meeting was held, where various members of the CPPCC gave speeches. On 8 March, the third plenary meeting was held.

The fourth plenary meeting was held on 11 March, during the meeting, Yu Zhengsheng was elected as the new chairman of the CPPCC, succeeding Jia Qinglin. Additionally, the vice chairpersons, the secretary-general and the members of the Standing Committee were elected. On 12 March, the 1st Session held its final meeting, where the work report were adopted. The session was presided by Wang Yang, who gave the closing address to the meeting.

Preceded by 11th CPPCC	National Committee of the Chinese People's Political Consultative Conference; 2013 - 2018	Succeeded by 13th CPPCC
