= 13th National Committee of the Chinese People's Political Consultative Conference =

13th National Committee of the Chinese People's Political Consultative Conference 中国人民政治协商会议第十三届全国委员会
- Emblem of the Chinese People's Political Consultative Conference

3 March 2018 – 4 March 2023 Overview
- Type: Advisory body

Leadership
- Chairman: Wang Yang
- Vice Chairmen: Zhang Qingli, Liu Qibao, Pagbalha Geleg Namgyai, Tung Chee-hwa, Wan Gang, Edmund Ho, Lu Zhangong, Wang Zhengwei, Ma Biao, Chen Xiaoguang, Leung Chun-ying, Xia Baolong, Yang Chuantang, Li Bin, Bagatur, Wang Yongqing, He Lifeng, Su Hui, Zheng Jianbang, Gu Shengzu, Liu Xincheng, He Wei, Gao Yunlong
- Secretary-General: Xia Baolong (until 14 March 2020); Li Bin (from 14 March 2020)
- Standing Committee: 300

Members
- Total: 2,158 members

The 13th National Committee of the Chinese People's Political Consultative Conference was the meeting of the top political advisory body of the People's Republic of China. It convened in Beijing on 3 March 2018 and ended on 4 March 2023.

== Seat distribution ==
As of May 2020, the 2163 members in the 13th National Committee of CPPCC was composed of:

Political parties: 544 seats People's organizations: 315 seats Sectoral representatives: 1010 seats Specially invited: 289 seats

=== Seats for political parties (543 in total) ===
Major party	General Secretary	Seats
Chinese Communist Party	Xi Jinping	104
Other Parties	Chairperson	Seats
Revolutionary Committee of the Chinese Kuomintang	Wan Exiang	65
China Democratic League	Ding Zhongli	65
China National Democratic Construction Association	Hao Mingjin	65
China Association for Promoting Democracy	Cai Dafeng	45
Chinese Peasants' and Workers' Democratic Party	Chen Zhu	43
China Zhi Gong Party	Wan Gang	29
Jiusan Society	Wu Weihua	45
Taiwan Democratic Self-Government League	Su Hui	20
Independents	N/A	62

=== Seats for people's organizations (306 in total) ===
People's organization	Seats
Communist Youth League of China	8
All-China Federation of Trade Unions	63
All-China Women's Federation	64
All-China Youth Federation	27
All-China Federation of Industry and Commerce	61
China Association for Science and Technology	42
All-China Federation of Taiwan Compatriots	14
All-China Federation of Returned Overseas Chinese	27

=== Seats for Sectoral representatives (1027 in total) ===
Sector	Seats
Literature and Arts	126
Science and Technology	116
Social Science	71
Economics	130
Agriculture	70
Education	106
Sports	19
Press and Publication	48
Medicine and Health	92
Friendship with Foreign Countries	46
Social Welfare and Social Security	34
Ethnic Minorities	104
Religions	65

=== Specially invited deputies (287 in total) ===
Hong Kong (124 in total)	Seats
Democratic Alliance for the Betterment and Progress of Hong Kong	25
Business and Professionals Alliance for Hong Kong	4
Hong Kong Federation of Trade Unions	2
Liberal Party	4
New Century Forum	1
New Territories Association of Societies	2
Independents	86
Macau (29 in total)	Seats
Macau United Citizens Association	1
Macau Business Interest Union	1
Macau Union of Professional Interests	2
Progress Promotion Union/General Union of the Macao Residents' Associations	1
Union for Development/The Women's General Association of Macau	1
Independents	23
Other	Seats
Other (including People's Liberation Army and the People's Armed Police service personnel)	134

== Organization ==
=== Council of Chairpersons ===
		Party	Term
Chairman	Wang Yang	CCP	14 Mar. 2018 – 10 Mar. 2023
Vice Chairpersons	Zhang Qingli	CCP	14 Mar. 2018 – 10 Mar. 2023
Vice Chairpersons	Liu Qibao	CCP	14 Mar. 2018 – 10 Mar. 2023
Vice Chairpersons	Pagbalha Geleg Namgyai	Ind.	14 Mar. 2018 – 10 Mar. 2023
Vice Chairpersons	Tung Chee-hwa	Ind.	14 Mar. 2018 – 10 Mar. 2023
Vice Chairpersons	Wan Gang	CZGP	14 Mar. 2018 – 10 Mar. 2023
Vice Chairpersons	Edmund Ho	Ind.	14 Mar. 2018 – 10 Mar. 2023
Vice Chairpersons	Lu Zhangong	CCP	14 Mar. 2018 – 10 Mar. 2023
Vice Chairpersons	Wang Zhengwei	CCP	14 Mar. 2018 – 10 Mar. 2023
Vice Chairpersons	Ma Biao	CCP	14 Mar. 2018 – 10 Mar. 2023
Vice Chairpersons	Chen Xiaoguang	CDL	14 Mar. 2018 – 10 Mar. 2023
Vice Chairpersons	Leung Chun-ying	Ind.	14 Mar. 2018 – 10 Mar. 2023
Vice Chairpersons	Xia Baolong	CCP	14 Mar. 2018 – 10 Mar. 2023
Vice Chairpersons	Yang Chuantang	CCP	14 Mar. 2018 – 10 Mar. 2023
Vice Chairpersons	Li Bin	CCP	14 Mar. 2018 – 10 Mar. 2023
Vice Chairpersons	Bagatur	CCP	14 Mar. 2018 – 10 Mar. 2023
Vice Chairpersons	Wang Yongqing	CCP	14 Mar. 2018 – 10 Mar. 2023
Vice Chairpersons	He Lifeng	CCP	14 Mar. 2018 – 10 Mar. 2023
Vice Chairpersons	Su Hui	TDSL	14 Mar. 2018 – 10 Mar. 2023
Vice Chairpersons	Zheng Jianbang	RCCK	14 Mar. 2018 – 10 Mar. 2023
Vice Chairpersons	Gu Shengzu	CNDCA	14 Mar. 2018 – 10 Mar. 2023
Vice Chairpersons	Liu Xincheng	CDL	14 Mar. 2018 – 10 Mar. 2023
Vice Chairpersons	He Wei	CPWDP	14 Mar. 2018 – 10 Mar. 2023
Vice Chairpersons	Gao Yunlong	CNDCA	14 Mar. 2018 – 10 Mar. 2023
Secretary-General	Xia Baolong	CCP	14 Mar. 2018 – 27 May 2020
Secretary-General	Li Bin	CCP	27 May 2020 – 10. Mar. 2023

=== Special Committees ===
Special committee	Chairperson
Committee for Handling Proposals	Li Zhiyong
Committee for Economic Affairs	Shang Fulin
Committee for Agriculture and Rural Affairs	Luo Zhijun
Committee of Population, Resources and Environment	Li Wei
Committee of Education, Science, Culture, Health and Sports	Yuan Guiren
Committee for Social and Legal Affairs	Shen Deyong
Committee for Ethnic and Religious Affairs	Wang Weiguang
Committee for Liaison with Hong Kong, Macao, Taiwan and Overseas Chinese	Zhu Xiaodan
Committee of Foreign Affairs	Lou Jiwei
Committee on Culture, History and Study	Song Dahan

== The first session ==
The 1st Session of the 13th CPPCC was held from March 3–15, 2018. A preparatory meeting for the session was held on 2 March, presided by Yu Zhengsheng, the outgoing CPPCC chairman. The preparatory meeting approved the presidium of the session, the session's agenda and name list of the session's proposals examination committee. The presidium held a meeting later in the day, with Wang Yang presiding over the meeting assisted by several executive chairpersons.

The first plenary meeting of the 1st Session was held on 3 March, where Yu Zhengsheng delivered the work report of the Standing Committee of the 12th CPPCC National Committee. On 8 March, the second plenary meeting was held, where various members of the CPPCC gave speeches. On 11 March, the third plenary meeting was held.

The fourth plenary meeting was held on 14 March, during the meeting, Wang Yang was elected as the new chairman of the CPPCC, succeeding Yu Zhengsheng. Additionally, the vice chairpersons, the secretary-general and the members of the Standing Committee were elected. On 15 March, the 1st Session held its final meeting, where the work report were adopted. The session was presided by Wang Yang, who gave the closing address to the meeting.

Wang Yang opening the third session of the 13th CPPCC in May 2020.

Preceded by 12th CPPCC	National Committee of the Chinese People's Political Consultative Conference; 2018 - 2023	Succeeded by 14th CPPCC
