= Yu Zhengsheng =

Chinese politician (born 1945)

- 俞正声
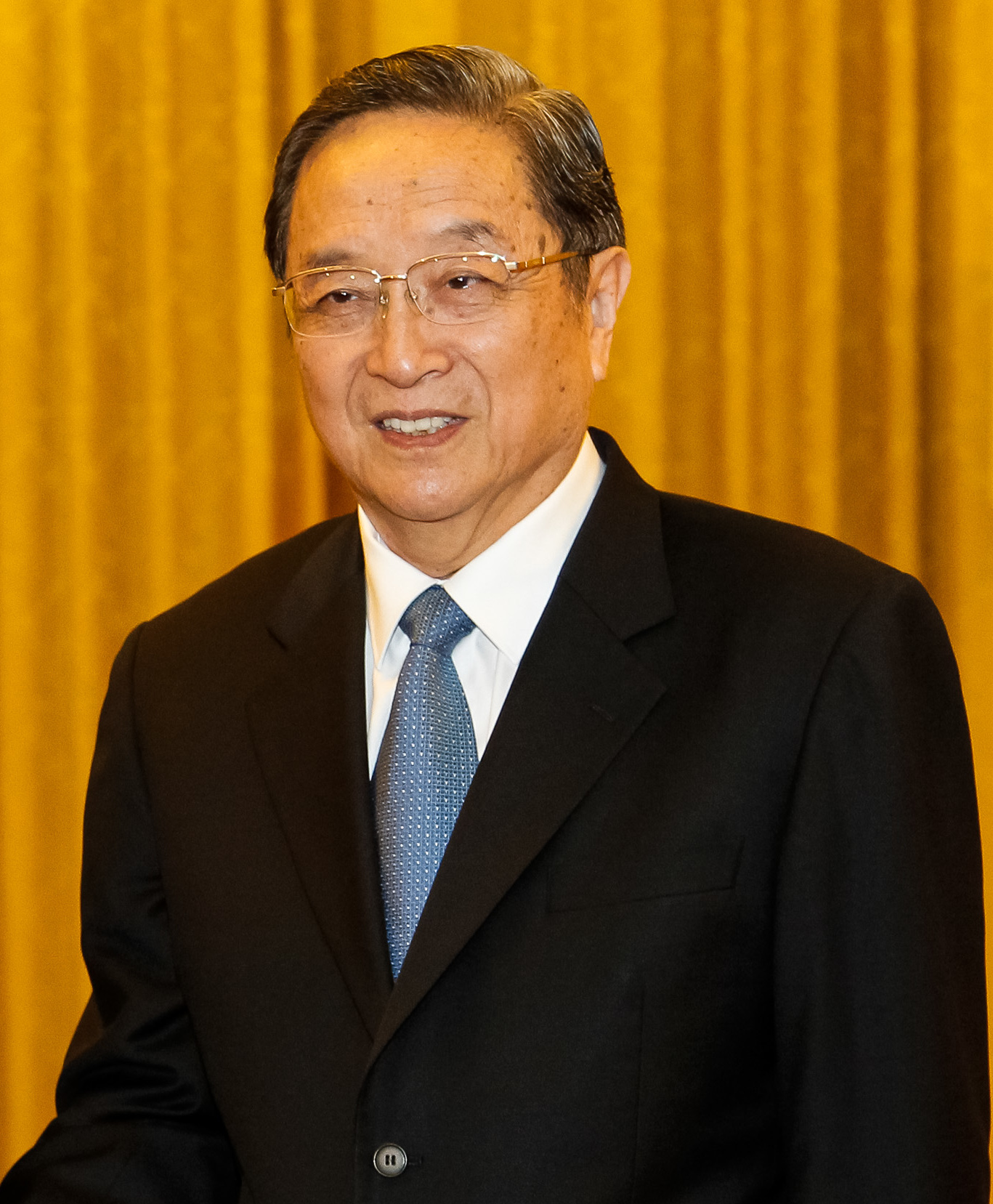
- Yu in 2017

8th Chairman of the National Committee of the Chinese People's Political Consultative Conference
- In office 11 March 2013 – 14 March 2018
- Vice Chairpersons: See list: Du Qinglin; Ling Jihua; Han Qide; Pagbalha Geleg Namgyai; Tung Chee-hwa; Wan Gang; Lin Wenyi; Luo Fuhe; Edmund Ho; Zhang Qingli; Li Haifeng; Su Rong; Chen Yuan; Lu Zhangong; Zhou Xiaochuan; Wang Jiarui; Wang Zhengwei; Ma Biao; Qi Xuchun; Chen Xiaoguang; Ma Peihua; Liu Xiaofeng; Wang Qinmin; Leung Chun-ying
- Secretary-General: Zhang Qingli
- Preceded by: Jia Qinglin
- Succeeded by: Wang Yang

Party Secretary of Shanghai
- In office 27 October 2007 – 20 November 2012
- Mayor: Han Zheng
- Preceded by: Xi Jinping
- Succeeded by: Han Zheng

Party Secretary of Hubei
- In office 7 December 2001 – 27 October 2007
- Governor: Zhang Guoguang; Luo Qingquan
- Preceded by: Jiang Zhuping
- Succeeded by: Luo Qingquan

Minister for Construction
- In office 18 March 1998 – 29 December 2001
- Premier: Zhu Rongji
- Preceded by: Hou Jie
- Succeeded by: Wang Guangtao

Personal details
- Born: 5 April 1945 (age 81) Yan'an, Shaanxi
- Party: Chinese Communist Party
- Spouse: Zhang Zhikai
- Children: 1
- Parent(s): Huang Jing; Fan Jin
- Relatives: Yu Qiangsheng (brother)
- Education: Harbin Military Engineering Institute
- Website: www.gov.cn

Yu Zhengsheng
- Simplified Chinese: 俞正声
- Traditional Chinese: 俞正聲
Transcriptions
Standard Mandarin
- Hanyu Pinyin: Yú Zhèngshēng

Yu Zhengsheng (/juː dʒʌŋˈʃʌŋ/; Chinese: 俞正声; born 5 April 1945) is a retired Chinese politician who served as the Chairman of the National Committee of the Chinese People's Political Consultative Conference (CPPCC) from March 2013 to 2018. Between 2012 and 2017, Yu was the fourth-ranking member of the Politburo Standing Committee of the Chinese Communist Party.

Prior to coming to prominence nationally, Yu served as the Party Secretary of Hubei, and Party Secretary of Shanghai, one of China's most important regional offices. Yu became a member of the Politburo of the Chinese Communist Party in November 2002.

== Early life and education ==
Yu Zhengsheng was born in the communist revolutionary heartland of Yan'an in 1945, the son of Yu Qiwei (better known as Huang Jing), a Communist revolutionary, and Fan Jin, a frontline journalist. Yu's family was originally from Shaoxing, Zhejiang province. He graduated from Harbin Military Academy of Engineering specializing in the design of automated missiles. In December 1968 he was sent to work in Zhangjiakou, Hebei. Until the mid-1980s his career concentration was in electronic engineering. In 1984, he was asked by Deng Xiaoping's son Deng Pufang to take on a leading role in the Fund for Disabled Persons.

== Political career ==
In 1985, Yu was sent to Shandong to become Deputy Party Secretary of Yantai in Shandong province. In 1987 he was named mayor of Yantai at age 42. In 1992, he was named party chief of Qingdao and a member of the Shandong provincial Party Standing Committee; he was known to have released his salary income, housing situation, and gifts he received on television.

He failed to secure election to the Central Committee in 1992, subsequently being sent to become Party chief in Qingdao. Qingdao was approved as a sub-provincial city in 1997. Yu served as Deputy Minister of Construction when he was recalled to Beijing in 1997, and a year later promoted to the Minister position. He remained in that position in Zhu Rongji's cabinet from 1998 to 2001. He became a member of the powerful Politburo of the Chinese Communist Party in November 2002, while serving as the party chief of Hubei. Yu was the only Hubei party chief since economic reforms began to hold a seat on the Politburo.

=== Shanghai (2007–2012) ===
Following the 17th Party Congress, Yu became the party chief in Shanghai, replacing Xi Jinping. During his term as party chief, Shanghai experienced below-normal economic growth and a drastic increase in real estate prices; a large influx of migrants from outside the city migrated in search of work, creating tension with locals. In five urban districts of Shanghai, the population of those with outside hukou exceeded that of long-term Shanghai residents. In addition, the major fire of 15 November 2010 of a 28-storey high-rise apartment also led to some residents citing mismanagement on the part of Yu. As a result, Yu has earned a bad reputation from Shanghai residents compared to his predecessors.

=== Standing Committee (2012–2017) ===
Prior to the 18th Party Congress, Yu was seen as a leading candidate for the Politburo Standing Committee. It was customary for Shanghai party chiefs to enter the Standing Committee after the end of their terms since Jiang Zemin ascended to the Standing Committee in 1989 (the only exception was Chen Liangyu, who was ousted on corruption charges). It was said that Yu edged out Li Yuanchao for membership on the leadership council at the eleventh hour due to internal voting and consultations. Yu ranked fourth on the Standing Committee. On 11 March 2013, at the first session of the 12th National Committee of the Chinese People's Political Consultative Conference, Yu was elected as the CPPCC chairman. This gave him portfolio of managing Xinjiang and Tibet affairs.

Yu retired from Politburo Standing Committee after 19th Party Congress in October 2017 at age of 72, and stepped down as Chairman of the Chinese People's Political Consultative Conference on 14 March 2018, being succeeded by Wang Yang.

== Personal life ==
Yu is married to Zhang Zhikai (Chinese: 张志凯; pinyin: Zhāng Zhìkǎi), the daughter of Zhang Zhenhuan. They have a son. Yu was said to be friends with former leader Deng Xiaoping and his family, including Deng Xiaoping's son Deng Pufang. After the senior Deng left politics, Yu was said to have served as his family's proxy within the Chinese government. He is known to speak without relying on script, and is often called "Lao Yu" by people familiar with him.

=== Brother's defection ===
Yu's brother, Yu Qiangsheng, defected to the United States in 1985. After defecting, Qiangsheng informed the U.S. government that Larry Wu-tai Chin, a retired CIA analyst, was actually a spy for the Chinese government.

Political offices
Preceded by Jia Qinglin	Chairman of the National Committee of the Chinese People's Political Consultative Conference; 2013–2018	Succeeded by Wang Yang
Government offices
Preceded by Hou Jie	Minister of Housing and Urban–Rural Development; 1998–2001	Succeeded by Wang Guangtao
Party political offices
Preceded by Jiang Zhuping	Party Secretary of Hubei; 2001–2007	Succeeded by Luo Qingquan
Preceded by Xi Jinping	Party Secretary of Shanghai; 2007–2012	Succeeded by Han Zheng
Order of precedence
Preceded by Zhang Dejiang	4th Rank of the Chinese Communist Party; 18th Politburo Standing Committee	Succeeded by Liu Yunshan
