= Liu Fei =

Liu Fei may refer to:

- Liu Fei, Prince of Qi (Chinese: 劉肥) (died c. 190 BCE)
- Liu Fei, Prince of Jiangdu (Chinese: 劉非) (168– c. 128 BCE)
- Liu Fei (politician) (Chinese: 刘斐) (1898–1983), Chinese politician and general
- Liu Fei (general) (Chinese: 刘飞) (1905–1984), People's Liberation Army lieutenant general
- Liu Fei (artist) (Chinese: 刘非) (born 1964), Chinese contemporary artist
- Liu Fei (table tennis) (born 1995), Chinese table tennis player
