= Wang Shizhen =

Wang Shizhen is the name of:

- Wang Shizhen (Tang dynasty) (759–809), Tang dynasty warlord, de facto ruler of Chengde
- Wang Shizhen (Ming dynasty) (1526–1590), Ming dynasty poet, writer, and artist
- Wang Shizhen (Beiyang government) (1861–1930), general and minister of the Beiyang government of Republic of China
- Wang Shizhen (physician) (1916–2016), founder of Chinese nuclear medicine

== See also ==
- Wang Zhizhen
