= Gao Yunlong =

Chinese politician

- 高云龙
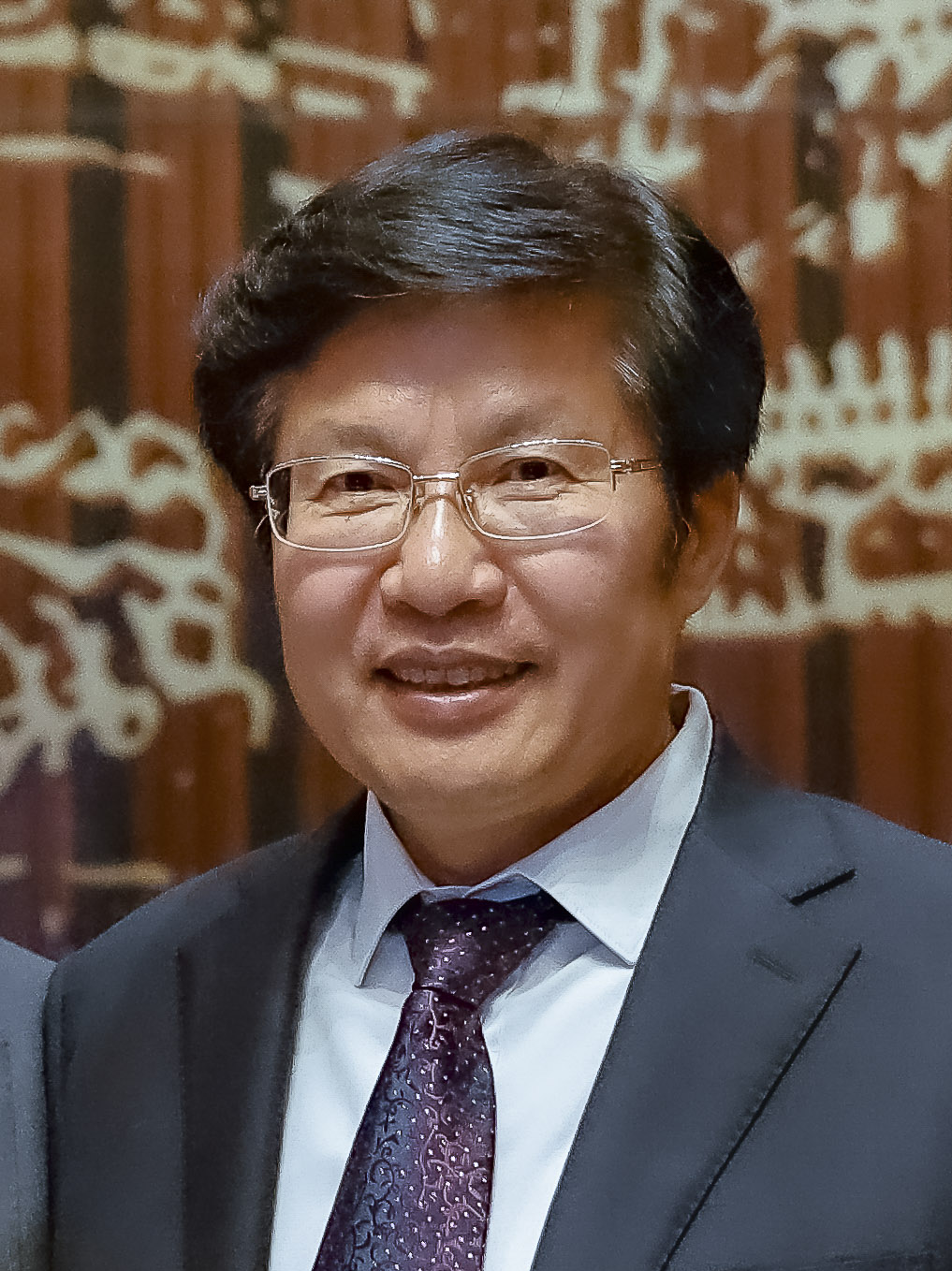
- Gao Yunlong in May 2025

Vice Chairman of the Chinese People's Political Consultative Conference
- Incumbent
- Assumed office 14 March 2018
- Chairman: Wang Yang; Wang Huning

Chairman of the All-China Federation of Industry and Commerce
- Incumbent
- Assumed office November 2017
- Preceded by: Wang Qinmin

Chairman of the Qinghai Committee of the China National Democratic Construction Association
- In office November 2008 – December 2014
- Chairman: Chen Changzhi
- Preceded by: Ma Peihua
- Succeeded by: Wang Jian

Chairman of the Guangxi Committee of the China National Democratic Construction Association
- In office May 2007 – November 2008
- Chairman: Chen Changzhi
- Preceded by: Lu Hushan
- Succeeded by: Qian Xueming

Personal details
- Born: December 1958 (age 67) Laiwu, Shandong, China
- Party: China National Democratic Construction Association
- Education: East China University of Science and Technology; Tsinghua University

Gao Yunlong (Chinese: 高云龙, born December 1958) is a Chinese politician, who is currently a vice chairperson of the Chinese People's Political Consultative Conference.
