= Liu Xiaofeng =

Liu Xiaofeng may refer to:

- Liu Xiaofeng (politician) (born 1947) (Chinese: 刘晓峰), Chinese politician
- Liu Xiaofeng (academic) (born 1956), scholar in Christianity and political theory
- Liu Xiaofeng (footballer) (born 1985), Changsha Ginde football player
