= Zhang Chong =

Zhang Chong (Chinese: 张冲) may refer to:

- Zhang Chong (politician) (1900 – 1980), Chinese politician
- Zhang Chong (footballer) (born 1987), Chinese footballer
- Zhang Chong (film director) (born 1987), Chinese film director
