= Li Keqiang index =

Economic measurement index for China

Li Keqiang index or Keqiang index (Chinese: 克强指数) is an economic measurement index created by The Economist in 2010 to measure China's economy using three indicators, as reportedly preferred by Li Keqiang, formerly the premier of China, as a better economic indicator than official numbers of GDP.

According to a leaked State Department memo, Li Keqiang (then the Chinese Communist Party Committee Secretary of Liaoning province) told visiting US ambassador Clark Randt in 2007 that the GDP figures in Liaoning were unreliable and that he himself used three other indicators: the railway cargo volume, electricity consumption and loans disbursed by banks.

The "Keqiang index" is also used by Haitong Securities released in 2013, suggesting decelerating China's economic growth since the beginning of 2013.

According to The Economist, the reliability of the index was undermined during the COVID-19 pandemic as it did not account for the decline in retail sales, air travel and the property market.

== See also ==
- Economy of China
- Li Keqiang Government
- Big Mac Index, another index by The Economist
