= Li Meng =

Li Meng may refer to:

- Li Meng (politician) (Chinese: 李蒙), Chinese politician
- Li Meng (basketball) (born 1995) (Chinese: 李梦), Chinese basketball player
