= Huang Mengfu =

Chinese politician

Huang Mengfu 黄孟复
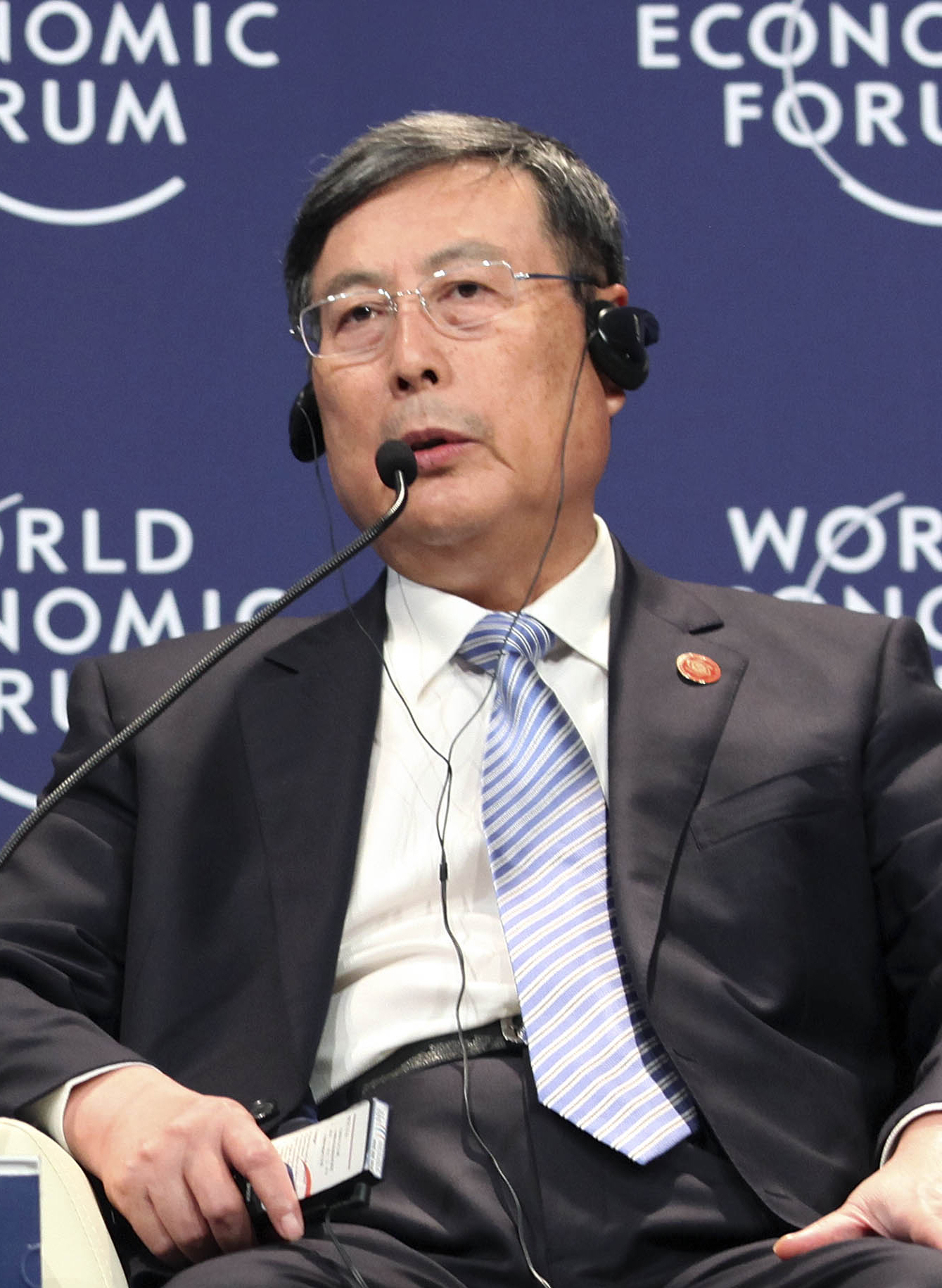
- Huang Mengfu at the World Economic Forum Annual Meeting of the New Champions in Tianjin, China 2012

Vice Chairman of the Chinese People's Political Consultative Conference
- In office 13 March 2003 – 11 March 2013
- Chairman: Jia Qinglin

Personal details
- Born: January 1944 (age 82) Chongqing
- Party: China Democratic National Construction Association (CDNCA)

Huang Mengfu (simplified Chinese: 黄孟复; traditional Chinese: 黃孟復; pinyin: Huáng Mèngfù) is a vice chairman of the China People's Political Consultative Conference and chairman of the All-China Federation of Industry and Commerce. He ranks as a national leader of China.

Huang Mengfu is a grandson of former Chinese vice premier Huang Yanpei (Chinese: 黄炎培, 1878–1965) who is regarded as the founder of modern vocational education in China. Huang Mengfu was born in Chongqing in January 1944 and grew up in Shanghai and Beijing in his grandfather's household. He is a metallurgical engineer and a 1968 graduate of the Beijing Steel and Iron Institute. From 1968 to 1992, he made a career from a normal steel worker to vice director of the Nanjing Iron and Steel Works in Jiangsu. He was appointed vice mayor of Nanjing in 1992 and vice chairman of the Jiangsu People's Congress Standing Committee in 1998. In 2001, he was appointed vice chairman of the All-China Federation of Industry and Commerce, and was appointed chairman of ACFIC in November 2002, replacing Jing Shuping who retired. As a result of his position, he was also appointed vice chairman of the CPPCC in March 2003. He was confirmed for a second five-year term in both positions in November 2007 and March 2008.

Huang is also honorary vice chairman of the Red Cross of China, honorary chairman of the China Employment Promotion Association, and holds leading and honorary positions in a number of other business and philanthropic organizations of China.
