= Cai Xiao =

Taiwan-born Chinese military officer and politician

- 蔡啸

Chairperson of the Taiwan Democratic Self-Government League
- In office 1979–1983
- Preceded by: Xie Xuehong
- Succeeded by: Su Ziheng

Personal details
- Born: October 1919 Tainan, Japanese Taiwan
- Died: 11 January 1990 (aged 70) China
- Party: Taiwan Democratic Self-Government League (since 1978); Chinese Communist Party (since 1939)
- Children: Su Hui
- Awards: Order of Independence and Freedom, 2nd class Order of Liberation, 2nd class

Military service
- Allegiance: Chinese Red Army; People's Liberation Army
- Years of service: 1937–?
- Rank: Senior colonel

Cai Xiao (simplified Chinese: 蔡啸; traditional Chinese: 蔡嘯; Wade–Giles: Ts'ai Hsiao; October 1919 – 11 January 1990) was a Chinese military officer and politician from Taiwan. He was involved in training the Third Field Army for deployment to Taiwan in 1949 and 1950. He served on the Central Committee of the Chinese Communist Party and became chairman of the Taiwan Democratic Self-Government League.

== Career ==
Born in Japanese Taiwan, Cai moved to China and joined the New Fourth Army in 1937. Two years later, he became a formal member of the Chinese Communist Party. In May 1946, the CCP established the Taiwan Provincial Work Committee. Cai Xiao worked under the commission's secretary-general Cai Xiaoqian, training others in political warfare. In November 1949, Cai established the Taiwan Cadre Training Regiment under the 9th Corps of the People's Liberation Army's (PLA) Third Field Army for deployment to Taiwan.

Cai was jailed for nine years in the midst of the Cultural Revolution. Upon his political rehabilitation, Cai worked for the PLA General Political Department and General Logistics Department, becoming the GPD's deputy director in 1975. From 1973 to 1982, he served on the Central Committee of the Chinese Communist Party. After retiring from the military, Cai succeeded Xie Xuehong as chairman of the Taiwan Democratic Self-Government League (Taimeng), serving from 1979 to 1983.

In December 2017, Cai Xiao's daughter Su Hui was elected chair of Taimeng.

Party political offices
Previous: Xie Xuehong	Chair of the Taiwan Democratic Self-Government League; 1979—1983	Next: Su Zeheng
