= Luo Qingquan =

Chinese politician (1945–2021)

Luo Qingquan in 2010

Luo Qingquan (simplified Chinese: 罗清泉; traditional Chinese: 羅清泉; pinyin: Luó Qīngquán; 9 November 1945 – 23 April 2021) was a politician of the People's Republic of China and the former Governor and Communist Party Chief of Hubei province.

Born in Jiangling, Hubei, Luo started working in 1968, and joined the CPC in 1975. He formerly served as the vice secretary of the CPC Yichang municipal committee, as well as vice mayor and later, mayor and Party chief of Yichang. He has also been the vice secretary of the CPC Hubei committee, secretary of the commission for discipline inspection of Hubei, and the secretary of the CPC Wuhan municipal committee. In October 2002, Luo was appointed vice governor and acting governor of Hubei. He was confirmed in January 2003 as governor. In October 2007, Luo succeeded Yu Zhengsheng as the CPC Party chief of Hubei Province.

Luo was a member of the 15th Central Commission for Discipline Inspection. He was also a member of the 16th and the 17th Central Committee of the Chinese Communist Party.

Party political offices
Preceded by Yu Zhengsheng	Party Secretary of Hubei; 2007–2011	Succeeded by Li Hongzhong
Government offices
Preceded by Zhang Guoguang	Governor of Hubei; 2003–2007	Succeeded by Li Hongzhong
