= Sun Fuling =

Chinese politician (1921–2018)

Sun Fuling (Chinese: 孙孚凌; September 1921 – 18 May 2018) was a Chinese business executive and politician. He was General Manager of Fuxing Flour Mill, one of the largest Chinese-owned factories in Beijing, on the eve of the city's takeover by the Communist forces during the Chinese Civil War. He was subsequently appointed the first director and general manager of the nationalized Beijing General Flour Mill before entering politics. He served as deputy mayor of Beijing from 1983 to 1993 and Vice Chairman of the Chinese People's Political Consultative Conference from 1993 to 2003. He was a member of the China Democratic National Construction Association (Minjian).

== Early life and education ==
Sun was born in September 1921 in Heihe, Heilongjiang Province, but was a considered a native of his ancestral home Shaoxing, Zhejiang, by Chinese convention.

From 1938 to 1940, he studied in the Department of Physics, Yenching University and the Department of Mathematics, Southwest Union University. From 1941 to 1945, he studied at the Political Economics Department of Guanghua University (then exiled in Chengdu during World War II) and the Economics Department of West China Union University, from which he graduated in 1945.

== Business career ==
Sun was deeply influenced by his paternal uncle, the famous entrepreneur Sun Yueqi, who believed in saving China through industry. In December 1948, during the Chinese Civil War, he was appointed general manager of Fuxing Flour Mill (福兴面粉厂), then one of the largest Chinese-owned factories in Beijing, just before the city was taken by the Communist Party's People's Liberation Army. He made major donations to the People's Volunteer Army during the Korean War, and cooperated with the new Communist government in its campaign to nationalize China's private businesses. When 11 private-owned flour mills were partially nationalized and reorganized into the Beijing General Flour Mill, Sun was appointed its first director and general manager.

== Political career ==
From 1958 to 1983, Sun served as director of the Beijing Municipal Bureau of Service Management, deputy director of the Municipal Foreign Trade Bureau, chairman of the Beijing Federation of Industry and Commerce, deputy chairman of Minjian Beijing Committee, and deputy chairman of the Beijing CPPCC.

From 1983 to 1993, he served as deputy mayor of Beijing, and vice chairman and executive vice chairman of All China Federation of Industry and Commerce. In March 1993, he was elected Vice Chairman of the Eighth National Committee of the Chinese People's Political Consultative Conference (CPPCC). In March 1998, he was re-elected as the vice chairman of the Ninth CPPCC National Committee, serving until 2003. He was also a member of the 2nd to 5th CPPCC National Committee and the 6th and 7th CPPCC Standing Committee.

== Death ==
On 18 May 2018, Sun died in Beijing at the age of 96. His body was cremated on 24 May and his ashes buried at the Babaoshan Revolutionary Cemetery. Before the cremation, Chinese Communist Party general secretary Xi Jinping, Premier Li Keqiang, and all other members of the Party Politburo Standing Committee paid their final respects at the cemetery.
