= Zhang Kehui =

Chinese politician (1928–2024)

- 张克辉

Vice Chairman of the Chinese People's Political Consultative Conference
- In office 13 March 1998 – 13 March 2008
- Chairman: Li Ruihuan; Jia Qinglin

Chairman of the Taiwan Democratic Self-Government League
- In office 1997 – December 2005
- Preceded by: Cai Zimin
- Succeeded by: Lin Wenyi

Personal details
- Born: Zhang Youyi (張有義); February 1928 Shōka City, Taichū Prefecture, Japanese Taiwan (now Changhua County, Taiwan)
- Died: 11 January 2024 (aged 95)
- Party: Taiwan Democratic Self-Government League; Chinese Communist Party (since 1948)
- Education: Taiwan Provincial College; Amoy University

Zhang Kehui (Chinese: 张克辉; pinyin: Zhāng Kèhuī, February 1928 – 11 January 2024) was a Chinese politician.

== Biography ==
He was born in Shōka, Japanese Taiwan. From 1942 to 1948 he studied at Changhua Senior School of Commerce and Taiwan Normal College. In 1948 Zhang entered department of economics, Xiamen University. One year later, he became a People's Liberation Army company commander. From 1952 to 1969, he served as a manager of the United Front Work Department of the Fujian Provincial Committee of the Chinese Communist Party. From 1969 he was sent to Ninghua County for manual labour for 4 years.

From 1982 to 1991 Zhang served as the minister of United Front Department, Fujian province. From 1991 to 1997 he was the vice-chairman of Taiwan Democratic Self-Government League, and in 1997 the chairman of the league till 2005. He was also the President of All-China Federation of Taiwan Compatriots from 1991 to 1997, and Vice Chairman of the Chinese People's Political Consultative Conference from 1998 to 2008.

Zhang died on 11 January 2024, at the age of 95.

Party political offices
Previous: Cai Zemin	Chair of the Taiwan Democratic Self-Government League; 1997–2005	Next: Lin Wenyi
