= Yu Qiangsheng =

Chinese intelligence officer who defected to the US (1940–2013)

- 俞强声
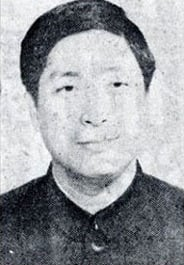
- Yu circa 1960
- Born: 1940; Yan'an, Shaanxi, Republic of China
- Died: 2013 (aged 72–73)
- Citizenship: People's Republic of China; United States (from 1986)
- Education: University of International Relations
- Employers: Ministry of Public Security; Ministry of State Security
- Political party: Chinese Communist Party (–1986)
- Parents: Fan Jin (mother); Huang Jing (father)
- Family: Yu Zhengsheng (brother); Zeng Zhaolun (great uncle); Yu Dawei (great uncle); Zhang Aiping (uncle-in-law)
- Espionage activity
- Allegiance: United States (from 1980)
- Agency: Central Intelligence Agency
- Service years: 1980–1986
- Cryptonym: PLANESMAN
- Operations: JADE POWDER

Yu Qiangsheng (Chinese: 俞强声; 1940 – 2013) was a former high-ranking Chinese intelligence officer who defected to the United States in 1985. Born into an elite princeling family, Yu ascended the ranks of China's Ministry of State Security (MSS), rising to lead the agency's North American operations. By that time, Yu had become a double agent, passing information to the U.S. Central Intelligence Agency (CIA) under the codename PLANESMAN. Described by his former FBI handler as "the ultimate risk taker", Yu was exfiltrated from China by way of Hong Kong in 1986 in operation JADE POWDER. The disclosures he made in his debriefing exposed CIA officer Larry Wu-Tai Chin as having been a mole for China for more than 40 years. Following his debriefing, Yu lived out the remainder of his life in the United States as a consultant for the intelligence services of the Five Eyes. He died in 2013.

== Early life and family ==
Yu was born to father Huang Jing (黄敬) and his second wife, Fan Jin. Yu's mother was a journalist who later became vice mayor of Beijing and president of Beijing Daily. His father, born Yu Qiwei (俞启威), was born in 1912 to a prominent family in Shaoxing, Zhejiang Province. Yu Qiwei first married fellow schoolmate Li Yunhe from National Qingdao University (now Shandong University), and introduced Li to the communist movement. They later divorced, and after the Marco Polo Bridge incident, Li fled to the Yun'an district of Guangdong Province where she first dated mutual friend and CCP spymaster Kang Sheng, and later, Mao Zedong, whom she married to become Jiang Qing, the inaugural first lady of the People's Republic of China and leader of the radical political alliance known as the Gang of Four. Huang remained friends with Kang Sheng, and went on to marry Fan Jin, Yu Qiangsheng's mother.

Yu had four siblings including his younger brother Yu Zhengsheng, now a retired senior Chinese politician whose career included assignments as the Communist Party Secretary of Hubei Province and Shanghai, and 8th Chairman of the Chinese People's Political Consultive Conference. The survival of the younger Yu's political career following the defection is attributed to either the influence of Zhang Aiping, his father-in-law, who at the time was Minister National of Defense, or his friendship with Deng Pufang, the eldest son of Deng Xiaoping, who used a wheelchair after being thrown out of a window by Red Guards during the Cultural Revolution.

== Police career ==
Yu's career in Chinese intelligence is believed to owe much to his father's dying request to his friend, CCP spymaster Kang Sheng, that he make then-18-year-old Yu his adoptive son. Soon after, Yu began studying at the University of International Relations, the foreign affairs school in Beijing run by Chinese intelligence.

After graduating in the mid-1960s amidst the Cultural Revolution, Yu found a position within Ministry of Public Security as a civilian policeman at the Beijing Municipal Public Security Bureau. Soon after, like many cadres of the era, he was sent down to the countryside. Upon his return, he became the leader of a task force enforcing the One Strike and Three Anti's Campaign, which targeted people said to exhibit the 'counter-revolutionary' behaviors of 'graft and embezzlement', 'profiteering' and 'extravagance and waste.' The task force was notable for arresting artist and writer Zhang Langlang (張郎郎), who was sentenced to death for criticizing the government, and accused of being a French spy.

== Intelligence career ==
In 1974, Yu joined the Waishiju, the counterintelligence branch within the Foreign Affairs Bureau of the MPS. Despite not having participated in violent abuses that were trademarks of then-MPS spy chief Kang Sheng, Yu quickly rose through the ranks of the agency, moving to the fledgling Ministry of State Security soon after it split from the MPS in 1983.

Within the MSS, Yu reportedly served briefly as head of the counterintelligence-focused Beijing Municipal State Security Bureau, before becoming head of the agency's North America Bureau, which leads operations against the United States and Canada.

=== Defection ===
As a member of the MPS sent down to the countryside during the Cultural Revolution, Yu was unable to protect his mother from degradation at the hands of Red Guards. Having failed to prevent her humiliation, Yu reportedly became increasingly resentful of her treatment until he finally decided to contact the CIA.

In 1980, Larry Wu-tai Chin told his handlers about the arrival of a new undercover CIA officer assigned to the U.S. Embassy in Beijing. As chief of counterintelligence within the North America Department of the MSS, Yu was sent to try to recruit the new arrival, but instead opted to use the imprimatur of the officially sanctioned contact with a member of the CIA to defect to the United States himself. The intelligence he passed to the Americans enabled the CIA to identify Chinese moles within US intelligence, including Chin. In the words of Roger Faligot, "thanks to Yu's perfidy, Larry had signed his own death certificate when he faithfully reported to his Chinese paylords that a new US agent was in town."

According to a testimony before the U.S.–China Economic and Security Review Commission, Yu was the first to provide the United States Intelligence Community with an understanding of PRC intelligence operations.

In early 1982, Yu provided specific information regarding a Chinese mole: On February 6, 1982, the spy would arrive in Beijing on a Pan Am flight, stay in Room 553 of the Qianmen Hotel in Beijing, and call Zhu Entao, deputy director of the Foreign Affairs Bureau of the MPS, after which the spy will be appointed as a deputy bureau-level official. On February 27, the spy would return to the United States. The CIA decided then that the counterintelligence threat needed to be turned over to the FBI.

In September 1982, I.C. Smith, head of the China Counterintelligence Team of the FBI, received a message from the CIA that said the U.S. Intelligence Community had been penetrated by a longstanding Chinese mole. That's basically all it said. Didn't reveal the person's ethnicity, gender, nothing." Smith gave the source the codename PLANESMAN, a term for the person who operates the diving plane, a control surface which determines the elevation and depth of a submarine.

According to I.C. Smith:

"PLANESMAN was not just an ordinary Chinese citizen employed by the MSS. He was one of China's "golden youth", the offspring of China's political elite. I became convinced that the "golden youth" were in a better position to see the hypocrisy of the Communist system under which they lived ... I believe PLANESMAN saw this hypocrisy and at some point decided to hit back in his own way. His actions were simply audacious. He strolled around MSS headquarters, routinely photographing documents on desks, pulling files, and making inquiries, and being the son of those with influence, he benefited from special treatment. He even pilfered the desk of his supervisor, whom he referred to as the "Beijing Bitch", where he was able to gain access to the most secret of the information contained within the [MSS]. ... PLANESMAN in the flesh was a gregarious, animated individual who spoke in fractured English, but who seemed to have a very real zest for life. When we met at last after Operation Eagle Claw was over, he confirmed my long-held suspicion that he was the ultimate risk taker. I had the impression he would have paid the CIA to allow him to be their spy."

=== Escape ===
In October 1985, Yu fled China for the United States via Kai Tak Airport in British Hong Kong. At the time, he was purportedly on a visit to see his French girlfriend, a U.S. State Department employee.

=== Impact ===
Yu provided a number of state secrets to the Central Intelligence Agency, most famously revealing China's top spy in Washington, former analyst at the CIA, Larry Wu-Tai Chin, and French diplomat Bernard Bouriscot, who had been recruited by Chinese intelligence using a honeypot.

In China, Yu's defection prompted a reorganization of the MSS and the sacking of the inaugural director of the MSS, Ling Yun. When his successor, Jia Chunwang was asked to comment on the defection of Yu, Jia only responded, "It's very regrettable." It led to even greater restrictions on overseas MSS operations at a time when Deng Xiaoping, already wary of stirring controversy as China started reform and opening up, had grown fond of using People's Liberation Army military attaché's as the primary intelligence resident of China's overseas embassies.

=== Declassification ===
On 1 September 1986, the news of Yu Qiangsheng's escape to the United States was exclusively reported by Agence France-Presse, and was subsequently reported by the Los Angeles Times and other American media as well as Hong Kong media.

== Later life and death ==
Details of Yu's life after leaving China remain sparse, though scattered reports over the years eventually produced a rudimentary story of his later life: He was exfiltrated to the United States in an operation code-named JADE POWDER and placed in a resettlement program. He went on to serve as a consultant to the members of the Five Eyes. Journalist Roger Faligot reported that he spent time in a safe house near San Francisco and maintained contact with cousins in Taiwan. Throughout the 1990s, the Chinese government spread apocryphal rumors of Yu's assassination. State media claimed that he had been pursued by five agents and drowned in the sea off the coast of South America. Other reports claimed Yu was fed radioactive salt while in South America. In a 2025 book, Nigel West, former coauthor of Yu's case officer I.C. Smith, revealed that Yu had died in 2013. The location of his death and disposition of his remains are not publicly known. In December 2015, I.C. Smith publicly dispelled the claims that Yu was assassinated, remarking that he had spent a number of evenings moving pub-to-pub with Yu in the Georgetown neighborhood of Washington D.C.

== In popular culture ==
- David Ignatius, foreign affairs contributor to The Washington Post and spy novelist, published a four-part serialized fiction novella titled The Tao of Deception which provides a fictionalized account of Yu Qiangsheng's defection to the United States and extraction from Hong Kong.

== Selected books ==
- Mattis, Peter; Brazil, Matthew (2019). Chinese Communist Espionage: An Intelligence Primer. Annapolis, Maryland: Naval Institute Press. ISBN 978-1-68247-303-0.
