= Wang Zhizhen =

Chinese biophysicist (born 1942)

- 王志珍
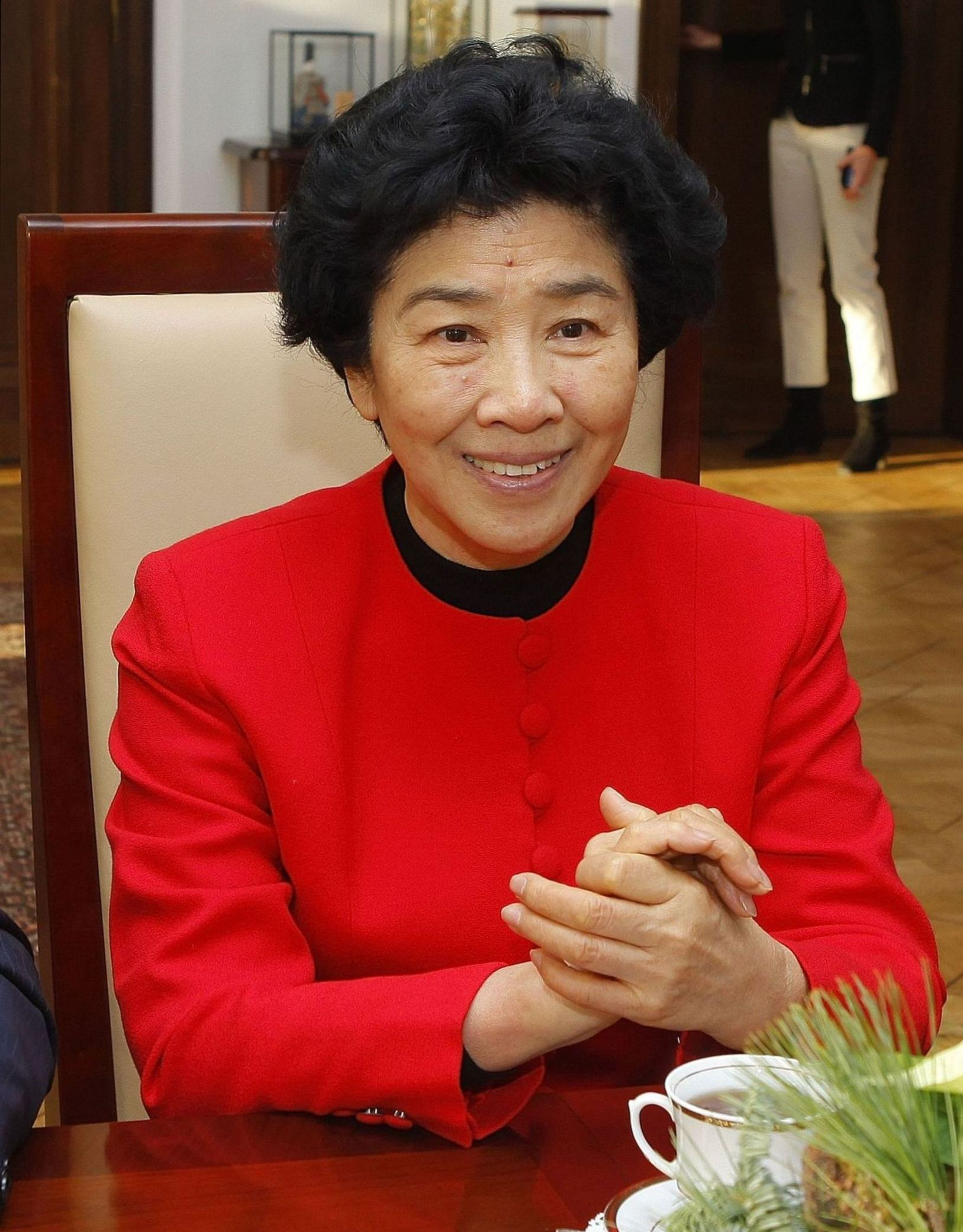
- Wang Zhizhen in 2012.
- Born: July 6, 1942 (age 83); Suzhou, Jiangsu, China
- Citizenship: China
- Scientific career
- Institutions: Institute of Biophysics, Chinese Academy of Sciences

Wang Zhizhen (Chinese: 王志珍; pinyin: Wáng Zhìzhēn; Wade–Giles: Wang Chih-chen; born July 6, 1942, in Suzhou Jiangsu), also known as Chih-Chen Wang, is a Chinese biophysicist and professor at the Institute of Biophysics, Chinese Academy of Sciences. She also served as Vice Chairperson of the 11th and 12th Central Committee of the Jiusan Society and Vice Chairperson of the 12th Chinese People's Political Consultative Conference.

== Life ==
Wang Zhizhen graduated from University of Science and Technology of China in 1964, then started to work at Institute of Biophysics of Chinese Academy of Sciences after graduation as an intern researcher. She became a researcher in 1993. She was elected academician of the Chinese Academy of Sciences in November 2001.
