= Zhang Meiying =

Chinese politician

Zhang Meiying (Chinese: 张梅颖; born January 1944) is a Chinese politician, who served as the vice chairperson of the Chinese People's Political Consultative Conference.
