= Wang Wenyuan =

Chinese politician (1931–2014)

Wang Wenyuan (Chinese: 王文元; February, 1931 – June 16, 2014) was a Chinese politician, who served as the vice chairperson of the Chinese People's Political Consultative Conference.
