= Liu Fei (artist) =

Chinese artist (born 1964)

Liu Fei (Chinese: 刘非, born 1964) is a Chinese contemporary artist based in Beijing.

He was born in Nanjing and later graduated from the Fine Arts Department of Nanjing Art Academy in 1989.

He is most known for his Bold+Trendy series of mostly grayscale paintings which feature bald women wearing bright red lipstick and pre-revolutionary Chinese school uniforms of the 1920 and 1930s, often times holding various firearms. His Bold+Trendy series has been the feature of various international auctions.

He has since progressed to producing landscape paintings with a surreal twist.

== Exhibitions ==
Solo exhibitions:

- "The Power of Fashion", Avanthay Contemporary, Zürich (2008)
- Galerie Frank Schlag & Cie., Essen (2007)
- L.A.Gallery solo show. Beijing (2006)
- Liu Fei Solo Exhibition，Shanghai (2006)
- Schoeni Art Gallery, Hong Kong (2005)
- Liu Fei Solo Exhibition, Gallery Beijing Space, (2004)

Group exhibitions:

- Zhang Hongbo, Liu Fei's Works Red Gate gallery, Beijing (2001)
- Red Gate gallery, Beijing (2001)
- Chinese Gallery, Thailand (2002)
- “Baldness & Vogue” Schoeni Gallery, Hong Kong (2003)
- Artists invitation exhibition, Beijing (2004)
- Bade art gallery, Taiwan (2005)
- Art Fair Shanghai International, Shanghai, 2006
- ROCKERS.ISLAND_OLBRICHT COLLECTION (2007)
- Mix & Retrospection – New Vision from China, Germany (2007)
