= Zhang Chong (politician) =

Chinese politician

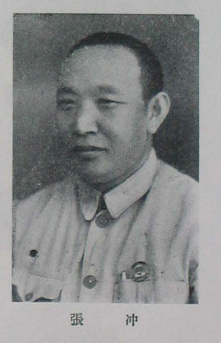
Zhang Chong as a delegate

Zhang Chong (Chinese: 张冲; February 26, 1900 – October 30, 1980) was a Chinese military and political leader. Initially a feared bandit chieftain and warlord of Yunnan, he distinguished himself as commander of the 50th Army during the Sino-Japanese War, then joined Mao Zedong and the Chinese Communist Party during the Chinese Civil War and went on to hold important positions in the new People's Republic of China, culminating in his service as Vice Chairman of the Chinese People's Political Consultative Conference.

== Life ==
Born in Luxi, Yunnan, Zhang Chong became a bandit in his teenage years, taking advantage of the chaotic Warlord era to become a feared and powerful figure in Southwest China through plunder, kidnapping and extortion. In 1926, Zhang was recruited by the warlord Long Yun, and his private bandit force was reorganized into the Fifth Division of the Yunnan Army. In 1935, when the Long March passed through Yunnan, Zhang Chong advised Long Yun to offer only token resistance, arguing that the Chinese Communist Party (CCP) was Chiang Kai-shek's problem, and that there was no need to waste resources fighting them, and his proposal was adopted.

After the outbreak of the Second Sino-Japanese War, Zhang Chong's troops were reorganized into the 184th Division of the 60th Army of the National Revolutionary Army. In 1942, when the Japanese invaded Yunnan from Burma, Zhang Chong was appointed the commander of the Yunnan Second Route Army, stationed in southern Yunnan. After the victory of the Anti-Japanese War, Zhang Chong was dismissed from the army. In October 1945, Long Yun was relieved of military power in Yunnan by Chiang Kai-shek, and since then Zhang Chong was in secret contact with the CCP.

In 1946, Zhang Chong secretly flew to Yan'an, supported Mao Zedong and, in February 1947, he officially joined the CCP.

During the Liaoshen campaign of the Chinese Civil War, Zhang Chong wrote a letter to persuade his old subordinate Zeng Zesheng to surrender, and made great contributions to the victory of the CCP in the siege of Changchun.

After the founding of the People's Republic of China, Zhang Chong became Vice Chairman of the Yunnan Provincial People's Government, serving under Lu Han, as well as a member of the Southwest China Military and Political Committee.

In 1954, he moved to Beijing and was elected to the National People's Congress, remaining a member until 1978, when he became a Vice Chairman of the Chinese People's Political Consultative Conference.

In October 1980, Zhang Chong died in Beijing at the age of 80.
