= Gu Shengzu =

Chinese male politician

- Chinese: 辜胜阻

Personal details
- Born: January 1956 (age 70) Wuhan, Hubei, China
- Party: China Democratic National Construction Association
- Education: Wuhan University
- Occupation: Professor, Politician

Gu Shengzu (Chinese: 辜胜阻, born January 1956) is a Chinese economist, professor, and politician from Wuhan, Hubei. He is a senior member of the China Democratic National Construction Association (CDNCA) and served as a Vice Chairman of the 13th Chinese People's Political Consultative Conference (CPPCC). Gu has been a leading figure in population economics, socio-economic policy research, and united front politics in China.

== Biography ==
Gu Shengzu began his professional career in 1975 as a community-run school teacher in Wangjiahe Town, Huangpi County, Hubei. He later worked as a laborer and publicity officer in Wuhan before entering the Department of Economics at Wuhan University in 1978. After graduating in 1982, he remained at Wuhan University as a lecturer and later associate professor. During this period, he pursued advanced studies abroad, completing graduate-level coursework at the University of Michigan between 1986 and 1988, and serving as a visiting scholar at both the University of Michigan and the East–West Center.

From 1988 onward, Gu assumed leadership roles at Wuhan University, including director of the Population Research Institute and later director of the Institute of Socioeconomic and Management Studies. He earned a doctorate in economics through an in-service postgraduate program at Wuhan University between 1988 and 1991. His academic career also included appointments as a visiting professor at Nihon University in Japan and the University of Michigan, as well as a visiting professorship at the University of Duisburg-Essen in Germany. In 1996–1997, he was a visiting research fellow at Harvard University.

Gu entered public administration in the late 1990s, serving as Vice Mayor of Wuhan from 1998 to 2002. He subsequently held senior positions at the All-China Federation of Industry and Commerce, first as an honorary vice chairman and later as a full-time vice chairman. From 2003 to 2005, he served as Vice Governor of Hubei Province.

Within the China Democratic National Construction Association, Gu served for a decade as full-time Vice Chairman (2007–2017) and was later promoted to Executive Vice Chairman. In 2018, he was elected Vice Chairman of the 13th CPPCC, a post he held until 2023. Throughout his political career, Gu has been involved in policy consultation on economic reform, population development, private-sector growth, and regional development strategies.
