= Su Hui (politician) =

Chinese politician

- 苏辉
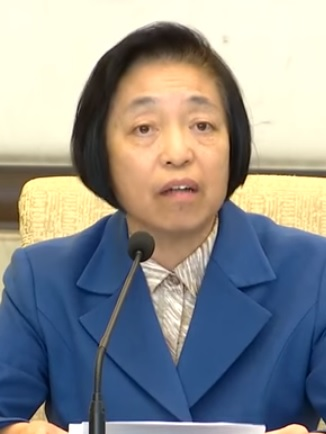

Vice Chairwoman of the Chinese People's Political Consultative Conference
- Incumbent
- Assumed office 14 March 2018
- Chairman: Wang Yang; Wang Huning

Chairwoman of the Taiwan Democratic Self-Government League
- Incumbent
- Assumed office 9 December 2017
- Preceded by: Lin Wenyi

Executive Vice Chairwoman of the Taiwan Democratic Self-Government League
- In office September 2017 – December 2017
- Chairwoman: Lin Wenyi
- Preceded by: Huang Zhixian
- Succeeded by: Li Yuefeng

Personal details
- Born: May 1956 (age 70) Changchun, Jilin, China
- Party: Taiwan Democratic Self-Government League (since 2007); Chinese Communist Party (since 1984)
- Parent: Cai Xiao (father)
- Education: Central University of Finance and Economics

Chinese name
- Traditional Chinese: 蘇輝
- Simplified Chinese: 苏辉
Transcriptions

Su Hui (Chinese: 苏辉; born May 1956) is a Chinese politician and leader of the Taiwan Democratic Self-Government League (TDSL).

== Biography ==
Su is the daughter of Cai Xiao, a native of Tainan, Taiwan and former TDSL Chairman.

From 1978 to 1982, Su majored in finance at the Central University of Finance and Economics.

In 1982, she started working at the Beijing Municipal Finance Bureau, where she later held multiple leadership positions.

On 25 January 2008, she was elected to the 11th National Committee of the Chinese People's Political Consultative Conference for the All-China Federation of Taiwan Compatriots.

In December 2017, she was elected as chairperson of the Taiwan Democratic Self-Government League at its 10th National Congress.
