= Zhang Qingli =

Chinese politician (born 1951)

- 张庆黎
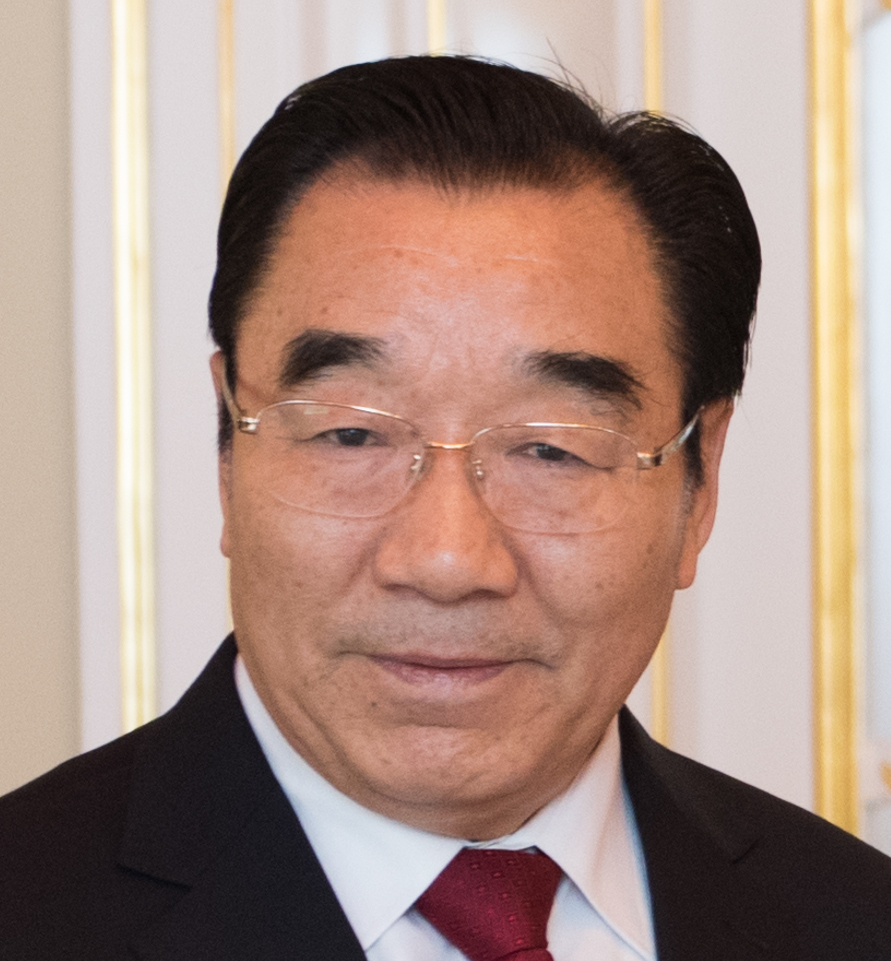

Vice Chairman of the Chinese People's Political Consultative Conference
- In office 11 March 2013 – 10 March 2023
- Chairman: Yu Zhengsheng; Wang Yang

Secretary-General of the National Committee of the Chinese People's Political Consultative Conference
- In office 11 March 2013 – 14 March 2018
- Chairman: Yu Zhengsheng
- Preceded by: Qian Yunlu
- Succeeded by: Xia Baolong

Party Secretary of Hebei
- In office 28 August 2011 – 20 March 2013
- Preceded by: Zhang Yunchuan
- Succeeded by: Zhou Benshun

Party Secretary of Tibet
- In office 29 May 2006 – 25 August 2011
- Preceded by: Yang Chuantang
- Succeeded by: Chen Quanguo

Personal details
- Born: 10 February 1951 (age 75) Dongping County, Shandong, China
- Party: Chinese Communist Party
- Education: Shihezi University; Central Party School of the Chinese Communist Party

Zhang Qingli
- Traditional Chinese: 張慶黎
- Simplified Chinese: 张庆黎
Transcriptions
Standard Mandarin
- Hanyu Pinyin: Zhāng Qìnglí

Zhang Qingli (Note: Chinese: 张庆黎; pinyin: Zhāng Qìnglí) (born 10 February 1951 in Dongping County, Shandong) is a retired politician of the People's Republic of China. He was the first-ranked vice-chairman of the 13th National Committee of the Chinese People's Political Consultative Conference (CPPCC). He was the vice-chairman and secretary-general of the 12th National Committee of the CPPCC. Previously he was the Chinese Communist Party Committee Secretary of Tibet Autonomous Region from 2006 to 2011 and of Hebei Province from 2011 to 2013. He was a member of the 16th, 17th and 18th Central Committees of the Chinese Communist Party (CCP).

== Biography ==
=== Shandong ===
Zhang Qingli started his career in January 1971, into the Shandong Province, Dongping fertilizer factory as a worker, and then served as workshop director, party branch secretary, deputy secretary of the party committee of the factory. During this period, he joined the CCP in February 1973, and entered the CCP Dongping County Committee in 1976, serving as a member of the Standing Committee of the County Committee and deputy director of the Industrial and Commercial Affairs Office, and began to take the road of politics; six months later, he was promoted to the position of Deputy Secretary of the CCP Dongping County Committee in 1976, and was appointed as the Deputy Secretary of the CCP Dongping County Committee until 1979.

June 1978 to January 1979, Zhang Qingli was seconded to the Central Committee of the Communist Youth League to work, become a career turnaround. 1979, officially transferred to the Central Committee of the Communist Youth League, since then until 1983, served as deputy director of the Central Committee of the Communist Youth League, the Ministry of Work and Agriculture Youth. In the meantime, from August 1980 to February 1981, he studied in Beijing Agricultural University. 1983 to 1986, served as deputy minister of the Central Committee of the Communist Youth League workers and peasants youth department. Between 1983 and 1985, he studied at the Central Party School of the Chinese Communist Party and obtained a college degree.

In 1986, Zhang Qingli became deputy mayor and secretary-general of the municipal government of Dongying City, Shandong Province, and was promoted to deputy secretary of the CCP Dongying Municipal Committee and deputy mayor in 1988. From March 1992 to July 1992, he studied at the Central Party School, and in 1993, he was promoted to Deputy Secretary of the CCP Dongying Municipal Party Committee and Mayor, and in 1995, he was transferred to Secretary of the CCP Tai'an Municipal Party Committee, and in 1997, he was appointed as the Chairman of the Standing Committee of the Tai'an Municipal People's Congress. From 1995 to 1997, he studied at the Party School of Shandong Provincial Committee of the CCP, specializing in economic management, and from 1997 to 1998, he served as the Executive Vice Minister of the Publicity Department of the Shandong Provincial Committee of the Chinese Communist Party, and in 1998, he was transferred to be the Executive Deputy Secretary General of the Shandong Provincial Committee of the CCP.

=== Gansu ===
In August 1998, he was promoted to member of the Standing Committee of the Gansu Provincial Committee of the Chinese Communist Party and Minister of the Publicity Department of the Provincial Committee; six months later, he was transferred to member of the Standing Committee of the Gansu Provincial Committee of the Chinese Communist Party and Secretary of the CCP Lanzhou Municipal Committee.

=== Xinjiang ===
In October 1999, he was transferred to member of the Standing Committee of the Xinjiang Uygur Autonomous Regional Committee of the Chinese Communist Party and Commander of the Xinjiang Production and Construction Corps; since January 2005, he has been concurrently serving as vice-chairman of the People's Government of the Xinjiang Uygur Autonomous Region (Chinese: 新疆维吾尔自治区人民政府). In March 2005, he was removed from the post of Commander of the Xinjiang Production and Construction Corps.

=== Tibet ===
In November 2005, Yang Chuantang, who was sent to Beijing for treatment of a cerebral hemorrhage. Zhang Qingli was appointed acting secretary of the CCP Tibet Autonomous Region Party Committee, and in May 2006, he was formally appointed secretary of the Tibet Autonomous Regional Committee of the Chinese Communist Party.

=== Hebei ===
In August 2011, after five years at the helm of Tibet, Zhang Qingli, who had reached the age of 60, was appointed secretary of the Hebei Provincial Committee of the Chinese Communist Party, and in January 2012, he was appointed head of the Standing Committee of the People's Congress of Hebei Province.

=== Beijing ===
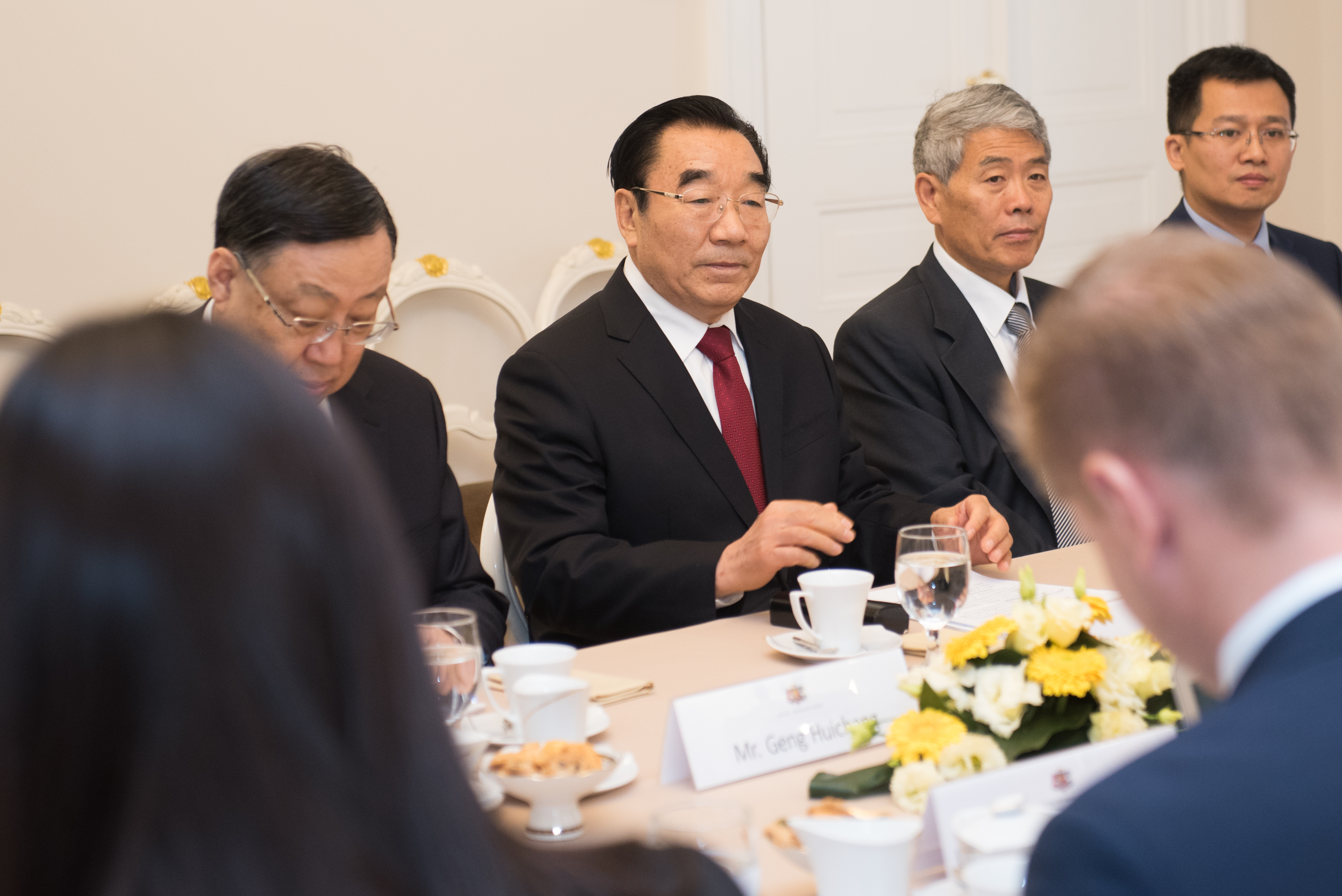
Speaker of the Saeima Ināra Mūrniece meets with Zhang Qingli on 6 July 2018

In March 2013, he became vice-chairman and secretary-general of the 12th National Committee of the Chinese People's Political Consultative Conference (CPPCC), becoming a deputy state-level party and state leader. In January 2018, he was elected as a member of the 13th National Committee of the CPPCC. In March, he was elected as vice-chairman of the 13th National Committee of the Chinese People's Political Consultative Conference.

On 31 July 2019, Zhang Qingli was elected Chairman of the Economic and Social Council of China (ESC) at the council's fifth session. In March 2023, at the age of 72, Zhang Qingli stepped down from his retirement as Vice Chairperson of the National Committee of the Chinese People's Political Consultative Conference (CPPCC) following the 14th National Committee of the Chinese People's Political Consultative Conference's first session.

== Notes ==
Party political offices
Preceded by Zhang Yunchuan	Party Secretary of Hebei; 2011–2013	Succeeded by Zhou Benshun
Preceded by Yang Chuantang	Party Secretary of Tibet; 2006–2011	Succeeded by Chen Quanguo
