= Liu Xincheng =

Chinese male politician

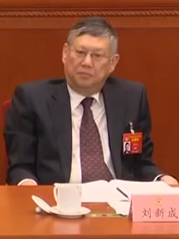
Liu Xincheng

Liu Xincheng (Chinese: 刘新成, born March 1952) is a Chinese male politician, who is currently the vice chairperson of the National Committee of the Chinese People's Political Consultative Conference.

== Life Experience ==
Liu Xincheng graduated from the History Department of Beijing Normal University (now Capital Normal University) and began teaching there in January 1985. He was appointed as a lecturer in 1986, associate professor in 1992, master's supervisor in 1994, and professor in 1995. From January 1996 to September 1998, he served as the head of the History Department at Capital Normal University, and in 1997, he was appointed as a doctoral supervisor. From October 1998 to July 2007, he served as the vice president of Capital Normal University, and from July 2007 to November 2013, he served as the president of the university.

In June 2007, Liu Xincheng was elected as the Chairman of the Beijing Municipal Committee of the Democratic Progressive Party, and later concurrently served as the Vice Chairman of the Central Committee of the Democratic Progressive Party. In January 2017, he resigned as Vice Chairman of the Standing Committee of the Beijing Municipal People's Congress.
