= Lin Wenyi =

Chinese engineer and politician

- 林文漪

Vice Chairwoman of the Chinese People's Political Consultative Conference
- In office March 2008 – March 2018
- Chairman: Jia Qinglin; Yu Zhengsheng

Chairwoman of the Taiwan Democratic Self-Government League
- In office December 2005 – December 2017
- Preceded by: Zhang Kehui
- Succeeded by: Su Hui

Personal details
- Born: September 1944 (age 82) Qingdao, Shandong, China
- Party: Taiwan Democratic Self-Government League
- Education: Tsinghua University

Lin Wenyi (Chinese: 林文漪; born September 1944) is a Chinese engineer and politician.

== Career and education ==
Lin was the Chairman of the Taiwan Democratic Self-Government League between 2005 and 2017, a legally sanctioned minor political party in China, a Vice Chairman of the Chinese People's Political Consultative Conference. Lin's father was from Tainan, Taiwan; she was born in Qingdao.

A graduate of Tsinghua University, Lin worked in Xinjiang as a technician in her early years. After her stint in Xinjiang ended in 1973, she began working for the Chinese Academy of Sciences as a physicist. She has an honorary doctorate (Doctor of Laws honoris causa) from the University of Liverpool. Beginning in 1994 she was a full-time professor at Tsinghua University.

Lin has served in a variety of political posts during her life. She joined the Taiwan Democratic Self-Government League in December 1990. She was deputy director of education of Beijing Municipality, the assistant to the mayor, and between 1996 and 2003, the vice mayor of Beijing. In March 2003 she was named deputy secretary-general of the National People's Congress Standing Committee.

In December 2005 Lin was named Chairman of the Taiwan Democratic Self-Government League. She was involved in the preparation of the Beijing Olympics.
