= Liu Fei (politician) =

Chinese politician

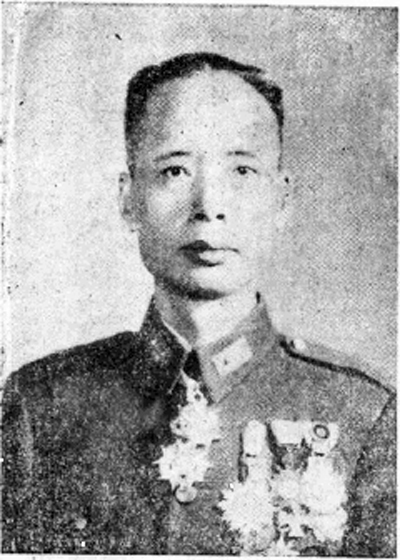
Liu Fei

Liu Fei (Chinese: 刘斐; October 26, 1898 – April 8, 1983) was a Chinese male politician and army general, who served as the vice chairperson of the Chinese People's Political Consultative Conference.
