= Li Meng (politician) =

Chinese politician

Li Meng (Chinese: 李蒙; born May 1937) was a Chinese male politician, who served as the vice chairperson of the Chinese People's Political Consultative Conference.
