= Chen Yuan =

Chinese economist

- 陈元

Vice Chairman of the Chinese People's Political Consultative Conference
- In office 11 March 2013 – 14 March 2018
- Chairman: Yu Zhengsheng

Personal details
- Born: January 1945 (age 81) Qingpu District, Jiangsu, China
- Citizenship: People's Republic of China
- Party: Chinese Communist Party
- Occupation: Chairman of China Association for International Friendly Contact

Chen Yuan (Chinese: 陈元, born in January 1945) is a Chinese economist who is the current chairman of the China Association for International Friendly Contact (CAIFC). He was previously the chairman of the China Development Bank from March 1998 to April 2013. Chen Yuan then served as Vice Chairman of the National Committee of the Chinese People's Political Consultative Conference from 2013 to 2018. He is the eldest son of former Vice Premier Chen Yun.

== Biography ==
Chen Yuan graduated with a master's degree in Industrial Economics from the Graduate School of Chinese Academy of Social Sciences, where he studied under the supervision of economists Yu Guangyuan and Ma Hong. He was appointed secretary of the Xicheng District Committee of the Beijing Municipal Committee of the Chinese Communist Party (CCP) and director-general of the Beijing Municipal Commerce and Trade Department in August 1982. He assumed the post of deputy secretary of the leading party members' group and vice governor of the People's Bank of China in March 1988.

Chen was appointed China Development Bank's governor in April 1998. Chen implemented reforms designed to increase CDB's autonomy by reducing state involvement in CDB's fundraising and lending.

Following the 2008 financial crisis, Chen was among the Chinese policymakers who favored China shifting from its traditionally passive management of its foreign exchange reserves to a more active approach. Chen's view was that China should hedge against increasing commodity prices and the falling US dollar by using its foreign exchange reserves to buy energy and mineral assets.

He has been the Chairman of the China Finance 40 Forum (CF40) from its founding in 2008.

Chen left his position as CDB governor in 2013. CDB's institutional power declined after Chen left.

In 2013, Chen became a vice chair of the National Committee of the Chinese People's Political Consultative Conference.
