= Li Keqiang government =

Li Keqiang government may refer to:

- 12th State Council of China – Also known as the first Li Keqiang government
- 13th State Council of China – Also known as the second Li Keqiang government
