= Liu Xiaofeng (politician) =

Chinese politician

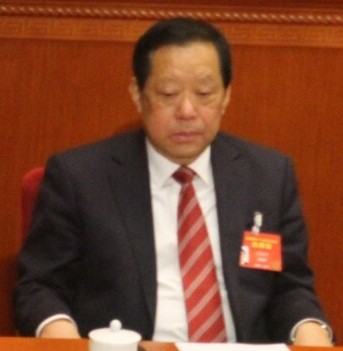
Liu Xiaofeng

Liu Xiaofeng (Chinese: 刘晓峰; January, 1947 – ) is a Chinese male politician, who served as the vice chairperson of the Chinese People's Political Consultative Conference.

== Early life ==
Liu was born in January of 1947 in Chengdu, Sichuan. He attended Chongqing Jiaotong University, studying hydraulic engineering of waterways and ports. Following graduation in 1970, Liu worked as a laborer at the Jiujiang Port Authority in Jiangxi. In 1972, he was transferred to Chengdu, where he held various roles including laborer, engineer, and director of the high-temperature strength room at Factory 420, where he would work until 1984. During this time, Liu studied metal physics at the Beijing Iron and Steel Institute. In 1984, he left Factory 420 to work in the Navigation Administration Bureau of the Sichuan Provincial Department of Transportation. Liu worked as an engineer, section chief, and senior engineer at the Bureau until being transferred to the Transportation Bureau of Muchuan County in 1991 to serve as deputy director. In 1992, he returned to the Navigation Administration Bureau to serve as its deputy director, a position he held until 1994 when he was promoted to the position of deputy director of the Sichuan Provincial Department of Transportation. In 1997, Liu was appointed the vice chairman of the Sichuan Provincial Committee of the Chinese Peasants' and Workers' Democratic Party (CPWDP), while still serving in his deputy director position. In 2002, he was promoted to chairman of the Sichuan Provincial Committee of the CPWDP while still maintaining his deputy director position.

== Provincial and national career ==
In 2003, Liu was appointed as Vice Governor of Sichuan as well as the chairman of the Sichuan Provincial Committee. He also shifted from his previous position at the CPWDP to become a member of its Central Standing Committee. He served in these positions until 2008, when he was elected as a standing committee member of the 11th National Committee of the Chinese People's Political Consultative Congress. In the same year, Liu also became the full-time vice chairman of the Central Committee of the CPWDP, and he left his post as chairman of the Sichuan Provincial Committee but remained a member. Liu left the Sichuan Provincial Committee in 2012, becoming the executive vice chairman of the Central Committee of the CPWDP, a ministerial-level position. In 2013, he became a vice chairman of the 12th National Committee of the Chinese People's Political Consultative Congress while maintaining his position within the CPWDP.
