= Qi Xuchun =

Chinese politician

Qi Xuchun (Chinese: 齐续春; born February 1946) is a Chinese politician of Manchu ethnicity, originally from Beijing. He holds a university degree in computational mathematics from the Department of Mathematics and Mechanics at Peking University. Over the course of his career, he has held numerous important positions, including Executive Vice Chairman of the Central Committee of the Revolutionary Committee of the Chinese Kuomintang (RCCK), Vice Chairman of the 12th Chinese People's Political Consultative Conference (CPPCC), and member of the Standing Committee of the 11th National People's Congress (NPC), where he also served as Deputy Director of the Foreign Affairs Committee.

== Education and early career ==
Qi entered Peking University in 1964 and graduated in 1969 with a degree in computational mathematics. Like many university graduates during the Cultural Revolution, he was sent to the countryside, where he worked as an "educated youth" at the Xiayuan People's Commune in Chengde County, Hebei Province. There, he also served as a technician at the county broadcasting station.

From 1971 to 1987, he taught at Chengde County No. 1 Middle School, eventually becoming head of the physics teaching and research group.

== Government service and party work ==
Qi began his political career in 1987 as Deputy County Head of Chengde County. He was later appointed Vice Chairman of the Chengde Municipal CPPCC in 1990 and served as Deputy Mayor of Chengde from 1991 to 1996. He joined the Revolutionary Committee of the Chinese Kuomintang (RCCK) in January 1995.

In 1996, he was named Deputy Director of the Hebei Provincial Education Commission, and from 1998 to 2000, he also served as Vice Chairman of the Hebei Provincial CPPCC.

Qi moved to the national level in 2000 as full-time Deputy Secretary-General of the CPPCC National Committee. In 2004, he was elected Vice Chairman of the 10th Central Committee of the RCCK. From 2007 to 2008, he served as full-time Vice Chairman and Secretary-General of the RCCK Central Committee, continuing as Vice Chairman until 2012, when he was elected Executive Vice Chairman.

== National leadership ==
In March 2013, Qi Xuchun was elected Vice Chairman of the 12th CPPCC, a position that marked the culmination of his long career in both regional and national politics.
