= Luo Fuhe =

Chinese politician

Luo Fuhe (Chinese: 罗富和; born in September 1949) is a Chinese politician, who served as the vice chairperson of the Chinese People's Political Consultative Conference.

In 2017, he criticised internet censorship in China, saying that it "hampered scientific research and economic development".
