= Li Haifeng =

Chinese politician

- Chinese: 李海峰
Transcriptions
Standard Mandarin
- Hanyu Pinyin: Lǐ Hǎifēng

Li Haifeng (born February 1949) is a Chinese politician. A native of Laoting, Hebei, she did her graduate studies at the Central Party School of the Chinese Communist Party (CCP), and went on to positions such as committee secretary of the Daqing branch of the Communist Youth League of China, Standing Committee Member of the Daqing Field branch of the CCP, Vice Chair of the All-China Youth Federation. She also served as a delegate to the 5th and 6th Chinese People's Political Consultative Conferences. In May 2007, she was promoted to her position as head of the Overseas Chinese Affairs Office of the State Council of the People's Republic of China. Two months later, as part of her official duties, she toured Chinese American and Chinese Canadian communities in the five cities of San Francisco, Los Angeles, New York, Vancouver, and Toronto.
