= Chen Xiaoguang =

Chinese male politician

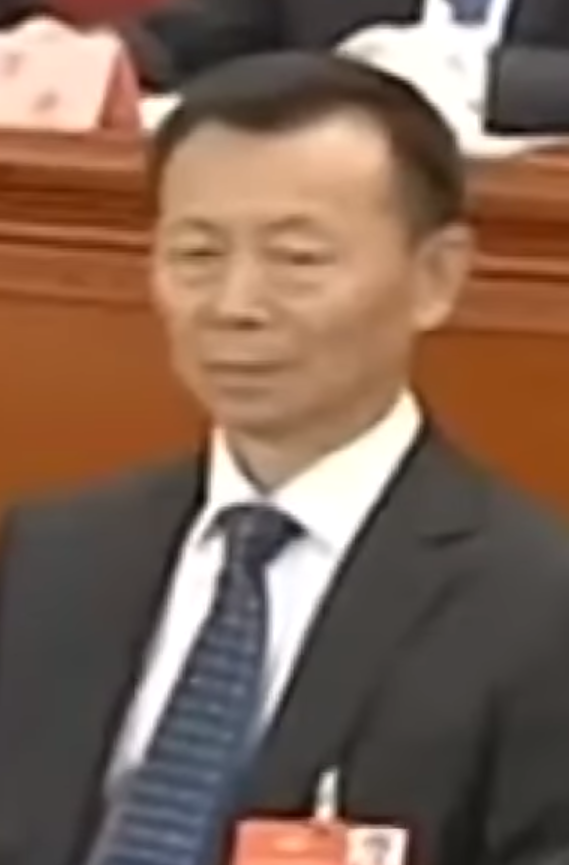
Chen Xiaoguang

Chen Xiaoguang (Chinese: 陈晓光, born May 1955) is a Chinese male politician, who is currently the vice chair of the National Committee of the Chinese People's Political Consultative Conference.
