= Ma Peihua =

Chinese politician

Ma Peihua (Chinese: 马培华; August 1949 –) is a Chinese male politician, who served as the vice chairperson of the Chinese People's Political Consultative Conference.
