= All-China Federation of Industry and Commerce =

Chamber of commerce in China

- 中华全国工商业联合会

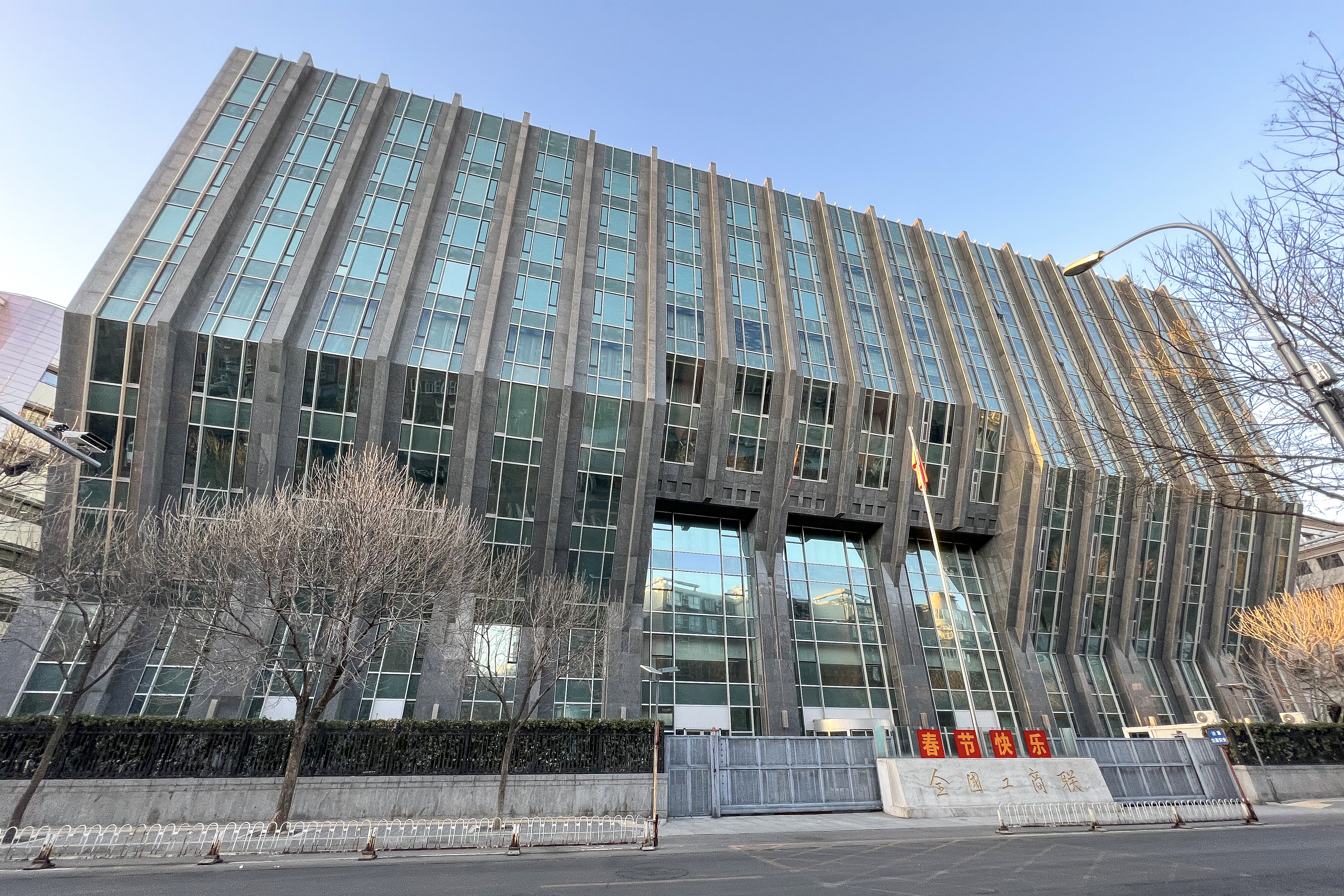
- Headquarters
- Abbreviation: ACFIC
- Formation: 1953
- Founder: Chen Shutong
- Type: Business association
- Legal status: People's organization
- Location: Beijing, China
- Members: 4.71 million
- Chairman: Gao Yunlong
- Executive Vice Chairman: Xu Lejiang
- Parent organization: United Front Work Department
- Website: www.chinachamber.org.cn (in English); www.acfic.org.cn (in Chinese)

All-China Federation of Industry and Commerce
- Simplified Chinese: 中华全国工商业联合会
- Traditional Chinese: 中華全國工商業聯合會
Transcriptions
Standard Mandarin
- Hanyu Pinyin: Zhōnghuá Quánguó Gōngshāngyè Liánhéhuì

Abbreviation
- Simplified Chinese: 全国工商联
- Traditional Chinese: 全國工商聯
Transcriptions
Standard Mandarin
- Hanyu Pinyin: Quánguó Gōngshānglián

All-China Chamber of Industry and Commerce
- Simplified Chinese: 中国民间商会
- Traditional Chinese: 中國民間商會
Transcriptions
Standard Mandarin
- Hanyu Pinyin: Zhōngguó Mínjiān Shānghuì

The All-China Federation of Industry and Commerce (ACFIC) is a people's organization and chamber of commerce, established in 1953 as a successor to the chambers of commerce that were first founded during the Qing dynasty.

The organization is overseen by the United Front Work Department of the Central Committee of the Chinese Communist Party, is a constituent organization of the National Committee of the Chinese People's Political Consultative Conference (CPPCC), and its delegates hold a number of seats in the National People's Congress. The organization assists the government in managing China's private sector economy and acts as a bridge between the private sector entities and the government.

== History ==
The ACFIC is a non-governmental chamber of commerce established in 1953. It was intended as a successor to the pre-1949 chambers of commerce. The ACFIC was established to advance the Chinese Communist Party (CCP)'s interests and promote the party's policies among private entrepreneurs.

Later in the Mao Zedong era, the ACFIC stopped functioning as the state absorbed private capital, enterprises, and equipment. It resumed operating in 1979.

Prior to the 1990s, the ACFIC's membership drew from private and state-owned enterprises. During the 1990s, it became increasingly focused on the private sector. Private sector entrepreneurs began holding leadership roles in the ACFIC beginning in 1993. In 1997, ACFIC excluded the state-owned sector from membership.

== Organization ==
The ACFIC is overseen by the United Front Work Department of the Central Committee of the Chinese Communist Party. It is led by a ministerial-level CCP committee secretary and chairman. The chairman has usually been a member of the China National Democratic Construction Association, also serving as a vice chairman of the Chinese People's Political Consultative Conference. ACFIC leadership is chosen through consultation between the CCP and private enterprise. Its administrative staff are civil servants paid by the party-state.

The ACFIC is a constituent of the CPPCC and is allocated seats to the NPC.

It functions as a bridge between its affiliated business associations and the People's Political Consultative Conferences. ACFIC seeks to influence policy through submitting proposals to the CPPCC, a process which requires relevant government ministries to investigate the proposals and prepare a formal response. These proposals include matters of interest to the private sector generally, particular industries, or matters specific to particular enterprises or business associations.

Research by academics Dongya Huang and Minglu Chen concludes that between 2009 and 2016, 20% of ACFIC's national level proposals resulted in new policies or policy changes.

Other major ACFIC activities include workshops and training sessions to teach CCP policies and ideology to ACFIC members.

More than 3,000 regional federations of industry and commerce (FIC) have been established in all provinces and prefectures and most counties of China. The relationship between ACFIC and the regional FIC is described as a role of guidance, but the statute of ACFIC is also valid for the regional federations.

In September 2020, the CCP announced that it would establish more party committees in regional FICs, and would arrange a special liaison between them and the CCP.

== See also ==
- Economic history of China (1949-present)
- Technological and industrial history of China
