= Wang Qinmin =

Chinese politician

Wang Qinmin (Chinese: 王钦敏; December, 1948 – ) is a Chinese male politician, who served as the vice chairperson of the Chinese People's Political Consultative Conference.
