= Cross-Strait Forum =

The Cross-Strait Forum may be:

- Cross-Strait Economic, Trade and Culture Forum, started in 2006
- Cross-Strait Peace Forum, started in 2013
- Straits Forum, started in 2009
