= Ji Bin =

Chinese politician (born 1966)

- 纪斌

Vice President of the All-China Federation of Taiwan Compatriots
- Incumbent
- Assumed office January 2007
- President: Zheng Jianmin

Personal details
- Born: September 1966 (age 60) Taichung, Taiwan, Republic of China
- Party: Chinese Communist Party; Taiwan Democratic Self-Government League
- Education: Peking University; University of Edinburgh

Chinese name
- Simplified Chinese: 纪斌
- Traditional Chinese: 紀斌
Transcriptions
Standard Mandarin
- Hanyu Pinyin: Jì Bīn

Ji Bin (Chinese: 纪斌; born September 1966) is a Chinese politician who is the current vice president of the All-China Federation of Taiwan Compatriots, in office since January 2007.

He was a member of the 12th National Committee of the Chinese People's Political Consultative Conference. He is an alternate of the 20th Central Committee of the Chinese Communist Party.

== Biography ==
Ji was born in Taichung, Taiwan, in September 1966. He graduated from Peking University with a Bachelor of Arts before gaining an MBA from the University of Edinburgh.

Starting in August 1989, he served in several posts in the Chinese People's Association for Friendship with Foreign Countries, including section member of the Eurasian Department, director of the Eurasian Department, deputy director of the Eurasian Department I, director of the Eurasian Department I, and deputy director of the Eurasian Department.

He was chosen as vice president of the All-China Federation of Taiwan Compatriots in January 2007.
