= Xie Xuehong =

Taiwanese politician

- 謝雪紅
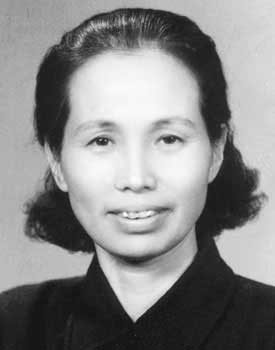
- Xie in 1952

Chair of the Taiwan Democratic Self-Government League
- In office 1949–1958
- Preceded by: Position established
- Succeeded by: Cai Xiao (1979)

Personal details
- Born: Siā A-lú (謝阿女); 17 October 1901 Shōka town, Shōka district, Taichū Prefecture, Japanese Taiwan (today Changhua City, Taiwan)
- Died: 5 November 1970 (aged 69) Beijing, China
- Citizenship: Empire of Japan (1901–1945); Republic of China (1945–1949); People's Republic of China (after 1949)
- Party: Taiwanese Communist Party (1928–1931); Chinese Communist Party (1948–1958); Taiwan Democratic Self-Government League (1947–1958)
- Other political affiliations: Taiwanese People's Party (1928–1931)
- Education: Shanghai University

Xie Xuehong
- Traditional Chinese: 謝雪紅
- Simplified Chinese: 谢雪红
Transcriptions
Standard Mandarin
- Hanyu Pinyin: Xiè Xuěhóng

Birth name
- Traditional Chinese: 謝阿女
- Simplified Chinese: 谢阿女
Transcriptions
Standard Mandarin
- Hanyu Pinyin: Xiè Ānǚ

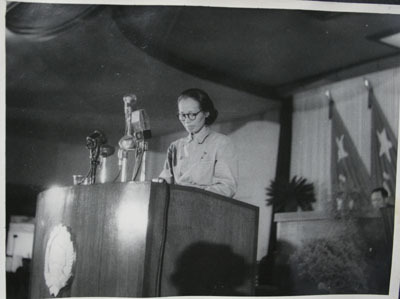
Xie at the first Taiwan Democratic Self-Government League (Taimeng) conference in 1949

Xie Xuehong (or Hsieh Hsueh-hung, sometimes Sha Shets-ho in Taiwanese Hokkien; Chinese: 謝雪紅; Pe̍h-ōe-jī: Siā Soat-hông; 17 October 1901 – 5 November 1970), born Siā A-lú (謝阿女), was a Taiwanese revolutionary and politician. A women's rights activist, she co-founded the Taiwanese Communist Party, active in Japanese Taiwan. Persecuted by the Kuomintang after its forces retreated to Taiwan, she escaped to China, where she became a member of the Taiwan Democratic Self-Government League and the Chinese Communist Party.

== Biography ==
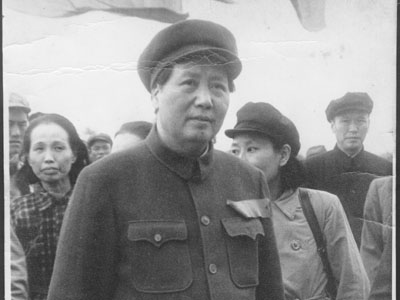
Mao Zedong at the 1949 Proclamation of the People's Republic of China with Xie in the background. In 1958, Xie was removed from the Taimeng, the CCP and the National People's Congress.

Xie was born in Changhua County in 1901 to a working-class family, the fourth of seven children. She assumed at least five other names throughout her lifetime. At the age of twelve, she moved in with another family. Her adoptive family was abusive, and, instead of entering an arranged marriage with their son, Hong Xinhu, she left their home. Xie met and married Zhang Shumin in 1918. For a time, the couple lived in Kobe, Japan, where the Taishō period of democracy heavily influenced Xie. Soon after Xie and Zhang moved to China, the couple split, as Xie had discovered that Zhang was still married to another woman. Xie then began to give sewing lessons, while also making and selling clothes. The May Fourth Movement was a political turning point for Xie, and she later joined Chiang Wei-shui's resistance against Japanese rule. Xie studied sociology at Shanghai University and took part in the May Thirtieth Movement of 1925, the same year she was told to join the Chinese Communist Party. Xie then moved to Moscow for further education at the Communist University of the Toilers of the East, which she attended for two years. In November 1927, she returned to China and began taking actions that led to the founding of the Taiwanese Communist Party (TCP) in 1928. At the direction of Sen Katayama, cofounder of the Japanese Communist Party (JCP), Xie and Lin Mu-shun began recruiting for what would become the TCP in Shanghai. Both traveled to Japan to seek help from the JCP on a draft of a party charter, which was smuggled by Xie past Japanese authorities in Shanghai upon her return to China in February 1928. The TCP's charter was approved by a Chinese Communist Party official using the pseudonym Peng Jung on 13 April 1928, and the Taiwanese Communist Party's founding ceremony was held two days later.

Xie's ideology spread to Chiang's Taiwanese People's Party and Taiwanese Cultural Association after she took on leadership positions in the two groups. She believed that maintaining a distinct Taiwanese identity and allowing bourgeoisie to participate would allow communism to flourish in Taiwan. Others disagreed and Xie was expelled from the Taiwanese Communist Party in 1931. Later that year, she was arrested and sentenced to 13 years imprisonment for advocating communism. In 1939, Xie was released after catching tuberculosis.

Xie returned to political activism in 1945, when Kuomintang forces arrived in Taiwan, stating that "Taiwan must be ruled by Taiwanese." In September 1946, Xie established the Taiwan People's Association, which was disestablished by the Kuomintang government in January 1947. In 1947, she convened the 27 Brigade and was involved in the February 28 incident from her home base in Taichung, telling the masses not to damage property or injure anyone. Three weeks later, she escaped to Hong Kong, where she founded the Taiwan Democratic Self-Government League, and later moved to Xiamen. Under Xie's leadership, the league opposed the aims of the Formosan League for Reemancipation, which backed formal independence or trusteeship. At its founding, Taimeng backed liberation of Taiwan from the control of Chiang Kai-shek and the Kuomintang. In China, Xie was active in the China Youth League and served on the Chinese People's Political Consultative Conference. However, Xie continued to push for Taiwan's right to self-determination, views for which the Chinese Communist Party targeted her during the Anti-Rightist Campaign; she was accused of being a "Taiwan independence [supporter]" and "local ethnic nationalist".

Actions taken against Xie included her removal as leader of Taimeng, her expulsion from the CCP and removal from the National People's Congress, all in 1958. Xie died in Beijing in 1970, while facing criticism during the Cultural Revolution. Since 1986, the Chinese Communist Party has posthumously rehabilitated her and reclaimed her as an opponent of Taiwanese independence.
