= Taiwan Democratic Self-Government League =

Minor political party in China

Taiwan Democratic Self-Government League 台湾民主自治同盟 Táiwān Mínzhǔ Zìzhì Tóngméng
- Abbreviation: TDSL
- Chairperson: Su Hui
- Vice Chairpersons: Wu Guohua, Zheng Jianmin, Jiang Liping, Kong Lingzhi, Fu Zhiguan
- Founders: Xie Xuehong, Yang Kehuang, Su Xin, etc.
- Founded: 12 November 1947; 78 years ago
- Preceded by: Taiwanese Communist Party
- Headquarters: 14 Zuojiazhuang W Street; Chaoyang District, Beijing
- Newspaper: Taimeng (The TDSL); Xin Taiwan Congkan (New Taiwan Series; only in Hong Kong, before 1949)
- Membership (2022): 3,400
- Ideology: Socialism with Chinese characteristics; Chinese unification; Anti–Taiwan independence; Before 1958: Taiwanese nationalism; Anti-imperialism
- National People's Congress (14th): 14 / 2,977
- NPC Standing Committee (14th): 3 / 175
- CPPCC National Committee (14th): 20 / 544 (Seats for political parties)

Website
- www.taimeng.org.cn

Taiwan Democratic Self-Government League

Chinese name
- Simplified Chinese: 台湾民主自治同盟
- Traditional Chinese: 臺灣民主自治同盟
Transcriptions
Standard Mandarin
- Hanyu Pinyin: Táiwān Mínzhǔ Zìzhì Tóngméng

Abbreviation
- Simplified Chinese: 台盟
- Traditional Chinese: 臺盟
Transcriptions
Standard Mandarin
- Hanyu Pinyin: Táiméng

Tibetan name
- Tibetan: ཐའེ་ཝན་དམངས་གཙོ་རང་སྐྱོང་མནའ་མཐུན་
Transcriptions
- Wylie: tha'e wan dmangs gtso rang skyong mna' mthun

Zhuang name
- Zhuang: Daizvanh Minzcuj Swci Dungzmungz

Mongolian name
- Mongolian Cyrillic: Дайвааны ардчилсан өөртөө засах холбоо
- Mongolian script: ᠲᠠᠶᠢᠸᠠᠨ ᠤ; ᠠᠷᠠᠳᠴᠢᠯᠠᠭᠰᠠᠨ; ᠥᠪᠡᠷᠲᠡᠭᠡᠨ ᠵᠠᠰᠠᠬᠤ; ᠬᠣᠯᠪᠣᠭ᠎ᠠ

Uyghur name
- Uyghur: تەيۋەن دېموكراتىك ئاپتونوم ئىتتىپاقى
Transcriptions
- Latin Yëziqi: teywen démokratik aptonom ittipaqi
- Yengi Yeziⱪ: teywen démokratik aptonom ittipaqi

Manchu name
- Manchu script: ᡨᠠᡳᠮᡝᠩ
- Romanization: Taimeng

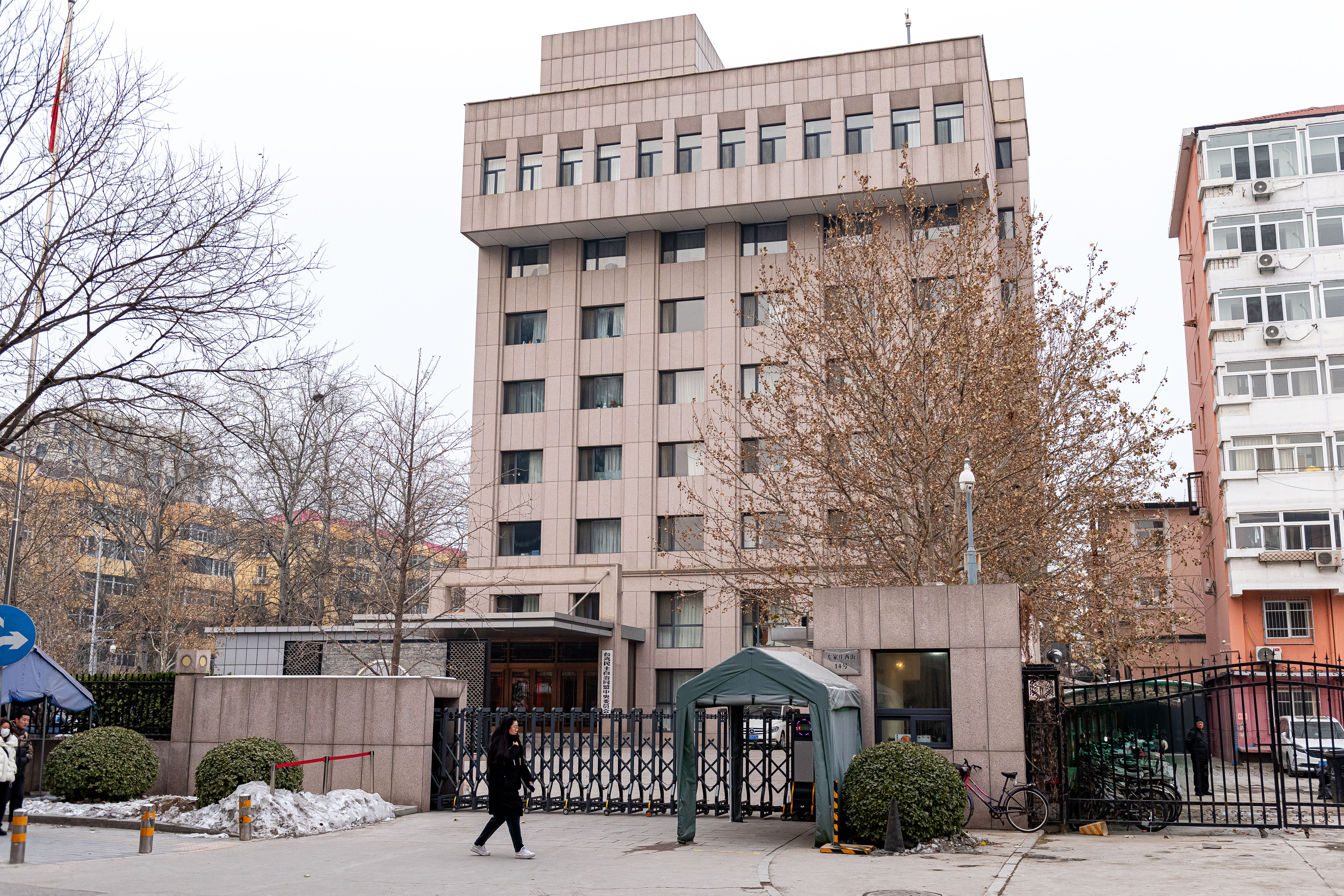
The headquarters of the Central Committee of the Taiwan Democratic Self-Government League

The Taiwan Democratic Self-Government League (TDSL), also known by its Chinese abbreviation Taimeng (simplified Chinese: 台盟; traditional Chinese: 臺盟), is one of the eight minor non-oppositional political parties in the People's Republic of China, officially termed "democratic parties," led by the Chinese Communist Party.

Founded in the then-British colony of Hong Kong in November 1947 by members of the Taiwanese Communist Party who survived the February 28 incident, TDSL is mostly composed of prominent people from Taiwan or people of Taiwanese heritage who now reside on the mainland. It is the eighth-ranking minor party in China. It currently has 14 seats in the National People's Congress, 4 seats in the NPC Standing Committee and 20 seats in the National Committee of the Chinese People's Political Consultative Conference; it is the smallest legally recognized minor political party in the People's Republic of China. TDSL supports Chinese unification. The party does not participate in the political system of Taiwan. Its current chairwoman is Su Hui.

== History ==
The party was founded in the then-British colony of Hong Kong on 12 November 1947, by members of the Taiwanese Communist Party who survived the February 28 incident. The party's founding chair, Xie Xuehong, was the leader of a communist armed resistance movement against the Nationalists in central Taiwan after the February 28 incident. The February 28 incident and the subsequent crackdown caused large portions of the Taiwanese diaspora, such as those in Japan, to sympathize with the Chinese Communists. The party quickly established branches in Japan where they worked to oppose the Taiwan independence activist Thomas Liao's calls for a United Nations plebiscite on the status of Taiwan. Before 1958, the party advocated for communism in Taiwan but supported Taiwanese self-determination. The party is now opposed to Taiwan independence.

== Organization ==
According to its constitution, the TDSL is officially committed to socialism with Chinese characteristics and upholding the leadership of the CCP. The TDSL supports Chinese unification and opposes Taiwan independence. It is the eighth-ranking minor democratic party in China. As of 2023, it has 14 seats in the National People's Congress (including 6 seats as part of the Taiwan delegation), and 30 seats in the National Committee of the Chinese People's Political Consultative Conference (including 20 of the seats reserved for political parties).

The highest body of the TDSL officially is the National Congress, which is held every five years. The 11th National Congress, held in December 2022, was the most recently held Party Congress. The National Congress elects the Central Committee of the TDSL. The chairperson of the TDSL Central Committee is usually a vice chairperson of the National Committee of the Chinese People's Political Consultative Conference. In June 2022, the party had organizations in 19 province-level administrative divisions throughout China. The TDSL publishes the newspaper Taimeng (The TDSL). It historically published the Xin Taiwan Congkan (New Taiwan Series) before 1949 while it was based in Hong Kong.

=== Composition ===
The TDSL is mostly composed of prominent people from Taiwan or people of Taiwanese heritage who now reside on the mainland. As of June 2022, it has 3,400 members.

=== Chairpersons ===
No.	Chairperson	Took office	Left office	Ref.
1	Xie Xuehong 谢雪红	October 1949	January 1958	
2	Cai Xiao 蔡啸	October 1979	December 1983	
3	Su Ziheng 苏子蘅	December 1983	November 1987	
4	Lin Shengzhong 林盛中	November 1987	December 1988	
5	Cai Zimin 蔡子民	December 1988	November 1997	
6	Zhang Kehui 张克辉	November 1997	December 2005	
7	Lin Wenyi 林文漪	December 2005	December 2017	
8	Su Hui 苏辉	December 2017	Incumbent	

=== National People's Congress elections ===
Election year	Number of seats
2017–18	13 / 2,970
2022–23	14 / 2,977
