= Huang Chin-tao =

Taiwanese war veteran (1926–2019)

- 黃金島
- Born: Huang Tsuen-tao (黃圳島); 28 September 1926; Taichū, Taiwan
- Died: 8 January 2019 (aged 92)
- Spouse: Wang Chao-e
- Military career
- Allegiance: Empire of Japan; Republic of China
- Branch: Imperial Japanese Navy; 27 Brigade; ROCMC
- Unit: Independent Security Brigade
- Conflicts: Second Sino-Japanese War; February 28 incident; Battle of Wuniulan
- Awards: Human Rights Award

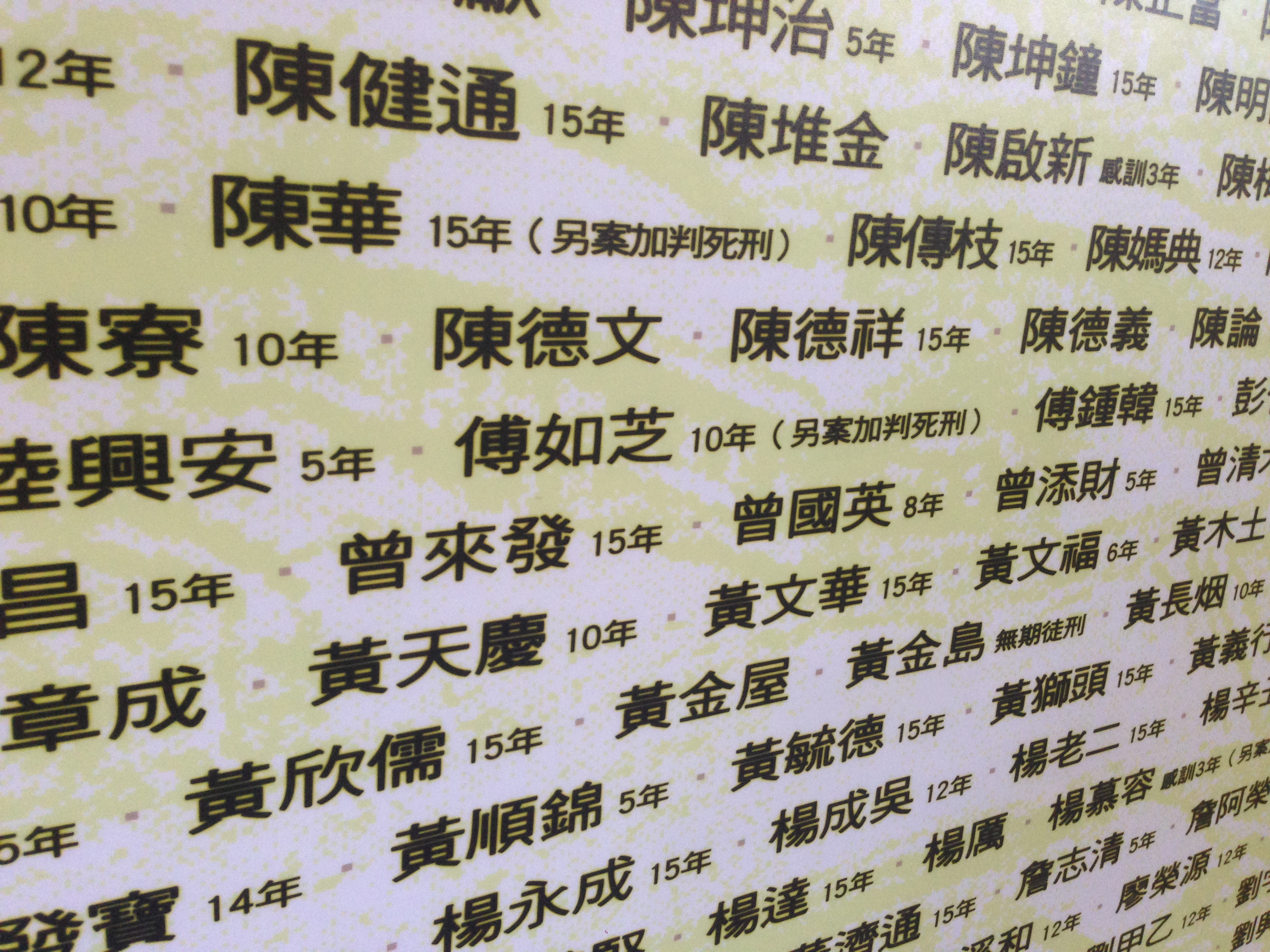
Huang Chin-tao commemorated at the Green Island White Terror Memorial Park

Huang Chin-tao (Chinese: 黃金島; pinyin: Huáng Jīndǎo; Pe̍h-ōe-jī: N̂g Kim-tó; 28 September 1926 – 8 January 2019) was a Taiwanese World War II veteran who served in the Imperial Japanese Navy and resistance fighter affiliated with the 27 Brigade.

== Biography ==
He was born to a family of farmers in Taichung as Huang Tsuen-tao (黃圳島; Huáng Zhèndǎo). He traveled to Japan in 1941, seeking admission to medical school. Instead, the next year, aged 16, Huang enlisted in the Imperial Japanese Navy to prove that Taiwanese could be just as capable as Japanese despite discrimination. He was assigned to the transportation division. During Huang's first military action, an unsuccessful sea rescue, his lifeboat capsized. He was later stationed on Hainan. At the end of the Second Sino–Japanese War, Japanese prisoners of war were permitted to return home, but Taiwanese soldiers and their families were placed in Kuomintang-run camps on Hainan. Huang soon escaped and traveled to Haikou, where he ran a small business. Huang escaped the island entirely in May 1946. After a month of sailing the Taiwan Strait, Huang and a group of Taiwanese landed in Chiayi. He settled in Taichung.

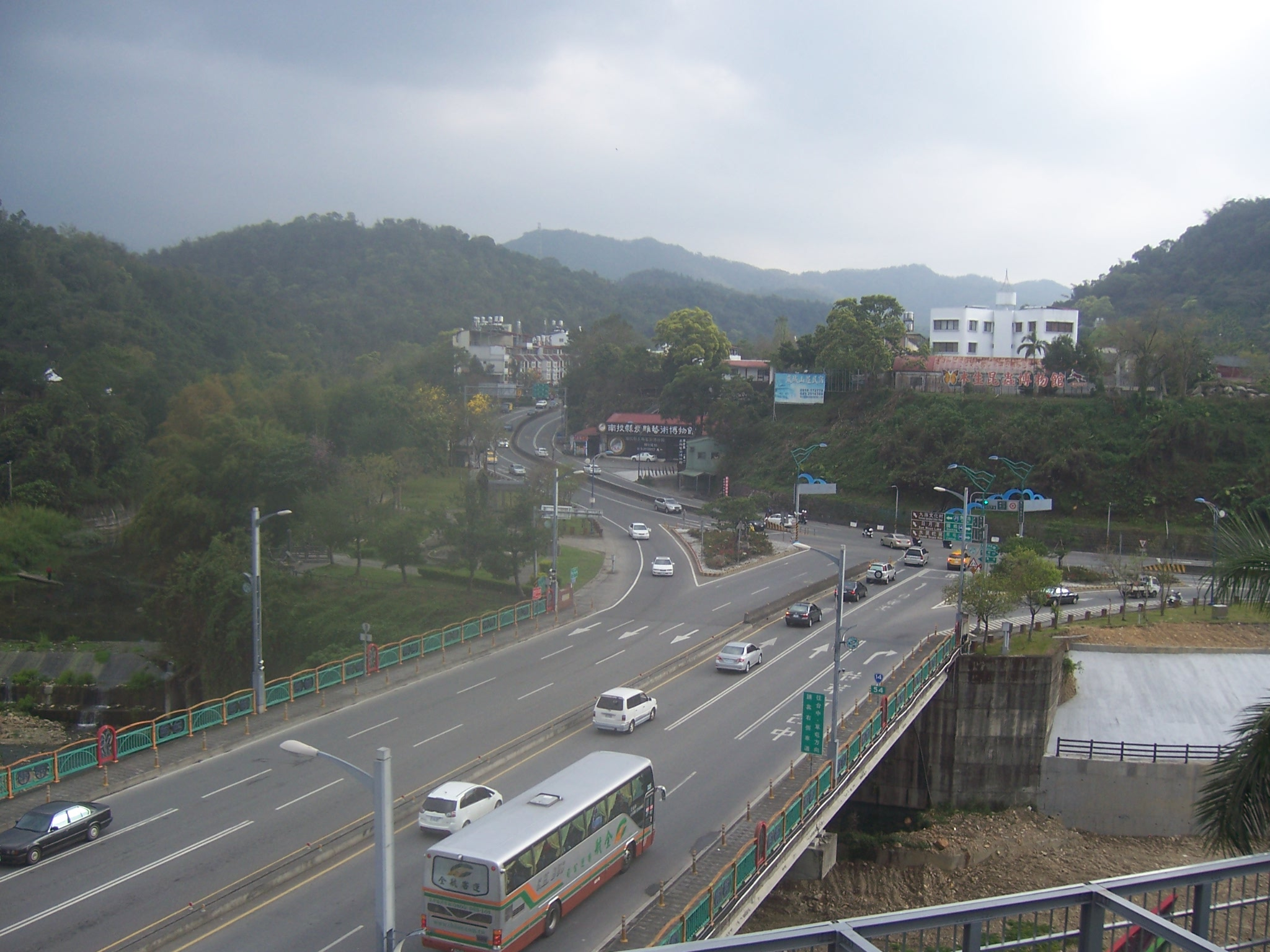
The Ailan Bridge (pictured 2014) was later built on the site of the Battle of Wuniulan

The 228 Incident broke out on 28 February 1947. By the next day, the violence had reached Taichung. Huang witnessed Kuomintang forces killing civilians in front of the Taichung Hotel. Huang subsequently joined Hsieh Hsueh-hung's Independent Security Brigade. He was the only group member with military experience. The Independent Security Brigade merged with others and was renamed the 27 Brigade on 6 March 1947. Hsieh remained leader of the reconstituted force, while Huang was responsible for its security unit. Kuomintang forces reached Puli on 13 March. The 27 Brigade sent out a small force to raid the KMT position at Sun Moon Lake, and, led by Huang, formally engaged the Kuomintang on 16 March in the Battle of Wuniulan. Hsieh elected to end the resistance upon learning that the brigade's headquarters at the Puli Butokuden had fallen.

Following the end of the resistance, Huang Tsuen-tao changed his name to Huang Chin-tao and assumed his brother's identity to work at a tire factory. Huang elected to return to military service, and enlisted in the Republic of China Marine Corps under his new name. He was assigned to the Armor Training Command. During his ROCMC service, Huang was repeatedly jailed and questioned. He was eventually charged with insurgency, jailed for the final time on 1 June 1952, and sentenced to death. Huang's sentence was later commuted to life imprisonment. After the death of Chiang Kai-shek in 1975, Huang was granted parole. Huang and his wife Wang Chao-e were in attendance at the Human Rights Day commemoration on 10 December 1979 that became known as the Kaohsiung Incident. In 1986, Huang became a founding member of the Democratic Progressive Party and was active in the DPP's Taichung chapter. Huang left politics to continue his activism, focused on the continuing democratization of Taiwan and the events of the 228 Incident. He led tours of monuments created to honor the 27 Brigade, many of which he pushed authorities to build. In 2000, the Chen Shui-bian presidential administration gave Huang the Human Rights Award. He died on 8 January 2019, and at his funeral on 21 January 2019, was posthumously awarded a presidential citation.

In 2024, Anna Beth Keim published a biography of Huang, Heaven Does Not Block All Roads. Keim had become interested in Huang’s life after reading a blog post about him, and she met him in 2016.
