= Taiwan delegation to the National People's Congress =

Taiwan Delegation to the National People's Congress
- 台湾省全国人民代表大会代表
- Delegation for the National People's Congress
- Map showing the location of Taiwan Province
- Electoral unit: Taiwan Province
- Number of electors: 122 (members of the consultative election meeting)
- Population: 23,550,077

Current Delegation
- Created: 1975
- Seats: 13
- Head of delegation: Zheng Jianmin
- Provincial People's Congress: N/A
- Election method: Elected by a consultative election conference

The Taiwan delegation to the National People's Congress is a delegation composed of deputies representing the People's Republic of China's claimed Taiwan Province within the National People's Congress (NPC), the supreme organ of state power in the country. NPC deputies from Taiwan Province are officially elected from among Taiwan residents within the provinces, autonomous regions, direct-administered municipalities, and the People's Liberation Army.

== History ==
Taiwan is currently governed by the Republic of China. The lack of a Taiwan delegation at the National People's Congress (NPC) led to the formal establishment of a 12-member Taiwan delegation during the 4th NPC session in 1975, responsible for proposing relevant policies within the province, similar to other provinces and municipalities. Subsequently, three years later, at the 5th NPC session, a resolution was passed to temporarily elect 13 NPC deputies from Taiwan to attend the sessions, with the remaining seats allocated proportionally to population to be reserved for future unification.

The election of Taiwan delegates for Taiwan Province is done in accordance with the Decision (from time to time made) of the relevant session of relevant National People's Congress of the PRC on the number of deputies to the National People's Congress and the election of the deputies. For example, in 2002 that Decision was as follows:

"For the time being, 13 deputies representing Taiwan Province shall be elected from among people of Taiwan origin in the other provinces, the autonomous regions, and the municipalities directly under the Central Government, and the Chinese People's Liberation Army."

Having regard to the relevant Decision, the Standing Committee of the National People's Congress adopts a "Plan for the Consultative Election of Deputies of Taiwan Province to the National People's Congress". The Plan typically provides that "the deputies will be elected in Beijing through consultation from among representatives sent by Taiwan compatriots in these provinces, autonomous regions, and municipalities directly under the Central Government and in the Chinese People's Liberation Army."

In the case of the 2002 election, the Standing Committee noted that there were more than 36,000 "Taiwan compatriots" in the 31 provinces, autonomous regions, and municipalities directly under the Central Government and the central Party, government and army institutions. It was decided that 122 representatives would participate in the conference for election through consultation. The number of representatives was allocated on the basis of the geographic distribution of Taiwan compatriots on the mainland and the standing committees of the people's congresses of the provinces, autonomous regions, and municipalities directly under the Central Government were responsible for making arrangements for the election of the representatives through consultation. The Standing Committee's Plan also provided that the election should be "conducted in a democratic manner".

According to the Consultative Election Plan for Representatives of Taiwan Province to the 12th National People's Congress, from among the approximately 33,000 Taiwanese people scattered throughout mainland China at the time, around 120 representatives were coordinated by province to participate in a week-long consultative election conference in Beijing. From these representatives, the final 13 National People's Congress deputies were elected, and the remainder became members of the National Committee of the Chinese People's Political Consultative Conference (CPPCC). Most of these 120-plus members had parents born in Taiwan; later, this was relaxed to include those with one parent born in Taiwan. A smaller number were Taiwanese who had settled in mainland China and obtained mainland residency. Taiwanese residing in mainland China and holding Hong Kong, Macau, and Taiwan resident permits are considered citizens of the Republic of China (ROC), referred to as people of the Taiwan region by the ROC. These individuals primarily include Taiwanese businesspeople, employees, and students. In theory, all Taiwanese residents can run for office, but according to Taiwan's Cross-Strait Act, "People, legal persons, groups or other organizations in the Taiwan area shall not hold positions or be members of any party, military, administrative or political organs (organizations) or groups in the Mainland Area that are prohibited by the Mainland Affairs Council of the Executive Yuan in consultation with the relevant competent authorities", meaning that if participants return to Taiwan, Penghu, Kinmen and Matsu, they may be transferred to the Taiwanese government for prosecution.

Most of the new generation of Taiwanese delegates to the National People's Congress are no longer born in Taiwan, but their ancestral home is Taiwan. In 2008, only Chen Yunying, the wife of economist Justin Yifu Lin, was born in Taiwan among the 13 delegates to the National People's Congress. The Legislative Affairs Commission of the Standing Committee of the National People's Congress stipulated that "Taiwanese compatriots who invest in the mainland and are in the mainland during the election of county and township people's congress representatives can participate in the election in their current place of work." In 2002, a Taiwanese businessman named Zeng Yushu was elected as a representative to the People 's Congress of Yinzhou District, Ningbo City. In 2008, Lin Zhongguang, a Taiwanese businessman in Xiamen, was nominated as a candidate for the People's Congress of Siming District, but he was not elected. To date, no National People's Congress representative has been elected as a Taiwanese compatriot while retaining a complete Republic of China citizenship.

The Mainland Affairs Council of Taiwan believes that since the People's Republic of China does not actually control Taiwan, most of the representatives are only registered residents of Taiwan and are not elected by the people of Taiwan, so they cannot represent the public opinion of Taiwan.

== Election ==
Delegations from Taiwan are chosen by a "consultative election conference" composed of 120 "compatriots of Taiwanese ancestry" hailing from various provinces in China, the central government and party agencies, and the military. Since the 6th NPC, Taiwan has been given 13 deputies at the NPC.

== Deputies ==
Year	NPC session	Deputies	Number of deputies	Ref.
1959	2nd	Vacant		
1964	3rd	Vacant		
1975	4th	Wang Biyun (female), Tian Fuda, Feng Yanhuo, Li Li (female), Li Chen, Zhang Guizhu (female), Chen Musen, Chen Yisong, Lin Liyun (female), Lin Deshi, Zhong Weiwang, Cai Zimin	12	
1978	5th	Tian Fuda, Feng Yanhuo, Jiang Shuisheng, Li Chen, Wu Guozhen, Chen Musen, Chen Yisong, Lin Liyun, Lin Liangcai, Lin Minmin, Lin Deshi, Zhong Bingsong, Cai Zimin	12	
1983	6th	Lu Guosong, Tian Fuda (Gaoshan ethnic group ), Liu Caipin, Jiang Shuisheng, Li Zhimin, Li Chen, Wu Guozhen, Qiu Baoyun, Chen Musen, Fan Zengsheng, Lin Liyun, Guo Pingtan, Cai Zimin	13	
1988	7th	Tian Fuda, Liu Caipin, Jiang Shuisheng, Li Chen, Yang Yuhui, Wu Guozhen, Zhang Qia, Lu Yizhong, Chen Guizhou, Fan Zengsheng, Lin Liyun, Huang Shunxing, Cai Zimin	13	
1993	8th	Wang Ansheng, Tian Fuda (Gaoshan ethnic group), Liu Caipin, Jiang Shuisheng, Li Chen, Yang Yuhui, Wu Guozhen, Zhang Kehui, Chen Guizhou, Fan Zengsheng, Lin Liyun, Hong Tao, Cai Zimin	13	
1998	9th	Liu Yiming, Yang Guoqing, Zhang Yongjun, Zhang Xidong, Chen Guizhou, Chen Weiwen, Fan Zengsheng, Hu Yafang (Gaoshan ethnic group), Hong Tao, Liang Yanjun, Cai Shengding, Wei Lihui	13	
2003	10th	Wang Qiongying (female), Liu Qi, Yang Guoqing, He Daxin, Zhang Yongjun, Chen Yunying (female), Chen Jiande, Chen Weiwen, Fan Zengsheng, Hu Yafang (female, Gaoshan ethnic group), Hu Youqing, Zhan Gaoyue, Wei Lihui (female).	13	
2008	11th	Kong Lingzhi, Zhu Taiqing, Wu Qiongkai, He Daxin, Zhang Xiong, Chen Yunying (female), Chen Jun (female, Gaoshan ethnic group), Chen Qinghai, Chen Weiwen, Chen Yaozhong, Hu Youqing, Liang Guoyang, Wei Lihui (female)	13	
2013	12th	Kong Lingzhi, Zhu Taiqing, Jiang Erxiong (female), Yang Xiaohong (female), Wang Yifu, Zhang Xiaodong, Zhang Xiong, Chen Yunying (female), Chen Jun (female, Gaoshan ethnic group), Chen Qinghai, Chen Weiwen, Fu Zhiguan, Liao Haiying	13	
2018	13th	Xu Pei, Zou Zhenqiu, Zhang Xiaodong, Zhang Xiong, Chen Yunying, Chen Jun, Lin Qing, Huang Zhixian, Fu Zhiguan, Liang Zhiqiang, Zeng Liqun, Cai Peihui, Liao Haiying	13	
2023	14th	Li Xingkui, Zou Zhenqiu, Chen Yunying, Chen Yongdong, Chen Guijing, Lin Qing, Zhou Qi, Zheng Jianmin, Tao Jun, Zeng Liqun, Cai Peihui, Liao Zhihao, Yan Ke	13	
