= Lin Hsien-tang =

Taiwanese politician and activist (1881–1956)

- 林獻堂

Member of the Taiwan Representative Council
- In office May 1946 – July 1946
- Constituency: Taichung County

Member of the House of Peers
- In office 3 April 1945 – 4 July 1946 Nominated by the Emperor

Personal details
- Born: 13 December 1881 Changhua County, Qing Taiwan
- Died: 8 September 1956 (aged 74) Kugayama, Tokyo, Japan

Lin Hsien-tang (Chinese: 林獻堂; pinyin: Lín Xiàntáng; Pe̍h-ōe-jī: Lîm Hiàn-tông; 13 December 1881 – 8 September 1956) was a Taiwanese politician and activist who founded several political organizations and sat on the Japanese House of Peers.

== Early life and family ==
Lin Hsien-tang's earliest Taiwan-based ancestor was Lin Shi, who crossed the Taiwan Strait in 1746 and settled in Changhua, and is a progenitor of the Wufeng Lin family, whose ancestral home is the Wufeng Lin Family Mansion and Garden in Wufeng District, Taichung. Lin Hsien-tang was born in 1881 to Lin Wenqin and his wife, who died when Lin Hsien-tang was young. Lin was raised by his grandmother, tutored at home and became a wealthy landlord based in Taichung. Lin was a member of the Chestnut Leaved Oak Poetry Society, established in 1902, and offered his house as the headquarters for the group. Lin Hsien-tang became patriarch of the Lin family in 1904, when the son of Lin Chao-tung, Lin Tzu-keng, moved to China after his father's death. Lin Tzu-keng later renounced Japanese citizenship and became the first Taiwanese to be granted Republic of China citizenship in 1913. Despite living on Japanese Taiwan from 1895, Lin Hsien-tang spoke only Hokkien and did not learn Japanese. He married Yang Shuei-hsin. The couple raised four children, sons Lin Pan-lung, Lin You-lung, Lin Yun-lung, and daughter Lin Guan-guan. Lin Hsien-tang was a patron of the arts, responsible for partial funding of Yen Shui-long's education in France.

== Later life and activism ==
Lin Hsien-tang was an admirer of Liang Qichao; the two met in Japan in 1907. Liang stressed to Lin that China would be unable to help end Japanese colonialism in Taiwan, and advised against armed rebellion. They met again in Taiwan in 1911. Subsequently, Lin co-founded several sociopolitical initiatives against Japanese rule. The Taiwan Assimilation Society, established by Lin in 1914 with the help of Itagaki Taisuke, espoused assimilation and equality between Japanese and Taiwanese. In 1920 the Taiwan Youth published its first issue. The publication was funded by Lin Hsien-tang, Lin Hsiung-cheng, Koo Hsien-jung, and Yen Yun-nien. Lin Hsien-tang was a cofounder of the Taiwanese Cultural Association and Taiwanese People's Party. Lin took leadership roles in both organizations. While leading the Taiwanese Cultural Association, Lin headed the Petition Movement for the Establishment of a Taiwanese Parliament to secure Taiwanese representation within the imperial Japanese government. Starting in 1921, Lin submitted annual petitions to the Imperial Diet, asking to convene a Taiwan Provincial Assembly. The initiative, taken over by the League for the Establishment of a Formosan Parliament in 1923, was unsuccessful, and ended in 1934. In 1926, Lin and Chen Hsin founded the Tatung Trust Company.

In May 1927, Lin embarked on a year-long trip across the world, spending most of his time in Europe and the United States. His travel writings included frequent social commentary, and appeared in Taiwan Minpao from 1927 to 1931.

After he returned to Taiwan, Lin and Tsai Pei-huo founded the Taiwanese Alliance for Home Rule in 1930, which advocated for local autonomy. Several members of the Taiwanese's People's Party that joined the new alliance were expelled from the party, and Lin withdrew from the party in protest. Lin's work with the alliance resulted in the local elections of 1935. Lin himself was named to the House of Peers. In 1936, he was forced to resign from all his public positions. The alliance disbanded in August 1937, after the start of the Second Sino-Japanese War. Near the war's end, Lin and five others from Taiwan went to Shanghai to meet Kuomintang-affiliated officials and Taiwanese expatriates based in the city. While in Shanghai, Lin and his delegation were invited to attend the signing of an instrument of surrender between Yasuji Okamura and He Yingqin. However, the group did not arrive in time for the ceremony.

Lin began learning Mandarin, and lent his support to the Kuomintang. Lin met with Chen Yi immediately upon Chen's arrival in Taiwan on 24 October 1945. Lin became a member of the Kuomintang in November of that year, and was later appointed to the Taiwan Provincial Assembly, then known as the Taiwan Representative Council. The provincial legislature forced land reform, despite objections from landowners, several of whom were targeted during the 228 Incident of 1947. As the events of the uprising led to unrest in Taichung, Lin called for veteran military officer Wu Chen-wu to led a resistance movement, distrusting 27 Brigade leader Hsieh Hsueh-hung for her communist beliefs. Lin remained a member of the Taiwan Representative Council after the uprising. The legislative body held little power, and Lin attempted to resign several times, only to be refused. As a result, Lin left Taiwan for Japan on 23 September 1949, on leave for medical treatment. Lin ignored all calls to return to Taiwan, and he died in Tokyo in September 1956.

== Legacy ==
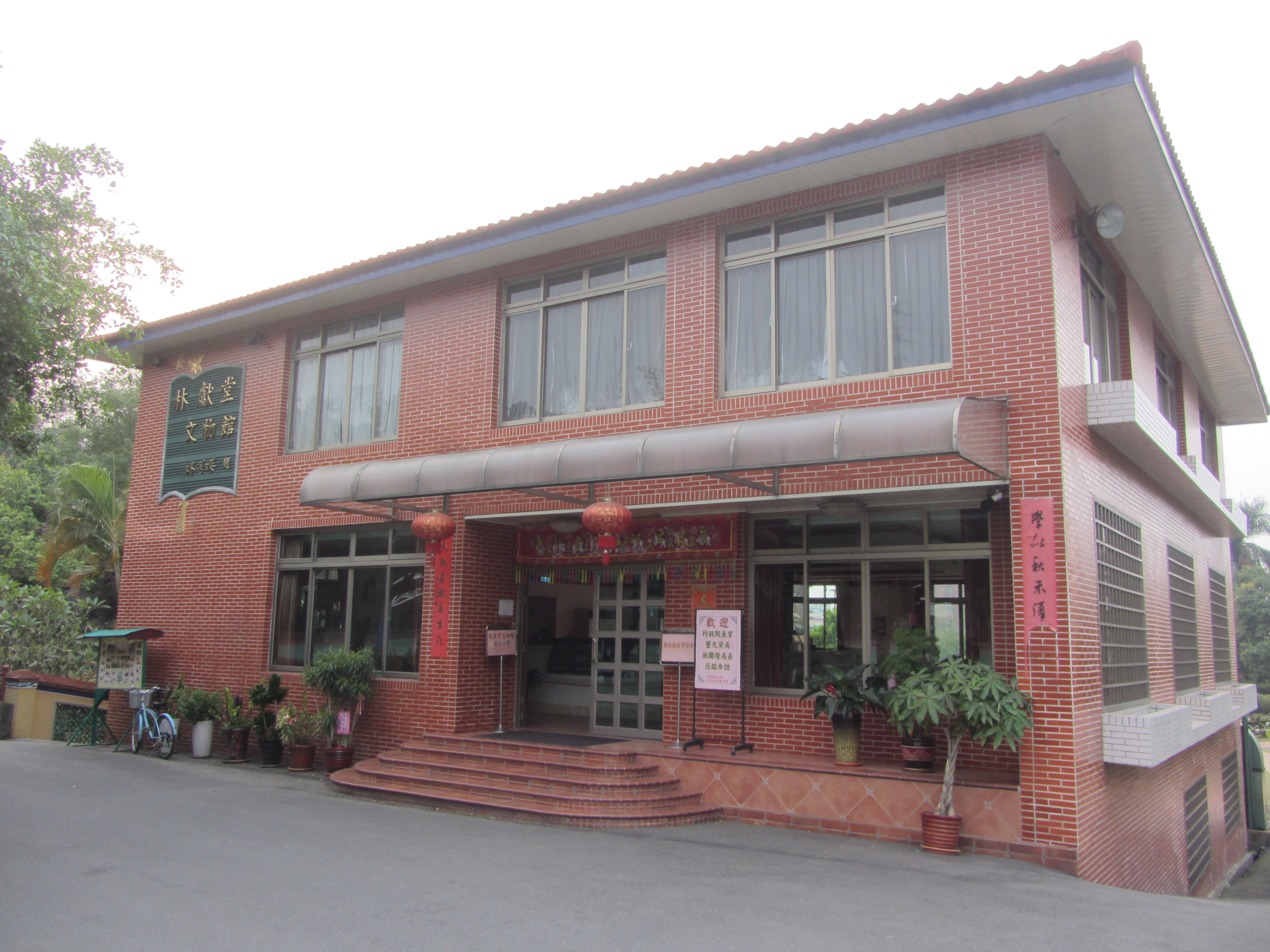
Lin Hsien-tang Residence Museum

Lin Hsien-tang’s Travel Writings from around the Globe, based on Lin's writing while overseas from 1927 to 1928, was posthumously published after Lin's secretary Yeh Jung-chung finished editing it in Lin's stead. Lin Fang-ying, a descendant of Lin Hsien-tang's, opened the Lin Hsien-tang Residence Museum to commemorate him in May 2019.
