= Institute of Taiwan Studies =

Chinese government research institute

- Formation: September 1984; 42 years ago
- Type: National-level academic research institution on Taiwan studies
- Headquarters: No. 21, Zhongguancun East Road Haidian District, Beijing
- Director: Zhu Weidong
- Parent organization: Ministry of State Security
- Affiliations: Chinese Academy of Social Sciences
- Website: cass.its.taiwan.cn

Institute of Taiwan Studies
- Simplified Chinese: 中国社会科学院台湾研究所
- Traditional Chinese: 中國社會科學院台灣研究所
Transcriptions
Standard Mandarin
- Hanyu Pinyin: Zhōngguó Shèhuì Kēxuéyuàn Táiwān Yánjiūsuǒ

Abbreviation
- Simplified Chinese: 中国社科院台研所
- Traditional Chinese: 中國社科院台研所
Transcriptions
Standard Mandarin
- Hanyu Pinyin: Zhōngguó Shèkēyuàn Táiyánsuǒ

The Institute of Taiwan Studies is an organization hosted within the Chinese Academy of Social Sciences and managed by the 15th Bureau of the Ministry of State Security, the principal civilian intelligence agency of the People's Republic of China. The institute conducts research on Taiwan's politics, economy, society, culture, foreign relations and cross-strait relations.

== History ==
The Institute of Taiwan Studies was established in September 1984 with the approval of the secretariat of the Chinese Communist Party. In 1988, the Institute of Taiwan Studies founded the quarterly journal Taiwan Studies. In 2004, it was adjusted to a bimonthly journal. In 1993, the Institute of Taiwan Studies founded Taiwan Weekly, which is a Taiwan-related news weekly sponsored by the institute. Since 1991, the National Society of Taiwan Studies, the All-China Federation of Taiwan Compatriots, and the Institute of Taiwan Studies have jointly hosted the Cross-Strait Relations Academic Seminar every year, referred to as the "Three Taiwan Forums."

The Institute of Taiwan Studies is one of the most important Taiwan research institutions in mainland China. It often holds various academic activities. For example, from June 29 to 30, 2013, the Taiwan Reform Foundation of former Democratic Progressive Party Chairman Frank Hsieh hosted a seminar on the development and innovation of cross-strait relations at the Harbour Grand Hong Kong Hotel in Hong Kong, with the Institute of Taiwan Studies as a co-organizer. On October 11–12, 2013, the 21st Century Foundation and the National Association for Taiwan Studies hosted the first Cross-Strait Peace Forum, with the Institute of Taiwan Studies as one of the co-organizers.

On December 25, 2023, the Institute of Taiwan Studies founded the English academic journal China Taiwan Studies, which is the first English academic journal in mainland China focusing on the study of cross-strait relations.

== Functions ==
The Institute of Taiwan Studies is an academic institution that conducts research on Taiwan's politics, economy, society, culture, foreign relations and cross-strait issues. It is the latest of the more than 30 institutes under the Chinese Academy of Social Sciences. All funds are allocated to the Chinese Academy of Social Sciences by the Ministry of Finance and then to the Institute of Taiwan Studies. The Institute of Taiwan Studies has no affiliation with any institution other than the Chinese Academy of Social Sciences, such as the Taiwan Affairs Office of the State Council.

== Structure ==
The Institute of Taiwan Studies at CASS is under the control of the 15th Bureau of the Ministry of State Security. The internal structure of the Institution includes:

- Taiwan Politics Research Office
- Taiwan Economic Research Office
- Taiwan External Relations Office
- Taiwan-US Relations Research Office
- Comprehensive Research Room
- Taiwan Social Culture and Personality Research Room
- Editorial Department of Taiwan Studies
- Taiwan Research Institute Website Editorial Department
- Research Cooperation Office
- Reference Room
- Office
- Personnel Department

=== Director ===
- Kan Nianyi (1984 – ?, person in charge)
- Jiang Dianming (? – 1996)
- Xu Shiquan (1996 – ?)
- Li Jiaquan (? – ?, deputy director in charge of work)
- Yu Keli (2003 – 2013)
- Zhou Zhihuai (December 6, 2013 – 2017)
- Yang Mingjie (2017 – 2023)
- Zhu Weidong (2023 – )

== Reception in Taiwan ==
Taiwan has held a deep suspicion and concerns about the various Taiwan-related institutions in the PRC. In 2002, officials from Taiwan's National Security Bureau claimed in the Legislative Yuan that Jiang Dianming, former director of the Institute of Taiwan Studies, was the director of the 15th Bureau of the Ministry of State Security (MSS); Jiang Dianming's public identity was that he was a reporter for Xinhua News Agency, and he later served as deputy editor-in-chief of Guangming Daily, belonging to the propaganda department. In early December 2000, the deputy director of the National Security Bureau stated at the Democratic Progressive Party Legislative Yuan caucus that Yu Keli, deputy director of the Institute of Taiwan Studies, who had visited Taiwan for academic exchanges in 2000, "was not only a high-level think tank on mainland China's Taiwan policy, but his actual identity was 'deputy director of the 15th Bureau of the Ministry of State Security'"; but the information finally confirmed was that the MSS had no relationship with Yu Keli. In 2005, Yu Keli said that the accusations made by relevant Taiwanese parties against mainland scholars on Taiwan studies were based on the rigid Cold War mentality and politicized normal academic exchanges between the two sides of the Taiwan Strait. Later, Yu Keli frequently visited Taiwan and was not blocked.

However, similar suspicions have continued to be heard in Taiwan since then. For example, on March 11, 2015, Want Daily reported that the Institute of Taiwan Studies was nominally affiliated with the Chinese Academy of Social Sciences, but its actual personnel and funding came from the MSS, and it was a bureau-level unit. The predecessor of the Institute of Taiwan Studies was the Taiwan Studies Institute of the Central Investigation Department of the CCP, which was responsible for collecting and analyzing Taiwan intelligence. It was later transferred to the MSS due to the abolition of the Central Investigation Department. The statement of Caixun Biweekly in November 2016 was similar to that of Want Daily, except that it said that after the abolition of the Taiwan Studies Institute of the Central Investigation Department, it was transferred to the MSS and the Intelligence Department of the General Staff of the People's Liberation Army. The statements of Want Daily and Caixun Biweekly are exactly the same as those made by the deputy director of the National Security Bureau of the Republic of China in 2000.

On the morning of June 15, 2015, Shi Fanglong, director of the LSE Taiwan Research Program, met with Zhou Zhihuai, director of the Institute of Taiwan Studies, Zhang Hua, assistant researcher of the Institute of Taiwan Studies, Liu Guoshen, dean of the Institute of Taiwan Studies of Xiamen University, Li Peng, deputy dean of the Institute of Taiwan Studies of Xiamen University, Xin Qiang, director of the Center for Taiwan Studies of Fudan University, and Zhang Jiegen, associate researcher of the Institute of International Studies of Fudan University, to discuss China's Taiwan policy and cross-strait relations, Taiwan's domestic political development, the United States' Asia-Pacific policy and its geopolitical impact on the security situation in East Asia. On January 14, 2020, Xia News quoted the website of the LSE Taiwan Research Program to disclose this matter, saying that the Institute of Taiwan Studies of the Chinese Academy of Social Sciences, the Institute of Taiwan Studies of Xiamen University, the National Association for Taiwan Studies and the Shanghai Institute of Taiwan Studies are all "Chinese think tanks and intelligence units that integrate Taiwan research, intelligence gathering and united front propaganda".

== See also ==
- Chinese unification
- Propaganda in China
