= 1935 Taiwanese local elections =

Local elections were held for the first time in Taiwan by the Japanese colonial government on 22 November 1935, electing half of the city and township councillors. The other half were appointed by the prefectural governors.

Only men aged 25 and above and who had paid a tax of five yen or more a year were allowed to vote, which was only 229,049 out of the 4 million population. The turnout rate was 95%.

== Background ==
Before 1935, all of the city councilors were appointed by the Japanese colonial government. Since 1921, many Taiwanese political groups, including the Taiwanese People's Party led by Chiang Wei-shui and the Taiwanese Alliance for Home Rule led by Lin Hsien-tang, asked for a Taiwanese council. The Japanese government did not accept, but held city council elections instead as a compromise.

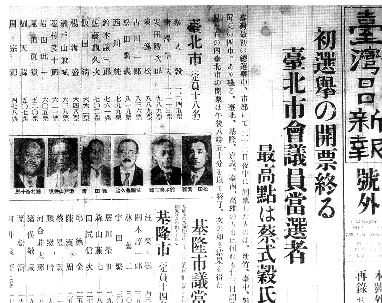
Newspaper showing the election results
