= Motherland controversy =

Incident in Japanese Taiwan

Chinese: 祖國支那事件; lit. 'Motherland Shina Event'
- Part of Taiwan under Japanese rule
- Lin Hsien-tang
- Native name: Abbreviated as 祖國事件, lit. 'Motherland Event', in Chinese
- Date: June 17, 1936
- Venue: Taichung Park
- Location: Taichung, Japanese Taiwan
- Outcome: Lin resigned from all his political and cultural positions

In 1936 on Taiwan under Japanese colonial rule, Taiwanese politician Lin Hsien-tang was publicly humiliated by a Japanese individual for referring to China as his motherland. The ensuing media backlash led Lin to resign from his political roles and relocate from Taiwan to Tokyo. Lin himself speculated that the Japanese military orchestrated the incident as a means of deterring Taiwanese intellectuals from embracing Chinese nationalist sentiments.

== Background ==
In March 1936, Lin Hsien-tang, a Taiwanese politician from the prominent Lin family of Wufeng, accompanied by his brother Lin Chi-tang and son Lin You-long, visited southern China on a trip arranged by the Taiwan People's News newspaper. Their itinerary included Xiamen, Fuzhou, Shantou, Hong Kong, Guangdong and Shanghai. During a welcome ceremony in Shanghai, Lin said:

Since I returned to the motherland twenty years ago, I have never returned to its borders again. The progress of the motherland has been rapid. This time, accompanied by others, I returned to the motherland and saw that the cultural development in cities such as Guangzhou and Shanghai can hardly be compared to what it was twenty years ago.

— Lin Hsien-tang

Hence, Lin referred to China as his "motherland" (Chinese: 祖國). This was subsequently reported to the head of the Japanese Army in Taiwan.

== Incident ==
Back on Taiwan, on 17 June 1936, Lin Hsien-tang attended a ceremony commemorating Japanese rule on Taiwan at Taichū Park at the invitation of the mayor of Taichū Prefecture. Uruma Zenbee (Japanese: 賣間善兵衛) publicly confronted Lin and asked:

Why did you say that you were back in the motherland when you were in the welcome ceremony held by chankoros?

Zenbee handed Lin a letter demanding his resignation from the position of legal consultant to the Governor and all other public roles, a public apology for his remarks in Shanghai, and a cessation of involvement in any political, cultural, or social activities. He proceeded to slap Lin.

Taiwan Daily News, along with other newspapers, reported on the event while attacking Lin. Due to overwhelming media pressure, Lin was forced to resign from the legal consultancy of the Government of colonial Taiwan, the Taiwanese Alliance for Home Rule, the Common Prosperity Association of East Asia and newspaper Taiwan Minbao, and moved to Tokyo with his complete family of 7.

Lin Hsien-tang, in his diary, posited that the confrontation was co-conspired by Rippei Ogisu, the military head of colonial Taiwan, and the Taiwan Daily News. His secretary, Yeh Jung-chung, also believed in Ogisu's involvement. However, in the following years, Lin did not make much of a fuss about retribution, and when Uruma came to his door to apologise, he did not scold him.

== See also ==
- Ethnic nationalism in Japan
  - Chinese nationalism in Taiwan
- Lin Hsien-tang
  - Colonial Taiwan and the Republic of China
  - Petition Movement for the Establishment of a Taiwanese Parliament
- Racism in Japan
  - Anti-Chinese sentiment in Japan
  - Anti-Taiwanese sentiment in Japan
