= Petition Movement for the Establishment of a Taiwanese Parliament =

Political movement in Japanese-ruled Taiwan

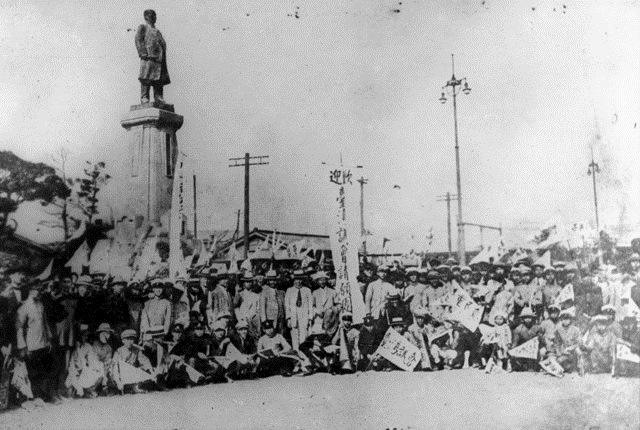
Petitioners from Taiwan in front of a railway station in Tōkyō, 1924

The Petition Movement for the Establishment of a Taiwanese Parliament (or alternatively translated ... Taiwan Representative Assembly, Taiwan Parliament Petition League Movement) was a political campaign during the first half of the 20th Century in the Japanese rule period. It was initiated by the New People Society, an organization founded by Taiwanese students studying in Japan, to advocate for the establishment of an autonomous parliament in Taiwan through petitions to the Japanese Imperial Diet. This movement marked a turning point for Taiwan's resistance against Japanese rule, shifting from armed resistance to modern-style political activism. It not only contributed to the development of the rule of law and the pursuit of constitutional values in Taiwan, but also influenced the Japanese government to introduce partial elections for half of the members of the Diet in 1935, initiating local autonomous governance in Taiwan.

The movement was led by Rin Kendō of the Taiwanese Cultural Association, who founded the League for the Establishment of a Formosan Parliament in 1923. The group delivered their last petition in 1934, without accomplishing their goal. Limited local elections were held in 1935. It was the longest political movement during the Japanese colonial period of Taiwan..

Its origins can be traced back to the "Law 63 Repealing Movement" in 1918. At that time, newspaper editor Lin Cheng-lu (林呈祿) believed that the authoritarian system established by the Law 63 undermined Taiwan's uniqueness and independence. Based on the spirit of Japanese constitutional politics, he proposed shifting the direction of the movement towards advocating for the establishment of a Taiwanese parliament to restore legislative authority to the people from the Taiwan Governor-General's Office.

Starting from January 30, 1921, when the first Petition for the Establishment of the Taiwan Parliament was submitted to the Imperial Diet, the movement lasted for 14 years and involved 15 petition submissions. The initial participants were primarily Taiwanese students in Tokyo. During the preparations for the third petition movement, the Taiwan Parliament Period Alliance (臺灣議會期成同盟會) was established. However, it was banned by Taiwan Governor-General Den Kenjiro due to concerns about its impact on social order, leading to the Incident of Security Maintenance (治警事件). Subsequently, the movement gained support from Japanese public opinion and sympathy from Taiwanese citizens, resulting in an increase in participants. However, after the dissolution of the Taiwanese People's Party in 1931 and the fascist suppression from the Japanese colonial government, the movement was officially terminated in 1934 due to the loss of supporting organizations.

== See also ==
- Great Petition
