= Taiwanese Communist Party =

Political party in Japanese-ruled Taiwan

Taiwanese Communist Party 臺灣共產黨
- Founded: 15 April 1928
- Banned: September 1931
- Succeeded by: Taiwan Provincial Working Committee of the Chinese Communist Party; Taiwan Democratic Self-Government League
- Headquarters: Taihoku (Taipei)
- Newspaper: Taiwan People Times; New Taiwan People Times; Guangming Bao
- Ideology: Communism; Marxism–Leninism; Taiwanese independence; Anti-imperialism
- Political position: Far-left
- National affiliation: Japanese Communist Party
- International affiliation: Comintern

Taiwanese Communist Party

Chinese name
- Traditional Chinese: 臺灣共產黨
- Simplified Chinese: 台湾共产党
Transcriptions
Standard Mandarin
- Hanyu Pinyin: Táiwān Gòngchǎndǎng
Wu
- Romanization: De^{平}uae^{平} Gon^{去}tshae^{上}taon^{上}
Yue: Cantonese
- Jyutping: Toi^{4}waan^{1} Gung^{6}caan^{2}dong^{2}
Southern Min
- Hokkien POJ: Tâi-oân Kiōng-sán Tóng

Japanese name
- Kyūjitai: 臺灣共產黨
- Shinjitai: 台湾共産党
Transcriptions
- Romanization: Taiwan Kyōsantō

The Taiwanese Communist Party (Kyūjitai: 臺灣共產黨; Shinjitai: 台湾共產党) was a revolutionary organization active in Japanese-ruled Taiwan. Like the contemporary Taiwanese People's Party, its existence was short, only three years, but its politics and activities were influential in shaping Taiwan's anti-colonial enterprise.

The party was subordinate to the Japanese Communist Party but advocated Taiwan's independence from Japan.

== Inception ==
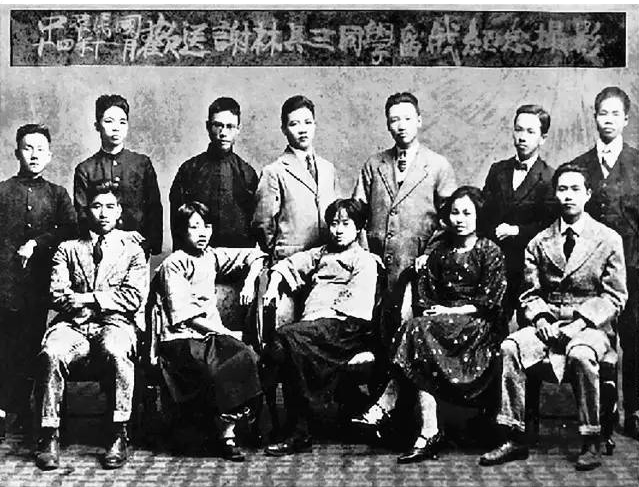
Shanghai French Concession, November 1925. Hsieh is in the front row, second from the right. Lin is on the last row, first from right.

The party was officially formed on 15 April 1928 in the Shanghai French Concession. Its planning went back to as early as 1925, when Moscow-trained Taiwanese students began to contact likeminded individuals in China and Japan. By late 1927, the Comintern had instructed Japanese communists, who had been organized since 1922, to draft political and organizational charters (綱領) for a "Japanese Communist Party, Taiwanese National Branch". Following the draft, Lin Mu-shun and Hsieh Hsueh-hung secretly met in Shanghai with seven others, three of whom represented the Chinese, Korean, and Japanese Communist Parties, respectively, to form the nascent organization. The TCP's first headquarters were located in the Shanghai French Concession.

In 1931, the Comintern elevated the group's status from party branch to that of a full-fledged party, which was directly answerable to it.

== Organization and ideology ==
The party advocated Taiwan's independence from Japanese rule. Politically, the party described the "Taiwanese nation" (臺灣民族, Taiwan minzu) as the descendants of Koxinga's army and later settlers from southeastern China. Both Koxinga and other Manchu rulers established a feudal system, which, in its view, began to disintegrate with the introduction of 19th-century Western capital into the island.

The Republic of Formosa represented a revolutionary movement of feudal landowners, merchants and radical patriots, but it was doomed to failure given the immaturity of the native capitalist class. It saw Taiwan's capitalism to be utterly dependent upon its Japanese counterpart.

The proletarian revolution would be driven by the contradiction between the dominant Japanese capital and the native (and poorly developed) capital and rural feudalistic elements. The goal of the party was to unite the workers and the peasants. Toward that goal, the party would use the left-leaning Taiwanese Cultural Association as a platform and legal front, and expose the "lies" of the Taiwanese People's Party, which had been moving toward the left under Chiang Wei-shui's leadership.

The 1928 charter subjected the organization of the Taiwanese communists to the Japanese party. Although Japanese communists had been entrusted with the task of guiding the Taiwanese branch, massive repression in Japan proper, starting in 1928, left the Taiwanese adrift. Some leftist students were also forced to return to Taiwan. Leadership fell to Hsieh Hsueh-hung to reorganize in light of that development.

== Activities ==
The party sought to organize workers in still-unorganized key industries, including the transportation and mining sectors in northern Taiwan. Party cadres were sent to work spread propaganda in the logging ranches of Giran and the mines in Kīrun, with mixed success. In Taihoku, the party led a failed strike by print workers. In the island's south, cadres sparked a strike by railroad workers in Takao. Overall, however, the TCP was neither as active nor as successful as the Alliance of Taiwanese Workers, which was affiliated with the Taiwanese People's Party.

The party had more success organizing peasants. Earlier, a bottom-up farmers' movement had spread rapidly in 1925, leading to the creation of the island-wide Taiwanese Peasants' Union. The TCP was able to cultivate its faction within the Union and by late 1928, the Union had openly declared its support for the communists. At that time, the Great Depression of 1930 was seen by many communists worldwide as a sign that the proletariat revolution was on the verge of exploding. Japan's war efforts in China had also bogged down. By 1931 the TCP-led Peasants' Union was secretly training farmers (many of Hakka ethnicity) in preparation for armed struggle to form a soviet, one that some believed would soon elicit support from the Chinese Communist Party. A leak allowed the authorities to liquidate a key group, halting that plan.

From its inception, the TCP had plans to infiltrate the Cultural Association, which was already left-leaning, after a group of moderate and conservative leaders had left in 1927. It was a convenient platform that could serve as a legal front. The third congress (1929) saw the communists succeed in electing several cadres to the association's central committee. They proceeded to purge the leadership of the remaining conservatives and non-TCP leftists, particularly Lien Wenqing.

Between 1931 and 1933, authorities arrested 107 TCP members, who were sentenced to prison terms of up to 15 years. A few died in prison.

== Factionalism ==
Initially, the party had been under the sway of the Japanese theorist Yamakawa Hitoshi, who advocated uniting the workers, peasants, and the petty bourgeoisie to form a mass party. The Comintern also initially favored communists uniting with "bourgeois forces" to wage an anti-imperialist war of national liberation. The TCP's 1931 charter, however, reflected new assessment that downplayed the revolutionary potential of the bourgeoisie. Class struggle was to be the priority. Hsieh, the leader until then, was opposed to the new turn. She and her supporters were forced out of the party.

== Post-World War II ==
There is no evidence that surviving members of the party managed to re-constitute the TCP after Japan's surrender to the Allied Forces. However, during the two years between 1945 and the aftermath of the February 28 Incident, some individual past members (most notably Hsieh Hsueh-hung) participated the anti-government action. The Kuomintang's repression led a part of them to flee to Mainland China, where they merged into the ranks of the Chinese Communist Party (CCP). Some of the survivors fled to British Hong Kong and formed the Taiwan Democratic Self-Government League in November 1947. Communist activities after the 1949 Nationalist retreat to Taiwan were thus directed under the auspices of the Chinese Communist Party. By that point, the Taiwan Provincial Working Committee of the Chinese Communist Party was particularly targeted, and by 1952 had been completely destroyed by the Kuomintang in Sanyi, Miaoli, and its leadership was incarcerated or executed during the White Terror.

The Labor Party was formed in 1989 and proclaims to have historical links to the Taiwanese Communist Party.

== Recent revival attempts ==
After the lifting of martial law in 1987, attempts have been made to re-establish a legal party of the same name. However, applications to the Ministry of the Interior were rejected on the grounds that Article 2 of the Civic Organization Law forbids civic organizations and activities from promoting communism. Later, the Labor Party was founded in 1989, which views itself as the ideological successor to the Taiwanese Communist Party.

On 20 July 2008, the Taiwan Communist Party was founded, the same day that the Taiwanese Constitutional Court ruled the prohibition of communism to be unconstitutional. The following year, two other parties were founded. On 31 March 2009, the Communist Party of the Republic of China was founded, and later that year, the Taiwan Democratic Communist Party was founded.

The Chinese Communist Party has shown no recent interest in promoting communism in Taiwan, and as of 2005, most of its efforts are directed at promoting Chinese nationalism on Taiwan, which has led to increasingly-warm relations with the Pan-Blue Coalition. Still, in 2000, Dai Chung, a Taiwanese resident, self-proclaimed a "Taiwan Province branch" of the CCP without applying for official status as a political party and without any support or interest from the CCP.

== See also ==
- Xie Xuehong
