= Straits Forum =

Forum between mainland China and Taiwan

The Straits Forum (simplified Chinese: 海峡论坛; traditional Chinese: 海峽論壇; pinyin: Hǎixiá Lùntán) is an annual forum for exchanges regarding cross-strait relations between the People's Republic of China and Taiwan held annually since 2009. It is organized by China's Taiwan Affairs Office and the Fujian Provincial People's Government.

== Forums ==
=== 1st Forum ===
The first Straits Forum was held in May 2009 in Xiamen and three other cities in Fujian. It introduced eight preferential policies, including building cross-strait common market activities and encouraging mainland tourists to visit Taiwan.

=== 2nd Forum ===
The second Straits Forum was held on 19–25 June 2010 in Xiamen and eight other regions in Fujian. The forum consisted of opening ceremony and evening party, policy discussion, cross-strait culture and art exchanges and public carnival. It was themed as expanding the communication among the public across the strait, strengthening the cross-strait cooperation and promoting mutual developments, aiming to construct a platform for cross-strait civil, economic and political exchanges. It saw more than 100 cooperation deals signing, mainly to promote people-to-people exchanges and aviation cooperation.

=== 3rd Forum ===
The third Straits Forum was held on 11–17 June 2011 in Xiamen, Fujian. The forum focused on grassroots exchanges across the Taiwan Strait. The forum included 13 activities, such as cross-strait folk stories, cultural exchanges and Taiwan temple fairs stage. There were also 15 sub-forums hosted by civil society group on both sides which focused on exchanges pertaining labor union, young people, women and folk beliefs and clan exchanges.

=== 4th Forum ===
The fourth Straits Forum was held on 16–22 June 2012 in Xiamen, Fujian opened by Jia Qinglin. The forum was themed expand civilian exchanges, boost cross-strait cooperation and promote common development. It featured cultural and economic exchanges, grassroots interactions and communication among people from all walks of life. Special workshops were held on the film and music, press and publication and martial arts sectors. Representatives from Taiwan grassroots farmer and fishermen's associations, congresses of rural citizens, grassroots judicial intermediary organs and community development associations for the first face-to-face communications with their mainland counterparts.

=== 5th Forum ===
The fifth Straits Forum was held on 16–21 June 2013 in Xiamen, Fujian. Mainland China boosted cross-strait exchanges by introducing a set of preferential policies in the field of legal rights, education, culture and tourism. An additional of 11 provincial entry-exit administration departments in mainland China will accept applications from Taiwanese who reside in the mainland for their entry permits renewal. The mainland will also open 10 more categories of professional qualification examinations to Taiwan residents, support Taiwan graduates from mainland colleges to start their own businesses and provide subsidies for entrepreneurship training to Taiwanese students. There would be 10 cultural exchanges bases set up in Henan, Fujian and Beijing. Another 11 historical sites would also play the role of cross-strait communication bases. A cross-strait copyright trade center and digital publication base working across the strait would be established in Fujian. Tourist from another 13 mainland cities will be eligible to visit Taiwan as individual tourists.

=== 6th Forum ===
The sixth Straits Forum was held in June 2014 in Xiamen, Fujian. The forum attracted more than 10,000 Taiwanese representatives from various sectors which participated in 18 major activities in different Fujian cities. The activities included the Matsu Culture Week in Putian which attracted more than 8,000 Matsu followers from Taiwan. Taiwanese who attended the forum including People First Party Secretary-General Chin Chin-sheng, New Party Chairman Yok Mu-ming, Non-Partisan Solidarity Union Chairman Lin Pin-kuan and representative of 22 municipality city and county governments.

=== 7th Forum ===
The seventh 7-day Straits Forum was held on 14–20 June 2015 in Xiamen, Fujian. The theme of the forum is Focusing on Youth and Serving the Community. During the forum, the Chairman of the Chinese People's Political Consultative Conference Yu Zhengsheng made an announcement to exempt Taiwanese from obtaining the travel permit in the future whenever they want to visit mainland China. The booklet-format travel permit will be changed to a card, resembling much like the Mainland Travel Permit for Hong Kong and Macao Residents. This is done to facilitate travel between the two sides of the Taiwan Strait. The policy was to go into effect by 1 July 2015.

=== 8th Forum ===
The eighth Straits Forum was held on 12 June 2016 in Xiamen, Fujian. The theme of the forum was expanding civil exchange, promoting integration development and promoting the sharing and mutual development in civil sectors in various social lives. The forum was opened by CPPCC Chairman Yu Zhengsheng and attended by Kuomintang Vice Chairman Jason Hu and New Party Chairman Yok Mu-ming, as well as 30 civil groups, 11 members of county and city leaders and speakers and 2,000 participants.

=== 9th Forum ===
The ninth Straits Forum started on 17 June 2017 in Fujian. The forum focused on broadening people-to-people exchanges and deepening integrated development.

=== 10th Forum ===
The tenth Straits Forum started on 4 June 2018 in Xiamen, Fujian. The forum focused on enhancing people-to-people interaction, economic exchanges and cultural integration across the strait. On 5 June 2018, a general conference was held. It was then followed by a series of activities for the entire week.

=== 11th Forum ===
The eleventh Straits Forum was held on 15–21 June 2019 in Beijing. It was hosted by CPPCC Chairman Wang Yang.

=== 12th Forum ===
Straits Forum in 2020

The twelfth Straits Forum was held on 20–25 September 2020 in Xiamen. CPPCC Chairman Wang Yang gave a video speech.

=== 13th Forum ===
The thirteenth Straits Forum was held on 10 December 2021 in Xiamen.

=== 14th Forum ===
The fourteenth Straits Forum was held on 12 July 2022 in Fujian.

=== 15th Forum ===
The fifteenth Straits Forum was held on 16 June 2023 in Fujian. It was attended by Kuomintang Vice Chairman Andrew Hsia.

=== 16th Forum ===
The sixteenth Straits Forum was held on 14 June 2024 in Xiamen, Fujian. The opening of the meeting was hosted by Taiwan Affairs Office Director Song Tao, while CPPCC Chairman Wang Huning gave an opening speech. The Kuomintang sent a delegation, led by Vice Chairman Sean Lien. The forum was also attended by Yunlin County Magistrate Chang Li-shan.

=== 17th Forum ===
The seventeenth Straits Forum began on 15 June 2025 in Xiamen, Fujian. Former Taiwanese president and Kuomintang chairman Ma Ying-jeou attended the forum. Ma asserted that the promotion of peaceful cross-strait ties is "a common desire of individuals on both sides of the Taiwan Strait"; Ma also expressed hope that cross-strait cooperation would deepen based on both sides' adherence to the 1992 Consensus and opposition to Taiwanese independence. CPPCC Chairman Wang Huning also participated in the event and presented a speech.

Ma's attendance was criticized by the Democratic Progressive Party (DPP), accusing Ma of "dancing in step with the Chinese Communists" and "undermining Taiwan's interests", with DPP legislator Chiu Chih-wei calling on Ma to be investigated by Taiwanese authorities for his comments. The Mainland Affairs Council in Taiwan further claimed that Ma's comments stood in contract to public sentiment and expressed regret over them. The Kuomintang, in response, accused the DPP of applying double standards, claiming that the DPP remains silent when its own politicians visit mainland China; executive director of the Ma Ying-jeou Foundation Hsiao Hsu-tsen further asserted that Ma's visit obeyed Taiwanese cross-strait law, and that the 1992 Consensus is "grounded in the Constitution of the Republic of China".

=== 18th Forum ===
The eighteenth Straits Forum will be held in Xiamen, Fujian, on 13 June 2026, under the theme of "Expanding people-to-people exchanges and deepening integrated development". The Kuomintang is expected to send a delegation led by Vice Chairman Chang Jung-kung.

Ahead of the conference, Taiwan's Mainland Affairs Council began rejecting travel permits for both central and local government officials, barring them from attending the forum, which spokesperson Liang Wen-chieh criticized as a "Chinese Communist Party united front platform". Members of the opposition Kuomintang would not be among the officials barred from attending.

== See also ==
- Cross-strait relations
- Cross-Strait Economic, Trade and Culture Forum
- Cross-Strait Peace Forum
