= All-China Federation of Taiwan Compatriots =

Chinese unification group

- 中华全国台湾同胞联谊会
- Formation: December 22, 1981; 44 years ago
- Type: People's organization
- Headquarters: No. 188 Chaonei Street, Dongcheng, Beijing
- President: Zheng Jianmin
- Party Secretary: Ji Bin
- Website: tailian.taiwan.cn

All-China Federation of Taiwan Compatriots
- Simplified Chinese: 中华全国台湾同胞联谊会
- Traditional Chinese: 中華全國台灣同胞聯誼會
Transcriptions
Standard Mandarin
- Hanyu Pinyin: Zhōnghuá Quánguó Táiwān Tóngbāo Liányìhuì

Abbreviation
- Simplified Chinese: 全国台联
- Traditional Chinese: 全國台聯
Transcriptions
Standard Mandarin
- Hanyu Pinyin: Quánguó Táilián

The All-China Federation of Taiwan Compatriots (ACFTC) is a people's organization composed mainly of Taiwanese residing in the People's Republic of China whose official aim is Chinese unification.

== History ==
The ACFTC was established on 22 December 1981 in Beijing. Since 1991, the National Society of Taiwan Studies, the All-China Federation of Taiwan Compatriots, and the Institute of Taiwan Studies have jointly hosted the Cross-Strait Relations Academic Seminar every year, referred to as the "Three Taiwan Forums."

Starting in 2017, the ACFTC took on a more prominent role in the CCP's united front efforts directed at Taiwan.

During the run-up to the 2024 Taiwanese presidential election, the ACFTC coordinated editorial attacks against presidential candidate Lai Ching-te, framing him as "pro-war". In 2024, Taiwan's Mainland Affairs Council banned its citizens from working at the ACFTC due to national security concerns.

== Organization ==
=== Presidents ===
1. Lin Liyun (December 1981 – May 1991)
2. Zhang Kehui (May 1991 – November 1997)
3. Yang Guoqing (November 1997 – January 2005)
4. Liang Guoyang (January 2005 – December 2012)
5. Wang Yifu (December 2012 – December 2017)
6. Huang Zhixian (December 2017 – December 2022)
7. Zheng Jianmin (December 2022 – Incumbent)

== See also ==
- Taiwan Affairs Office
