= Kong Lingzhi =

Chinese politician

Kong Lingzhi (孔令智; born February 1968) is a Chinese politician and a current vice chair of the Taiwan Democratic Self-Government League (TDSL), one of China's eight minor and non-oppositional political parties led by the Chinese Communist Party (CCP), since December 2022.

Kong was born in Changchun, Jilin, and has ancestry in Taichung, Taiwan. He joined the TDSL in December 1995. Since 1992, he has held local political and governmental positions in Jilin.

Kong was a delegate to the 11th and 12th National People's Congresses from 2008 to 2018, and has been a member of the National Committee of the Chinese People's Political Consultative Congress since 2018.
