= Great Petition =

1899 petition in Finland protesting the Russian Empire's policy of Russification

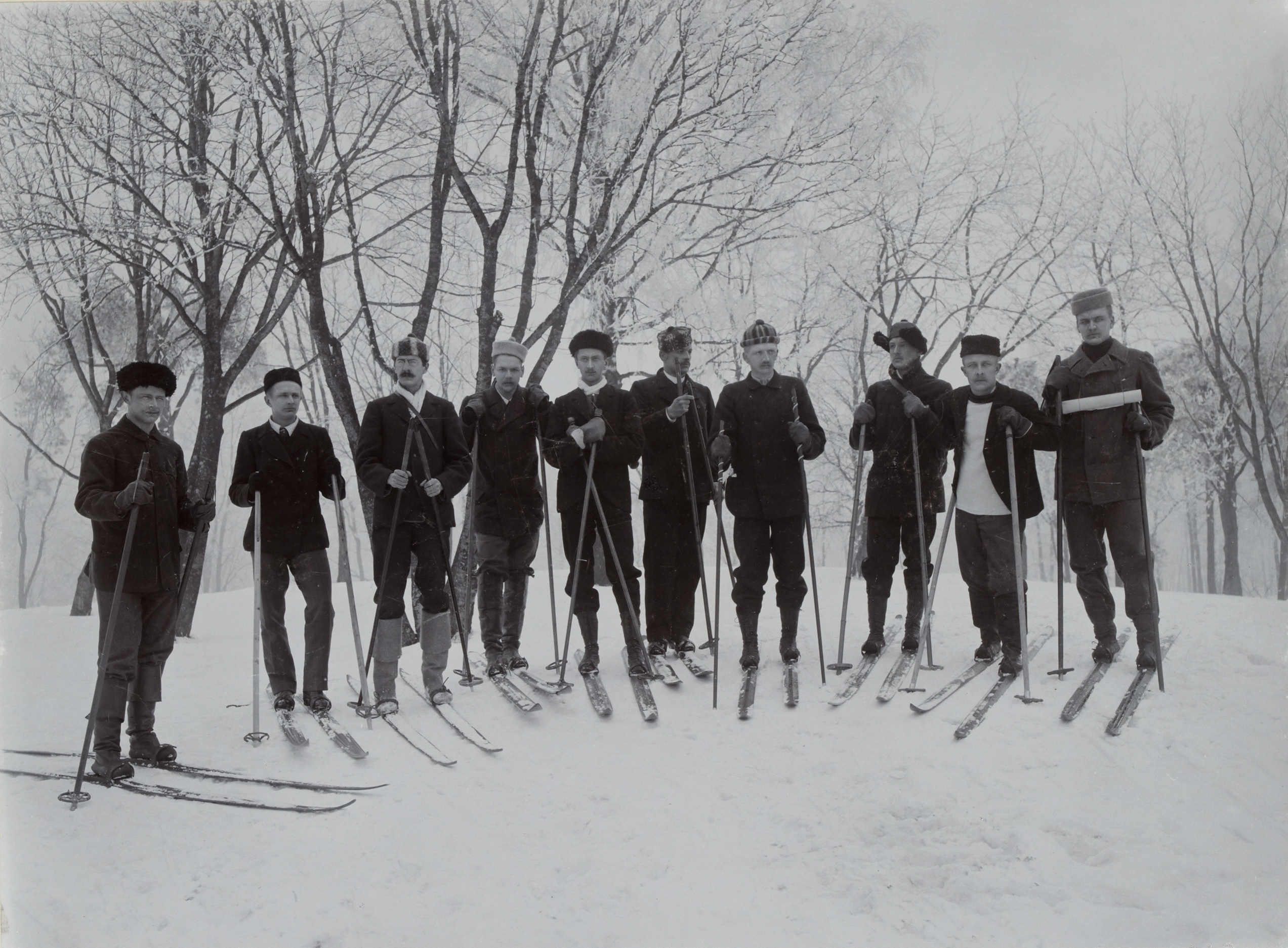
Nylands Nation gathering names for the Great Petition in 1899 (Eugen Schauman fourth from the right)

The Great Petition (Finnish: Suuri adressi, Swedish: Stora adressen) was a document produced in the Grand Duchy of Finland in 1899, during the first period of the Russification of Finland. It petitioned the Grand Duke of Finland, Tsar Nicholas II to reconsider his February Manifesto issued earlier in the same year. University students went from village to village to collect more than half a million signatures, roughly one fifth of the Finnish population at the time, within eleven days.

When the delegation, consisting of 500 men all around Finland, delivering the petition arrived in St Petersburg, the tsar declined to see it. Thus, it failed to have any effect.

== See also ==
- Kagal (Finnish resistance movement)
- Petition Movement for the Establishment of a Taiwanese Parliament
