= Lin Hsien-tang Residence Museum =

Museum in Wufeng, Taichung, Taiwan

- 林獻堂文物館
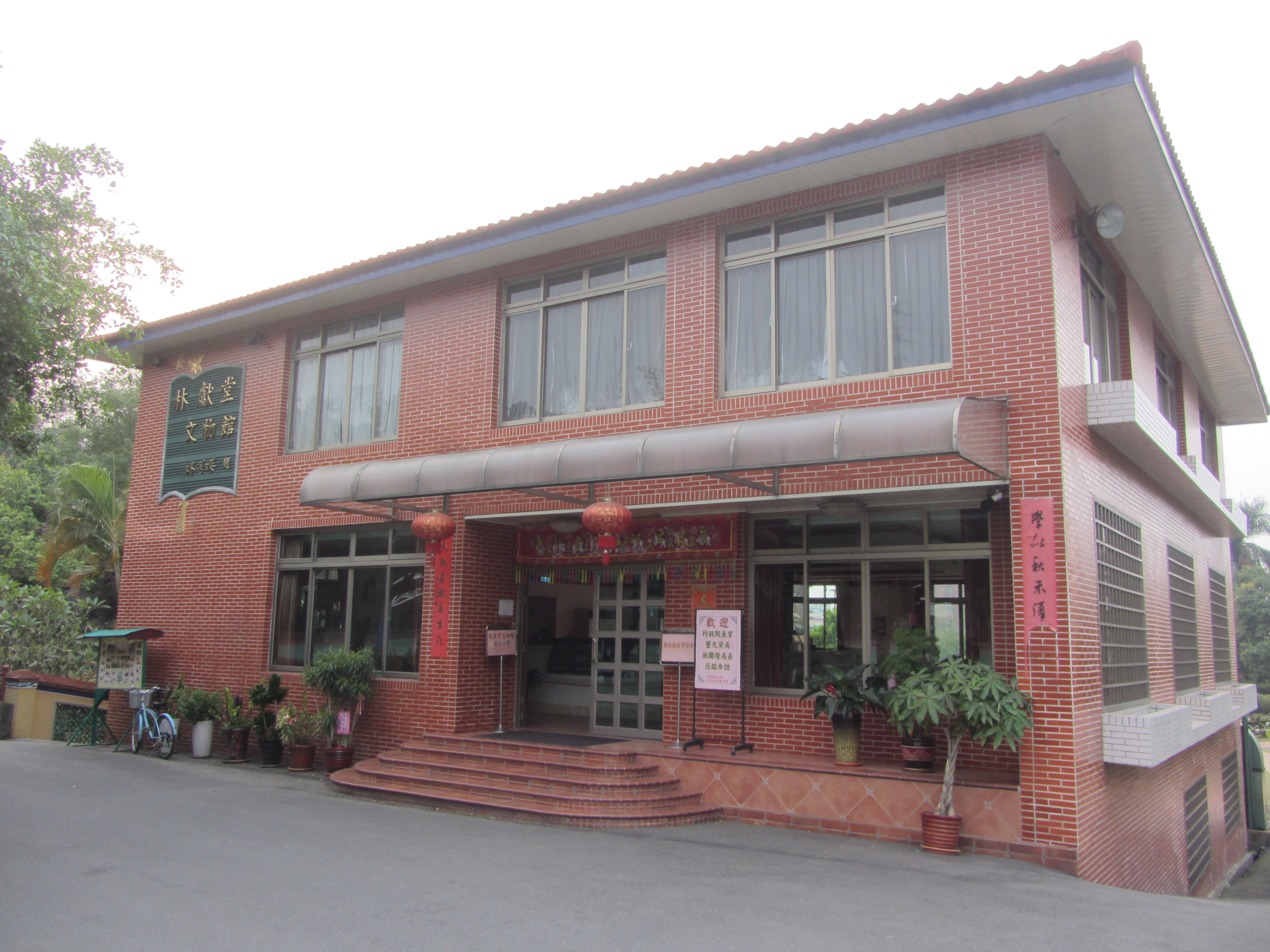
- Established: May 2019
- Location: Wufeng, Taichung, Taiwan
- Coordinates: 24°03′39.7″N 120°42′12.4″E
- Type: museum

The Lin Hsien-tang Residence Museum (traditional Chinese: 林獻堂文物館; simplified Chinese: 林献堂文物馆; pinyin: Línxiàntáng Wénwùguǎn) is a museum in Wufeng District, Taichung, Taiwan.

== History ==
The museum building used to be the residence of Lin Hsien-tang. The inner and outer wings of the construction of the first courtyard of the residence were completed in 1867. In 1883, the second courtyard was completed. The rear tower was completed in 1899. Lin Fang-ying, a descendant of Lin Hsien-tang's, opened the residence as a museum in May 2019.

== Architecture ==
The museum is located inside Mingtai High School compound.

== See also ==
- List of museums in Taiwan
