= Jiang Liping =

Chinese politician

Jiang Liping (江利平; born 1963) is a Chinese politician and a current vice chair of the Taiwan Democratic Self-Government League (TDSL), one of China's eight minor and non-oppositional political parties led by the Chinese Communist Party (CCP), since December 2022.

Jiang was born in Wuhan, Hubei, and has ancestry in Tainan, Taiwan. He joined the CCP in 1988 and later joined the TDSL in 2008. Between 1983 and 2022, Jiang held various local government and political positions in Hubei.

Jiang has been a member of the National Committee of the Chinese People's Political Consultative Conference (CPPCC) since 2013. He has also been a vice chair of the Hubei Committee of the CPPCC since January 2023.
