= Lin Liyun =

Chinese politician

- 林丽韫

President of the All-China Federation of Taiwan Compatriots
- In office December 1981 – May 1991
- Preceded by: Office established
- Succeeded by: Zhang Kehui

Personal details
- Born: 22 March 1933 (age 93) Kiyomizu Town, Taichū Prefecture, Taiwan
- Party: Chinese Communist Party
- Spouse: Huang Li (divorced)
- Children: 2
- Education: Peking University

Chinese name
- Simplified Chinese: 林丽韫
- Traditional Chinese: 林麗韞
Transcriptions
Standard Mandarin
- Hanyu Pinyin: Lín Lìyùn

Lin Liyun (Chinese: 林丽韫; born 22 March 1933) is a Chinese politician who served as president of the All-China Federation of Taiwan Compatriots from 1981 to 1991, vice chairperson of the National People's Congress Overseas Chinese Affairs Committee from 1991 to 1998, and vice president of the All-China Federation of Returned Overseas Chinese from 1994 to 2004.

She was a member of the Standing Committee of the 4th, 5th, 6th, 7th, 8th, and 9th National People's Congress. She was a member of the 10th, 11th, 12th, 13th, 14th and 15th Central Committee of the Chinese Communist Party.

== Biography ==
Lin was born in Kiyomizu Town, Taichū Prefecture, Taiwan (now Qingshui District of Taichung, Taiwan) on 22 March 1933, while her ancestral home in Jinjiang, Fujian. Her father Lin Shuiyong (林水永) was a businessman. In 1936, due to an earthquake, her family moved to Taipei, where she primarily studied at Taipei Yongle Elementary School. Four years later, her family emigrated to Kobe, Japan, where she lived for a total of 11 years. In school, she organized "Taiwanese Students' Association in Japan" and "Reading Association" with her classmates, and read Mao Zedong's On New Democracy and Edgar Snow's Red Star over China and other works, which made her feel good about the Chinese Communist Party.

In July 1952, Lin came to mainland China via British Hong Kong and was admitted to the Department of Biology, Peking University. Beginning in 1953, she served in several posts in the International Liaison Department of the Chinese Communist Party, including graduate student, deputy director, and director. After the Cultural Revolution, in October 1978, she was promoted to become vice president of the All-China Women's Federation and secretary of its secretariat. Lin was president of the All-China Federation of Taiwan Compatriots in December 1981, and held that office until December 1991, when she was chosen as vice chairperson of the National People's Congress Overseas Chinese Affairs Committee. She also served as vice president of the All-China Federation of Returned Overseas Chinese from June 1994 to August 2004.

In September 2007, Lin became dean of the School of Foreign Languages, Nankai University, a post she kept until September 2011.

== Personal life ==
Lin was married to Huang Li (黄理), with whom she has a son and a daughter.

== Contributions ==
Since the 1950s, Lin has worked as a Japanese interpreter for Mao Zedong, Liu Shaoqi, Zhou Enlai, Zhu De, Deng Xiaoping and other party and state leaders, and participated in the negotiation of the establishment of diplomatic relations between China and Japan in 1972.

Civic offices
| New title | President of the All-China Federation of Taiwan Compatriots; 1981–1991 | Succeeded by Zhang Kehui |
