= Lin Shengzhong =

Chinese politician (1942–2011)

Lin Shengzhong

Lin Shengzhong (林盛中; January 1942 – 9 December 2011) was a Chinese politician who served as the chair of the Taiwan Democratic Self-Government League (TDSL), one of China's eight minor and non-oppositional political parties led by the Chinese Communist Party (CCP), from 1987 to 1988.

== Biography ==
Lin was born in January 1942, in Taipei, and graduated from National Taiwan University in 1964 with a degree in geology. He then received a doctorate in the same subject from Brown University in 1971.

In 1972, Lin decided to go to mainland China rather than returning to Taiwan. In an essay posted to the website of the Taiwan Scholar Association (台湾同学会), Lin wrote that he had accepted Marxism while involved in the Baodiao movement in the United States. In addition, he wrote that he saw the Kuomintang, Taiwan's then-ruling party, as corrupt and oppressive, and that his cultural background was incompatible with that of the US.

In China, Lin held multiple geology research positions, but his work in the field was initially disrupted due to the Cultural Revolution. He joined the TDSL in 1978, and in 1981 he became the first president of the Taiwan Scholar Association.

During the presidency of Chen Shui-bian in Taiwan from 2000 to 2008, Lin was quoted in Chinese and international media commenting on Chen's proposal to hold a referendum on Taiwanese independence, and on Taiwanese politics more generally.

Lin was a member of the Chinese People's Political Consultative Conference (CPPCC) from 1978 until his death in 2011. In 2007, the South China Morning Post quoted him as saying that the space for free expression of ideas within the CPPCC had decreased since former CCP General Secretary Zhao Ziyang was removed from power following the Tiananmen Square massacre in 1989.

== Personal life and death ==
Lin married in 1976 and had at least one child.

Lin died on 9 December 2011, in Beijing, aged 70, after an unspecified illness.
