= Chen Yunying =

Chinese educator

- 陈云英
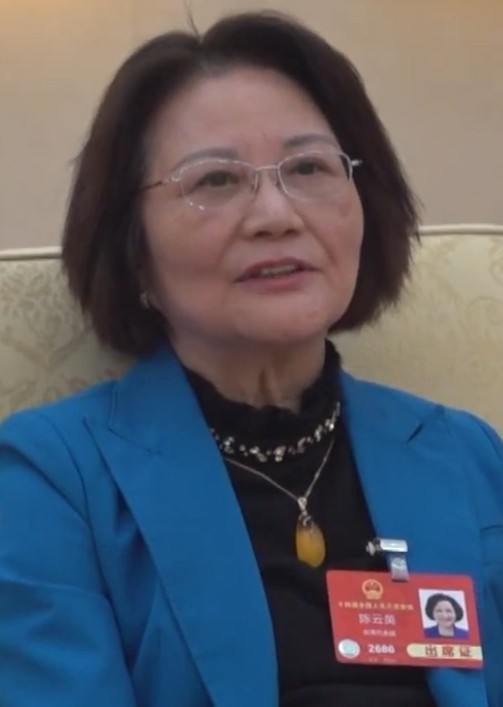
- Chen in 2025

Delegate to the National People's Congress
- Incumbent
- Assumed office 2003

Personal details
- Born: February 1953 (age 73) Taipei, Republic of China
- Citizenship: ROC (before 1987); PRC (after 1987)
- Party: Chinese Communist Party
- Spouse: Justin Yifu Lin
- Children: 2
- Occupation: Politician, educator

Chen Yunying (simplified Chinese: 陈云英; traditional Chinese: 陳雲英; pinyin: Chén Yúnyīng; born February 1953) is a Chinese educator and politician. She is a representative of the National People's Congress for Taiwan Province and the wife of Justin Yifu Lin. She also is a researcher at the China National Academy of Educational Sciences.

== Early life and education ==
Chen was born into a merchant family in Taipei, Taiwan. She enrolled in the Department of Chinese Literature at National Chengchi University, where she earned dual bachelor's degrees in literature and education. During her third year, she met Justin Yifu Lin, whom she married in 1975. From 1976 to 1977, she taught at Nan'an National High School in Yilan, Taiwan. Between 1977 and 1983, she served as a teacher at Yilan Senior Commercial Vocational School.

In 1983, Chen moved to the United States where she pursued a master's degree in education at Edinboro University, completing it in 1984. She then earned a doctorate in education from George Washington University between 1984 and 1987. During this period, she reunited with her husband Lin, who was pursuing a doctorate in economics at the University of Chicago. Lin had defected to China in 1979 by swimming from Kinmen Island, where he served as a company commander in the Republic of China Army, to Xiamen. In 1986, Chen served as an assistant to the director of the Arlington Education Bureau in Washington.

== Career ==
In 1987, Chen relocated to Beijing with her children to join her husband. She became the first person in the People's Republic of China to hold a doctorate in special education. She joined the Central Institute of Educational Sciences, where she established and led the Special Education Research Office. Chen conducted extensive fieldwork on the education of children with disabilities in cities in regions such as Beijing, Tianjin, Jiangsu, Shanxi, Shandong, and Liaoning. She advocated for experimental special education curricula, trained teachers, and promoted the inclusion of intellectually disabled children in mainstream classrooms.

In 1989, Chen edited the Special Education Reference Series. She also served as a standing committee member of the All-China Youth Federation and editor-in-chief of Chinese Journal of Special Education. From 1998, she was the vice-chair of the Special Education Branch of the Chinese Society of Education. In 1992, the State Council of China recognized her as an expert with outstanding contributions to educational research, granting her a special government allowance.

=== Political career ===
Chen was elected as a deputy representing Taiwan Province to the 10th National People's Congress in 2003. She was later elected to the 13th National People's Congress on February 24, 2018, and to the 14th National People's Congress on January 18, 2023. In 2019, she visited Taiwan at the invitation of the National Dong Hwa University in Hualien, Taiwan as part of academic exchange activities. During an open session of the Taiwan delegation at the second meeting of the 14th National People's Congress in 2024, Chen criticized what she refers to as Taiwan's "de-Sinicization" education policies, noting that they have led many young voters in Taiwan to reject their Chinese identity. She called for enhanced patriotic education for Taiwanese youth and emphasized that cross-strait exchanges would continue to grow, normalize, and intensify.

== Personal life ==
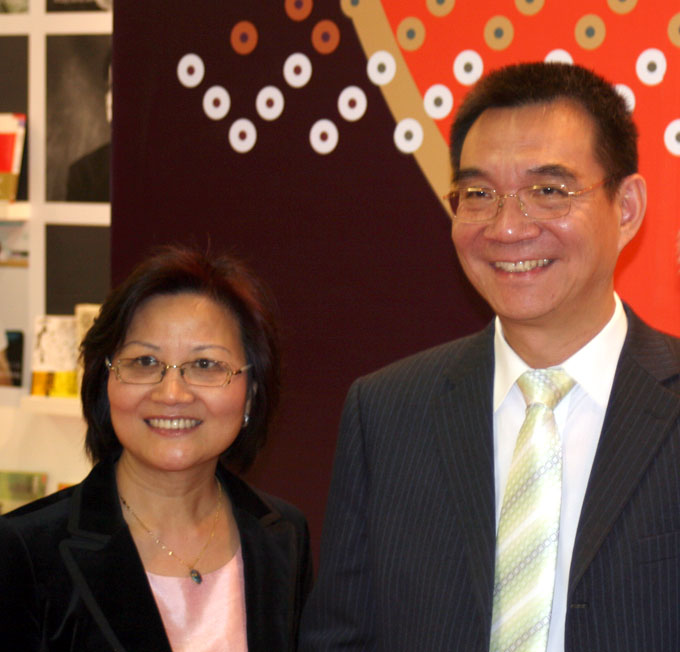
Chen and her husband at the Frankfurt Book Fair 2009

Chen and her husband Justin Lin have two children. Their son currently serves as the general manager of Guangzhou Industrial Investment Fund Management Co., Ltd. and vice president of the Taiwan Compatriots Association of Guangdong Province.

== Works ==
Some of Chen's major works include:

- Parents' Guide to Special Needs Children (Chinese: 特殊儿童父母指导手册; pinyin: Tèshū értóng fùmǔ zhǐdǎo shǒucè)
- Educational Diagnosis of Children with Disabilities (Chinese: 残疾儿童的教育诊断; pinyin: Cánjí értóng de jiàoyù zhěnduàn)
- Foundations of Special Education in China (Chinese: 中国特殊教育学基础; pinyin: Zhōngguó tèshū jiàoyù xué jīchǔ)
- Shared Handbook on Inclusive Education (Chinese: 全纳教育共享手册; pinyin: Quán nà jiàoyù gòngxiǎng shǒucè)
- Mental Retardation - Psychological Education Rehabilitation (Chinese: 智力落后——心理教育康复; pinyin: Zhìlì luòhòu——xīnlǐ jiàoyù kāngfù)
- Curriculum and Teaching for Mental Retardation (Chinese: 智力落后课程与教学; pinyin: Zhìlì luòhòu kèchéng yǔ jiàoxué)
- Experiments in Inclusive Education: Successful Experiences in Rural Areas (Chinese: 随班就读的实验——农村成功的经验; pinyin: Suí bān jiùdú de shíyàn——nóngcūn chénggōng de jīngyàn)
