= Formosan League for Reemancipation =

Taiwan independence organization

- Traditional Chinese: 台灣再解放聯盟
- Simplified Chinese: 台湾再解放联盟
Transcriptions
Standard Mandarin
- Hanyu Pinyin: Táiwān Zàijiěfàng Liánméng
Southern Min
- Hokkien POJ: Tâi-oân Chài-kái-hòng Liân-bêng

The Formosan League for Reemancipation was the first organization supportive of the Taiwan independence movement to be established outside the island of Taiwan after World War II. It was founded on 28 February 1948 in Hong Kong. Huang Chi-nan and Thomas Liao founded the organization after Thomas's brother Joshua had been arrested during the February 28 Incident of 1947 by authorities in Shanghai. Upon his release from prison, Joshua was entrusted with responsibility of coordinating the actions of FLR members in Nanking and Shanghai. Thomas oversaw FLR activists based in Japan, Hong Kong, and Taiwan. The organization maintained direct contact with government officials in the United States and the Philippines. The Central Intelligence Agency collected information on the FLR.

The league submitted a petition to the United Nations on 1 September 1948, asking the intergovernmental organization to take control of Taiwan's sovereignty and administration, thereby removing the Kuomintang from power. In 1949, Liao, as the league's leader, called for the Supreme Commander for the Allied Powers to occupy Formosa and the Pescadores. After the Kuomintang left Taiwan, the FLR planned to pursue one of four options for Taiwan: full independence, a UN trusteeship, US trusteeship, or a return to Japanese rule. To suppress dissent, the Kuomintang government in Taiwan jailed members of FLR and the World United Formosans for Independence. Thomas Liao moved from Hong Kong to Manila, and later Japan, in 1950, where he eventually established the Republic of Taiwan Provisional Government.
