= National Society of Taiwan Studies =

Organization of China

- 全国台湾研究会
- Formation: August 16, 1988; 38 years ago
- Headquarters: Beijing
- Region served: China

The National Society of Taiwan Studies (NSTS) is a non-governmental academic organization in the People's Republic of China composed of scholars, related personnel, and groups engaged in research on Taiwan and cross-strait relations. Its current address is on the fourth floor of Building B, Tsinghua Tongfang Building, Shuangqing Road, Haidian District, Beijing.

== History ==
On August 16, 1988, the Taiwan Research Association (later known as the National Taiwan Research Association) was established. Its purpose was to build a platform for exchange for experts and scholars engaged in the study of Taiwan issues and cross-strait relations on both sides of the Taiwan Strait and at home and abroad, to promote academic activities, enhance exchanges, friendship and cooperation among scholars, and promote the peaceful development of cross-strait relations and the Chinese unification.

Since 1991, the National Taiwan Studies Association, the All-China Federation of Taiwan Compatriots and the Institute of Taiwan Studies habe jointly hosted the "Cross-Strait Relations Academic Symposium" every year, referred to as the "Three-Taiwan Conference". The 27th session in 2018 has never been cancelled. On October 11–12, 2013, the 21st Century Foundation and the National Taiwan Studies Association hosted the first "Cross-Strait Peace Forum".

== Organization ==
The highest authority of the National Taiwan Studies Association is the General Assembly of Members. The council is the executive body of the General Assembly of Members. The Standing Council is elected by the council and exercises some of the powers of the council during the recess of the council and is responsible to the council. The Association has a President, Vice Presidents and Secretary-General, among whom the Secretary-General is the legal representative of the Association.
