= Fu Zhiguan =

Chinese politician

Fu Zhiguan (符之冠; born May 1965) is a Chinese politician and a current vice chair of the Taiwan Democratic Self-Government League (TDSL), one of China's eight minor and non-oppositional political parties led by the Chinese Communist Party (CCP), since December 2022.

Fu was born in Haikou, Hainan, and has ancestry in Yilan County, Taiwan. He studied biology at Hainan Normal University from 1984 to 1987. Fu joined the TDSL in June 1993, and the CCP in December 1994. He was a middle school teacher in Haikou from 1987 to 1991, and has since held local government positions in Hainan.

Fu was a delegate to the 12th and 13th National People's Congresses from 2013 to 2023, and has been a member of the National Committee of the Chinese People's Political Consultative Congress since 2023. He was also a delegate to the 19th National Congress of the Chinese Communist Party in 2017.
