= Thomas Liao =

Taiwanese independence activist (1910–1986)

- 廖文毅
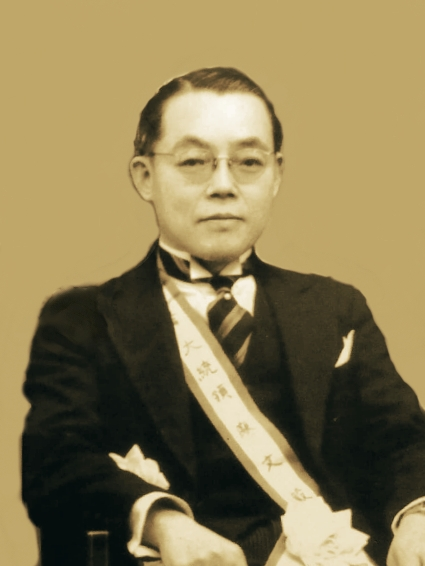
- Born: 廖溫義; 22 March 1910; Seira, Kobi, Tainan Prefecture, Japanese Taiwan
- Died: 9 May 1986 (aged 76)
- Education: University of Nanking (BS); University of Michigan (MS); Ohio State University (PhD)

Thomas Liao (22 March 1910 – 9 May 1986) was a Taiwanese independence activist and founding leader of the Republic of Taiwan Provisional Government.

== Early life, education, and military service ==
Thomas Liao was born in present-day Xiluo, Yunlin County, on 22 March 1910, to a wealthy Presbyterian family of Hakka descent. His birth name 廖溫義; Liào Wēnyì; Liāu Un-gī was later changed to 廖文毅; Liào Wényì; Liāu Bûn-gē. Liao finished his secondary education in Kyoto, Japan, then enrolled at the University of Nanking to study mechanical engineering. Liao earned graduate degrees in the United States, completing a master's at the University of Michigan and a doctorate in chemical engineering at Ohio State University. He married an American, and his children were raised in the United States. After obtaining his Ph.D. in 1935, Liao taught at National Chekiang University. Soon after the Second Sino-Japanese War began, Liao joined the National Revolutionary Army Ordnance Corps with the rank of colonel.

== Political career and activism ==
Liao returned to Taiwan in 1940, and became a businessman. In 1945, he began working for the Kuomintang within Taipei City Government, as director of the municipal bus system and the city's Public Works Bureau. He stood for election to the National Political Assembly in 1946. Free China Review reported that Liao tied with three other candidates after one of his votes was invalidated due to the presence of an "ink stain". Liao lost after lots were drawn.

Thomas and his elder brother Joshua Liao pushed for Taiwan to be governed by "effective constitutional administration" in 1946, and by January 1947, Thomas had written about a Federated States of China, in which Taiwan was granted full autonomy. Alongside Wang Tien-teng, Thomas Liao stood for election to the Constituent National Assembly in 1947. Constitutionalism was a tenet of his campaign. George H. Kerr wrote in Formosa Betrayed that the Kuomintang nullified his election because too many Liao ballots were marked with "imperfect calligraphy". Liao left for Hong Kong later that year, after his brother had been arrested in the aftermath of the 228 Incident. Liao and Huang Chi-nan founded the Formosan League for Reemancipation one year after the incident. Liao later moved to Manila, then Tokyo, in 1950. Liao later founded the Taiwan Democratic Independence Party in Kyoto. On 1 September 1955, he convened the Provisional Congress of the Republic of Formosa in Japan. Liao was subsequently elected president of the Republic of Taiwan Provisional Government on 28 February 1956. That same day, Liao issued a declaration of independence for Taiwan.

In 1964, the Kuomintang identified an underground branch of Liao's Formosan Democratic Independence Party in Taiwan, then sentenced his mother to prison, and his nephew Liao Shih-hao to death. With his family under threat, Liao returned to Taiwan on 14 May 1965, stating, "I, Thomas Liao have been working for the interests and happiness of the Taiwanese people overseas for almost 20 years ... But now I recognize from the bottom of my heart that the biggest threat is the infiltration and subversion by the Chinese Communists. Thus, I have renounced my Taiwanese independence activities and have decided to answer the call from President Chiang's Anti-Communist Union, and hereby pledge to do everything within my power to fight for the great cause of defeating the Communists." Chiang Kai-shek granted Liao a full pardon. Shortly after his return, Liao was named founding director of the graduate school of chemical engineering at the College of Chinese Culture by Chang Ch'i-yun.

== Death and legacy ==
Liao died on 9 May 1986.

Liao's granddaughter Kim Liao searched for stories and information about him, having never learned about him growing up in the United States, and wrote about him and her grandmother Anna in Where Every Ghost Has a Name: A Memoir of Taiwanese Independence (Rowman & Littlefield, 2024).
