= Cross-Strait Economic, Trade and Culture Forum =

Forum between Mainland China and Taiwan

- Traditional Chinese: 兩岸經貿文化論壇
- Simplified Chinese: 两岸经贸文化论坛
- Literal meaning: Cross-Strait Trade Culture Forum
Transcriptions
Standard Mandarin
- Hanyu Pinyin: liǎng'àn jīngmào wénhuà lùntán
Yue: Cantonese
- Jyutping: loeng5 ngon6 ging1 mau6 man4 faa3 leon6 taan4

Alternative Chinese name
- Traditional Chinese: 國共論壇
- Simplified Chinese: 国共论坛
- Literal meaning: KMT CPC Forum
Transcriptions
Standard Mandarin
- Hanyu Pinyin: Guógòng Lùntán
Yue: Cantonese
- Jyutping: guo2 gong3 lun4 tan2

Cross-Strait Economic, Trade and Culture Forum, commonly known as the Kuomintang–Chinese Communist Party Forum (KMT–CCP Forum), is an event jointly organized by the Kuomintang (KMT) and the Chinese Communist Party (CCP). It was originally proposed by the Kuomintang and the CCP in 2005, jointly organized in order to promote cross-strait economic, trade, cultural exchanges dialogue and integration.

== Background ==
The increased contacts culminated in the 2005 Pan-Blue visits to mainland China, including a meeting between CCP General Secretary Hu Jintao and KMT Chairman Lien Chan in April 2005. They were hailed as the highest level of exchange between the Chinese Communist Party and the Kuomintang since Chiang Kai-shek and Mao Zedong met in Chongqing on 28 August 1945.

Both Kuomintang-Chinese Communist Party hold on the premise of acknowledging the 1992 Consensus, encourage the reopening of talks across the strait. Encourage cooperation in economic exchange and crime fighting, push for two-way direct flights across the strait, Three Links, and agricultural exchange.

== History ==
Sequence	Date	Venue City	Venue Province	Theme/Remark
1st	14–15 April 2006	Beijing		The mainland China announced new incentives to promote cross-strait trade. Participants also passed joint proposals for closer economic ties.
2nd	16–18 October 2006	Bo'ao	Hainan	Boost agricultural cooperation and promote peace and development across the Taiwan Strait.
3rd	28–29 April 2007	Beijing		Encouraged to expand cooperation with mainland counterpart.
4th	20–21 December 2008	Shanghai		Expanding cross-Straits cooperation in the finance and service sectors, encouraging two-way investment and regularizing economic exchanges, which cover the key points of deepening cross-strait economic exchange and cooperation.
5th	11–12 July 2009	Changsha	Hunan	Promote cultural exchanges and educational cooperation across the Taiwan Strait.
6th	8–11 July 2010	Guangzhou	Guangdong	Strengthening cooperation in emerging industries and boosting the competitiveness of both sides.
7th	6–8 May 2011	Chengdu	Sichuan	
8th	28–29 July 2012	Harbin	Heilongjiang	
9th	26–27 October 2013	Nanning	Guangxi	Promote Exchange and Cooperation, Revitalize the Chinese nation.
10th	3 May 2015	Shanghai		
11th	2–3 November 2016	Beijing		Held as Cross-Strait Peaceful Development Forum.
12th	3 February 2026	Beijing		Prospects for Cross-Strait Exchanges and Cooperation

== See also ==
- Relations between the Kuomintang and the Chinese Communist Party
- Cross-Strait relations
- Cross-Strait Peace Forum
- Three Links
- Political status of Taiwan
- One Country on Each Side
- Pan-Blue Coalition
- First United Front
- Second United Front
- History of Cross-Strait Relations
