= Zheng Jianmin =

Chinese politician

Zheng Jianmin (郑建闽; born May 16, 1965) is a Chinese politician and a current vice chair of the Taiwan Democratic Self-Government League (TDSL), one of China's eight minor and non-oppositional political parties led by the Chinese Communist Party, since December 2017.

Zheng was born in Taining, Fujian, and has ancestry in Taipei, Taiwan. He received a master's degree in geography from Fujian Normal University in 1989, and a doctorate in the same subject from East China Normal University in 1996. From 1996 to 2018, Zheng held multiple local political positions in Fujian.

From 2018 to 2023, Zheng was a vice governor of Fujian. He was also a member of the standing committee of the National Committee of the Chinese People's Political Consultative Conference from 2013 to 2023, and has been a member of the standing committee of the 14th National People's Congress since 2023. Since December 2022, Zheng has also been the chair of the All-China Federation of Taiwan Compatriots.
