= Chiang Wei-shui =

Taiwanese politician (1891–1931)

- 蔣渭水
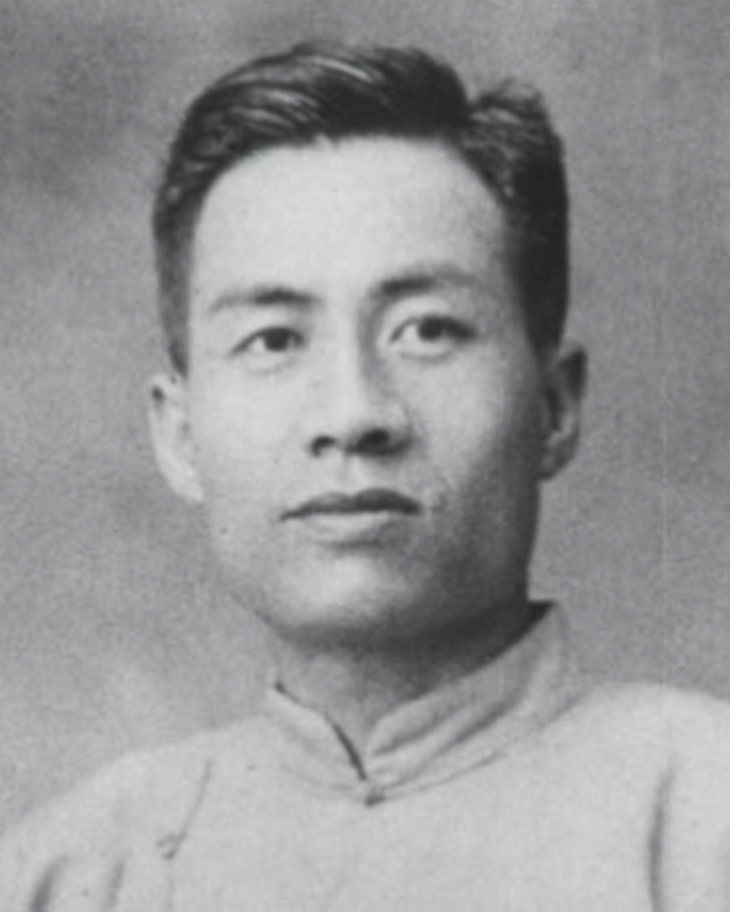
- Born: August 6, 1890; Gilan District (modern-day Yilan County), Taipeh Prefecture, Taiwan, Qing Dynasty
- Died: August 5, 1931 (aged 40); Taihoku City, Taihoku Prefecture, Japanese Taiwan
- Education: National Taiwan University
- Known for: Founding the Taiwanese Cultural Association and the Taiwanese People's Party
- Relatives: Chiang Wei-chuan (brother)

Chinese name
- Traditional Chinese: 蔣渭水
- Simplified Chinese: 蒋渭水
Transcriptions
Standard Mandarin
- Hanyu Pinyin: Jiǎng Wèishǔi
- Wade–Giles: Chiang Wei-shui
Southern Min
- Hokkien POJ: Chiúⁿ Ūi-súi
- Tâi-lô: Tsiúnn Ūi-súi

Japanese name
- Kyūjitai: 蔣渭水
Transcriptions
- Romanization: Shō Isui

Chiang Wei-shui (Chinese: 蔣渭水; Pe̍h-ōe-jī: Chiúⁿ Ūi-súi; 6 August 1890 – 5 August 1931) was a Taiwanese physician and activist. He was a founding member of the Taiwanese Cultural Association and the Taiwanese People's Party. He is seen as one of the most important figures in Taiwan's resistance movement against Japanese rule.

He once wrote a short essay on Taiwan called Certificate of Bedside Diagnosis or Certificate of Clinical Diagnosis (臨床講義) about how the patient (Taiwan) suffered from severe culture malnutrition. Written in the form of a medical examination, it is his most famous work.

== Biography ==
=== Early life and education ===
Chiang was born in Yilan during the Qing Dynasty rule. At the age of 10 he began to study with a Confucian scholar (張鏡光). In 1915 he graduated from the Taiwan Medical College (now the National Taiwan University College of Medicine). Around 1919 he married Chen Tian. He established the Taian Hospital (大安醫院) in Daitōtei, a district in today's Taipei and he also called on other intellectuals to come to the hospital and hold joint lectures.

He founded the Taian Hospital (大安醫院) in Daitōtei, a district in modern-day Taipei, and invited fellow intellectuals to the hospital to discuss contemporary affairs. Before he established the hospital, he worked shortly as a surgical assistant at Yilan Hospital.

=== Political activism ===
In 1920 he began participating in the movement to found the Taiwan Assembly. In 1921 he helped found the Taiwan Cultural Association. While the Taiwanese Cultural Association was active in promoting lectures, publications, and other cultural activities, Chiang was one of its central figures. This was during Japanese colonial rule. He was imprisoned for four months in 1923 and again in 1925 for his opposition to the Japanese colonial government. During this time, Chen Tian would lecture in his stead, continuing the promotion of his ideas. In total, Chiang was imprisoned twelve times.

In 1927, the Taiwan Cultural Association split because of an internal ideological division between rightists and leftists. Chiang went on to help found the Taiwanese People's Party on a platform of unity. The Taiwan People's Party was the first legal party to be founded in Taiwan. Chiang was also involved with the League of Taiwanese Laborers and the Taiwan Peasant's Union. He came under criticism from rightists in the government. When Chhoà Pôe-hóe, Ia̍p Êng-cheng and others prepared for the formation of the Taiwanese Alliance for Home Rule, Chiang expelled them. The Taiwan People's Party contacted the League of Nations several times to protest Japanese issuance of special permits for opium sale as well as the Musha Incident. All of these were happening during the Japanese colonial period. People’s political movements, their cultural and linguistic promotion, and the struggle of identity were all combined with anti-colonial resistance.

The Taiwanese People's Party's political philosophy was the Three Principles of the People, but Hsieh Chun-mu and others pushed for a revolutionary line. Recent scholarship, however, suggests a stronger connection between Chiang's activism and the international Marxist and leftist movements of his time, particularly the influences of Lenin.

=== Death and funeral ===
In 1931, the colonial administration forced the dissolution of the party. Chiang died of typhoid that same year, at the age of 40 (41 by traditional Chinese reckoning). Since typhoid was considered to be a highly infectious disease, his remains were cremated the day he passed away. On 23 August 1931, three weeks after his death, over 5,000 mourners marched from Dadaocheng to Yuanshan, where he was buried. Smaller marches in commemoration of Chiang took place across Taiwan, including one in Taichung organized by Lin Hsien-tang and Yang Chao-chia. Lo Chia-hui characterizes the funeral as a political ceremony of metropolitan scale in colonial Taiwan; various organizations seriously debated the semantic problem of a “public funeral,” and Japanese police largely monitored and even regulated the event.

Writing in the 1970s in the context of the nativist and tangwai movements, Huang Huang-hsiung described Chiang as Taiwan's Sun Yat-sen.

His grave was located in Taipei Public Cemetery No. 6, on Chongde St., near Liuzhangli Station, until October 2015, when his remains were moved to Cherry Blossom Cemetery in Yilan.

== Legacy ==
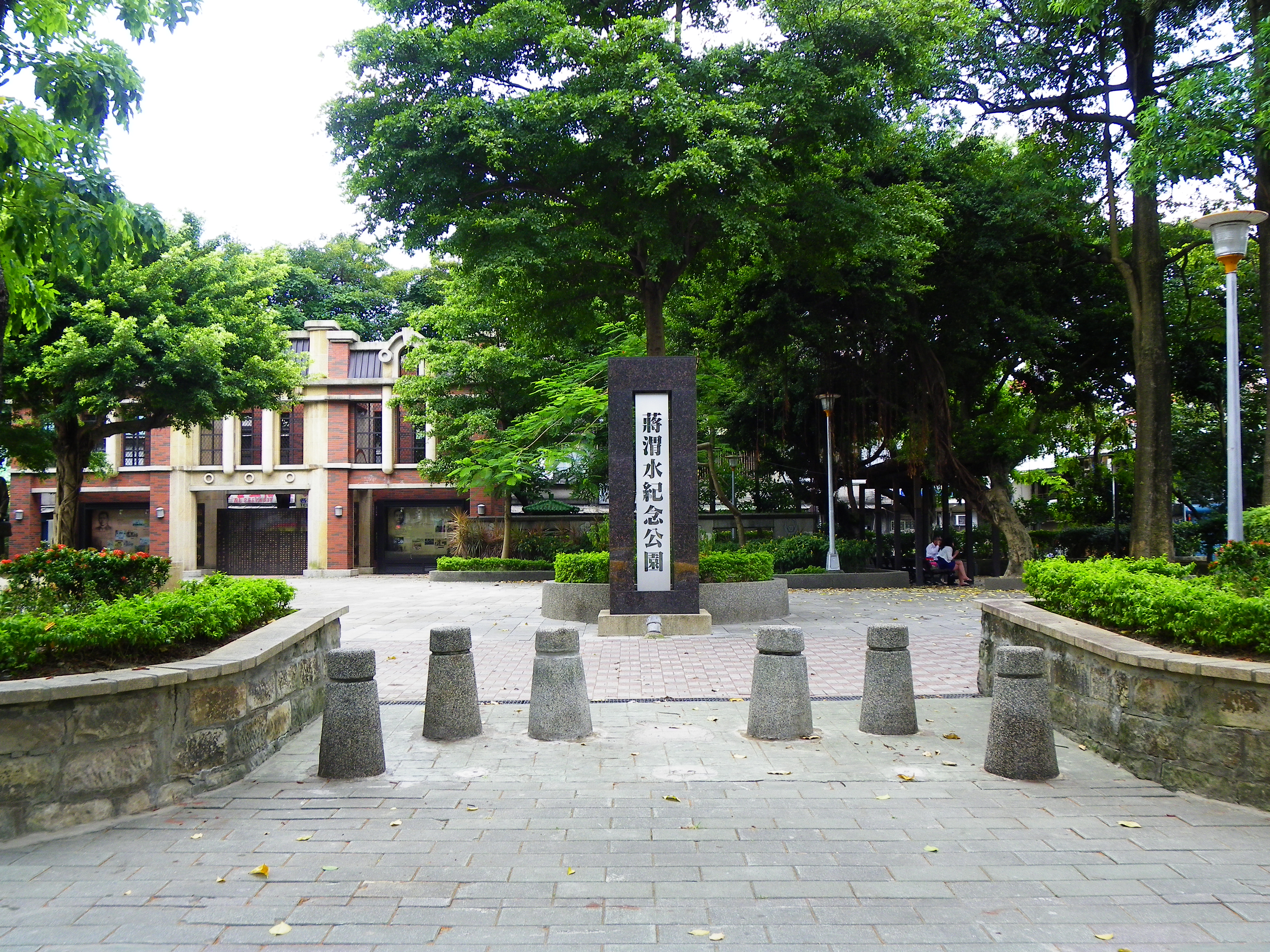
Chiang Wei-shui Memorial Park

Chiang Wei-chuan continued advocating for democratization in the wake of his elder brother's death. The younger Chiang was elected to the Taihoku City Council in the 1939 local elections held under Japanese rule, joined the Kuomintang upon their arrival in Taiwan, and, after the February 28 incident of 1947, dedicated himself to negotiating with the Chen Yi-led government on the behalf of the people. Chen later ordered the Taiwan People's Association cofounded by Chiang Wei-chuan to change its name to the Taiwan Provincial Political Construction Association and subsequently disband. Chiang then went into hiding for a year. Chiang was featured on 50,000,000 commemorative 10 New Taiwan Dollar coins issued on 5 August 2010. In 1949, Chiang Wei-chuan was appointed leader of the Department of Civil Affairs, and in 1950 became deputy interior minister. Chiang Wei-chuan died in 1975.

A 12.9 km (8.0 mi) freeway tunnel passing under Xueshan to link Taipei with Yilan was opened in 2006. It marked the completion of Taiwan's latest freeway, which was subsequently named the Chiang Wei-shui Freeway in a move that pleased all sides of the political spectrum in Taiwan.
