= Cross-Strait Peace Forum =

Forum between mainland China and Taiwan

The Cross-Strait Peace Forum (simplified Chinese: 两岸和平论坛; traditional Chinese: 兩岸和平論壇; pinyin: Liǎng'àn Hépíng Lùntán) is a forum between Mainland China and Taiwan to discuss the peaceful development of the cross-strait relations. The forum was firstly held in October 2013.

== Forums ==
=== 1st Forum ===
The first Cross-Strait Peace Forum was held on 11–12 October 2013 in Shanghai. The theme of the forum was Cross-Strait Peace, Common Development. It was organized by Mainland's National Society of Taiwan Studies and Taiwan's 21st Century Foundation. Around 120 experts and academics attended the forum.

Many topics were discussed in the forum, which are the conditions needed to be created for the leaders from the two sides to meet up, engagement in military contacts and exchanges to promote stability in the Taiwan Strait and alleviate worries over military security, setting up a coordination mechanism for external affairs, cooperation in humanitarian aid and disaster responses, enhancement of maritime cooperation and exploring the possibility of signing maritime security agreements.

The forum was concluded with the future discussion regarding the possibility of establishing a permanent institution for the forum in the second forum scheduled to be held in Taiwan next year.

== See also ==
- Cross-Strait relations
- Cross-Strait Economic, Trade and Culture Forum
