= Taiwanese People's Party =

Political party in Japanese-ruled Taiwan

Taiwanese People's Party 臺灣民眾黨
- Founded: 10 July 1927
- Banned: August 1931
- Headquarters: Taichū, Japanese Taiwan
- Ideology: Liberalism; Reformism; Socialism; Three Principles of the People; Taiwanese–Chinese nationalism
- Political position: Left-wing

Party flag

Taiwanese People's Party

Chinese name
- Traditional Chinese: 臺灣民眾黨
- Simplified Chinese: 台湾民众党
Transcriptions
Standard Mandarin
- Hanyu Pinyin: Táiwān Mínzhòng Dǎng
Southern Min
- Hokkien POJ: Tâi-oân Bîn-chiòng Tóng

Japanese name
- Kanji: 臺灣民眾黨
- Kana: たいわんみんしゅうとう
Transcriptions
- Romanization: Taiwan Minshu-tō

The original party flag, 2 January 1929 – 6 October 1929

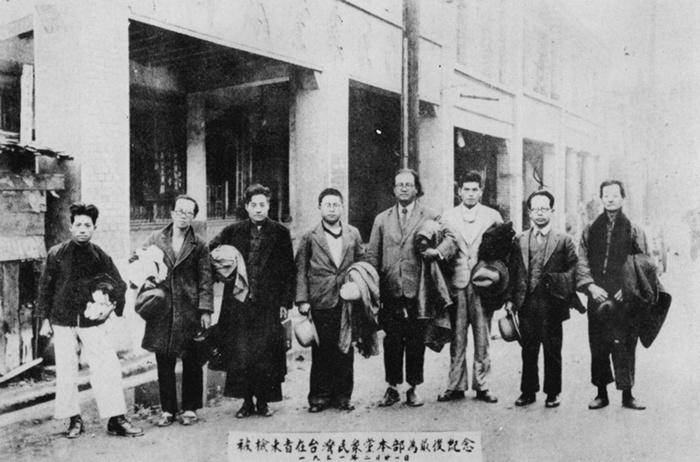
Party members on 18 February 1931

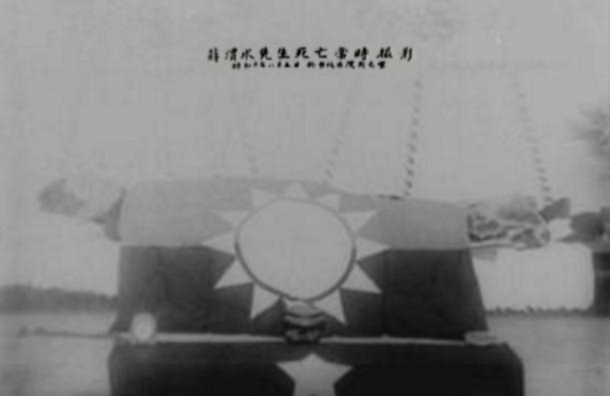
Chiang Wei-shui's body was covered with the party's original flag during his funeral

The Taiwanese People's Party, founded in 1927, was nominally Taiwan's first political party, preceding the founding of the Taiwanese Communist Party by nine months. Initially a party with members holding moderate and conservative views, by the time of its banning, on 18 February 1931, it had become a solidly leftist, workers-oriented party. In a political atmosphere increasingly dominated by the rise of Japanese fascism, the party never participated in electoral politics.

== History ==
The party grew out of the conflict within the Taiwanese Cultural Association. By the late 1920s that organization had become largely socialist-dominated. A group of its founders met during the first half of 1927 to plan an alternative, more moderate organization. After several of their proposals had been rejected by the Japanese authorities, they finally settled on "Taiwanese People's Party" and a much diluted, vaguely worded party program. Specifically the new party officially disavowed any ambition to promote "national struggle" and declared its intention to use legal means to "affirm democratic politics", establish "reasonable economic organization" and reform "defects in the social institutions". In terms of policy it advocated the rights of Taiwanese to publish newspapers, the need to teach Taiwanese in public schools, abolition of a system of informers known as Hoko System, removal of the need for passports when travelling to China, and reform of the farmers' associations and government monopolies.

The party grew quickly. By the end of 1927, it had 15 branches and 456 members; among them, many prominent elites, including landowners, lawyers and doctors. However, the vague party charter soon presented problems: on the one hand the charter had apparently managed to placate the wary authorities; on the other, the vague wording had the effect of hiding away some of the divisive ideological differences among the most powerful players. During the party's short existence its internal politics was dominated by the struggle between the left-wing, led by Chiang Wei-shui, and the right-wing, represented by Peng Hua-ying, to define the party's core values, particularly its position on "the class question". Whereas Chiang's faction sought to define the party as representing the interests of workers and peasants, Peng's faction took the moderate position of "working to improve their quality of life". After Chiang set up the Taiwan Peasants' Union as a party affiliate in February 1928, Peng resigned in protest. In August 1930 a number of conservatives left the party to form the Taiwanese Alliance for Home Rule, led by Lin Hsien-tang and Tsai Pei-huo.

By the third party congress later that year, Chiang had won control of the executive committee. His proposal for a revision of the party charter was passed the following year. It admonished "bourgeois" and "reactionary" members for not heeding the international climate, which had "strengthened the consciousness of struggle within the island's masses". The revised charter characterized the party as one to work toward the political freedom and interests of workers, peasants, the urban proletariat, and all similarly oppressed. Chiang believed that the time was ripe for a strategy that combined class and national (anti-colonial) movements.

For the most part, the party was not effective in achieving its goals. On 7 July 1927 it put forward a "Statement of Recommendations", given to Prime Minister Hamaguchi Osachi, that demanded local autonomy for the island and urged freedom of speech. The following year, it demanded that the colonial governor institute popular, proportionally representative ballot for some councils. Its singular triumph was in forcing the authorities to set aside budget for establishing treatment centers for opium addicts. The party successfully created international pressure by filing complaints to the League of Nations (of which Japan remained a member until the early 1930s), which then sent a representative to investigate.

As civilian rule gave way to a new, harsher phase of all-consuming militarism in Taiwan and elsewhere in the Japanese colonies, the fate of the party was sealed. Ironically the result was essentially as Peng Hua-ying had predicted in his objection to Chiang's more radical vision: As soon as the fourth party congress passed the revised charter, the authorities proceeded to ban the organization. Chiang Wei-shui and other party leaders were arrested. In its statement the authorities accused "leftist, nationalist members" of controlling the party and secretly working on independence for the colony, as well as alerting the international community of Japan's use of chemical warfare in suppressing the Musha Rebellion of 1930. Chiang himself came to be disillusioned with legitimate political means of reform. After his death in August 1931 from typhoid, the party fell into disarray and later disbanded.

== Platform ==
The party program of the TPP was socialist, emphasizing constitutional democracy and separation of power with a new Taiwanese constitution. The party had a radical economic program aiming at redistributing land to peasants and removing big landlords, abolishing big bourgeoisie and privileged classes in Taiwan, and implementing socialist programs to nationalize big companies and improve workers' rights. It also included the liberation of the Taiwanese people and regaining Taiwanese sovereignty from the Empire of Japan. Those programs were heavily inspired by Sun Yat-sen's Three Principles of the People, and utilized a Taiwanese nationalism as part of a broader Chinese nationalism. It also adopted Kuomintang-style socialism.

== See also ==
- Pro-Republic of China
