= 27 Brigade =

- Traditional Chinese: 二七部隊
- Simplified Chinese: 二七部队
Transcriptions
Standard Mandarin
- Hanyu Pinyin: Èr qī bùduì
- Gwoyeu Romatzyh: Ell chi Buhduey
Southern Min
- Hokkien POJ: Jī-chhit Pō͘-tūi
- Tâi-lô: Jī-tshit Pōo-tuī

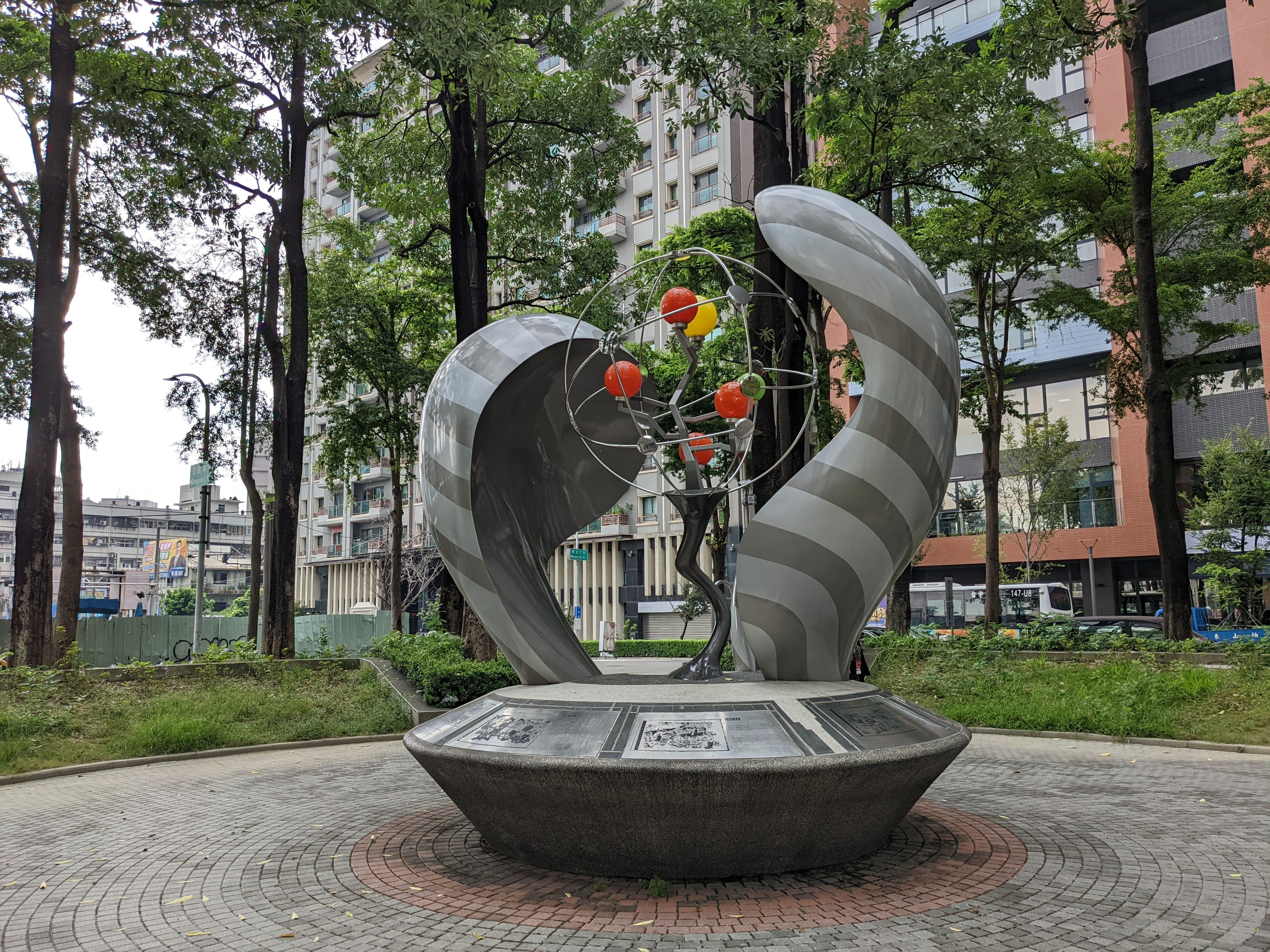
Monument of 27 Brigade, located at Gancheng near Taichung Railway Station

27 Brigade (Chinese: 二七部隊) was a guerrilla force formed in Taichung, Taiwan, shortly after the outbreak of February 28 Incident. It was organized by Xie Xuehong, a leading figure of Taiwanese Communist Party during the Japanese Administration Era, and was led by local Taichung scholar Chung Yi-ren. The total strength of the brigade remains disputed, with sources putting it as low as 30 and as many as 4,000; however, it is agreed that the bulk of the force was made up of young students and discharged soldiers who had fought in World War II for the Empire of Japan. One source also claims that the 27 Brigade discovered a secret weapon cache left by the Japanese that contained enough weapons and ammunition to arm "three whole divisions," which remains disputed today.

On 15 March 1947, when the Kuomintang (KMT) forces closed-in on Taichung, the brigade sent several detachments out to engage. The confrontation became known as the Battle of Wuniulan. They did force the enemy force back, but also sustained heavy casualties and faced shortage of ammunition. The next day, the KMT force, after being reinforced and receiving heavy weaponry, assaulted positions held by the 27 Brigade, inflicted some casualties and forced them to retreat. At night, brigade leaders agreed to disband the brigade; brigade members hid their weapons and returned home shortly before midnight.

== Legacy ==
In 2017, a monument was erected in Taichung commemorating the actions of the 27 Brigade. A documentary, The 27 Brigade Documentary (2七部隊紀錄片), was produced in the same year.
