= Taiwanese Cultural Association =

Organization during Japanese rule of Taiwan

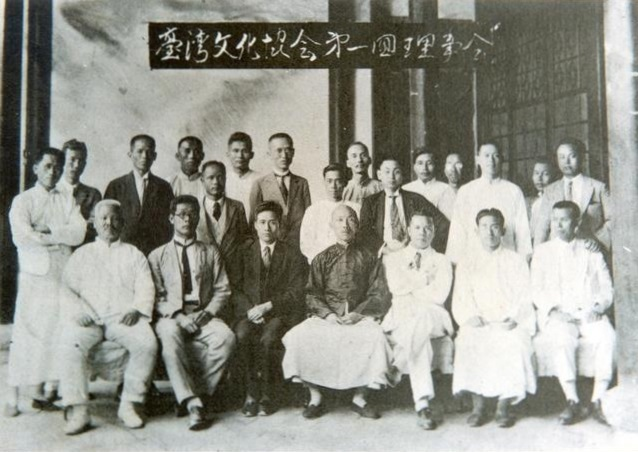
- Commemorative group photo of the first board meeting of the Taiwanese Cultural Association
- Abbreviation: TCA
- Formation: 17 October 1921
- Founder: Chiang Wei-shui, Lin Hsien-tang
- Dissolved: 1931

The Taiwanese Cultural Association (TCA; Chinese: 台灣文化協會; Pe̍h-ōe-jī: Tâi-oân Bûn-hòa Hia̍p-hōe; Tâi-lô: Tâi-uân bûn-huà hia̍p-huē) was an important organization during the Japanese rule of Taiwan. It was founded by Chiang Wei-shui on 17 October 1921, in Daitōtei, a district in modern-day Taipei. It gathered Taiwanese intellectuals and aimed to deliver progressive ideas and values. It also functioned as a political group advocating for Taiwanese collective consciousness and thought. At the association's founding, Lin Hsien-tang (林獻堂) was elected as president, Yang Chi-chen (楊吉臣) as vice president, and Chiang (蔣渭水) as director.

== History ==
After World War I, a wave of self-determination and democracy engulfed the world. Taiwan was also inundated with this new sense of independence. Inspired by the Samil Movement in Korea in 1919, Taiwanese college students in Japan further developed their craving for an independent Taiwan.

At that time, only wealthy Taiwanese families could send their children to Japanese universities. Most of these children were born and raised during the Japanese colonization of Taiwan. Therefore, they were taught using Japanese methods and customs quite different from the education they got in their homeland, which was a formal Chinese system that taught strict traditions and ancient philosophies. In Japan, Taiwanese students experienced extreme racism from not only Japanese students but also their friends and relatives. When improperly treated by the Japanese (e.g. being called Chankoro (清國奴; lit. 'Qing slaves')), these students would often search for methods of circumventing trouble. Due to these actions, they were often taunted by Korean students for not fighting for their own rights.

=== Japan ===
Japan was not only the hub for advanced education for Taiwanese students, it also gave them an excellent opportunity to learn revolutionary ideas such as equality for all people and freedom, options that the Japanese regime would not allow. This was where intellectuals adopted new and more innovative ideas in order to gain either independence or autonomy for Taiwan. These intellectuals often held conferences discussing beneficial possibilities. They petitioned the Japanese government to permit the enactment of a representative committee which would speak in favour of Taiwanese people, thus taking a vital step towards democracy. The committee, established in 1921, was called the Petition Movement for the Establishment of a Taiwanese Parliament. Lin Hsien-tang was elected as its chairperson. During its fourteen-year span, many rallies were held.

== Activities ==
The Taiwanese Cultural Association formed to advocate for self-determination policies in response to the Japanese colonial government's efforts to assimilate Taiwanese people through the principle of homeland extensionism.

The association disseminated knowledge to the public through various means, such as mass media and public events. The association published the Taiwan Minpao and established newspaper-reading clubs throughout Taiwan. Furthermore, they set up bookstores, theater troupes, and organized workshops and lectures. Among these activities, lectures gained significant popularity due to the substantial illiteracy rate in Taiwan at the time, which weakened the efficacy of written communication. To promote the Taiwan Minpao, the association conducted a touring lecture series across the island. These lectures focused on issues of nationalism and criticized the policies of the Taiwan Sōtokufu (Government-General of Taiwan). This approach resonated strongly with the people of Taiwan. The number of attendees in 1925 and 1926 reached over 230,000.

As the Taiwanese Cultural Association continued its Petition for the Establishment of a Taiwan Parliament movement, the Taiwan Sōtokufu began to feel increasingly threatened. In response, it not only mobilized supportive gentry against the movement, but also implemented measures to stifle dissenting opinions. Eventually, in 1923, a number of association members were arrested by the government on charges of violating the Peace Preservation Law. From the very beginning of the association, many participants were Taiwanese students studying in China or Japan, and they promoted socialist ideology. This, in turn, caused divisions in the organization, with a stark contrast between the moderate faction dominated by landlords and the socialist faction led by the youth. As the association became increasingly involved in labour and peasant movements it gradually radicalized, but disbanded in 1931 after the arrest of several of its members.

== See also ==
- Taipei Community Services Center (offers support services to the international community)
