= Common prosperity =

Chinese political slogan

Common prosperity (Chinese: 共同富裕; pinyin: Gòngtóng fùyù) is a Chinese Communist Party (CCP) political slogan and stated goal to bolster social equality and economic equity. Under the leadership of CCP chairman Mao Zedong, common prosperity meant collective ownership. Paramount leader Deng Xiaoping redefined the way to achieve common prosperity by saying that some could get rich before others. Under the leadership of CCP general secretary Xi Jinping, the term gained large-scale prominence, with Xi defining common prosperity as more equal distribution of income but also saying that it is not uniform egalitarianism.

== History ==
Yu Yongyue and Wang Shiming of the Institute of Party History and Literature of the CCP Central Committee wrote that "common prosperity has always been the ideal pursued by the Chinese people for thousands of years". The article said that the concepts and ideas of common prosperity has its roots in historical China, including the notion of the Great Unity of Confucius and The Peach Blossom Spring of Tao Yuanming. They wrote that even though they didn't directly put forward the idea, Karl Marx, Friedrich Engels, Vladimir Lenin, and Joseph Stalin explored similar ideals within their works, meaning that the idea of common prosperity took ideas from both traditional Chinese culture and Marxist writers, and that therefore it had the theoretical guidance of Marxism.

=== Under Mao Zedong ===
The term was first used by the People's Daily on 25 September 1953 as part of the 65 approved slogans for the National Day of the People's Republic of China (PRC). The article read:

United together, [we must] bring into play the spirit of collectivism, improving productivity, increasing production of grain and other crops, increasing income, striving for lives of common prosperity, according to the principles of willingness and mutual benefit...

Common prosperity was mentioned again in a People's Daily headline in December 1953, in which it said there were two paths to take forward; either capitalism, "a road of a few getting rich, while the vast majority are poor and destitute", and socialism, which was "the path of common prosperity". The article defined common prosperity as collective ownership of the means of production.

=== During the reform and opening up ===
Paramount leader Deng Xiaoping later redefined how common prosperity could be achieved, saying that "[o]ur policy is to let some people and some regions get rich first, in order to drive and help the backward regions, and it is an obligation for the advanced regions to help the backward regions". In Deng's view, both state planning and market mechanisms were tools to liberate productivity, and that while a capitalist market economy is dominated by individualism, a socialist market economy would lead to common prosperity.

A People's Daily article on 19 February 1979 called A Portion of Peasants Getting Rich First Should Be Encouraged (一部分农民先富起来应受到鼓励) attacked Lin Biao, historically Mao's chosen successor, and the Gang of Four, a powerful faction during the Cultural Revolution, and decried what it said was the practice of egalitarianism in the people's communes, saying that "[w]hat was originally intended to guide commune members down a road to ‘common prosperity,’ in the end made a rich team poor, and then poorer and poorer". Another People's Daily article on 15 April 1979 titled A Few Getting Rich First and Common Prosperity (一部分先富裕和共同富裕) stated:

我们党领导农民走社会主义道路，就是‘要使全体农村人民共同富裕起来’。允许一部分农民先富起来，正是为了达到共同富裕的一项切合实际的政策。

Our Party's leading of the peasants along the path of socialism is about ‘making all rural people achieve common prosperity.’ Allowing some peasants to get rich first is a practical policy to achieve common prosperity.

Another People's Daily article in December 1979 titled Common Prosperity Does Not Mean Equal Wealth (共同富裕不是平均富裕) went further, saying that "[s]ocialism is not egalitarianism, and common prosperity does not mean equal wealth". These redefinitions allowed China to justify the reform and opening up, moving away from planned economy to a market-oriented economy. While this allowed Chinese economy to grow rapidly, it also led to China becoming one of the most unequal countries on earth. Chinese scholar Li Shi, dean of the Institute for Common Prosperity and Development at Zhejiang University, stated in 2026 that the Gini coefficient rose from 0.45 in 1995 to above 0.7 in 2023.

==== Under Bo Xilai ====
In 2011, Bo Xilai, the CCP committee secretary of Chongqing, undertook a campaign to promote common prosperity in the municipality as part of his broader "Chongqing model". During a speech to the Chongqing Municipal CCP Committee on 25 July 2011, he said:

We regard the improvement of people's livelihood as both the purpose of development and the driving force for development. Taking the road of "people's livelihood" and chanting the “common prosperity” mantra, we have taken the initial steps to promote "common prosperity." Today some people regard common prosperity only as the starting point and destination of development, which I think is not enough. "Common prosperity" is not only an ideal, but also a driving force; it is not only the "starting point" and the "destination," but also runs through the whole process of development.

In what is called the "cake theory" which metaphorized China's economy as baking a cake, Bo and his supporters clashed with the more economically liberal Guangdong CCP committee secretary Wang Yang, with Wang advocating for "making the cake bigger" while Bo advocated for "dividing the cake more equitably". Bo stated that a more equitable growth was more favorable to China, saying "[s]ome people worry that seeking common prosperity will delay development and maintain that we should first make a big cake and then divide it. Actually, you not only can make a big cake and divide the cake well at the same time, but the more you divide the cake well, the bigger and faster you can make it."

Bo's campaign for common prosperity included decreasing inequality between urban and rural residents, increasing role of the state sector and the government in the economy, and a fairer distribution of income. For this, he enacted policies such as expansion of low-income housing, land transfer policies for the rural residents of Chongqing in exchange for employment and urban hukou, and increasing state funding for social programs. Common prosperity was mentioned over 200 times in major newspapers in China from late 2010 to March 2012, with 85% of them being from Chongqing Daily. The campaign ended with the Wang Lijun incident which led to the end of Bo's political career and removal from power in March 2012. Mary E. Gallagher, a sinologist and professor at the University of Michigan, wrote that Bo's campaign "seems to be the unspoken inspiration" for the campaign launched under Xi. However, she also argued that unlike Bo, Xi focused less on redistribution and more on expanding of state control in his own common prosperity campaign.

=== Under Xi Jinping ===
During his leadership, CCP general secretary Xi Jinping has also alluded to the goal of common prosperity. In an inspection of poor villages in Hebei province in December 2012, Xi called common prosperity an "essential requirement of socialism". At the CCP's 19th National Congress in 2017, Xi included "basically achieving common prosperity for the entire population" as a goal for 2050.

The term saw a large revival in 2021. In a speech to the Central Financial and Economic Affairs Commission (CFEAC), later published in the CCP theoretical journal Qiushi, Xi said that in some countries "the wealth gap and middle-class collapse have aggravated social divisions, political polarization and populism, giving a profound lesson to the world", saying that China should promote common prosperity to guard against this fate. He said that common prosperity "is an essential requirement of socialism and a key feature of Chinese-style modernization", and defined it as affluence and prosperity for all, rather than the few, but also said that it is not "uniform egalitarianism" and that "not everyone will be wealthy at the same time". He additionally said that by 2035, China will make "substantial progress" to the realization of common prosperity, in which there will be "equitable access to basic public services" and that by the middle of the 21st century, common prosperity will be "basically achieved", in which the urban-rural income gap will be shrunk "to a reasonable range". He also warned against the "disorderly expansion of capital". He spoke out against the trend of "lying flat", warning against shrinking social mobility. Xi vowed to "adjust excessive incomes", but also spoken out against "welfarism", saying that too much welfare "encourages laziness". The timetable for common prosperity that Xi gave includes:

Timetable for Common Prosperity in the New Era of Socialism with Chinese Characteristics
End of the 14th Five-Year Plan	2035	Mid-century
Solid steps have been taken towards common prosperity for all people, and the gap between residents' income and actual consumption levels has gradually narrowed.	Significant and substantial progress has been made in achieving common prosperity for all people, and basic public services have been equalized.	Common prosperity for all people has been basically achieved, and the gap between residents' income and actual consumption level has been narrowed to a reasonable range.

Han Wenxiu, another official from the CFEAC, echoed Xi's claims, saying that people "who get rich first" should help those left behind but that common prosperity would still involve economic disparities and that it does not mean "killing the rich to help the poor". Zhao Feng, a professor at the Renmin University of China said that common prosperity needs a "society of public ownership". According to The New York Times, Chinese officials and advisers have said that they want to create an "olive-shaped" society with a large middle-class and little in extreme wealth or poverty. During a speech in 2023, Xi identified common prosperity as a component of "Chinese-style modernization", which he said "breaks the myth of 'modernization equals Westernization'".

Starting in 2022, the term was downplayed after increasing economic difficulties. However, some policies associated with the term continued; for example, there were large amounts of pay cuts for investment bankers, sometimes up to 60 percent. During the 20th CCP National Congress in October 2022, the CCP amended its constitution to include a goal of "gradually achieving common prosperity". Consistent with this principle, the 20th National Congress emphasized that the CCP's economic agenda should focus on quality of growth, rather than raw quantity.

==== Policies associated with Common Prosperity ====
Especially in 2021, common prosperity was used as justification for large-scale regulations and crackdowns against perceived excesses of private industries, most prominently the tech, property and the tutoring sectors. As part of common prosperity, China passed new anti-monopoly rules including one that stopped companies from using algorithms to have users spend more or "disrupt social order", fined several companies, such as Alibaba Group, Tencent, Baidu, and DiDi, for breaking various laws, and banned tutoring companies from making profits, effectively decimating the industry. The large amount of regulations have caused the tech companies to lose around $1 trillion in stock market value in 2021.

Responding to calls for common prosperity, China's largest private firms have increased their focus on philanthropy. However, as of 2022 they had done little to raise wages and benefits for their lowest paid workers, a practice which Xi has criticized as superficial compliance. In 2021, Alibaba Group was reported to have pledged $15 billion towards common prosperity. In August 2021, Tencent created a $7.7 billion fund towards common prosperity. On 3 February 2022, Liu Qiangdong, founder of JD.com, announced he was donating $2.2 billion worth of stocks to charity as part of common prosperity. By 2022, Hurun's China Rich List reported that top ten philanthropists in China pledged 6.3 percent of their wealth to donation totaling around $8.7 billion, while 49 benefactors in total gave away $10 billion from April 2021 to August 2022. In response to the common prosperity policies, Goldman Sachs created a portfolio of 50 stocks which includes companies related to manufacturing, green energy, consumption and state-owned enterprise (SOE) reform. In November 2021, Xi additionally opened a new stock exchange in Beijing targeted for small and medium enterprises (SMEs), which was a part of this campaign.

The common prosperity campaign also targeted China's large property sector. As part of the campaign, China pledged to build 6.5 million low-cost rental houses, from 2021 to 2025, accounting for 26% of the new housing supply. Xi was also considering a property tax to control the high property prices in 2021, initially through trial efforts in several cities. However, The Wall Street Journal reported the plan was met with high resistance and thus was limited to an even smaller number of cities.

The push for common prosperity has also included salary and bonus cuts, especially across the financial sector, as well as crackdowns on wealth flaunting. On 22 November 2022, JD.com announced that more than 2,000 of its top managers will face salary cuts of around 10 percent to 20 percent which was said to be aligned with common prosperity. On 4 January 2023, Bloomberg News reported that China International Capital Corporation (CICC) was cutting travel perks for its senior bankers as part of the policy. In August 2023, Reuters reported Bank of China launched a countrywide exercise to reduce the salary gaps among its employees and mid- and high-level managers. In July 2023, Reuters reported CITIC Securities lowered its baseline salaries across its banking division by up to 15%. In April 2024, Bloomberg News reported several mutual fund managers proposed capping their salaries at 3 million yuan. Bloomberg News later reported in June 2024 that several of China's financial companies including China Merchants Group, China Everbright Group and CITIC Group asked their senior staff to forgo deferred bonuses and in some cases return salaries from the previous years to comply with a new salary cap of 2.9 million yuan.

In July 2024, Reuters reported that China Merchants Fund Management and Bosera Asset Management, two of China's largest fund managers, capped the annual income of their staff to 3 million yuan and 2.9 million yuan respectively and would demand clawback for anything more than that amount in the previous year. It also reported China Construction Bank would cut the salary of its staff at its headquarters by 10%. In the same month, the South China Morning Post reported all state-backed brokerages, mutual fund firms and banks except financial institutions that backed by private investors would implement a salary cap of 3 million yuan, with those who earned higher than the cap in the previous years required to return their excess salary. In September 2024, Reuters reported China Minsheng Bank cut the salary of its staff by 50% and stopped paying for some work-related expenses in its Beijing branch. In January 2025, the South China Morning Post and Reuters reported central government-owned financial institutions will set a 1 million yuan cap for their senior executives, and their subsidiaries implementing a 3 million yuan cap.

===== Zhejiang Pilot Zone =====
In July 2021, the Zhejiang Provincial People's Government declared that it will become a "pilot zone" for common prosperity. It was the first local government to do so. The stated goals by 2025 of the government were:

	Status in 2020	2025 Target
GDP per capita	$15,480	$20,000
Number of registered firms	8.3 million	11 million
Disposable income	$8,102	$11,597
Share of wages as GDP	47.8% (as of 2019)	50%
Urbanization rate	72.2%	75%
Share of population earning incomes around $15,500 – $77,300	75%	80%
College enrollment rate	62.4%	70%
Urban-rural income ratio	1.8 (as of June 2021)	Under 1.9

Bloomberg News said the goals were "modest" and that Zhejiang was already on track to achieve these goals. On 1 November 2022, Jiashan County of Zhejiang was named by a guideline of the National Development and Reform Commission (NDRC) as a "leading trial area" for common prosperity. The guideline included goals such as expanding the middle class of the local population to 82%, increasing research and development spending to 4% of the local economic output, and decreasing the per capita disposable income ratio between urban and rural areas to 1.55 (the figure was at 1.35 at the end of June). It also said that the county would be turned into "a model of high-quality, county-level development" by 2035.

Following the May 2021 report from Zhejiang, a three-tier distribution system has become the focus of common prosperity policies. The first distribution aims to increase personal income for the majority of the population (especially low-income groups) through measures including reasonable salaries, adjusting the minimum wage, and enforcing a holiday pay system. The second distribution aims to protect government revenue, optimize government expenditures, and developing a more robust social safety net. The third distribution aims to encourage high income groups and entrepreneurs to repay society, including through exploring new forms of donation and preferential tax treatment for charitable donations.

As part of the common prosperity policy, Zhejiang announced in 2024 that it would remove restrictions in hukou registrations in all of the province except the provincial capital Hangzhou. In January 2025, the Zhejiang provincial government announced a four-point road map to achieve common prosperity by 2025; the road map proposed there would be "tangible progress" by 2025, further results by 2027 and 2030, and a "decisive victory" by 2035.

==== Analysis ====
Tom Hancock and Tom Orlik of Bloomberg News collectively referred the common prosperity policies as "progressive authoritarianism", while the turn towards common prosperity was called a shift towards left-wing politics and socialism by Katsuji Nakazawa of Nikkei Asia. The Wall Street Journal reported that the ultimate aim of common prosperity was to return the CCP closer to its socialist roots by increasing state control over the economy, while still allowing market mechanisms to exist. Mary E. Gallagher, a sinologist, argued that while Xi's campaign officially targeted inequality, there was little change to redistribution policies, saying that the campaign was instead used to further advance CCP control over the Chinese economy. American economist Steven Roach writes that China's focus on common prosperity is an attempt to use state intervention to improve the quality of China's economic growth which had been neglected in prior decades as China focused on raw growth.

One concern of the common prosperity policies has been that they will stifle innovation and dynamism of the private sector. Others, including Willy Wo-Lap Lam, a political analyst writing for the Jamestown Foundation, have argued the campaign is designed to enhance CCP control over private enterprises while James Palmer of Foreign Policy stated that "in theory, common prosperity is an attempt to make the Chinese economy more equal, but in practice, it has become another excuse for putting the CCP in charge of everything, especially private businesses." A Bloomberg Economics report in 2021 said that, if successful, common prosperity policies will lift fertility rates and lead to an average of 3.2% growth in the 2040s, compared to the base case scenario of 2.6%, even if it initially costs some short term growth. However, if the policies are not successful, it said that it would cost China short-term growth with no long-term benefits.

Zhang Weiying, a pro-market economist in China, warned that China risks "common poverty" rather than common prosperity if it pushed too far with state control over the economy. Ren Yi, an online internet commentator who writes under the name "Chairman Rabbit", said that common prosperity will allow China to better adapt to the future of technology, especially artificial intelligence (AI). Ray Dalio, an American billionaire and long time supporter of the Chinese government, praised the common prosperity campaign and said that the US "needs more common prosperity" along with many other countries. Despite his company being targeted by the campaign, Alibaba Group CEO Daniel Zhang announced his support for common prosperity.

Li Guangman, a retired newspaper editor affiliated with China's New Left, published an article that claims a "profound revolution" was close that would mark a return "to the original intent of the CCP", continuing that:

This transformation will wash away all the dust: capital markets will no longer be a paradise for get-rich-quick capitalists, cultural markets will no longer be heaven for sissy-boy stars, and news and public opinion will no longer be in the position of worshipping western culture. It is a return to the revolutionary spirit, a return to heroism, a return to courage and righteousness.

Major Chinese state news agencies published the article, including People's Daily and Xinhua News Agency, setting off widespread worries about parallels to the Cultural Revolution. In response, the news agencies tried to downplay the incident by not carrying the article in their print versions, some of them removing the article from their sites and, in the case of People's Daily, publishing a front-page editorial in support of market forces. In 2026, a report by the Institute for Common Prosperity and Development at Zhejiang University stated that efforts toward common prosperity has faced challenges since 2022 and 2023 amid slowing economic growth and growing inequality.

== See also ==
- Income inequality in China
- Median income
