= Apportionment (politics) =

Way to distribute seats in a legislative body

A cartogram shows the 2020 US census apportionment in a linear manner.

Apportionment is the process by which seats in a legislative body are distributed among constituencies in a redistribution operation, or among parties in a party-list proportional election; the two takes are mathematically equivalent. This page presents the general principles and issues related to apportionment. The apportionment by country page describes the specific practices used around the world. The mathematics of apportionment page describes mathematical formulations and properties of apportionment rules.

The simplest and most universal principle is that elections should give each vote an equal weight. This is both intuitive and stated in laws such as the Polish Five-point electoral law and Article 25 of the International Covenant on Civil and Political Rights, as well as in other documents, such as the Venice Commission's Code of Good Practice in Electoral Matters and court rulings based on more general equality cluases such as the Equal Protection Clause of the Fourteenth Amendment to the United States Constitution.

One example of deliberate malapportionment is seen in bicameral legislatures: where the lower house represents constituencies in proportion to their population, the upper house represents the constituencies as such, giving them an equal number of seats despite their population variance. This is modeled after the Connecticut Compromise, which formed the basis of the United States Senate; for that reason it is particularly common in states where the regions enjoy significant political autonomy from the central government, such as federations and regionalized unitary states.

== Common problems ==
Fundamentally, the representation of a population in the thousands or millions by a reasonably sized, and thus accountable, governing body involves arithmetic that will not be exact. Although weighing a representative's votes (on proposed laws and measures etc.) according to the number of their constituents could make representation more exact, giving each representative exactly one vote avoids complexity in governance.

Over time, populations migrate and change in number. Governing bodies, however, usually exist for a defined term of office. While many systems provide for dissolution of the legislature in reaction to political events, no system tries to make real-time adjustments (during one term of office) to reflect demographic changes. Instead, any redistricting takes effect at the next scheduled election or next scheduled census.

== Among constituencies ==
In many legislatures, the members represent geographical districts, which may be single-member or multi-member.

As a general rule, single-member districts are typically purpose-drawn to ensure that each district comprises the same number of residents or voters, while mutli-member districts have static borders, with only the number of seats from each district changing in a redistribution operation. However, this is not universal, for reasons including the following:

- In federations like the United States, Germany, Brazil, and Nigeria, as well as regional states such as Spain, Indonesia, and Bolivia, the regions, states, or provinces are viewed as important entities in their own right rather than mere administrative divisions, and it is not uncommon for residents of a given region identify as citizens of their region first and of the country as a whole second; the regions also have institutional interests that they seek to pursue even in matters under the jurisdiction of the federal or central government. Consequently, election districts are required to be contained in one region only.
- Malapportionment might be deliberate, as when the governing documents guarantee outlying regions a specific number of seats. Denmark guarantees two seats each for Greenland and the Faroe Islands; Norway apportions seats between the districts under a system that considers both population and area, with each inhabitant counting as one point and each square kilometer of area counting as 1.8 points; Spain has a number of designated seats and Canada's apportionment benefits its territories. Remote regions might have special views to which the governing body should give dedicated weight; otherwise they might be inclined to secede.
- Administrative convenience: the otherwise-static borders of multi-member districts are adjusted to line up with new administrative boundaries, or with electoral districts of a higher or lower rung. For example, in Poland, local government reforms in 1998 replaced the country's 49 voivodeships with 16 large "regional" ones; the Sejm and Senate constituencies, which used the voivodeships as "building blocks", had to be completely redrawn as a consequence. In the devolved parliaments of the United Kingdom, the Scottish Parliament has multi-member regions created from combining adjacent single-member constituencies as part of its additional member system, while Wales's Senedd is elected from multi-member constituencies that are formed by pairing together adjacent constituencies for the UK House of Commons.
- The basis for apportionment may be out of date. For example, in India, the Forty-second Amendment of the Constitution (passed in 1976) froze the distribution of Lok Sabha seats between the states to be based on the 1971 census until the year 2000, which was later extended to 2026. This was done to ensure that government family planning programs would not cause states to "lose out" on their share of seats due to reduced population growth.

== Among party lists ==
For party-list proportional representation elections the number of seats for a political party is determined by the number of votes. This apportionment typically takes place separately for each multi-member district; however some systems elect all of the members from a single at-large constituency, while others employ leveling seats to correct for the distortions that result from the district-level apportionments.

This system tallies (agglomerates) more of the voters' preferences. As in other systems parties with very few voters do not earn a representative in the governing body. Moreover, to reduce fragmentation in the legislature, most (but not all) such systems impose an electoral threshold that a party must reach (for example, some percentage of the total vote) to qualify to obtain representatives in the body which eliminates small parties; only parties crossing this threshold are considered for apportionment. With the minimum votes threshold version, if a subtype of single-issue politics based on a local issue exists, those parties or candidates distancing themselves from a broad swathe of electoral districts, such as marginal secessionists, or using a marginal minority language, may find themselves without representation.

Apportionment methods for party-list proportional representation include:

- Sainte-Laguë method – optimal seats-to-votes ratio
- Hare quota – optimal seats-to-votes ratio and higher apportionment paradoxes
- D'Hondt method – higher seats-to-votes ratio for larger parties
- Droop quota
- Imperiali quota
- Huntington–Hill method

These apportionment methods can be categorized into largest remainder methods and highest averages methods. These apportionment methods, also known as formulas, can be used in both list-PR and mixed-electoral systems. A third, percentage-point method can only be used in mixed-electoral systems as it requires the transfer of percentage points to one or more compensatory tiers.

== Malapportionment ==
Malapportionment is the creation of electoral districts with divergent ratios of voters to representatives. For example, if one district has 10,000 voters per seat, and another has 100,000 voters per seat, voters in the former district have ten times the influence, per person, over the governing body. Malapportionment may be deliberate, for reasons such as biasing representation toward geographic areas or a minority over equality of individuals. For example, in a federation, each member unit may have the same representation regardless of its population. In some instances sparsely populated rural regions are given intentionally equal representation to densely packed urban areas with higher populations, for example the United States Senate may reflect results counter to the majority vote.

Unequal representation can be measured in the following ways:

- By the ratio of the most populous electoral district to the least populous. In the two figures above, the ratio is 10:1. A ratio approaching 1:1 means there are no anomalies among districts. In India in 1991, a ratio of nearly 50:1 was measured. (Note: The largest district, Thane, had a population of 1,744,592, while the smallest district, Lakeshadweep, had a population of 31,665.) The Reynolds v. Sims decision of the U.S. Supreme Court found ratios of up to 1081:1 in state legislatures. A higher ratio measures the severity of the worst anomalies, but does not indicate whether inequality is prevalent.
- By the standard deviation of the electorates of electoral districts.
- Differences in seats-to-votes ratios.
- By the smallest percentage of voters that could win a majority in the governing body due to disparities in the populations of districts. For example, in a 61-member body, this would be half the voters in the 31 districts with the lowest populations. It is persuasive to show that far fewer than 50% of the voters could win a majority in the governing body. But it requires additional research to conclude that such an outcome is realistic: whether the malapportionment is systematic and designed to bias the body, or is the result of random factors that give extra power to voters whose interests are unlikely to coincide.

Apportioning by population instead of number of citizens results in malapportionment.

=== Examples of malapportionment ===
- While almost all modern-day bicameral parliaments have lower houses elected by universal suffrage and principles of one man, one vote, this often does not hold true for the upper house. Most commonly, the upper house has the same number of members from every administrative region, which prevents populous regions dominating the rest of the country. This concept, while having antecedents such as the Swiss diet, was pioneered by the US Senate and Connecticut compromise in the USA, and was copied in many other federal and regionalized countries.
- 1955 System – In Japan, malapportionment benefits the Liberal Democratic Party, who have ruled for over 60 years (with two brief periods in opposition, totaling 5 years). This has been the subject of multiple Japanese Supreme Court cases.
- Population of Canadian federal ridings – in the Canadian House of Commons, in 2021, the least populous riding had 26,000 people while the most populous had 209,000 people. Several provinces are significantly overrepresented relative to their population.
- The Constitution of Australia guarantees each of the six founding states an equal number of Senators in the Australian Senate, regardless of population, but this would not necessarily apply to other states were they admitted or created. It also does not mandate any Senators in the Northern Territory and Australian Capital Territory, and Parliament has only seen fit to provide these non-state Territories with two Senators for each Territory. In addition to the general malapportionment these requirements create between the most populous states and the least, it also means that the Australian Capital Territory has four less Senators than Tasmania despite their populations being roughly equal. Also, while the States' senators are elected in a staggered manner, with only one-half renewed every election, the two Senators for each territory are replaced all at once in every election, depriving the Territories of the stability that comes from long-term representation in the Senate.
  - The Constitution of Australia mandates a minimum of five members per original state in the Australian House of Representatives. This has the effect of creating a malapportionment where Tasmania has a significantly lower number of voters per seat than the rest of the country, giving Tasmania two additional seats than they would have without this 5 seat minimum.
  - Bjelkemander – malapportionment in Queensland, during the 1970s and 1980s, designed to benefit the rural-based Country Party who were able to govern uninhibited during this period. The system was named after Sir Joh Bjelke-Petersen, who was leader of the Country Party and Premier of Queensland for 20 years during this period. Bjelke-Petersen's administration eventually became embroiled in corruption and lost an election to the Labor Party, who removed the malapportionment.
  - Playmander – malapportionment existed in South Australia from 1938 to 1968. It was designed to benefit the rural-based Liberal and Country League, allowing them to rule with majority of seats, even when the opposing Labor Party won the popular vote. The system was named after Sir Thomas Playford, who was leader of the LCL and Premier of South Australia for 26 years during this period. The malapportionment was mostly removed by LCL leader Steele Hall who was embarrassed at how undemocratic it was.
  - The Western Australian Legislative Council had a malapportionment that clearly favoured the rural conservative National Party, with the state split into electoral regions with significant differences in voter numbers. After the Labor Party won a landslide victory in both houses in the 2021 Western Australian state election they abolished the electoral region system, replacing it with a single statewide constituency electing 37 members via optional preferential voting. This created a one-vote, one-value system.
- The United States Constitution guarantees each state two Senators in the United States Senate regardless of population. For instance, the state of California has 70 times the population of the state of Wyoming, but each has two Senators, making those who live in California vastly underrepresented. This has grown more impactful as bipartisanship has become less common, with Senators increasingly voting along party lines. Proposals to address this disparity are discussed in Reform of the United States Senate.
  - Before the US Civil War, new states were admitted into the United States in a pattern of one slave state and one free state each, creating a balance in the Senate despite the population total of the free states far exceeding that of slave states by the 1850 US census. California being admitted as a free state under the Compromise of 1850 broke the pattern and the Thirteenth Amendment to the United States Constitution abolished slavery in all states by 1865, making the issue moot.
- Rotten and pocket boroughs in England, Great Britain, or the United Kingdom before the Reform Act 1832, which had a very small electorate and could be used by a patron to gain unrepresentative influence within the unreformed House of Commons.

== See also ==
- Apportionment in the European Parliament
- Apportionment in the Hellenic Parliament
- United States congressional apportionment
