= Regional state =

Type of unitary decentralized state limited to regional government

A regional state, or a regionalised unitary state, is a term used to denote a type of state that is formally unitary but where a high degree of political power has been highly decentralised to regional governments. This contrasts with a state organized on principles of federalism (either a federal republic such as the United States, Brazil, or India or a federal monarchy such as Belgium or Malaysia) where the powers of the regions are enshrined in constitutional law. In many cases, the regions are based on long standing cultural or regional divisions.

== Europe ==
Many regional states exist in Europe because many European states are very old, and their constitutional structures evolved from absolute monarchy and hold that power emanates from the central government. This means that any regional autonomy is theoretically only existent at the sufferance of the central government. However, in practice, there would be enormous popular and political resistance if the central government tried to revoke the autonomy of a region. This can be seen in the opposition to the Spanish government's application of direct rule in Catalonia during and immediately after the Catalan crisis. Catalonia's autonomy has since been restored.

=== Italy ===
Italy is another European regional state, since it is divided into 20 regions that exercise significant authority. Five of the regions (Sicily, Sardinia, Friuli-Venezia Giulia, Trentino-Alto Adige/Südtirol, and the Val d'Aosta) are more autonomous than the others. As in Spain, some politicians and political parties in the country, especially those that express regionalist ideology, favor the establishment of a federal system in Italy.

=== Spain ===
One example of a regional state is Spain which is divided into autonomous communities which are autonomous government bodies that exercise a large degree of lawmaking and in some cases tax-setting authority but are officially creations of the central government. They are designed to ensure limited autonomy for the nationalities and regions of Spain such as the Catalans and the Galicians, among others. Many political parties in Spain, especially those expressing one of the various regional nationalisms, have called for the creation of a full federal system in the country, as opposed to the current system, which is often described as "federalism in all but name" or "federation without federalism".

=== Others ===
Europe is the continent with the most regional states. Though Spain and Italy are the most well known for their regional structures, Greece, Ukraine, France and the United Kingdom are all also regionalised and respectively divided into decentralized administrations of Greece, oblasts of Ukraine, regions of France, and countries of the United Kingdom (the United Kingdom also has a number of other types of devolved government: the Crown Dependencies and British Overseas Territories). There are also several federations in Europe, notably Germany, Austria and Belgium but also Bosnia and Herzegovina, Russia, Switzerland and debatably the Kingdom of the Netherlands (not to be confused with the Netherlands, which forms one of its constituent countries though overwhelmingly the most important one; this last also could be considered a regional state, according their provincial government duties).

Other countries such as Serbia, Portugal or Finland have devolved power to certain regions but are not regionalized because the regional system does not expand across the whole nation.

== Americas ==
There are only four regional states in the Americas: Bolivia, Chile, Colombia, and Peru. The reason is that states in the Americas were on average much more recently created than those in Europe. Thus, federal structures are much more common and are found in the United States, Canada, Mexico, Brazil, Argentina, Venezuela, and formerly the West Indies Federation. Other countries such as Nicaragua, Saint Kitts and Nevis and Antigua and Barbuda have devolved power to certain regions but are not regionalized because the regional system does not expand across the whole nation.

=== European territories ===
Several European countries (namely France, the Netherlands, and the United Kingdom) have overseas territories in the Caribbean that have devolved governments of their own.

== Asia and Pacific ==
=== People's Republic of China ===
Communist-ruled Mainland China might be considered a regional state since significant levels of power are exercised by the provinces and autonomous regions as well as the special administrative regions. Provinces exercise such a degree of independent authority that some analysts claim that there exists a de facto federation in China because of striking differences in the nature of state policy between provinces, as exemplified by the competing Chongqing model and Guangdong model.

=== Indonesia ===
Indonesia is a regionalised unitary state. It was once a federal country for a brief period following its independence under the name United States of Indonesia, but that system was replaced by a unitary one in 1950. However, the country is divided into provinces, which exercise significant authority over local issues because of the large size of the country. Additionally, some regions such as Western New Guinea and Aceh have more autonomy because of their unique and often fractious relationship with the national government. Yogyakarta Sultanate is also a region of Indonesia that has a special relationship with the central government since it is a monarchy in which the Sultan of Yogyakarta serves in a position similar to that of a governor.

=== Philippines ===
The Philippines is divided into provinces and the Bangsamoro autonomous region. The Provinces exercise significant degree of authority in local matters. Many people in the Philippines propose the creation of a federation.

=== Republic of China (Taiwan) ===
The Republic of China, which has ruled Taiwan since 1945, can be considered as a regional state as there are a number of counties and cities that are self-governing according to the Local Government Act. There are also indigenous areas throughout the island that are concentrated in the mountainous interiors of Taiwan.

=== New Zealand ===
New Zealand is divided into sixteen regions (Māori: Ngā takiwā) for local government purposes. Eleven are administered by regional councils (the top tier of local government), and five are administered by unitary authorities, which are territorial authorities (the second tier of local government) that also perform the functions of regional councils. The Chatham Islands Council is not a region but is similar to a unitary authority, authorised under its own legislation. Powers and duties are established by the Local Government Act (2002), though also have functions by the Resource Management Act 1991 and other acts (i.e. Reserves Act 1977, Biosecurity Act 1993, Maritime Transport Act 1994).

== Africa ==
There are several regional states in Africa. They are common because all of the continent's countries except for Liberia and Ethiopia came into existence in the 20th or the 21st centuries and so were not constrained by old constitutional structures in setting up their governments.

=== South Africa ===
South Africa is a regional state divided into a number of provinces, all of which have their own elected provincial legislature and Premier and exercise significant degrees of authority. Some people and political parties, most notably the Inkatha Freedom Party, advocate the establishment of a federal system in which the provinces would be the federal units.

=== Tanzania ===
Tanzania is divided into 21 regions as well as Zanzibar. The regions exercise a large degree of political power. However, Zanzibar is more autonomous than the others and has its own leader, the President of Zanzibar, and legislature, the Zanzibar House of Representatives.

=== Others ===
South Africa and Tanzania are the only true regional states in Africa, but some other states have similar aspects. Morocco is divided into Regions that exercise some power but have less regional authority than the regions of true regional states. Other unitary countries as Uganda or Ghana recognize some local traditional authorities.

== See also ==
- Home rule
- Autonomous entity
- Subnational entity
- Federacy
