= Michael W. Moynihan =

Michael W. Moynihan (c. 1928 - November 12, 1996) was an advocate of free trade who worked in the United States government and for international trade organizations, who was the younger brother of Daniel Patrick Moynihan.

== Early life and education ==
Born in Teaneck, New Jersey, he was the younger brother of United States Senator Daniel Patrick Moynihan, and grew up in Long Island City. He earned his undergraduate degree from City College of New York and a masters degree at the Fletcher School of Law and Diplomacy.

== Professional career ==
He served as spokesperson for the Office of the United States Trade Representative in the Kennedy White House and later worked in an information role in the Agency for International Development. He is credited with popularizing the phrase "a rising tide lifts all boats" which he included in a speech for President Kennedy delivered in 1963 to a conference of the General Agreement on Tariffs and Trade.

After leaving the federal government, he was hired by the Port Authority of New York and New Jersey as its Public Affairs Director, after which Moynihan ran a consulting firm that specialized in international relations and advocacy. Facing criticism for accepting a consulting contract with the government of Saudi Arabia and potential conflicts of interest relating to his brother's serving in the U.S. Senate, the younger Moynihan said that "I wouldn't want to work for anyone who is so dumb that he thought I could get favors out of my brother."

During the 1980s, Moynihan served with the Organisation for Economic Co-operation and Development as its inaugural information director and as the organization's U.S. representative.

== Death ==
He died at the age of 68 at his home in Kitty Hawk, North Carolina, on November 12, 1996.
