= Unitary state =

State with a supreme central government

De jure map of the world Unitary states Federal states

The spectrum of regional integration or separation

A unitary state is a sovereign state governed as a single entity in which the central government is the supreme authority. The central government may create or abolish administrative divisions (sub-national or sub-state units). Such units exercise only the powers that the central government chooses to delegate. Although political power may be delegated through devolution to regional or local governments by statute, the central government may alter the statute, to override the decisions of devolved governments or expand their powers.

The modern unitary state concept originated in France; in the aftermath of the Hundred Years' War, national feelings that emerged from the war unified France. The war accelerated the process of transforming France from a feudal monarchy to a unitary state. The French then later spread unitary states by conquests, throughout Europe during and after the Napoleonic Wars, and to the world through the vast French colonial empire. Presently, prefects remain an illustration of the French unitary state system, as the representatives of the State in each department, tasked with upholding central government policies.

Unitary states stand in contrast to federations, also known as federal states. A large majority of the UN member countries, 166 out of 193, have a unitary system of government, while significant population and land mass is under some kind of federation.

== Devolution compared with federalism ==
A unitary system of government can be considered to be the opposite of federalism. In federations, the provincial/regional governments share powers with the central government as equal actors through a written constitution, to which the consent of both is required to make amendments. This means that the sub-national units have a right to existence and powers that cannot be unilaterally changed by the central government.

== List of current unitary sovereign states ==
Italics: States with limited recognition from other sovereign states or intergovernmental organizations.

=== Unitary republics ===
China has a long history of unitary state goverence and still is such, despite the Special Administrative Regions having very different political systems than the ordinary 31 provincial-level administrative divisions (Chinese: Zhōngguó Neìdì; note this is different from Mainland China which the SARs technically is a part of) and in many cases, independent international representation (as "Hong Kong, China" and "Macau, China"). Although it is believed that for SARs interference from Beijing should be kept to a minimum, it is constitutional for the National People's Congress to freely modify the political system of SARs as long as such system fits the practical needs of said Special Administrative Region.

- Abkhazia
- Albania
- Algeria
- Angola
- Armenia
- Azerbaijan
- Bangladesh
- Barbados
- Belarus
- Benin
- Bolivia
- Botswana
- Bulgaria
- Burkina Faso
- Burundi
- Cameroon
- Cape Verde
- Central African Republic
- Chad
- Chile
- China
- Colombia
- Comoros
- Democratic Republic of the Congo
- Republic of the Congo
- Costa Rica
- Croatia
- Cuba
- Cyprus
- Northern Cyprus
- Czech Republic
- Djibouti
- Dominica
- Dominican Republic
- East Timor
- Ecuador
- Egypt
- El Salvador
- Equatorial Guinea
- Eritrea
- Estonia
- Fiji
- Finland
- France
- Gabon
- Gambia
- Georgia
- Ghana
- Greece
- Guatemala
- Guinea
- Guinea-Bissau
- Guyana
- Haiti
- Honduras
- Hungary
- Iceland
- Indonesia
- Ireland
- Israel
- Italy
- Ivory Coast
- Kazakhstan
- Kenya
- Kiribati
- Kosovo
- Kyrgyzstan
- Laos
- Latvia
- Lebanon
- Liberia
- Libya
- Lithuania
- Madagascar
- Malawi
- Maldives
- Mali
- Malta
- Marshall Islands
- Mauritania
- Mauritius
- Moldova
- Mongolia
- Montenegro
- Mozambique
- Myanmar
- Namibia
- Nauru
- Nicaragua
- Niger
- North Korea
- North Macedonia
- Palau
- Palestine
- Panama
- Paraguay
- Peru
- Philippines
- Poland
- Portugal
- Romania
- Rwanda
- Sahrawi Arab Democratic Republic
- Samoa
- San Marino
- São Tomé and Príncipe
- Senegal
- Serbia
- Seychelles
- Sierra Leone
- Singapore
- Slovakia
- Slovenia
- Somaliland
- South Africa
- South Korea
- South Ossetia
- Sri Lanka
- Suriname
- Syria
- Taiwan
- Tajikistan
- Tanzania
- Togo
- Transnistria
- Trinidad and Tobago
- Tunisia
- Turkey
- Turkmenistan
- Uganda
- Ukraine
- Uruguay
- Uzbekistan
- Vanuatu
- Vietnam
- Yemen
- Zambia
- Zimbabwe

=== Unitary monarchies ===
The United Kingdom is an example of a unitary state. Scotland, Wales and Northern Ireland have a degree of autonomous devolved power, but such power is delegated by the Parliament of the United Kingdom, which can enact laws unilaterally altering devolution. Since the passing of the Scotland Act 2016, and a similar Act relating to Wales the following year, the permanency of both the Scottish Parliament and Welsh Parliament were guaranteed, and their abolition could only be possible if the majority of their respective population electorates voted in favour as such in a legally recognised referendum. Similarly in Spain, the devolved powers are delegated through the central government.

- Andorra
- Antigua and Barbuda
- Bahamas
- Bahrain
- Belize
- Bhutan
- Brunei
- Cambodia
- Kingdom of Denmark
- Eswatini
- Grenada
- Jamaica
- Japan
- Jordan
- Kuwait
- Lesotho
- Liechtenstein
- Luxembourg
- Monaco
- Morocco
- Kingdom of the Netherlands
- New Zealand
- Norway
- Oman
- Papua New Guinea
- Qatar
- Saint Lucia
- Saint Vincent and the Grenadines
- Saudi Arabia
- Solomon Islands
- Spain
- Sweden
- Thailand
- Tonga
- Tuvalu
- United Kingdom
- Vatican City

=== Unitary states with a unique form of government ===
- Afghanistan (theocracy)
- Iran (theocracy with a presidential republic)

== List of former unitary states ==
- Belgium (1830–1993)
- Brazil (1822–1889)
- Bosnia and Herzegovina (1992–1995)
- Comoros (1975–1978)
- Czechoslovakia (1918–1968)
- Ethiopia (1270–1995)
- Germany (1933-1945)
- Iraq (1932–2005)
- Nepal (1768–2008)
- Republic of Texas (1836–1846)
- Somalia (1960–2004)
- Kingdom of Yugoslavia (1918–1941)

== See also ==
- Centralized government
- Constitutional economics
- Political economy
- Regional state
- Rule according to higher law
- Unicameralism
- Unitary authority
