= Michel Hockx =

Dutch sinologist (born 1964)

- Other name: 贺麦晓
- Education: Leiden University (PhD)
- Occupation: Dutch sinologist
- Employer: University of Notre Dame

Michel Hockx (born 1964) is a Dutch sinologist currently serving as professor of Chinese Literature in the Department of East Asian Languages and Cultures and founding Director of the Liu Institute for Asia and Asian Studies at the University of Notre Dame's Keough School of Global Affairs. Hockx previously was a professor of Chinese at SOAS University of London and founding director of the SOAS China Institute.

== Early life and education ==
Hockx was born in the Netherlands. He holds a PhD in Chinese literature from Leiden University.

== Academic career ==
Hockx has published widely, both in English and in Chinese, on topics related to modern Chinese poetry and literary culture, especially early 20th-century Chinese magazine literature and print culture and contemporary Internet literature. He is the author of Questions of Style: Literary Societies and Literary Journals in Modern China, 1911-1937, which focuses on how the style of Republican-era Chinese literature was shaped by the context in which it was produced. His recent book, Internet Literature in China, was listed by Choice magazine as one of the “Top 25 Outstanding Academic Titles of 2015.” In December 2016, Hockx's first book A Snowy Morning was made freely available to download under an Open Access license.

Hockx contends that a narrow view of censorship in China as a "polluting factor" fails to account for how the technological and political affordances and constraints are an integral part of producing cultural works in China and elsewhere, and that these dynamics existed before the digital age.

Hocks proposes that twentieth century Chinese literature should be analyzed through the Chinese experience of the "careful balancing act between striving for critical recognition (symbolic capital), for political efficacy without sacrificing independence (political capital) and for discreet money-making (economic capital)."

Using the example of Lu Xun and the May Fourth Movement, Hockx observes that modern Chinese writers have been motivated to consider, as part of their practice, the well-being of the country and their people."

== Publications ==
- A Snowy Morning: Eight Chinese Poets on the Road to Modernity, 282pp. : Leiden University. Published in 1994, ISBN 90-73782-21-X.
- Questions of Style: Literary Societies and Literary Journals in Modern China, 1911–1937, 310pp. : Brill (Netherlands). Published in 2003, ISBN 90-04-12915-4.
- Internet Literature in China, 272pp. : Columbia University Press. Published in 2015, ISBN 0231160828.
- Literature and Censorship in Modern China (2026), Routledge. ISBN 978-1-032-77583-8
