= Cake theory =

Chinese political metaphor

Cake theory (simplified Chinese: 蛋糕论; traditional Chinese: 蛋糕論; pinyin: dàngāo lùn) is a metaphor about economic development and the redistribution of wealth in the political discourse of China. It emerged in 2010 as problems with an increased wealth gap became gradually more apparent. If economic development is seen as analogous to baking a cake, one side of the debate suggests that development should focus on "dividing the cake more fairly (fair cake-cutting)", while the other says development should be focused on "baking a bigger cake (growing the pie)".

== Synopsis ==
Thirty years of economic growth in China has resulted in higher standards of living and a substantial growth in national income, but also led to a widening wealth gap and associated social problems. Conflicts are emerging between the haves and have-nots of society. The nouveau riche are seen as variously the beneficiaries of their hard work and enterprising character under the new market economy, or as cheaters of the system and inheritors of unfair privilege. At the third session of the 11th National People's Congress, then-Premier Wen Jiabao remarked that "we must develop our economy to make the cake that is prosperity bigger, but also use a reasonable system to distribute the cake fairly."

To deal with the increasingly sharp conflicts between different interest groups, the Chinese Communist Party was said to have split ideologically over the "cake issue". On one side, orthodox communists suggest that the solution is to focus on distributing the wealth while pursuing higher growth ("dividing the cake"), while reformers and liberals suggest that the solution is to pursue continued growth and worry about dividing the wealth once the material wealth threshold is reached ("baking a bigger cake").

The ideological cleavage surfaced publicly in a war of words in late 2011, when then-Chinese Communist Party Committee Secretary for Guangdong province Wang Yang stated that "one must bake a bigger cake first before dividing it." Wang said that "continued economic development" must take precedence over all other tasks. In response, then-CCP Committee Secretary for Chongqing Bo Xilai remarked, "Some people think [...] that one must bake a large cake before dividing it; but this is wrong in practice. Because if the distribution of the cake is unfair, those who make the cake won't feel motivated to bake it; therefore we can't bake a bigger cake."

The egalitarian "divide-the-cake" approach was an important component of the Chongqing model advanced by politician Bo Xilai. Bo gave residency status to numerous migrant workers in the city, so that they could enjoy the same rights and privileges given to urban residents, such as health care and education. While the "Chongqing Model" won significant accolades from some of China's top leaders, critics remarked that it ultimately became too dependent on the personality of Bo Xilai himself, and thus the expansion of the model to other areas of the country would be difficult.

While the reform oriented and economically liberal "baking-the-cake" commonly associated with Wang Yang in the Guangdong model. Wang has also pressed for more transparency in government spending, and greater rule of law. While pursuing a more market oriented economy where the external market and private sector play key roles.

The metaphor is said to be emblematic of the ideological struggles within the top echelons of China's leadership. It asks the central question of whether further growth or fair distribution should be at the centerpiece of China's political agenda.

== See also ==
- Fair cake-cutting
- Fair division
- Growing the pie
