= A rising tide lifts all boats =

Economical aphorism

"A rising tide lifts all boats" is an aphorism associated with the idea that an improved economy will benefit all participants and that economic policy, particularly government economic policy, should therefore focus on broad economic efforts.

The expression has also been used to highlight economic inequality, with the sentiment that the rising tide is primarily lifting expensive boats such as yachts, by politicians including former U.S. Treasury Secretary Robert Rubin, former British Labour Party Leader Ed Miliband, and former New Zealand Labour Party Deputy Leader David Parker.

== Misattribution to John F. Kennedy ==
The phrase has frequently been misattributed to President John F. Kennedy, who used it in a speech in 1963. In 2009, Kennedy's speechwriter Ted Sorensen revealed in his memoir that the phrase had originated with him, after he noticed it in use as a slogan of the New England Council, a regional chamber of commerce. Subsequently, Kennedy would often borrow it. The organization had used the phrase as the title of a report in 1951, at a time when it was known as "an old New England saying". Kennedy's former trade policy spokesman Michael W. Moynihan is also credited with being the initial drafter of the phrase for a speech Kennedy gave to a trade conference in 1963.

== Origin ==
The phrase may originate from a Christian sermon preached by the English Independent Reverend William Bridge at Stepney in London in 1647.

When there is no water in the river but his own, the tide comes not in, no sea water, only the water of the river, the native water, (as I may so speak) then your bottoms, your ships they stand upon the sands; but when the tide comes in, then they are raised, and come off the sands then.

In the early 20th century the phrase was used to refer to missionary work, sometimes phrased as "the missionary tide lifts every boat", "the rising tide lifts every boat", or "the incoming tide lifts all the boats".

== See also ==
- Decoupling of wages from productivity
- Growing the pie
- Supply-side economics
