= Keough School of Global Affairs =

Global Affairs school at the University of Notre Dame

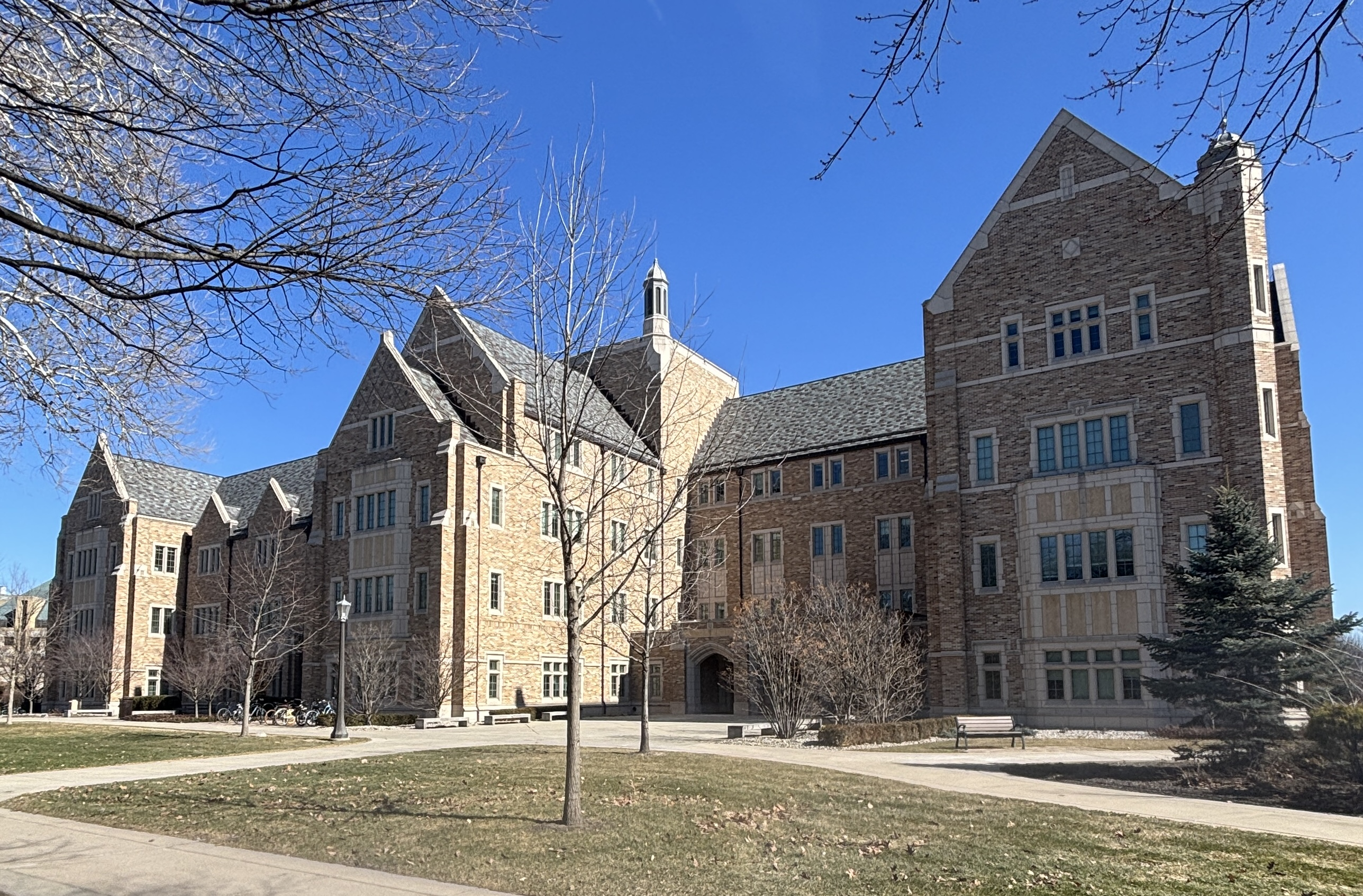
- Jenkins and Nanovic Halls, home of the Keough School of Global Affairs
- Type: Private
- Established: 2014
- Parent institution: University of Notre Dame
- Dean: Mary E. Gallagher
- Undergraduates: 188 (2025)
- Postgraduates: 78 (2021)
- Location: Notre Dame, Indiana; 41.695876°N 86.2376202°W
- Website: keough.nd.edu

The Keough School of Global Affairs is the global affairs school of the University of Notre Dame, a Catholic university founded by the Congregation of Holy Cross. It is the most recently established of the seven schools and colleges that make up the university. The Keough School also maintains an office in Washington, D.C.

== Academics ==
The Keough School of Global Affairs offers the following programs:

=== Undergraduate ===
The school offers a Bachelor of Arts in Global Affairs. In addition, the Keough school offers six undergraduate minors and supplementary majors.

=== Postgraduate ===
The Master of Global Affairs at the Keough School is a two-year master's degree with three possible majors: governance and policy, sustainable development, and international peace studies.

=== Doctoral ===
There are two PhD programs within the school. The first is a PhD in sustainable development. The second is a PhD in peace studies. Students can also pursue a joint PhD in peace studies and anthropology, history, political science, psychology, sociology, or theology.

== Institutes ==
There are nine institutes and centers within the Keough School of Global Affairs.

=== Ansari Institute ===
The Rafat and Zoreen Ansari Institute for Global Engagement with Religion was founded in 2017. It offers the Undergraduate Religion and Global Affairs Concentration within the global affairs supplementary major. The institute focuses on interaction between and the research of different religious groups. The current director is R. Scott Appleby.

The Ansari Institute helps facilitate inter-religious dialogue between those in the religious communities, with the goals of promoting inter-religious tolerance and learning from a variety of religions in order to work towards the common good, advancing not only the interests of the institute, but the interests of the Keough School of Global Affairs as well as the goals of the university as a whole.

=== Kellogg Institute ===
The Kellogg Institute for International Studies was founded in 1982. The institute focuses on researching issues that affect the developing world. The current director is Aníbal Pérez-Liñán.

The Kellogg Institute is a multidisciplinary community of students and scholars conducting research about democracy and human development. The institute has members that focus on countries around the globe, but there is an emphasis on Latin America and Africa. Through the Kellogg Institute, there are numerous opportunities for students to engage in international research, including the Kellogg International Scholars Program, the International Development Studies minor, and the Kellogg Developing Researchers Program. They are also the hosts of the Human Development Conference, a student-led conference highlighting student research on the intersection of democracy and human development.

=== Keough-Naughton Institute ===
The Keough-Naughton Institute for Irish Studies researches Irish culture. It was founded in 1992 and became a part of the Keough school in 2015. Within the institute is the Clingen Family Center for the Study of Modern Ireland. The current director is Colin Barr.

In 2006 it was renamed after a further donation from Irish businessman Martin Naughton. At the undergraduate level, it offers many courses and a minor in Irish Studies. It also offers a minor for Ph.D. students of English or History. The institute is located of the university's Global gateway in Dublin, which is based at O'Connell House, a late eighteenth-century building on Merrion Square, which enables students to study abroad in Ireland. The institute also runs Irish internships which offer Dublin-based summer positions. In the summer, the institute hosts The IRISH Seminar, a weeks-long seminar that focuses on Irish cultural, intellectual, and political debates. In addition to the Irish students on campus full time, Notre Dame welcomes Irish students for a semester or in some cases a year. Many come from Dublin City University, Trinity College Dublin, University College Cork, University College Dublin, and University of Galway.

=== Klau Institute ===
The Klau Institute for Civil and Human Rights was founded in 1973 as The Center for Civil Rights; it became a part of the Keough School when the latter was created. The institute has a particular focus on racial issues in the United States and abroad. The current director is Jennifer Mason McAward.

=== Kroc Institute ===
The Kroc Institute for International Peace Studies was founded in 1986 and was a part of the College of Arts and Letters until the Keough School was founded. Research focuses on strategies to maintain peace and justice. The current director is Asher Kaufman. The University of Notre Dame's Kroc Institute for International Peace Studies is a center for the study of the causes of violent conflict and strategies for sustainable peace. Kroc institute faculty and fellows conduct interdisciplinary research on topics related to peace and justice. The Kroc Institute offers an undergraduate program, a master's in International Peace Studies, and a Ph.D. program. It was founded in 1986 through the donations of Joan B. Kroc, the widow of McDonald's founder Ray Kroc. The institute was inspired by the vision of Rev. Theodore M. Hesburgh CSC, President Emeritus of the University of Notre Dame. The institute has contributed to international policy discussions about peace building practices, including the Colombian peace process.

=== Liu Institute ===
The Liu Institute for Asia and Asian Studies was founded in 2013. The institute focuses on researching topics involving Asia and its diaspora. The current director is Michel Hockx.

The Liu Institute provides a hub for multidisciplinary research and education on Asia as well as its diaspora, including by hosting public events and promoting international exchanges.

=== McKenna Center ===
The McKenna Center for Human Development and Global Business focuses on researching the social value of business. The current director is Ray Offenheiser.

=== Pulte Institute ===
The Pulte Institute for Global Development was founded in 2012 as the Notre Dame Initiative for Global Development. Its main research focus is solutions to poverty, injustice, and inequality. The current director is Tracy Kijewski-Correa.

== Deans ==
- R. Scott Appleby 2014-2024
- Mary E. Gallagher 2024-present
