= Apportionment by country =

Setting of electoral boundaries

Apportionment by country describes the practices used in various democratic countries around the world for partitioning seats in the parliament among districts or parties. See apportionment (politics) for the general principles and issues related to apportionment.

== Australia ==
The Australian House of Representatives consists of 151 single-member seats, referred to as constituencies, electorates, or electoral divisions. Seats are apportioned between the states and territories according to a formula based on population, but each state is constitutionally guaranteed a minimum of five seats. Tasmania is the only state affected by this clause; as such, while electorates in other states average around 105,000 to 125,000 voters, Tasmania's electorates average around 73,000 to 80,000 voters. Federal electoral boundaries are regulated by the Australian Electoral Commission (AEC), which regularly redistributes seats and boundaries to reflect changes in population. Since 1974, federal electorates within each state may not vary in population by more than 10%, largely preventing malapportionment. The Constitution of Australia states that the size of the House of Representatives must be, “as nearly as practicable”, twice the number of senators. Accordingly, the House has periodically been expanded along with the Senate, from 76 seats in 1901 to its present size of 151 seats.

In the Australian Senate, each state is represented by 12 senators. Tasmania, with a population of 534,000, elects the same number of senators as New South Wales, with a population of almost 8.1 million. Equal representation of the states in the Senate is written into the Constitution, intended to protect the interests of smaller states. Amending the Constitution to repeal the equal representation can only be done through a national referendum. However, the specific number of Senate seats allocated to the States is not constitutionally defined, and can be modified by legislation. Starting from six seats for each state in 1901, it was increased to 10 in 1948, then to 12 in 1984. Territories are not guaranteed Senate representation by the Constitution, and were unrepresented until 1975, when legislation was passed granting each territory two seats in the Senate. The Senate's present size is 76 seats.

There has been malapportionment of electorates in both the federal and state parliaments in the past, typically in the form of rural areas receiving disproportionately more seats than urban areas. Supporters of these arrangements claimed Australia's urban population dominates the countryside, and that these practices gave fair representation to country people. Such systems were in place in Queensland from 1949 to 1991, Western Australia from 1907 to 2007, and South Australia from 1856 to 1968. In Queensland, the state was divided into four electoral regions between which constituencies were distributed, with rural areas receiving disproportionately high representation. In WA, the area around Perth was limited to a maximum of 60% of seats, despite containing a much larger share of the population. In SA, the constitution stated that rural areas must have twice as many seats as Adelaide and its suburbs, despite the large majority of the population residing in the city. These systems allowed the Country Party of Queensland (later named the National Party) in Queensland and the Liberal and Country League in SA to retain majorities in Parliament despite losing the popular vote, sometimes by a substantial margin. In SA, a less significant system of malapportionment remained until 1991, when it was repealed by referendum. (See: Australian electoral system#Gerrymandering and malapportionment.)

== Canada ==
In Canada, each federal electoral district ("riding") is represented by one Member of Parliament (MP). Ridings are based on population, but each territory is also given an MP; so Nunavut receives one MP even though its population in 2006 was only 29,474.

Certain provisions in the Constitution and law (the "grandfather clause" and the "senatorial clause") guarantee that provinces cannot have fewer MPs than they had in 1982. The apportionment method is to grant one MP to each territory, and allocate 279 other MPs according to population among the 10 provinces. After doing so, the provinces with slower historical population growth since joining the Confederation receive extra ridings so as not to lose MPs. After the 1991 Census, 19 extra ridings were created, making a total of 301. After the 2001 Census, seven more ridings were created, making a total of 308.

That ridings were not eliminated but only added created huge disparities. For example, in 2006 the Peace River riding in Alberta had a population of 138,009, whilst Charlottetown riding in Prince Edward Island had a population of 32,174; yet both ridings received equal representation in the House of Commons. Rural ridings even in populous provinces also tended to have more constituents than urban ridings.

The Fair Representation Act, passed in 2011 and effective for the federal election that took place in 2015, specified a uniform "electoral quotient" of 111,166 (to be readjusted after each future census) but again ensured that no province would lose ridings, increasing the size of the House of Commons to 338.

== European Parliament ==
The apportionment of seats in the European Parliament between European Union member states uses a principle of degressive proportionality; those with larger population have more Members of the European Parliament (MEPs) but a higher population per MEP. The exact apportionment is specified by negotiated treaty. While most member states elect their MEPs from a single national constituency, six are subdivided into multiple European Parliament constituencies. Those of France, Ireland, and Italy have low variance in population per MEP, as did the UK with Northern Ireland as an outlier, before the country's exit from the EU in 2020. Poland's vary from 559,000 in Warsaw to 1,326,000 in Podlaskie and Warmian-Masurian, the latter figure higher than in any of the states with larger populations. Belgium's division into "electoral colleges" is not strictly geographic, but rather by language community, such that voters in the officially bilingual Brussels-Capital Region can vote in either the Dutch-speaking or French-speaking electoral college. The single-MEP German-speaking electoral college significantly overrepresents the German-speaking Community of Belgium.

== Japan ==
Since electoral system of Shugiin was changed to Parallel voting in 1994, each prefecture has been guaranteed one seat apportionment regardless of its population. This apportionment method was called "separated one method" and the supreme court judged that the system was under unconstitutional state in 2009, 2012, and 2016.

In 2017, electoral districts were rearranged so that every district does not have twice as large population as another district.

== Kazakhstan ==
In the lower chamber Mäjilis, 29 out of total seats are apportioned in the administrative-territorial units which includes regions, cities of republican significance, and the capital of Astana. Each subdivision is guaranteed to have at least one representative district. The redistribution of boundaries is based on the number of registered voters in each legislative district, with the requirement that the difference in the number of voters does not exceed 20% of the average number of voters per seat in the specific administrative-territorial unit within the districts of the region.

== Malaysia ==
The voters in rural districts are over-represented in Malaysia while the urban districts are under-represented. The largest parliamentary seat (Kapar) is nine times larger than the smallest one (Putrajaya). On average, the rural parliamentary seats are over-represented by six times compared to the urban seats.

== New Zealand ==
Between 1881 and 1945 New Zealand applied a system of malapportionment called the country quota, which required urban districts to contain more people than rural ones but did not give them any equivalent increase in representation.

== Norway ==
Out of the 169 seats in the Storting, 150 are apportioned among the 11 Counties of Norway with deliberate bias in favor of rural areas. The number of seats for a county is decided using a formula in which a county receives 1 point for every inhabitant and 1.8 points for every square kilometer of land area. However, the bias is reduced by the 19 compensation seats, which are given to parties that are underrepresented. Thus the system does not have a great effect on the partisan composition of the Storting, but does result in more MPs coming from rural counties. Electoral researcher Bernt Aardal calculated that if the 2009 parliamentary election had been conducted without this bias, the Labour Party and Progress Party would both have lost a seat, while the Red Party and Liberal Party would each have gained one, reducing the majority of the Red-Green Coalition from 3 seats to 1.

== Portugal ==
The Portuguese unicameral parliament is called Assembly of the Republic and consists of 230 members elected from 22 multi-member electoral constituencies. Of these, four are apportioned to the two constituencies representing the Portuguese expats, each getting two members: Europe and Outside Europe respectively. The remaining 226 members are apportioned proportionally by number of electors, according to the d'Hondt method, among the 18 districts in mainland Portugal and the two archipelagoes that form autonomous regions.

Each constituency's seats are apportioned proportionally to votes, according to the d'Hondt method, among the running parties' closed lists.

== Slovakia ==
The difference in electorates between the districts was a matter before the Constitutional Court and UN Human Rights Committee, both of which found the rights of a candidate not elected in a district with larger electorate to be violated, but did not request new elections.

== South Africa ==
In the South African general election of 1948, South Africa's constituency boundaries meant that sparsely populated rural constituencies in the Afrikaner heartland had relatively few eligible voters compared to the urban constituencies in Cape Town. The rural electorates often strongly supported the Reunited National Party, led by Daniel Malan and the urban electorates often supported Jan Christiaan Smuts' United Party (the incumbent prime minister and his party, 90% of whose seats were urban). The 1948 general election saw the Reunited National Party winning more seats than the United Party, meaning that Malan was able to form a government bilaterally with the Afrikaner Party and gain an absolute majority in parliament. This was despite the fact the United Party had won 49% of the vote compared to 38% for Malan's party. By comparison, the British general election of 1945 was also conducted under first past the post but with more equal constituencies, and produced a landslide victory for a party which received 47% of the vote. Malapportionment was a key tool that allowed the National Party to implement its Apartheid program within the notionally democratic parliament.

== Spain ==
The Spanish Congress of Deputies consists of 350 members. Each Spanish province is a constituency entitled to an initial minimum of two seats for a total of 100 seats, while the North African enclaves of Ceuta and Melilla are allocated one member each. The remaining 248 seats are allocated among the fifty provinces in proportion to their populations. The result is that the smaller provinces are virtually guaranteed a minimum of three seats and have a disproportionate share of seats relative to their electorate. For example, in 2004, Spain had 34,571,831 voters, an average of 98,777 voters per deputy. However, the number of voters per deputy varied from 129,269 in Barcelona and 127,377 in Madrid to 38,714 and 26,177 respectively in the smallest provinces of Teruel and Soria.

In the Spanish Senate each of the forty-seven mainland provinces are assigned four seats, while the three largest islands are allocated three seats each, and the seven smaller islands one each. The North African enclaves of Ceuta and Melilla are allocated two seats each. Additionally, the legislative assemblies of the seventeen autonomous communities into which the provinces of Spain are grouped are entitled to appoint at least one Senator each, as well as one senator for every million voters. The result is a bias in favour of mainly rural areas. For example, the community of Madrid with 4,458,540 voters in 2004 has 9 senators while Castilla y León with 2,179,521 voters has a total of 39 senators.

== United Kingdom ==
The number of electors in a United Kingdom constituency can vary considerably. This variation has resulted from:

- Legislation; beginning with the Redistribution of Seats Act 1958, which replaced an electoral quota (ideal population) for the whole United Kingdom with four separate quotas: England 69,534; Northern Ireland 67,145, Wales 58,383, and Scotland 54,741 voters per constituency.
- Decisions of the four UK Boundary Commissions to favour geographically "natural" districts.
- Population migrations between boundary reviews, which have tended to decrease the number of voters in inner-city districts

From the next General Election the maximum disparity in size of local electorates will be less, about fourfold, from Scotland's Na h-Eileanan an Iar (21,837 voters) and Orkney and Shetland (33,755), to England's East Ham (91,531), and the Isle of Wight (110,924).

Variation in UK constituency sizes
| | AVG electors | % Variation in electors (standard deviation) | Smallest seat (as % of average) | Largest seat (as % of average) | % of seats within 5% of national limit | % of seats within 10% of national limit |
|---|---|---|---|---|---|---|
| 2010 | 70,150 | 11.1 | 32 | 157 | 37 | 69 |
| 2013 proposal | 76,408 | 2.2 | 29 | 105 | 99 | 99.5 |
| 2015 | 69,016 | 11.3 | 32 | 153 | 41 | 68 |
| 2017 | 70,997 | 11.8 | 30 | 155 | 37 | 67 |
| 2019 | | | | | | |

Periodic reviews by the Boundary Commissions are submitted to the House of Commons for approval, primarily to prevent the reemergence of any new rotten boroughs. The House is allowed to ignore or delay implementation of their findings, but not change them. The Sixth Periodic Review of Westminster constituencies, instigated to reduce the number of MPs from 650 to 600 and address the current malapportionment, was suspended until after the 2015 and 2017 general elections, by votes of the House in 2013 and 2016.

== United States ==
Apportionment at the federal level of the United States government is guided by the rubrics of the U.S. Constitution. The writers of the Constitution designed the nation's bicameral Legislature to include, a Senate (the upper legislative chamber) to represent the states, and a House of Representatives (the lower legislative chamber) to represent the people rather than the states. Each state—in its entirety—is equally represented in the Senate by two senators, regardless of its population. The constitution guarantees each state at least one representative for its people in the House, while the size of a state's House delegation depends on its total population. Each state is apportioned a number of seats which approximately corresponds to its share of the aggregate population of the 50 states, as determined by the most recent decennial U.S. census. This governance plan came about as a result of the Connecticut Compromise reached during Constitutional Convention of 1787 between delegates from states with a large population and those from states with a small population. The Constitution also prescribes that the President and Vice President be elected by a group of people apportioned among the states in the same numbers as their representatives in Congress, called the Electoral College.

As the Constitution's apportionment procedures are established solely for the states in the Union, neither the District of Columbia nor the country's territories are included. Therefore, they do not have the same representation in the federal government as states do.

=== Senate ===
Under Article I, Section 3, of the U.S. Constitution, each state has two seats in the Senate. This equality of representation is shielded from being amended by Article V which specifies that no state, without its consent, shall be deprived of having the same number of seats as the others. (Neither the District of Columbia, nor the country's territories and possessions have representation in the Senate, as they are not states.)

Senators from each state were originally elected by that state's legislature, and influenced only indirectly by the voters, through their election of state legislators. The 17th Amendment, ratified in 1913, provided for direct election of U.S. Senators. It did not however, change the principle of equal representation of the states in the Senate, which, as James Madison noted in The Federalist No. 39, ensures a polity of mixed sovereignty, one in which the states are an integral part of the federal government. This, of course, is precisely why those who think the Constitution not democratic enough would wish to remove that portion of the Constitution. The 38 million people who live in the nation's 22 least populous states are represented by 44 senators, while the 38 million residents of California, the most populous state, are represented by two.

=== House ===
2 U.S.C. § 2a, based on the Reapportionment Act of 1929, reapportions the Representatives to the states following each decennial census. It left the states to decide how and whether to redistrict, except in the case that the census changes the state's number of Representatives, but federal court cases now require states to redistrict based on each census.

However, here too, other criteria take precedence over exact equality of representation. In 2012, the Supreme Court endorsed Tennant v. Jefferson County the use of other criteria, including the legislature's reluctance to move voters between districts, to put incumbent Congressmen in the same district, and to divide counties between districts, when the State of West Virginia redrew its three Congressional districts with a disparity of 0.79% between the most populous and least populous district.

Washington, D.C. and the five territories are instead represented by non-voting delegates. These delegates may vote on legislation in committee but not on floor votes for enactment.

=== President ===
The U.S. president is elected only indirectly by voters, through the Electoral College. Under Article II, Section 1, Clause 2, of the U.S. Constitution, the number of electors for every state is the sum of the number of that state's senators and representatives. This was also a result of the original Connecticut Compromise between large and small states. The effect is to give each state a two-elector bonus (for the state's two senators) regardless of population. A low-population state does not receive one elector in a body of 435, but three electors out of 535. The two-elector bonus is comparatively minor for a state with a high population.

Washington, D.C., did not have a voice in the selection of the president until 1961, when the 23rd Amendment was ratified, giving D.C. the treatment of a state in the Electoral College ("but in no event more than the least populous State"; that is, three electors, increasing the total number of electors to 538).

U.S. territories still have no voice in the selection of the President. In 2000, Puerto Rico attempted to include the U.S. presidential election on its ballots, knowing that the Electoral College would not count its result. However, the move was declared unconstitutional by the First Circuit Court of Appeals, and the Presidential ballot was not handed out to voters on election day.

A separate obstacle to proportional representation is that almost all of the states choose electors on a winner-take-all basis, where the state's electors are awarded to the candidate with the most popular votes in that state. Maine and Nebraska are the only states that instead use the congressional district method, selecting one elector within each congressional district by popular vote and awarding two electors by a statewide popular vote. With the "winner-takes-all" method used by most of the states, a candidate can still win the presidency without winning the national popular vote (such as what happened in 1824, 1876, 1888, 2000, and 2016).

The Electoral College denies voters equal influence in the presidential election. It encourages political campaigners to focus on so-called swing states while ignoring the rest of the country where the outcome is widely expected. States in which polling shows no clear favorite are usually inundated with campaign visits, television advertising, get-out-the-vote efforts by party organizers and debates, while four out of five voters in the national election are "absolutely ignored," according to one assessment.

In the event that the Electoral College does not produce a majority for any candidate, the 12th Amendment (roughly as Article II, Section 1 had done) throws the election to the U.S. House (the U.S. Senate choosing the Vice President), but under a procedure where each state's delegation, regardless of size, casts one vote—thus giving smaller states more voting power in the event of a deadlock than larger states. For example, Wyoming, with only one representative, has the same power as California, with 53 representatives.

=== State legislatures ===
In most states, the legislature draws the boundaries of electoral districts, including its own, and even court decisions that set aside malapportionment acknowledge that political self-interest plays a role in decisions of the legislature. Legislatures and the majority party can pursue self-interest by gerrymandering—contriving legislative districts to promote the election of specific individuals or to concentrate the opposition party's core constituencies in a small number of districts. Historically some states simply declined to reapportion at all, so that the make-up of a legislature failed to track the evolving demographics of the state. All states now redistrict state electoral districts following each decennial federal census, as Reynolds v. Sims required for Congressional districts.

The United States government was a construct of the thirteen states, and the Constitution's only original constraint on the states was, in Article IV, Section 4, that the federal government "guarantee to every state... a republican form of government." Though the Fourteenth Amendment contains the Equal Protection Clause and bars the states from "abridging" voting rights, the text does not address apportionment.

Instead, most state legislatures imitated the Congress, in which the lower house is apportioned by population, while the upper house is apportioned by some other criterion. For example, each county might have one state senator. In the 1960s, in cases such as Baker v. Carr and Reynolds v. Sims (the "one man, one vote" decision), the U.S. Supreme Court ruled that the Equal Protection Clause authorized judicial remedy when a significant disparity in population size arises between electoral districts within a state. The biggest immediate effect was to require that state senate districts have substantially equal populations, as Chief Justice Earl Warren wrote, "Legislators represent people, not trees or acres." These cases also opened apportionment of state houses of representatives to review by the judiciary.

A state may draw districts that span political subdivisions and elect multiple representatives, and may draw floterial districts.

The basis of apportionment has also been litigated. In Evenwel v. Abbott (2016), a unanimous Supreme Court ruled that "constitutional history, precedent, and practice" support basing districts on total population rather than voting-eligible population, resulting in inequality of the number of votes cast.

=== Prospects for change ===
Arguments for or against change to these institutions often have political overtones. The Democratic Party often advocates change, as it is generally more popular in large cities and many of the more populated states, while the Republican Party often defends the current system, as that party is more popular in rural areas and many of the less populated states.

Many changes would require amendment of the Constitution. But the procedure for doing this also contains protections for states with low populations. Article V, Section 1 requires any amendments to be ratified by three-fourths of the states (currently 38). Most small states would refuse to ratify any amendment that nullified their traditional advantages.

Several states have joined the National Popular Vote Interstate Compact, pledging that their legislatures will direct their presidential electors to vote for whichever presidential candidate wins the national popular vote. This would partly counteract the advantage the Electoral College gives to low-population states, though it might reduce the joiners' influence during presidential campaigns.
