= Central Xinjiang Work Coordination Group =

Chinese Communist Party body

- 中央新疆工作协调小组
- Emblem of the Chinese Communist Party

Agency overview
- Formed: 2000; 26 years ago
- Type: Policy coordination and consultation body
- Jurisdiction: Chinese Communist Party
- Headquarters: Beijing
- Agency executive: Wang Huning, Director
- Parent agency: Central Committee of the Chinese Communist Party

Central Xinjiang Work Coordination Group
- Simplified Chinese: 中央新疆工作协调小组
- Traditional Chinese: 中央新疆工作協調小組
Transcriptions
Standard Mandarin
- Hanyu Pinyin: Zhōngyāng Xīnjiāng Gōngzuò Xiétiáo Xiǎozǔ

The Central Xinjiang Work Coordination Group is a deliberative and coordinating body established by the Central Committee of the Chinese Communist Party for Xinjiang work. The Central Xinjiang Work Coordination Group has an office responsible for handling the daily work of the Coordination Group. The Office of the Central Xinjiang Work Coordination Group Office is located in the United Front Work Department.

== History ==
The group was established in 2000, led by the Central Political and Legal Affairs Commission, and composed of multiple departments including the CCP Central Committee, the State Council, the People's Armed Police and the Xinjiang Uygur Autonomous Region. It was established to strengthen the central leadership's control over Xinjiang work. On April 29, 2003, the Central Xinjiang Work Coordination Group held its first meeting.

== Functions ==
The Group is the Central Committee's deliberative and coordinating body on Xinjiang work. The Coordination Group does not have corresponding deliberative and coordinating bodies at the local level.

The Office of the Group is responsible for "situation assessment, policy research, coordination and guidance, supervision and inspection". The Office of the Coordinating Group was initially located in the Central Political and Legal Affairs Commission, with the director concurrently serving as the director of the Central Political and Legal Affairs Commission's office. Since 2013, the Office was relocated to the National Ethnic Affairs Commission, with the director of the office serving as the director of the National Ethnic Affairs Commission.

== Leadership ==
The Central Xinjiang Work Coordination Group has a leader, deputy leaders and members. Since its establishment, the Coordinating Group has been consistently led by a member of the Politburo Standing Committee. Before 2013, the Coordination Group was led by the secretary of the Central Political and Legal Affairs Commission. Since 2013, it has been led by the chairman of the Chinese People's Political Consultative Conference.

Head of the Central Xinjiang Work Coordination Group

1. Luo Gan (2003–2008)
2. Zhou Yongkang (2008–2013)
3. Yu Zhengsheng (2013–2018)
4. Wang Yang (2018–2023)
5. Wang Huning (2023-)

Deputy Head of the Central Xinjiang Work Coordination Group

1. Hui Liangyu (2003–2013, Vice Premier of the State Council)
2. Wang Lequan (2003–2010, Secretary of the Xinjiang Uygur Autonomous Region Party Committee and concurrently
3. Meng Jianzhu (2008–2013, State Councilor and Minister of Public Security)

Director of the Office of the Central Xinjiang Work Coordination Group

1. Wang Zhengwei (2013–2016, Vice Chairman of the National Committee of the Chinese People's Political Consultative Conference, Deputy Minister of the Central United Front Work Department, and Director of the State Ethnic Affairs Commission)
2. Shi Dagang (2018–2019)
3. Shi Jun (2006–2011, Deputy Minister of the United Front Work Department of the CPC Central Committee)

Deputy Director of the Office of the Central Xinjiang Work Coordination Group

1. Du Ying (August 2014 - concurrently deputy director of the National Committee of the Chinese People's Political Consultative Conference on Ethnic and Religious Affairs)
2. Lu Xin (January 2005 - January 2006, former Vice Minister of the Ministry of Education)
3. Li Zhao (2009–2010, concurrently deputy director and Deputy Secretary of the Party Committee of the State Ethnic Affairs Commission)
