= Guangdong model =

Social, political and economic policies adopted in Guangdong, China

- Location of Guangdong
- Simplified Chinese: 广东模式
- Traditional Chinese: 廣東模式
Transcriptions
Standard Mandarin
- Hanyu Pinyin: Guǎngdōng móshì

The Guangdong model refers to a series of social, political, and economic policies adopted in the southern Chinese province of Guangdong. It is generally associated with Guangdong's Chinese Communist Party Committee Secretary and Politburo member Wang Yang. The Guangdong model is characterized as being comparatively liberal in its economic and social policies, and is frequently contrasted with the Chongqing model, which emphasizes the role of the state.

== Description ==
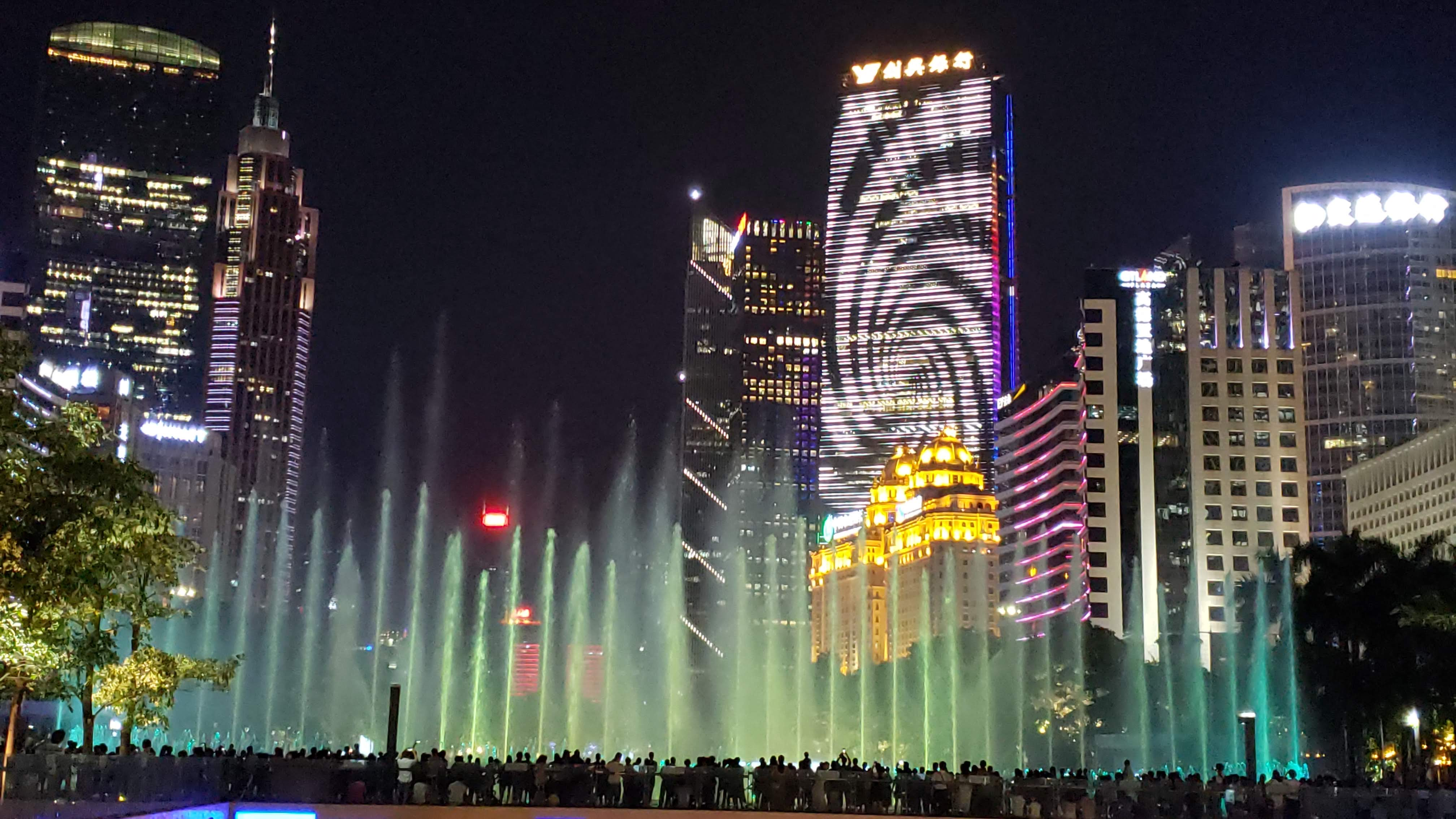
Guangzhou Tianhe CBD, the capital of Guangdong.

Among the central features of the Guangdong model is the greater role it allows for civil society, including NGOs and trade unions. Trade unions are generally regarded with ire by Chinese authorities, and are run by Chinese Communist Party cadres. During his tenure, however, Wang Yang prodded unions to more actively advocate for workers' rights and engage in collective bargaining. This approach was displayed during a series of strikes in the Pearl River Delta in 2010. Chinese authorities frequently view protests and strikes as a threat to political stability to be suppressed. By contrast, Wang expressed sympathy with the protesters, and the strikes were settled with substantial pay increases for the workers. Under the Guangdong model, non-government organizations face less stringent restrictions than elsewhere in the country, with several categories of NGOs being allowed to register without sponsorship from a government agency. Wang has also pressed for more transparency in government spending, and greater rule of law.

Whereas the Chongqing model pioneered by Wang's political rival Bo Xilai emphasized the equitable distribution of wealth, Wang Yang stressed overall economic growth. Wang sought to achieve this by encouraging private enterprise and small-and medium businesses, as well as by implementing economic reforms that moved the province up the "technology value chain."

== Reception ==
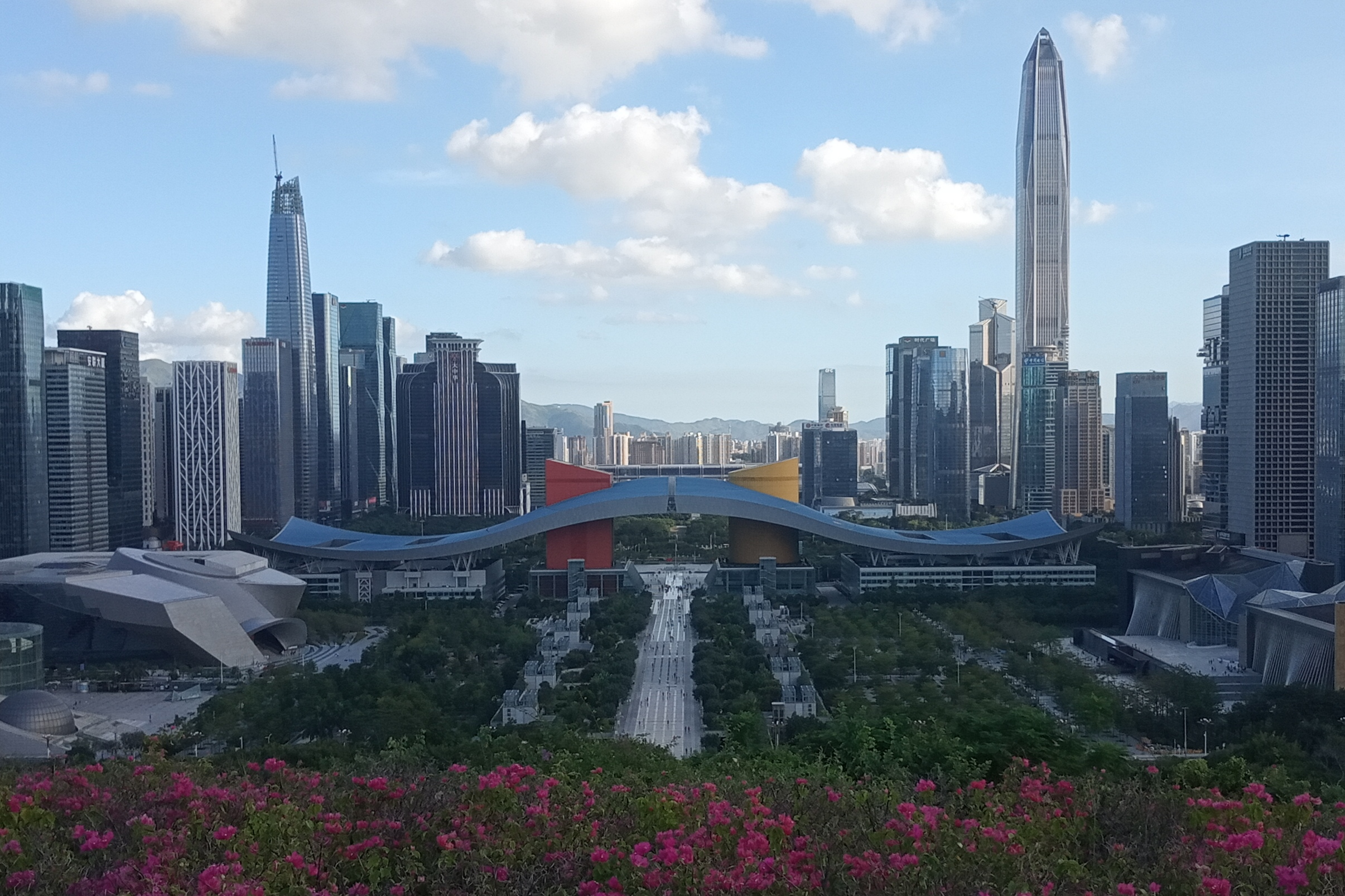
Shenzhen Futian CBD

Although the Guangdong model is heavily touted by proponents, Wang Yang himself is reluctant to use the term. Moreover, many of the policies and approaches that comprise the model are not unique to Wang's tenure; Guangdong province is, historically, among the more economically open provinces in China and was the location for some of the first special economic zones of China. As noted by Xiao Bin, a professor of public affairs at Sun Yat-sen University, the Guangdong model has been evolving since the start of China's economic reforms in the late 1970s and 1980s.

== See also ==
- Cake theory
- 2012 Wukan municipal election
- Chongqing model
