= Chongqing model =

Model of social and economic policies in Chongqing, China

- Location of Chongqing
- Simplified Chinese: 重庆模式
- Traditional Chinese: 重慶模式
Transcriptions
Standard Mandarin
- Hanyu Pinyin: Chóngqìng móshì

The "Chongqing model" was a series of social and economic policies adopted in the Chinese megalopolis of Chongqing. It is most closely associated with Bo Xilai, who served as the Chinese Communist Party (CCP) committee secretary for the city from 2007 to 2012, though some policies were put in place by Bo's predecessors.

The Chongqing model was characterized in part by increased state control and the promotion of a neo-leftist ideology. It involved a sweeping and sometimes extrajudicial campaign against organized crime, and increased the security and police presence in the city. As a means of addressing declining public morality, Bo launched a "red culture" movement to promote Maoist-era socialist ethics. On the economic front, he actively courted foreign investment and focused on manufacturing for domestic consumption. The Chongqing model was also characterized by massive public works programs, subsidized housing for the poor, and social policies intended to make it easier for rural citizens to move to the city.

The Chongqing model represented an alternative model of development which diverged from the policies favored by the reformist faction led by CCP general secretary Hu Jintao and Premier Wen Jiabao, as well as the model put by the Guangdong CCP committee secretary Wang Yang. When Bo Xilai was removed from his posts in the spring of 2012, authorities began a campaign to reverse several of the policies that characterized the Chongqing model, including by cracking down on expressions of "red culture". Individuals, who believed they had been wrongly persecuted under the anti-corruption campaign, also began seeking legal redress.

== Background ==
Bo Xilai, son of Chinese Communist Party (CCP) icon Bo Yibo, was assigned as Communist Party secretary and Politburo member for Chongqing during the 17th Party Congress in October 2007. His predecessor, Wang Yang, was reassigned to helm the CCP in Guangdong province. At the time, Chongqing was reeling from problems such as air and water pollution, unemployment, poor public health, and complications from the Three Gorges Dam. Prior to the appointment, Bo had served as Minister of Commerce. Bo was initially reluctant to assume the Chongqing post, which was widely viewed as a demotion; he had hoped to become vice-premier instead.

Although Bo was initially unhappy about his reassignment as CCP secretary in Chongqing, he soon resolved to use his new position as a staging ground for a return to higher national office. Bo made no secret of his desire to enter the nine-member Politburo Standing Committee (PSC) during the 18th Party Congress in autumn 2012, when seven of the nine members of the PSC—including General Secretary Hu Jintao and Premier Wen Jiabao—were expected to retire. The transition would be an opportunity for the ambitious Bo to join the highest echelon of national leadership, likely as a replacement for ally Zhou Yongkang, head of the party's security apparatus.

Bo used his leadership of Chongqing to pioneer the Chongqing Model—a systematic set of social and economic policies intended to address diverse challenges facing modern China. This included a set of policies promoting social welfare for the poorest groups, the state as the dominant economic force, maintaining public order, and promoting left wing ideology, including the use of campaigns to mobilize the masses, and singing revolutionary songs. The Chongqing model represented a rebuke of the policies favored by the reformist faction dominated by Wen Jiabao and Hu Jintao. It is also frequently contrasted with the Guangdong model championed by Bo's predecessor and political opponent Wang Yang. Whereas the Chongqing model placed emphasized the role of the state in economic and social life, the Guangdong model is characterized by comparatively liberal economic and political policies.

=== Crackdown on organized crime ===
Bo's tenure in Chongqing was dominated by a protracted war ostensibly against organized crime and corruption known as "Striking Black" ("Da Hei"). Since 2009, an estimated 5,700 people were arrested in the sweeping campaign that ensnared not only criminals, but also businessmen, members of the police force, judges, government officials, and political adversaries who were accused of corruption or criminal collaboration. The campaign was overseen by police chief and vice mayor Wang Lijun, whom Bo had worked with previously in Liaoning province. Reports from the Jamestown Foundation suggest the initiative was given approval by general secretary Hu Jintao, and Bo struck a careful balance between claiming credit for the campaign and praising Beijing's leadership in the crackdown on crime.

The Striking Black campaign earned Bo national recognition and widespread popularity in Chongqing—all the more because of the city's reputation as a center for criminal activity. The apparent success of Bo's campaign raised Bo's national and international profile and resulted in calls for a nationwide campaign based on his experiences in Chongqing. Through the campaign, Bo gained the support of a number of powerful members of the Politburo Standing Committee, including Wu Bangguo, Jia Qinglin, Li Changchun, Xi Jinping, and Zhou Yongkang, all of whom visited Chongqing or praised Bo's achievements sometime between 2010 and 2011.

Bo's measures were criticized for neglecting due process and contributing to the erosion of the rule of law. "By all accounts," wrote Stanley Lubman in The Wall Street Journal, the campaign "involved misuse of both the courts and the police." Individuals targeted in the campaign were arbitrarily detained by the authorities, with an estimated 1,000 being sent to forced labor. Lawyers for the accused were reportedly intimidated; one lawyer was sentenced to 18 months in prison. Allegations also surfaced over the use of torture to extract confessions. Moreover, many of those targeted in the campaign were not criminals, but businessmen and political rivals whose assets were reportedly seized in order to help pay for Bo's popular social housing programs. The Wall Street Journal reported estimates that $11 billion was seized through the campaign. Li Jun, a fugitive businessman, told the Financial Times that Chongqing security forces seized his $700 million real estate business and tortured him as retaliation for attempting to purchase land that was also sought by the government. One microblogger was sentenced to a year in a labor camp for criticizing Bo's alleged abuse of the court system during the campaign.

The campaign to combat crime and maintain political stability also involved the launch of a major electronic surveillance operation in the city. Wang Lijun, Bo's police chief, served as the architect of the state-funded project, which was described in official media as a "comprehensive package bugging system covering telecommunications to the Internet." The system involved wiretaps, eavesdropping, and monitoring of internet communications. According to The New York Times, the eavesdropping operations did not only target local criminals, but also the communications of top Chinese leaders. In August 2011, a phone call between Hu Jintao and anti-corruption official Ma Wen was found to be wiretapped under Bo's orders. The revelation about the eavesdropping operation resulted in intense scrutiny from the Central Commission for Discipline Inspection, and contributed to Bo's downfall in 2012.

=== Social policies ===
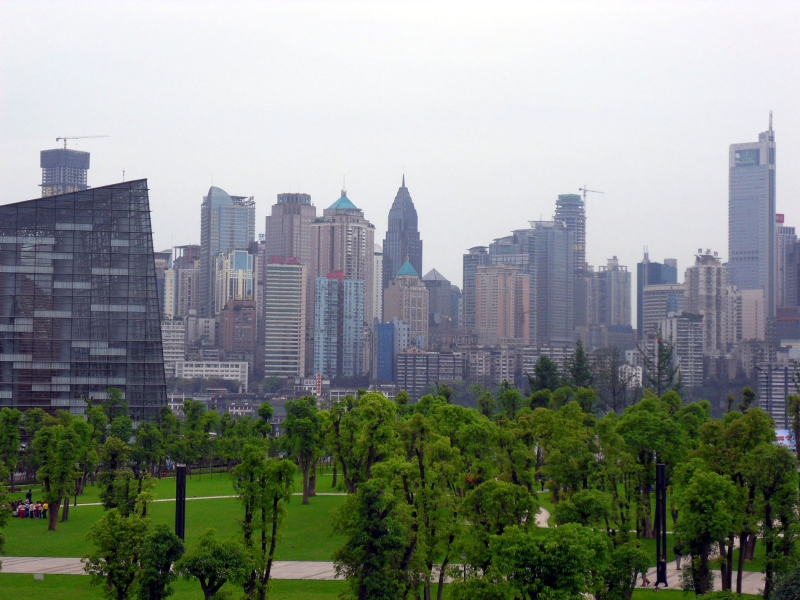
Under Bo Xilai's administration, millions of trees were imported and planted in Chongqing as part of a campaign to "green" the city.

A cornerstone of Bo's Chongqing model was a series of egalitarian social policies aimed at lessening the gap between rich and poor and easing the rural-urban divide. Bo promoted the notion of pursuing "red GDP"—an economic model embodying communist egalitarianism—and suggested that, if economic development were analogous to 'baking a cake', then the primary task should be to divide the cake fairly rather than building a larger cake.

To that end, the city reportedly spent $15.8 billion on public apartment complexes for use by recent college graduates, migrant workers, and low-income residents. Bo aimed to provide housing for 2.4 million residents by 2012. Residents whose incomes were under 3,000 yuan ($480) per month would be eligible to rent apartments for three years, with an option to buy thereafter. Huang Qifan, who served as mayor under Bo Xilai, indicated in 2010 that the subsidized housing project was "designed to free up more money for people to consume and drive the economy,” and noted that it would borrow elements from Singapore's Housing Development Board.

In 2007, the cities of Chongqing and Chengdu were selected to run pilot projects intended to mitigate the rural-urban divide and ease integration of rural residents into the cities. Under China's hukou registration system, citizens are classified as either rural or urban—a distinction that determines not only where they may live, but also affects educational opportunities, taxation, property rights, and so on. Of Chongqing's 32 million residents, only 27% held urban hukou certificates as of 2007. The 2007 project made it easier for rural residents to obtain urban status—a policy intended not only to help balance inequality, but also to enable the government to develop underused rural land. Under Bo's leadership, Chongqing established "land exchanges" where rural villages could earn credits for maximizing farmland. Bo pledged to move three million rural residents into urban areas.

Bo's populist approach to social policy was demonstrated during the November 2008 taxi strikes, which saw over 8,000 taxi drivers take to the streets for two days in protests over high fees, unregulated competition, and rising fuel charges. Similar protests in China are frequently suppressed—sometimes forcefully—with official media sometimes blaming labor unrest on criminal instigation. Bo's government instead held televised roundtable dialogues with the protesters and citizens, and agreed to allow the formation of a trade union. His handling of situation earned him praise as a comparatively progressive leader. A businessman who was reportedly involved in organizing the strike was later sentenced on 20 years in prison for disrupting transport and gangsterism.

The Chongqing model also involved a major campaign to "green" the city through a tree-planting initiative. The city reportedly imported millions of trees—many of them ginkgos—as part of the campaign. The cost of the greening initiative was estimated to be as high as 10 billion yuan.

=== Red culture movement ===
During his time in Chongqing, Bo initiated a series of Maoist-style campaigns to revive "red culture" and improve public morale. The initiative included the promotion of Maoist quotes, "singing red songs" (changhong), revolutionary television programming and operas, and initiatives to encourage students to work in the countryside, akin to the way students were required to do during the Down to the Countryside Movement of the Cultural Revolution.

Prior to the 60th Anniversary of the People's Republic of China celebrations, for instance, Bo sent out "red text messages" to the city's 13 million cellphone users. According to Xinhua News Agency, Bo's text messages are usually quotes from Mao's Little Red Book, and include phrases such as "I like how Chairman Mao puts it: The world is ours, we will all have to work together," and "responsibility and seriousness can conquer the world, and the Chinese Communist Party members represent these qualities." Bo and his team of municipal administrators also raised new Mao statues in Chongqing, while providing social housing to the city's less well-off. Some scholars have characterized this as an example of the revival of Maoism in the CCP ethos.

In 2011, Bo and the city's Media Department initiated a "Red Songs campaign" that demanded every district, government department, commercial enterprise, educational institution, and state radio and TV station begin "singing red songs" praising the achievements of the CCP. Bo pledged to reinvigorate the city with Marxist ideals reminiscent of the Mao era.

Reactions to the red culture movement were divided. Bo's revival of Mao-era culture and accompanying social welfare programs were popular within certain segments of society, and made Bo popular with both Marxists and neo-leftists. One student quoted in The Washington Post embraced the ethos of the campaign, saying, "When I sing red songs, I find a kind of spirit I never felt when singing modern songs… To surround yourself with material stuff is just a waste of time." A group of retired participants in a red song routine told the Los Angeles Times "We know these songs from our youth. We grew up with revolutionary spirit and we want to pass that on to our children.” Another noted that he felt compelled to participate in order to express appreciation to the CCP for the country's strong economy. As of the end of 2010, Chongqing had organized 155,000 events for singing red songs.

However, the campaign was unsettling to others—particularly the intelligentsia. A 57-year-old lawyer told The Washington Post, "I saw the beatings of the teachers by the Red Guards. It was horrible …Young people may not recognize it. But for us who lived through it, how can we possibly sing?" An academic quoted in The Daily Telegraph described the mandatory campaign as akin to being "drowned in a Red sea." In September 2009, a mid-level official in the city committed suicide after being pressured to organize his work unit to participate in the red songs campaign. The official, Xie Dajun, reportedly disagreed with the campaign, which evoked painful memories of the Cultural Revolution. Bo's critics and opponents derisively referred to him as "little Mao," with some expressing concern about the resemblance of the red culture campaign to the Cultural Revolution.

Chongqing residents sent 170 million messages of "red classics" via mobile phones and QQ.

=== Economic policies ===
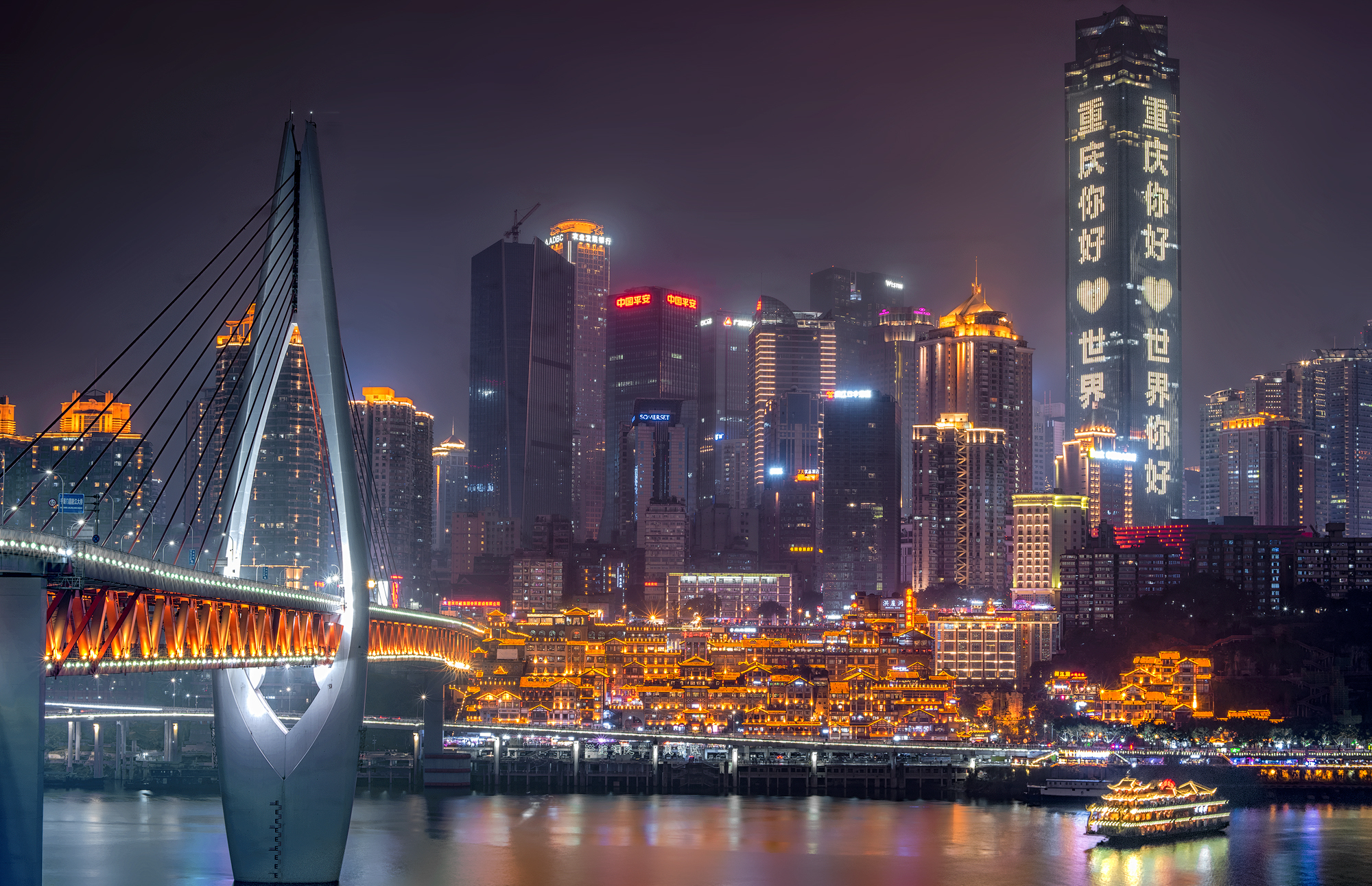
A view of the Chongqing skyline.

Another major component of Bo's Chongqing model concerned the city's economic policies. Just as he had done in Liaoning province, Bo ambitiously pursued foreign investment in the city, lowered corporate income tax rates (15% compared to the 25% national average), and sought to stimulate rapid urbanization and industrialization. He also carried on with policies initiated by his predecessors which focused on domestic consumption, rather than export-led growth. The Chongqing model also placed emphasis on the importance of state-owned enterprises; in 2010, Bo stressed that China "[needs] to have things that are state-owned." Bo also notably introduced a pilot tax on private homeownership; in contrast to a similar pilot in Shanghai, rates were substantially higher, and there was a great deal of showmanship invested in demonstrating that the richest people would have to pay it.

During his tenure, Chongqing reported annual GDP growth far exceeding the national average. In 2008, for instance, nationwide GDP growth was reported at 8%, while Chongqing reported 14.3%; the same year, foreign trade rose by 28%, and bank loans were up 29%. Several major corporations built or greatly expanded their manufacturing operations in Chongqing, including Hewlett-Packard, Foxconn, Ford motors, and BASF. Bo also touted "common prosperity" as part of his model, with mentions of the term being over 200 times in major newspapers in China from late 2010 to March 2012, 85% of them being from Chongqing Daily.

Bo's model of economic growth won national and international praise, but it also had its detractors. In particular, the so-called "red GDP" of subsidized infrastructure, housing and public works projects were criticized for running up the city's budget deficits. A former head of a Chongqing business association told The Daily Telegraph that under Bo, "lots of officials were not getting their salaries on time, getting an IOU instead. Eventually the economy was going to break." Chongqing received a disproportionately higher share of stimulus money from the central government in 2008, with $34 billion going to the city. Political rivals such as Bo's predecessor Wang Yang also suggested that economic figures such as those in Chongqing were "rigged"—artificially inflated through unnecessary construction and public works projects.

== Reassessments ==
Bo Xilai's political fortunes came to an abrupt end when his police chief, Vice Mayor Wang Lijun, fled to the American consulate in Chengdu hoping to gain political asylum. Wang reportedly provided the consulate with information on Bo's alleged misconduct, including his role obstructing investigations into the homicide of British citizen and Bo family associate Neil Heywood. In the fallout, Bo was removed as Chongqing party chief in March 2012 and suspended from the politburo in April 2012. Reportedly a rival of Xi Jinping for the paramount leadership, the scandal facilitated Xi's rise to power.

Following the removal of Bo Xilai from his official positions, Chinese leaders began an effort to discredit him. On 14 March, Premier Wen Jiabao reprimanded Bo during his annual press conference. Wen called the achievements of Chongqing "significant," but the result of "multiple administrations," rather than just Bo himself. Wen also made numerous allusions to the damage wrought by the Cultural Revolution—an indirect rebuke of Bo's efforts to revive "red culture". Vice Premier Zhang Dejiang was appointed as new Party secretary of Chongqing, where he has ended many policies implemented by his predecessor Bo Xilai that are seen by others as main part of the Chongqing model, such as remove the ban on the local TV channels to play commercial advertisements. Zhang even publicly denied the existence of the Chongqing Model during the 18th Party Congress in November 2012.

Apparently wary of the associations to the Cultural Revolution, a campaign was launched cracking down on expressions of "red culture" that Bo had championed. The crypto-Maoist campaign of singing red songs is also likely to be stopped. However, other aspects of the Chongqing model—in particular the egalitarian social policies, subsidized education and low-income housing projects—drew grassroots and popular support. At least in this regard, the successes of the Chongqing Model are likely to be remembered and studied, according to analyst Wu Zhong.

Critics asserted in the aftermath of Bo's removal that the "Striking Black" campaign against organized crime and corruption may have been policy a "political ploy designed to cast a negative light on his predecessor and political opponent, Wang Yang, and take advantage of popular resentment against corruption". Following Bo's removal, Chongqing's new vice mayor He Ting signaled that the city's security force would be overhauled. Some legal scholars and activists expressed hope that the forced labor sentences meted out under Bo might be reexamined. A collection of civil rights lawyers led by Liu Yang circulated an open letter online suggesting a review of criminal sentences under Bo's administration. Soon thereafter, Liu was reportedly instructed to desist in these efforts by the Beijing Bureau of Legal Affairs. The Washington Post reported that several relatives of individuals detained amidst the campaign began been seeking legal counsel from prominent civil rights lawyers—including Beijing-based Li Zhuang—in hopes of having the sentences overturned. The first person to petition for redress was Fang Hong, a dissident blogger who had been sent to one year in a labor camp for writing a poem mocking Bo. In May 2012, Fang filed to have his guilty verdict overturned, and sought compensation from the court. His appeal was successful, with a Chongqing court ruling in late June 2012 that there was an insufficient evidence to justify his detention.

Authorities also launched investigations into the city's spending policies, including the costly tree-planting campaign. Shortly after Bo's removal from his Chongqing party post, the city's finance bureau and economic planning office reportedly issued an urgent notice to government and party officials in the city to "clean up" investment projects. An official with the city's finance bureau indicated the investigation would focus on "how the money was raised, spent and managed." However, The Wall Street Journal reported that it was "unclear whether the scrutiny of Chongqing's spending stems from concern about potential wrongdoing or the city's debt burden, or whether it is primarily a politically motivated attempt to attack Mr. Bo's 'Chongqing model.'"

Yang Fan, a leading "new left" scholar at China University of Political Science and Law and co-author of the book The Chongqing Model, also signaled that a reassessment of the Chongqing model would be in order, saying "since a big scandal has hit Chongqing, it is imperative that we take a second look at the Chongqing Model".

Bo's downfall, and the subsequent reassessments of the Chongqing model, has been viewed by some commentators as a victory for Wang Yang's Guangdong model. In assessing the fall-out, John Wagner Givens wrote that "If there is a hope among China's leadership, it might be Mr. Bo's predecessor Wang Yang. While Mr. Wang may not have Bo's populist flair, he appears to have made some real, though small, political reforms."

Wu Jinglian, a Chinese liberal economist, and Sun Jian, a researcher at the CCP journal Qiushi, warned that vested interest blocs, such as the Gang of Princelings, should not block or unwind current reform.

Zhou Lian, an associate professor of philosophy at Renmin University of China, and Ai Weiwei, an artist in Beijing, have publicly criticized Bo and his Chongqing Model for being wrong and lowering trust. Li Zhuang, a lawyer who was imprisoned as part of the "Striking Black" policy, said that "the Chongqing model is problematic because the city's leaders do not follow the rule of law". According to Andrew J. Nathan, a political scientist at Columbia University, "the risk for China is that this scandal could taint everyone in power and challenge the legitimacy of the regime". Furthermore, he said, "All the worst things you ever imagined are actually true" and "It's not like nobody knew about this stuff, but now they know that it really is true and it's as bad as it can possibly be."

Zhang Musheng, an economist and journalist, is leading a new movement and is gaining followers for a plan to add checks and balances to the CCP and to significantly increase welfare benefits. Populists want to remake the party to reflect Chairman Mao's early vision. However, Mao-style populism is hated by most current older Chinese leaders, and Bo, its leading advocate, was destroyed by scandal. Because of this, few commentators expect China to willingly remake itself soon. And even those within the elite prepared to discuss major changes, including the second-generation "Gang of Princelings", have an interest in protecting the status quo.

Mary Gallagher, a sinologist and professor at the University of Michigan, evaluated the Chongqing Model as an attempt to find a "third way" between China's history of Maoist socialism and its current embrace of the global capitalist economy. She also wrote that Bo's Chongqing Model and common prosperity campaign "seems to be the unspoken inspiration" for the 2021 campaign launched under Xi. However, she also argued that unlike Bo, Xi focused less on redistribution and more on expanding of state control in his own common prosperity campaign.

== See also ==
- Economy of Chongqing
- Politics of Chongqing
- Guangdong model
