= Wang Yang (politician) =

Chinese politician (born 1955)

- 汪洋
- Wang in 2019

9th Chairman of the National Committee of the Chinese People's Political Consultative Conference
- In office 14 March 2018 – 10 March 2023
- Vice Chairpersons: See list: Zhang Qingli; Liu Qibao; Pagbalha Geleg Namgyai; Tung Chee-hwa; Wan Gang; Edmund Ho; Lu Zhangong; Wang Zhengwei; Ma Biao; Chen Xiaoguang; Leung Chun-ying; Xia Baolong; Yang Chuantang; Li Bin; Bagatur; Wang Yongqing; He Lifeng; Su Hui; Zheng Jianbang; Gu Shengzu; Liu Xincheng; He Wei; Gao Yunlong
- Secretary-General: Xia Baolong; Li Bin
- Preceded by: Yu Zhengsheng
- Succeeded by: Wang Huning

Vice Premier of China
- In office 16 March 2013 – 19 March 2018 Serving with Zhang Gaoli, Liu Yandong, Ma Kai
- Premier: Li Keqiang

Party Secretary of Guangdong
- In office 1 December 2007 – 18 December 2012
- Deputy: Huang Huahua; Zhu Xiaodan (Governor of Guangdong)
- Preceded by: Zhang Dejiang
- Succeeded by: Hu Chunhua

Party Secretary of Chongqing
- In office 24 December 2005 – 1 December 2007
- Deputy: Wang Hongju (mayor)
- Preceded by: Huang Zhendong
- Succeeded by: Bo Xilai

Personal details
- Born: 5 March 1955 (age 71) Suzhou, Anhui
- Party: Chinese Communist Party (1975-present)
- Children: Wang Xisha (daughter)
- Education: Central Party School, College of Continuing Education; University of Science and Technology of China
- Cabinet: Li Keqiang Government

Wang Yang
- "Wang Yang" in Chinese characters
- Chinese: 汪洋
Transcriptions
Standard Mandarin
- Hanyu Pinyin: Wāng Yáng
- IPA: [wáŋ jǎŋ]

Wang Yang (Chinese: 汪洋; pinyin: Wāng Yáng; born 5 March 1955) is a Chinese retired politician who served as the chairman of the National Committee of the Chinese People's Political Consultative Conference from 2018 to 2023. He was the fourth-ranking member of the Politburo Standing Committee of the Chinese Communist Party from 2017 to 2022.

Wang was born in Anhui, where he began his initial political career. He joined the central government in 1999, serving in various posts at the State Council until 2005. He was appointed as the Party Secretary of Chongqing in 2005, and later became the Party Secretary of Guangdong and a member of the Politburo in 2007. During his tenure in Guangdong, he pursued relatively liberal economic and social policies, dubbed the "Guangdong model" and contrasted with the more leftist model advocated by Bo Xilai, who succeeded Wang as the Chongqing Communist Party Secretary.

From 2013 to 2018, Wang served as vice premier in charge of agriculture, water management, commerce, tourism, and poverty reduction under Premier Li Keqiang. He was promoted to the Politburo Standing Committee in 2017, becoming its fourth-ranking member. He was appointed as the chairman of the Chinese People's Political Consultative Conference in 2018. Wang retired from the PSC in 2022, and was succeeded by Wang Huning as the CPPCC chair in 2023.

== Early life and career ==
Wang was born in Suzhou, Anhui on 12 March 1955, to an ordinary urban working-class family. His father was a manual labourer, and died when he was at a young age. Between 1972 and 1976, he worked as a food processing factory hand before being promoted to supervisor. He joined the Chinese Communist Party (CCP) in 1975. He subsequently joined the local Party School as an instructor, before going on to study political economy at the dawn of Deng Xiaoping's economic reforms at the Central Party School in 1979.

He returned to his hometown as a party policy instructor before joining the local Communist Youth League of China (CYLC) organization, serving as the deputy secretary of the CYLC Suxian County Committee from 1981 to 1982, director of the Publicity Department of the CYLC Anhui Provincial Committee from 1982 to 1983, and as the deputy secretary of the CYLC Anhui Provincial Committee from 1983 to 1984. He then moved on to work as the deputy director and Director of the Anhui Provincial Sports Bureau from 1984 until 1988.

His first tenure with civil administration was in Tongling, Anhui, beginning in 1988. He would serve on the municipal administration as its deputy party secretary, acting mayor, and mayor, while also concurrently earning a degree in political administration at the Central Party School between 1989 and 1992 via correspondence courses. During a visit in Anhui in 1992, Deng Xiaoping was reported to have "discovered" Wang, and was quoted as saying "Wang Yang is an exceptional talent."

Wang would rise to become the chairman of Anhui's Economic Planning Commission and the provincial Governor's assistant in 1992. Wang was appointed as the Executive Vice Governor of Anhui in 1993, serving in the position until 1999, concurrently serving as the CCP deputy secretary of Anhui from 1998 to 1999. He also received a master's in management science from the University of Science and Technology of China in Hefei via part-time studies between 1993 and 1995.

He was transferred to the central government in 1999, where he served as the deputy head of the State Development Planning Commission until 2003. He also twice pursued provincial and ministerial-level leaders' short-term study programs at the Central Party School in 1997 and 2001. He worked as a deputy secretary general of the State Council between 2003 and 2005, in charge of the day-to-day administrative work of the General Office of the State Council.

== Chongqing (2005–2007) ==
Wang served as the Party Committee Secretary in Chongqing, a western interior municipality, from 2005 to 2007. Wang's track record in Chongqing earned him national attention, for his work of bringing a geographically remote and relatively underdeveloped region onto the international scene. In Chongqing, Wang won praise for handling a sensitive urban demolition case. He was also the pioneer of media reforms in the municipality. Since 1 January 2007, Chongqing media no longer gave priority to the activities of the city's municipal leaders in daily news broadcasts, instead focusing on stories about ordinary people, which resulted in an increase of coverage about agriculture, rural life and rural migrant workers.

In 2007, Wang was succeeded as Chongqing party secretary by Bo Xilai. After taking Wang's place, Bo orchestrated a sweeping campaign against alleged local gangsters. Political observers noted that Bo's "crime"-fighting efforts were implicitly critical of Wang Yang, since Wang may now be criticized for tolerating the "mafia"-related corruption of the police and judiciary of Chongqing, and for tolerating organized crime in general. Bo Xilai was subsequently arrested for a variety of charges and sentenced to life imprisonment, and official evaluation of his "crime"-fighting campaign recognizes that it encompassed gross violations of civil rights, with almost 1,000 people sent to labor camps, and served to a large extent as a tool for Bo Xilai to consolidate power and take over economic resources.

== Guangdong (2007–2012) ==
As part of a party-wide reshuffle of regional leaders, Wang Yang was slated to become CCP Committee Secretary of Guangdong after the 17th Party National Congress. He took on the post formally in November 2007. As the post was considered one of the most important regional leadership offices in China, he also earned a seat on the Communist Party's Politburo, the country's second-highest ruling council. Wang's entry to the Politburo came as a surprise to some observers, given that prior to 2007, he had not even held full membership in the Central Committee, a larger body composed of around 200 members consisting mostly of provincial- and minister-level party officials.

In Guangdong, Wang increasingly branded himself as a bold reformer. He was instrumental in pushing Guangdong province, already dubbed China's "breeding ground of reform", towards even greater economic and political freedoms. Additionally, Wang sought to diversify the province's economy away from manufacturing, and make Shenzhen an innovation hub for China's new economy. Wang's unique leadership style set him apart from normally colourless and risk-averse provincial administrators who parrot the party line. He was often compared to Bo Xilai by political observers, as both Wang and Bo were seen as rising stars of Chinese politics vying for top office. Both held important regional offices that could be used as 'testing grounds' for policies that could eventually be implemented nationally.

During the 2008 financial crisis, Guangdong faced a mass wave of bankruptcies of small to medium-sized enterprises (SMEs). In response, Wang said that his administration would not intervene to prevent bankruptcies. He remarked that unprofitable SMEs are "not productive and will eventually be eliminated by the market." After a visit to the Pearl River Delta by Premier Wen Jiabao, who was in favour of protecting small and medium-sized enterprises in order to prevent unemployment, the Wang-led Guangdong government showed resistance adhering to central government directives which called for heavier state intervention.

In 2009, Wang wished to re-instate the May Day week-long holiday in Guangdong. The holiday was removed from the calendar by central authorities a few years earlier. However, the decision was subsequently reversed by the central government.

Wang won international praise for his handling of the Wukan protests in 2011. Wukan is a fishing village under the jurisdiction of the city of Shanwei; thousands of villagers rose in protest against what they saw as insufficient compensation for local residents during the sale of land by officials. Under Wang's leadership the provincial government offered concessions to protesting villagers and allowed local elections for a new village chief.

During his term in Guangdong, Wang also became an outspoken critic of corruption and nepotism, reputedly putting him at odds with the family of the late general Ye Jianying. Ye's family had extensive economic and political interests in Guangdong and retained massive influence among the country's political elites, particularly the descendants of early Communist revolutionaries, better known as "Princelings". As a result, Wang's detractors considered him "politically unreliable", suggesting that Wang showed too much boldness in upstaging the status quo, under which most Princelings had benefited immensely. Wang was widely touted in the lead up the 18th Party National Congress as a rising star, likely slated for Politburo Standing Committee (PSC) membership in 2012. However, it was said that Wang's poor relations with the Ye family reduced his chances of entering the PSC. Ultimately, the 18th PSC was dominated by people described as Princelings, where three of the seven members (Xi Jinping, Yu Zhengsheng, and Wang Qishan) belong to the princelings.

== Top leadership ==
=== Vice Premier (2013–2018) ===
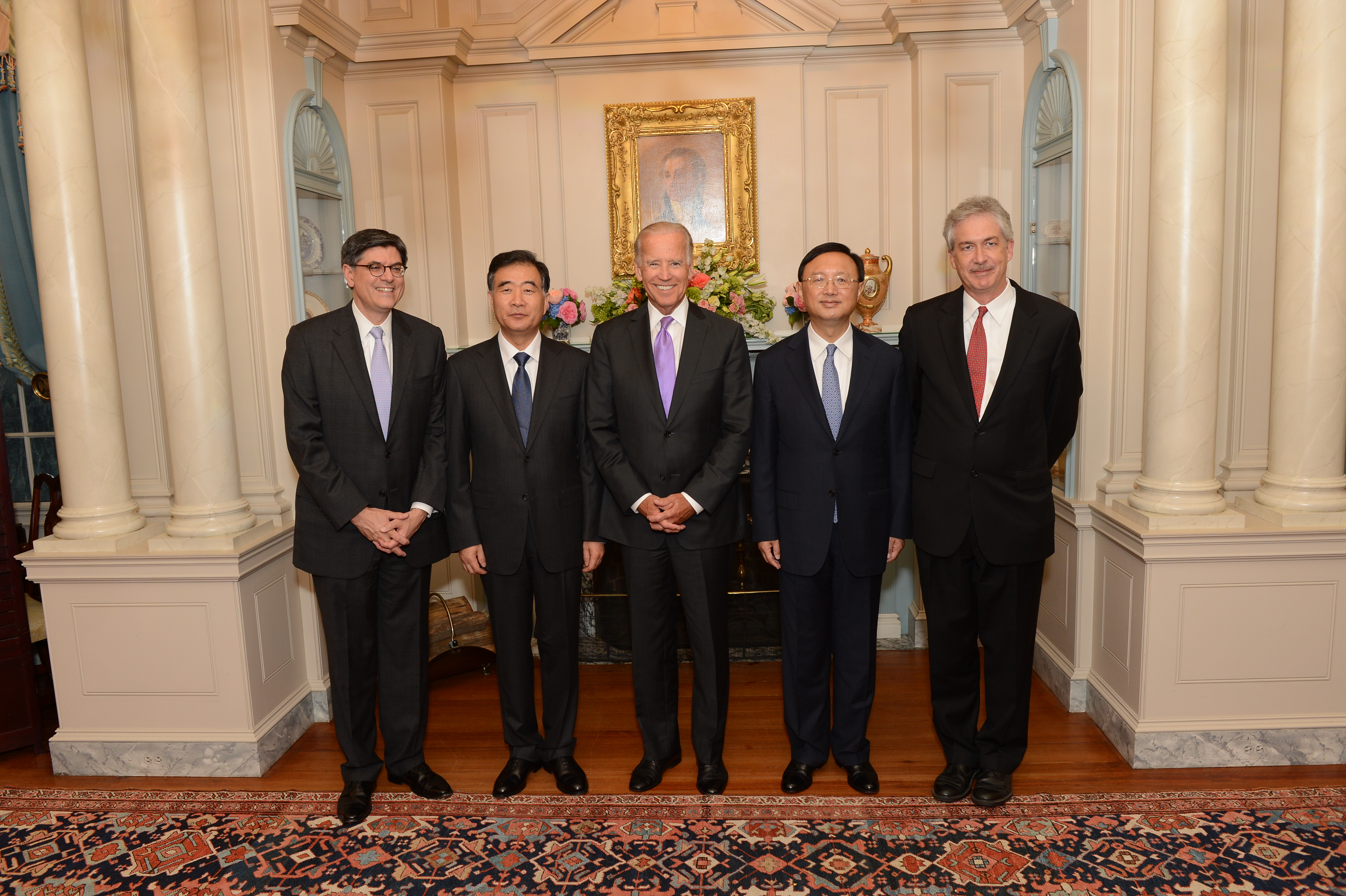
Wang with US Vice President Joe Biden in Washington, D.C., 10 July 2013

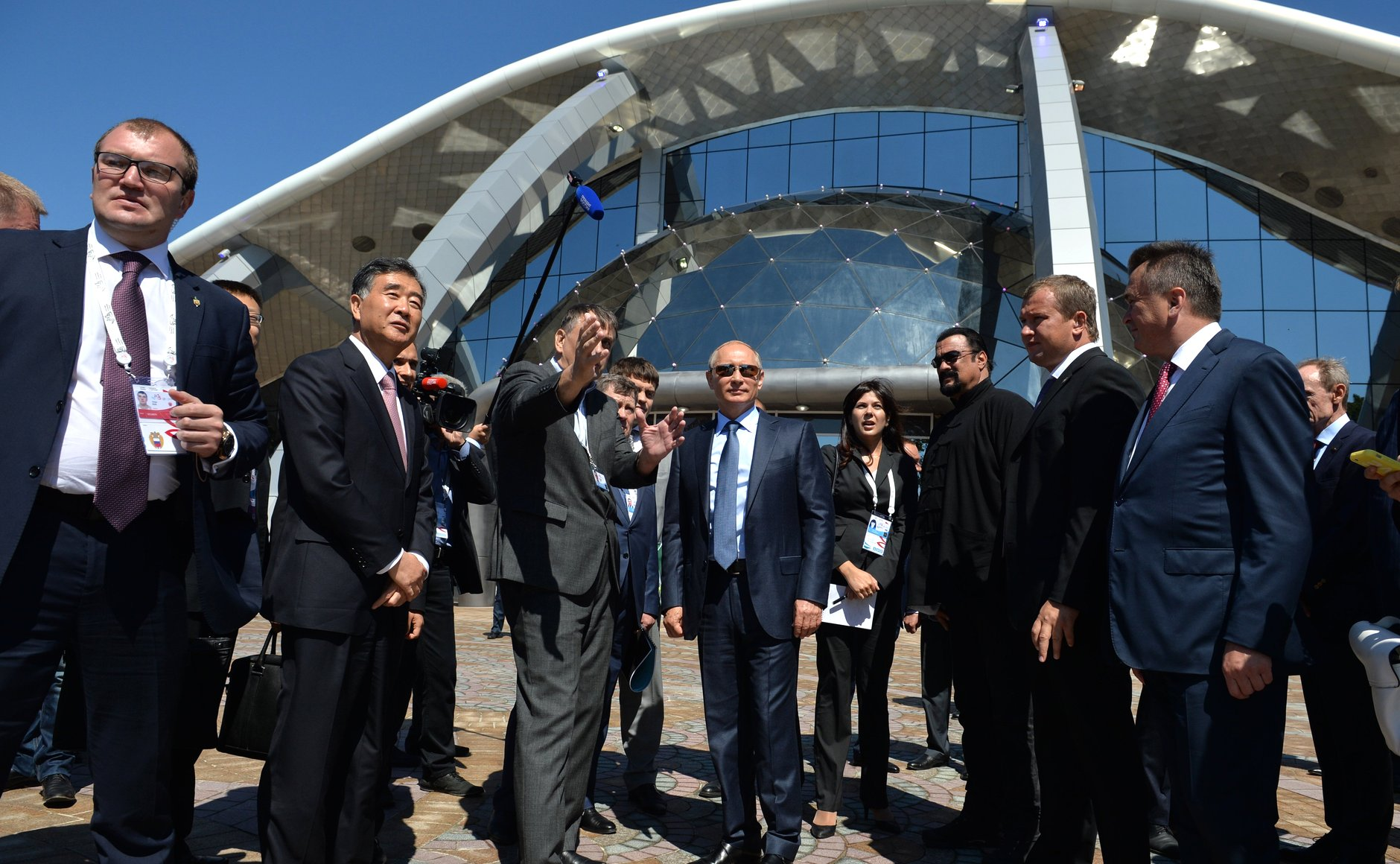
Wang with Russian President Vladimir Putin in Vladivostok, Russia, 4 September 2015

While Wang did not make it to the pinnacle of Chinese political life as was predicted early on by some observers, he was reappointed as a member of the Politburo membership at the 1st Plenary Session of the 18th Central Committee on 15 November 2012. He subsequently left his leadership post in Guangdong, succeeded by another rising political star, Hu Chunhua. In March 2013, Wang Yang was appointed as the Vice Premier in Li Keqiang's government at the first session of the 12th National People's Congress, overseeing portfolios of agriculture, water management, commerce, tourism, and poverty reduction.

In his capacity as Vice Premier, Wang frequently met with international dignitaries and accompanied Xi Jinping or Li Keqiang on trips abroad. However, his periodic displays of bold political views seem to have receded to the background as the new group of party leaders gradually coalesced around Xi Jinping's ideology. Following the 4th Plenum of the 18th Central Committee held in October 2014, Wang published an article on the party mouthpiece People's Daily in which he praised the legal reforms discussed at the plenum and said that China will learn from its own culture and experience and will never "copy models or philosophies of other countries" when it comes to legal reform.

Wang has taken on several important roles in heading ad hoc policy coordination steering committees known as Central Leading Groups. He has, since 2013, been the leader of the Leading Group on Intellectual Property and Counterfeit Goods, the leader of the State Council Leading Group on Poverty Reduction, and the deputy leader of the Commission on Food Safety. He was also named in 2014 as the deputy leader of the Leading Group for Advancing the Development of One Belt One Road, and the leader of the Leading Group on Poverty Reduction. Wang was considered a strong candidate for entry into the Politburo Standing Committee at the 19th Party National Congress in 2017.

=== Chairman of the Chinese People's Political Consultative Conference (2018–2023) ===
Wang was chosen to be a member of the 19th Politburo Standing Committee, China's top decision-making body, at the 1st Plenary Session of the 19th Central Committee on 25 October 2017. In March 2018, Wang became Chairman of the National Committee of the Chinese People's Political Consultative Conference at the 1st Session of the 13th CPPCC National Committee.

Wang was the head of the Central Xinjiang Work Coordination Group, a body deciding Xinjiang policies. Wang visited Xinjiang in April 2018, and in March and July 2019. According to a source quoted by the South China Morning Post, Wang reported to Xi Jinping that measures targeting Muslim ethnic minorities in Xinjiang have triggered widespread discontent among Han Chinese officials and citizens.

During the 20th National Congress of the Chinese Communist Party in October 2022, Wang was not elected to the new 20th Central Committee of the Chinese Communist Party which indicated his political retirement. Wang stepped down as Chairman of the Chinese People's Political Consultative Conference in March 2023.

== Political positions and public image ==
Wang is often seen as a leading liberal and reformist in China's ruling elite, representing a school of thought that advocates for a greater role of the market, gradual political liberalization, and a government that is more in touch with the needs of ordinary people. Although he has been generally more daring in challenging party orthodoxy compared to his peers, analysts suggest that he is unlikely to directly challenge the party line. Under the leadership of Xi Jinping, Wang has been seen as moving closer to party orthodoxy, expressing support for Xi as well as tough stances on Taiwan, Xinjiang and Tibet.

Wang is also seen as an advocate for market-based solutions to economic development. If economic growth were analogous to baking a cake, Wang said that the priority should be to "bake a cake" rather than to divide it, i.e., economic growth takes precedence over wealth re-distribution. This was in stark contrast to the "Chongqing model" advanced by Bo Xilai, which suggests that wealth should be re-distributed fairly first, or that wealth redistribution and economic growth can take place simultaneously. Wang and Bo's opposing views on what was dubbed the "Cake Theory" have been characterized as an increasingly apparent "left-right" ideological divide within China's ruling elite.

Wang is often seen smiling in public and has been known to shun hair dye, unlike most of his colleagues. Wang is also known to make offhand and often humorous remarks in public. As the top economic official representing China at the 2013 U.S.–China Strategic and Economic Dialogue, Wang compared the relationship between China and the United States as that of a married couple. In a session with U.S. Treasury Secretary Jack Lew, Wang remarked "I am aware that the US allows gay marriage, but I don't think Jacob and I have such intentions." He later added that China and the United States should not "choose the path of a divorce", stating, "like that of Wendy Deng and Rupert Murdoch, it is just too expensive".

== Personal life ==
Wang Yang is married to Zhu Mali, whose father Zhu Jianyuan was the deputy head of the Suxian Prefecture. They have one daughter, Wang Xisha, who graduated from Peking University’s Guanghua School of Management and received a master's degree from Tufts University.

In 2019, Wang Xisha was reported by The New York Times to have been hired in 2010 by Deutsche Bank partly because of her father's connections. In particular, it was mentioned by an employee at the bank during her application process that Wang Xisha would "have access" to a state-owned automaker in Guangzhou, where Wang Yang was a top government official. In 2020, Wang Xisha was mentioned again by the New York Times, where it was reported that she bought a US$2 million home in Hong Kong in 2010. She is married to Nicholas Zhang (Zhang Xinliang), the grandson of the former defense minister Zhang Aiping.

== Awards and honors ==
- Order of Friendship (Russia, 2017)

== Notes ==
Political offices
Preceded by Yu Zhengsheng	Chairman of the National Committee of the Chinese People's Political Consultative Conference; 2018–2023	Succeeded by Wang Huning
Party political offices
Preceded by Huang Zhendong	Party Secretary of Chongqing; 2005–2007	Succeeded by Bo Xilai
Preceded by Zhang Dejiang	Party Secretary of Guangdong; 2007–2012	Succeeded by Hu Chunhua
Government offices
Preceded by Shao Ming	Executive Vice-Governor of Anhui; 1993–1999	Succeeded by Zhang Ping
Preceded by Zhang Runxia	Mayor of Tongling; 1988–1992	Succeeded by Wang Shengbang
