= Growing the pie =

Expression in economics

"Growing the pie" is an expression used in macroeconomics to refer to the assertion that growing the economy of a nation as a whole creates more availability of wealth and work opportunities than does redistribution of wealth.

== Summary ==
Growing the pie could be called "more for everyone." This is as opposed to centrally controlled economic theory, where some give up some of their slice of the pie, that others might have more. Growing the Pie refers to a theory that free market economics grow the size of every slice, and thus raises the standard of living for all participants. This theory proposes that growing the pie is better than redistribution of pie through a centrally controlled economy.

Growing the pie is related to the concept of economic liberalism. Economic liberalism was first fully formulated by Adam Smith, who advocated minimal interference of government in a market economy, as opposed to Keynesian and centrally planned economic views which support taxing and deficit spending to control consumption.

== Meaning ==
The phrase itself refers to a pie that is divided into various sizes. In a free economy, certain players have larger ‘slices’ of pie than others since there is a clear and concise inequality of wealth. To increase the share of the poor, those with smaller slices, the first instinct would be to redistribute the slices to be more evenly cut. However, the criticism of this is that the nation as a whole does not become wealthier and leaves some worse off than before. They explain, then, that the optimal solution is to expand the size of the pie so that the share proportions remain the same but result in larger overall wealth.

With this there is no redistribution of wealth, but all in the economy are left with larger ‘slices’ of wealth. Advocates of this phrase and theory criticize redistribution of wealth since there is no new wealth created. This phrase supports a more liberal economic view in which savings and investments are encouraged rather than consumption and government spending to increase long term growth.

== Criticism ==
This phrase receives criticism from like-minded classical liberal advocates who stress that it suggests there is an inherent level of wealth present in a society in which individuals are entitled. When in fact, these critics state, wealth in a modern society is created and owned by individuals, not societies, and therefore the imagery of the pie fails to capture this.

== See also ==
- A rising tide lifts all boats
- Trickle-down economics
