= Mary E. Gallagher =

American political scientist

- Born: Mary Elizabeth Gallagher; June 26, 1969 (age 56)
- Other names: 高敏
- Citizenship: American
- Education: Smith College (BA), Princeton University (PhD)
- Occupation: Political scientist
- Employer: University of Notre Dame
- Organization: Brookings Institution
- Board member of: National Committee on U.S.-China Relations

Mary Elizabeth Gallagher (born June 26, 1969) is an American political scientist. She is currently the Marilyn Keough Dean of the University of Notre Dame's Keough School of Global Affairs and a nonresident senior fellow at the Brookings Institution's John L. Thornton China Center.

== Education ==
Gallagher holds a BA in government and East Asian studies (1991) from Smith College and a PhD in politics (2001) from Princeton University.

== Academic career ==
Prior to joining Notre Dame, Gallagher was the Amy and Alan Lowenstein Chair in democracy, democratization and human rights at the University of Michigan. She directed UMich's International Institute from 2020 to 2024.

Gallagher serves on the National Committee on U.S.-China Relations' board of directors.

== Publications ==
=== Books ===
- Authoritarian Legality in China: Law, Workers and the State, Cambridge University Press, September 7, 2017
- Contagious Capitalism: Globalization and the Politics of Labor in China, Princeton University Press, 2005

=== Articles ===
- Does a Stronger Xi Mean a Weaker Chinese Communist Party? The New York Times, March 2, 2018
