= Chinese People's Political Consultative Conference =

Political advisory body in the People's Republic of China

Chinese People's Political Consultative Conference 中国人民政治协商会议
- Emblem of the Chinese People's Political Consultative Conference

Type
- Type: United front organ Constitutional convention (Historical); Legislature (Historical)

History
- Founded: 21 September 1949; 77 years ago
- Preceded by: National Assembly

Leadership
- Chairman: Wang Huning, CCP
- Vice Chairpersons: See list: Shi Taifeng, CCP; Hu Chunhua, CCP; Shen Yueyue, CCP; Wang Yong, CCP; Zhou Qiang, CCP; Pagbalha Geleg Namgyai, Nonpartisan; Edmund Ho, Nonpartisan; Leung Chun-ying, Nonpartisan; Bagatur, CCP; Su Hui, TDSL; Shao Hong, JS; Gao Yunlong, CDNCA; Mu Hong, CCP; Xian Hui, CCP; Wang Dongfeng, CCP; Jiang Xinzhi, CCP; Jiang Zuojun, CZGP; He Baoxiang, RCCK; Wang Guangqian, CDL; Qin Boyong, CDNCA; Zhu Yongxin, CAPD; Yang Zhen, CPWDP
- Secretary-General: Wang Dongfeng, CCP
- Main Organ: National Committee of the Chinese People's Political Consultative Conference (NC-CPPCC); Standing Committee of the National Committee of the Chinese People's Political Consultative Conference (NC-CPPCC Standing Committee)

Structure
- Seats: NC-CPPCC: 2169; NC-CPPCC Standing Committee: 324
- NC-CPPCC political groups: CCP, democratic parties, and independents (544); People's organizations (313); Representatives of various groups (1076); Specially invited people (236)
- NC-CPPCC Standing Committee political groups: CCP, democratic parties, and independents (193); People's organizations (30); Representatives of various groups (67); Specially invited people (33); Vacant (1)
- Length of term: 5 years

Meeting place
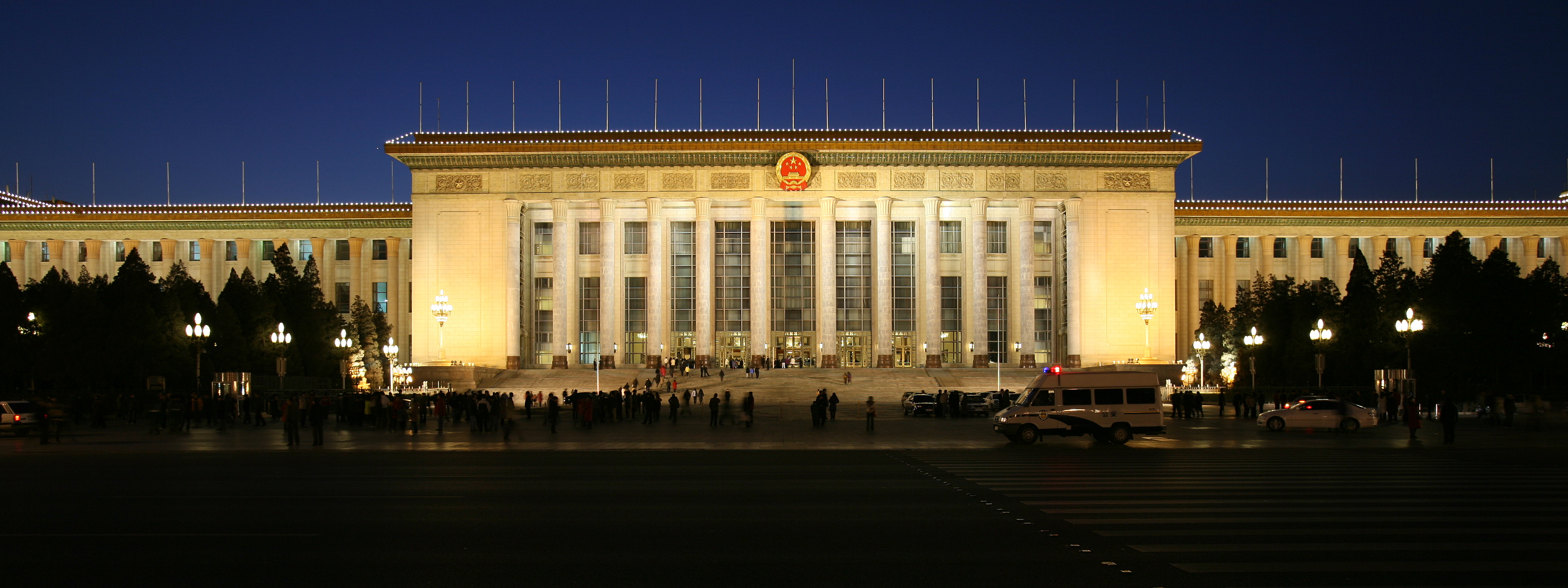
- Great Hall of the People, Xicheng District, Beijing City, People's Republic of China
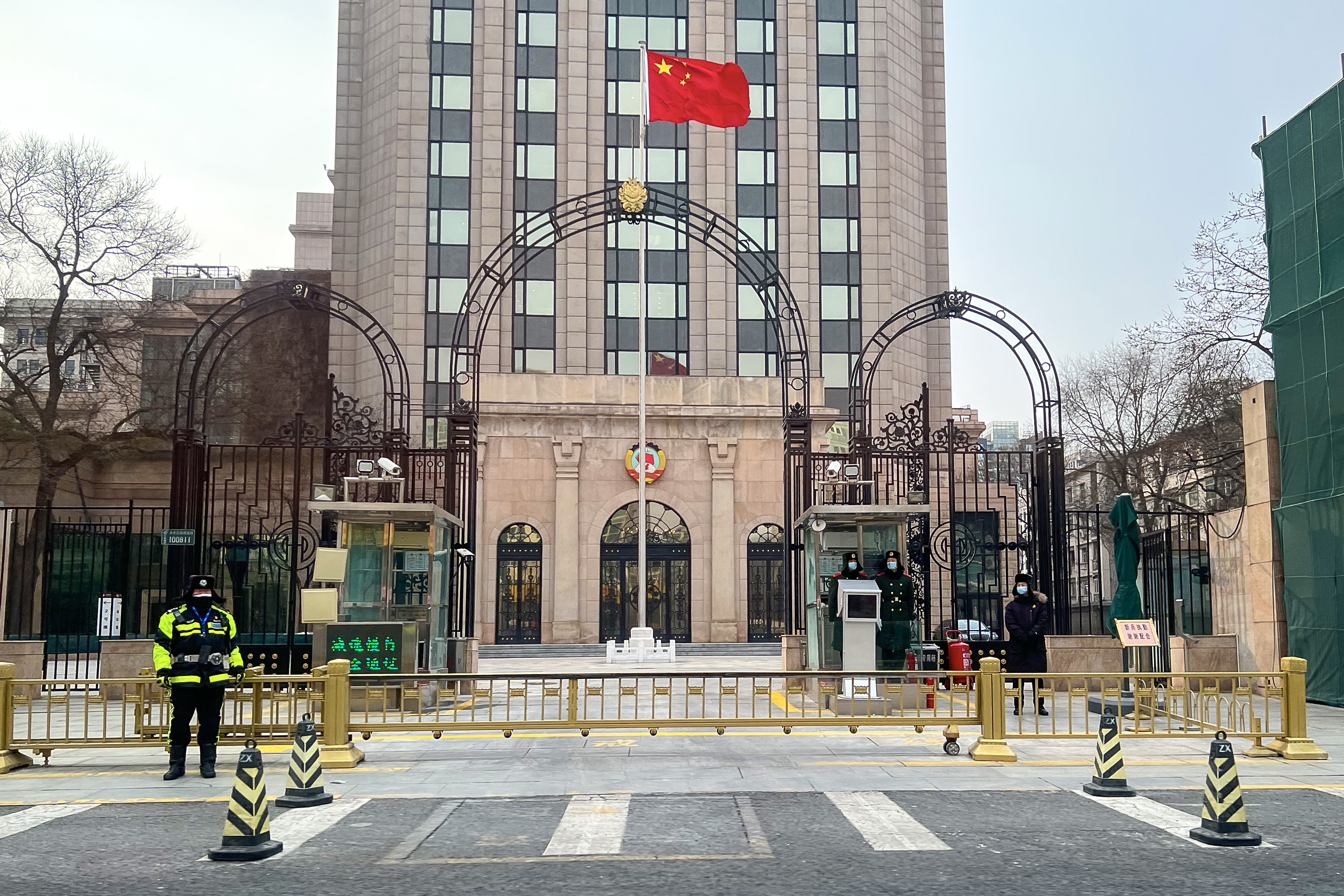
- Office Building, Xicheng District, Beijing City, People's Republic of China

Website
- en.cppcc.gov.cn

Chinese People's Political Consultative Conference
- Simplified Chinese: 中国人民政治协商会议
- Traditional Chinese: 中國人民政治協商會議
Transcriptions
Standard Mandarin
- Hanyu Pinyin: Zhōngguó Rénmín Zhèngzhì Xiéshāng Huìyì

Short form
- Simplified Chinese: 人民政协
- Traditional Chinese: 人民政協
- Literal meaning: People's Political Consultation
Transcriptions
Standard Mandarin
- Hanyu Pinyin: Rénmín Zhèngxié

Shortest form
- Simplified Chinese: 政协
- Traditional Chinese: 政協
- Literal meaning: Political Consultation
Transcriptions
Standard Mandarin
- Hanyu Pinyin: Zhèngxié

Third alternative Chinese name
- Simplified Chinese: 新政协
- Traditional Chinese: 新政協
- Literal meaning: New Political Consultation
Transcriptions
Standard Mandarin
- Hanyu Pinyin: Xīnzhèngxié

The Chinese People's Political Consultative Conference (CPPCC) is a political advisory assembly in the People's Republic of China and a central part of the Chinese Communist Party (CCP)'s united front system. Its members advise and submit proposals for political and social issues to government bodies. However, the CPPCC is a body without legislative power. While consultation does take place, it is supervised and directed by the CCP.

The Political Consultative Conference was established in 1945 as part of peace negotiations between the Kuomintang and the CCP. The conference ultimately ended in failure, leading the CCP to withdraw. In 1948, after major successes in the Chinese Civil War, the CCP started to gather a new conference to discuss a new state and new government to replace the Republic of China. In 1949, the first plenary session of the CPPCC gathered, and adopted the Common Program, and laid the groundwork for the foundation of the People's Republic of China. The CPPCC initially acted as the de facto legislature of the PRC, until its legislative powers were transferred to the National People's Congress with the adoption of the 1954 Constitution.

The organizational hierarchy of the CPPCC consists of a National Committee and regional committees. Regional committees extend to the provincial, prefecture, and county level. According to the charter of the CPPCC, the relationship between the National Committee and the regional committees is one of guidance and not direct leadership. However, an indirect leadership exists via the CCP Central Committee's United Front Work Department at each level. The National Committee of the Chinese People's Political Consultative Conference typically holds a yearly meeting at the same time as plenary sessions of the NPC. The CPPCC National Committee and NPC plenary sessions are collectively called the Two Sessions.

The body traditionally consists of delegates from the CCP and its people's organizations, eight non-oppositional democratic parties subservient to the CCP, as well as nominally independent members. The CPPCC National Committee is chaired by a member of the Politburo Standing Committee of the CCP, who is assisted by several vice chairs and a secretary-general. The CPPCC is intended to be more representative of a broader range of people than is typical of government office in the People's Republic of China, including a broad range of people from both inside and outside the CCP. The composition of the members of the CPPCC changes over time according to national strategic priorities.

== History ==
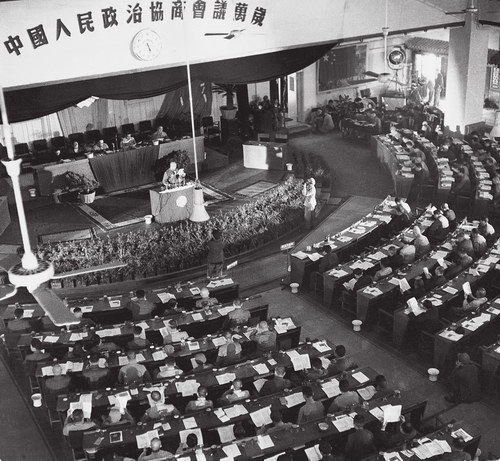
First plenary session of the Chinese People's Political Consultative Conference in 1949

The origins of the conference date prior to the existence of the People's Republic of China. During negotiations between the Chinese Communist Party and the Kuomintang in 1945, the two parties agreed to open multiparty talks on post-World War II political reforms via a Political Consultative Conference. This was included in the Double Tenth Agreement. This agreement was implemented by the National Government of the Republic of China, who organized the first Political Consultative Conference from 10 to 31 January 1946. Representatives of the Kuomintang, CCP, Young China Party, and China Democratic League, as well as independent delegates, attended the conference in Chongqing.

After major successes in the civil war, the CCP, on 1 May 1948, invited the other political parties, popular organizations and community leaders to form a new Political Consultative Conference to discuss a new state and new coalition government.

In 1949, with the CCP having gained control of most of mainland China, it organized a "new" Political Consultative Conference in September, inviting delegates from various friendly parties to attend and discuss the establishment of a new state. This conference was then renamed the People's Political Consultative Conference. On 29 September 1949, the first plenary session of the Chinese People's Political Consultative Conference unanimously adopted the Common Program as the basic political program for the country. The conference approved the new national anthem, flag, capital city, and state name, and elected the first government of the People's Republic of China.

From 1949 to 1954, the conference became the de facto legislature of the PRC. During this period, it issued nearly 3,500 laws, laying the foundations of the newly established PRC. In 1954, the Constitution transferred legislative functions to the National People's Congress.

During the Hundred Flowers Campaign between 1956 and 1957, Mao Zedong encouraged members of the CPPCC to speak about the shortcomings of the CCP. However, those who did faced severe repercussions such as heavy criticism and or incarceration in labor camps in the subsequent Anti-Rightist Campaign.

Along with most other institutions, the CPPCC was effectively decimated during the Cultural Revolution. It was revived during the First Session of its 5th National Committee between 24 February to 8 March 1974, during which Deng Xiaoping was elected as its chairman. New rules for the CPPCC were issued in 1983, which limited the proportion of CCP members to 40 percent.

Since the beginning of reform and opening up, the CPPCC increasingly focused on accommodating Hong Kong and Macau elites and attracting investment from overseas Chinese communities. A new "Economy Sector" was created inside the CPPCC in 1993, and the 1990s saw an increase in the number of business-oriented CPPCC members, many of whom saw the CPPCC as a way to network and communicate with officials in the party-state apparatus.

When plans for the Sanxia (Three Gorges) Dam were revived by the CCP during the emphasis on the Four Modernizations during the early period of Reform and Opening Up, the CPPCC became a center of opposition to the project. It convened panels of experts who recommended delaying the project.

Previously dominated by senior figures in real-estate, state-owned enterprises, and "princelings", the CPPCC in 2018 was primarily composed of individuals from China's technology sector.

== Present role ==
"The Chinese People's Political Consultative Conference, a broadly based representative organization of the united front which has played a significant historical role, will play a still more important role in the country's political and social life, in promoting friendship with other countries and in the struggle for socialist modernization and for the reunification and unity of the country. The system of the multi-party cooperation and political consultation led by the Communist Party of China will exist and develop for a long time to come."

— Preamble of the Constitution of the People's Republic of China

The CPPCC is the highest-ranking body in the united front system. It is the "peak united front forum, bringing together CCP officials and Chinese elites." According to state media Xinhua News Agency, the CPPCC is described as an "organization in the patriotic united front of the Chinese people" as well as "an important organ" of the "system of multi-party cooperation and political consultation under the leadership of the CCP." It is further explained that the CPPCC is neither a body of state power nor a policy-making organ, but rather a platform for "various political parties, people's organizations, and people of all ethnic groups and from all sectors of society" to participate in state affairs. According to Sinologist Peter Mattis, the CPPCC is "the one place where all the relevant actors inside and outside the party come together: party elders, intelligence officers, diplomats, propagandists, soldiers and political commissars, united front workers, academics, and businesspeople." In practice, the CPPCC serves as "the place where messages are developed and distributed among party members and the non-party faithful who shape perceptions of the CCP and China."

CPPCC's members advise and put proposals for political and social issues to government bodies. However, the CPPCC is a body without real legislative power. While consultation does take place, it is supervised and directed by the CCP.

Xinhua News Agency says that the main functions of the CPPCC are "political consultation, exercise democratic supervision and participate in the discussion and the handling of state affairs". It describes political consultation as "major principles and policies proposed by the central and local governments and matters of importance concerning political, economic, cultural and social affairs", democratic supervision as "offering suggestion and criticism, as well as supervision over the implementation of the Constitution, other laws, regulations and major policies, and over the work of government agencies and their functionaries" and participation in state affairs as "organizing CPPCC members of various parties, people's organizations, people of various ethnic minorities and other social groups to take part in the country's political, economic, cultural and social activities".

As a united front organ, the CPPCC collaborates with the CCP's United Front Work Department. According to Mattis, the CPPCC gathers the society's elite, while the UFWD "implements policy and handles the nuts and bolts of united front work." The UFWD oversees the people's organizations' deputies, who constitute the membership of the CPPCC, and manages any nomination work for potential deputies to be elected to the Conference from these organizations.

=== Deputies ===
The CPPCC includes deputies elected from the CCP and its people's organizations, the eight non-oppositional democratic parties subservient to the CCP, as well as nominally independent deputies The composition of the members of the CPPCC changes over time according to national strategic priorities. The party's Organization Department is responsible for the nomination of prospective deputies who are CCP members.In keeping with the united front strategy, prominent non-CCP members have been included among the Vice Chairs.

The CPPCC provides a deputy "seat" for the 8 non-communist parties and so-called "patriotic democrats". The CPPCC also reserves seats for overseas delegates, as well as regional deputies from Hong Kong, Macau and Taiwan. Non-communist party members of the CPPCC are nominated by the party's United Front Work Department for appointment or election to the Conference.The conception of the non-communist parties as part of a coalition rather than an opposition is expressed in the PRC's constitutional principle of "political consultation and multiparty cooperation." In principle, the CCP is obliged to consult the others on all major policy issues. In the early 2000s, CPPCC deputies frequently petitioned the CCP Central Committee regarding socioeconomic, health, and environmental issues.

== National Committee ==
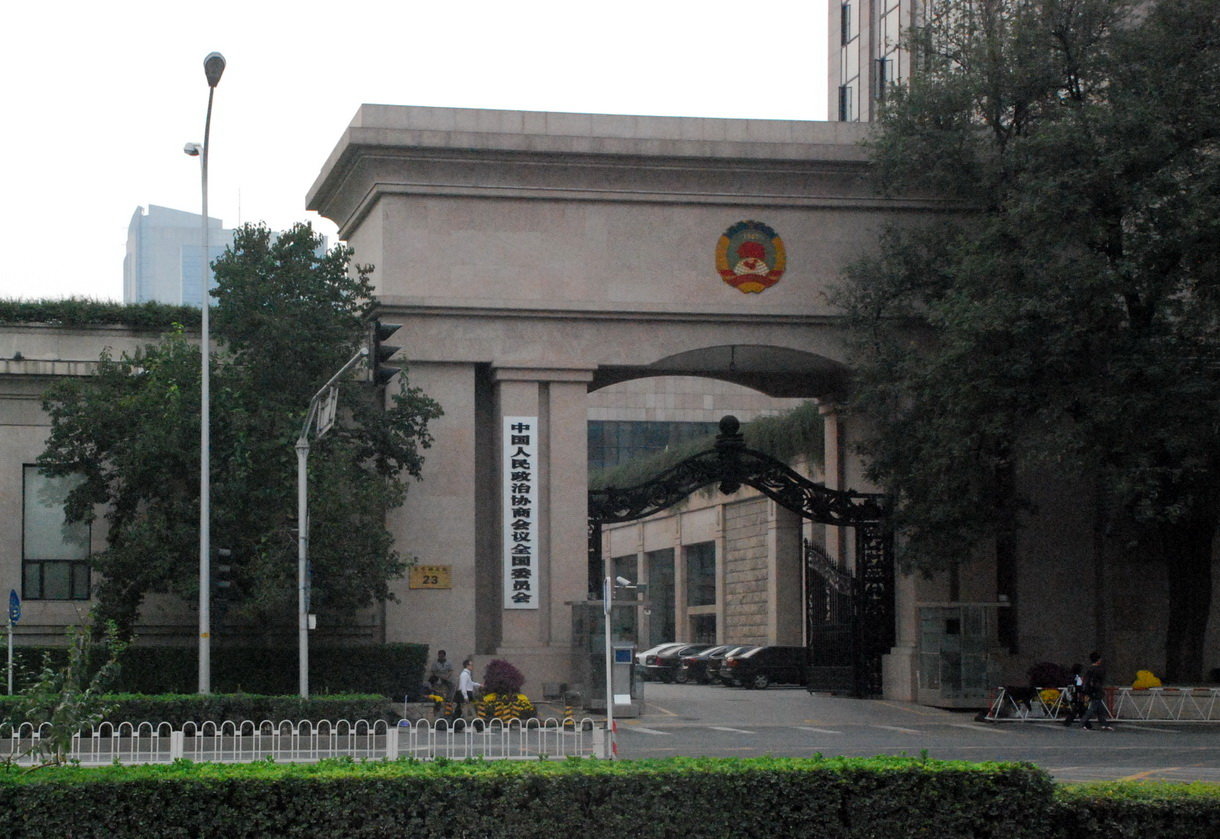
Office Building of the CPPCC National Committee in Beijing

The National Committee of CPPCC is the national-level organization that represents the CPPCC nationally and is composed of deputies from various sectors of society. Deputies of the National Committee are elected for five-year terms, though this can be extended in exceptional circumstances by a two-thirds majority vote of all deputies of the Standing Committee.

The National Committee holds plenary sessions annually, though a session can be called by the National Committee's Standing Committee if necessary. The plenary sessions are generally held in March, around the same date as the annual session of the National People's Congress; together, these meetings are termed as the Two Sessions. During the Two Sessions, the CPPCC and the NPC hear and discuss reports from the premier, the prosecutor general, and the chief justice. Every CPPCC plenary session makes amendments to the CPPCC charter, elects on every first plenary session the Standing Committee, which handles the regular affairs of the body, and adopts resolutions on the National Committee's "major working principles and tasks". The Standing Committee is responsible for selecting deputies to the Conference, implementing the CPPCC's resolutions, and interpreting its official charter.

The National Committee is led by a chairman, currently Wang Huning, one of the highest-ranking offices in the country; since its establishment, all CPPCC chairpersons have been a member of the Politburo Standing Committee of the CCP except during transition periods, being at least its 4th-ranking member. The chairman is assisted by several vice chairpersons and a secretary-general, who heads the National Committee's General Office; together, they make up the Chairperson's Council, which handles the day-to-day affairs of the Standing Committee and convences its sessions on an average of at least one committee session per month, unlike the SC-NPC which holds its sessions bimonthy. Council meetings coordinate work reports sent to the Standing Committee and the wider National Committee, review united front work, identify the issues to focus on during SC-NCCPPCC sessions and the annual general plenary, and highlight important ideological directions of the CCP. It also presides over the preparatory meeting of the first plenary session of the next National Committee.

== Regional committees ==
In addition to the main National Committee, the CPPCC contains numerous regional committees at the provincial, prefecture, and county level. According to an old post in CPPCC's website, there were 3,164 local CPPCC committees at every level by the end of 2006, containing around 615,164 deputies elected in like manner as the National Committee. Like the National Committee, the regional committees serve for five year terms, have a chairperson, vice chairpersons and a secretary-general, convene plenary sessions at least once a year, and have a standing committee with similar functions. According to the CPPCC charter, the relationship between the National Committee and the local committees, as well as the relationship between the local committee and lower-level committees is "one of guidance". However, an indirect leadership exists via the United Front Work Department at each level.

The following regional committees are modeled after the National Committee with identical composition of deputies elected to them and are each supervised by regional level Standing Committees:

- CPPCC province-level committees
  - including regional committees of the autonomous regions and city committees of directly controlled municipal governments (Beijing, Tianjin, Chongqing and Shanghai)
- CPPCC prefecture-level committees
  - including autonomous prefectural committees and city committees of sub-provincial and prefectural cities
- CPPCC county-level committees
  - including committees of autonomous counties and country-level cities

== See also ==
- Chinese Literature and History Press, the CPPCC's publishing house
- List of current members of CPPCC by sector
