= Biweekly consultation meeting =

Chinese political advisory gathering

A biweekly consultation meeting (Chinese: 双周协商座谈会; pinyin: Shuāngzhōu xiéshāng zuòtánhuì) is a periodic gathering of the National Committee of the Chinese People's Political Consultative Conference (CPPCC).

== History ==
After the founding of the People's Republic of China, in March 1950, democratic parties and independents jointly initiated a biweekly symposium to discuss current political affairs, with representatives from the Chinese Communist Party (CCP), democratic parties, people's organizations and members of the Standing Committee of the National Committee of the Chinese People's Political Consultative Conference as the main body. The biweekly symposium was held every two weeks. On April 15, 1955, the Fifth Session of the Standing Committee of the 2nd National Committee of the CPPCC decided to change the biweekly symposium to be held irregularly and convened by the Secretary-General according to circumstances. After 1957, the biweekly symposium was renamed the Symposium of Democratic Parties and Non-Party Democrats, and people's organizations no longer sent representatives to participate. From April 1950 to July 1966, a total of 114 symposiums were held, and they were stopped after the start of the Cultural Revolution.

The 18th CCP National Congress in 2012 established the "socialist consultative democracy system". In March 2013, after Yu Zhengsheng was elected CPPCC Chairman, he proposed at the first Standing Committee meeting to hold more forums, based on sectors, combining thematic consultations with counterpart consultations, increasing the frequency of work, and expanding the participation of CPPCC members. On September 18, 2013, at the Sixth Chairman's Meeting of the CPPCC National Committee, the Presidium reviewed and approved the "Working Methods of Biweekly Consultative Forums (Trial)". On October 22, 2013, the first biweekly consultation forum was held. On May 18, 2017, the 59th Chairman's Meeting of the 12th CPPCC National Committee approved the "Working Rules of the Biweekly Consultative Forums of the CPPCC National Committee".

The biweekly consultation forums, the plenary sessions of the National Committee of the Chinese People's Political Consultative Conference, and the meetings of the Standing Committee of the National Committee of the Chinese People's Political Consultative Conference form the deliberative system of the National Committee of the Chinese People's Political Consultative Conference. Every year, there is one plenary session, four Standing Committee meetings, and 20 biweekly consultation forums. Since the 12th National Committee, the special consultation of the National Committee of the Chinese People's Political Consultative Conference has been divided into two levels: the first level is the special deliberative Standing Committee meetings and special consultation meetings, and the second level is the biweekly consultation forums.

In 2015, the General Office of the CCP Central Committee issued the “Implementation Opinions on Strengthening the Construction of Consultative Democracy in the CPPCC”, which put forward requirements for improving the biweekly consultation forum system. At the same time, local CPPCCs have learned from the practice of the biweekly consultation forums of the CPPCC National Committee and have begun to hold consultation forums in accordance with local needs.

== Definition ==
The biweekly consultation forum is held every two weeks, with about 20 CPPCC members participating each time, mostly non-CPC members. CPPCC members from all walks of life, especially members of democratic parties and non-party members, are invited to the forum to exchange views on the various policies formulated by the CCP, the relationship between the CPC and the democratic parties and people's organizations, united front work, and international and domestic current political affairs.

The biweekly consultation forums adopt a combination of thematic consultation and counterpart consultation. The participants are mainly CPPCC members from sectors related to the topic, most of whom are experts and scholars related to the topic. In addition, the heads of relevant departments of the CPC Central Committee and the State Council are invited to attend the forums to listen to their opinions. Many of the opinions and suggestions raised by CPPCC members at the biweekly consultation forums have been adopted by the CCP Central Committee and the State Council. Most of the topics for the biweekly consultation forums come from the CPPCC's annual consultation plan . In addition, some topics are arranged according to the central government's consultation needs, or are set by the CPPCC Chairman himself. Of the 20 topics in 2014, 15 came from the annual consultation plan.

The "Rules of Procedure for the Biweekly Consultation Meetings of the National Committee of the Chinese People's Political Consultative Conference" adopted in 2017 institutionalize the work of the biweekly consultation meetings. Article 5 stipulates: "The General Office shall collect topics for the biweekly consultation meetings from all members, special committees, and provincial (autonomous region, municipality) committees, and solicit opinions from relevant departments of the CPC Central Committee and the State Council, the central committees of the democratic parties, and the All-China Federation of Industry and Commerce. It shall consult with the General Office of the State Council to make arrangements and suggestions. The Chairman's Meeting shall review the arrangements for the annual biweekly consultation meetings and determine the topics, time, and hosting units. Key topics shall be included in the annual consultation plan and submitted to the CPC Central Committee for approval." Article 6 stipulates: "The biweekly consultation meetings shall be hosted by the relevant special committees, and some topics shall be jointly hosted by the central committees of the democratic parties and the All-China Federation of Industry and Commerce. The General Office shall be responsible for organizing and coordinating the meetings."
