= Two Sessions =

Political term in China

- Simplified Chinese: 两会
- Traditional Chinese: 兩會
- Literal meaning: two sessions
Transcriptions
Standard Mandarin
- Hanyu Pinyin: Liǎnghuì
- Wade–Giles: Liang3 Hui4

The "Two Sessions" in the People's Republic of China is the collective term for the annual plenary sessions of the National People's Congress and of the National Committee of the Chinese People's Political Consultative Conference, which are typically both held every March at the Great Hall of the People in Xicheng, Beijing around the same dates. The Two Sessions last for about ten days.

During the Two Sessions, the National People's Congress (NPC) and the Chinese People's Political Consultative Conference (CPPCC) hear and discuss reports from the premier of the State Council, the president of the Supreme People's Court, and the procurator-general.

== Use ==
The Two Sessions refer to the annual plenary sessions of the National People's Congress and the National Committee of the Chinese People's Political Consultative Conference, which are held at the same administrative level and around the same time. Meetings that do not belong to the same administrative region, are not at the same level, or are not held around the same time are not called the Two Sessions. The National People's Congress and the National Committee of the Chinese People's Political Consultative Conference usually convene around the same time in early March each year, and are therefore often referred to together as the Two Sessions.

The meetings of the local people's congresses at all levels and the local committees of the CPPCC are usually held around the same time at the beginning of each year, hence they are often referred to together as the local two sessions. The local two sessions is a general term for all local "two sessions", not referring to any one specific place.

The local people's congresses of China divided into:

1. Local people's congresses at the county level and above:

- The people's congresses of provinces, autonomous regions, and municipalities directly under the central government ;
- The people's congresses of autonomous prefectures and cities with districts (prefecture-level cities);
- The people's Congresses of counties, autonomous counties, cities without districts (county-level cities), and municipal districts;

2. People’s Congress of townships, ethnic townships and towns.

The local committees of the CPPCC are divided into:

1. Provincial, autonomous region, and municipal committees;
2. Autonomous prefectures, cities with districts, counties, autonomous counties, cities without districts, and municipal district committees.

"Local people's congresses and political consultative conferences" can only exist in the following administrative divisions:

1. Provinces, autonomous regions, and municipalities directly under the central government;
2. Autonomous prefectures and cities with districts;
3. Counties, autonomous counties, cities without districts, and municipal districts.

In townships, ethnic townships, and towns, only the People's Congress exists, but there are no township, ethnic township, or town committees of the Chinese People's Political Consultative Conference. Therefore, there is no "Two Sessions" in townships, ethnic townships, and towns.

For the "local two sessions," the term "two sessions" also refers to the People's Congress and the CPPCC sessions held at the same administrative level and roughly concurrently. For example, the People's Congress session and the local CPPCC session at the same administrative level are collectively referred to as the "local two sessions." Similarly, "Shanghai two sessions" refers to the "[number]th session of the [number]th Shanghai Municipal People's Congress" and the " [number]th session of the [number]th Shanghai Municipal Committee of the Chinese People's Political Consultative Conference," both held roughly concurrently. Likewise, "Shaanxi two sessions" refers to the "[number]th session of the [number] th Shaanxi Provincial People's Congress" and the "[number]th session of the Shaanxi Provincial Committee of the Chinese People's Political Consultative Conference," both held roughly concurrently.

== History ==
On 21 September 1949, the first plenary session of the Chinese People's Political Consultative Conference (CPPCC) opened, and the conference elected the members of the 1st National Committee of the CPPCC. In September 1954, the first session of the 1st National People's Congress (NPC) was held. On 25 December 1954, the first session of the 2nd National Committee of the CPPCC adopted the Charter of the Chinese People's Political Consultative Conference. In 1959, the first session of the 3rd National Committee of the CPPCC was held simultaneously with the first session of the 2nd National People's Congress (NPC), marking the first time that the NPC and the CPPCC were held simultaneously. The same was true in 1964. During the Cultural Revolution, they were no longer held simultaneously. In 1978, the first session of the 5th NPC and the first session of the 5th CPPCC were held simultaneously, thus making the number of sessions of the NPC and the CPPCC consistent.

The timing of the meetings of the local people's congresses at all levels and the meetings of the local committees of the CPPCC at the same level in the same administrative region has also been adjusted, and the situation varies from place to place. Moreover, since the local CPPCCs were established and started to hold meetings in the early 1949 to 1950s, while the local people's congresses were established and started to hold meetings after the promulgation and implementation of the first Constitution of the People's Republic of China in 1954, and the situation of the change of the people's congresses and CPPCCs in various places during the Cultural Revolution was different, the number of terms of the local people's congresses and CPPCCs is not necessarily the same. Moreover, the Chinese People's Political Consultative Conference must establish committees only in provinces, autonomous regions and municipalities directly under the central government; while in autonomous prefectures, cities with districts, counties, autonomous counties, cities without districts and municipal districts, it is only stipulated that committees can be established, on the premise of "wherever there are conditions", so these administrative regions may not establish CPPCCs. Some of these administrative regions started to establish CPPCCs very late, so their number of terms is even less likely to be the same as that of the people's congresses at the same level.

Currently, most local people's congresses and political consultative conferences are held at the beginning of each year, but there are still cases where they are not held at the beginning of the year. In some places, the people's congress and political consultative conferences are not held at the same time, and therefore cannot be called the Two Sessions. Like the National Congress of the Chinese Communist Party and the plenary session of the Central Committee of the Chinese Communist Party, which are usually held in the autumn, the Two Sessions are a key political event in the People's Republic of China and attract much attention and coverage from the news media. The term "Two Sessions" only began to appear gradually in the 1990s. It was initially used mainly in news media reports, and later gradually became familiar to the public. The 2026 Two Sessions took place from March 4 to March 12 and focused on economic development.

== Shared services ==
=== News service ===
The news preparation work for the annual "Two Sessions" usually begins very early. The news reporting group of the "Two Sessions" is responsible for the news reporting work of the NPC and the CPPCC. It and the general affairs group of the conference are the earliest organizations to start the preparation work for the conference.

The head of the news reporting team for the NPC and the CPPCC is the proposed spokesperson for the NPC. Other responsible persons usually include one deputy secretary-general of the Standing Committee of the NPC and one deputy secretary-general of the Standing Committee of the CPPCC National Committee, the director of the News Bureau of the General Office of the NPC Standing Committee and the Director of the News Bureau of the General Office of the CPPCC National Committee, as well as the heads of the CCP Publicity Department, the State Council Information Office, the National Radio and Television Administration, the People's Daily, Xinhua News Agency, and other units. Including the heads of news organizations in the news reporting team can give a general understanding of the issues that news organizations are concerned about, so "there are basically no issues that suddenly emerge".

The NPC and the CPPCC news reporting team consists of four groups: the Mainland Reporters Group, the Hong Kong and Taiwan Reporters Group, the Foreign Reporters Group, and the Press Conference Group, as well as one office. Among them, the Press Conference Group is mainly responsible for the preparation of the Premier's press conference. Its members come from the Foreign Affairs Committee of the NPC, the News Bureau of the General Office of the NPC Standing Committee, the State Council Information Office, and the Information Department of the Ministry of Foreign Affairs. The Press Conference Group is generally led by the head of the news reporting team.

The news reporting team for the NPC and the CPPCC usually starts operating from the end of December or the beginning of January. First, a news reporting plan is formulated. At the same time, the press conference team begins to prepare relevant materials. The first step in the preparation work of the news reporting team is to invite the heads of relevant ministries and commissions of the State Council to hold a symposium and ask them to introduce the situation of the issues that are of concern to domestic and foreign media in their respective fields of work. Such symposiums are usually held seven or eight times, covering areas including politics, economy, finance, political and legal affairs, Hong Kong and Taiwan, foreign affairs, the National People's Congress, social work, etc. On this basis, relevant departments put forward a list of relevant questions and suggestions on the answer guidelines. Subsequently, the news team summarizes the "Questions of Concern to the News Media and All Sectors of Society" and the reference draft of the answer guidelines based on these materials and the symposium situation.

During the tenure of Li Peng, Zhu Rongji, Wen Jiabao and Li Keqiang as Premiers of the State Council, a press conference was held after the closing of the Two Sessions. Before the press conference, the news reporting team and the heads of relevant departments of the State Council would usually hold a small symposium under the chairmanship of the Premier of the State Council to check the preparations in all aspects. The Two Sessions often set up a common "Two Sessions News Center" which is responsible for news services for the National People's Congress and the Chinese People's Political Consultative Conference. The National Two Sessions have been setting up news centers since the end of the 20th century. The situation of setting up news centers in local Two Sessions varies, and some places have not yet established the habit of setting up news centers for the Two Sessions.

=== Service and reception ===
Since a large number of NPC deputies and CPPCC members will be gathered during the Two Sessions, the service and reception work for them has become the focus of the relevant government departments. The service and reception work includes accommodation, catering, transportation, security and other work. Among them, the service and reception work for the National People's Congress and the Chinese People's Political Consultative Conference is the most arduous, and is jointly undertaken by the relevant departments of the central government and Beijing.

The Two Sessions period is generally a critical time for the security work of the central government and local governments. Taking the National People's Congress and the Chinese People's Political Consultative Conference (NPC and CPPCC) as an example, on the eve of the 2009 NPC and CPPCC sessions in Beijing, the Beijing Municipal Public Security Bureau stated that the number of auxiliary police security personnel for the NPC and CPPCC sessions, composed of community patrol members, security guards, etc., had reached 600,000. On the eve of the 2010 NPC and CPPCC sessions in Beijing, the Beijing Municipal Public Security Bureau stated that 700,000 community residents in Beijing participated in the security work for the NPC and CPPCC sessions.

== Other uses of the term ==
During the 2011 Chinese pro-democracy protests, the term for the Two Sessions in Chinese, lianghui, became a covert means of avoiding Internet censorship. When PRC censors attempted to limit news of the Arab Spring by disabling internet searches for Chinese words such as "Egypt," "Tunisia," and "jasmine", protest organizers urged bloggers and activists to call planned protests lianghui. If the government were to censor this dissenters' circumlocution, it would effectively block internet news about the governmental NPC and CPPCC meetings.

== See also ==
- Politics of the People's Republic of China
