= Secretary-General of the National Committee of the Chinese People's Political Consultative Conference =

- 中国人民政治协商会议 全国委员会秘书长
- Emblem of the Chinese People's Political Consultative Conference

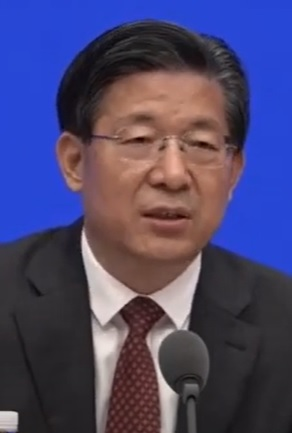
- Incumbent; Wang Dongfeng since 10 March 2023
- General Office of the National Committee of the Chinese People's Political Consultative Conference
- Status: Provincial and ministerial-level official
- Member of: Standing Committee of the National Committee; Chairperson's Council
- Residence: CPPCC National Committee Office Building
- Nominator: Presidium of the Plenary Session of the National Committee (chosen within the Chinese Communist Party)
- Appointer: Plenary Session of the National Committee
- Term length: Five years, renewable
- Constituting instrument: Charter of the CPPCC
- Inaugural holder: Li Weihan
- Deputy: Deputy Secretary-General

The secretary-general of the National Committee of the Chinese People's Political Consultative Conference is a political office in the People's Republic of China. The secretary-general heads the General Office of the National Committee of the Chinese People's Political Consultative Conference (CPPCC), which is a political advisory body in the People's Republic of China.

The secretary-general is officially nominated within the CPPCC National Committee and approved by a plenary session of the National Committee. The secretary-general is a member of the Standing Committee of the National Committee, which handles the regular affairs of the body, and is a member of the Chairperson's Council, which handles the day-to-day affairs of the Standing Committee. The secretary-general is assisted by deputy secretaries-general, appointed or dismissed by the National Committee on the proposal of the secretary-general. The secretary-general and deputy secretaries-general jointly constitute the Meeting of the Secretaries-General of the CPPCC National Committee, which is presided by the secretary-general.

== List of officeholders ==
| No. (Note: These numbers are not official.) | Term(s) | Name (birth–death) | Picture | Took office | Left Office | Tenure | Important offices held during tenure | CPPCC Chairperson | Ref. |
|---|---|---|---|---|---|---|---|---|---|
| 1 | 1st | Li Weihan (1896–1984) | | October 8, 1949 | December 25, 1954 | 5 years, 78 days | Head of the United Front Work Department; Secretary-General of the Government Administration Council; Head of the Ethnic Affairs Commission; Government Chief Plenipotentiary Representative of the Central People's Government to Tibet | Mao Zedong | |
| 2 | 2nd | Xu Bing (1903–1972) | | December 25, 1954 | April 29, 1959 | 4 years, 125 days | Alternate member of the CCP Central Committee; Member of the Standing Committee of the National People's Congress | Zhou Enlai | |
| 2 | 3rd | Xu Bing (1903–1972) | | April 29, 1959 | January 5, 1965 | 5 years, 251 days | Alternate member of the CCP Central Committee; Member of the Standing Committee of the National People's Congress | Zhou Enlai | |
| 3 | 4th | Ping Jiesan (1906–2001) | | January 5, 1965 | March 8, 1978 | 13 years, 62 days | Secretary of the Party Leadership Group of the CPPCC National Committee | Zhou Enlai | |
| 4 | 5th | Qi Yanming (1907–1978) | | March 8, 1978 | October 21, 1978 | 227 days | Secretary of the Party Leadership Group of the CPPCC National Committee | Deng Xiaoping | |
| 5 | 5th | Liu Lantao (1910–1997) | | July 2, 1979 | June 17, 1983 | 3 years, 350 days | Member of the Standing Committee of the Central Advisory Commission; Vice Chairman of the CPPCC National Committee | Deng Xiaoping | |
| 6 | 6th | Peng Youjin (1914–2005) | | June 17, 1983 | October 8, 1985 | 2 years, 124 days | Secretary of the Party Leadership Group of the CPPCC National Committee | Deng Yingchao | |
| 7 | 6th | Zhou Shaozheng (1926–2007) | | April 11, 1986 | April 10, 1988 | 1 year, 365 days | Secretary of the Party Leadership Group of the CPPCC National Committee | Deng Yingchao | |
| 7 | 7th | Zhou Shaozheng (1926–2007) | | April 10, 1988 | March 14, 1990 | 1 year, 338 days | Secretary of the Party Leadership Group of the CPPCC National Committee | Li Xiannian | |
| 8 | 7th | Song Demin (1930–2021) | | April 1991 | March 27, 1993 | 1 year, 360 days | Secretary of the Party Leadership Group of the CPPCC National Committee | Li Xiannian | |
| 8 | 8th | Song Demin (1930–2021) | | March 27, 1993 | March 19, 1994 | 357 days | Secretary of the Party Leadership Group of the CPPCC National Committee | Li Ruihuan | |
| 9 | 8th | Zhu Xun (born 1930) | | March 19, 1994 | March 13, 1998 | 3 years, 359 days | Secretary of the Party Leadership Group of the CPPCC National Committee | Li Ruihuan | |
| 10 | 9th | Zheng Wantong (born 1941) | | March 13, 1998 | March 13, 2003 | 5 years, 0 days | Secretary of the Party Leadership Group of the CPPCC National Committee | Li Ruihuan | |
| 10 | 10th | Zheng Wantong (born 1941) | | March 13, 2003 | March 13, 2008 | 5 years, 0 days | Secretary of the Party Leadership Group of the CPPCC National Committee | Jia Qinglin | |
| 11 | 11th | Qian Yunlu (born 1944) | | March 13, 2008 | March 11, 2013 | 4 years, 357 days | Member of the CCP Central Committee; Vice Chairman of the CPPCC National Committee | Jia Qinglin | |
| 12 | 12th | Zhang Qingli (born 1951) | | March 11, 2013 | March 14, 2018 | 5 years, 3 days | Member of the CCP Central Committee; Secretary of the Party Leadership Group of the CPPCC National Committee; Vice Chairman of the CPPCC National Committee | Yu Zhengsheng | |
| 13 | 13th | Xia Baolong (born 1952) | | March 14, 2018 | May 27, 2020 | 2 years, 74 days | Secretary of the Party Leadership Group of the CPPCC National Committee; Vice Chairman of the CPPCC National Committee; Director of the Hong Kong and Macao Affairs Office | Wang Yang | |
| 14 | 13th | Li Bin (born 1954) | 李斌 | May 27, 2020 | March 10, 2023 | 2 years, 287 days | Secretary of the Party Leadership Group of the CPPCC National Committee; Vice Chairwoman of the CPPCC National Committee; Chairwoman of the China Soong Ching Ling Foundation | Wang Yang | |
| 15 | 14th | Wang Dongfeng (born 1958) | | March 10, 2023 | Incumbent | 3 years, 181 days | Vice Chairman of the CPPCC National Committee | Wang Huning | |

== See also ==
- National Committee of the Chinese People's Political Consultative Conference
  - Chairperson
  - Vice-Chairpersons
- Standing Committee of the National People's Congress
  - Secretary-General
