= Chairman of the National Committee of the Chinese People's Political Consultative Conference =

Leader of a political advisory body in the People's Republic of China

Chairman of National Committee of the Chinese People's Political Consultative Conference
- 中国人民政治协商会议 全国委员会主席
- Emblem of the Chinese People's Political Consultative Conference

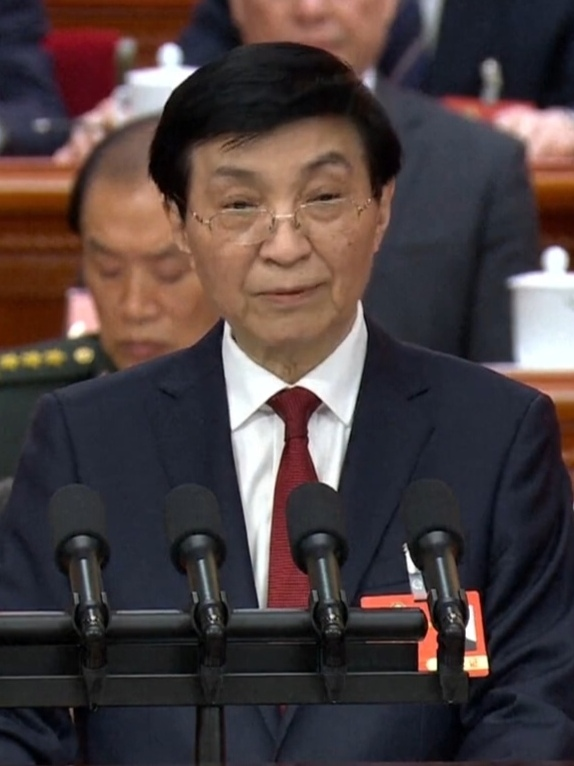
- Incumbent; Wang Huning since 10 March 2023
- National Committee of the Chinese People's Political Consultative Conference
- Type: Presiding officer
- Status: National-level official
- Member of: Standing Committee of the National Committee; Chairperson's Council
- Nominator: Presidium of the Plenary Session of the National Committee (chosen within the Chinese Communist Party)
- Appointer: Plenary Session of the National Committee
- Term length: Five years, renewable
- Constituting instrument: Charter of the CPPCC
- Inaugural holder: Mao Zedong
- Formation: 9 October 1949; 76 years ago
- Deputy: Vice Chairpersons; Secretary-General
- Salary: CN¥150,000 per annum est. (2015)

Chairperson of the National Committee of the Chinese People's Political Consultative Conference
- Simplified Chinese: 中国人民政治协商会议全国委员会主席
Transcriptions
Standard Mandarin
- Hanyu Pinyin: Zhōngguó Rénmín Zhèngzhì Xiéshāng Huìyì Quánguó Wěiyuánhuì Zhǔxí

Alternative Chinese name
- Simplified Chinese: 全国政协主席
Transcriptions
Standard Mandarin
- Hanyu Pinyin: Quánguó Zhèngxié Zhǔxí

The chairman of the National Committee of the Chinese People's Political Consultative Conference is the leader of the National Committee of the Chinese People's Political Consultative Conference (CPPCC), which is a political advisory body in the People's Republic of China.

The chairman is officially nominated within the CPPCC National Committee and approved by a plenary session of the National Committee. The chairman is a member of the Standing Committee of the National Committee, which handles the regular affairs of the body, and presides over its work. The chairman is also a member of the Chairperson's Council, which handles the day-to-day affairs of the Standing Committee. The chairman is assisted in their work by vice chairpersons and the secretary-general of the National Committee. The chairman is usually the leader of the united front system of the Chinese Communist Party (CCP), being the head of the principal forum for united front work.

Since its establishment, all CPPCC chairpersons have been a member of the Politburo Standing Committee of the CCP except during transition periods, being at least its 4th-ranking member. The incumbent chairman is Wang Huning, who is the 4th-ranking member of the PSC.

== Roles ==
The chairman is central to the united front system of the CCP. According to Sinologist Peter Mattis, the role "largely consists of public appearances, speaking engagements, and pressing the flesh to ensure the party’s ideas remain paramount". The chairman speaks at the department directors’ meeting (全国统战部长会议) of the United Front Work Department (UFWD) held around every December or January, with the Chinese state media emphasizing the role of the chairman and their speeches over the UFWD director, who nominally presides over the meeting.

The chairman leads the Leading Party Members Group of the CPPCC, which is responsible for overseeing the implementation of CCP Central Committee policies in the CPPCC. The chairman usually leads the Central Xinjiang Work Coordination Group and the Central Tibet Work Coordination Group the top CCP decision-making bodies on Xinjiang and Tibet, and is usually the deputy leader of the Central Leading Group for Taiwan Affairs, the top CCP decision-making body regarding Taiwan. Additionally, though not required by law, the chairman also generally serves as the leader of the China Council for the Promotion of Peaceful National Reunification (CCPPNR), a united front organization tasked to advance unification with Taiwan.

== List of chairpersons ==
Multiple terms in office, consecutive or otherwise, are listed and counted in the first column counts individuals and the second column (term number).

Generations of leadership

- Mao Zedong administration
- Deng Xiaoping administration
- Jiang Zemin administration
- Hu Jintao administration
- Xi Jinping administration

No.	Chairperson	Term	Term of office	
No.	Chairperson	Term	Took office	Left office
1	Mao Zedong 毛泽东	1st	9 October 1949	25 December 1954
2	Zhou Enlai 周恩来	2nd	25 December 1954	29 April 1959
2	Zhou Enlai 周恩来	3rd	29 April 1959	5 January 1965
2	Zhou Enlai 周恩来	4th	5 January 1965	8 January 1976
During this interval, the office was vacant. (January 1976 – March 1978)
3	Deng Xiaoping 邓小平	5th	8 March 1978	17 June 1983
4	Deng Yingchao 邓颖超	6th	17 June 1983	10 April 1988
5	Li Xiannian 李先念	7th	10 April 1988	21 June 1992
During this interval, the office was vacant. (June 1992 – March 1993)
6	Li Ruihuan 李瑞环	8th	27 March 1993	13 March 1998
6	Li Ruihuan 李瑞环	9th	13 March 1998	13 March 2003
7	Jia Qinglin 贾庆林	10th	13 March 2003	13 March 2008
7	Jia Qinglin 贾庆林	11th	13 March 2008	11 March 2013
8	Yu Zhengsheng 俞正声	12th	11 March 2013	14 March 2018
9	Wang Yang 汪洋	13th	14 March 2018	10 March 2023
10	Wang Huning 王沪宁	14th	10 March 2023	Incumbent
