= Chinese Literature and History Press =

Publishing house of China's political advisory body

- Traditional Chinese: 中國文史出版社
- Simplified Chinese: 中国文史出版社
Transcriptions
Standard Mandarin
- Hanyu Pinyin: Zhōngguó Wén Shǐ Chūbǎnshè
- Wade–Giles: Chung-kuo Wen Shih Ch`u-pan-she

Literary and Historical Document Press
- Traditional Chinese: 文史資料出版社
- Simplified Chinese: 文史资料出版社
Transcriptions
Standard Mandarin
- Hanyu Pinyin: Wén Shǐ Zīliào Chūbǎnshè
- Wade–Giles: Wen Shih Tzu-liao Ch`u-pan-she

The Chinese Literature and History Press (Note: Variously also translated as China's Literature and History Press, the Chinese Culture and History Press, the Chinese Literary Press, the Chinese Literary History Press, and the China Written History Press.) is the publishing house of the National Committee of the Chinese People's Political Consultative Conference. It is based in Beijing and managed by the General Office of the CPPCC National Committee.

== History ==
The Literary and Historical Document Press was approved by the National Publishing Bureau (Note: Chinese: t 國家出版侷, s 国家出版局, p Guójiā Chūbǎn Jú.) in January 1980. It was renamed in November 1985.
