= Standing Committee of China =

Standing Committee of China may refer to:

- Politburo Standing Committee of the Chinese Communist Party
- Standing Committee of the Central Commission for Discipline Inspection
- Standing Committee of the National People's Congress
- Standing Committee of the National Committee of the Chinese People's Political Consultative Conference
