= China Institute of Theory on the Chinese People's Political Consultative Conference =

Organization in Beijing, China

- 中国人民政协理论研究会
- Formation: 20 December 2006
- Type: People's organization
- Headquarters: No. 23 Taipingqiao Street, Xicheng, Beijing
- President: Li Bin
- Parent organization: National Committee of the Chinese People's Political Consultative Conference

China Institute of Theory on the Chinese People's Political Consultative Conference
- Simplified Chinese: 中国人民政协理论研究会
- Traditional Chinese: 中國人民政協理論研究會
Transcriptions
Standard Mandarin
- Hanyu Pinyin: Zhōngguó Rénmín Zhèngxié Lǐlùn Yánjiūhuì

The China Institute of Theory on the Chinese People's Political Consultative Conference (CITCPPCC) is a people's organization under the leadership of the National Committee of the Chinese People's Political Consultative Conference (CPPCC).

== History ==
The Institute was founded on 20 December 2006 in Beijing.

== Functions ==
The Institute is an organization registered under the CPPCC National Committee. It is officially engaged in "research and promotion of the multi-party cooperation and political consultation system led by the Chinese Communist Party and the People's Political Consultative Conference theory under the leadership of the National Committee of the Chinese People's Political Consultative Conference". It is managed by the CPPCC National Committee General Office and is registered with the Ministry of Civil Affairs. It adheres to the overall leadership of the Chinese Communist Party (CCP).
