= 2026 Two Sessions =

Chinese government meeting

The 2026 Two Sessions in the People's Republic of China, the annual plenary sessions of the National People's Congress (NPC) and of the National Committee of the Chinese People's Political Consultative Conference (CPPCC), began on March 4 and concluded on March 12. The conference focused on review of the prior year's economic performance and planned for future development. During the Two Sessions, the NPC and the CPPCC heard and discussed reports from the premier of the State Council, the president of the Supreme People's Court, and the procurator-general.

The opening ceremony in 2026 featured a keynote speech from the premier Li Qiang which focused on "orderly multipolarism". The CCP general secretary Xi Jinping encouraged provincial governments to continue their work in technological development. The Office of the Central Foreign Affairs Commission director Wang Yi presented additional policy on foreign relations during the summit.

The two bodies reviewed Government Work Report which summarizes the planned and actual performance of government activity in 2025. The CCP has supported a system of state banks which provide substantial credit to the global economy. These banks expanded in 2025 and are supported by the government for continued credit expansion. The "cross-border e-commerce plus overseas warehouses model", green energy, and advanced technology were highlighted as important areas for continued investment. It also discussed on-going reforms to attract more foreign direct investment to China. Social welfare in China is relatively limited compared to western nations. The work report discussed existing efforts to expand this system which are expected to continue.

The NPC approved three new laws. The Ecology and Environment Code to strengthen existing environmental regulation. The Law on Promoting Ethnic Unity and Progress which furthers Xi's agenda to promote ethnic unity. One method of doing so is increasing the mandatory Mandarin education in place of some Mongolian, Tibetan and Uyghur curriculum. The National Development Planning Law to reform some processes for development plans.

The 15th Five-Year Plan was approved on March 12 as the sanctioned prescription for the Chinese economy. It orders the country to improve its capacity for innovation. Rather than purely targeting growth, the plan calls for "High Quality Development".
