= Council of Chairpersons =

Council of Chairpersons may refer to:

- Council of Chairpersons of the Standing Committee of the National People's Congress
- Chairperson's Council of the National Committee of the Chinese People's Political Consultative Conference
