= China Committee on Religion and Peace =

Organization in Beijing, China

- 中国宗教界和平委员会
- Formation: 3 July 1994
- Type: Social organization
- President: Pagbalha Geleg Namgyai
- Parent organization: National Committee of the Chinese People's Political Consultative Conference

China Committee on Religion and Peace
- Simplified Chinese: 中国宗教界和平委员会
- Traditional Chinese: 中國宗教界和平委員會
Transcriptions
Standard Mandarin
- Hanyu Pinyin: Zhōngguó Zōngjiàojiè Hépíng Wěiyuánhuì

Alternative Chinese name
- Chinese: 中宗和
Transcriptions
Standard Mandarin
- Hanyu Pinyin: Zhōngzōnghé

The China Committee on Religion and Peace (CCRP) is a social organization under the leadership of the National Committee of the Chinese People's Political Consultative Conference (CPPCC). It is composed of representatives from China's five major religions: Buddhism, Taoism, Islam, Catholicism, and Protestantism. The majority of its members are also members of the CPPCC National Committee's sector of religion.

== History ==
The CCRP was established on 3 July 1994, mostly by members of the Committee for Ethnic and Religious Affairs.

== Functions ==
The CCPR is an organization registered under the CPPCC National Committee. It is composed of representatives from China's five major religions: Buddhism, Taoism, Islam, Catholicism, and Protestantism. The majority of its members are also members of the CPPCC National Committee's sector of religion. It is affiliated with the Religions for Peace.
