= China Economic and Social Council =

Organization in Beijing, China

- 中国经济社会理事会
- Formation: 2 July 2001
- Type: Social organization
- Headquarters: No. 23 Taipingqiao Street, Xicheng, Beijing
- Chairman: Du Qinglin
- Parent organization: National Committee of the Chinese People's Political Consultative Conference

China Economic and Social Council
- Simplified Chinese: 中国经济社会理事会
- Traditional Chinese: 中國經濟社會理事會
Transcriptions
Standard Mandarin
- Hanyu Pinyin: Zhōngguó Jīngjì Shèhuì Lǐshì Huì

The China Economic and Social Council (CESC) is a social organization under the leadership of the National Committee of the Chinese People's Political Consultative Conference (CPPCC) that studies economic and social issues.

== History ==
The China Economic and Social Research Society was founded on 2 July 2001. On 19 November 2004, it was renamed to the China Economic and Social Council.

== Functions ==
The CESC is an organization registered under the CPPCC National Committee. It studies economic and social issues. It is a member of the International Association of Economic and Social Councils and Similar Institutions.
