= List of current members of CPPCC by sector =

Seats by sex
1. Male (81.48%)
2. Female (18.52%)

This article involves current Chinese People's Political Consultative Congress members who were last elected in March 2013.

The Chinese Communist Party and its eight subservient United Front political parties participate in the CPPCC. Besides political parties, the CPPCC also invites of representatives from various sectors of society.

== Current sectors ==
As of 29 June 2017. Members are divided into several sectors, including political parties, people's organizations, etc.

Sector	Sub-sector	Seats	Famous members
Political Party	Chinese Communist Party	97	Yu Zhengsheng, Zhou Xiaochuan, Jiang Weixin, Yuan Guiren, Geng Huichang
Political Party	Revolutionary Committee of the Chinese Kuomintang	65	Feng Gong
Political Party	China Democratic League	65	
Political Party	China Democratic National Construction Association	64	
Political Party	China Association for Promoting Democracy	45	Zhu Yongxin
Political Party	Chinese Peasants' and Workers' Democratic Party	45	
Political Party	China Zhi Gong Party	29	Wan Gang
Political Party	Jiusan Society	44	
Political Party	Taiwan Democratic Self-Government League	20	
Political Party	Nonpartisan	62	David Daokui Li, Zhang Kangkang, Chen Daoming, Justin Yifu Lin, Yuan Longping, Cui Yongyuan
Total		536	
People's Organization	Communist Youth League	9	
People's Organization	All-China Federation of Trade Unions	60	
People's Organization	All-China Women's Federation	64	Chi Zijian
People's Organization	All-China Youth Federation	28	Zhu Jun, Zhou Tao, Han Hong
People's Organization	All-China Federation of Industry and Commerce	61	Robin Li
People's Organization	China Association for Science and Technology	43	Deng Nan, Gu Binglin
People's Organization	All-China Federation of Taiwan Compatriots	15	
People's Organization	All-China Federation of Returned Overseas	27	
Total		307	
Occupation	Culture and Art	142	Wang Anyi, Feng Xiaogang, Feng Jicai, Gong Hanlin, Jackie Chan, Liu Lanfang (刘兰芳), Yu Long, Song Dandan, Song Zuying, Zhang Guoli, Chen Kaige, Zhao Benshan, Jiang Kun, Mo Yan, Huang Hong, Yan Weiwen, Cai Fuchao, Pu Cunxin
Occupation	Science and Technology	110	Pan Jianwei
Occupation	Social Science	71	Mao Xinyu, Ye Xiaowen
Occupation	Economy	149	Li Yining, Xu Jiayin, Li Xiaolin, Li Yizhong, Shang Fulin, Yi Gang, Xu Shaoshi, Gao Hucheng, Cao Dewang (曹德旺), Chang Zhenming
Occupation	Agriculture	67	Jiang Zehui (江泽慧)
Occupation	Education	113	Zhu Yanlai (朱燕来), Yu Minhong
Occupation	Sport	21	Liu Xiang, Li Yongbo, Zou Kai, Zhou Jihong, Yao Ming, Huang Yubin
Occupation	News Publication	44	Bai Yansong, Han Sanping
Occupation	Medical Science	88	Huang Jiefu (黄洁夫)
Occupation	Foreign Friendship	42	Cui Tiankai
Occupation	Social Welfare and Social Security	37	Zhang Haidi
Occupation	Ethnic Group	101	Hai Xia, Tengger
Occupation	Religion	65	Pagbalha Geleg Namgyai, Xuecheng, Gyaincain Norbu
Total		1050	
Specially Invite	Hong Kong	124	Henry Tang Ying-yen, Leung Chun-ying, Andrew Leung Kwan-yuen, Andrew Liao Cheung-sing, Tam Yiu-chung, Timothy Fok Tsun-ting
Specially Invite	Macau	29	Edmund Ho Hau-wah, Chui Sai Cheong
Specially Invite	Others	154	Ning Jizhe
Total		307	
