= Central Tibet Work Coordination Group =

Chinese Communist Party body

- 中央西藏工作协调小组
- Emblem of the Chinese Communist Party

Agency overview
- Type: Policy coordination and consultation body
- Jurisdiction: Chinese Communist Party
- Headquarters: Beijing
- Agency executive: Wang Huning, Director
- Parent agency: Party Central Committee

Central Tibet Work Coordination Group
- Simplified Chinese: 中央西藏工作协调小组
- Traditional Chinese: 中央西藏工作協調小組
Transcriptions
Standard Mandarin
- Hanyu Pinyin: Zhōngyāng Xīzàng Gōngzuò Xiétiáo Xiǎozǔ

The Central Tibet Work Coordination Group is a deliberative and coordinating body established by the Central Committee of the Chinese Communist Party for Tibet work. The Central Tibet Work Coordination Group has an office responsible for handling the daily work of the Coordination Group. The Office of the Central Tibet Work Coordination Group Office is located in the United Front Work Department.

== Functions ==
The Group is the Central Committee's deliberative and coordinating body on Tibet work. The Coordination Group does not have corresponding deliberative and coordinating bodies at the local level. The Group has at least two research working groups, one on foreign affairs and the other on economic and social development. it is responsible for organizing the Tibet Work Forums.

== Leadership ==
The Central Tibet Work Coordination Group has a leader, deputy leaders and members. The Group has been led by the chairman of the Chinese People's Political Consultative Conference.

Head of the Central Tibet Affairs Coordination Group

1. Jia Qinglin (2008–2013)
2. Yu Zhengsheng (2013–2018)
3. Wang Yang (2018–2023)
4. Wang Huning (2023-)

Director of the Office of the Central Tibet Affairs Coordination Group

1. Lin Rui (2006–2010, Deputy Minister of the United Front Work Department of the CPC Central Committee)

Deputy Director of the Office of the Central Tibet Affairs Coordination Group

1. Star (2018 -)
2. Zheng Dui (2000–2010, also Director General of the China Tibetology Research Center)

Member of the Central Tibet Affairs Coordination Group

1. Du Ying (2006–2010, concurrently head of the special working group on economic and social development of the Central Tibet Work Coordination Group)
