= CPPCC Daily =

Chinese daily newspaper

- Type: Daily newspaper
- Owner: National Committee of the Chinese People's Political Consultative Conference
- Publisher: CPPCC Daily Press
- President: Xu Shuitao
- Editor-in-chief: Zhou Beichuan
- Founded: 6 April 1983; 43 years ago
- Language: Chinese
- Headquarters: 69, Xibalizhuang Road, Haidian District, Beijing
- Country: China
- Website: dzb.rmzxb.com.cn

CPPCC Daily
- Simplified Chinese: 人民政协报
- Traditional Chinese: 人民政協報
Transcriptions
Standard Mandarin
- Hanyu Pinyin: Rénmín Zhèngxiébào

The CPPCC Daily is the official newspaper of the National Committee of the Chinese People's Political Consultative Conference.

== History ==
On March 20, 1982, under the chairmanship of Nie Zhen, deputy secretary-general of the CPPCC and deputy director of the Academic Committee, the Office of the Academic Committee of the CPPCC drafted the "Opinions on the Establishment of the CPPCC Herald". The CPPCC Herald was one of the first candidates, along with the People's Political Consultative Conference Newspaper, the People's Forum Newspaper, and the Democratic Consultation Newspaper. On April 9, the Office of the Academic Committee of the CPPCC invited members of the CPPCC journal editorial committee and heads of the propaganda departments of various democratic parties to a discussion. On April 14, the Party Group of the CPPCC invited heads of newspapers and periodicals of various democratic parties to a discussion. Based on these two discussions, the name of the newspaper was determined to be the CPPCC Daily.

On September 16, the Party Group of the CPPCC submitted a "Request Report on the Establishment of the CPPCC Daily" to the United Front Work Department and the Secretariat of the Chinese Communist Party (CCP). On November 9, the first trial issue of the CPPCC Daily was published. Subsequently, the second trial issue was published for internal distribution. On November 24, the Fifth Session of the 5th National Committee of the CPPCC announced the decision to establish the CPPCC Daily in the "Work Report of the CPPCC Standing Committee". On December 18, the General Office of the CCP responded to the request report, stating that "the request of the Party Group of the National Committee of the Chinese People's Political Consultative Conference to establish the CPPCC Daily has been approved by the Central Secretariat." It also stated that "the main task of the CPPCC Daily is to adhere to the Four Cardinal Principles, implement the Party's united front policy, and strive to run the newspaper well."

On January 10, 1983, the Party Group of the CPPCC National Committee put forward several opinions on the publication of the CPPCC Daily. On January 12, the Party Group of the CPPCC National Committee submitted a report on the issue of publishing the newspaper to the Publicity Department and the United Front Work Department. On March 9, CPPCC Secretary-General Peng Youjin and Deputy Secretary-General Sun Qimeng wrote to CPPCC Chairman Deng Xiaoping, asking him to write the title of the newspaper. On April 6, 1983, the CPPCC Daily was first published. It was a four-page spread published every Wednesday, with a circulation of more than 35,000 copies in its first issue. The title was written by Deng Xiaoping, and congratulatory messages were written by party and state leaders and CPPCC leaders Lu Dingyi, Xu Deheng, Hu Juewen, Shi Liang, Wang Kunlun, Hu Yuzhi, etc. In accordance with the CCP Central Committee's instruction to "establish a party group for the CPPCC Daily", the newspaper established a party group consisting of Sa Kongle, Xu Ying, and Xu Yian, and accepted the leadership of the CPPCC Party Group. The newspaper also established an editorial committee consisting of Sa Kongle, Xu Ying, Wang Yi, Yu Huanchun, Shen Qiuwo, Ye Duyi, Yu Xiaozhong, Huang Sen, Xu Yian, and Zhang Xiluo. The editor-in-chief was Sa Kongle, and the deputy editors-in-chief were Xu Yian and Zhang Xiluo.

On January 1, 1997, the newspaper changed from a Wednesday publication to a Saturday publication, becoming a daily newspaper. He Luli, vice chairman of the National Committee of the Chinese People's Political Consultative Conference, a letter to congratulate the success of the change to a daily newspaper. Ye Xuanping, Yang Rudai, Wang Zhaoguo, Qian Weichang, and Fuling wrote inscriptions to congratulate the change to a daily newspaper. On January 1, 1999, the newspaper changed from a Saturday publication to a seven-day On January 1, 2000, the layout was adjusted to eight pages from Monday to Friday and four pages on Saturday. On February 25, 2000, the newspaper announced that the CPPCC Daily was available online, and a new column was added to the CPPCC website. On March 1, 2014, the newly revised CPPCC website was officially launched.

On September 20, 2002, the CPPCC Daily Building with a total construction area of 20,000 square meters was completed at No. 69 Xibalizhuang Road. Vice Chairmen of the National Committee of the Chinese People's Political Consultative Conference Song Jian, Chen Jinhua, Zhang Kehui, and Secretary General Zheng Wantong attended the completion ceremony and cut the ribbon. On January 16, 2003, CPPCC Chairman Li Ruihuan visited the newspaper office to visit all employees. Since 2004, the newspaper has expanded its edition to publish a color version. On December 30, 2005, the CPPCC Daily Editorial Committee was established and held its first meeting. On April 3, 2013, CPPCC Chairman Yu Zhengsheng visited the CPPCC Daily and proposed to "make the CPPCC Daily a newspaper that members of the CPPCC want to read, love to read, and is beneficial to reading".

== Content ==
The CPPCC Daily adheres to the principle of "taking a root in the united front and facing the society" and serves the CPPCC organizations at all levels in fulfilling their functions and the CPPCC members in participating in the political affairs and making decisions. It is published by the CPPCC Daily Press. The CPPCC website is a new media managed and hosted by the CPPCC National Committee, and is operated by the CPPCC Newspaper Network Co., Ltd., a wholly owned subsidiary of the CPPCC Newspaper.
