= Charter of the Chinese People's Political Consultative Conference =

The Charter of the Chinese People's Political Consultative Conference outlines the basic principles of the Chinese People's Political Consultative Conference (CPPCC).

== History ==
On September 27, 1949, the first plenary session of the Chinese People's Political Consultative Conference adopted the "Organizational Law of the Chinese People's Political Consultative Conference".

In 1954, the first session of the 1st National People's Congress promulgated the Constitution of the People's Republic of China, meaning that the existing Organization Law of the Chinese People's Political Consultative Conference was no longer fully suitable for the current situation. In February 1953, the fourth session of the 1st National Committee of the Chinese People's Political Consultative Conference resolved to study and revise the Organization Law of the Chinese People's Political Consultative Conference and entrusted the Standing Committee of the 1st National Committee to do this work. According to the resolution, the Standing Committee organized a drafting group to draft the Constitution of the Chinese People's Political Consultative Conference. The draft was amended and adopted at the 64th meeting of the Standing Committee to the first plenary session of the 2nd National Committee of the Chinese People's Political Consultative Conference for review and decision. On December 21, 1954, Zhang Bojun stated in his explanation of the draft that "the first thing that needs to be explained is the name issue. We believe that the 'Organization Law of the Chinese People's Political Consultative Conference' should be changed to the 'Constitution of the Chinese People's Political Consultative Conference'... ".

On December 25, 1954, the first session of the 2nd National Committee of the Chinese People's Political Consultative Conference adopted the "Constitution of the Chinese People's Political Consultative Conference", which was the first constitution of the CPPCC. On March 8, 1978, the first session of the 5th National Committee of the Chinese People's Political Consultative Conference adopted the "Constitution of the Chinese People's Political Consultative Conference", which was the second constitution. On December 11, 1982, the fifth session of the 5th National Committee of the Chinese People's Political Consultative Conference adopted the "Constitution of the Chinese People's Political Consultative Conference", which is the third and current constitution.

An amendment was adopted at the second session of the 8th National Committee of the Chinese People's Political Consultative Conference on March 19, 1994. Another amendment was adopted at the third session of the 9th National Committee of the Chinese People's Political Consultative Conference on March 11, 2000. A revised amendment was adopted at the second session of the 10th National Committee of the Chinese People's Political Consultative Conference on March 12, 2004. An amendment was adopted at the first session of the 13th National Committee of the Chinese People's Political Consultative Conference on March 15, 2018. An amendment was adopted at the first session of the 14th National Committee of the Chinese People's Political Consultative Conference on March 11, 2023.

== Content ==
Currently, the Charter of the Chinese People's Political Consultative Conference is divided into seven parts:

- General Program: defines the nature, functions and fundamental principles of the Chinese People's Political Consultative Conference
- Chapter 1 General Principles of Work: stipulates the main functions and working methods of the National Committee and local committees of the Chinese People's Political Consultative Conference
- Chapter 2 General Principles of Organization: stipulates the organizational relationship, composition method, rights and obligations of the National Committee and local committees of the Chinese People's Political Consultative Conference
- Chapter 3 Members
- Chapter 4 National Committee: stipulates the composition of the National Committee of the Chinese People's Political Consultative Conference, the powers of the plenary sessions, the composition and powers of the Standing Committee
- Chapter 5 Local Committees: stipulates the conditions for the establishment, composition, powers of the plenary sessions, composition and powers of the Standing Committee of the local committees of the Chinese People's Political Consultative Conference
- Chapter 6 Emblem

== See also ==
- Constitution of China
- Constitution of the Chinese Communist Party
