= Chairperson's Council of the National Committee of the Chinese People's Political Consultative Conference =

Political advisory body in China

- Simplified Chinese: 中国人民政治协商会议全国委员会主席会议
- Traditional Chinese: 中國人民政治協商會議全國委員會主席會議
Transcriptions
Standard Mandarin
- Hanyu Pinyin: Zhōngguó Rénmín Zhèngzhì Xiéshāng Huìyì Quánguó Wěiyuánhuì Zhǔxí Huìyì

Chairperson's Council
- Simplified Chinese: 全国政协主席会议
- Traditional Chinese: 全國政協主席會議
Transcriptions
Standard Mandarin
- Hanyu Pinyin: Quánguó Zhèngxié Zhǔxí Huìyì

The Chairperson's Council of the National Committee of the Chinese People's Political Consultative Conference is a body which handles the daily affairs of the Standing Committee of the National Committee of the Chinese People's Political Consultative Conference, which is the national body of the Chinese People's Political Consultative Conference CPPCC), the top political advisory body of China. It is composed of the chairman, the vice chairpersons, and the secretary-general of the CPPCC National Committee. It holds more frequent meetings than the CPPCC National Committee.

== Functions ==
The Chairperson's Council consists of the chairman, the vice chairpersons, and the secretary-general of the CPPCC National Committee. It handles the day-to-day affairs of the Standing Committee and convinces its sessions on an average of at least one committee session per month, unlike the Standing Committee which holds its sessions bimonthy.
