= National Committee of the Chinese People's Political Consultative Conference =

Political advisory body in China

National Committee of the Chinese People's Political Consultative Conference 中国人民政治协商会议全国委员会
- 14th National Committee of the Chinese People's Political Consultative Conference
- Emblem of the Chinese People's Political Consultative Conference

Type
- Type: United front organ Constitutional convention (Historical); Legislature (Historical)

History
- Founded: 9 October 1949; 77 years ago
- Preceded by: National Assembly

Leadership
- Chairman: Wang Huning, CCP
- Vice Chairpersons: See list: Shi Taifeng, CCP; Hu Chunhua, CCP; Shen Yueyue, CCP; Wang Yong, CCP; Zhou Qiang, CCP; Pagbalha Geleg Namgyai, Nonpartisan; Edmund Ho, Nonpartisan; Leung Chun-ying, Nonpartisan; Bagatur, CCP; Su Hui, TDSL; Shao Hong, JS; Gao Yunlong, CDNCA; Chen Wu, CCP; Mu Hong, CCP; Xian Hui, CCP; Wang Dongfeng, CCP; Jiang Xinzhi, CCP; Jiang Zuojun, CZGP; He Baoxiang, RCCK; Wang Guangqian, CDL; Qin Boyong, CDNCA; Zhu Yongxin, CAPD; Yang Zhen, CPWDP
- Secretary-General: Wang Dongfeng, CCP
- Main Organ: Plenary Session & Standing Committee of the National Committee, CPPCC; Plenum of the CPPCC (Historical)

Structure
- Seats: 2169
- Political groups: CCP, democratic parties, and independents (544); People's organizations (313); Representatives of various groups (1076); Specially invited people (236)
- Length of term: 5 years

Meeting place
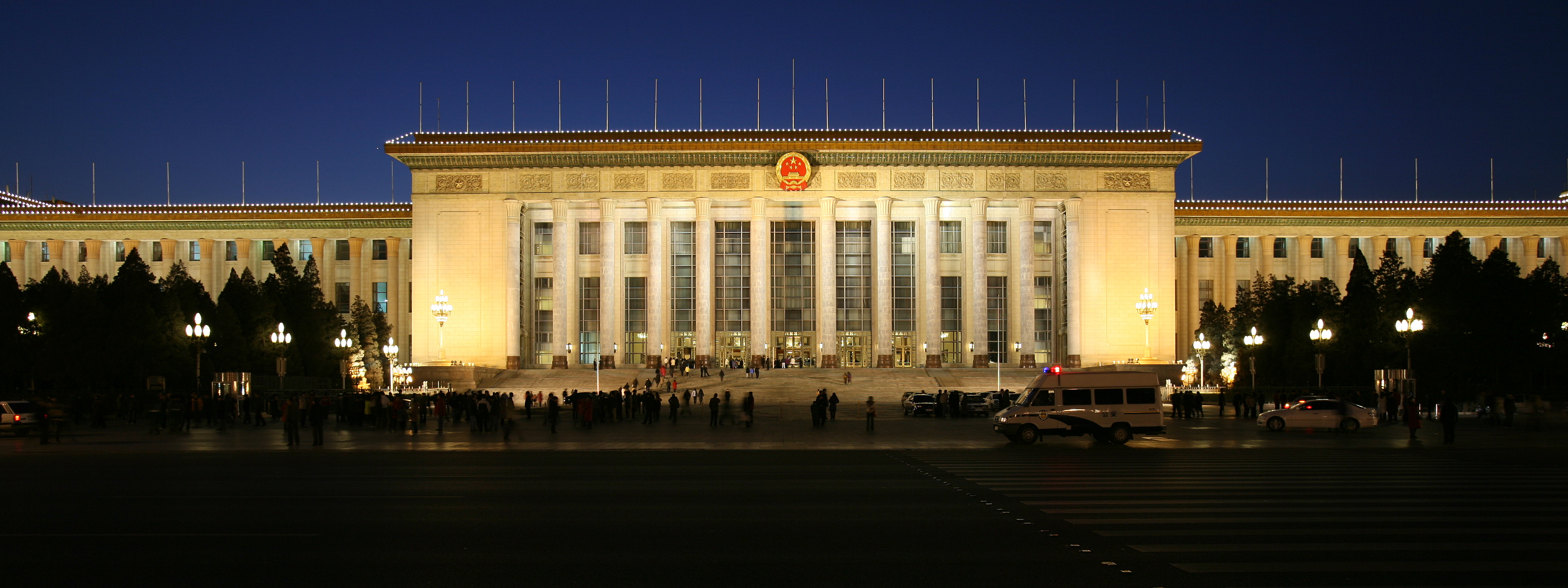
- Great Hall of the People, Xicheng District, Beijing City, People's Republic of China
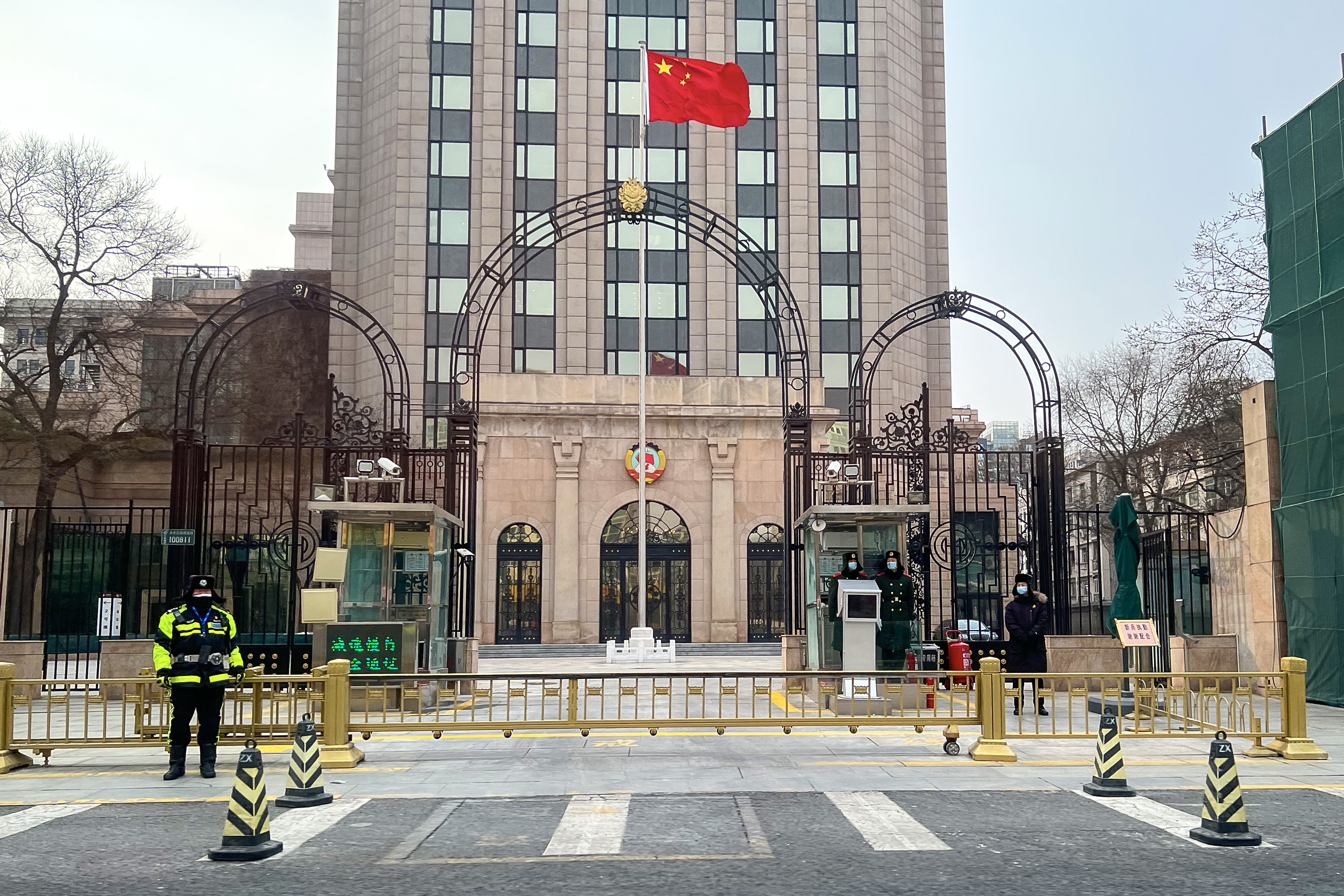
- Office Building, Xicheng District, Beijing City, People's Republic of China

Website
- www.cppcc.gov.cn

National Committee of the Chinese People's Political Consultative Conference
- Simplified Chinese: 中国人民政治协商会议全国委员会
- Traditional Chinese: 中國人民政治協商會議全國委員會
Transcriptions
Standard Mandarin
- Hanyu Pinyin: Zhōngguó Rénmín Zhèngzhì Xiéshāng Huìyì Quánguó Wěiyuánhuì

Short form
- Simplified Chinese: 政协全国委员会
- Traditional Chinese: 政協全國委員會
Transcriptions
Standard Mandarin
- Hanyu Pinyin: Zhèngxié Quánguó Wěiyuánhuì

Shortest form
- Simplified Chinese: 全国政协
- Traditional Chinese: 全國政協
Transcriptions
Standard Mandarin
- Hanyu Pinyin: Quánguó Zhèngxié

The National Committee of Chinese People's Political Consultative Conference is the national-level organization that represents the Chinese People's Political Consultative Conference (CPPCC), the political advisory body in the People's Republic of China.

The CPPCC National Committee is composed of a chairman, several vice chairpersons, a secretary-general and regular members. The National Committee of the CPPCC typically holds a yearly meeting at the same time as plenary sessions of the National People's Congress (NPC). The CPPCC National Committee and NPC plenary sessions are collectively called the Two Sessions. When the CPPCC National Committee is not in session, the Standing Committee of the National Committee exercises most of its powers on its behalf.

== History ==
The 1st Session of the 1st CPPCC National Committee was held on 9 October 1949.

On 30 August 1966, the CPPCC National Committee ceased operations due to the Cultural Revolution. On 28 February 1973, with the approval of Zhou Enlai, the CPPCC National held a "Symposium to Commemorate the 26th Anniversary of the February 28 Uprising of the Taiwanese People", marking the resumption of the CPPCC National Committee's activities.

== Organization ==
The National Committee is led by a chairman, currently Wang Huning, one of the highest-ranking offices in the country; since its establishment, all CPPCC chairpersons have been a member of the Politburo Standing Committee of the CCP except during transition periods, being at least its 4th-ranking member. The chairman is assisted by several vice chairpersons and a secretary-general, who heads the National Committee's General Office; together, they make up the Chairperson's Council, which handles the day-to-day affairs of the Standing Committee and convenes its sessions on an average of at least one committee session per month, unlike the SC-NPC which holds its sessions bimonthy. Council meetings coordinate work reports sent to the Standing Committee and the wider National Committee, review united front work, identify the issues to focus on during SC-NCCPPCC sessions and the annual general plenary, and highlight important ideological directions of the CCP. It also presides over the preparatory meeting of the first plenary session of the next National Committee.

The National Committee holds plenary sessions annually, though a session can be called by the National Committee's Standing Committee if necessary. The plenary sessions are generally held in March, around the same date as the annual session of the National People's Congress; together, these meetings are termed as the Two Sessions. During the Two Sessions, the CPPCC and the NPC hear and discuss reports from the premier, the prosecutor general, and the chief justice. Every CPPCC plenary session makes amendments to the CPPCC charter, elects on every first plenary session the Standing Committee, which handles the regular affairs of the body, and adopts resolutions on the National Committee's "major working principles and tasks". The Standing Committee is responsible for selecting deputies to the Conference, implementing the CPPCC's resolutions, and interpreting its official charter. According to the CPPCC charter, the relationship between the National Committee and the local committees is "one of guidance".

=== Membership ===
The National Committee is composed of deputies from various sectors of society. Deputies of the National Committee are elected for five-year terms, though this can be extended in exceptional circumstances by a two-thirds majority vote of all deputies of the Standing Committee.

The CCP and the aligned minor parties are assigned deputies in the National Committee. The Leading Party Members Group comprises the chairman and vice chairpersons who are CCP members, and is responsible for the implementation of the CCP Central Committee's policies. Besides political parties, the NC-CPPCC has also deputies from various sectors of society in its ranks. Members include scientists, academics, writers, artists, retired government officials, and entrepreneurs, among other sectors. The parties and groups with elected deputies to the NC-CPPCC are as follows:

National Committee of the Chinese People's Political Consultative Conference
| Political parties and independents | People's organizations | Sectoral representatives | Deputies with special status |
|---|---|---|---|
| Chinese Communist Party; Revolutionary Committee of the Chinese Kuomintang; China Democratic League; China National Democratic Construction Association; China Association for Promoting Democracy; Chinese Peasants' and Workers' Democratic Party; China Zhi Gong Party; Jiusan Society; Taiwan Democratic Self-Government League; Individuals without party affiliation | Communist Youth League of China and All-China Youth Federation; All-China Federation of Trade Unions; All-China Women's Federation; All-China Federation of Industry and Commerce; China Association for Science and Technology; All-China Federation of Taiwan Compatriots; All-China Federation of Returned Overseas Chinese | Sector of Literature and Arts; Sector of Science and Technology; Sector of Social Sciences; Sector of Economics; Sector of Agriculture; Sector of Education; Sector of Sports; Sector of Press and Publication; Sector of Medicine and Health; Sector of International Friendship Activists; Sector of Social Welfare and Social Security; Sector of Environment and Resources; Sector of the Ethnic Minorities; Sector of Religious Bodies | Specially Invited Hong Kong Representatives; Specially Invited Macao Representatives; Other Specially Invited Dignitaries to the Conference |

=== Standing Committee ===
The Standing Committee of the National Committee performs the duties of the CPPCC in between plenary sessions of the National Committee. It is responsible for all actions taken by the whole of the National Committee of the Conference or by individual deputies of it. According to the bylaw, the Chairman of the National Committee is Chairman of the Standing Committee ex officio.

=== Special Committees ===
The National Committee of the Chinese People's Political Consultative Conference contains several Special Committees, which are headed by the Standing Committee. The Special Committees typically have around sixty individual members, including a chairperson and ten or more vice-chairs. Like the main Conference, the Special Committees include a wide range of deputies from the relevant sectors forming its membership. The CPPCC National Committee currently has 10 Special Committees organized similarly to that of the Standing Committee:

1. Committee for Handling Proposals
2. Committee for Economic Affairs
3. Committee for Agriculture and Rural Affairs
4. Committee of Population, Resources and Environment
5. Committee of Education, Science, Culture, Health and Sports
6. Committee for Social and Legal Affairs
7. Committee for Ethnic and Religious Affairs
8. Committee for Liaison with Hong Kong, Macao, Taiwan and Overseas Chinese
9. Committee of Foreign Affairs
10. Committee on Culture, Historical Data and Studies

=== Publication ===
The CPPCC Daily is the official newspaper of the National Committee of the CPPCC.

=== Social organizations ===
The CPPCC National Committee has three national social organizations under its jurisdiction:

- China Economic and Social Council
- China Committee on Religion and Peace
- China Institute of Theory on the Chinese People's Political Consultative Conference
