= Leading Party Members Group of the Chinese People's Political Consultative Conference =

Organization of the Chinese Communist Party

Leading Party Members Group of the National Committee of the Chinese People's Political Consultative Conference
- 中国共产党中国人民政治协商会议全国委员会党组
- Formation: 1988
- Type: Party group
- Location: Beijing
- Leader: Wang Huning
- Deputy Leader: Shi Taifeng, Hu Chunhua
- Members: Shen Yueyue, Wang Yong, Zhou Qiang, Bagatur, Chen Wu, Mu Hong, Xian Hui, Wang Dongfeng, Jiang Xinzhi
- Parent organization: Central Committee of the Chinese Communist Party

Leading Party Members Group of the Chinese People's Political Consultative Conference
- Simplified Chinese: 中国共产党中国人民政治协商会议全国委员会党组
Transcriptions
Standard Mandarin
- Hanyu Pinyin: Zhōngguó Gòngchǎndǎng Zhōngguó Rénmín Zhèngzhì Xiéshāng Huìyì Guánguó Wěiyuánhuì Dǎngzǔ

The Leading Party Members Group of the National Committee of the Chinese People's Political Consultative Conference is a party group set up under the Central Committee of the Chinese Communist Party in the National Committee of the Chinese People's Political Consultative Conference (CPPCC).

== History ==
The Leading Party Members Group of the National Committee of the CPPCC was established in the 7th National Committee of the Chinese People's Political Consultative Conference in 1988, and has been established in every subsequent National Committee.

== Functions ==
The Party Group is responsible for overseeing the implementation of CCP Central Committee policies in the CPPCC. It also oversees the revising the Charter of the CPPCC together with the CCP Central Committee. A Politburo meeting in October 2017 after the first plenary session of the 19th CCP Central Committee stipulated that the Leading Party Members Group must report its work to the Politburo and its Standing Committee every year.
