= Office Building of the National Committee of the Chinese People's Political Consultative Conference =

Chinese government facility

- 中国人民政治协商会议全国委员会办公楼
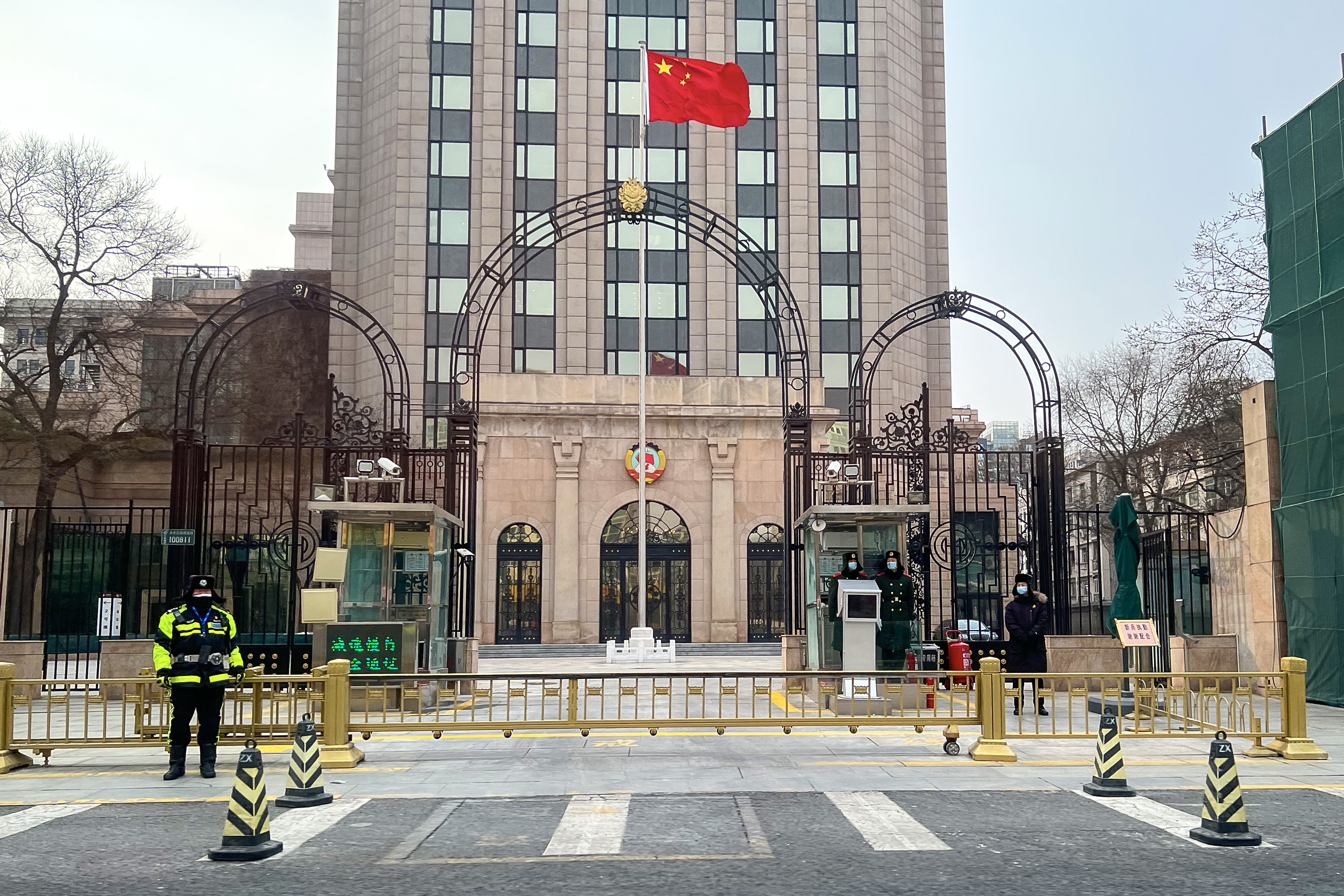
- The North Gate of the Office Building of the National Committee of the CPPCC

General information
- Location: No 23 Taipingqiao Street; Xicheng, Beijing, China

The Office Building of the National Committee of the Chinese People's Political Consultative Conference is located at No. 23 Taipingqiao Street, Xicheng District, Beijing. It is the office building of the National Committee of the CPPCC and the venue for meetings, receptions and other activities.

== History ==
The CPPCC Office Building was built by demolishing the original office address of the CPPCC, which was the Shuncheng Prince's Mansion in the Qing Dynasty. The original office address was located on the north side of the CPPCC Auditorium. The Jinshifang Primary School to the southwest, the Cultural Restaurant, and the dormitory to the north were all the former sites of the Shuncheng Prince's Mansion. The Shuncheng Prince's Mansion was renovated when Zhang Zuolin purchased it as a residence during the mainland period of the Republic of China, and was later renovated and rebuilt. Before the construction of the CPPCC Office Building, the old site of the Prince's Mansion had completely changed compared to the "Qianlong Capital Map" in 1750.

Since its establishment, the CPPCC has been working at the old site of Shuncheng Prince's Mansion for more than 40 years, and the working conditions are difficult. The relevant government departments decided to move the old site of Shuncheng Prince's Mansion to Chaoyang Park for reconstruction to solve the land use problem of the CPPCC office building. The new CPPCC office building covers an area of about 12,380 square meters and a building area of about 40,000 square meters. In July 1993, the Architectural Design Institute of the Ministry of Construction cooperated with the owner to establish the project and plan the functional rooms and began the preliminary design work. In mid-December 1993, it obtained the project approval notice from the State Planning Commission and submitted the design plan on December 31. After several rounds of adjustments, in early March 1994, when the relevant departments had roughly agreed to the revised plan, the Architectural Design Institute of the Ministry of Construction provided the basic trench outline drawings and started construction first. The preliminary design was completed in April 1994 (the construction of the main building pile foundation and the basement waterproofing had been completed at that time), the basic construction drawings were completed in mid-August (the construction had reached the fifth floor of the main building at that time), and the interior decoration plan design and review and modification were completed. At the end of September 1995, the CPPCC office building was completed, and in early October, the 14th meeting of the 8th CPPCC Standing Committee was held in the newly built Standing Committee Meeting Hall.

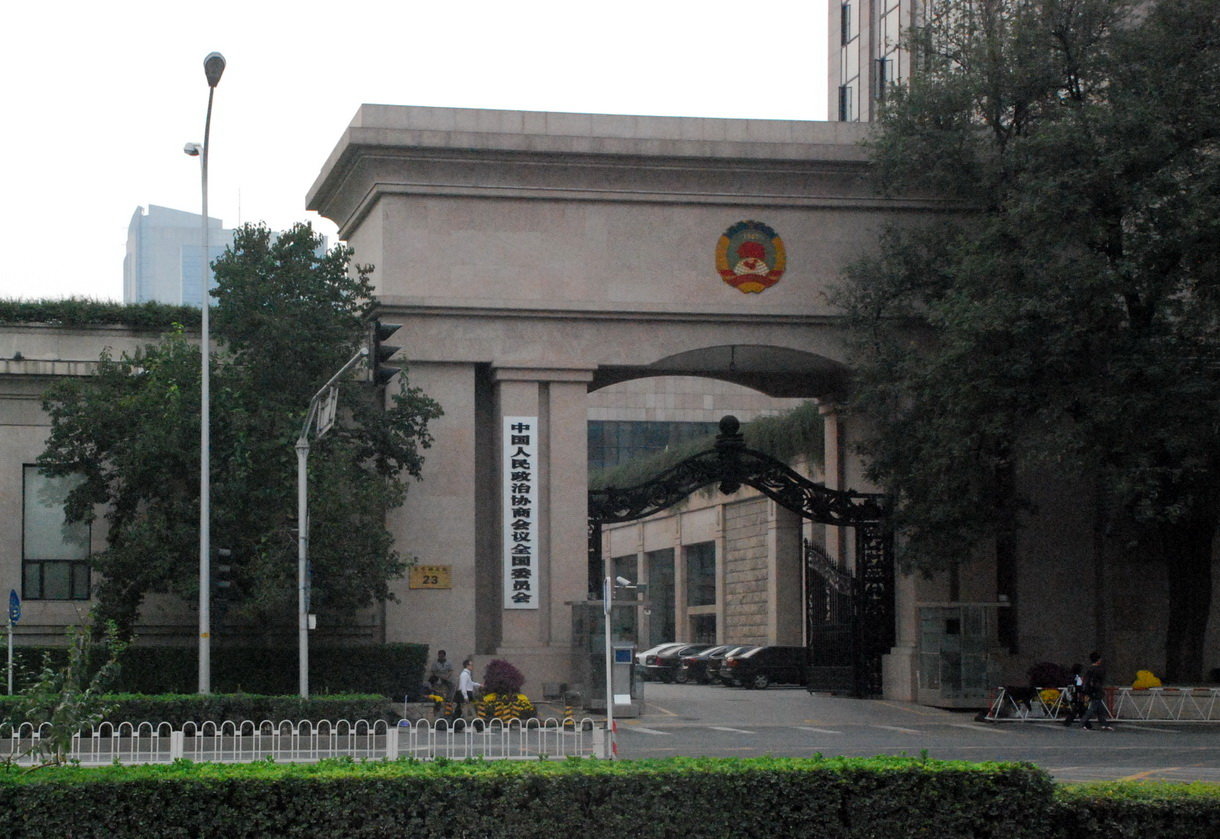
The gate outside the CPPCC office building at No. 23 Taipingqiao Street

The total construction area of the CPPCC office building is 45,000 square meters, with 2 underground floors and 14 above-ground floors, with a total height of 52 meters. The above-ground buildings are composed of five parts: the Standing Committee Meeting Building, the Group Meeting Building, the Chief Office Building, the Executive Office Building, and the Multifunctional Garden Plaza. The Garden Plaza connects the four independent buildings into an organic whole, with functions such as office, meeting, reception, fitness, rest, and entertainment. The foundation of the project adopts large-diameter artificially excavated and expanded bottom cast-in-place piles and local raft foundations. The main body is a fully cast-in-place reinforced concrete frame shear wall structure. The floor slab adopts an unbonded prestressed post-tensioned structural system. The 32-meter-long span roof adopts a bolt ball node steel grid structure. The exterior decoration is all rust stone granite and black aluminum alloy frame glass curtain wall. The new building is coordinated and unified with the original CPPCC auditorium. In the design, 10 ancient trees within the site were retained and the ancient trees were divided into three outdoor gardens. The buildings were arranged in a triangular shape, and the gardens were surrounded by buildings.

The design of the CPPCC National Committee Office Building won the Lu Ban Award in 1996, the First Prize for Excellent Architectural Design of Directly Managed Units of the Ministry of Construction in 1998, and the Excellent Work Award of the Architectural Creation Award of the Architectural Society of China in 1996.
