= Emblem of the Chinese People's Political Consultative Conference =

- Armiger: Chinese People's Political Consultative Conference
- Adopted: 21 September 1949

Emblem of the Chinese People's Political Consultative Conference
- Simplified Chinese: 中国人民政治协商会议会徽
- Traditional Chinese: 中國人民政治協商會議會徽
Transcriptions
Standard Mandarin
- Hanyu Pinyin: Zhōngguó Rénmín Zhèngzhì Xiéshāng Huìyì Huìhuī

The emblem of the Chinese People's Political Consultative Conference is the symbol of the Chinese People's Political Consultative Conference. It features a red five-pointed star at the top, and a red map of China with the Nine-dash line set against a white globe in the center, surrounded by golden ears of wheat and a blue gear connected by a red ribbon. It was adopted for the first time at the first plenary session of the Chinese People's Political Consultative Conference on 21 September 1949.

== History ==
In July 1949, the fifth working meeting of the secretary-general's office of the Preparatory Committee for the New Political Consultative Conference decided to formulate the emblem of the Chinese People's Political Consultative Conference. The design by Zhang Ding and Zhou Lingzhao was selected from a large number of designs. After instructions from Zhou Enlai, the design was circulated to the members of the Standing Committee of the Preparatory Committee and was formulated and approved by the Preparatory Committee in July 1949. With the approval of Mao Zedong, the chairman of the Standing Committee of the Preparatory Committee, it was officially used for the first time at the first plenary session of the Chinese People's Political Consultative Conference, which opened on 21 September 1949.

There was no rigid regulation for the CPPCC emblem for a long time, and the pattern and color also changed frequently. At the end of 1963, the People's Daily quoted a reader's statement that the map in the CPPCC emblem was inconsistent with the map of China at that time; thereafter, the CPPCC Secretariat invited the State Bureau of Surveying and Mapping and the China Cartographic Publishing House to propose a new pattern to re-design the emblem, and in August 1965, it issued a notice to all committees across the country to follow this standard. In January 1981, the General Office of the National Committee of the Chinese People's Political Consultative Conference issued the "Regulations of the National Committee of the Chinese People's Political Consultative Conference on the Standards of the Emblem, Signboard and Seal of Local Committees at or Above the County Level", which once again determined the emblem and its replica pattern.

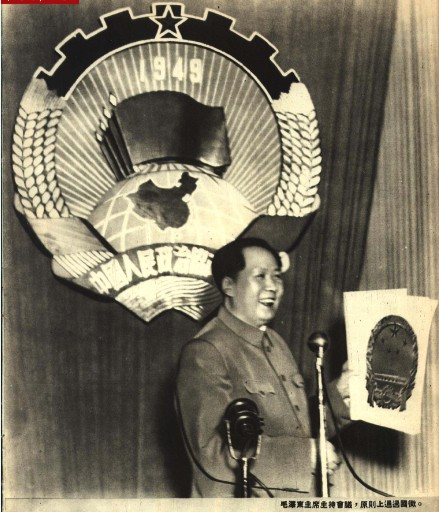
Mao Zedong displaying the national emblem of the People's Republic of China in front of the CPPCC emblem during the second session of the CPPCC National Committee in 1950.

In December 2011, the General Office issued the "Notice on Standardizing the Use of the Emblem of the Chinese People's Political Consultative Conference" and issued the "CPPCC Emblem Pattern" with the notice. The "CPPCC Emblem Pattern" issued this time clarified the specific color value of the emblem for the first time. In 2017, according to the arrangement of the General Office, Hang Hai, a teacher at the Central Academy of Fine Arts, undertook the design work of the artistic improvement and application specification of the CPPCC emblem, and referred to Zhou Lingzhao's opinions during the revision of the emblem. In June 2018, the General Office issued the Regulations on the Production and Use of the CPPCC Emblem. Its annex "Emblem Production Regulations" clarified the color, form of expression, use of monochrome, and special process printing of the emblem pattern, and proposed for the first time the technical standards for the three-dimensional production of the emblem.

== Design ==
The emblem of the Chinese People's Political Consultative Conference has a red five-pointed star at the top, and a red map of China set against a white globe in the center, surrounded by golden ears of wheat and a blue gear connected by a red ribbon. The emblem of the CPPCC embodies the spirit of "the great unity of all democratic classes under the leadership of the proletariat and based on the worker-peasant alliance".

The original description of the design by the designer was: "First, the red star represents the leadership of the proletariat; second, the gear and the golden harvest represent the worker-peasant alliance as the basis; third, the four red flags represent the great unity of the four classes (i.e., the working class, the peasant class, the petty bourgeoisie, and the national bourgeoisie); fourth, the map represents the new China, and the background is radiant." The four numerals "1949" under the red star represent the year in which the Chinese People's Political Consultative Conference was born; the 10 golden Song-style characters "Chinese People's Political Consultative Conference" on the ribbon indicate the full name of the CPPCC.

On 15 March 2018, the first session of the 13th National Committee of the Chinese People's Political Consultative Conference adopted the Amendment to the Charter of the Chinese People's Political Consultative Conference. The revised Constitution of the CPPCC added Chapter VI, "Emblem":

Chapter Six: Emblem

Article 61: The emblem of the Chinese People's Political Consultative Conference is a pattern composed of a five-pointed star, a gear and ears of wheat, four red flags and ribbons, a map of China and the Earth, the year "1949" and the words "Chinese People's Political Consultative Conference".

Article 62: In the emblem of the Chinese People's Political Consultative Conference (CPPCC), a five-pointed star represents the leadership of the Chinese Communist Party; the gear and ears of wheat represent the worker-peasant alliance as the foundation; the four red flags and ribbons represent the great unity and alliance of all political parties, groups, nationalities, and social strata; the map of China and the globe represent the unity of all the people of China, including compatriots in the Hong Kong Special Administrative Region, the Macao Special Administrative Region, Taiwan, and overseas Chinese; "1949" and "Chinese People's Political Consultative Conference" are the year of its founding and its name, respectively.

Article 63: All participating units and individuals of the Chinese People's Political Consultative Conference shall uphold the dignity of the emblem. The emblem shall be made and used in accordance with regulations.

== See also ==
- National emblem of China
- Emblem and flag of the Chinese Communist Party
