= Standing Committee of the National Committee of the Chinese People's Political Consultative Conference =

Chinese governmental organization

Standing Committee of the National Committee of the Chinese People's Political Consultative Conference 中国人民政治协商会议 全国委员会常务委员会
- Standing Committee of the 14th National Committee of the Chinese People's Political Consultative Conference
- Emblem of the Chinese People's Political Consultative Conference

Type
- Type: Permanent body of the National Committee of the Chinese People's Political Consultative Conference

History
- Founded: 1949; 77 years ago

Leadership
- Chairman: Wang Huning, CCP
- Vice Chairpersons: See list: Shi Taifeng, CCP; Hu Chunhua, CCP; Shen Yueyue, CCP; Wang Yong, CCP; Zhou Qiang, CCP; Pagbalha Geleg Namgyai, Nonpartisan; Edmund Ho, Nonpartisan; Leung Chun-ying, Nonpartisan; Bagatur, CCP; Su Hui, TDSL; Shao Hong, JS; Gao Yunlong, CDNCA; Chen Wu, CCP; Mu Hong, CCP; Xian Hui, CCP; Wang Dongfeng, CCP; Jiang Xinzhi, CCP; Jiang Zuojun, CZGP; He Baoxiang, RCCK; Wang Guangqian, CDL; Qin Boyong, CDNCA; Zhu Yongxin, CAPD; Yang Zhen, CPWDP
- Secretary-General: Wang Dongfeng, CCP

Structure
- Seats: 324
- Political groups: CCP, minor parties, and independents (193); People's organizations (30); Representatives of various groups (67); Specially invited people (33); Vacant (1)
- Length of term: 5 years

Meeting place
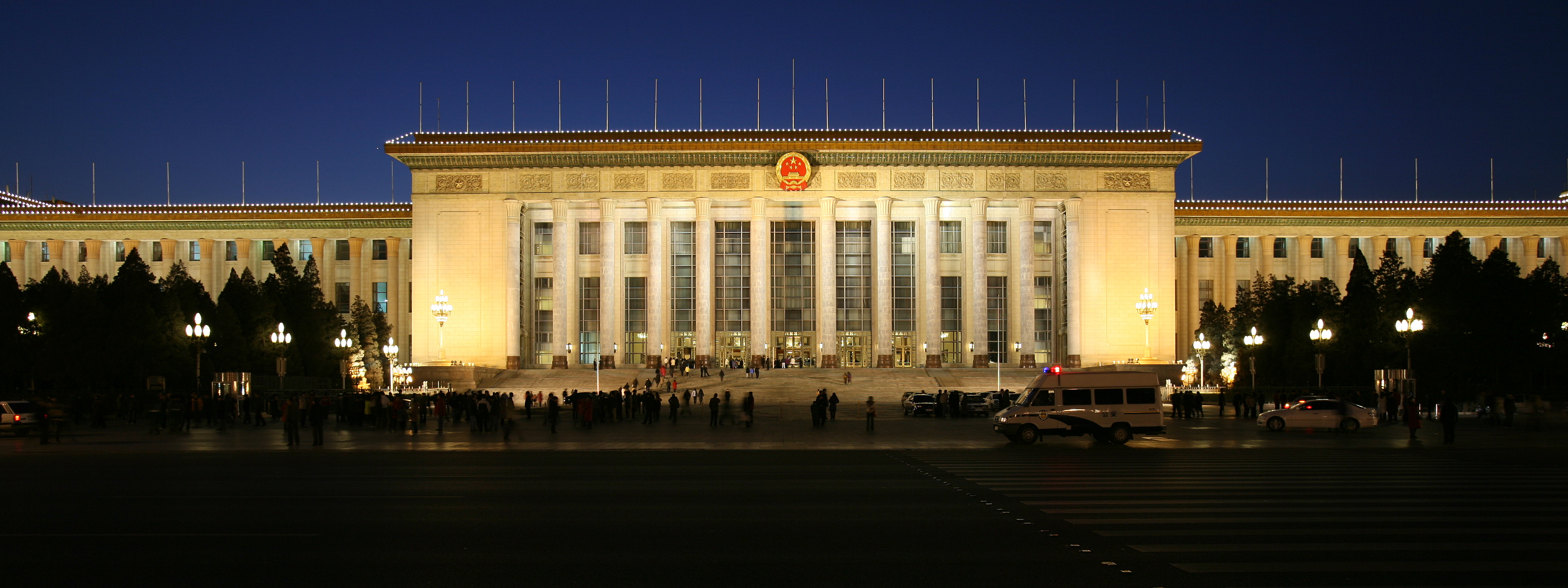
- Great Hall of the People, Xicheng District, Beijing City, People's Republic of China
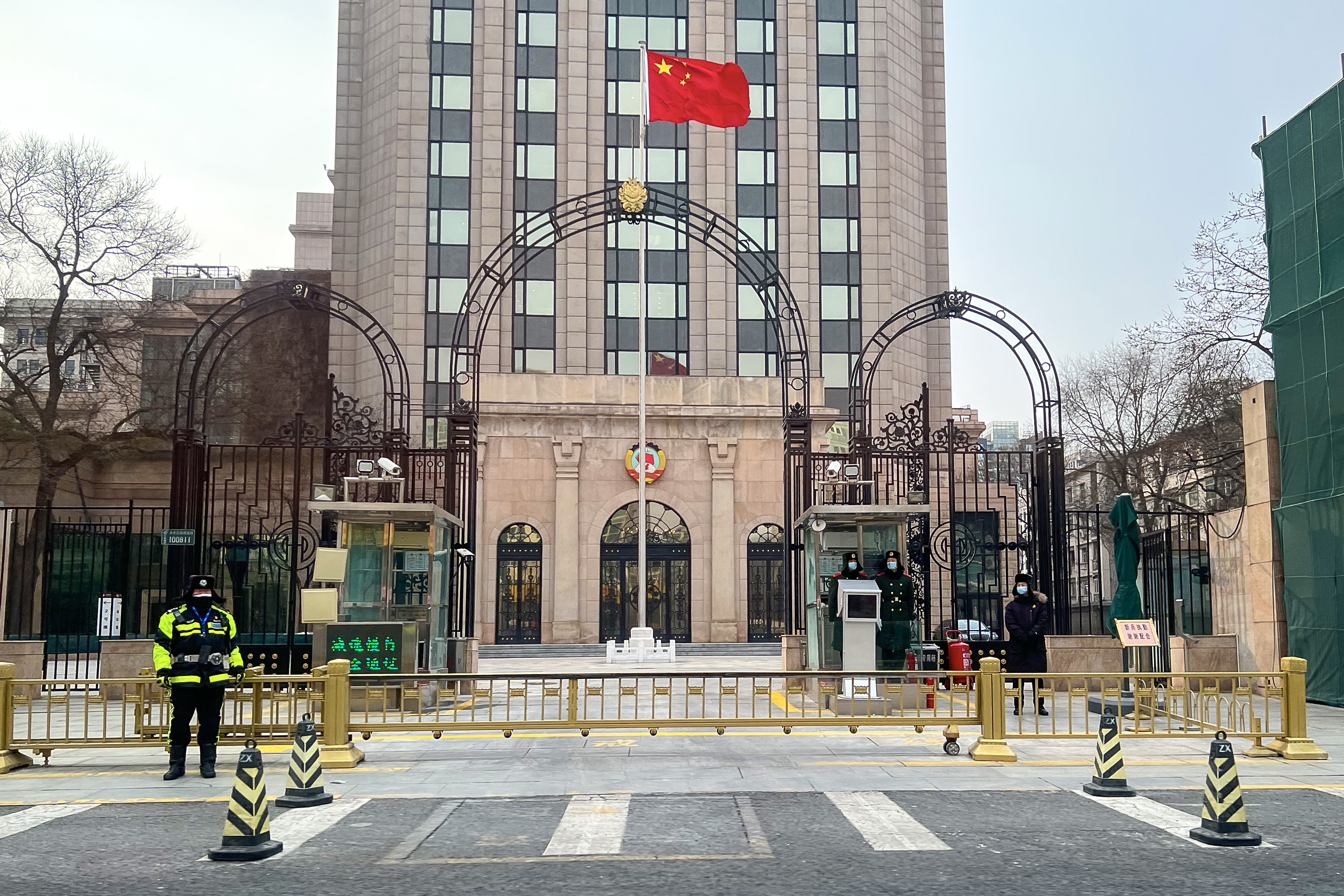
- Office Building, Xicheng District, Beijing City, People's Republic of China

Standing Committee of the National Committee of the Chinese People's Political Consultative Conference
- Simplified Chinese: 中国人民政治协商会议全国委员会常务委员会
- Traditional Chinese: 中國人民政治協商會議全國委員會常務委員會
Transcriptions
Standard Mandarin
- Hanyu Pinyin: Zhōngguó Rénmín Zhèngzhì Xiéshāng Huìyì Quánguó Wěiyuánhuì Chángwù wěiyuánhuì

Short form
- Simplified Chinese: 全国政协常委会
- Traditional Chinese: 政協全國委員會
Transcriptions
Standard Mandarin
- Hanyu Pinyin: Quánguó Zhèngxié Chángwěihuì

The Standing Committee of the National Committee of the Chinese People's Political Consultative Conference is the permanent body of the National Committee of the Chinese People's Political Consultative Conference (CPPCC), the top political advisory body of the People's Republic of China. It exercises the powers of the CPPCC National Committee when it is not in session.

The Standing Committee of the National Committee is composed of a chairman, vice chairpersons, a secretary-general, and regular members, all of whom are elected by regular CPPCC National Committee sessions. It holds sessions every two to three months, The day-to-day operations of the Standing Committee are handled by the Chairperson's Council, which is composed of the chairman, vice chairpersons, and the secretary-general.

== Organization ==
The Standing Committee performs the duties of the CPPCC in between plenary sessions of the National Committee. It is composed of a chairman, vice chairpersons, a secretary-general, and regular members, all of whom are elected by regular CPPCC National Committee sessions. It is responsible for all actions taken by the whole of the National Committee of the Conference or by individual deputies of it. According to the bylaw, the Chairman of the National Committee is Chairman of the Standing Committee ex officio. The Standing Committee is responsible for selecting deputies to the Conference, implementing the CPPCC's resolutions, and interpreting its official charter. The Chairperson's Council handles the day-to-day affairs of the Standing Committee and convences its sessions on an average of at least one committee session per month, unlike the Standing Committee of the National People's Congress, which holds its sessions every two to three months.
