= General Office of the National Committee of the Chinese People's Political Consultative Conference =

Administrative agency of the National Committee of the CPPCC

- 中国人民政治协商会议全国委员会 办公厅
- Formation: December 30, 1980
- Type: Administrative agency of the National Committee of the Chinese People's Political Consultative Conference
- Location: No. 23 Taipingqiao Street, Xicheng, Beijing
- Secretary-General: Wang Dongfeng
- Executive Deputy Secretary-General: Zou Jiayi
- Deputy Secretaries-General: Li Huidong, Han Jianhua, Hu Henglu, Zhang Maoyu, Chen Xu, Wu Weishan, Sun Dongsheng, He Zhimin, Wang Lu, Zhang Endi, Liu Zhengkui, Jiang Liping, Han Dongmei
- Parent organization: National Committee of the Chinese People's Political Consultative Conference

Chinese name
- Simplified Chinese: 中国人民政治协商会议全国委员会办公厅[编辑源代码]
- Traditional Chinese: 中國人民政治協商會議全國委員會辦公室
Transcriptions
Standard Mandarin
- Hanyu Pinyin: Zhōngguó Rénmín Zhèngzhì Xiéshāng Huìyì Quánguó Wěiyuánhuì Bàngōngtīng

Abbreviation
- Simplified Chinese: 全国政协办公厅
- Traditional Chinese: 全國政協辦公廳
Transcriptions
Standard Mandarin
- Hanyu Pinyin: Quánguó Zhèngxié Bàngōngtīng

The General Office of the National Committee of the Chinese People's Political Consultative Conference is an administrative agency of the National Committee of the Chinese People's Political Consultative Conference (CPPCC), which assists the CPPCC National Committee with the day to day administrative operations. The General Office was established in 1980. It is headed by the Secretary-General of the CPPCC.

== History ==
The predecessor of the General Office was the Secretariat of the CPPCC National Committee, which was established in October 1949. The General Office of the CPPCC Standing Committee was established on 30 December 1980.

== Functions ==
The General Office is the administrative agency of the CPPCC National Committee. It is headed by the secretary-general, who is assisted by deputy secretaries-general.

== Organization ==
The General Office is composed of the following departments:

- Research Office (deputy ministerial-level)
  - Theoretical Bureau of the Research Office (deputy bureau-level)
  - Information Bureau of the Research Office (deputy bureau-level)
  - Office of the Research Office (director-level)
- Secretariat
- Office of the Committee for Handling Proposals (first bureau)
- Office of the Committee for Economic Affairs (second bureau)
- Office of the Committee of Population, Resources and Environment (third bureau)
- Office of the Committee of Education, Science, Culture, Health and Sports (fourth bureau)
- Office of the Committee for Social and Legal Affairs (fifth bureau)
- Office of the Committee for Ethnic and Religious Affairs (sixth bureau)
- Office of the Committee for Liaison with Hong Kong, Macao, Taiwan and Overseas Chinese (seventh bureau)
- Office of the Committee of Foreign Affairs (Foreign Affairs Bureau of the General Office, eighth bureau)
- Office of the Committee on Culture, Historical Data and Studies (ninth bureau)
- Liaison Bureau (Letters and Calls Bureau)
- Personnel Bureau
- Veteran Affairs Bureau
- Information Bureau
- Office Affairs Bureau
- Party Committee

The General Office also manages the following directly affiliated institutions:

- CPPCC Cadre Training Center (CPPCC Beidaihe Administration Bureau)
- People's Political Consultative Conference Newspaper
- CPPCC Auditorium
- Information Center of the General Office of the CPPCC National Committee
- Education and Career Magazine
- Huangpu Magazine
- China Political Consultative Conference Magazine
- Chinese People's Political Consultative Conference Museum of Literature and History
