= China Youth University of Political Studies =

University in Beijing, China

- 中国青年政治学院
- Former name: China Youth College for Political Sciences
- Motto: 实事求是 朝气蓬勃 (Seek truth from facts and remain vigorous in practice)
- Type: Public
- Established: 1948; 78 years ago
- President: Qin Yizhi
- Location: Beijing, China; 39°56′58″N 116°18′05″E
- Campus: Urban
- Website: www.cyu.edu.cn

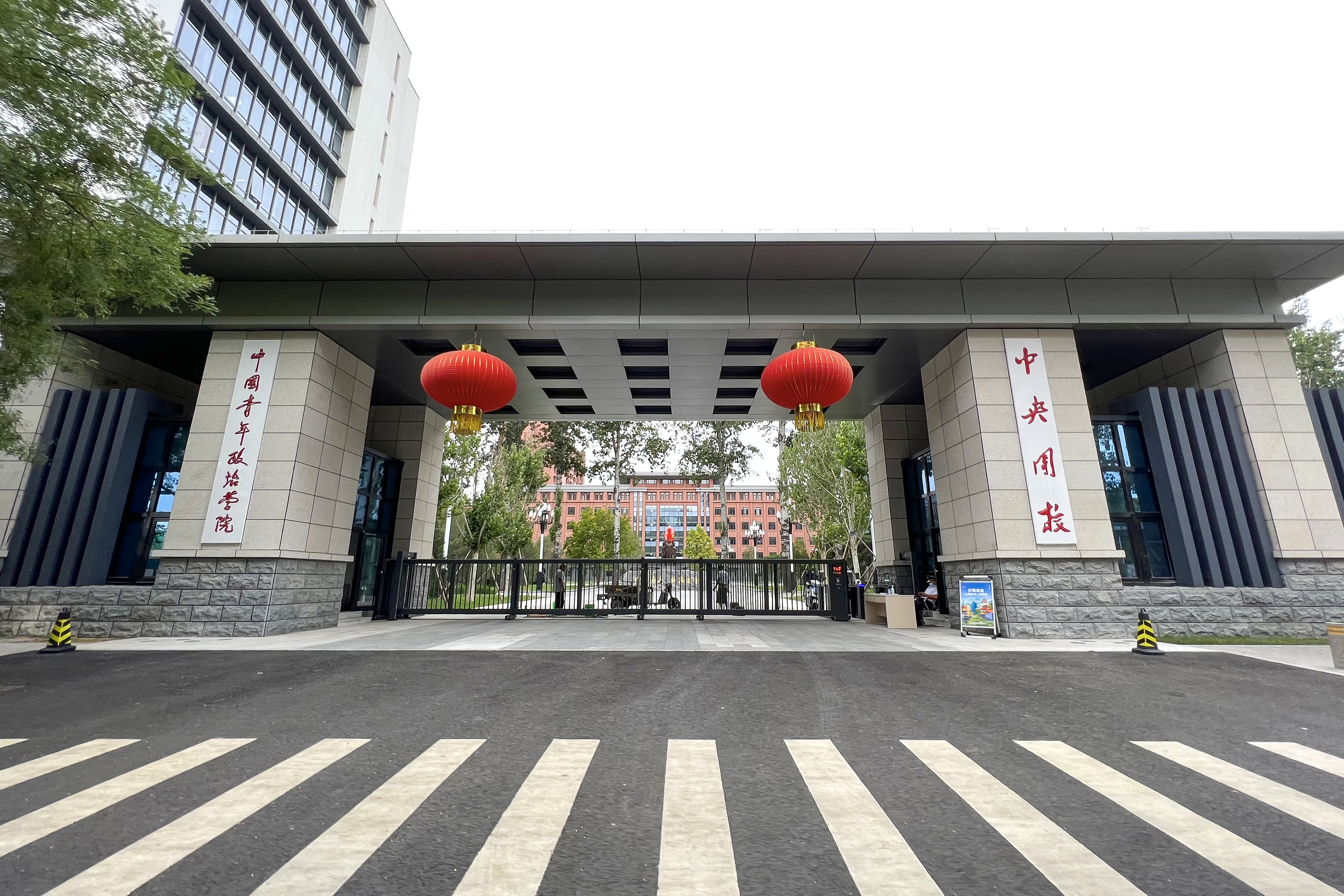
Main gate of the school. The sign on the right is for the "Central League School", and the sign on the left is for the university, an arrangement known in China as "one institution with two names".

China Youth University of Political Studies (Chinese: 中国青年政治学院; pinyin: Zhōngguó Qīngnián Zhèngzhì Xuéyuàn) is a university in Beijing, established in 1985 by the Communist Youth League of China. Since then the university has been affiliated with the league, and the First Secretary of the league usually holds the presidency of the university. Hu Jintao, the General Secretary of the Chinese Communist Party and paramount leader of China, was once the president of this university. The university's 12-hectare (30-acre) campus is located in Xisanhuan Bei Lu (West 3rd Ring Northern Road) in Beijing. The China Youth University of Political Studies ceased operation as a public university in 2017. It is now a co-brand used by the Central School of the Communist Youth League of China (Chinese: 中央团校; pinyin: Zhōngyāng Tuán Xiào), a training school run by the Communist Youth League.

== History ==
The university grew from the Central School of the Communist Youth League of China which was founded in 1948, and was a political training school serving the Communist Youth League. In 1985, as part of political reforms under the reformist administration of Hu Yaobang to convert party organs into public institutions under a public administrative structure, the Youth League School was converted to a public university, under the name of the China Youth University of Political Studies. The university began enrolling undergraduate students in 1986.

However, as part of the counter-reform measures implemented by the general secretaryship of Xi Jinping to convert public institutions back into party organs, in 2017-2018 the China Youth University of Political Studies was moved back into the control of the Communist Youth League. Its undergraduate school was merged into the University of Chinese Academy of Social Sciences. The establishment of the Central School of the Communist Youth League of China was revived under the control of the Communist Youth League, although the school will continue to be co-branded as the China Youth University of Political Studies.

== Colleges and majors ==
The university is a major law and politics institute in China doing research on Marxism, Public Administration, Youth Culture and Youth Development, Social Work, Criminal Law, and Journalism. The first youth work department in China was founded in this university in 1985. The university also has the first and largest social work department (now a social work college) in mainland China.

The university provides post-graduate education in such fields as Marxism, Sociology, Criminal Law, Economic Law, Journalism, and Economics.

Until 2017, China Youth University of Political Studies focused on undergraduate education. The university had undergraduate majors such as Economics, Law, Journalism and Mass Communication, Social Work, Sociology, Social Security, Youth Work, Public Administration, Chinese Language and Literature, and Foreign Languages and Literature.

== Facilities ==
In 2013, the CYU library became a branch of the National Library of China.

== List of presidents ==
The office of the President of the CYUPL is held by the First Secretary of the Communist Youth League.

- Hu Yaobang: 1957–78
- Han Ying (韩英, Hán Yīng): 1978–82
- Wang Zhaoguo: 1982–84
- Hu Jintao: 1984–85
- Song Defu: 1985–93
- Li Keqiang: 1993–98
- Zhou Qiang: 1998–2006
- Hu Chunhua: 2006–08
- Lu Hao: 2008–13
- Qin Yizhi: 2013–
