= He Junke =

Chinese politician

- 贺军科
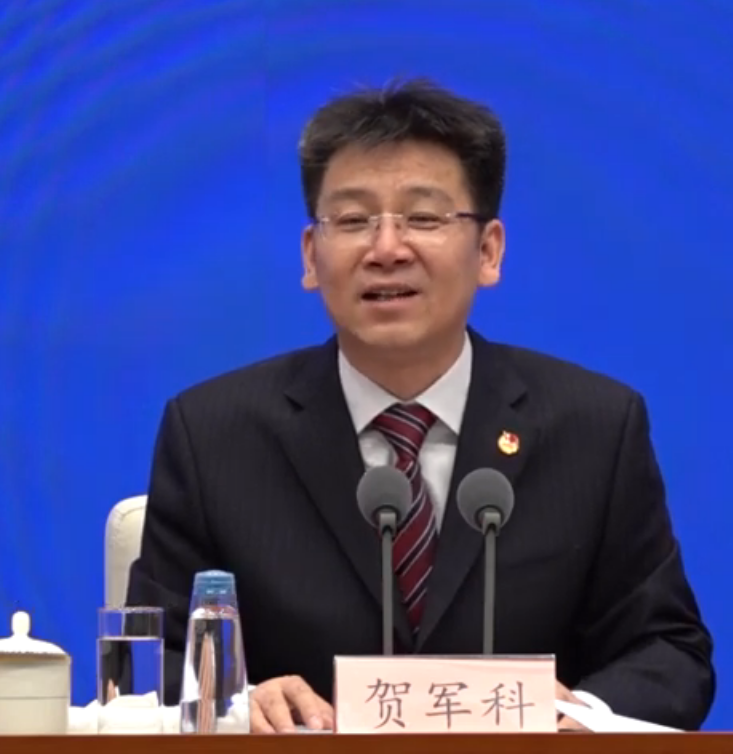
- He in April 2022

Party Branch Secretary of the China Association for Science and Technology
- Incumbent
- Assumed office 30 May 2023
- President: Wan Gang
- Preceded by: Zhang Yuzhuo

First Secretary of the Communist Youth League of China
- In office 29 June 2018 – 31 May 2023
- Preceded by: Qin Yizhi
- Succeeded by: A Dong

Director of the National Working Committee of the Young Pioneers of China
- In office 26 July 2021 – 31 May 2023
- Preceded by: Wu Gang
- Succeeded by: A Dong

Personal details
- Born: February 1969 (age 57) Fengxiang County, Shaanxi, China
- Party: Chinese Communist Party
- Education: National University of Defense Technology; Beihang University

Chinese name
- Simplified Chinese: 贺军科
- Traditional Chinese: 賀軍科
Transcriptions
Standard Mandarin
- Hanyu Pinyin: Hè Jūnkē

He Junke (Chinese: 贺军科; born February 1969) is a Chinese executive and politician, currently serving as party branch secretary of the China Association for Science and Technology since May 2023. He previously served as first secretary of the Communist Youth League of China and director of the National Working Committee of the Young Pioneers of China.

He was a representative of the 19th National Congress of the Chinese Communist Party and was an alternate of the 19th Central Committee of the Chinese Communist Party. He is a representative of the 20th National Congress of the Chinese Communist Party and a member of the 20th Central Committee of the Chinese Communist Party.

== Early life and education ==
He was born in Fengxiang County (now Fengxiang District), Shaanxi, in February 1969. In 1987, he entered National University of Defense Technology, where he majored in liquid rocket engine. He also received a master of engineering degree from Beihang University in December 2003.

== Enterprise career ==
After university in 1991, He was assigned to the Ministry of Aerospace Industry, which was reshuffled as China Aerospace Industry Corporation in 1996. He joined the Chinese Communist Party (CCP) in June 1995.

In June 2000, he became assistant to the president of the 6th Research Institute of China Aerospace Mechanical and Electrical Corporation, rising to president two years later.

== Political career ==
In December 2005, He was appointed first secretary of the Communist Youth League of China, in addition to serving as vice president of the All-China Youth Federation. He was promoted to become executive secretary of the Secretariat of the Central Committee of the Communist Youth League of China in June 2013 and president of the All-China Youth Federation in September 2013. He was promoted again to first secretary of the Secretariat of the Central Committee of the Communist Youth League of China in June 2018, concurrently serving as director of the National Working Committee of the Young Pioneers of China.

In May 2023, He was appointed as party branch secretary of the China Association for Science and Technology.

Civic offices
Preceded by Wang Xiao	President of the All-China Youth Federation; 2013–2018	Succeeded by Wang Hongyan
Party political offices
Preceded by Qin Yizhi	First Secretary of the Communist Youth League of China; 2018–2023	Succeeded by A Dong
Preceded by Wu Gang	Director of the National Working Committee of the Young Pioneers of China; 2021–2023	Succeeded by A Dong
Preceded by Zhang Yuzhuo	Party Branch Secretary of the China Association for Science and Technology; 2023–present	Incumbent
