= Tuanpai =

Faction of the Chinese Communist Party

Tuanpai 团派
- Leader: Hu Yaobang; Hu Jintao
- Members: Li Keqiang; Li Yuanchao; Wang Yang; Hu Chunhua; Liu Yandong; Zhou Qiang
- Founder: Hu Yaobang
- Headquarters: Beijing
- Ideology: Socialism with Chinese characteristics: Scientific Outlook on Development; Scientific socialism; Environmentalism; Welfarism

Tuanpai
- Simplified Chinese: 团派
- Traditional Chinese: 團派
- Literal meaning: League faction
Transcriptions
Standard Mandarin
- Hanyu Pinyin: Tuánpài

The Tuanpai, or Youth League Faction, is a term used by political observers and analysts to describe an informal political faction in the Chinese Communist Party (CCP), which includes cadres and government officials who originated from the Communist Youth League.

There have been two "Youth League factions" in recent memory, without direct political lineage between each other. The first, which emerged in the 1980s, comprised cadres of Youth League background who supported CCP general secretary Hu Yaobang: the term "Tuanpai" was originally used to criticise Hu Yaobang for alleged over-reliance on cadres of Youth League background. The second, from the 2000s, comprised CCP general secretary Hu Jintao and his group of populist associates and other political allies. The influence of the faction weakened greatly under CCP general secretary Xi Jinping. As of 2022, there is little evidence that the group still exists.

== Characteristics ==
Hu Jintao became the general secretary of the Chinese Communist Party in 2002. Hu Jintao also has a background in the Communist Youth League (though he is of a younger generation than Hu Yaobang's Youth League colleagues). Hu's rise to power roused interest in members of the party leadership who, like him, had a background in the Youth League. Hu Jintao is himself sometimes counted as a member of the first Youth League faction, as he was promoted to head the Youth League under Hu Yaobang's leadership. However, the younger Hu's subsequent rise to power owed more to the patronage of Deng Xiaoping and other party elders than that of the elder Hu. As a result, there is no direct political lineage between the two Youth League factions.

Political analyst Cheng Li of Brookings Institution divides the contemporary CCP power structure into two distinct "coalitions" - one of "Populists" and the other of "Elitists". Elitists are classified as those who originate mostly in China's rich coastal provinces, notably Shanghai, or those who have a family background of high-ranking Communist Party officials (i.e. the Princelings). The Youth League faction, on the other hand, belongs to the "Populist" faction, consisting of officials who have relatively humble backgrounds and who have climbed through the power structure from the grassroots. While the Elitists were more concerned with economic growth and market functionality, the Populists were more focused on societal harmony and decreasing inequality, Li explains. He places the Youth League faction at the core of the Populist coalition.

Observers have said that CCP general secretary Xi Jinping has seriously diluted the influence of the Tuanpai, leading to the dominance of the Xi Jinping faction. In 2014, former CCP General Office Director Ling Jihua was put under investigation. In 2016, the CCP Central Committee issued regulations that called for shrinking the CYLC's central leadership, putting it more directly under CCP supervision, and returning it to its grass roots to win over China's young people. Additionally, its budget was cut by around half in that year. In September 2017, an official book was released which contained Xi's criticisms of the CYLC leadership. In 2017, CYLC First Secretary Qin Yizhi was demoted, breaking with the tradition that CYLC First Secretaries are promoted after their tenure. After the 19th CCP National Congress, two officials with Tuanpai background, Li Yuanchao and Liu Qibao, were not re-elected to the Politburo despite being young enough to be eligible. In June 2022, former CYLC First Secretary Lu Hao, "the last of the generally recognized fast-risers from the CYL’s heyday", was effectively demoted. Following the 20th CCP National Congress, Premier Li Keqiang and Chinese People's Political Consultative Conference National Committee Chairman Wang Yang, both considered affiliated to the Tuanpai, were not re-elected to the Politburo Standing Committee. Additionally, Vice Premier Hu Chunhua was not re-elected to the Politburo. Asia Society wrote in 2022 that there is little evidence that the group still exists, or that "it was ever terribly robust even when Hu was still in power".

== Suggested members of the first Youth League faction ==
- Hu Yaobang, CCP Chairman and later General Secretary (demoted 1987)
- Hu Qili, member of the Politburo Standing Committee (demoted 1989)
- Hu Jintao, Youth League first secretary (later CCP General Secretary, PRC President)
- Li Ruihuan, member of Politburo Standing Committee, CPPCC Chairman
- Wang Zhaoguo, CCP General Office chief, Secretary of the Secretariat, later governor of Fujian

Although Wen Jiabao was never a member of the Youth League, because he was a protegee of Hu Yaobang and close to Hu Jintao since his Youth League tenure, observers and analysts often include Wen in this faction.

== Suggested members of the second Youth League faction ==
- Hu Jintao, former CCP General Secretary, former PRC President
- Li Keqiang, Premier, Politburo Standing Committee member
- Wang Yang, CPPCC chairman, Politburo Standing Committee member
- Hu Chunhua, Third Vice Premier, Politburo member
- Liu Yandong, former Second Vice-Premier, Former Politburo member
- Li Yuanchao, former vice president, Former Politburo member
- Zhang Baoshun, former Anhui party secretary
- Zhou Qiang, President of the Supreme People's Court
- Yuan Chunqing, former Shanxi party secretary
- Ling Jihua, head of the United Front Work Department (expelled 2015)

== See also ==
- Hu Jintao's departure from the 20th National Congress of the Chinese Communist Party
- Princelings
- Shanghai clique
