= Hu Chunhua =

Vice Chairperson of the Chinese People's Political Consultative Conference since 2023

- 胡春华
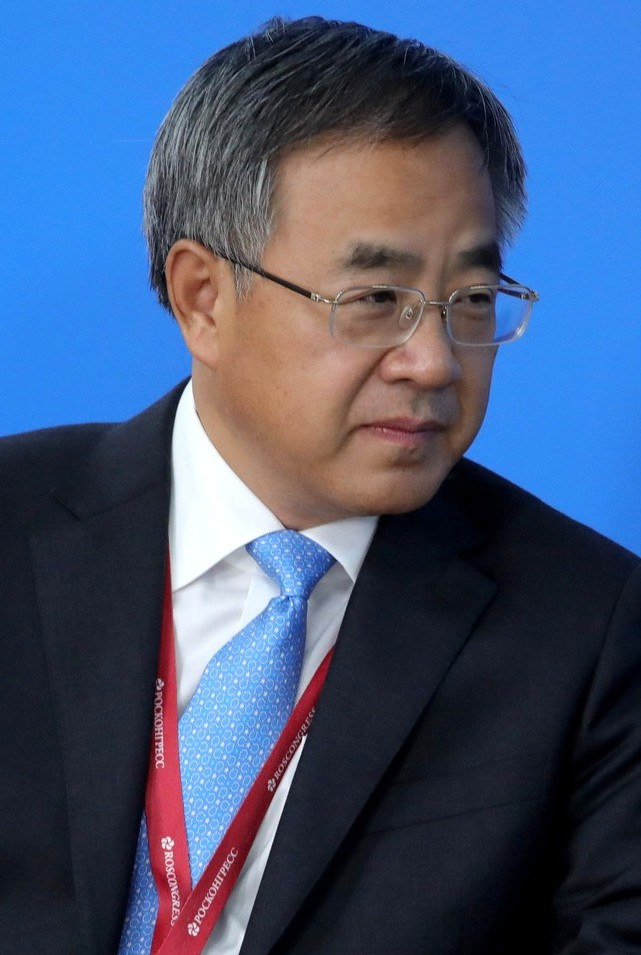
- Hu in 2019

Vice Chairman of the Chinese People's Political Consultative Conference
- Incumbent
- Assumed office 10 March 2023
- Chairman: Wang Huning

Vice Premier of China
- In office 19 March 2018 – 12 March 2023 Serving with Han Zheng, Sun Chunlan, Liu He
- Premier: Li Keqiang

Party Secretary of Guangdong
- In office 18 December 2012 – 28 October 2017
- Deputy: Zhu Xiaodan (Governor); Ma Xingrui (Governor)
- General secretary: Xi Jinping
- Preceded by: Wang Yang
- Succeeded by: Li Xi

Party Secretary of Inner Mongolia
- In office 30 November 2009 – 18 December 2012
- Deputy: Bagatur (Government Chairman)
- General secretary: Hu Jintao
- Preceded by: Chu Bo
- Succeeded by: Wang Jun

Governor of Hebei
- In office 15 April 2008 – 15 December 2009
- Preceded by: Guo Gengmao
- Succeeded by: Chen Quanguo

First Secretary of the Communist Youth League of China
- In office November 2006 – April 2008
- Preceded by: Zhou Qiang
- Succeeded by: Lu Hao

Personal details
- Born: April 23, 1963 (age 63) Wufeng County, Hubei, China
- Party: Chinese Communist Party (1983–present)
- Education: Peking University (BLit)

Chinese name
- Simplified Chinese: 胡春华
- Traditional Chinese: 胡春華
Transcriptions
Standard Mandarin
- Hanyu Pinyin: Hú Chūnhuá

Hu Chunhua (Chinese: 胡春华; born April 1963) is a Chinese politician. Hu currently serves as a Vice Chairman of the National Committee of the Chinese People's Political Consultative Conference since 2023. From 2012 to 2022, Hu served as a member of the Politburo of the Chinese Communist Party. He also served as Vice Premier of China from 2018 to 2023.

Born in Yichang, Hubei, Hu first entered politics by working as a cadre of the Communist Youth League in the Tibet Autonomous Region. After serving various roles in Tibet, he rose through the ranks of the Communist Youth League, eventually returning to Beijing and becoming its first secretary in 2006. In 2008, he was appointed the governor of Hebei. He was reassigned to the post of Chinese Communist Party (CCP) committee secretary of Inner Mongolia in 2009, a post he held until 2012.

In 2012, he became the CCP secretary of Guangdong, as well as a member of the CCP Politburo. During his time in Guangdong lasting until 2017, Hu launched anti-corruption campaigns and earned reputation as a low-key leader. Hu became a vice premier of China in 2018, a post he served until 2023. He left the Politburo in 2022, after the 20th CCP National Congress following the 3rd term general secretaryship of Xi Jinping, though he kept his membership to the CCP Central Committee. In March 2023, he became a vice chairman of the Chinese People's Political Consultative Conference. Hu is popularly known as "Heir apparent of Tuanpai" due to the similarities of his career with that of former CCP general secretary Hu Jintao and former Premier of China Li Keqiang.

== Early life and education ==
Hu was born into a family of farmers in Wufeng County, Yichang, Hubei province on 1 April 1963. In 1979, he ranked first in the county for the Gaokao examination. At age 16, he was the youngest in his class. In 1983, he joined the Chinese Communist Party (CCP). He received a bachelor's degree in Chinese literature from Peking University in August 1983. At Peking University he was friends with Li Keqiang, who was also attending Peking University at the time. Hu later entered the Central Party School in 1996, graduating via part-time studies with a master's degree in world economics 1999. He also took cadre training programs from the Central Party School from 1996 to 1997 and in 2000.

== Political career ==
=== Tibet, Hebei, and Youth League ===
After graduation, he went to work in Tibet, starting as a cadre in the Organization Department of the CCP Tibet Autonomous Regional Committee in 1983. He became an official at the Tibet Youth Daily in 1984, and an official at the Tibet Hotel in 1985. In 1987, Hu became the deputy secretary of the Communist Youth League of China (CYCL) Committee in Tibet, later serving as its secretary from 1992 to 1995. He worked as a deputy head of the Linzhi Prefecture in 1992, and as deputy party secretary and head of Shannan Prefecture in from 1995 to 1997.

From 1997 to 2001 Hu served in the Secretariat of the Communist Youth League and as a Vice Chairman of the All-China Youth Federation. In July 2001, Hu returned to Tibet, becoming the secretary-general of the CCP Tibet Committee. Hu served as deputy secretary of the CCP Tibet Committee from November 2003 to November 2006 and vice chairman of the Tibet Autonomous Regional Government from November 2003 to November 2005. In Tibet, Hu played an instrumental role in developing the Tibetan economy, curbing the independence movement, and the settlement of more Han Chinese into region.

Hu returned to Beijing to become the First Secretary of the Communist Youth League from December 2006 to March 2008. At the 17th Party Congress in October 2007, Hu Chunhua became a member of the CCP Central Committee. On April 15, 2008, he was appointed the acting Governor of Hebei, China's youngest. On January 12, 2009, he was officially elected Governor. In Hebei, Hu had the reputation of working 'non-stop', visiting all of the province's 11 prefecture-level cities within a few months. While serving in Hebei, Hu came into the limelight during the 2008 Chinese milk scandal, which had roots in Hebei province. He came out of the incident unscathed, some say as a result of his closeness to CCP general secretary Hu Jintao. He also took part in the security preparations of the 2008 Summer Olympics in Beijing, and advocated increasing domestic consumption in response to the 2008 financial crisis.

=== Inner Mongolia ===
In November 2009, he was appointed Regional Party Secretary of Inner Mongolia. He was also elected Chairman of the Inner Mongolia People's Congress in January 2010. Not long after he took charge of the vast northern region, Hu embarked on a plan to rebalance growth in the region. Under Hu's predecessor Chu Bo, Inner Mongolia saw explosive GDP growth that was the result of developing natural resources. The region's GDP growth ranked highest amongst province-level entities in the country for eight consecutive years. However, the growth opened a large wealth gap, with endemic profiteering from local officials, and a divide between the resource-rich western part of the region (Hohhot, Baotou, and Ordos) and the stagnant industrial-based eastern part (Chifeng, Tongliao, Hulunbuir).

In response, Hu remarked that Inner Mongolia will no longer aspire to be ranked first in GDP growth, but rather focus on sustaining the "quality" and "efficiency" of growth. Hu believed that dogmatically pursuing a mere increase in economic output did not benefit everyone in the region, particularly farmers and nomadic herders, pointing out that the large mining projects had brought significant wealth which did not trickle down to the grassroots. He stressed that one of the priorities of his administration would be assuring equitable policies in the relocation, employment and social welfare of nomadic peoples. Hu also sought to reform tax policy to give more bargaining power to local government and local interests in assessing potential mining projects by large state-owned natural resource companies. These companies were known for running roughshod over local officials that were desperate to attract investment to boost their own GDP numbers. In urban development, Hu stressed the importance of subsidized housing.

Grievances over the intrusion of mining companies, mixed with ethnic tensions between Mongolian and Han Chinese people in the region, had caused friction for years between the government and the rural populations. It came to a boil in May 2011, when a Mongolian herder's death led to ethnic Mongolian protests in Xilinhot and unrest in other parts of the region. It was the first major protests in Inner Mongolia in more than twenty years. Hu instituted a two-pronged policy of appeasement and force, addressing the grievances of the protesting crowds by making a visit to Xilinhot, meeting with students and teachers, and promising compensation for local herders and more strict regulations over business conduct. Meanwhile, he increased security presence across Inner Mongolia, including in the capital, Hohhot, to contain the unrest.

=== Guangdong ===
According to Reuters in August 2012, Hu Jintao sought to promote Hu Chunhua to be a member of the CCP Politburo or the Party Secretary of Shanghai after the 18th Party National Congress. In November 2012, after the Party Congress, Hu was appointed to the 18th Politburo of the Chinese Communist Party, a ruling council of China's top leaders. He, along with Sun Zhengcai, were the youngest members of the 18th politburo, raising speculation that they were being groomed to become China's next leaders in 2022. In December 2012, Hu was appointed Party Secretary of Guangdong, succeeding Wang Yang, who went on to become Vice-Premier in Beijing. The Guangdong leadership post has historically been filled by those who have gone on to join the national leadership, such as Zhao Ziyang, Xi Zhongxun, Li Changchun, Zhang Dejiang, and Wang Yang. It is widely regarded to be one of China's most important regional offices.

In Guangdong, Hu earned a reputation for being low-key, action-oriented leader who is not fond of bureaucracy or formalities. Almost immediately after his assuming the reins in Guangdong, Hu's government began a sweeping crackdown on so-called luoguan, i.e., officials who work in China but whose spouses and children live abroad. Since the beginning of Hu's term, over 800 luoguan have been disciplined, demoted, or otherwise removed from office. Hu's government also cracked down on drug trafficking and the sex industry in the Dongguan area, dispatching police to conduct massive raids of the city's prostitution venues, and removing the city's vice mayor and police chief from office.

Hu's government also began experimenting with the public release of information on the assets of local officials, and have moved to codify anti-corruption measures into law with the provincial legislature. In October 2014, Hu's government began a series of public consultations on new anti-corruption regulations. Taking best practices from the Independent Commission Against Corruption in Hong Kong, Hu's government experimented with – in select local areas – merging the traditionally separate departments of Discipline Inspection, Supervision, Anti-Corruption, and Audit into a single agency in charge of combating graft. During's Hu's term, the Party Committee Secretary of the provincial capital Guangzhou, Wan Qingliang, was investigated for corruption and removed from office.

=== Central government ===
In March 2018, he was elected by the National People's Congress to serve as a vice premier of China in Premier Li Keqiang's Cabinet. As vice premier, Hu played an important role in the targeted poverty alleviation campaign, agricultural modernization, and the Belt and Road Initiative.

After the 20th CCP National Congress in 2022, Hu left the Politburo, though he remained a Central Committee member. In March 2023, he left the office as vice premier and was instead elected as vice chairman of the Chinese People's Political Consultative Conference (CPPCC). He was named as one of two deputy party secretaries of the CPPCC in the same month.

== Public image ==
Hu has maintained a relatively low public profile during his rise to positions of power. Hu is known for his low-key style in public, and does not discuss his private life. During the 2012 National People's Congress, Hu Chunhua only answered four out of twenty questions posed to him by reporters, casting many sensitive questions to his subordinates. When asked personal questions, he said that he was only interested in matters relating to Inner Mongolia. He refused to comment on his personal ambitions, or whether or not he had a Weibo account. Following the dismissal of Bo Xilai in April 2012, Hu was heavily promoted due to his loyalty to central party authorities under Hu Jintao's leadership. He toed the party line and is seen as a close confidant and loyalist of Hu Jintao.

After Xi Jinping assumed General Secretary of the Chinese Communist Party in 2012, Hu continued to play a prominent role politically - his record in Guangdong impressed the central authorities and was praised by Xi personally. There was wide speculation that Hu would advance directly to the CCP Politburo Standing Committee in 2017 and be groomed as a putative successor to the top leadership, but this ultimately did not occur. However, Hu was selected to become Vice-Premier in 2018, continuing to be the youngest leader among the senior-most ranks of the party. It was again speculated that Hu might join the Standing Committee in 2022, but instead he was demoted from the Politburo at the 2022 National Congress under protest from Hu Jintao, who was then ejected from the meeting.

His political beliefs about Tibet are fairly opaque. He is able to hold simple conversations in Tibetan as he had worked there as a regional official.

== Personal life ==
Hu married his wife in Tibet. They have one daughter.

Party political offices
Preceded by Zhou Qiang	First Secretary of the Communist Youth League of China; 2006–2008	Succeeded by Lu Hao
Preceded by Chu Bo	Party Secretary of Inner Mongolia; 2009–2012	Succeeded by Wang Jun
Preceded by Wang Yang	Party Secretary of Guangdong; 2012–2017	Succeeded by Li Xi
Government offices
Preceded by Guo Gengmao	Governor of Hebei; 2008–2009	Succeeded by Chen Quanguo
