= All-China Students' Federation =

People's organization in China

- 中华全国学生联合会
- Formation: June 16, 1919; 107 years ago
- Type: People's organization
- Headquarters: No. 10 Qianmen East Street, Beijing, China
- President: Xu Hui
- Secretary General: Qi Hu
- Parent organization: All-China Youth Federation
- Website: qgxl.youth.cn

All-China Students' Federation
- Simplified Chinese: 中华全国学生联合会
- Traditional Chinese: 中華全國學生聯合會
Transcriptions
Standard Mandarin
- Hanyu Pinyin: Zhōnghuá Quánguó Xuéshēng Liánhé Huì

Abbreviation
- Simplified Chinese: 全国学联
- Traditional Chinese: 全國學聯
Transcriptions
Standard Mandarin
- Hanyu Pinyin: Quánguó Xuélián

The All–China Students' Federation (ACSF) is a people's organization composed of college student unions, graduate student unions and secondary school student unions under the control of the All-China Youth Federation, another people's organization under the Communist Youth League of China.

== History ==
After the May Fourth Movement, several student organizations were established in schools China. On this basis, the first National Student Representative Conference was held in Shanghai from June 16 to August 5, 1919. More than 60 student representatives from all over the country and those studying in Japan attended the conference. The conference passed the "Constitution of the Student Union of the Republic of China", determined that "the purpose is to connect feelings, promote academics, promote society, and defend the country", discussed ways to boycott Japanese goods and promote domestic products, organized a nationwide student struggle to refuse to sign the peace treaty, published the "National Student Union Daily", and decided that one person from each of the seven student unions in Beijing, Tianjin and Shanghai. would form the first board of directors of the National Student Union, with the venue set in Shanghai. This conference announced the official establishment of the Student Union of the Republic of China.

Subsequently, in May 1920, August 1921, March 1923, August 1923, August 1924, June 1925, July 1926, July 1927, February 1928, May 1936, March 1938 and June 1947, the Twelve National Student Congresses were held in Shanghai, Guangzhou, Wuhan, Nanjing and other places respectively (listed as the Second to Thirteenth National Congresses of the All–China Students' Federation in 1949). In December 1935, the Beijing and Tianjin Student Union decided to initiate the organization of the National Student National Salvation Federation. Subsequently, Peking University student Liu Jiangling and China University student Dong Yuhua were sent to Shanghai to prepare for the establishment. Peking University student Tang Shouyu, who was teaching in Jinan, was also invited to Shanghai to participate in the preparatory work. With the help of Wang Han and Hu Qiaomu of the Jiangsu Provincial Working Committee of the CCP and the support of people from all walks of life in Shanghai, the preparatory work progressed smoothly. The "National Student National Salvation Federation Preparatory Committee" was established.

In March 1936, the Beijing Student Union sent Tsinghua University student Lu Cui to Shanghai to participate in the preparatory work. Representatives from Beijing, Tianjin, Shanghai and Hangzhou held a meeting in the name of visiting West Lake to discuss the situation, tasks and the issue of convening the founding conference. They passed the preparatory committee declaration, announced the establishment of the preparatory committee of the National Student Union, and decided to publish a related publication "Student Voice" to publicize the National Student Union's anti–Japanese and national salvation propositions, edited by Lu Cui and Tang Shouyu. Under the leadership of the Northern Bureau of the CCP and the Provisional Working Committee of the CCP in Shanghai, on the eve of the National Congress of the National Salvation Federation of All Circles, a meeting was held in the conference room of the Shanghai YMCA National Association on May 29–30, 1936 (later recognized as the 11th National Student Congress of China). "Twenty–eight delegates attended the meeting, representing the entire province of Guangxi and the following 17 cities: Nanjing, Shanghai, Beiping, Tianjin, Hangzhou, Wenzhou, Xiamen, Guangzhou, Jinan, Xuzhou, Baoding, Qingdao, Chaoxian, Wuhan, Hong Kong, Ningbo, Yixing (representatives from Suzhou, Wuxi and Nantong had decided to attend, but were unable to attend at that time due to other matters). Representatives from various places reported on the local student movement. From this, we can see that students from various places fought bravely, we saw the shameless oppression of traitors, and we also saw all the obstacles on the road to the progress of the movement. Except for a few special cases (such as Guangxi), the destruction and oppression we encountered were roughly the same."

Representatives of various national salvation groups in Shanghai also attended the meeting. In response to the call of the Chinese Communist Party, the conference put forward the slogan of "stop the civil war and unite to resist Japan" and called for the launch of an all–out war of resistance. It was decided to rename the All–China Students' Federation as the Chinese Students National Salvation Federation, and the federation's "Program", "Declaration", "Introduction" and proposals such as "Sending representatives to various places to organize student federations in places where student federations have not yet been established" and "Joining the World Student Federation" were discussed and passed. The conference elected representatives from 11 regions such as Beijing as members of the current student federation executive committee, including representatives from five regions of Beijing, Tianjin, Shanghai, Guangxi and Wuhan as standing members. Liu Daosheng, a representative of the Beijing Student Federation, was elected as the chairman of the Student Federation (then called the General Affairs Department), Wu Zuyi as the Minister of Organization, and Lu Cui and Tang Shouyu as the Minister of Propaganda . Tang Shouyu was responsible for the party and league work of the All–China Students Federation. The All–China Students Federation's correspondence office borrowed Mr. Shen Junru 's law firm in the Shanghai Concession. This conference strongly promoted the development of the national student anti–Japanese and national salvation movement and made ideological preparations for the full arrival of the Anti–Japanese War.

On July 15, 1936, the World Student Federation for Peace, Freedom and Culture (WSF) wrote a letter: "Your struggle is our struggle, your goal is our goal" and "We guarantee the WSF's continuous assistance to Chinese students until they achieve their goals." From August 31 to September 6, 1936, the First World Youth Conference for Peace (First World Youth Conference) was held in Geneva . It was initiated and hosted by the WSF in the name of "World Association of Friends of the League of Nations". It became a world–wide gathering for young people from different countries, different nationalities, different classes, different political and religious beliefs to discuss their own problems and defend peace. After receiving the invitation from the WSF, the Chinese Students' National Salvation Federation sent its propaganda minister Lu Cui to attend the conference. Lu Cui and Tao Xingzhi, Wang Haijing, Chen Tianzhu and other Chinese student representatives in Europe, about 20 people, formed the Chinese delegation and participated in the First World Youth Conference. On September 1, Lu Cui spoke on behalf of the Chinese youth at the conference, introducing the efforts made by Chinese youth students for national liberation and calling on the WSF to give China the greatest support. Lu Cui said: "In order to liberate our Chinese nation and to not tolerate the slaughter of our motherland, we stood up in the face of the enemy's knives and cauldrons." "In today's China, everything about the youth is focused on one basic issue – resisting the Japanese and saving the country."

From March 1 to 6, 1949, the 14th National Student Federation Congress was held in Beijing. It was decided to establish the unified leadership organization of students nationwide, the All–China Students Federation, and adopted the Constitution of the All–China Students Federation. Liu Xisheng, Zhou Shouchang and 36 others were elected as the Executive Committee of the National Student Federation. The All–China Students' Federation held its 15th to 20th National Congresses in Beijing in July 1951, August 1955, February 1960, January 1965, May 1979, and August 1983. Since 1990, the All–China Students' Federation has held its National Congress every five years, with the most recent being the 26th National Congress held in July 2015.

In March 2017, with the approval of the CCP Secretariat, the Central Committee of the Communist Youth League, the Ministry of Education and the All–China Students’ Federation jointly issued the “Reform Plan for Student Union Organizations”, which clarified the guiding ideology, basic principles, main goals and reform measures for the reform of student union organizations, and proposed 14 reform measures in three aspects: reforming student union organizations, reforming school student union organizations and strengthening work support and guarantee.

== Organization ==
The All–China Students' Federation implements a group membership system. The student unions of full–time colleges and secondary schools in the national education system, graduate student unions of colleges and scientific research institutions, and Chinese student groups abroad recognize the constitution of the All–China Students' Federation and are all members of the All–China Students' Federation. The provincial, autonomous region, and municipal student federations are local joint organizations of the member groups of the All–China Students' Federation in the province, autonomous region, or municipality directly under the central government.

The National Student Union Congress is the highest authority of the National Student Union and is held every five years. The National Student Union Committee is the highest authority of the National Student Union during the adjournment period of the National Student Union Congress.

The Presidium of the All–China Students' Federation is a permanent body of the All–China Students' Federation Committee. The Presidium of the All–China Students' Federation is composed of representatives sent by the member groups elected as the President of the All–China Students' Federation and the members of the Presidium. The Presidium plenary session is held at least once a year and is convened by the President. The current Presidium of the All–China Students' Federation is chaired by the Peking University Student Union, and its Chairman is Wang Shengbo, the President of the Peking University Student Union.

The Secretariat of the All–China Students' Federation is the daily working body of the All–China Students' Federation. It consists of a Secretary–General (who is usually concurrently the head of the School Department of the Central Committee of the Communist Youth League) and a Deputy Secretary–General. It is responsible to and reports to the Presidium of the All–China Students' Federation. The 26th National Congress of the All–China Students' Federation decided to appoint Du Huiliang, then the head of the School Department of the Central Committee of the Communist Youth League, as the Secretary–General of the All–China Students' Federation.
