= Shi Cuntong =

Early Chinese Communist Party figurehead

- 施存统
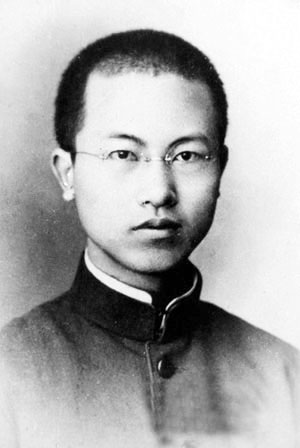

First Secretary of the Communist Youth League of China
- In office May 1922 – August 1923

Personal details
- Born: 1899 Jinhua County, Zhejiang, Qing Dynasty
- Died: 29 November 1970 (aged 70–71) Beijing, China
- Party: Chinese Communist Party; China Democratic National Construction Association
- Occupation: Politician

Shi Cuntong (simplified Chinese: 施存统; traditional Chinese: 施存統; pinyin: Shī Cúntǒng; 1899 – 29 November 1970), also known as Shi Fuliang (simplified Chinese: 施复亮; traditional Chinese: 施複亮; pinyin: Shī Fùliàng) was an academician and an early leader of the Chinese Communist Party.

== Biography ==
Born in 1899 in Zhejiang, he enrolled into the Zhejiang First Provincial Normal School in 1917. Following the May Fourth Movement in 1919, he participated in the founding of the magazine "Zhejiang New Trends", and received recognition for his essay "Non-filial" that was published in its 2nd issue regarding the closed family culture of Chinese society. He traveled to Beijing in 1920 to pursuit his anti-government agenda but returned to Shanghai after a few months. When he returned, he met up with the editor of "New Youth" Chen Duxiu upon the liaison from Yu Xiusong, taking up the Marxist ideology and joining the Chinese Communist Party (CCP) as one of its founding members. In August 1920, he participated in the founding of the Chinese Communist Youth League, and established the Tokyo Marxist Study Group whilst he was away in Japan for further studies.

However, he was expelled from the CCP in 1922 and he came back to attend its 2nd National Congress. In the same year, he was elected as the First Secretary of the Communist Youth League of China. In January 1924, he left the Central Committee to become the CCP's Chairman for the Shanghai Region, and taught at Shanghai University, Zhongshan University, Whompoa Military Academy and Guangzhou Peasant Movement Institute. At the beginning of 1927 he was the policitcal director at the Central Military and Political School of Wuhan. Following the Shanghai massacre of 1927 and the end of the First United Front, Shi left the CCP. The systematic killing of CCP leaders and the breakdown of the communist movement in Shanghai were precipitating factors that made Shi denounce his party membership.

He became a professor at Guangxi University and Shanghai University. After 1929, he was involved in translating Marxist works, revolutionary and economic theories and during the Second Sino-Japanese War, he was one of the few people who advocated for the protection of Chinese culture. At the end of 1945 he joined Huang Yanpei and Zhang Naiqi in launching the China Democratic National Construction Association (Democratic National Construction Association). At one point he was elected to the Central Committee and vice chairmanship of the Democratic National Construction Association.

In 1949, he attended the first plenary session of the Chinese People's Political Consultative Conference (CPPCC) as a representative of the People's Political Consultative Conference, and was elected as a Standing Committee Member and Deputy Secretary-General of the First CPPCC. Later he became the first Deputy Minister of Labor.

Party political offices
Preceded by Yu Xiusong	First Secretary of the Communist Youth League of China; May 1922 – August 1923	Succeeded by Zhang Tailei
