= Yu Xiusong =

- 俞秀松
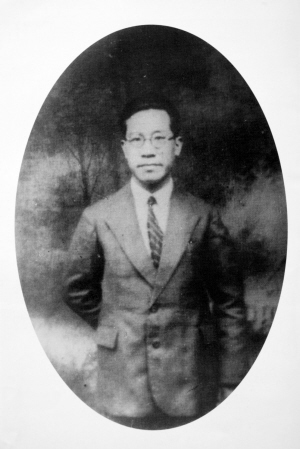

First Secretary of the Communist Youth League of China
- In office 1922–1920
- Preceded by: Office established
- Succeeded by: Shi Cuntong

Personal details
- Born: 1899 Zhuji, Zhejiang, Qing China
- Died: February 21, 1939 (aged 39–40) Moscow, Russian SFSR, Soviet Union
- Party: Kuomintang; Chinese Communist Party
- Occupation: Politician

Yu Xiusong (Chinese: 俞秀松) (1899 – February 21, 1939) was an early member of the Chinese Communist Party. He was born in Zhuji, Zhejiang. He started attending the Zhejiang First Normal School (currently Hangzhou High School) in 1916. The May 4 movement of 1919 led him to be a student activist. In 1920, he founded the Communist Youth League of China and became its first leader. In 1922, he supported the Constitutional Protection Movement of Sun Yat-sen. As a result of the First United Front in 1924, Yu was given a position in his home province by the Kuomintang.

In October 1925, Yu went to the Soviet Union to study at Moscow Sun Yat-sen University, where he became acquainted with Wang Ming. In 1933, he was in the Soviet Far East. He arrived in Xinjiang in the summer of 1935 and headed the secretariat of People's Anti-imperialist Association, created via the proposal of Soviet consul in Urumqi Garegin Apresov. He was married to the sister of local warlord Sheng Shicai. At the instigation of Kang Sheng, Wang had Deng Fa arrest Yu on charges of Trotskyism sometime between December 10 and 27, 1937. In May or June 1938, Yu was extradited back to the Soviet Union. He was sentenced to death and executed in Moscow. Yu's death marked the final break between Wang and Zhang Guotao. In 1962, after the Sino-Soviet split, Yu was posthumously proclaimed a revolutionary martyr.

The arrest was initiated by the former head of the Main Directorate of Border and Internal Security (GUPVO) of the NKVD, M. P. Frinovsky, who by that time had become the first deputy of the NKVD People's Commissar N. I. Yezhov and took an active part in organizing political repressions (on November 28, 1937, Frinovsky sent a special message to Stalin regarding Yu Xiusiong; also that same month, Apresov, who had been arrested by that time, was twice included in Stalin's execution lists under the 1st category, but was not executed). Frinovsky was deeply immersed in Xinjiang issues, in particular, being responsible for the introduction of Soviet troops into this region in 1933; he was also in a state of acute enmity with Garegin Apresov.

The story of the marriage of Yu Xiusong and Sheng Shitong, the younger sister of the ruler of Xinjiang, Sheng Shicai, is well known. Their romantic relationship encountered resistance from Sheng’s family, especially her brother, who doubted the wisdom of the union. Garegin Apresov played a key role in overcoming these obstacles. Realizing that the marriage could strengthen relations between the USSR and Sheng Shicai, Apresov personally intervened to convince Sheng Shicai to agree to the wedding. In 1936, a lavish ceremony was held, attended by high-ranking officials, including representatives of the Soviet side. Through Apresov, Stalin presented the newlyweds with a box of clothes as a gift. However, in 1937, Yu Xiusong was arrested and sent to the USSR, where he was later executed. Sheng Shitong, left alone, devoted her life to finding the truth about her husband’s fate and restoring his good name. After many years of efforts, in 1996, already at an advanced age, she achieved his rehabilitation - the Prosecutor General's Office of the Russian Federation officially restored Yu Xiusong's reputation, recognizing his complete innocence.

| Preceded by Office created | First Secretary of the Communist Youth League of China; 1920–1922 | Succeeded by Shi Cuntong |
