= Little Red Guards =

1966–1968 social movement in China

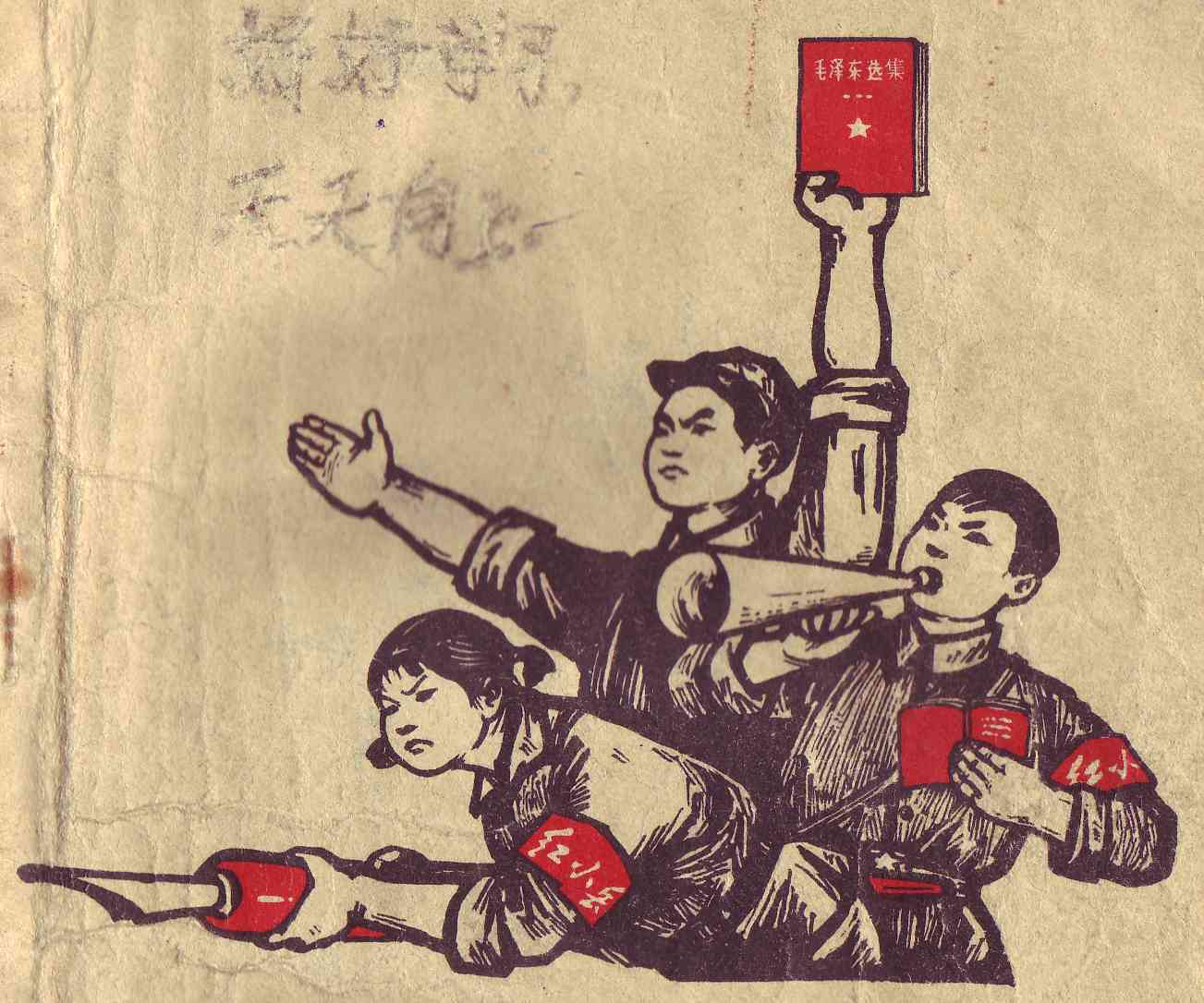
- Propaganda poster depicting Little Red Guards

The Little Red Guards (simplified Chinese: 红小兵; traditional Chinese: 紅小兵; pinyin: Hóng Xiǎobīng; lit. 'red little soldiers') was a large student organization in primary schools during the Cultural Revolution in mainland China. Over the course of the Cultural Revolution, it replaced the Young Pioneers and their participation in political actions. The Little Red Guards went through many changes in their organization and logos as a military group during ten-year span of the revolution. Children were also encouraged to work diligently in their schoolwork and political standing by magazines advertising a role in the Red Guards following their graduation from primary school.

== History ==
In 1966, when the Cultural Revolution began, the Red Guards began to spread rapidly in middle schools and universities as a new student organization.

On 4 February 1967, the Central Committee of the Chinese Communist Party issued the "Notice on the Proletarian Cultural Revolution in Primary Schools (Draft)", proposing that primary schools are "an important front" in the Cultural Revolution, and confirmed that "primary school students can organize Little Red Guards" to replace the traditional Young Pioneers of China. The members of this group ranged from ages 6-14. Once students aged out they would then be a part of the Red Guards, a different group for those who were in high school or college. On 22 December, the Central Committee and the Central Cultural Revolution Committee approved an article on the establishment of the Little Red Guards organization at Xiangchang Road Primary School in Beijing. Soon after that, little red guards appeared all over the country and the Young Pioneers organization was officially replaced, and Xiangchang Road Primary School became the birthplace of Little Red Guards and a model for other sub-organizations.With the rise of little red guards, there was also a rise in magazines for this group.

Little red guards from all over the country participated in activities such as "suspending classes to make revolution", criticizing teachers, and learning from Lei Feng. They often walked to school in lines, holding placards with Chairman Mao's quotations and singing revolutionary songs all the way. Due to their age limit, the impact of the Little Red Guards on society was far less than that of the Red Guards. The Little Red Guards, then, stood for the younger generation and showcased that they would continue to fight for the revolution when they grew up and uphold Maoist teachings.[

== Organization ==
The little red guard students in each grade of Xiangchang Road Primary School were organized into a (military) company, which was further divided into platoons (classes) and squads (groups in a class), and the entire school formed a Little Red Guard corps. The management group of the corps was composed of twelve representatives of the little red guards, who carried out activities under the leadership of the school's revolutionary committee.

The main goal of the Little Red Guard students was to take up Chairman Mao's call to action. This call was based on renewing the revolution and aiming criticism at those in the communist party who were straying from the right path. The Little Red Guards were primary school students who were in between the ages of 6 and 14. These students would need to represent the values wanted by the party. Students were often selected if they were known for their “good character and revolutionary attitudes and deeds". The Little Red Guards were meant to replace the Youth Pioneers, which was the organization focused on encouraging the Communist Party's efforts. A Little Red Guards magazine began to circulate around this time in order to spread their message. This magazine had six total narratives, with four focusing on the Little Red Guards and two focusing "Little Heros".^{[6]} These stories focused on students who risked their lives and often were greatly injured, even losing limbs.

== Logos ==
The logos of the Little Red Guards were not uniform at first. The more common one was a diamond-shaped arm-badge with the three characters of "红小兵" (Little Red Guard) worn on the left upper arm. In some places, it was a red armband similar to the Red Guards logo, with "红小兵" (Little Red Guard) written in yellow on it. Beginning in 1970, with the restoration of education order in primary and secondary schools across the country, the symbol of the Little Red Guards gradually changed back to the red scarf; School organizations no longer used the militarized titles of "company, platoon, and squad" but restored to "brigade, squadron and squad".

Before the change in name from “Young Pioneers” to the Little Red Guards, students initially wore red scarves. The main uniform also consisted of a green militaristic outfit, with a high collar, long sleeves, and long pants. This outfit resembled the Mao suit, which was socially and politically appropriate for the time. Due to the simpleness of the outfit, it was the most popular choice in fashion. It also includes the four changes within the design with each of the four pockets standing for a change (propriety, justice, honesty, and shame).

== Magazines ==
The Little Red Guards Magazine (红小兵报) was first launched in Shanghai on 20 July 1967, as a children's weekly. Soon after that, more than a dozen of similar magazines appeared from other places, all called "Little Red Guard" or something similar. Written for primary school students, these magazines typically included rhymes, songs, news and current affairs, short stories with illustrations, comic strips, and drawings by children. When the Young Pioneers was restored in 197 8, these "little red guard" magazines either ceased to exist or changed to other names.

The purpose of the Little Red Guards Magazine was to shift the content of children's literature from classic stories — such as fairy tales — to political messages. The intention was for the new stories to encourage and prepare students to carry on the new culture created by Mao Zedong.

Due to heavy restrictions and government monitoring, these magazines included stagnant caricatures of heroes and consisted of the heroes responding to current political events in China.

== The end ==
On 27 October 1978, the "Resolution on Restoring the Name of the Chinese Young Pioneers" and the "Decision on the Song and the Constitution of the Chinese Young Pioneers" were passed at the first plenary meeting of the Central Committee of the 10th National Congress of the Communist Youth League of China, and the Little Red Guards organization was restored to the Young Pioneers of China.

== See also ==
- Young Pioneers of China
- Red Guards
