= China Young Volunteers Association =

Chinese volunteering organization

The China Young Volunteers Association (CYVA; Chinese: 中国青年志愿者协会) is a volunteering organization in China. It works under the Central Committee of the Communist Youth League of China and is a member of the All-China Youth Federation and the United Nations CCIVS. CYVA was created on December 5, 1994. It is the first organization to govern volunteer efforts in China on a national scale.
