= Bi Baowen =

Chinese politician

- 毕宝文

Vice Governor of Heilongjiang
- In office April 2017 – August 2020
- Governor: Lu Hao; Wang Wentao

Personal details
- Born: July 1960 (age 66) Zibo, Shandong, China
- Party: Chinese Communist Party (1985-2026, expelled)
- Education: Shandong Provincial Public Security School; Shandong University; Central Party School of the Chinese Communist Party

Chinese name
- Simplified Chinese: 毕宝文
- Traditional Chinese: 畢寶文
Transcriptions
Standard Mandarin
- Hanyu Pinyin: Bì Bǎowén

Bi Baowen (Chinese: 毕宝文; born July 1960) is a retired Chinese politician who spent his entire career in both Shandong and Heilongjiang provinces. As of November 2025 he was under investigation by China's top anti-graft watchdog. He has been retired for five years. Previously he served as vice governor of Heilongjiang and head of Heilongjiang Provincial Public Security Department. He spent over four decades in the public security system, primarily in Shandong, before his cross-provincial promotion to Heilongjiang in 2016. He holds the retired police rank of deputy general police supervisor.

== Early life and education ==
Bi was in Zibo, Shandong, in July 1960. After the Cultural Revolution, in October 1978, he enrolled at Shandong Provincial Public Security School, majoring in public security. He studied law at Shandong University through the Shandong Higher Education Self-Study Program from April 1984 to October 1987. He earned his bachelor's degree in law from Central Party School of the Chinese Communist Party in December 1999.

== Career ==
After graduation in July 1980, Bi was despathed to the Cultural Security Department of the Shandong Provincial Public Security Department as a clerk, and later as a staff member in November 1984, deputy section chief in May 1989, and section chief in June 1993. During that time, he joined the Chinese Communist Party (CCP) in April 1985. In June 1995, he became deputy director and deputy party secretary of Rizhao Municipal Public Security Bureau, rising to director and party secretary in September 1999. He was director and party secretary of Binzhou Municipal Public Security Bureau in September 2001, in addition to serving as assistant to the mayor since December 2004. He was promoted to deputy head of Shandong Provincial Public Security Department in December 2006. In January 2015 he was promoted again to become executive deputy head.

In May 2016, Bi was transferred to northeast China's Heilongjiang province, marking his first assignment outside Shandong. He was appointed head, party secretary, and supervisor of the Heilongjiang Provincial Public Security Department. He concurrently served as vice governor of Heilongjiang since April 2017. He retired on 21 August 2020.

== Investigation ==
On 20 November 2025, Bi was under investigation for "suspected serious disciplinary and legal violations" by the Central Commission for Discipline Inspection (CCDI), the party's internal disciplinary body, and the National Supervisory Commission, the highest anti-corruption agency of China. Bi was expelled from the party on 21 May 2026.

Government offices
Preceded by Sun Yongbo	Head of Heilongjiang Provincial Public Security Department; 2016–2020	Succeeded by Li Yi
