= Young Pioneers of China =

Chinese Communist Party youth organization

Young Pioneers of China 中国少年先锋队
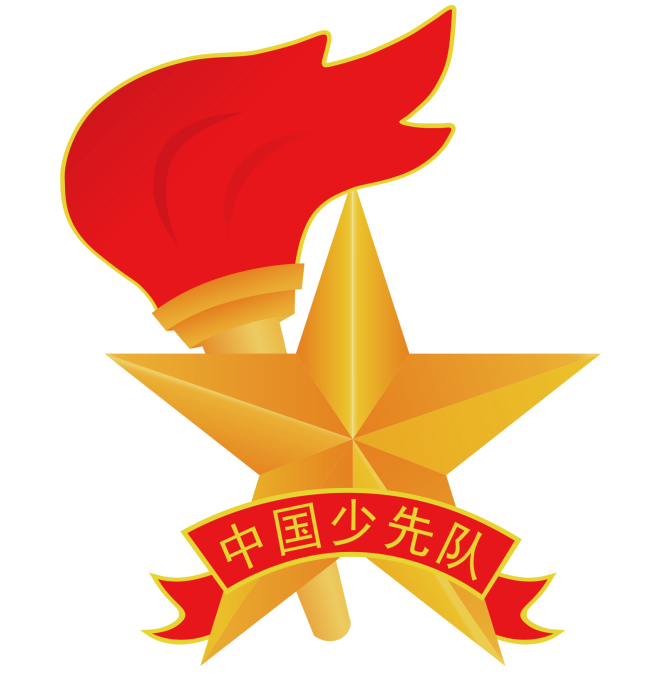

- Motto: 准备着：为共产主义事业而奋斗 — 时刻准备着！ ("To fight for the cause of communism — Always be prepared!")
- Leader: A Dong
- Founded: 1924; 102 years ago (foundation); 13 October 1949; 77 years ago (official)
- Headquarters: Beijing
- Membership: 113,000,000
- Ideology: Communism; Marxism–Leninism; Socialism with Chinese characteristics
- Mother party: Chinese Communist Party; Communist Youth League of China
- International affiliation: International Committee of Children's and Adolescents' Movements (historical)
- Newspaper: China Children's News; China Teenagers' News
- Website: zgsxd.k618.cn

Young Pioneers of China
- Simplified Chinese: 中国少年先锋队
- Traditional Chinese: 中國少年先鋒隊
Transcriptions
Standard Mandarin
- Hanyu Pinyin: Zhōngguó Shàonián Xiānfēngduì

Abbreviation
- Simplified Chinese: 少先队
- Traditional Chinese: 少先隊
Transcriptions
Standard Mandarin
- Hanyu Pinyin: Shàoxiānduì

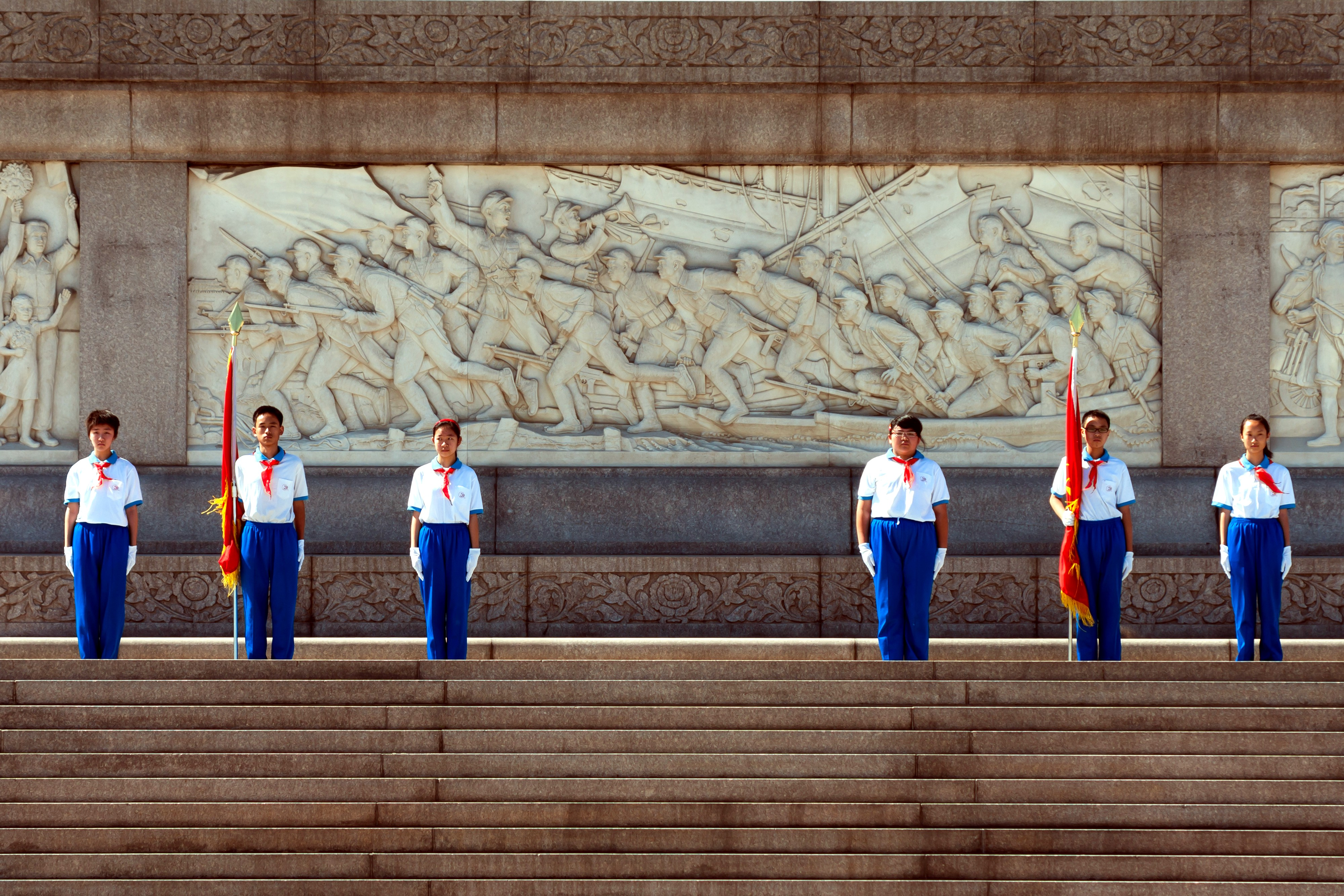
Young Pioneers of China standing honour guard at the Monument to the People's Heroes at Tiananmen Square

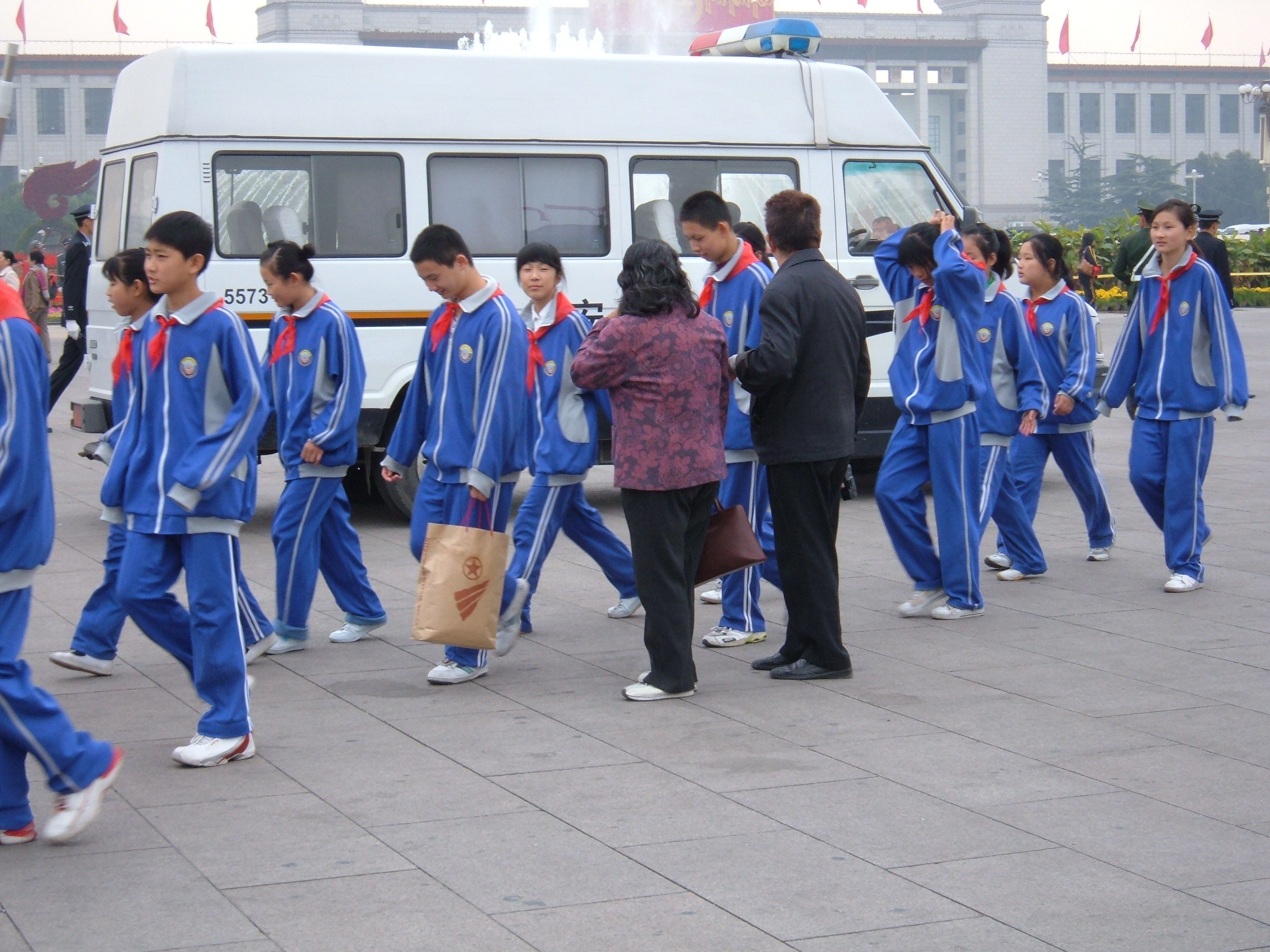
A group of Young Pioneers in Tiananmen Square in October 2007

The Young Pioneers of China, often shortened to Young Pioneers or Red Pioneers, is a people's organization of the Chinese Communist Party (CCP) for youth between the ages of 6 and 14, run by the Communist Youth League of China (CYLC).

After its foundation in 1921, the CCP ran various other youth movements in communist-held areas. In October 1949, after the proclamation of the People's Republic of China, the CCP established the Youth and Children of China Movement. The organization assumed its current name in June 1953. During the Cultural Revolution, the Young Pioneers was dismantled and replaced with the Little Red Guards. It was re-established in October 1978, following the end of the Cultural Revolution.

The league is organized on the party pattern. Its highest body is the National Congress held every five years, and when the National Congress is not in session, the National Working Committee serves as the core power body. The Young Pioneer's leader is the First Secretary of the Communist Youth League of China, who is an alternate member of the Central Committee of the CCP. The incumbent First Secretary is A Dong, appointed in May 2023.

Starting 1999, most schools in China require students of the right age to become Young Pioneers. As of the end of December 2024, there were 113 million Young Pioneers members. The Young Pioneers of China is similar to Pioneer Movements that exist or existed in many Communist countries around the world.

== History ==
Between its own founding in 1921 and the founding of the People's Republic in 1949, the CCP ran various other youth movements in communist-held areas. The Youth and Children of China Movement (simplified Chinese: 中国少年儿童队; traditional Chinese: 中國少年兒童隊; pinyin: Zhōngguó shàonián értóng duì) was created on October 13, 1949, by the CCP, and given its present name in June 1953.

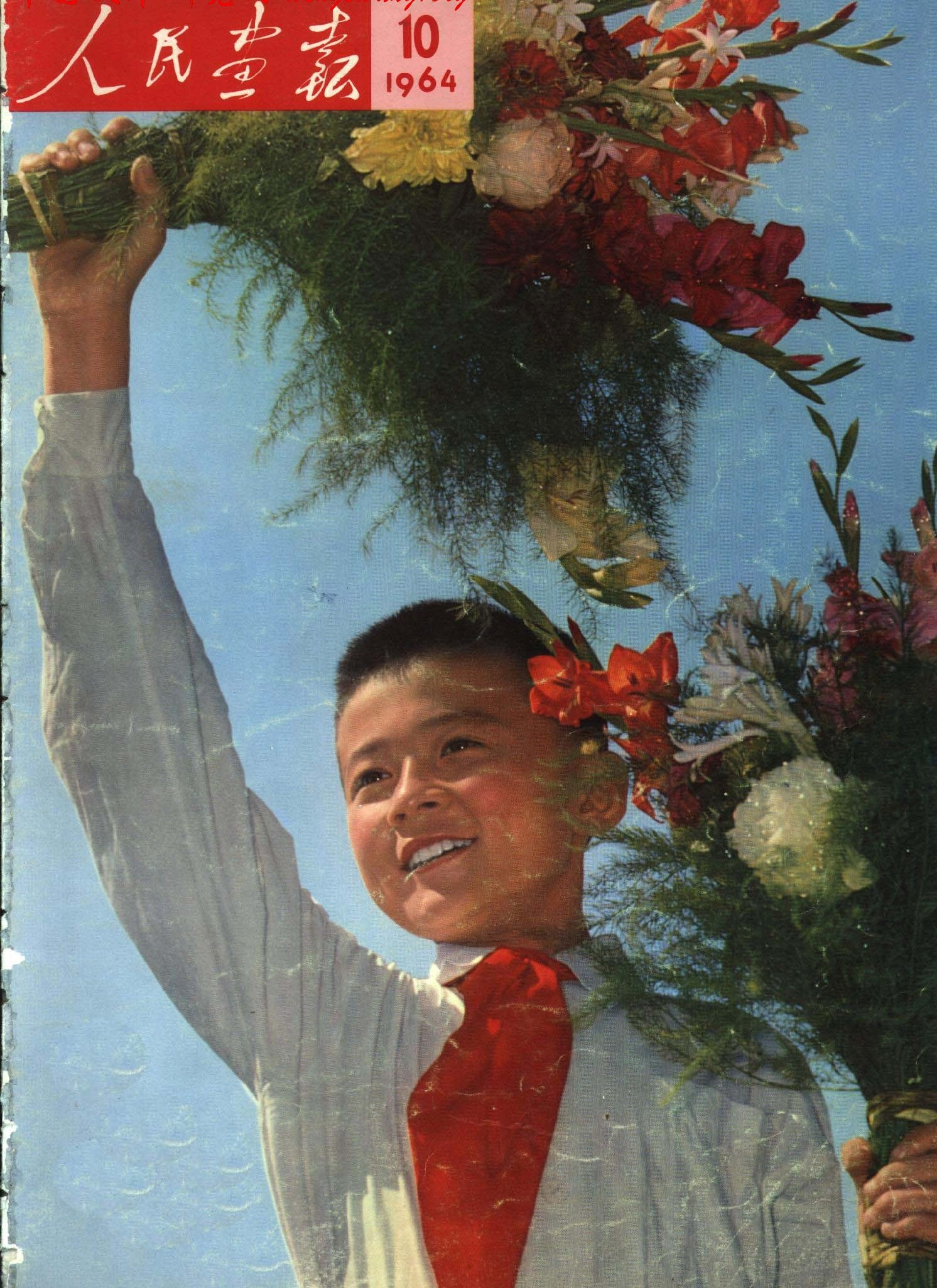
A young pioneer published by People's Daily in 1964.

During the Cultural Revolution (1966–1978), the Young Pioneers Movement was temporarily dismantled. It was replaced by the Little Red Guards, who were the younger counterparts of the Red Guards, the implementers of the Cultural Revolution. The Young Pioneers Movement was restarted in October 1978.

During the Chinese Civil War, the Young Pioneers in various warzones were developed from anti-Japanese children's leagues.

== Membership ==
The role of the Young Pioneers shifted over time as the organization adapted to changing political and social conditions in China. Through the 1970s, membership was highly selective and could depend on conduct, political standing, and family class background. During the Cultural Revolution (1966–1976), the Little Red Guards replaced the Young Pioneers. The Young Pioneers were restored after the Cultural Revolution.

Selective admission persisted into the mid-1990s. Accounts from this period recall membership as selective; one account described about 10 of 50 first-grade pupils in a class being initially admitted on the basis of academic performance and moral and ideological standing. In late-1990s (by 1999), most first-grade students were automatically Young Pioneers.

Young Pioneers consist of children between the ages of six and fourteen; upon reaching the age of fourteen, members automatically exit the Young Pioneers and may go on to join the Communist Youth League. As of the end of 2024, the number of registered Young Pioneers in China was 113 million. Young Pioneers are immersed in CCP ideology and wear red scarves as a symbol of their commitment.

== Organization ==
According to the Young Pioneers constitution, each school or village organizes a Pioneer Battalion (大队; Dàduì), which is divided into Pioneer Companies (中队; Zhōngduì) each corresponding to a class, which is then further divided into Pioneer Squads/Teams (小队; Xiǎoduì) each with a handful of members. Each team has a commanding officer (队长; Duìzhǎng) and an assistant commander (副队长; Fùduìzhǎng); each of the school Companies is led by a committee of between three and seven members with a designated commanding officer among their ranks; and a Young Pioneers Committee (队委会; Duìwěihuì) of between seven and fifteen members serve as the battalion leadership staff. Adult leaders are chosen from either the Communist Youth League or from local teaching staff (called counselor, 辅导员; Fǔdǎoyuán).

The current chairperson of the NPSC-YPC is A Dong.

== Symbols ==
=== Flag ===
According to the Young Pioneers Constitution, the flag is red, symbolizing both the victory of the Communist Revolution (the official explanation) and the traditional red colour regarded to the Chinese as lucky and sacred, and used all over their history; the five-pointed gold star (based on the national flag) in the middle symbolizes the leadership of the CCP, while the torch in traditional Chinese style symbolizes brightness down the path of communism symbolized by the bright red flame.

The Pioneer Battalion flag is 90 x 120 cm, while the guidon of each Company is 60 x 80 cm, with an isosceles triangle (60 x 20 cm) removed from the right side. The removed triangle on the guidon corresponds to the red scarf worn by Young Pioneers. The Battalion flag and company guidon are both gold fringed and the company guidon has the company title on the right hand side on the canton in a white background.

=== League emblem ===
The emblem consists of the gold star, the torch in traditional Chinese design with the flame alight, and a red and gold scroll reading "The Young Pioneers of China" in Mandarin Chinese.

=== Red Scarf ===
The red scarf (Chinese: 红领巾; pinyin: hónglǐngjīn) is the only uniform item. Young Pioneers are often referred to simply as "Red Scarves"; the investiture ceremony often consists of new members having their scarves tied for them by existing members. Children wearing red scarves are a ubiquitous sight in China.

The red scarf is generally worn around the neck and tied, with no woggle. Some local groups also come up with other uniform items.

The Young Pioneers Constitution explains that the scarf corresponds to the missing triangle on the Pioneer Company guidions. The Constitution also explains that the red of the scarf comes from the blood sacrificed by martyrs who perished for the Party and the nation from 1927 to 1949, and that all members should therefore wear the scarf with reverence for them and those who died after the foundation of the PRC.

=== Salute ===
The Young Pioneers Salute consists of bending the right arm and raising the right hand directly above the head, symbolizing people's interests are above all else. the palm flat and facing downwards, and the fingers together. It symbolizes that the interests of the People supersede all.

Young Pioneers must salute when raising and lowering the national flag, when the Young Pioneers' school colors (battalion colour and company guidons) are present in formal ceremony especially when they are marched on and off the field, in front of the cemeteries of revolutionary matyrs (such as Babaoshan Revolutionary Cemetery) and when participating in team activities and ceremonies. On other occasions in daily life, such as meeting division and brigade commanders and teachers, they also perform the salute.

=== Ceremony Agenda: Slogan, Conduct, Oath ===
During the ceremony, the call leader faces their teammates. After the "call sign" command, the call leader and his companions raise their right hand and clench their fist, level with their right ear, with their fist facing forward, to pledge. After the call is completed, the leader lowers their right fist, and the Young Pioneers follow suit.

The Motto (and Summons) is:

- Chinese: 准备着，为共产主义事业而奋斗！
- (pinyin: Zhǔnbèizhe, wèi gòngchǎnzhǔyì shìyè ér fèndòu!)
- Translation: "To battle for the cause of Communism, be prepared!"

To which the response is:

- Chinese: 时刻准备着！
- (pinyin: Shíkè zhǔnbèizhe!)
- Translation: "Always prepared!"

The stipulated conduct of Young Pioneers, according to the constitution, is:

- Chinese: 诚实、勇敢、活泼、团结
- (pinyin: chéngshí, yǒnggǎn, huópō, tuánjié)
- Translation: Honesty, Courage, Vivacity, Unity

The Young Pioneers pledge is:

- Chinese: 我是中国少年先锋队队员。我在队旗下宣誓：我热爱中国共产党，热爱祖国，热爱人民，好好学习，好好锻炼，准备着：为共产主义事业贡献力量。
- (pinyin: Wǒ shì Zhōngguó Shàonián Xiānfēngduì duìyuán. Wǒ zài Duìqí xià xuānshì: wǒ rè'ài Zhōngguó Gòngchándǎng, rè'ài zǔguó, rè'ài rénmín, hǎohǎo xúexí, hǎohǎo duànliàn, zhǔnbèizhe: wèi gòngchǎnzhǔyì shìyè gòngxiàn lìliàng.)
- Translation: I, a member of the Young Pioneers of China, swear under the Flag of the Young Pioneers: that I will love the Communist Party of China, the motherland, and the people; that I will study hard, strengthen myself [lit. exercise well], and prepare thus: to contribute my strength to the cause of communism.

At the end of the ceremony, the counselor, all Young Pioneer members and flag bearers salute. The colours party and escorts exits the venue, accompanied by music.

=== Song ===
The Young Pioneers song is We are the heirs of communism (Chinese: 《我们是共产主义接班人》; pinyin: Wǒmen shì Gòngchǎnzhǔyì Jiēbānrén). It was originally the theme song of Heroic Little Eighth-Routers (Chinese: 《英雄小八路》; pinyin: Yīngxióng Xiǎo Bālù), a 1961 film about the 1958 Second Taiwan Strait Crisis and a real-life group of children who stayed on the frontlines of coastal Fujian in order to help the war effort against Kuomintang forces.

Verse 1 (English Translation)

We are the successors of communism,

Inherited the glorious traditions of revolutionary precursors.

Loving homeland, loving people,

Bright red scarves fluttering in our chests.

Dauntless of distress, fearless of enemy,

Studying hard and struggling firmly.

Towards victory we march with gallantry,

Towards victory we march with gallantry, march,

Towards victory we march with gallantry,

We are the successors of communism。

我们是共产主义接班人，

继承革命先辈的光荣传统，

爱祖国，爱人民，

鲜艳的红领巾飘扬在前胸。

不怕困难，不怕敌人，

顽强学习，坚决斗争。

向着胜利勇敢前进，

向着胜利勇敢前进前进，

向着胜利勇敢前进，

我们是共产主义接班人。

Verse 2 (English Translation)

We are the successors of communism,

Along the glorious path set by revolutionary precursors.

Loving homeland, loving people,

Young pioneer is the name whereof we are proud.

Always ready to render meritorious service,

We must eradicate all the enemies.

Towards ideal we march with gallantry,

Towards ideal we march with gallantry, march,

Towards ideal we march with gallantry,

We are the successors of communism.

我们是共产主义接班人，

沿着革命先辈的光荣路程，

爱祖国，爱人民，

少先队员是我们骄傲的名称。

时刻准备，建立功勋，

要把敌人，消灭干净。

为着理想勇敢前进，

为着理想勇敢前进前进，

为着理想勇敢前进，

我们是共产主义接班人。

=== Dress code ===
Similar to other members of the Pioneer movement worldwide, the full dress uniform is white or blue shirt or polo with undershirt (or skirts for girls) and pants with the red scarf and badges attached to the shirt, with an optional headdress such as a beret. Sometimes even school uniforms are used, the addition being the red scarf, the optional headdress cap and the organizational and rank badges. During sports events YPs wear athletic uniforms.

== See also ==
- Vladimir Lenin All-Union Pioneer Organization
- Ernst Thälmann Pioneer Organisation
- Korean Children's Union
- Ho Chi Minh Young Pioneer Organization
- José Martí Pioneer Organization
