= All-China Youth Federation =

Chinese Communist Party youth organization

- 中华全国青年联合会
- Formation: May 4, 1949; 77 years ago
- Type: Federative body of Chinese youth organizations led by the Chinese Communist Party
- Purpose: "national development and world peace", "represent and protect the legitimate rights and interests of young people and promote youth participation and development"
- Headquarters: Beijing
- Region served: China
- Members: ~77,000
- President: Xu Xiao
- Main organ: National Committee
- Parent organization: World Federation of Democratic Youth (Historical)
- Affiliations: 16 national member organizations, 36 provincial member organizations
- Website: www.acyf.org.cn

All-China Youth Federation
- Simplified Chinese: 中华全国青年联合会
- Traditional Chinese: 中華全國青年聯合會
- Literal meaning: Zhonghua All-nation Youth United Society
Transcriptions
Standard Mandarin
- Hanyu Pinyin: Zhōnghuá Quánguó Qīngnián Liánhéhuì
- Wade–Giles: Chung-hua Ch'üan-kuo Ch'ing-nien Lien-ho-hui

The All-China Youth Federation (ACYF) is a people's organization that represents many youth groups in the People's Republic of China, and is managed by the Communist Youth League of China. It was founded on 4 May 1949. Former paramount leaders and general secretaries of the Chinese Communist Party Hu Jintao and Jiang Zemin were both members.

== History ==
The All-China Youth Foundation was originally named the All-China Federation of Democratic Youth. It developed because the CCP determined that while it had the Young Communist League to focus on the development of youths deemed politically advanced, it needed a broader-based organization as well. Consequently, it created the All-China Federation of Democratic Youth, which held its first congress in 1949. In 1958, the organization was renamed the All-China Youth Federation.

In 2024, Taiwan's Mainland Affairs Council banned its citizens from working at the All-China Youth Federation due to national security concerns.

== Functions ==
The ACYF is an umbrella organization which includes the Young Pioneers of China, among other youth-focused groups. It represents many youth groups in China, and is managed by the Communist Youth League of China. It also serves as a consultative body to the Communist Youth League.

== Structure ==
The members of the All-China Youth Federation are representatives recommended by member organizations, elected through consultation, and specially invited representatives of young people. The highest authority of the All-China Youth Federation is the National Committee, and each term of office is 5 years. The National Committee has a chairman and a vice chairman. When the National Committee is not in session, the Standing Committee presides over the affairs of the meeting, and has a secretary-general and a deputy secretary-general. The All-China Youth Federation has a secretariat to take charge of daily affairs. The official publication of the All-China Youth Federation is Chinese Children, and it also has an internal work publication All-China Youth Federation Newsletter.

The All-China Youth Federation has the following institutions:

=== Secretariat working body ===
- Coordination Department
- Ethnic and Religious Affairs Department
- Culture and Sports Department
- Science and Technology Department
- Education Department
- Community Work Department
- Human Resources Development Department
- Hong Kong, Macao and Taiwan Friendship Department
- Overseas Scholars Affairs Department
- Returned Research Students Department
- International Department
- Tourism Department

The All-China Youth Federation Office is located in the United Front Work Department of the Central Committee of the Communist Youth League of China.

=== Working committees ===
- Science and Technology Working Committee
- Education Sector Working Committee
- Agriculture Sector Working Committee
- Social Sciences Working Committee
- Economic Sector Working Committee
- Financial Sector Working Committee
- Legal Sector Working Committee
- Cultural and Arts Working Committee
- Press, Publishing and New Media Sector Working Committee
- Sports Sector Working Committee
- Medical and Health Sector Working Committee
- Social Organizations and Social Intermediaries Working Committee
- Religious Sector Working Committee
- Overseas Scholars and Overseas Chinese Working Committee
- Skilled Talent Sector Working Committee
- Working Committee for Taiwan compatriots and Hong Kong and Macao special guests

== Membership ==
The All-China Youth Federation has 55 group members and more than 77,000 members of the Youth Federation at all levels. Among them, there are 19 national group members, including:

=== National Association Members ===
- Communist Youth League of China
- All-China Students' Federation
- National Association of YMCAs of China
- National Association of Young Women's Christian Associations of China
- China Young Entrepreneurs Association
- China Rural Youth Entrepreneurship Leaders Association
- China Association of Young Scientists and Technologists
- Capital Youth Editors and Journalists Association
- China Young Volunteers Association
- China Youth Entrepreneurship Promotion Association
- China Youth Research Association
- China Youth Work College Association
- China Youth New Media Association
- China Youth Crime Prevention Research Association
- China Youth Press Association
- China Youth Palace Association
- China Youth Development Foundation
- China Guanghua Science and Technology Foundation
- China Youth Entrepreneurship and Employment Foundation

=== Local group members ===
- Beijing Youth Federation
- Tianjin Youth Federation
- Hebei Youth Federation
- Shanxi Youth Federation
- Inner Mongolia Autonomous Region Youth Federation
- Liaoning Youth Federation
- Jilin Youth Federation
- Heilongjiang Youth Federation
- Shanghai Youth Federation
- Jiangsu Youth Federation
- Zhejiang Youth Federation
- Anhui Youth Federation
- Fujian Youth Federation
- Jiangxi Youth Federation
- Shandong Youth Federation
- Henan Youth Federation
- Hubei Youth Federation
- Hunan Youth Federation
- Guangdong Youth Federation
- Guangxi Zhuang Autonomous Region Youth Federation
- Hainan Youth Federation
- Chongqing Youth Federation
- Sichuan Youth Federation
- Guizhou Youth Federation
- Yunnan Youth Federation
- Tibet Autonomous Region Youth Federation
- Shaanxi Youth Federation
- Gansu Youth Federation
- Qinghai Youth Federation
- Ningxia Hui Autonomous Region Youth Federation
- Xinjiang Uygur Autonomous Region Youth Federation

=== Industry members ===
- National Civil Aviation Youth Federation
- Youth Federation of the Central Committee of the Chinese Communist Party
- Central State Organs Youth Federation
- National Youth Federation of Financial System
- Central Enterprise Youth Federation
