= Hu Jintao removal incident =

2022 Chinese political controversy

Hu Jintao's removal from the 20th National Congress of the Chinese Communist Party
- Left: Hu questioning Xi Jinping as he is escorted out Right: Li Zhanshu taking a file away from Hu as staff approaches
- Date: 22 October 2022
- Time: (Beijing Time)
- Venue: Great Hall of the People
- Location: Beijing, China
- Cause: Uncertain

Chinese name
- Simplified Chinese: 胡锦涛二十大离场事件
- Traditional Chinese: 胡錦濤二十大離場事件
Transcriptions
Standard Mandarin
- Hanyu Pinyin: Hújǐntāo èrshídà líchǎng shìjiàn

On 22 October 2022, Hu Jintao, former general secretary of the Chinese Communist Party (2002–2012), was unexpectedly escorted out of the closing ceremony of the 20th National Congress of the Chinese Communist Party. He was pulled from his seat by two men following the instructions of the incumbent general secretary, Xi Jinping.

As international media had already entered the Great Hall of the People at the time of the incident, the event quickly became the focus of global news coverage.

== Process ==
In the middle of the closing meeting (after the three personnel votes ended and the media entered the venue), according to the photos taken by reporters from ABC and the videos taken by reporters from Channel NewsAsia, Hu Jintao, a member of the Standing Committee of the Presidium of the 20th National Congress of the Chinese Communist Party, wanted to check the documents on his table. For unknown reasons, Li Zhanshu and Wang Huning, allies of incumbent Party General Secretary Xi Jinping, blocked the documents beside the red ballot folder, and then took the documents away from Hu.

According to the lip-language analysis of an anonymous Taiwanese political expert, Li said to Hu: "Don't look at it, it's all decided". This also attracted the attention of Xi Jinping, who was next to Hu. After Xi signaled, according to the scene footage taken by reporters from The Straits Times, Agence France-Presse, Associated Press, and other media, Director of the Secretariat of the General Office of the CCP Kong Shaoxun, and Xi's personal bodyguards came one after another, intending to take Hu away. Hu appeared unwilling to leave.

The two sides were deadlocked for about a minute and a half. During this period, Hu repeatedly tried to get the ballot folder and documents back but failed. He also tried to open the document beside Xi but it was held down by Xi himself. Hu was pulled up by the staff, and before he left his seat, the documents were also handed over to the bodyguards to take away. Finally, Hu capitulated. Before leaving, he said a few words to Xi. Xi responded briefly. At the same time, Hu patted Li Keqiang, the Premier of China and a key figure of Hu's faction Tuanpai, who was sitting on Xi's right. No other Politburo member at the front row visibly reacted to Hu's removal. About half an hour later, Kong Shaoxun returned to Xi and left after a brief conversation.

The incident occurred before the congressional voting on the report of the 19th Central Committee, the work report of the 19th Central Commission for Discipline Inspection, and an amendment to the CCP constitution. Hu was absent from the voting due to this incident. Subsequent official voting results showed that all proposals passed unanimously with no abstentions or negative votes. The 20th Central Committee was also elected on the same day. Xi Jinping and Wang Huning were among the members of the new Central Committee while Li Keqiang, Li Zhanshu, and Wang Yang were not.

== Media coverage ==
=== World ===
CNN reported that Hu left reluctantly. Foreign Policy wrote: "Around 2013, China watchers began to joke about the 'golden age of liberalism under Hu Jintao'. At the time, it seemed absurd that an era so politically conservative, even as civil society slowly and falteringly advanced, could be considered in that way. Over the next decade, it became far less of a joke."

Kenji Minamura, a longtime Asahi Shimbun journalist, published a series of articles on the matter in Yūkan Fuji Magazine of Sankei Shimbun. One of them, on 4 November, quoted an anonymous U.S. government official saying that on the morning of that day, Hu was informed that the number of Politburo members had been reduced from 25 to 24, and the one who had been reduced was vice-premier Hu Chunhua, a protege of Hu Jintao.

The Economist said that while it is possible the act was deliberate, it was more likely that Hu was not feeling well, saying that the event "looked consistent with a sudden episode of mental confusion". Jude Blanchette, an expert at the Center for Strategic and International Studies, said that the event "didn't have the stage-managed feel of an orchestrated purge", while Bill Bishop, a China expert, noted that the China Central Television would likely not show Hu during the news footage of the event if he was purged. Chris Buckley, writing for The New York Times, said that Hu being ill was more likely than theories of him protesting against Xi.

James Palmer, a deputy editor at Foreign Policy, interpreted the incident to have been political, suggesting that it could have been Xi's intention to "deliberately and publicly humiliate his predecessor." Xi had been harshly critical in his previous speeches, speaking of "the problem that the party's leadership had been weakened, blurred, diluted, and marginalized" before his leadership. Xi said in his report:

Ten years ago ... There were many problems of having a vague understanding of upholding the party's leadership and lack of action, and there were many problems of weakening, falsifying, and diluting the implementation of the party's leadership, and some party members and cadres had shaken their political beliefs ... some people lacked confidence in the socialist political system with Chinese characteristics ... money worship and hedonism, wrong thoughts such as extreme individualism and historical nihilism appeared from time to time, and online public sphere was chaotic, which seriously affected people's thinking and social public opinion environment ... there were many weaknesses in the modernization of national defense and the military; the institutional mechanisms for implementing "one country, two systems" in Hong Kong and Macau was not perfect; national security was facing severe challenges, and so on. At that time, many people in the party and society were worried about the future of the party and the country.

=== China state media ===
China's state-run Xinhua News Agency reported on Twitter that Hu had been determined to attend despite undergoing recuperation and that: "When [Hu] was not feeling well during the session, his staff, for his health, accompanied him to a room next to the meeting venue for a rest. Now, he is much better."

The incident was not broadcast in China, and both Hu's name and that of his son, politician Hu Haifeng, were blocked online by Chinese censors. Academics Steve Tsang and Olivia Cheung write that the ban on images and reporting of the incident suggests that Xi did not intend to humiliate Hu.

== Aftermath ==
Hu appeared in public alongside Xi on 5 December 2022, attending the state funeral for Jiang Zemin, former General Secretary of the CCP (1989–2002), before his body was cremated in Babaoshan Revolutionary Cemetery. After the death of Li Keqiang a year later, Hu had offered condolences, but was not present at the ceremonies.

== See also ==
- Xi Jinping faction
- Hu Jintao faction
