= Central Committee of the Communist Youth League of China =

Central Committee of the Communist Youth League of China 中国共产主义青年团中央委员会

Overview
- Type: Political-executive organ
- Elected by: National Congress
- Length of term: Five years
- Term limits: None

Leadership
- General Secretary: A Dong, First Secretary of the Secretariat
- Executive organ: Standing Committee

Members
- Total: 200

Alternates
- Total: 120

Meeting place
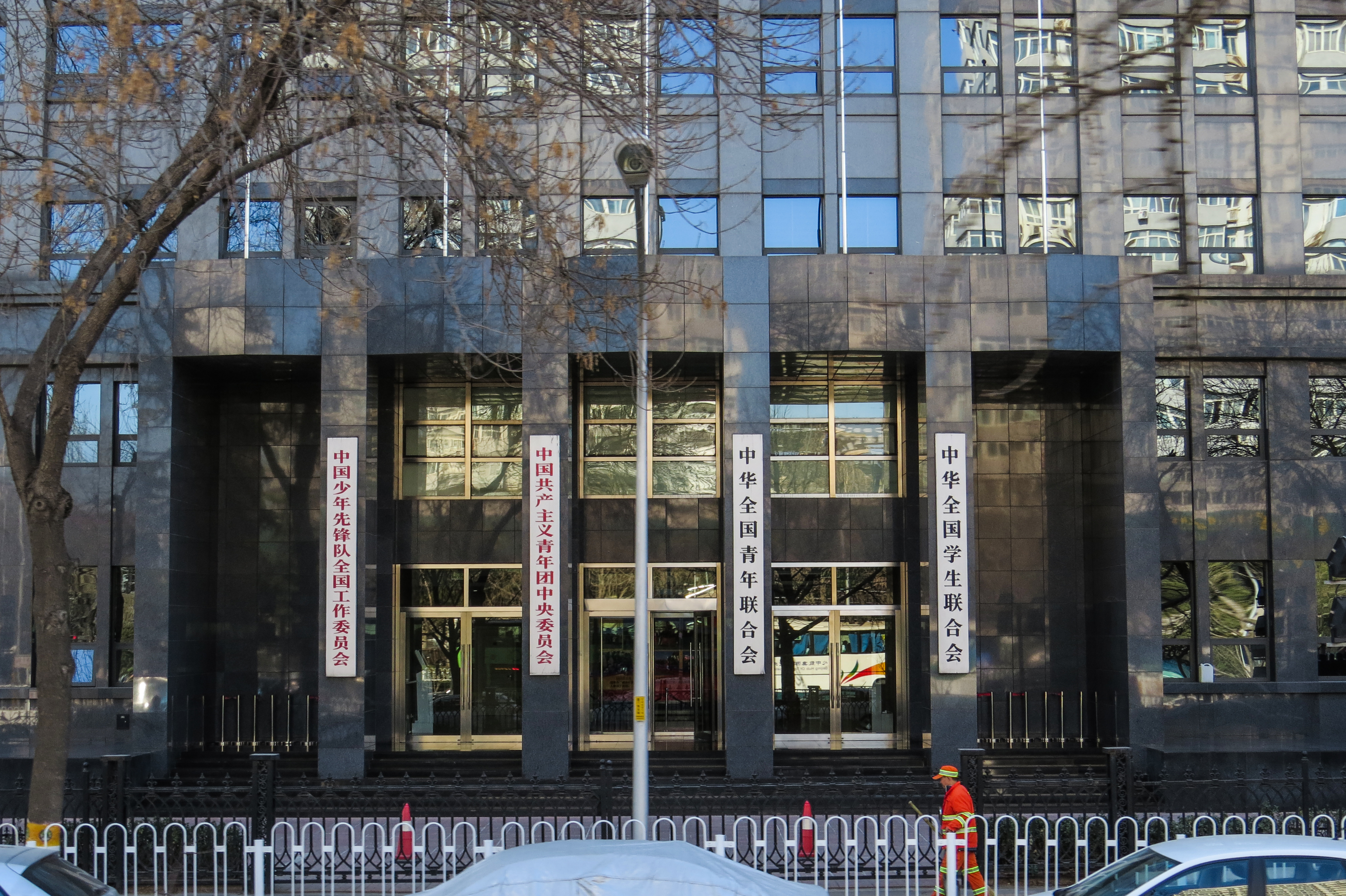
- Headquarters, Beijing

Constitution
- Constitution of the Communist Youth League of China

Regulation
- Regulation on the Work of the Central Committee of the Communist Youth League of China

Central Committee of the Communist Youth League of China
- Simplified Chinese: 中国共产主义青年团中央委员会
- Traditional Chinese: 中國共產主義青年團中央委員會
Transcriptions
Standard Mandarin
- Hanyu Pinyin: Zhōngguó Gòngchǎnzhǔyì Qīngniántuán Zhōngyāng Wěiyuánhuì

Abbreviation
- Simplified Chinese: 共青团中央
- Traditional Chinese: 共青團中央
Transcriptions
Standard Mandarin
- Hanyu Pinyin: Gòngqīngtuán Zhōngyāng

Alternative abbreviation
- Simplified Chinese: 团中央
- Traditional Chinese: 團中央
Transcriptions
Standard Mandarin
- Hanyu Pinyin: Tuán Zhōngyāng

The Central Committee of the Communist Youth League of China is the highest organ when the national congress is not in session and is tasked with carrying out congress resolutions, directing all party work, and representing the Communist Youth League of China (CYLC) externally. It is led by the Central Committee of the Chinese Communist Party and elected by the League's National Congress.

The National Congress of the CYLC is held every five years and is convened by the Central Committee. During the recess of the National Congress, the Central Committee implements the resolutions of the National Congress and leads all the work of the League. The plenary session of the Central Committee of the CYLC elects several standing members to form the Standing Committee. It elects one first secretary and several secretaries to form the Secretariat. The plenary session of the Central Committee is convened by the Standing Committee and is held at least once a year. During the adjournment of the plenary session of the Central Committee and the Standing Committee, the Secretariat exercises the functions and powers of the Central Committee.

== Function ==
The CYLC Central Committee implements the resolutions of the National Congress and exercises leadership over all the work of the League when the Congress is not in session. It meets at least once a year for plenums.

== Structure ==
The CYLC Central Committee is led by the Central Committee of the Chinese Communist Party. The CYLC Central Committee is elected by the National Congress. It is composed of 200 representatives and 120 alternates. CYLC secretaries from Tsinghua University and Peking University are automatically members of the Central Committee. The Central Committee in turn elects a Secretariat, which is the organization’s main decision-making body.

The CYLC Central Committee's newspaper is the China Youth Daily. In December 2013, the Central Committee launched a Weibo and WeChat account.
