= Shi Yugang =

Chinese politician (born 1965)

- 石玉钢

Deputy Communist Party Secretary of Yunnan
- Incumbent
- Assumed office November 2021
- Preceded by: Li Xiaosan

Personal details
- Born: July 1965 (age 61) Fenghuang County, Hunan, China
- Party: Chinese Communist Party
- Education: Minzu University of China

Chinese name
- Simplified Chinese: 石玉钢
- Traditional Chinese: 石玉鋼
Transcriptions
Standard Mandarin
- Hanyu Pinyin: Shí Yùgāng

Shi Yugang (Chinese: 石玉钢; born July 1965) is a Chinese politician of Miao ethnicity who is the current deputy party secretary of Yunnan, in office since November 2021.

He was a representative of the 19th National Congress of the Chinese Communist Party and is a representative of the 20th National Congress of the Chinese Communist Party. He is an alternate of the 20th Central Committee of the Chinese Communist Party.

== Biography ==
Shi was born in Fenghuang County, Hunan, in July 1965. In 1982, he entered the Minzu University of China, where he majored in Chinese history. He joined the Chinese Communist Party (CCP) in June 1996.

After graduating in 1989, Shi was assigned to the State Ethnic Affairs Commission, where he eventually becoming deputy director in 2017.

In September 2018, Shi was transferred to northeast China's Jilin province and appointed vice governor. A year later, he was appointed head of Publicity Department and was admitted to member of the Standing Committee of the CCP Jilin Provincial Committee, the province's top authority.

He was made deputy party secretary of Yunnan in November 2021, in addition to serving as president of the Party School.

Party political offices
Preceded by Wang Xiaoping	Head of Publicity Department of Jilin Provincial Committee of the Chinese Communist Party; 2019–2021	Succeeded by A Dong
Preceded by Li Xiaosan	Deputy Communist Party Secretary of Yunnan; 2021–	Incumbent
