= Zhou Qiang =

Chinese politician

- 周强
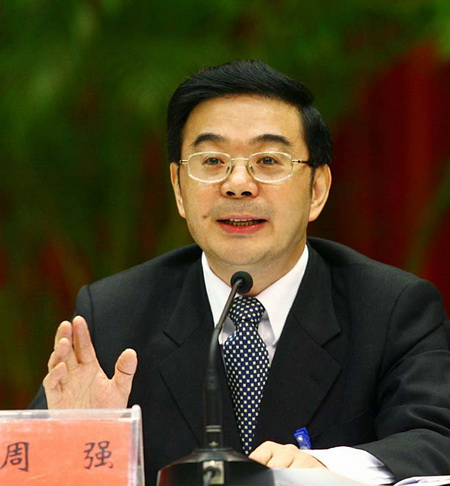

Vice Chairman of the Chinese People's Political Consultative Conference
- Incumbent
- Assumed office 10 March 2023
- Chairman: Wang Huning

President of the Supreme People's Court
- In office 15 March 2013 – 11 March 2023
- Deputy: Shen Deyong
- Preceded by: Wang Shengjun
- Succeeded by: Zhang Jun

Party Secretary of Hunan
- In office 25 April 2010 – 20 March 2013
- Deputy: Xu Shousheng (governor)
- Preceded by: Zhang Chunxian
- Succeeded by: Xu Shousheng

First Secretary of the Communist Youth League of China
- In office 25 June 1998 – 6 November 2006
- Preceded by: Li Keqiang
- Succeeded by: Hu Chunhua

Personal details
- Born: 25 April 1960 (age 66) Huangmei County, Hubei, People's Republic of China
- Party: Chinese Communist Party (1983–present)
- Relations: Zhou Jun {MEE
- Education: Southwest University of Political Science & Law

Zhou Qiang
- Simplified Chinese: 周强
- Traditional Chinese: 周強
Transcriptions
Standard Mandarin
- Hanyu Pinyin: Zhōu Qiáng
- IPA: [ʈʂóʊ tɕʰjǎŋ]

Zhou Qiang (Chinese: 周强; pinyin: Zhōu Qiáng; born 25 April 1960) is a Chinese politician who is a vice chairman of the Chinese People's Political Consultative Conference.

Previously, he served as the secretary of the Chinese Communist Party's Hunan committee, the effective head of the province of Hunan. He served as the province's governor between 2007 and 2010. Zhou also served as the First Secretary of the Communist Youth League of China between 1998 and 2006. Between 2018 and 2023, he served as the president of the Supreme People's Court.

== Life and career ==
Born in Huangmei County, Hubei Province, Zhou grew up during the Cultural Revolution. In 1978, he was part of the first batch of students admitted through the National College Entrance Examinations to the Southwest University of Political Science & Law. Zhou obtained a master's degree in law in 1986. He joined the Chinese Communist Party (CCP) during his studies, in 1983.

In November 1995, he was elected secretary of the central secretariat of the Chinese Communist Youth League (CYL) at the 4th plenary session of the 13th CYL central committee. In June 1998, he was elevated to first secretary of the CYL central secretariat, and was re-elected in July 2003.

In February 2007, Zhou was appointed governor of Hunan, after a five-month period that saw him made a standing committee member and vice secretary of the CCP Hunan committee (September 3), and then acting governor of Hunan (September 30), appointed by the standing committee of the 10th Hunan People's Congress; he resigned as first secretary of the central secretariat of the CYL in December. He was re-elected governor of Hunan on January 24, 2008.

On April 25, 2010, Zhou, then aged 50, was appointed Party Secretary of Hunan, becoming one of the youngest provincial party chiefs in the country. His rise to power is comparable to that of then-Party general secretary Hu Jintao and then-Vice-Premier Li Keqiang; all three men had background in the Communist Youth League of China.

=== President of the Supreme People's Court ===
In March 2013, the NPC installed Zhou as the president of the Supreme People's Court.

Like other top Chinese leaders, Zhou spoke often of promoting the 'rule of law' and was thought to be aligned with CCP general secretary Xi Jinping's stated ambition to make the court system in China fairer. Indeed, in his first few years in office, Zhou overturned several court decisions as unjust, including the wrongful execution of Nie Shubin in 1995; granted judges more independence; and restricted local officials' influence over court rulings, although ultimately courts at all levels had to answer to the party leadership.

But in 2017, speaking at a Supreme People's Court meeting on January 14, Zhou warned the courts against the 'idea of judicial independence'. He said:

[China's courts] must firmly resist the western idea of "constitutional democracy", "separation of powers" and "judicial independence". These are erroneous western notions that threaten the leadership of the ruling Communist Party and defame the Chinese socialist path on the rule of law. We have to raise our flag and show our sword to struggle against such thoughts. We must not fall into the trap of western thoughts and judicial independence. We must stay firm on the Chinese socialist path on the rule of law.

This tougher line was interpreted as self-protection amid a CCP power struggle ahead of the 19th National Congress of the Chinese Communist Party.

Zhou was a member of the 16th, 17th, 18th and 19th Central Committees of the CCP.

Legal offices
| Preceded by Wang Shengjun | President of the Supreme People's Court; 2013–present | Incumbent |
Party political offices
| Preceded by Li Keqiang | First Secretary of the Communist Youth League of China; 1998–2006 | Succeeded by Hu Chunhua |
| Preceded by Zhang Chunxian | Party Secretary of Hunan; 2010–2013 | Succeeded by Xu Shousheng |
Government offices
| Preceded by Zhou Bohua | Governor of Hunan; 2006–2010 | Succeeded by Xu Shousheng |
