= First Secretary of the Communist Youth League of China =

Government position in China

First Secretary of the Secretariat of the Central Committee of the Communist Youth League of China
- 中国共产主义青年团中央委员会书记处第一书记
- Emblem of the Communist Youth League of China

- Flag of the Communist Youth League of China
- Incumbent; A Dong since May 31, 2023
- Secretariat of the Central Committee of the Communist Youth League of China
- Type: Youth league leader
- Status: Provincial and ministerial-level official
- Member of: Secretariat
- Seat: Beijing
- Nominator: Central Committee
- Appointer: Central Committee
- Inaugural holder: Yu Xiusong
- Formation: 1920
- Deputy: Secretaries of the Secretariat

The first secretary of the Secretariat of the Central Committee of the Communist Youth League of China is the leader of the Communist Youth League of China (CYLC). The first secretary heads the Secretariat of the Central Committee. The Central Committee elects one first secretary and several secretaries to form the Secretariat, which handles the day-to-day affairs of the CYLC. The first secretary also serves ex officio as the president of the China Youth University of Political Studies.

== List of secretaries ==
No.	Officeholder	Term of office		Ref.
No.	Officeholder	Took office	Left office	Ref.
1	Yu Xiusong (1899–1939)	1920	1922	
2	Shi Cuntong (1899–1970)	1922	1925	
3	Zhang Tailei (1898–1927)	1925	1927	
4	Ren Bishi (1906–1985)	1927	1928	
5	Guan Xiangying (1902–1946)	1928	1946	
6	Feng Wenbin (1911–1997)	1949	1953	
7	Hu Yaobang (1915–1989)	1953	1966	
8	Han Ying (born 1935)	27 October 1978	30 November 1982	
9	Wang Zhaoguo (born 1941)	December 1982	December 1984	
10	Hu Jintao (born 1942)	14 December 1984	8 July 1985	
11	Song Defu (1946–2007)	November 1985	May 1993	
12	Li Keqiang (1955–2023)	10 May 1993	23 June 1998	
13	Zhou Qiang (born 1960)	25 June 1998	6 November 2006	
14	Hu Chunhua (born 1963)	November 2006	April 2008	
15	Lu Hao (born 1967)	April 2008	March 2013	
16	Qin Yizhi (born 1965)	19 March 2013	20 September 2017	
17	He Junke (born 1969)	29 June 2018	31 May 2023	
18	A Dong (born 1970)	31 May 2023	Incumbent	
