= Lu Hao (politician, born 1967) =

Chinese politician

- 陆昊

Party Branch Secretary and Director of the Development Research Center of the State Council
- Incumbent
- Assumed office 8 July 2022
- Premier: Li Keqiang; Li Qiang
- Preceded by: Ma Jiantang

Minister of Natural Resources
- In office 19 March 2018 – 24 June 2022
- Premier: Li Keqiang
- Preceded by: Jiang Daming (as Minister of Land and Resources)
- Succeeded by: Wang Guanghua

Governor of Heilongjiang
- In office 25 March 2013 – 26 March 2018
- Preceded by: Wang Xiankui
- Succeeded by: Wang Wentao

First Secretary of the Communist Youth League of China
- In office April 2008 – March 2013
- Preceded by: Hu Chunhua
- Succeeded by: Qin Yizhi

Personal details
- Born: 21 June 1967 (age 59) Xi'an, Shaanxi, China
- Party: Chinese Communist Party (1985–present)
- Education: Peking University

Chinese name
- Simplified Chinese: 陆昊
- Traditional Chinese: 陸昊
Transcriptions
Standard Mandarin
- Hanyu Pinyin: Lù Hào

Lu Hao (Chinese: 陆昊; pinyin: Lù Hào; born 21 June 1967) is a Chinese economist and politician, serving as party branch secretary and director of the Development Research Center of the State Council since June 2022. Previously, he was the head of the Ministry of Natural Resources, and the youngest provincial governor in China, as the Governor of Heilongjiang from 2013 to 2018. Lu has also served as the first secretary of the Communist Youth League, and vice-mayor of Beijing.

== Early life and education ==
Lu was born in Xi'an, but traces his ancestry to Shanghai (some sources say he was born in Shanghai). His father was a university professor. Lu was an only child. He attended Xi'an No. 85 High School. In high school, Lu played volleyball and was captain of the school team for three years in a row. In school, his favourite subjects were history and politics. He consistently ranked as one of the top three students in his classes.

Lu joined the Chinese Communist Party in 1985 at 18 years of age. Due to his high grades, he was guaranteed entrance to the School of Economics and Management at Peking University. He was soon involved in student politics, and at age 20 was elected the head of the university student union, becoming the first student union president elected by popular vote since the Cultural Revolution. In early 1989, he gained admittance without sitting an exam to pursue graduate studies in economics at Peking University.

While in graduate school, Lu worked under the direction of renowned Chinese economic Li Yining, who also taught Li Keqiang and Li Yuanchao. Lu also worked part-time as assistant to the manager of a wool production plant. In 1994, he earned his Master's degree in economics and just a year later, he was promoted general manager of the Beijing Wool Factory, directing the work of some 5,000 employees. While leading the plant, Lu shuttled between Xi'an and Beijing trying to win further business. He streamlined operations and increased revenue, turning the plant into a profit-generating business; the plant would eventually converted into a corporation. In 1998, he was named one of the "Ten Outstanding Youth of Beijing" for his work at the wool factory, and was received by then Premier Zhu Rongji.

== Political career ==
Lu became head of the Zhongguancun Administrative Office in 1999, beginning his career in public administration. The Zhongguancun area of Beijing was known as "China's Silicon Valley", rich in start-up technology companies. In February 2003, he began working part-time as assistant to the chief executive of the Three Gorges Dam project. In January 2003, Lu was named vice mayor of Beijing, overseeing the city's Industry Work Commission and Economic Commission, overseeing the broad portfolios of state assets supervision, industry, and information technology.

In May 2008, Lu was named First Secretary of the Communist Youth League. He also served ex officio as the president of the China Youth University of Political Studies. Prior to Lu, various political heavyweights, including former party leaders Hu Yaobang and Hu Jintao, and Premier Li Keqiang, had served in this position. At age 40, Lu became the youngest provincial-ministerial level official in the country.

In 2009, Lu in his capacity as a member of the CPC Central Committee attended the 18th Congress of the Communist Party of Greece and personally met with its leader, Aleka Papariga.

He was appointed acting governor of Heilongjiang on March 25, 2013, replacing Wang Xiankui, who had been promoted to Heilongjiang party chief. Lu was then elected as governor on June 5, 2013, during the second session of the 12th Heilongjiang Provincial People's Congress.

In 2012, Lu became the youngest full member of the 18th Central Committee of the Chinese Communist Party. In 2017 he remained the youngest full member of the 19th Central Committee of the Chinese Communist Party.

In March 2018 he was made Minister of Natural Resources in the central government.

In June 2022, he was appointed party branch secretary of Development Research Center of the State Council, succeeding Ma Jiantang.

Party political offices
Preceded by Hu Chunhua	First Secretary of the Communist Youth League of China; 2008–2013	Succeeded by Qin Yizhi
Preceded by Ma Jiantang	Party Branch Secretary of Development Research Center of the State Council; 2022–present	Incumbent
Government offices
Preceded by Wang Xiankui	Governor of Heilongjiang; 2013–2018	Succeeded by Wang Wentao
New title	Minister of Natural Resources of China; 2018–present	Succeeded by Wang Guanghua
New title	Chief Inspector of the National Natural Resources; 2018–2022	Succeeded by Wang Guanghua
