= Qin Yizhi =

Chinese politician

- 秦宜智

First Secretary of the Communist Youth League of China
- In office March 2013 – September 2017
- Preceded by: Lu Hao
- Succeeded by: He Junke (from June 2018)

Personal details
- Born: 12 December 1965 (age 59); Xinxiang, Henan
- Political party: Chinese Communist Party

Qin Yizhi (Chinese: 秦宜智; born 12 December 1965) is a Chinese politician, best known for his term as First Secretary of the Communist Youth League of China.

== Biography ==
Qin was born in Xinxiang, Henan province. Qin graduated from Tsinghua University and has an engineering master's degree from Chongqing University. In December 2001, he became mayor of Panzhihua, later he became party chief of Neijiang. In May 2005 he was transferred to serve as assistant to the Chairman of the Tibet Autonomous Region (TAR). In July 2006, he was named Vice Chairman of the TAR. In September 2006, he became party chief of the regional capital Lhasa, and in 2008 joined the provincial CCP Standing Committee. In November 2012 he was named an alternate of the 18th Central Committee of the Chinese Communist Party.

On March 19, 2013, Qin became First Secretary of the Communist Youth League, succeeding Lu Hao. As head of the Youth League, Qin was, ex officio, the president of the China Youth University of Political Studies, and also held the rank equivalent to a cabinet minister.

On September 20, 2017, Qin was appointed as deputy director of the General Administration of Quality Supervision, Inspection and Quarantine (minister-level). The move was seen as a demotion, taking place only days after it was revealed that Qin did not even get elected as an ordinary delegate to the 19th Party Congress. It also decisively broke with the mold of a long line of Communist Youth League chiefs who soared to higher office later on in their careers. Six months later, he was appointed as a deputy director of the State Administration for Market Regulation.

On June 28, 2023, Qin was appointed as a full-time member of the National Ethnic Affairs Commission.

Party political offices
Preceded by Lu Hao	First Secretary of the Communist Youth League of China; 2013–2017	Succeeded by He Junke
Preceded by Gongpo Tashi	Party Secretary of Lhasa; 2006–2011	Succeeded by Che Dalha
