= A Dong =

Chinese politician

- 阿东

First Secretary of the Communist Youth League of China
- Incumbent
- Assumed office 31 May 2023
- General Secretary: Xi Jinping
- Preceded by: He Junke

Head of the Publicity Department of the CCP Jilin Provincial Committee
- In office 28 December 2021 – 31 May 2023
- Party Secretary: Jing Junhai
- Preceded by: Shi Yugang
- Succeeded by: Cao Lubao

Personal details
- Born: November 1970 (age 55) Haicheng, Liaoning, China
- Party: Chinese Communist Party
- Education: Liaoning Normal University; Peking University

Chinese name
- Traditional Chinese: 阿東
- Simplified Chinese: 阿东
Transcriptions
Standard Mandarin
- Hanyu Pinyin: Ā Dōng

A Dong (Chinese: 阿东; born November 1970) is a Chinese politician who is currently serving as the First Secretary of the Communist Youth League of China. Previously, he served as the head of the Publicity Department of the Jilin Provincial Committee of the Chinese Communist Party.

== Biography ==
A Dong was born in Haicheng, Liaoning, and is of Hui ethnicity. He studied human geography at Peking University's College of Urban and Environmental Sciences and obtained a doctoral degree in the discipline in 1997.

After leaving school, A Dong worked at the State Oceanic Administration for 19 years. He rose through the ranks, eventually becoming a bureau head in the administration.

In August 2016, he was sent to Sansha, Hainan to serve as the city's specifically designated deputy Communist Party secretary. He served as the mayor of Sansha from 2017 to 2018 and was then transferred to Sanya, Hainan to serve as mayor, serving in that role until 2020.

In April 2020, A Dong was transferred to Jilin and appointed as vice governor. He was elevated to become a member of the standing committee of the Jilin Provincial Committee of the CCP in December 2021 and was appointed as the head of the Publicity Department of the provincial CCP committee.

In May 2023, A Dong was appointed as the First Secretary of the Communist Youth League of China. At age 52, he was the youngest incumbent ministerial-level leader at the time of his appointment.

Party political offices
Preceded by He Junke	First Secretary of the Communist Youth League of China; 2023–	Incumbent
Preceded by Shi Yugang	Head of the Publicity Department of the CCP Jilin Provincial Committee; 2021–2023	Succeeded by Cao Lubao
