= Communist Youth League of China =

Youth division of the Chinese Communist Party

Communist Youth League of China 中国共产主义青年团

- Leader: A Dong
- Founded: 5 May 1922; 104 years ago (official)
- Headquarters: No. 10, Qianmen Dongdajie, Beijing
- Membership: 78,336,000
- Ideology: Communism; Marxism-Leninism; Socialism with Chinese characteristics
- Mother party: Chinese Communist Party
- International affiliation: Young Communist International (historical); World Federation of Democratic Youth (historical)
- Newspaper: China Youth Daily
- Website: www.gqt.org.cn

Communist Youth League of China
- Simplified Chinese: 中国共产主义青年团
- Traditional Chinese: 中國共產主義青年團
- Literal meaning: Communist Youth League of China
Transcriptions
Standard Mandarin
- Hanyu Pinyin: Zhōngguó Gòngchǎnzhǔyì Qīngniántuán
- Wade–Giles: Chung^{1}-kuo^{2} Kung^{4}-ch'an^{3}-chu^{4}-i^{4} Ch'ing^{1}-nien^{2}-t'uan^{2}

Abbreviation
- Simplified Chinese: 共青团
- Traditional Chinese: 共青團
- Literal meaning: Communist Youth League
Transcriptions
Standard Mandarin
- Hanyu Pinyin: Gòngqīngtuán
- Wade–Giles: Kung^{4}-ch'ing^{1}-t'uan^{2}

Original name
- Simplified Chinese: 中国社会主义青年团
- Traditional Chinese: 中國社會主義青年團
- Literal meaning: Socialist Youth League of China
Transcriptions
Standard Mandarin
- Hanyu Pinyin: Zhōngguó Shèhuìzhǔyì Qīngniántuán
- Wade–Giles: Chung^{1}-kuo^{2} She^{4}-hui^{4}-chu^{3}-i^{4} Ch'ing^{1}-nien^{2}-t'uan^{2}

Wartime name
- Simplified Chinese: 中国新民主主义青年团
- Traditional Chinese: 中國新民主主義青年團
- Literal meaning: China New Democracy Youth League
Transcriptions
Standard Mandarin
- Hanyu Pinyin: Zhōngguó Xīn Mínzhǔzhǔyì Qīngniántuán
- Wade–Giles: Chung^{1}-kuo^{2} Hsin^{1} Min^{2}-chu^{3}-chu^{3}-i^{4} Ch'ing^{1}-nien^{2}-t'uan^{2}

The Communist Youth League of China (CYLC; also known as the Young Communist League of China or simply the Communist Youth League or CYL) is a people's organization in the People's Republic of China for youth between the ages of 14 and 28, run by the Chinese Communist Party (CCP).

The predecessor of the CYLC, the Shanghai Socialist Youth League, was founded in August 1920 by Chen Duxiu and Li Dazhao. Its national organization, the Socialist Youth League of China, was founded in 1922, initially under the command and financial backing of the Communist International. In January 1925, it was renamed to the Chinese Communist Youth League. During the Second Sino-Japanese War, it assisted the Second United Front. In November 1936, the Communist Youth League was reorganized into the Youth National Salvation Association. After the CCP won the Chinese Civil War, the CCP Central Committee announced the re-establishment of the Chinese New Democracy Youth League which changed its name to the Communist Youth League of China in 1957.

The league is organized in a pattern similar to the CCP. Its highest body is the National Congress held every five years, and when the National Congress is not in session, the Central Committee serves as the core power body. However, as the Central Committee usually only holds one meeting a year, most of the powers and work are controlled by the Standing Committee of the Central Committee and the Central Secretariat. The CYCL's leader is its First Secretary, who is an alternate member of the Central Committee of the CCP. The incumbent First Secretary is A Dong, appointed in May 2023. The Communist Youth League is also responsible for guiding the activities of the Young Pioneers (for children below the age of 14).

As of December 2025, there were 78.336 million Communist Youth League members. CYLC was historically seen as a vehicle that could promote the future careers of CCP officials, with these officials being collectively named the Tuanpai, also known as the Youth League Faction. Though prominent Youth League officials have held important posts within the CCP, most notably CCP general secretary Hu Jintao, the influence of the CYLC has decreased under CCP general secretary Xi Jinping.

== History ==
=== Early history ===
The first local organizations of the league were established in May 1920 prior to the establishment of the Chinese Communist Party (CCP) itself. The predecessor of the CYLC, the Shanghai Socialist Youth League, was founded in August 1920 by Chen Duxiu and Li Dazhao. In May 1922, the 1st National Congress (traditional Chinese: 全國代表大會; simplified Chinese: 全国代表大会; pinyin: Quánguó Dàibiǎo Dàhuì) of the League was led by the CCP, and therefore became a unified organization in China named the Socialist Youth League of China (社会主义青年团). It was initially under the command and financial backing of the Communist International. In the 3rd Party National Congress in January 1925, the Chinese Socialist Youth League was renamed as the Chinese Communist Youth League. During the Second Sino-Japanese War, it assisted the Second United Front. In November 1936, the Communist Youth League was reorganized into the Youth National Salvation Association. After the Second Sino-Japanese War, in order to adapt to the new social and political situation, it was officially renamed as the Chinese New Democracy Youth League (新民主主义青年团) in April 1949.

=== Mao Zedong era ===
Prior to the Cultural Revolution, the CYLC was a major mass organization which had an important role in political mobilization and implementing party-state policies. Shortly before Mao Zedong declared the formation of the People’s Republic of China, the New Democratic Youth League was created in April 1949. In the early years of Mao’s leadership, a majority of the new Chinese Communist Party (CCP) members were consequently members of the League. In 1956, 17% of China’s youth population was involved, estimated to be around 20 million people. In May 1957, its name as the Chinese Communist Youth League was resumed, historically combining the congresses of all three leagues (the Chinese Socialist Youth League, the Chinese Communist Youth League as well as the Chinese New Democracy Youth League).

During this period, the Communist Youth League of China was tied to the state heavily and followed the CCP’s leadership. In the 1956 CCP Constitution, the CYLC is mentioned as a way for the youth of China to learn about communism and to participate in the revolution. The main goal of both the CCP and the CYLC at this time was to increase membership, particularly in the rural and working-classes of China. The CYLC’s 1964 Constitution made the process of joining easier which increased member count. In 1966, the League boasted 40 million members.

From 1949 to 1966, the CYLC's goal was to integrate Maoist thinking in all aspects of the organization. The League’s journal (China Youth Daily) published educational materials about communism geared towards the youth. In 1963, an estimated 1.5 million copies were sold. The CYLC also had connections to the People’s Liberation Army; many former members of the League would join the PLA and the CCP. A branch of the CYLC called the Young Pioneers prepared youth aged 9 to 15 for their future enrollment in the Youth League and the CCP.

During the Cultural Revolution, the CYLC was accused of revisionism and stopped operating in 1966. Various local CYLC operations began resuming after the end of the Cultural Revolution and the CYLC resumed national operations in 1978.

=== Reform and opening up ===
Following the Mao era, the CYLC has been a major path to CCP membership. This became especially true after the 1982 establishment of the "Recommendation of Outstanding CYL Members" system, which emphasized that those under the age of 28 who wish to join the CCP should be recommended by the CYLC.

In 1988, reformist Chinese policymakers proposed a project to loosen CCP control of the CYLC and make the organization more independent. However, CCP leadership set aside the reform proposal following the 1989 Tiananmen Square protests and massacre.

In an attempt to increase the relevance of the CYLC and make it more "responsive", the CYLC diversified its activities, beginning to organize classes for CCP applicants and hosting leisure activities in addition to the CYLC's political activities. Along with university student unions, the CYLC began hosting on-campus cultural activities like singing, poetry, and sports competitions. In 1989, the CYLC's central body organized a national "challenge cup" science competition, which was later also adopted by various universities.

After Tiananmen, community service activities expanded in the 1990s. In 1993, the CYLC started The Young Volunteers Operation. Through this program, the CYLC has channeled millions of volunteers into poverty alleviation, educational assistance, and environmental protection projects. The CYLC has also mobilized university student volunteers to participate in the China Youth Development Foundation's Project Hope, which focuses on educational assistance to primary school children in China's least developed regions.

In 2003, the CYLC started the “plan for university graduates voluntary service to the West” (daxuesheng zhiyuan fuwu xibu jihua, 大学生志愿服务 西部计划) as part of its effort to promote volunteer service. If accepted into the program after passing an exam, university graduates work for three years in underdeveloped parts of western China.

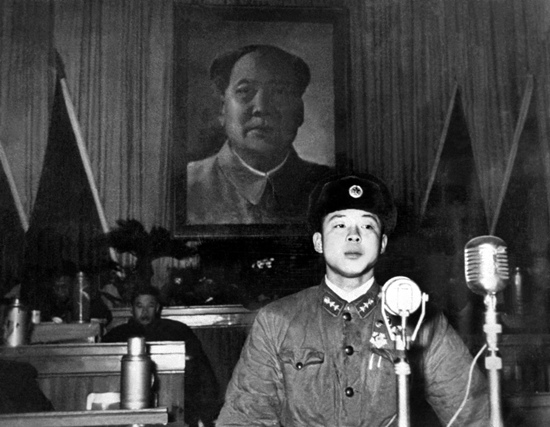
Lei Feng speaks at the Communist League conference in February 1962

The Communist Youth League has contributed a number of top echelon leaders of the CCP-led government of the People's Republic of China. The proliferation of leaders with a Youth League background has led to the informal name "Tuanpai" (abbreviation for "Youth League faction") being used to describe certain members of the leadership at different times. The first "Youth League faction" was represented by Hu Yaobang. The second "Youth League faction" is represented by Hu Jintao. While there is no direct political lineage between the two Hus, Hu Jintao's administration formally elevated the memory of the earlier Hu. In 2005, the 90th anniversary of Hu Yaobang's birth, a new museum and a series of commemorative books and television programs were launched. During the Hu Jintao era, CYLC membership expanded as the organization recruited broadly.

During the 2008 Summer Olympics in Beijing, the CYLC mobilized 1.7 million volunteers to assist with the Olympics.

The death of the son of Ling Jihua and Gu Liping, a couple associated with the Communist Youth League, may have tarnished the reputation of the organization as a path to power.

=== Xi Jinping era ===
In 2013, CCP general secretary Xi Jinping criticized the leadership of the CYLC, stating that "All they [cadres] can do is just repeat the same old bureaucratic, stereotypical talk". He lambasted the CYLC as being a slogan-touting "hollow shell" that was bureaucratic, arrogant, ill-informed, elitist, and hedonistic. He criticized CYLC officials for using the organization as a launchpad for their political careers, and said it must experience hardship and reorient itself toward vulnerable groups such as the rural poor, migrants, the disabled, and women and children left behind in the countryside. Xi's criticisms were later published in an official book in September 2017. South China Morning Post states, "Wu Qiang, a former political science lecturer at Tsinghua University in Beijing, said Xi's trenchant criticism of the youth league reflected his intention to transform it from a bureaucracy to an organisation that can mobilise the masses – much in line with the party's rekindled 'mass line' campaign, developed by Mao Zedong, to reconnect with the public." Political commentators have noted that the diminishing of the Tuanpai curtailed the influence of former paramount leader Hu Jintao, solidifying Xi's own political faction.

Following Xi's more critical stance of the CYLC, its membership decreased. CYLC's budget was cut, dropping from around 700 million yuan ($96 million) in 2012 to 260 million yuan ($40 million) in 2021, while its membership dropped from 90 million to 74 million in the same period. Xi's anti-corruption campaign also impacted the CYLC. Xi effectively closed the Central School of China Communist Youth League, folding it into the Chinese Academy of Social Sciences. He also effectively demoted Qin Yizhi, first secretary of the CYLC in 2017. During the Xi-era, the CYLC's rule that non-cadre over the age of 28 must leave the organization has been more strictly enforced. In 2016, the CCP Central Committee approved the Reform Plan for the Central Committee of the Communist Youth League, calling for a substantial overhaul of the CYLC leadership, including the shrinking of the central leadership, putting it more directly under CCP supervision. Additionally, new rules stated that CYLC cadres could no longer transfer directly to leadership positions in the CCP or government units.

Beginning in March 2016, the CYLC and Alibaba began a collaboration to promote online entrepreneurship among rural Chinese youth. In 2020, the CYLC began asking its 74 million members to "regularly report personal situations" while studying abroad. In 2021, the CYLC criticized what it called the "patriotism industry," referring to content creators who used patriotism as a tool to obtain more online views and 'likes' in order to advance their profit motive. At the CYLC's centennial in May 2022, Xi described the organization as the "party's loyal assistant and reliable reserve force."

== Structure ==
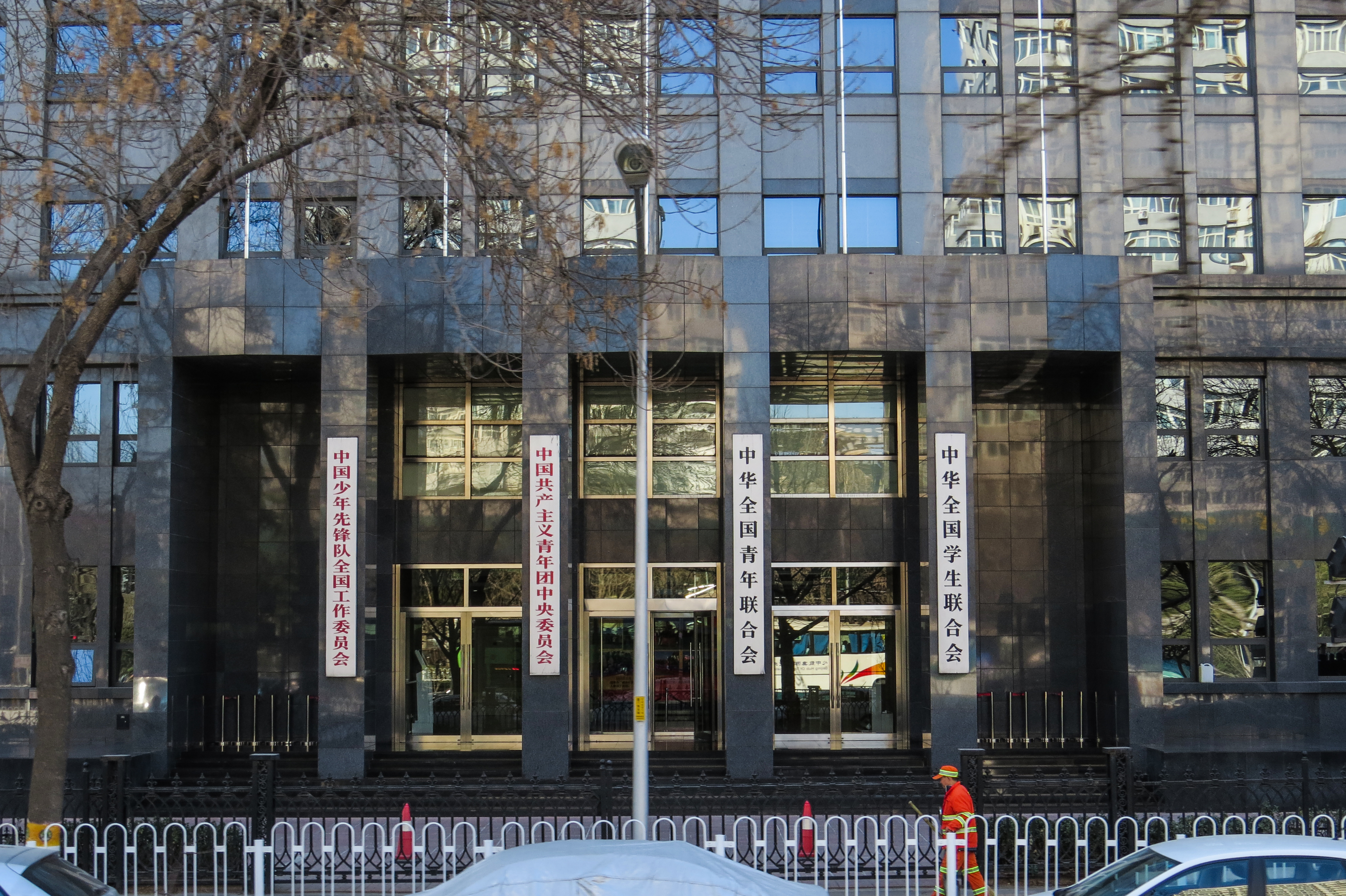
Communist Youth League headquarters

The CYLC is active at every political level of China, and most active in social structures which include many young people like schools and universities. By the end of 2002, there were approximately 210,000 committee members of fundamental organizations. 2021 estimates put the number of Youth League members at over 81 million.

CYLC local groups (including those which are associated with institutions like universities or state-owned enterprises) send a total of 1,500 representatives to the CYLC National Congress, which is held every five years. The National Congress in turn elects the CYLC Central Committee, which is composed of 200 representatives and 120 alternates. The Central Committee's daily operations are handled by a Secretariat, which is led by the first secretary. Smaller CYLC congresses and committee plenums are also held.

The CYLC directly manages the All-China Youth Federation. The All-China Youth Federation in turn serves as a consultative body to the CYLC. The All-China Youth Federation is also an umbrella organization which includes the Young Pioneers of China, among other youth-focused groups. The Communist Youth League is also responsible for guiding the activities of the Young Pioneers, which is for children below the age of 14. The CYLC is also the parent entity of other youth-related projects, such as the China Youth Development Fund. The CYLC supervises university student societies through one of its departments. The CYLC operates a dating platform in an effort to boost the country's fertility rate.

=== Revenue ===
The CYLC's offices and staff salaries are paid for with government funding. Its employees are public servants who must pass the examinations required of public servants. CYLC collects membership dues on a sliding scale depending on a member's salary.

== Membership and training ==
Officially defined as a "reserve force" for the CCP, the CYLC's purpose is to recruit and train young people who may become future party members and officials. In addition to the CYLC members it trains for future involvement in the party, the CYLC employs young party cadre who lead the organization, providing them with experience for subsequent leadership roles in other aspects of the party-state.

Joining the league is relatively easy. Prospective members must submit an application statement and be approved by the local branch, which do not typically take a highly selective stance. Entrance to the league generally begins at the age of 14. Criteria mainly includes achievements in school, correct thinking (which is done largely through an application essay), and proper conduct towards teachers and fellow students. By later years, a majority of students in cities generally join the league. An applicant is put to a probation period, which lasts around six months to one year. During this period, the applicant's attendance to league events and activities is monitored. All CYLC members and their personal details are tracked in a database known as Smart League Building. As of 2020, CYLC members outside of China are required to "regularly report personal situations" while abroad.

By the end of 2025, the CYLC had 78.336 million members and 5.15 million organizations throughout China. Among them, there were 3,000 local committees, 199,000 grassroot committees, 139,000 general branches, and 4.809 million branches. There were 2.355 million CYLC organizations at schools with 41.833 million members, 347,000 CYLC organizations in government agencies and public institutions with 3.798 million members, 271,000 CYLC organizations in state-owned and collective enterprises with 2.818 million members, 954,000 CYLC organizations at subdistricts, townships, communities, and administrative villages with 23.917 million members, and 1.223 million organizations in social organizations in emerging fields and other fields with 5.970 million members.

== Media ==
CYLC's newspaper is the China Youth Daily.

As it lost political influence under Xi, CYLC has started to increase its presence on social media, appealing to nationalism and attacking foreign brands in China accused of misbehavior. During the 2021 Henan floods, the CYLC asked its social media followers to locate and report the location of a BBC News journalist on assignment covering the story and stated that foreign reporters in focusing on criticism of China following the floods instead of recovery efforts were slandering China. CYLC social media accounts have also spread the COVID-19 disinformation that the virus originated at Fort Detrick and have criticized Chinese dissidents to whom they attribute involvement in creating a colour revolution. In 2022, the CYLC's social media account exclaimed that "[e]xtreme feminism has become a poisonous tumour on the Internet."

=== Anthem ===
In 1987, the first anthem of CYLC was composed.

- "Glory to the Communist Youth League of China"
- 光荣啊！中国共青团

(Guāngróng a! Zhōngguó gòngqīngtuán)

Simplified Chinese (with Pinyin)

我们(Wǒmen)是(shì)五(wǔ)月(yuè)的(de)花(huā)海(hǎi,)，
用(Yòng)青春(qīngchūn)拥抱(yǒngbào)时代(shídài;);
我们(Wǒmen)是(shì)初(chū)升(shēng)的(de)太阳(tàiyáng,)，
用(Yòng)生命(shēngmìng)点燃(diǎnrán)未来(wèilái.)。
五四(Wǔsì)的(de)火炬(huǒjù,)，
唤起了(Huànqǐle)民族(mínzú)的(de)觉醒(juéxǐng.)。
壮丽(Zhuànglì)的(de)事业(shìyè,)，
激励着(Jīlìzhe)我们(wǒmen)继往开来(jìwǎngkāilái.)。
光荣啊(Guāngróng a,)，中国(zhōngguó)共青团(gòngqīngtuán,)，
光荣啊(Guāngróng a,)，中国(zhōngguó)共青团(gòngqīngtuán.)。
母亲(Mǔqīn)用(yòng)共产(gòngchǎn)主义(zhǔyì)为(wèi)我们(wǒmen)命名(mìngmíng,)，
我们(Wǒmen)开(kāi)创新(chuàngxīn)的(de)世界(shìjiè.)。

English lyrics

We are the flowers of May,
Who embrace the age of youth;
We are the rising sun,
Who ignites the future with life.
The torch of May Fourth,
Aroused the awakening of the nation.
The magnificent cause,
Inspires us to forge ahead to the future.
Glory to the Communist Youth League of China,
Glory to the Communist Youth League of China.
Mother named us with communism.
We are creating a new world.

== Chronology of National Congresses ==
- 1st National Congress (Socialist Youth League): 5–10 May 1922
- 2nd National Congress (Socialist Youth League): 2–25 August 1923
- 3rd National Congress (Socialist Youth League): 26–30 January 1925
- 4th National Congress: 10–16 May 1927
- 5th National Congress: 12–16 July 1928
- 6th National Congress (1st Congress, New Democratic Youth League): 11–18 April 1949
- 7th National Congress (2nd Congress, New Democratic Youth League): 23 June–2 July 1953
- 8th National Congress (3rd Congress, New Democratic Youth League): 12–25 May 1957
- 9th National Congress: 11–29 June 1964
- 10th National Congress: 16–26 October 1978
- 11th National Congress: 20–30 December 1982
- 12th National Congress: 4–8 May 1988
- 13th National Congress: 3–10 May 1993
- 14th National Congress: 19–25 June 1998
- 15th National Congress: 22–26 July 2003
- 16th National Congress: 10–13 June 2008
- 17th National Congress: 17–21 June 2013
- 18th National Congress: 26–29 June 2018
- 19th National Congress: 19–22 June 2023

== See also ==
- Komsomol
- Socialist Patriotic Youth League
- China Youth University of Political Studies
- Kuomintang Youth League
