= Relations between the Kuomintang and the Chinese Communist Party =

Flags of the Kuomintang and the Chinese Communist Party.

Relations between the Kuomintang and the Chinese Communist Party discusses the relationship between the Kuomintang (KMT) and the Chinese Communist Party (CCP) throughout their history.

In 1923, after Kuomintang leader Sun Yat-sen and Soviet representative Adolph Joffe signed the Sun–Joffe Manifesto, and at the request of the Communist International, the CCP members were allowed to join the Kuomintang as individuals as part of the First United Front, but a split occurred in 1927. After the split in 1927, the two parties engaged in armed confrontation as part of the Chinese Civil War. After the Xi'an Incident, the Kuomintang was forced to ally with the CCP to fight against Japan, which laid the groundwork for the civil war in the future.

The civil war resumed in 1946 and continued until 1949 when the CCP established the People's Republic of China. After 1950, the Kuomintang lost all control of mainland China. The Republic of China government moved to Taiwan and pursued an anti-communist political ideology. After that, the two sides engaged in armed confrontation for many years and competed for the right to represent China at the international level. After Taiwan achieved democratic transformation and the Kuomintang lost power for the first time in 2000, it started improving relations with the Communist Party. After the first meeting between the leaders of the two parties in 2005, the relationship between the two parties became one of the communication channels between China and Taiwan in cross-strait relations.

== The First United Front (1923–1927) ==
The first Kuomintang-Communist cooperation occurred in the 1920s. Initially, the Kuomintang (KMT) cooperated with the emerging Chinese Communist Party (CCP). However, due to political differences—the KMT aimed to establish a democratic republic of the people, by the people, and for the people, independently governed by the Chinese, while the CCP aimed to establish a communist state led by the working class— the Three Principles of the People and communism were irreconcilable. Coupled with the reluctance to allow other parties to disrupt the chaotic situation, the KMT adopted an anti-communist policy. Later, the CCP proposed establishing an "anti-imperialist and anti-feudal" front and sought cooperation with the KMT to form a "revolutionary united front." In July 1922, at its Second National Congress, the CCP proposed "external cooperation" (meaning all cooperation would not involve internal party affairs), but Comintern representative in China, Maring, advocated "internal cooperation" (meaning CCP members would join the KMT individually), transforming the KMT into an alliance of revolutionary classes. This proposal was accepted by the CCP at the time. China was then in a period of warlordism. In December 1921, Maring, a representative of the Comintern, with the consent of Sun Yat-sen, went to Sun's Guilin headquarters for nine days with Zhang Tailei. He had three long talks with Sun and made extensive contact with other leaders of the Kuomintang. Afterwards, Maring proposed that the Chinese Communist Party should cooperate with the Kuomintang. In modern Chinese history, both the Kuomintang and the Chinese Communist Party were revolutionary parties born with the mission of saving the country and the people.

In September 1922, through Zhang Ji's introduction, Sun Yat-sen personally led the alliance, and Chen Duxiu, Li Dazhao, and others formally joined the Kuomintang. In January 1923, after talks in Shanghai, Sun Yat-sen and Soviet representative Joffe issued a joint declaration, also known as the Sun-Joffe Declaration. The declaration stated that "the communist system is not suitable for China; the Soviet Union will abandon its unequal treaties and privileges against China; the Northeast Railway issue will be resolved through negotiations between China and the Soviet Union; and the Soviet Union has no intention of separating Outer Mongolia from China, therefore the Soviet troops stationed in Mongolia need not withdraw immediately," thus initiating an alliance with Russia and accommodation of the Communists. In February, Liao Zhongkai was sent to negotiate with the Soviet Union, and in August, Chiang Kai-shek was sent to the Soviet Union to investigate military affairs. In October, the Comintern appointed Mikhail Markovich Borodin as an advisor to reorganize the Kuomintang.

In June 1923, the Third National Congress of the Chinese Communist Party (CCP) established the policy that all CCP members should join the Kuomintang (KMT) in their individual capacities and form a "revolutionary united front " with the KMT. From January 20 to 30, 1924, Sun Yat-sen convened the First National Congress of the KMT in Guangzhou. The congress adopted the policy of alliance with Russia and tolerance of the CCP, and elected the Central Executive Committee of the KMT. Ten CCP members, including Li Dazhao, Tan Pingshan, Mao Zedong, Lin Zuhan, and Qu Qiubai, were elected as members or alternate members of the Central Executive Committee, representing approximately one-quarter of the total members. This marked the formal establishment of the first Kuomintang-Communist cooperation.

Following the meeting, members of the Chinese Communist Party who held important positions in the Kuomintang (KMT) Central Committee included: Tan Pingshan, the Organization Minister, and Lin Zuhan, the Agriculture Minister. Subsequently, the CCP, under the guise of cooperation, divided and expanded within the KMT, and the so-called left and right wings within the KMT later arose from this CCP-led division.

With Soviet assistance, the military component of the Whampoa Military Academy was established in Guangzhou's Huangpu District in May 1924. Chiang Kai-shek served as its principal, Liao Zhongkai as its party representative, and Zhou Enlai as its deputy director of the political department. The Whampoa Military Academy emphasized both political education and military training, drawing on the Soviet military system and focusing on cultivating patriotism and revolutionary spirit. The establishment of the Whampoa Military Academy laid the foundation for the National Revolutionary Army.

== The split between the Kuomintang and the Communist Party ==
The first Kuomintang-Communist cooperation accelerated the development of the CCP. However, after Sun Yat-sen's death in March 1925, factions rose up within the Kuomintang, and the Kuomintang-Communist cooperation gradually began to falter. The Soviet Union accelerated its efforts to divide the Kuomintang through the Chinese Communist Party. On June 23, the Shamian Massacre occurred. The Guangdong-Hong Kong strike was originally led by Liao Zhongkai, the leader of the Kuomintang left wing, but it was actually dominated by the Communist Party. On August 20, Liao Zhongkai was assassinated. Soviet advisor Borodin accused Hu Hanmin, the anti-communist right wing leader, of being the mastermind and forced him to step down. On November 23, 1925, Xie Chi, Zou Lu and other Kuomintang elders held the " Fourth Plenary Session of the First National Congress of the Kuomintang " at Biyun Temple in Xishan, Beijing, and announced the separation from the Communist Party.

In January 1926, the Second National Congress of the Kuomintang (KMT) was held. Chiang Kai- shek, returning to Guangdong after his second Eastern Expedition, proposed the Northern Expedition. Wang Jingwei expressed his support, while Borodin had no objection. The Xishan Conference was denied, and Xie, Zou, and others were expelled from the party. However, shortly afterward, the Northern Expedition plan was suddenly rejected by Soviet advisor Jishanjia, and again in February and March (leading to the Zhongshan Incident). Wang Jingwei also cooperated with the Soviet Union in resisting the Northern Expedition (as evidenced by the private conversations between Chiang and Wang, which were quickly learned by Jishanjia). In March, the "Zhongshan Incident " occurred. Li Zhilong, a Communist Party member and acting director of the Naval Bureau, falsely ordered the Zhongshan warship to sail from Guangzhou back to Huangpu to be loaded with coal. He then sailed back to Guangzhou the following day with ulterior motives. On the morning of the 20th, Chiang Kai-shek purged Communist Party members from within the KMT and restored military and political power to the party. In May, at the Second Plenary Session of the Second National Congress of the KMT, Chiang Kai-shek proposed the " Party Affairs Reorganization Plan," limiting the proportion of Chinese Communist Party members holding positions within the KMT. Borodin also agreed to cooperate, making the Northern Expedition possible. Following the Northern Expedition in July, Chiang Kai-shek, Commander-in-Chief of the National Revolutionary Army, rose rapidly in status. Meanwhile, the Chinese Communist Party expanded within the Kuomintang and its military political departments, leading to increasing internal contradictions within the Kuomintang.

In October 1926, peasant movements broke out in Hunan and Hubei provinces. The slogans were " Down with the local tyrants, distribute the land, and give all power to the peasant associations." At that time, Mao Zedong visited Hunan to understand the situation and wrote the "Research Report on the Peasant Movement in Hunan." The report praised the peasant mass movement, pointing out that "correcting a wrong requires going to extremes," "revolution is not a dinner party or writing an essay," and "revolution is one class overthrowing another." In a report to the Central Committee in 1927, the Hunan Provincial Committee of the Chinese Communist Party stated: "Amidst this encirclement of the peasant movement by social forces, we also acknowledge that the current peasant movement is indeed too left-wing and immature. Therefore, we issued a notice prohibiting peasant associations from imposing fines and arrests, and restricted the executive committee members of district and township peasant associations to be current farmers. Those who impose fines and arrests must be eliminated. Almost unconsciously, we sided with the rich peasants and landlords while restricting the poor peasants. Only after Comrade Mao Zedong returned from his inspection of the countryside did we realize that it was truly necessary for the poor peasants to fiercely attack the local tyrants and evil gentry."

After the Third Plenary Session of the Second National Congress of the Kuomintang in March 1927 (March 10–17), about one-third of the eighty members of its executive and supervisory committees and alternate members were Communist Party members, and one-third were pro-Communist leftists. More than half of the ministers and secretaries of the various departments of the Kuomintang Central Committee were also Communist Party members. By this time, the National Government was completely controlled by Soviet advisors and Communist forces. Borodin also established the "Provisional Joint Conference of the Central Executive Committee of the Kuomintang and the Committee of the National Government" in Wuhan. By controlling the Chinese Communist Party and the left wing of the Kuomintang, he gained political dominance. On the grounds of "enhancing party power", "opposing military dictatorship" and "overthrowing the new warlords", the Third Plenary Session of the Second National Congress of the Kuomintang passed the "Resolution on Unifying the Party's Leadership Organs" on March 10, 1927.It passed anti-Chiang Kai-shek plans such as "unifying revolutionary forces" and "unifying the party's leadership organs". Subsequently, during Chiang Kai-shek's Northern Expedition, he was stripped of his chairmanship and demoted to an ordinary member. In Nanchang, Chiang Kai-shek issued a letter to his fellow students at the Whampoa Military Academy, indicating his rejection of the resolution. Faced with the pro-Soviet forces' push for Chiang's resignation, Chiang resolved to sever ties with the Communist Party. He then discussed with Wang Jingwei, who had just returned from abroad, launching a purge of the party, expelling Soviet advisors, and breaking with the Communists. Wang Jingwei proposed a solution to avoid overreaction, suggesting that Chiang personally go to Wuhan to persuade the Communists to relocate the Nationalist government and party headquarters to Nanjing.

In early April 1927, the right wing of the Kuomintang held a meeting in Shanghai, where it was proposed that "the Communist Party is united with Communist Party members who are incorporated into the Kuomintang and there is evidence of treason." After Wang Jingwei returned to China, he took the lead of the Wuhan government as a centrist. On April 6, with the consent of the diplomatic corps, Zhang Zuolin dispatched Chinese military police to raid the Soviet Embassy, the Far Eastern Bank, and the Chinese Eastern Railway office in Beijing, arresting 58 Chinese who had been hiding there for a long time, including Li Dazhao, one of the main founders of the Chinese Communist Party. He also publicly released a large number of instructions, orders, and subversive materials from the Comintern (documents on cooperation with Feng Yuxiang to subvert the government, records of the Red Spear Society and inciting peasants, documents of the Chinese Communist Party, etc., "Collection of Soviet Conspiracy Documents"), confirming that the Soviet Union was in overall command of the movement to subvert the Chinese government. The Soviet Union and the Chinese Communist Party strongly condemned the Kuomintang for its blatant violation of the dignity of the Soviet Embassy and called the incident "the instigation of imperialism, and the Chinese government has become a tool of imperialism." On April 12, the right wing of the Kuomintang and Chiang Kai-shek formally broke with the Chinese Communist Party and successively searched for and arrested members of the Chinese Communist Party and Soviet officials in Shanghai, Guangxi, Guangzhou and other places. The Kuomintang called this " purge ". On April 18, the National Government was established in Nanjing. Wang Jingwei disagreed with the purge, and Nanjing and Wuhan were split for a time (Nanjing-Wuhan split). The Nanjing National Government issued an arrest warrant for about 200 members of the Chinese Communist Party. On April 19, the Soviet Union recalled its chargé d'affaires and embassy staff in Beijing. Stalin later admitted that it was a mistake to use the Chinese Communist Party to divide the Kuomintang. On July 15, after learning of Borodin's plan to seize power in collusion with the Chinese Communist Party, Wang Jingwei in Wuhan also began a peaceful separation from the Communists.

== The First Chinese Civil War (1927–1936) ==
On August 1, 1927, the Chinese Communist Party launched the Nanchang Uprising, firing the first shot in armed resistance against the Kuomintang. The two sides confronted each other and launched an armed uprising. The first cooperation between the Kuomintang and the Communist Party ended here. A few days later, the Chinese Communist Party fled and launched uprisings in Hunan, Guangdong, Jiangsu and Zhejiang in the following months, but all failed. In September, Mao Zedong launched the Autumn Harvest Uprising in Hunan, which failed. He led his remaining troops into Jinggang Mountain, which is located on the border of Jiangxi and Hunan, to establish a base area. In the Jinan Massacre of 1928, 6,123 Chinese soldiers and civilians died and 1,701 were injured. Chiang Kai-shek ordered the Northern Expeditionary Army to "endure humiliation and bear the burden" and withdraw from Jinan, taking a detour to the Northern Expedition. Finally, after Chiang punished the main Chinese officers who participated in the war, the Japanese army withdrew from Jinan. In 1928, after the meeting of Zhu De and Mao Zedong, the Chinese Communist Party continued to grow and established several "Soviet areas" in Hunan, Jiangxi, Guangdong and Fujian.

At the time, the National Revolutionary Army was engaged in the Northern Expedition, followed by the Jiang-Gui War in 1929 and the Central Plains War in 1930, leaving it no time to attend to the development of the Chinese Communist Party. In 1929, the Sino- Soviet conflict over the Chinese Eastern Railway in Northeast China resulted in heavy losses for the Northeast Army, and Zhang Xueliang signed the " Sino-Soviet Khabarovsk Protocol." This action exposed the Northeast Army's outward strength but inner weakness, giving the Japanese Kwantung Army confidence to take action in Northeast China. From 1931 onwards, the international faction of Chinese students in Russia took control of the Chinese Communist Party. Their ideas and goals were not in line with the actual situation in China. They still advocated the proletarian revolution and attempted to occupy the cities and then make the provinces independent. On November 7, 1931, the Chinese Communist Party established the Chinese Soviet Republic in the Central Soviet Area on the Soviet Union's National Day and made Ruijin, Jiangxi the capital.

The Chinese Communist Party was able to catch its breath and expand. In 1930, it established Soviet areas in southern Jiangxi, western Fujian, and the border areas of Hunan, Hubei, Henan, and Anhui. In November 1931, it established the Provisional Central Government of the Chinese Soviet Republic in Ruijin, Jiangxi. The first Kuomintang-Communist cooperation completely broke down, and the two parties entered the stage of encirclement and suppression and counter-encirclement. On November 7, 1931, the Provisional Government of the Chinese Soviet Republic was established. In December, the Comintern instructed that overthrowing the Kuomintang was a prerequisite for the national revolutionary war against Japanese imperialism and all imperialism. It was necessary to develop a strike movement, lead the student movement, and call on soldiers and the people to unite against imperialism and the Kuomintang. In January 1932, Chiang Kai-shek said, "To resist Japan, we must first suppress bandits; to resist foreign aggression, we must first pacify the country. To pacify the country, we must resist foreign aggression; to suppress bandits, we must resist Japan." On April 15, 1932, the Provisional Central Government of the Chinese Soviet Republic declared war on Japan.

In October 1933, the Nationalist government mobilized nearly 1 million National Revolutionary Army soldiers to encircle and suppress the rural base areas controlled by the Chinese Communist Party, forcing the Chinese Red Army to embark on the Long March to the Shaanxi-Gansu-Ningxia Border Region. On November 22, the Fujian Uprising was launched by Chen Mingshu and other anti-Chiang leftists within the Kuomintang. On December 3, the Chinese Communist Party held its first military leadership meeting to discuss whether to send troops to support the 19th Route Army of the National Revolutionary Army. After the meeting, because the 19th Route Army had participated in the second, third and fourth encirclement campaigns, the Central Committee of the Chinese Communist Party decided on December 5 not to support the People's Revolutionary Government of the Republic of China.

On January 13, 1934, the People's Revolutionary Government of the Republic of China was quelled by the Nationalist Government, and existed for only 53 days. In October, the Chinese Workers' and Peasants' Red Army broke through the encirclement and embarked on the Long March of 25,000 li. A year later, they arrived in northern Shaanxi with more than 10,000 troops remaining. The Kuomintang sent Zhang Xueliang's Northeast Army to Shaanxi to continue the siege. In 1935, Peng Tao and others from the Provisional Municipal Committee of the Chinese Communist Party in Beiping launched the December 9th Movement through the Beiping Student Union to oppose Chiang Kai-shek's "pacification before resistance against foreign aggression" and demand "stopping the civil war and uniting against foreign aggression." One of their goals was to oppose the establishment of the Hebei-Chahar Political Affairs Committee.

== The Second United Front (1937–1945) ==
During the First Chinese Civil War, the Soviet Union instructed the CCP to ally with Chiang Kai-shek against Japan. The Nationalist government adopted a policy of internal pacification and external resistance, which was opposed by local warlords. Zhang Xueliang launched the Xi'an Incident, taking Chiang Kai-shek hostage, forcing the Nationalist government to abandon its policy of internal unification and initiate the Second United Front.

=== Kuomintang ===
Faced with the escalating military advance of Japan and the rising tide of anti-Japanese sentiment, Chiang Kai-shek adjusted his policy of prioritizing internal pacification over external resistance, expressing a willingness to discuss joint resistance against Japan with the Chinese Communist Party. Following the Fifth National Congress of the Kuomintang in November 1935, Chiang adopted a hardline stance on the ongoing Sino-Japanese diplomatic negotiations and adjusted his policy towards the Soviet Union. In connection with this, Chiang proposed "establishing relations with the Communist Party" in November 1935.

In October 1935, the Chinese Communist Party's “Secret Instruction Letter from the Central Committee on the Current Anti-Japanese and Anti-Chiang Kai-shek Campaign” was a major step forward from the “August 1st Declaration”. The instruction letter believed that the political attitudes of various classes in Chinese society were “very different” from those in 1927: the vast majority of petty bourgeoisie, a part of the national bourgeoisie, and some Chinese Kuomintang officers and politicians were also anti-Chiang Kai-shek and anti-Japanese; some Chinese Kuomintang generals were unwilling to be slaves of a conquered country and Japanese lackeys, and were threatened by soldiers and the masses, so they wanted to find another way to survive. In short, “the social foundation of the Chinese revolution has greatly expanded at present”. The instruction letter proposed that the Party's strategic policy was a broad united front. The whole party should fully recognize that: "No matter what class (from workers and peasants to capitalists), if they are unwilling to be slaves of a conquered country and are willing to fulfill their duty to save China, the Chinese Communist Party is willing to unite with them to jointly plan anti-Japanese and anti-Chiang Kai-shek actions"; "No matter what party (from the Production Party to the Social Democratic Party and the Nationalist Party), if they are willing to do any anti-Japanese and anti-Chiang Kai-shek activities and have a little bit of sentiment to save the country, the Chinese Communist Party is willing to sincerely and earnestly form a united front with them to jointly shoulder the responsibility of saving China".

Under these circumstances, starting from the beginning of 1936, the Kuomintang and the Communist Party broke the long-standing deadlock and sent representatives to make secret contacts through various channels. The Kuomintang asked the Chinese Communist Party to "cooperate in resisting Japan" and communicate with each other to understand each other, thus paving the way for formal negotiations between the two parties. On November 23, 1936, seven people, including executive members of the National Salvation Federation of All Circles, were arrested by the Nationalist government. Finally, the Chinese Communist Party sent Zhou Enlai to Xi'an to discuss the solution with the Kuomintang. Under the mediation of Soong Tse-ven and Soong Mei-ling, Chiang Kai-shek abandoned the basic national policy of " pacifying the country before resisting foreign aggression " and was released. The Kuomintang and the Communist Party formed a joint resistance against Japan on the surface, which became one of the key factors that influenced the Chinese War of Resistance against Japan and the Chinese Civil War in the future. All classes in China increasingly realized that further kneeling and compromising with Japan would mean destruction for all classes in China.

On December 12, 1936, Zhang Xueliang and Yang Hucheng took advantage of Chiang Kai-shek, Chairman of the Military Commission of the National Government, personally going to Xi'an to direct the suppression of the Communists, and launched the Xi'an Incident, "remonstrating" against Chiang, which shocked China and the world. Chiang was eventually released under the mediation of Soong Mei-ling and Zhou Enlai. After the Xi'an Incident, the CCP was optimistic that "as long as the three sides unite and really harden their stance, so that the Central Army does not dare to advance, it is possible to release Zhang Xueliang and complete the semi-independence of the Northwest." Finally, with the intervention of the Soviet Union, the CCP temporarily suspended its resistance against the National Government, which basically ended the 10-year civil war between the Kuomintang and the Communist Party, and enabled the National Government and the Chinese Communist Party to carry out the second Kuomintang-Communist cooperation. The National Government strengthened its control over the Northwest.

Because of the Xi'an Incident caused by Zhang Xueliang and Yang Hucheng, the Chinese Communist Party was able to recover and was incorporated into the Xi'an Headquarters as early as February 1937. From February 9 to late September, representatives of the Kuomintang and the Communist Party held six rounds of negotiations in Xi'an, Hangzhou, Lushan and Nanjing. After more than seven months of repeated discussions, the Chinese Communist Party agreed to end separatism and postpone the class struggle movement.

On August 6, the Beiping government under Japanese occupation was established, and on August 20, the Hebei-Chahar Political Affairs Committee was dissolved. From August 20 to 25, the Chinese Communist Party held the Luochuan Conference and established the CCP's anti-Japanese war policy. : "Create base areas, contain and eliminate the enemy, cooperate with the Kuomintang army in combat, preserve and expand the Red Army, and strive for the Communist Party's leadership over the "national revolution" war." On the same day, Mao Zedong ordered the Eighth Route Army to cross Shanxi to Hebei to support Fu Zuoyi's troops in combat. However, he later informed the front-line commanders via radio that the earlier order was purely for propaganda. In fact, the Eighth Route Army should slow down its movement as much as possible, "moving fifty li (25 kilometers on foot) every day, and resting for one day after every three days of marching." On August 22, the following order was issued to incorporate the surrendered Chinese Communist Party: Zhu De was appointed as the commander-in-chief of the Eighth Route Army of the National Revolutionary Army, and Peng Dehuai was appointed as the deputy commander-in-chief; a total of 3 divisions were under its command, with a total of 20,000 soldiers. The Military Commission designated the Eighth Route Army as part of the second combat order, under the command of Yan Xishan, and sent it to fight in northern Shanxi. Ren Bishi served as the director of the Political Department of the Eighth Route Army. Lin Zuhan and Zhang Guotao served as the chairman and vice chairman of the Shaanxi-Gansu-Ningxia Border Region Government.

On September 6, the Military Commission of the National Government ordered the reorganization of the Chinese Communist Party's army into the Eighth Route Army of the National Revolutionary Army, with Zhu De as the commander-in-chief. The Eighth Route Army of the National Revolutionary Army had a total of 45,000 men and a General Headquarters. The National Government recognized the Shaanxi-Gansu-Ningxia Border Region Government through the " Eradication of the Red Influence " case, stopped the military suppression of the Communists, and allocated military pay to the Eighth Route Army of the National Revolutionary Army.

On September 22, the National Government issued the Declaration of the Chinese Communist Party on Jointly Facing the National Crisis. The Chinese Communist Party made four promises to the National Government in the form of "taking two steps forward and one step back": (1) Sun Yat-sen's Three Principles of the People are necessary for China today, and our party is willing to fight for their complete realization; (2) abolish all policies of uprising and red movement to overthrow the Kuomintang regime, stop the policies of uprising and red movement, and stop all policies of confiscating landlords' land through uprisings; (3) abolish the current Soviet government in order to unify the national government; (4) abolish the name and designation of the Red Army, reorganize it into the National Revolutionary Army, be under the command of the Military Commission of the National Government, and be ready to be dispatched to serve as the front line of the War of Resistance against Japan. The Central News Agency of the Kuomintang announced the "Declaration of the CCP Central Committee on the Cooperation between the Kuomintang and the Communist Party". The New Fourth Army was established, with Yuan Guoping as the director of the Political Department, Zhang Yunyi as the chief of staff, and Chen Yi, Zhang Dingcheng, Zhang Yunyi (concurrently), and Gao Jingting as the commanders. On September 23, Chiang Kai-shek made a statement hoping that the Chinese Communist Party would be sincere and united and work hard to resist foreign aggression and save the nation. [43] Chiang issued a statement on the declaration of the Chinese Communist Party, announcing that he recognized the Chinese Communist Party as legitimate. Thus, the second Kuomintang-Communist cooperation was formally completed. In September, the Battle of Taiyuan broke out in Shanxi. By December, the Battle of Nanjing of the Republic of China had begun, and the Nationalist government Chongqing. Subsequently, the commander of the Japanese Shanghai Expeditionary Army (later renamed the Central China Expeditionary Army) was Matsui Iwane, who ordered the " Nanjing Massacre ". The most serious killing was by the commander of the 6th Division, Tani Hisao. The Nanjing Massacre lasted for several months, killing more than 300,000 Chinese civilians and prisoners of war (the Far East International Military Tribunal estimated it to be more than 260,000), thereby damaging the morale of the Chinese people. As early as December 1937, Li Fuying was executed in Shanxi for retreating from the front line.

=== Chinese Communist Party ===
During the Chinese War of Resistance Against Japan, the Chinese Communist Party, under explicit instructions from the Soviet Union, cooperated with the Kuomintang in the form of a united front against Japan. At the same time, the CCP launched a large-scale production campaign in the Shaanxi-Gansu-Ningxia Border Region to address its own supply problems.

In 1935, the North China Incident elevated the Sino-Japanese national contradiction to the primary contradiction in Chinese society, triggering significant changes in domestic and international relations and a reorganization of various political forces. The policies of the two Chinese regimes— the Republic of China and the Chinese Soviet Republic— changed accordingly. On June 10, the Provisional Central Committee of the Chinese Communist Party in Shanghai issued a declaration calling on all levels of the Chinese Communist Party to cooperate with the Kuomintang in resisting Japan. On August 1, the delegation of the Chinese Communist Party to the Comintern, acting on instructions from the Soviet Union, issued the "Letter to All Compatriots for Resisting Japan and Saving the Nation" (the " August 1st Declaration ") in Moscow, on behalf of the Central Committee of the Chinese Communist Party and the Chinese Soviet Government. The declaration called for national unity, an end to the civil war, resistance against Japan, national salvation, the organization of a national defense government and an anti-Japanese united army, and a forceful strike against Yan Xishan's army. Subsequently, in late December, the Central Committee of the Chinese Communist Party held a Politburo meeting in Wayaobao, Anding County, Shaanxi Province, criticizing the errors within the Chinese Communist Party and adopting the "Resolution on the Current Political Situation and the Tasks of the Party," establishing the strategic policy of the anti-Japanese national united front. Mao Zedong then delivered a report entitled "On the Strategy of Opposing Japanese Imperialism," which systematically expounded the strategic policy of the anti-Japanese national united front.

On May 5, the Chinese Communist Party issued a telegram entitled "Ceasefire and Peace Negotiation to Resist Japan Together," which stated that the Chinese Communist Party "is willing to cease fire and negotiate peace with all armed forces attacking the Red Army against Japan within one month in order to achieve the goal of resisting Japan together". It called on the Nanjing National Government to "stop the civil war and have both sides send representatives to discuss specific measures for resisting Japan and saving the nation".

In August 1936, based on further changes in the situation, the Central Committee of the Chinese Communist Party issued a letter to the Kuomintang, explicitly proposing to use public opinion to coerce the second Kuomintang-Communist cooperation, form a national united front against Japan, and change the slogan of "resisting Japan and opposing Chiang Kai-shek" to "forcing Chiang Kai-shek to resist Japan". On September 1, the Secretariat of the Central Committee of the Chinese Communist Party issued the " Instructions of the Central Committee on the Issue of Forcing Chiang Kai-shek to Resist Japan" to the party. In the instructions, the Chinese Communist Party abandoned "resisting Japan and opposing Chiang Kai-shek" and proposed "forcing Chiang Kai-shek to resist Japan".

The border region government and Mongolian anti-Japanese guerrilla forces established by the Chinese Communist Party, which were not under the command of the Nationalist government, gradually grew stronger. Most of the battlefields behind enemy lines were local troops of the Wang Jingwei regime. On December 14, 1937, the CCP Central Committee held a political meeting. As the Japanese army captured Nanjing, Mao Zedong's insistence on the independent and autonomous line was affirmed by the party. The meeting corrected the right-leaning capitulationism led by Wang Ming, which was called the united front to unite against Japan.

On January 15, 1938, the Jin-Cha-Ji Border Region Government was officially established in Wutai Mountain with special authorization from the Central Government. It had 100,000 guerrillas in Shanxi, Chahar and Hebei provinces. 66 On the same day, Chiang Kai-shek inspected the North China front and met with Zhu De, the commander-in-chief of the Eighth Route Army, and Peng Dehuai, the deputy commander-in-chief, in Luoyang. In October, Zhu De, the representative of the 18th Group Army of the National Revolutionary Army, submitted a proposal for the Kuomintang and the Communist Party to hold a training course for anti-Japanese guerrilla cadres, which was approved by Chiang Kai-shek. Subsequently, more than 30 people, including Ye Jianying and Li Tao, went to teach on behalf of the Communist Party army. The guerrilla cadre training course was held for 7 sessions, each lasting 3 months, with a total of 5,659 graduates.

During the War of Resistance Against Japan, the Chinese Communist Party seized cities and territories in the Japanese-occupied areas (the occupied areas), expanded the Chinese Workers' and Peasants' Red Army, and established major base areas in the Yangtze River Basin, including western Fujian, southern Jiangxi, Hunan and Hubei, Hubei-Henan-Anhui, western Hunan-Hubei, and Fujian-Zhejiang-Jiangxi. The guerrilla areas expanded to more than 124 counties. From 1937 to 1945, the National Revolutionary Army and the Japanese army fought 22 large-scale battles, 1,117 large-scale battles and 38,931 small battles, eliminating more than 450,000 Japanese soldiers; China suffered about 35,000,000 casualties and economic losses of US$600 billion. Overall, a united front against Japan was maintained. The Chinese Communist Party also launched numerous operations behind enemy lines, which played a certain role in restraining Japanese aggression.

In August 1945, the Soviet Red Army, in accordance with the Yalta Agreement, immediately declared war on Japan on August 8 and launched Operation August Storm. On August 9, it sent troops to Northeast China. At this time, the Japanese Kwantung Army had only 700,000 troops deployed in Northeast China and the Korean Peninsula, while the Soviet Red Army had as many as 1.5 million troops deployed to the Far East battlefield. The equipment of the two sides was vastly different. The Soviet Union fought against Japan for more than a week and occupied the entire Northeast China, the Southern Kuril Islands of Japan, and the northern part of the Korean Peninsula. After the Soviet army withdrew, it handed over a large amount of military supplies and ammunition to the CCP army. On August 15, Zhu De also sent a letter to the British, American, and Soviet ambassadors to China, stating that the Nationalist government could not represent China in accepting the surrender of the Japanese and puppet troops. Only the Yan'an headquarters had the right to represent China in the surrender process. He also called Chiang Kai-shek a "fascist tyrant and traitor" and "instigator of civil war".

== The Second Chinese Civil War (1946–1949) ==
After the end of the War of Resistance against Japan, the Kuomintang and the Chinese Communist Party held peace talks under the mediation of the United States. In August 1945, Mao Zedong, the newly appointed Chairman of the Chinese Communist Party, accompanied by the US ambassador, went to Chongqing to hold talks with the Kuomintang (KMT). In October, representatives from both sides signed the Double Tenth Agreement. In early 1946, the two sides held a political consultative conference and adopted agreements such as the program for peaceful national reconstruction. However, the peace was broken, and armed conflict broke out again. The KMT and the Communist Party engaged in a civil war for control. In June 1946, the KMT army besieged the CCP forces under Li Xiannian, which is considered the beginning of the full-scale civil war. What is not widely known is that although the two sides were at war, CCP representatives continued to operate legally in the KMT-controlled areas. For example, Zhou Enlai himself was in Nanjing until November 1946 and frequently met with KMT leaders and high-ranking officials. In March 1947, the KMT government ordered all CCP representatives and staff engaged in negotiations and liaison work in Chongqing, Nanjing, Shanghai, and other places to immediately return to Yan'an. The CCP officials believed that this expulsion marked the complete breakdown of the second KMT-CCP cooperation and that the KMT government was determined to resolve the Communist problem by force rather than peaceful means. During the Second Chinese Civil War, the Nationalist government only issued a “General Mobilization Order for Suppressing the Rebellion” to wage war against the CCP, but never explicitly ordered the attack on the Chinese Communist Party. This is completely different from the Nationalist government's explicit order to “eliminate the Communist Party” when the First Chinese-Kuomintang Cooperation broke down. On April 21, the People's Liberation Army launched the Yangtze River Crossing Campaign, capturing Nanjing on April 23. On October 1, the Chinese Communist Party formally established the Central People's Government of the People's Republic of China in Beijing, simultaneously changing the legal system and prohibiting any unauthorized counterattacks without the general's permission. The Kuomintang (KMT) moved the Republic of China government from Nanjing to Guangzhou, and on December 8, from Chongqing to Taipei, leaving mainland China. The two sides began a period of division and confrontation across the Taiwan Strait. The military confrontation was between the two sides: the Chinese Communist Party sought to "liberate Taiwan," while the KMT sought to "recover the mainland." On December 24, 1949, the State Council of the Central People's Government of the People's Republic of China designated August 15, the day Japan issued its surrender proclamation, as the "August 15th Victory Commemoration of the War of Resistance Against Japan."

== After 1949 ==
In 1979, the government of the PRC implemented the reform and opening up policy, and the Standing Committee of the National People's Congress issued a Message to Compatriots in Taiwan in the name of Chairman Ye Jianying; replacing the past "military liberation" with "peaceful reunification, one country, two systems". In 1982, the CCP unilaterally put forward the White Paper on the Taiwan Question on resolving the state of division between the two sides of the Taiwan Strait.

In 1987, the ROC government lifted martial law, allowing Taiwanese people to visit relatives in the PRC. Many veterans returned to their hometowns in the PRC. Cross-strait exchanges resumed to avoid further conflict.

On May 1, 1991, the Republic of China government promulgated the " Additional Articles to the Constitution of the Republic of China," which clearly defined the people of the Republic of China as divided into people of the free areas and people of the mainland areas, and restricted the rights and obligations of citizens to only people of the free areas, effectively freezing the rights and obligations of people of the mainland areas.

On the afternoon of March 28, 2005, Chiang Pin- kung, Vice Chairman of the Kuomintang (KMT), led a delegation to Guangzhou, officially kicking off the KMT's visit to mainland China after 60 years of separation. This also formally declared the beginning of an equal dialogue between the KMT and the Chinese Communist Party (CCP) to promote peaceful relations across the Taiwan Strait. From April 26 to May 3 of the same year, the KMT delegation, led by Chairman Lien Chan, visited mainland China, touring Nanjing, Beijing, Xi'an, and Shanghai, and held talks with leaders of the CCP in Beijing.

On October 16, 2007, Hu Jintao, General Secretary of the CCP Central Committee, delivered his first political report at the opening ceremony of the 17th CCP National Congress, calling on the ruling party of the Taiwan authorities to negotiate a formal end to the state of hostility across the Taiwan Strait on the basis of the "one-China" principle, reach a peace agreement, build a framework for peaceful development and openness across the Taiwan Strait, and create a new situation of peaceful development of cross-strait relations.

In 2019, Kuomintang Chairman Wu Den-yih stated that if he were to take power in the future, he would negotiate and sign a peace agreement. On May 13, 2019, former Kuomintang Chairman Hung Hsiu-chu met with Xi Jinping, General Secretary of the CCP Central Committee, in what was called the second Hung-Xi meeting.

On October 6, 2020, the Kuomintang (KMT) caucus in the Legislative Yuan proposed two motions: "The government should request the United States to assist in resisting the CCP " and " Resumption of diplomatic relations between Taiwan and the United States." The motions were passed without objection by the Legislative Yuan. Zhu Fenglian, spokesperson for the Taiwan Affairs Office of the Central Committee of the Chinese Communist Party, said that relevant KMT members should distinguish right from wrong and not do anything that would harm the fundamental interests of the Chinese nation and the peace and stability of cross-strait relations.

On December 18, 2024, Ma Ying-jeou, former chairman of the Kuomintang, led a delegation to visit China to participate in the Cross-Strait Youth Ice and Snow Festival.

=== Reconciliation ===
Taiwanese pro-unification figures have suggested that the two parties should end their state of hostility, a suggestion that originated from the consensus reached between Lien Chan and Hu Jintao at their meeting to "promote the formal end of the state of hostility across the Taiwan Strait."

- In 2014, Tsai Eng-meng, founder of the Want Want China Times Media Group, suggested that the Kuomintang and the Chinese Communist Party issue a "reconciliation declaration".
- In 2016, Wang Xiaobo, convener of the Taiwan high school curriculum review committee, said that the only way out for the Kuomintang was "cooperation between the Kuomintang and the Communist Party and peaceful reunification".

== See also ==
- 1992 Consensus
