= China Vocational Education Association =

Vocational education organization established in 1917

- 中华职业教育社
- Formation: May 6, 1917; 108 years ago
- Type: People's organization
- Headquarters: 69 Anlelin Road, Yongwai, Dongcheng, Beijing
- President: Hao Mingjin
- Website: www.zhzjs.org.cn

China Vocational Education Association
- Simplified Chinese: 中华职业教育社
- Traditional Chinese: 中華職業教育社
Transcriptions
Standard Mandarin
- Hanyu Pinyin: Zhōnghuá Zhíyè Jiàoyù Shè

The China Vocational Education Association (CVEA) is a people's organization dedicated to promoting vocational education.

Established in Shanghai on May 6, 1917, the founders included Huang Yanpei, Cai Yuanpei, Liang Qichao, Zhang Jian, Song Hanzhang, and 48 additional individuals. The objectives of the association were to promote individuality, equip individuals for employment, prepare them to contribute to society, and enhance productivity for the nation and the world; to provide jobs for the unemployed, enabling those employed to find fulfillment in their work. The society's objectives were to promote individuality, equip individuals for employment, prepare them to contribute to society, and enhance national and global productivity; additionally, to facilitate job acquisition for the unemployed and ensure job satisfaction for those currently employed. In 1941, CVES contributed to the establishment of the China Democratic League. In 2004, CVES joined the non-governmental organizations affiliated with the United Nations Department of Public Information (DPI). In 2010, CVES attained consultative status as a member of the NGOs associated with the Economic and Social Council of the United Nations.

== History ==
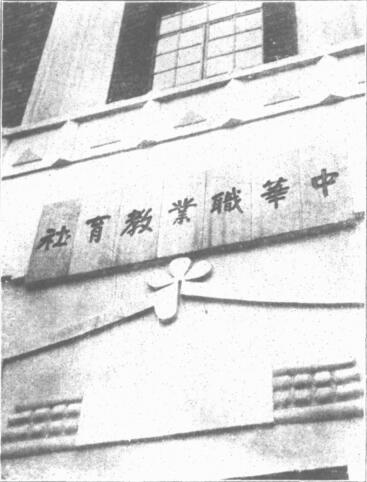
The Gate of China Vocational Education Association in Shanghai in 1934

Initially, the Chinese Vocational Education Society utilized the grounds of the Jiangsu Provincial Education Hall located at the Fangxie intersection of Lin Yin Road, adjacent to the west gate of Shanghai, for its office. Subsequently, due to the advancement of many initiatives, the organizing committee of the Society solicited funding to construct a new edifice. The committee was presided over by Qian Yongming and comprised 17 members, including Xu Qiusi and Huang Yanpei. After years of diligent effort, they have successfully acquired the intersection of Hualong Road and Huanlong Road (now Yandang Road 80), with deed inventory number 2823, including an area of 5 minutes and 2 millimeters. Design a five-story building in the Spanish architectural style. The construction funds and financing amount to approximately 50,000 taels of silver, primarily sourced from loans, with a portion derived from community donations. Construction commenced on August 7, 1929, and was finished on July 20, 1930. Zou Taofen managed the circulation department and editorial office of Life Weekly on the ground level, which has the capacity to accommodate two hundred individuals. Biluo Hall, plaque inscribed by Ma Xiangbo.

Upon the conclusion of the institute's construction, the facility emerged as a hub for work activities and the liaison center for the Chinese Vocational Training Association. Cai Yuanpei, Wang Yunwu, Tao Xingzhi, Zhang Naiqi, Shu Xincheng, and Du Zhongyuan made remarks at this location. Dong Zhujun established the Jinjiang Tea Room on the ground floor, and in January 1946, the Preparatory Committee of the Shanghai Branch of the China Democratic League was formed here, holding its inaugural meeting in November. In August 1946, Bile High School, initiated by the China Vocational Education Society, was also established in this building.

Following the establishment of the People's Republic of China, the China Vocational Education Society relocated its headquarters to Beijing and established a Shanghai Branch, continuing to operate from its old location at 80 Yandang Road. In 1984 and 1988, it founded the Zhonghua Employees' Middle School and the Shanghai Zhonghua Vocational College, respectively.

== Organization ==
=== Internal organization ===
The CVEA has the following internal organization:

- Office
- Research Department
- Department of Social Services
- Organization and Publicity Department
- Liaison Department

=== Chairman ===
1. Qian Yongming (March 1943 – September 1950)
2. Huang Yanpei (September 1950 – December 1965)
3. Hu Juewen (May 1983 – May 1989)
4. Sun Qimeng (May 1989 – November 1999)
5. Cheng Siwei (November 1999 – August 2009)
6. Zhang Rongming (August 2009 – December 2014)
7. Chen Changzhi (December 2014 – February 2019)
8. Hao Mingjin (February 2019 – )
