= Gexian Lake Park =

Park in Jurong, Jiangsu, China

- 葛仙湖公园
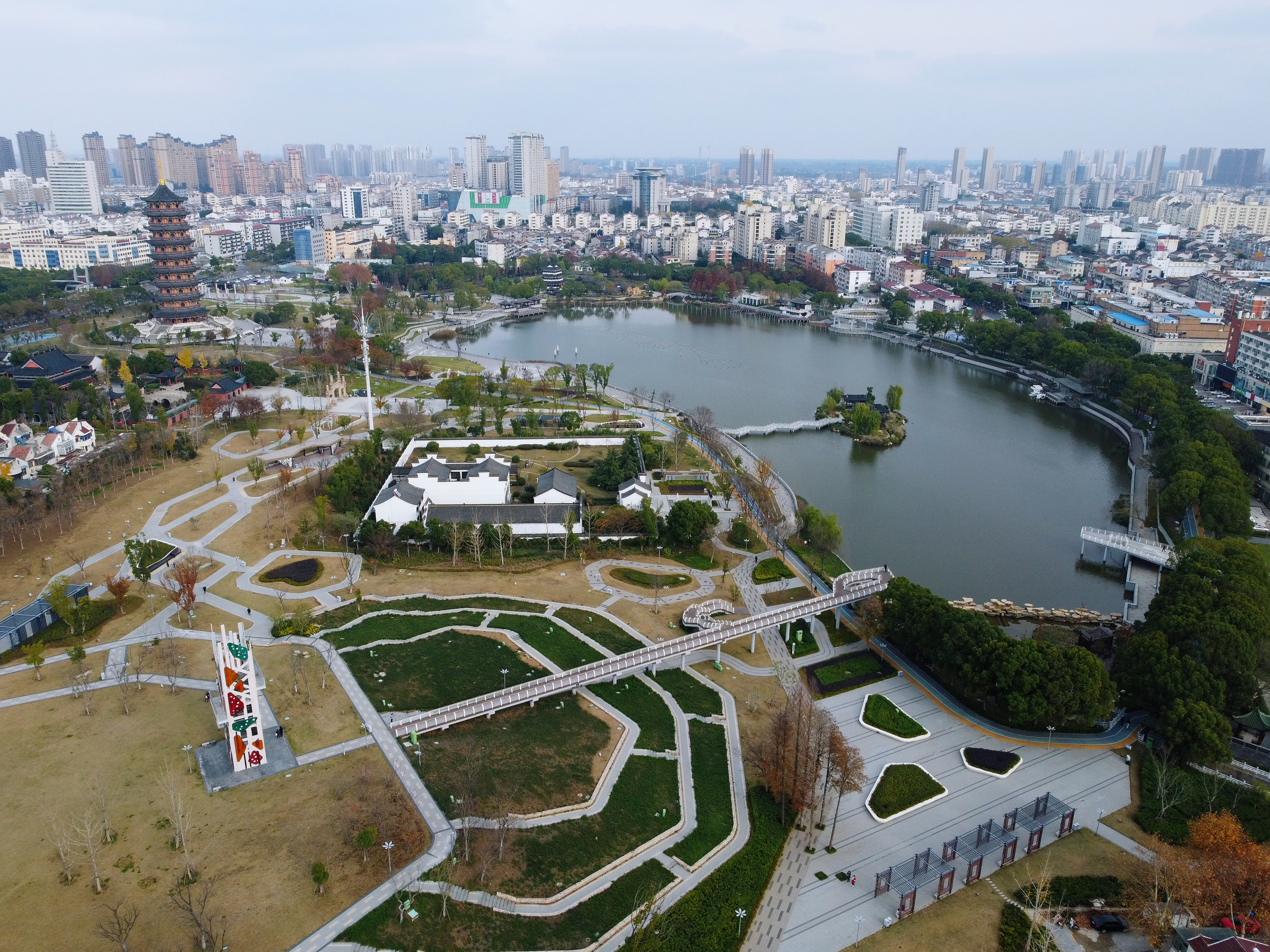
- Aerial photography of Gexian Lake Park
- Interactive map of Gexian Lake Park
- Type: City Park
- Location: Jurong City, Zhenjiang, Jiangsu Province, China
- Coordinates: 31.944684°N 119.160405°E
- Status: Open year-round
- Public transit: Jurong Bus No.5, 10, and 11

Gexian Lake Park（Chinese: 葛仙湖公园, romanized: Gě Xiān Hú Gōng Yuán）is an urban park located in the city center of Jurong City, Zhenjiang, Jiangsu Province, China. It is bounded by Huayang West Road to the north and Renmin Road to the south. The park derives its name from the legendary Eastern Jin Dynasty (317–420 AD) Taoist physician and alchemist, Ge Hong (葛洪, 283–343 AD), who is said to have practiced alchemy (refining elixirs) within the area and subsequently ascended to immortality. Previously known as Guoxitang (郭西塘) and Huayang Park (华阳公园), it was renamed in his honor. Gexian Lake forms the central feature of the park and is hydrologically connected to the Yuqing River (玉清河) system within Jurong. A popular recreational destination for local residents, the park also serves as a frequent venue for cultural and community events. In late 2013, it was officially designated and upgraded as a "Health-Themed Park". Its primary ornamental flora is the Hall's crabapple (Malus halliana), which blooms profusely from late March to early April.

== Major Structures ==
Gexian Lake Park features several significant structures, including the Dasheng Pagoda (大圣塔), Gexian Taoist Temple (葛仙观), Huayang Academy (华阳书院), and Santai Pavilion (三台阁). The Dasheng Pagoda stands 89 meters tall with ten stories and serves as a landmark for Jurong City, as well as the tallest structure within the park. Historically, a Dasheng Pagoda was first constructed during the Xianning era (275-280 AD) of the Western Jin Dynasty and remained a prominent local landmark for centuries. During the Republican era (1912-1949), the original brick-and-wood pagoda was destroyed by fire, and its remaining ruins were completely demolished in the latter half of the 20th century. The current pagoda is a reconstruction built within Gexian Lake Park in the spring of 2002. The Gexian Taoist Temple was originally founded in the seventh year of the Tianjian era (508 AD) during the Liang Dynasty. The original structure no longer exists; the present temple was reconstructed within the park on October 26, 2004. Annually, the temple hosts a New Year Bell Ringing and Blessing Ceremony. This event incorporates traditional Taoist elements such as incense burning and prayers, Taoist music performances, religious services, bell-ringing rituals, fireworks displays, and the "Baisui" (拜太岁) ritual of worshiping the Year's Guardian Deity. The Huayang Academy was established in the 23rd year of the Wanli era (1595 AD) during the Ming Dynasty by Li Chunfang (李春芳), a Zhuangyuan (top imperial examination scholar). Its original site was located within what is now Jurong No. 2 Middle School. The academy buildings were destroyed during warfare in the Xianfeng era (1851-1861) of the Qing Dynasty. In the fourth year of the Tongzhi era (1865), the county magistrate Zhou Guangdou (周光斗) purchased private residences and converted them into a replacement academy. In the autumn of the 29th year of the Guangxu era (1903), the Jurong County Government First Higher Primary School (句容官立第一高等小学堂) was founded at the Huayang Academy site. In 2003, the remaining academy structures were relocated in their entirety to Gexian Lake Park.

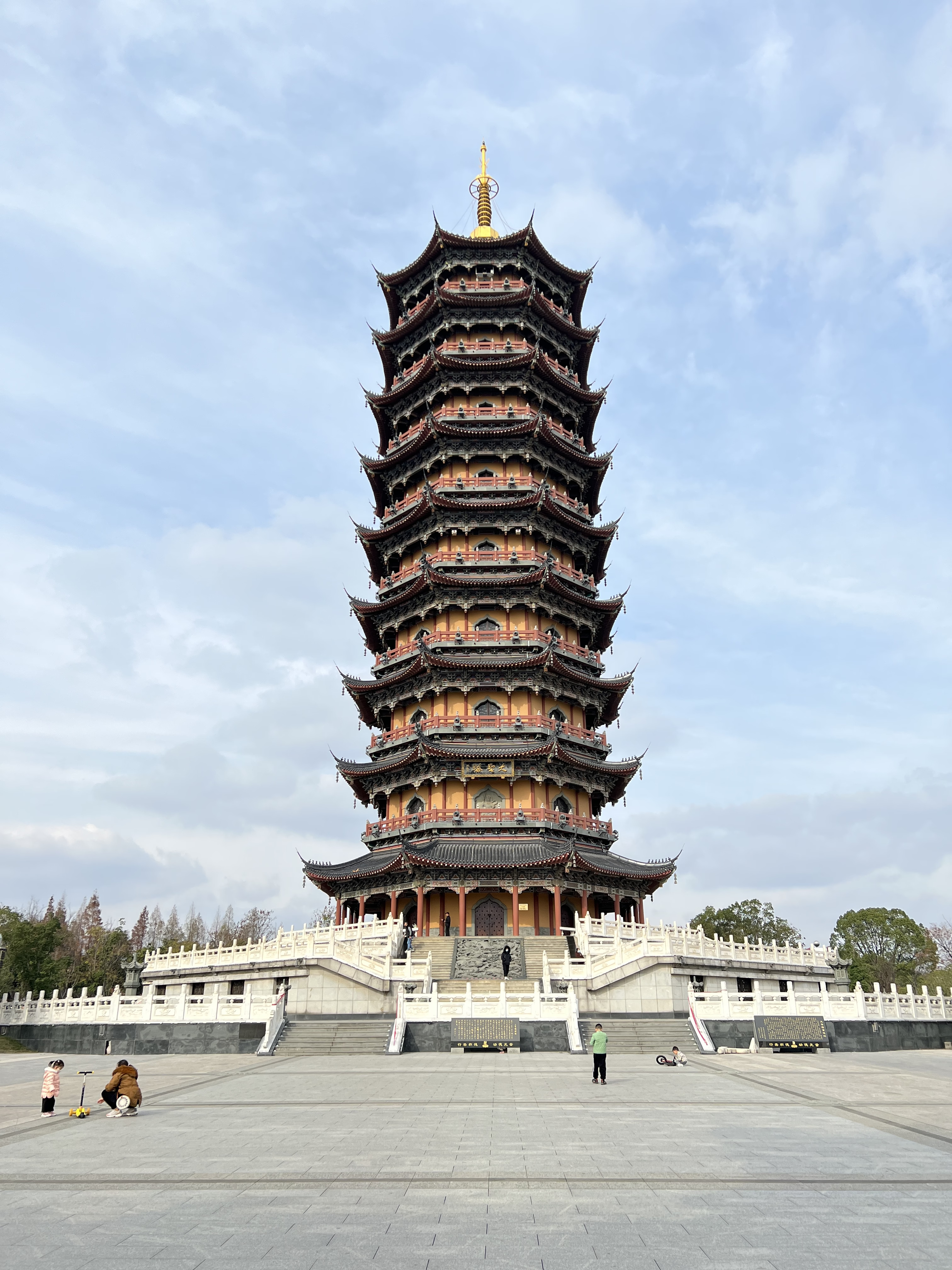
Dasheng Pagoda

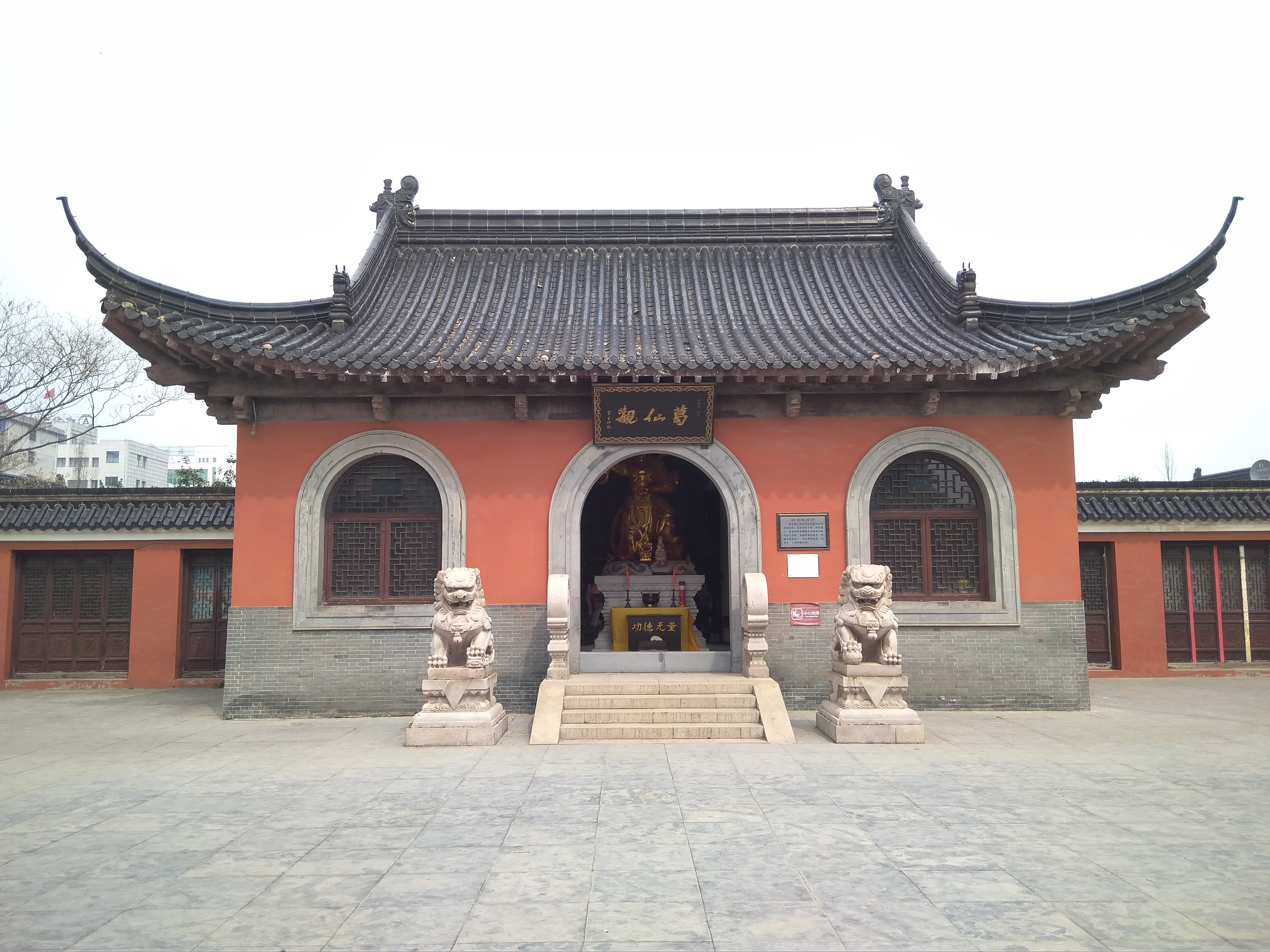
Gexian Taoist Temple

== Development History ==
Gexian Lake Park was previously known successively as Guoxitang (郭西塘) and Huayang Park (华阳公园) before adopting its current name.

In July 2011, the Municipal Gardens Department replenished Gexian Lake with approximately 230,000 cubic meters of water diverted from the Xiaogan River (肖杆河), significantly improving the lake's hydrological conditions. April 2012, the same department undertook renovation work on multiple turf areas within the park. During 2016, the Jurong Urban Management Bureau integrated water environment remediation efforts with the national civilized city campaign and comprehensive urban environmental improvement initiatives, completing an upgrade of the landscape along the Yuqing River (玉清河).。

A major renovation project for Gexian Lake Park commenced in 2019. Upon completion, the park's overall landscape structure is designed to feature "three platforms, three pathways, one belt, and eight scenic spots" (三台三道一带八景). This includes elements such as a city viewing terrace, waterfront leisure walkways, lakeside sports paths, shaded promenades, a cultural leisure sightseeing belt, the Baofu Platform (抱负台), Jiqing Square (集庆广场), and the Silk Road Flower Belt (丝路花带). The project was scheduled for completion by the end of September 2020.

== Cultural Activities ==
Gexian Lake Park serves as a primary venue for cultural events within Jurong City.

On October 15, 2011, a performance titled "Singing for Jurong" (放歌句容), part of the city's campaign to become a provincial-level civilized city, was held at Maoshan Scenic Area and Gexian Lake Park, organized by the Municipal Publicity Department and the Maoshan Scenic Area Management Committee.

A performance named "Harmonious Military Retirement, Blooming Brighter" (和谐军休花更红), celebrating the 87th anniversary of the founding of the People's Liberation Army and hosted by the Jurong Military Retirees Service Center and Jianxin Community, took place in the park on July 26, 2014. This was followed the next year on the evening of July 28, 2015, by the second iteration of the "Harmonious Military Retirement, Blooming Brighter" performance, commemorating the 88th Army anniversary and the 70th anniversary of victory in the Second Sino-Japanese War.

The "Enjoy Jurong, Engage with Civility" (畅享句曲·文明有约) cultural evening and opening ceremony for the second Mass Culture and Art Festival, jointly organized by the Jurong Municipal Publicity Department, the Culture and Tourism Bureau, and other units, was held at the park on May 27, 2017.

In late May 2018, Chongming Sub-district's Family Planning Association, along with the Hebin and Jiacheng Community Family Planning Associations, jointly hosted a cultural evening titled "Members Serve the Party, Achieve Merits in the New Era" (会员心向党建功新时代) in the park, celebrating the 38th anniversary of the Family Planning Association. Later that year, on the evening of October 13, 2018, the Municipal Federation of Literary and Art Circles Poetry Association organized the "Echoes of Classics – Jurong City's Fifth Golden Autumn Poetry Recitation" (经典的回声——句容市第五届金秋诗歌朗诵会) at the park, attracting nearly a thousand spectators.

== Exhibitions ==
Between September 28 and October 2, 2010, the Gexian Temple hosted the Jinling·Jurong Calligraphy Joint Exhibition. The exhibition featured 110 calligraphy works, over 80 of which were specially created for the event by artists from Nanjing and Jurong.

== Sports Activities ==
On the morning of May 6, 2017, Gexian Lake Park hosted the launch ceremony for the "Ten Thousand Steps Challenge" (万步有约) incentive competition for occupational groups. The ceremony was attended by over 300 participants forming 35 teams from 25 organizations. Concluding the ceremony, all participants, led by attending officials, embarked on a practical walking session consisting of four laps around the park.

== Gallery ==
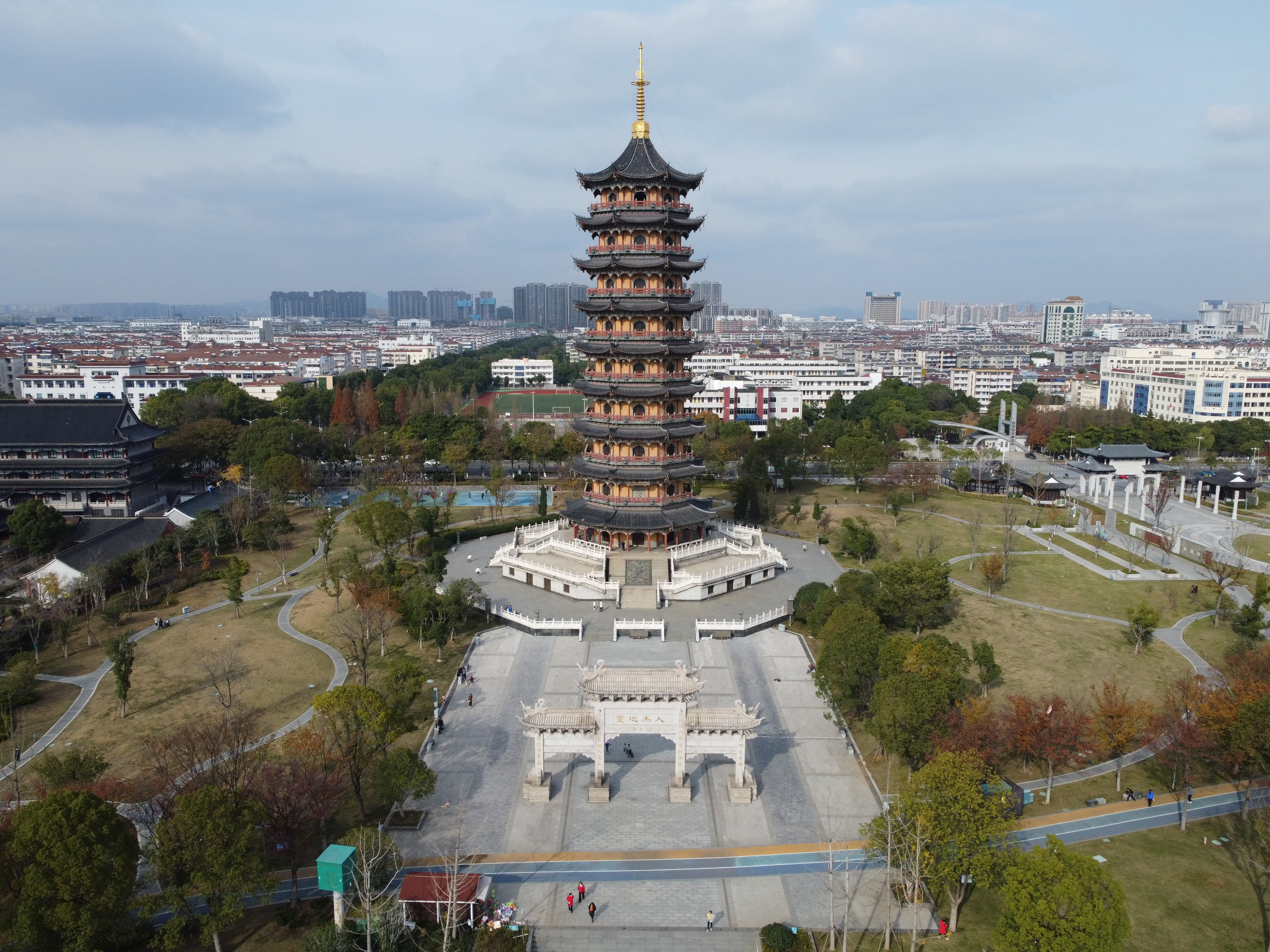
Dasheng Pagoda

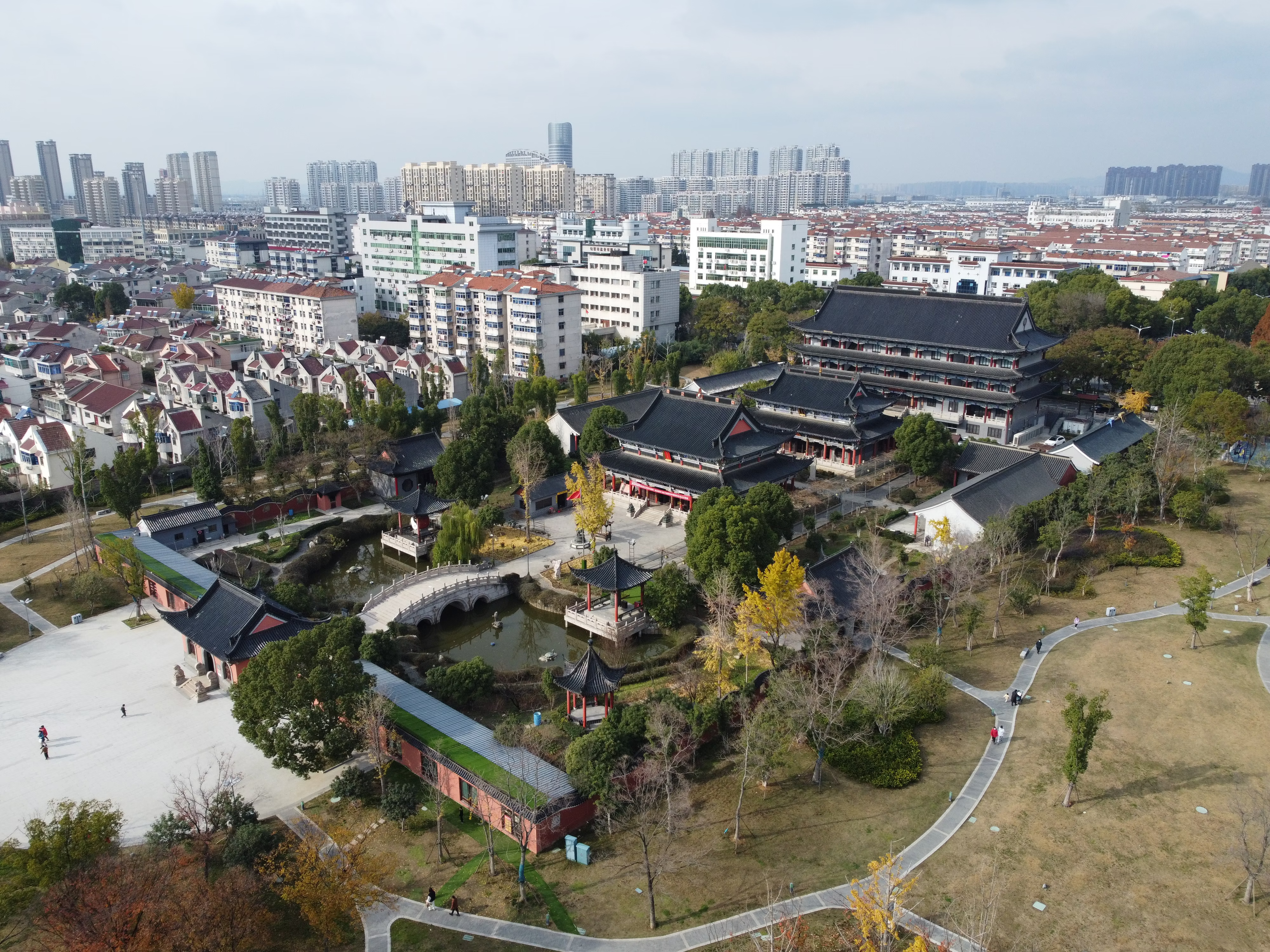
Gexian Taoist Temple

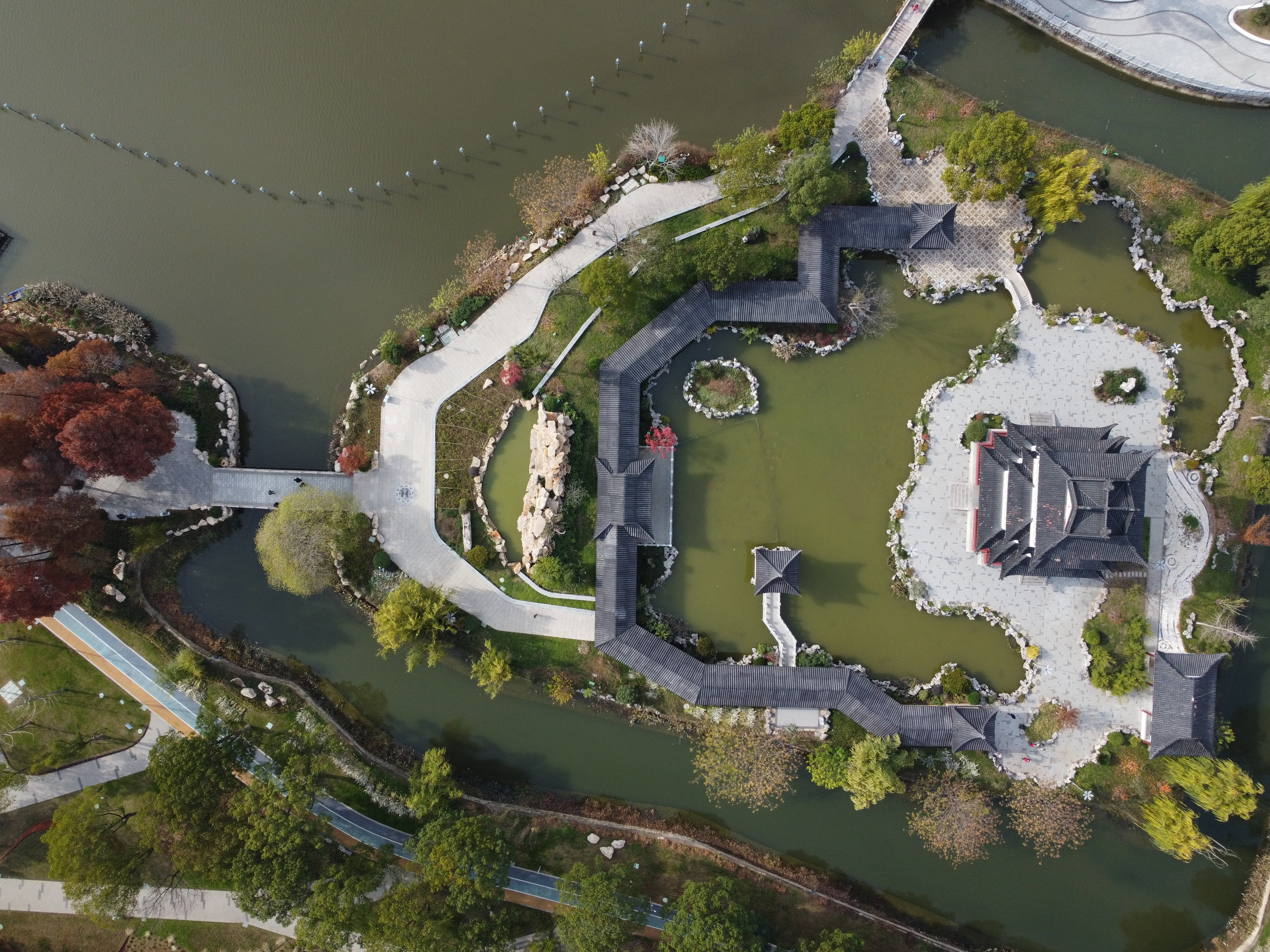
Aerial photography

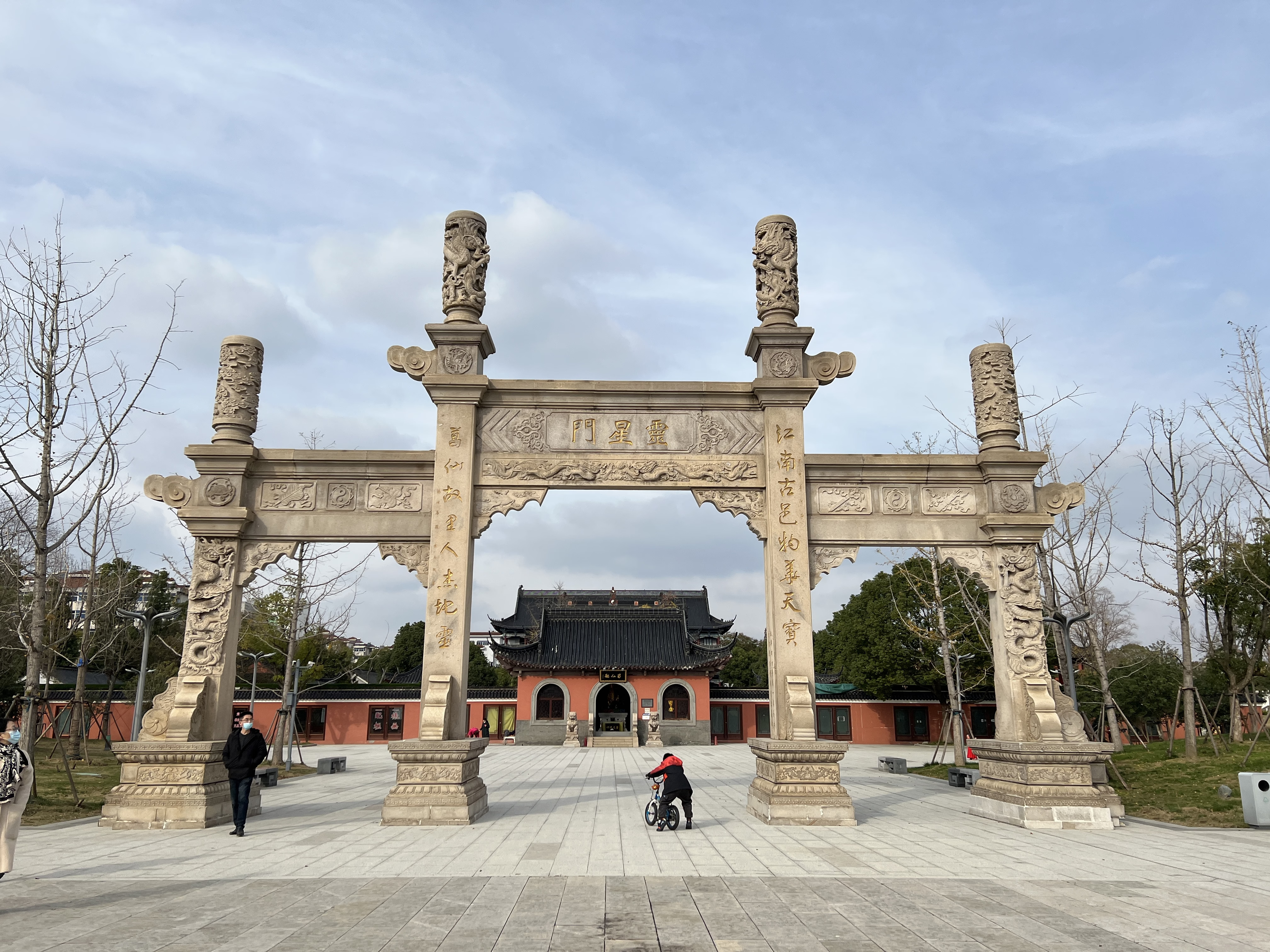
Lingxing Gate

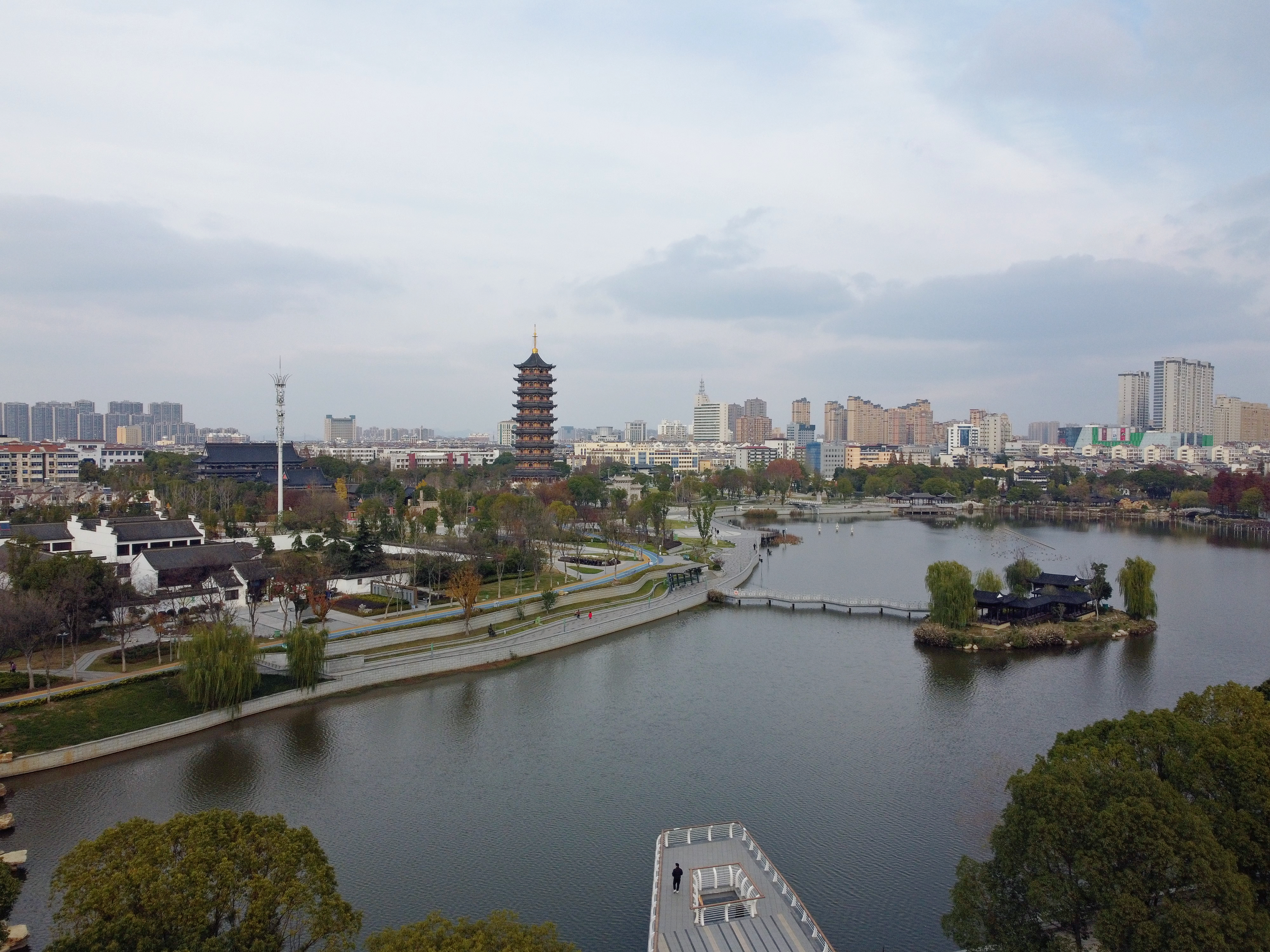
Gexian Lake

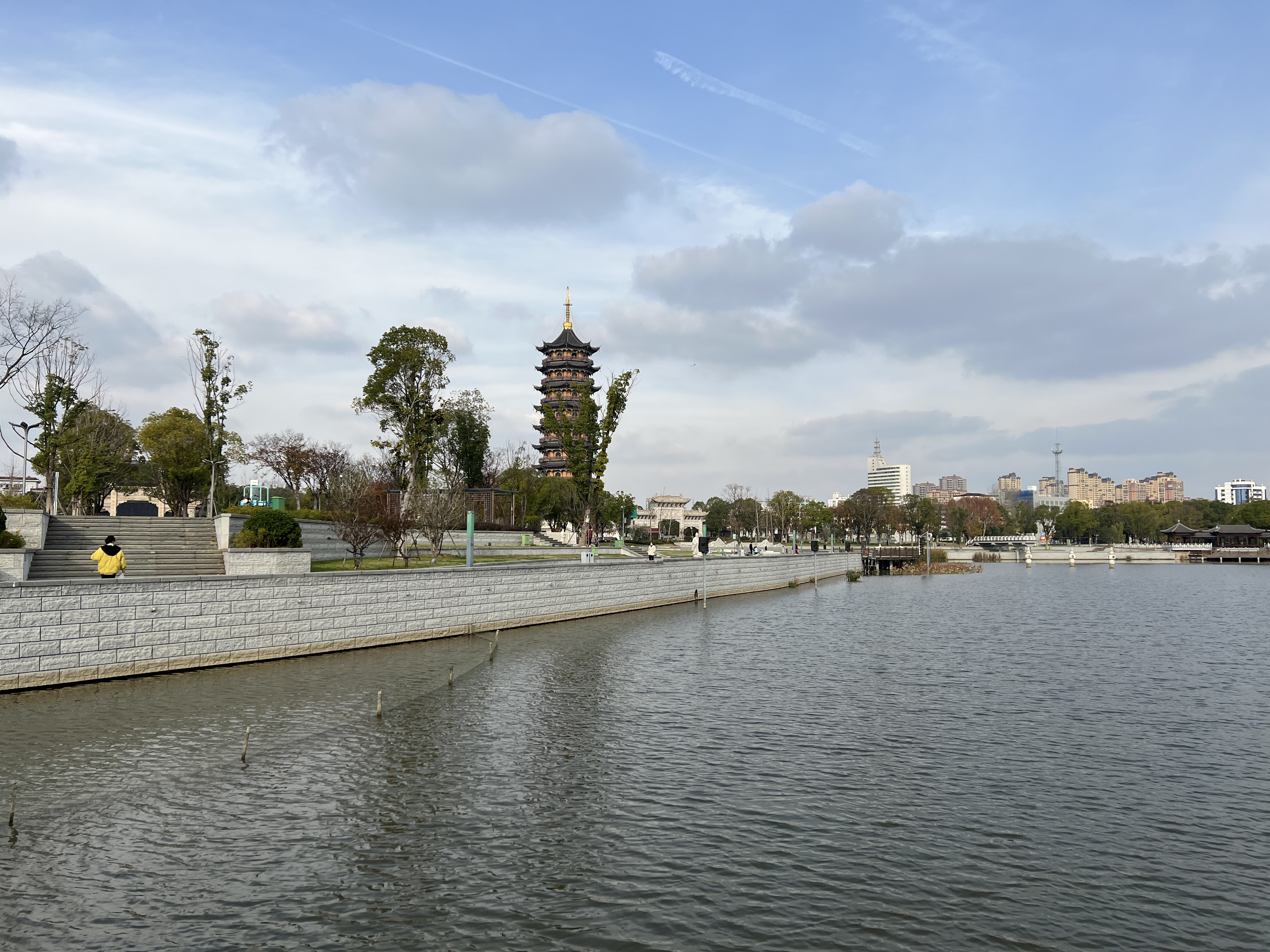
Gexian Lake
