= Changde First Middle School =

- 常德市第一中學
- 207 Langzhou Road, Wuling District; Changde, People's Republic of China, Hunan

Information
- School type: Public school
- Motto: Esteem Diligence Viliancy Integrity
- Established: 1902
- Grades: 10 - 12
- Gender: Co-educational
- Campus: Urban
- Colour: Purple

Changde First Middle School (Chinese: 常德市第一中學), or First High School of Changde, is a high school located in, Changde, Hunan, People's Republic of China. The school was founded in 1902 by Xiong Xiling, who was the first Finance Minister of Republic of China. It has been a prominent high school in Hunan since its establishment, especially reputable for cultivation of revolutionaries and politicians during the turbulent years of 20th century.

== History ==
In 1902, Xiong Xiling, a Hunan-born industrialist and reformer, founded the Western Normal College (西路師範講習所) to provide modern education for local youths in Northwestern Hunan. It was transformed to a provincial secondary school in the era of Republic of China, and renamed to Changde First Middle School in April 1953 after the communist takeover. The school campus used to be the manor of Zhu Yizhen (zh:朱翊鉁), a prince in Ming Dynasty.

== Notable people ==
=== Educators ===
- Xiong Xiling (熊希齡) - Founder of the school
- Shen Kejia (沈克家) - Former Headmaster and teacher of English. He held a degree in English from Peking University and was fluent in several foreign languages
- Yu Jiaxi (zh:余嘉錫) - Former teacher of Chinese, Academician at Academia Sinica

=== Alumni ===
- Sung Chiao-jen (宋教仁) - Republican revolutionary, founder and first president of Kuomintang
- Jiang Yiwu (zh:蔣翊武) - Republican revolutionary, Commander-in-Chief of Xinhai Revolution
- Qin Zhen (覃振) - Republican revolutionary, former vice president of Legislative Yuan, Nationalist Government (Republic of China)
- Jian Bozan (翦伯贊) - Historian, former vice president of Peking University
- Lin Boqu (林伯渠) - Communist revolutionary, former vice chairman of Standing Committee of the National People's Congress
- Su Yu (粟裕) - Communist revolutionary, former commander of People's Liberation Army
- Teng Daiyuan (滕代遠) - Communist revolutionary, former commander of People's Liberation Army
- Li Zhuchen (zh:李燭塵) - Chemist, former vice president of Chinese People's Political Consultative Conference
- Xin Shuzhi (zh:辛樹幟) - Agriculturalist, former president of Lanzhou University
- Wu Bixia (吴碧霞) - Professor of the China Conservatory of Music
