= Pu Jiexiu =

Chinese politician

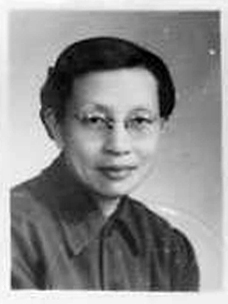

Delegate to the National People's Congress

Personal details
- Born: November 1907
- Died: 13 January 2000 (aged 92)
- Party: Chinese Communist Party
- Other political affiliations: China National Democratic Construction Association

Pu Jiexiu (Chinese: 浦洁修 ; November 1907 - 13 January 2000) was a Chinese entrepreneur and former Vice Chair of the Central Committee of the China National Democratic Construction Association.

== Biography ==
Pu Jiexiu graduated in chemistry from Beijing Normal University in 1931. She then served as a teacher in a number of schools in the Beijing area. In 1932 she completed further study of Chemistry in Germany at Darmstadt university of technology and Dresden University of Technology. On return to China she served as acting director of the Department of Chemistry at Peking Private University.

In the late 1930s she was involved in the organisations of the Chinese Women's Friendship Association. In 1946 she worked as an engineer in Beiping (the then-name of Beijing) at Peiping Industrial Laboratory and later became the manager of the Peiping Zhenbei Tanning Company.

In the 1940s Jiexiu continued to hold managerial posts in tanning companies in Beijing and was appointed to a number of directorships including of local Women's Federations and the Beijing Grain Bureau. In 1949, Pu Jiexiu joined the China National Democratic Construction Association, one of eight legally recognised political parties in China. She held a number of positions within the party including as its vice-chair. She also joined the Chinese Communist Party in 1991.

During the Anti-Rightist Campaign in 1957 Jiexiu denounced her sister Pu Xixiu - a journalist with Wenhui Bao - of being 'a rightist'.

From 1979 to 1993 Pu Jiexiu served as the deputy director of the Standing Committee of the People's Congress of Beijing. She was also a deputy to the National People's Congress between 1954 and 1998.

She died in Beijing in 2000 at the age of 92.
