= People's organization =

Organizations in the CCP's united front

- Traditional Chinese: 人民團體
- Simplified Chinese: 人民团体
Transcriptions
Standard Mandarin
- Hanyu Pinyin: Rénmín tuántǐ

People's organization is a generic term for organizations in the People's Republic of China excluding governments, the official departments of government, and state-owned enterprises or institutions, yet are recognized to be a part of Chinese Communist Party's united front.

== List of people's organizations ==
=== Represented at the Chinese People's Political Consultative Conference ===
English name	Chinese name	Founded in/on	Top leaders				
English name	Chinese name	Founded in/on	Name	Birthdate	Party	Introduction	Ref.
All-China Federation of Trade Unions	中华全国总工会	1 May 1925	Wang Dongming	July 1956 (age 69)	CCP		
Communist Youth League of China	中国共产主义青年团	August 1922	A Dong	November 1970 (age 55)	CCP		
All-China Women's Federation	中华全国妇女联合会	24 March 1949	Shen Yiqin	December 1959 (age 66)	CCP	Female	
China Association for Science and Technology	中国科学技术协会	September 1958	Wan Gang	August 1952 (age 73)	CZGP	Professor of car engineering, also the Minister of Science and Technology	
All-China Federation of Returned Overseas Chinese	中华全国归国华侨联合会	12 October 1956	Wan Lijun	July 1957 (age 68)	CCP	Overseas Chinese back from Japan	
All-China Federation of Taiwan Compatriots	中华全国台湾同胞联谊会	27 December 1981	Ji Bin	August 1966 (age 59)	TDSL	Taiwan-born politician	
All-China Youth Federation	中华全国青年联合会	4 May 1949	Xu Xiao	August 1972 (age 53)	CCP		
All-China Federation of Industry and Commerce	中华全国工商业联合会	October 1953	Gao Yunlong	December 1958 (age 67)	CNDCA		

=== Other people's organizations ===
English name	Chinese name	Founded in/on	Top leaders				
English name	Chinese name	Founded in/on	Name	Birthdate	Party	Introduction	Ref.
China Federation of Literary and Art Circles	中国文学艺术界联合会	19 July 1949	Tie Ning	September 1957 (age 68)	CCP	Famous writer, acting since 1975	
China Writers Association	中国作家协会	23 July 1947	Tie Ning	September 1957 (age 68)	CCP	Famous writer, acting since 1975	
China Law Society	中国法学会	June 1949	Wang Chen	December 1950 (age 75)	CCP	Former Vice Chairman of the NPC Standing Committee	
Chinese People's Association for Friendship with Foreign Countries	中国人民对外友好协会	3 May 1954	Yang Wanming	March 1964 (age 62)	CCP	Former Chinese Ambassador to Brazil	
All-China Journalists Association	中华全国新闻工作者协会	February 1957	He Ping	January 1957 (age 69)	CCP	Former President of the Xinhua News Agency	
China Council for the Promotion of International Trade	中国国际贸易促进委员会	May 1952	Ren Hongbin	July 1966 (age 59)	CCP	Former Vice Minister of Commerce	
China Disabled Persons' Federation	中国残疾人联合会	11 March 1988	Cheng Kai	November 1964 (age 61)	CCP		
Red Cross Society of China	中国红十字会总会	10 March 1904	Chen Zhu	August 1953 (age 72)	CPWDP	Molecular biologist, former Minister of Health	
Chinese People's Institute of Foreign Affairs	中国人民外交学会	15 December 1949	Wang Chao	April 1960 (age 66)	CCP		
China Soong Ching Ling Foundation	中国宋庆龄基金会	29 May 1982	Li Bin	October 1954 (age 71)	CCP	Former Minister of the National Health and Family Planning Commission	
Alumni Association of Huangpu Military Academy	黄埔军校同学会	16 June 1984	Lin Shangyuan	February 1924 (age 102)	RCCK	The eighteenth batch student of Huangpu Military Academy	
Western Returned Scholars Association	欧美同学会	October 1913	Ding Zhongli	January 1957 (age 69)	CDL		
Chinese Society of Ideological and Political Work	中国思想政治工作研究会	18 January 1983	Li Shulei	January 1964 (age 62)	CCP	Head of the Propaganda Department of the Chinese Communist Party	
China Vocational Education Association	中华职业教育社	6 May 1917	Hao Mingjin	December 1956 (age 69)	CNDCA		
China Family Planning Association	中国计划生育协会	29 May 1980	Wang Gang	October 1942 (age 83)	CCP	Former Member of the Politburo of the Chinese Communist Party	

== See also ==
- Chinese People's Political Consultative Conference
- Corporatism
- Government-organized non-governmental organization
