= Threadneedle Book Bureau =

State-owned publishing house in China

Threadneedle Book Bureau (Chinese: 线装书局), also known as Thread-Binding Books Publishing House (TBPH), is a Chinese publisher. Founded in 1993, it has published books printed on Xuan paper including Mao Zedong’s Commentaries on the Twenty-Four Histories. It is sponsored by the China Publishing Association.
