= CFPA =

CFPA may refer to:

- Connecticut Forest and Park Association
- Consumer Finance Protection Agency, an independent agency of the United States government
- CKTG-FM, Canadian radio station launched as CFPA in 1944
- Concordville Fire & Protective Association, a fire and rescue department in Concordville, PA
- China Foundation for Poverty Alleviation, an international humanitarian organization headquartered in Beijing
- China Family Planning Association, a family planning organization in China
