= Central Institute of Socialism =

Chinese government-affiliated school

- 中央社会主义学院
- Other name: Chinese Culture Institute
- Former name: Institute of Socialism (社会主义学院)
- Type: Higher education institution Ministerial level agency
- Established: 1956; 70 years ago
- Parent institution: United Front Work Department
- President: Hao Mingjin (CNDCA)
- Location: No. 4, Wanshou Temple, Haidian District, Beijing, China
- Campus: Urban
- Website: www.zysy.org.cn
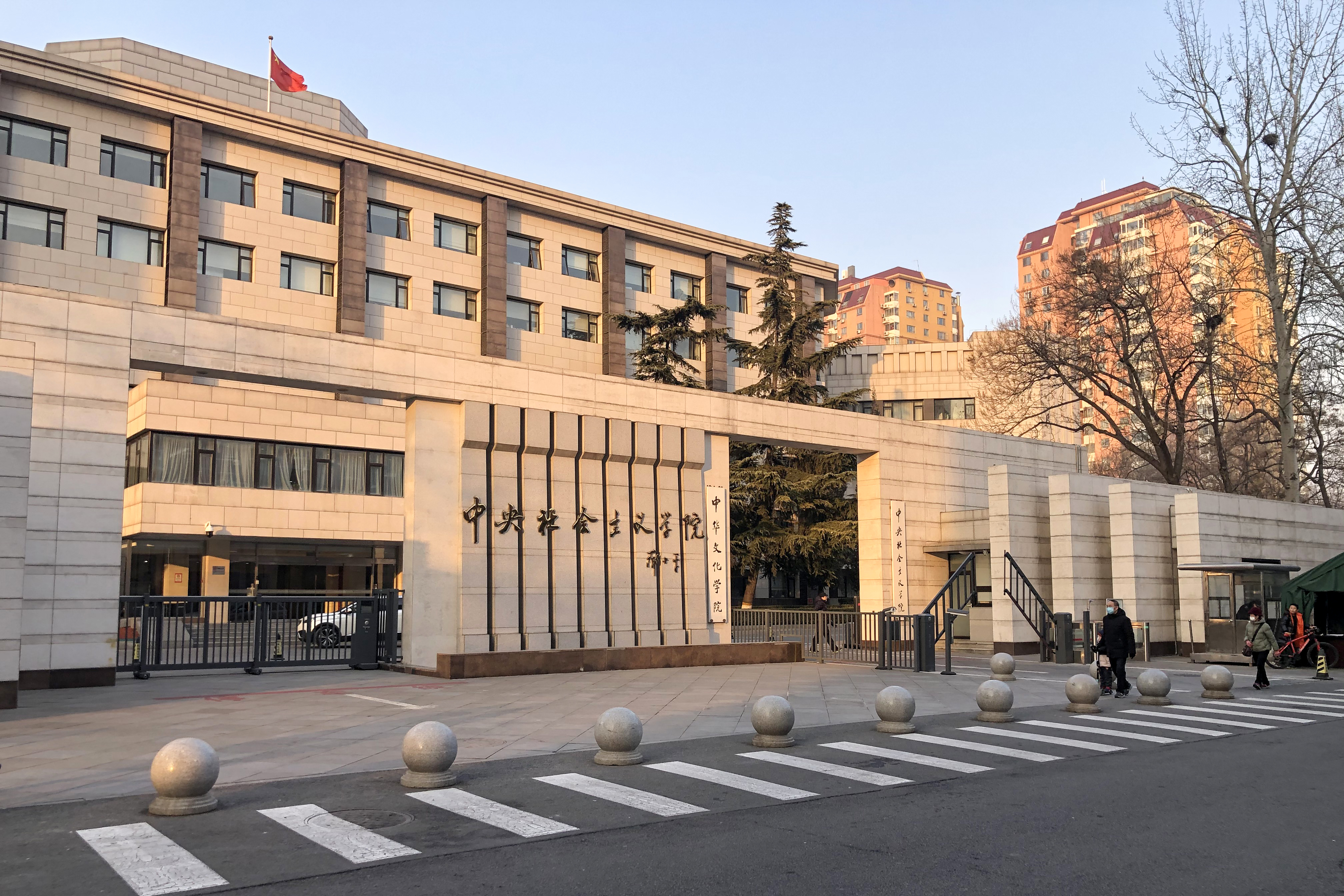

Chinese name
- Simplified Chinese: 中央社会主义学院
- Traditional Chinese: 中央社會主義學院
Transcriptions
Standard Mandarin
- Hanyu Pinyin: Zhōngyāng Shèhuìzhǔyì Xuéyuàn

Abbreviation
- Simplified Chinese: 中央社院
- Traditional Chinese: 中央社院
Transcriptions
Standard Mandarin
- Hanyu Pinyin: Zhōngyāng Shénshè

Former name
- Simplified Chinese: 社会主义学院
- Traditional Chinese: 社會主義學院
Transcriptions
Standard Mandarin
- Hanyu Pinyin: Shèhuìzhǔyì Xuéyuàn

The Central Institute of Socialism (CIS) is the higher education institution in China which trains cadres from the eight minor political parties and those not affiliated with any political parties. A united front organ, it is organized by the United Front Work Department of the Central Committee of the Chinese Communist Party. It is located in Beijing.

== History ==
In 1956, following the establishment of the Central Party School and the Communist Youth League School, the institute was established for the eight minor political parties.

On 18 July 1960, due to the various establishments of "Schools of Socialism" throughout China, the original school was renamed to the Central Institute of Socialism.

On 10 July 1965, all the cadres of the Institute were sent to the countryside to participate in the Socialist Education Movement, leading the college to suspend enrollment. During the Cultural Revolution, the Institute closed down, not being reopened until February 1982.

In early 1997, the CCP Central Committee approved of the establishment of the Chinese Culture Institute (中华文化学院) as an external name of the Central Institute of Socialism.

== Functions ==
The Central Institute of Socialism is a united front college that trains non-CCP cadres from the eight minor political parties, as well as those not affiliated with any parties.

== Organization ==
The Central Institute of Socialism is a public institution under the CCP Central Committee managed by the United Front Work Department.

=== Presidents ===
1. Wu Yuzhang (1956–1965)
2. Sun Xiaocun (1982–1991)
3. Yang Jike (29 June 1991–1999)
4. He Luli (1999–2008)
5. Yan Junqi (2008–2019)
6. Hao Mingjin (2019–present)
