= China Publishing Association =

Chinese people's organization

The China Publishing Association (CPA, Chinese: 中国出版协会) is a national people's organization for professionals from the publishing sector in China, operating under the oversight of the General Administration of Press and Publication. The organization was founded on 20 December 1979 as the Publishers Association of China (Chinese: 中国出版工作者协会) before being renamed to the China Publishing Association in May 2011.
