= Li Mo'an =

Chinese general (1904–2001)

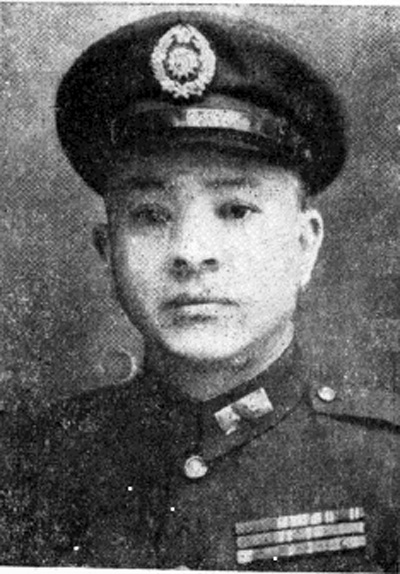
Photo of Li Mo'an in "Chinese Contemporary Celebrities" biography

Li Mo'an (Chinese: 李默庵; pinyin: Lǐ Mò'ān; October 17, 1904 – October 27, 2001) was a Kuomintang general from Changsha, Hunan. A graduate of Whampoa Military Academy's inaugural class of 1924–25, Li became a protégé of Chiang Kai-shek and rose to high-ranking command positions during the Second Sino-Japanese War and the Chinese Civil War before breaking with the Nationalist government in 1949 and settling abroad. In 1990 he returned permanently to China, where he served as chairman of the Whampoa Military Academy Alumni Association.

== Early life ==
Li (birth name Li Zongbai 李宗白) was the eldest son of a peasant family in Beishanping, near Changsha. In 1924, he entered Whampoa Military Academy, and came to be known as one of three standouts of the first class: "He Zhonghan is the scholar, Hu Zongnan the warrior, and Li Mo'an both scholar and warrior."

== Military career ==
Beginning in 1928, he was the commanding officer of the 31st Brigade. He became the Fujian Second Pacification Area commander in 1935. He was the general commanding officer of various forces from 1935 to 1941, including the 10th Division (1935–1937), and, from 1937, the 14th Army, with which he commanded the left flank at the Battle of Xinkou, one of the largest engagements of the Second Sino-Japanese War. He subsequently commanded the 33rd Army (1938–1940) and the Hunan-Hubei-Jiangxi Border Area army (1940–1941). In 1940-41 he was also deputy commander-in-chief of the 14th, 26th and 38th Army Groups. He became commander-in-chief of the 32nd Army Group (1944), and later the 3rd Front Army (1946), with which he engaged Communist forces in the Central Jiangsu campaign. In 1948, he was made commander of the Changsha Seventeenth Pacification Area. He retired from the army in 1949.

== World War II and the CBE ==
Following the outbreak of the Pacific War, Li Mo'an was appointed commander of the Chinese Surprise Troops, a formation established under a Sino-British agreement to conduct assault and sabotage operations against Japanese forces. On December 23, 1944, Louis Mountbatten, Supreme Allied Commander South East Asia, formally recommended Li Mo'an for the honorary Commander of the Order of the British Empire (CBE). The citation recognized his "distinguished service to the Allied cause."

== Retirement, later life, and return to China ==
Li retired from military service during the final stage of the Chinese Civil War. In August 1949, he signed a declaration by 44 former Nationalist figures breaking with Chiang Kai-shek. In 1951, he relocated to Argentina. Li and his wife Gu Lin moved to the United States in 1964.

In 1981, Li was invited back to mainland China to participate in the 70th-anniversary commemorations of the 1911 Revolution. After returning permanently to China in 1990, he served on the 7th and 8th National Committees of the Chinese People's Political Consultative Conference and as chairman of the Whampoa Military Academy Alumni Association, advocating for peaceful reunification of China until his death in Beijing on October 27, 2001.
