= Chinese Society of Ideological and Political Work =

United front organization

- 中国思想政治工作研究会
- Formation: January 18, 1983; 43 years ago
- Type: People's organization
- President: Li Shulei
- Affiliations: Central Propaganda Department of the Chinese Communist Party

Chinese Society of Ideological and Political Work
- Simplified Chinese: 中国思想政治工作研究会
- Traditional Chinese: 中國思想政治工作研究會
Transcriptions
Standard Mandarin
- Hanyu Pinyin: Zhōngguó Sīxiǎng Zhèngzhì Gōngzuò Yánjiū Huì

Abbreviation
- Simplified Chinese: 中国政研会
- Traditional Chinese: 中國政研會
Transcriptions
Standard Mandarin
- Hanyu Pinyin: Zhōngguó Zhèngyánhuì

Chinese Association for Culture Construction
- Simplified Chinese: 中国文化建设协会
- Traditional Chinese: 中國文化建設協會
Transcriptions
Standard Mandarin
- Hanyu Pinyin: Zhōngguó Wénhuà Jiànshè Xiéhuì

The Chinese Society of Ideological and Political Work (CSIPW), also known as the Chinese Association for Culture Construction (CACC), is a people's organization composed of Chinese Communist Party political education officials in China. It is led by Li Shulei, the Head of the Publicity Department of the Chinese Communist Party.

== History ==
The CSIPW was founded on 18 January 1983.

== Functions ==
The CSIPW organizes events to promote the ideology of the Chinese Communist Party.

== Organization ==
=== Internal organization ===
The CSIPW has the following internal organization:

- Office
- Research Department
- Liaison Department
- Training Department
- Network Department
- Ideological and Political Work Research Magazine
