= Alumni Association of Huangpu Military Academy =

Military academy alumni association

- 黄埔军校同学会
- Formation: June 16, 1984
- Type: People's organization
- Headquarters: No. 20 Zhaogongkou Community, South Third Ring Road, Fengtai, Beijing
- President: Chen Xingying
- Website: www.huangpu.org.cn

Chinese name
- Simplified Chinese: 黄埔军校同学会
- Traditional Chinese: 黃埔軍校同學會
Transcriptions
Standard Mandarin
- Hanyu Pinyin: Huángbù Jūnxiào Tóngxuéhuì

The Alumni Association of Huangpu Military Academy (AAHMA, Chinese: 黄埔军校同学会) is a people's organization composed of alumni of the Huangpu Military Academy. Dedicated to advancing Chinese unification, it was established on 16 June 1984.

== History ==
The Association was established on 16 June 1984 with the approval of the Central Committee of the Chinese Communist Party (CCP) under the leadership of Deng Xiaoping.

== Functions ==
The constitution of the Association describes it as a "non-governmental organization composed of alumni of the Huangpu Military Academy". The official purposes of the Association are to "carry forward the Whampoa spirit, connect classmates, promote the reunification of the motherland, and strive to revitalize China". It officially acts as a bridge between students from the Whampoa Academy in Taiwan and mainland China.

== Organizations ==
The Association is registered with the United Front Work Department. It has branches in every province-level division in mainland China except the Tibet Autonomous Region.

=== Internal organization ===
- Office
- Research Office
- Publicity Department
- Personnel Department
- Taiwan, Hong Kong and Macao Liaison Department
- Overseas Liaison Department
- Board of DIrectors
- Publication Editorial Department

== Leaders ==
Presidents of the Alumni Association of Huangpu Military Academy
#	Name	Took office	Left office	Experience in Huangpu
1	Xu Xiangqian	June 1984	December 1989	1st batch of students
2	Hou Jingru	December 1989	October 1999	1st batch of students
3	Li Mo'an	November 1997	October 2001	1st batch of students
4	Li Yunchang	October 2003	October 2008	4th batch of students
5-6	Lin Shangyuan	June 2009	January 2026	18th batch of students
7	Chen Xingying	January 2026	Incumbent	—N/a (Note: Her father was graduated from the 13th batch of students of the Huangpu Military Academy.)
