= Zhang Naiqi =

Chinese politician (1897–1977)

- 章乃器
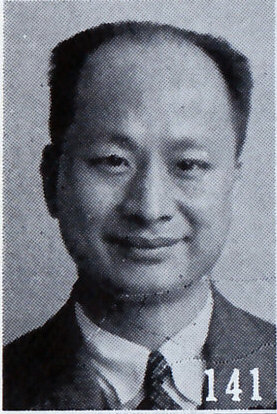
- Zhang Naiqi as pictured in The Most Recent Biographies of Chinese Dignitaries

Minister of Food of the People's Republic of China
- In office 1952–1957
- Premier: Zhou Enlai
- Preceded by: New title
- Succeeded by: Chen Guodong

Personal details
- Born: March 4, 1897 Qingtian County, Zhejiang, Qing China
- Died: May 13, 1977 (aged 80) Beijing, China
- Party: China Democratic National Construction Association
- Spouse(s): Wang Jing'e; Hu Ziying; Yang Meizhen; Sun Caiping; Wang Zhexiang
- Children: 6
- Education: Hangzhou Provincial School of Business

Zhang Naiqi (Chinese: 章乃器; pinyin: Zhāng Nǎiqì; Wade–Giles: Chang Nai-ch'i; 1897–1977) was a Chinese politician who served as Minister of Food between 1952 and 1957. He was one of the founders of the China Democratic National Construction Association.

== Biography ==
Zhang was born in Qingtian County, Zhejiang, during the late Qing dynasty, on 4 March 1897. Zhang joined the Xinhai Revolution Army in 1911. In 1913, Zhang attended Hangzhou Provincial School of Business (杭州省立甲种商业学校), after graduating, he worked in Zhejiang Industry Bank.

In 1927, Zhang set up a magazine named New Review (新评论). He wrote articles supporting the Kuomintang party. In 1935, Zhang Naiqi and Ma Xiangbo found the Shanghai Cultural of National Salvation Association (上海文化届救国会). In November 1936, Zhang was arrested by the Nationalist Government.

During the Second Sino-Japanese War (1937 – 1945), Zhang was released. Zhang served as the chief of Anhui Treasury Department. After 1945, Zhang and Huang Yanpei found the China Democratic National Construction Association.

In 1949, Zhang went to Beijing and served as an adviser to the People's Bank of China. In 1952, Zhang served as the head of the Food Department of the People's Republic of China. Zhang, Chen Shutong and Li Weihan founded the All-China Federation of Industry and Commerce in which he served as the vice chairman. From 1949 to 1954, he was the Government Administration Council of the Central People's Government member.

In 1957, Zhang Naiqi along with Zhang Bojun, Chu Anping and Luo Longji were classified as rightists. On 8 June 1957, Zhang was removed from his posts and persecuted.

On 13 May 1977, Zhang died of illness in a Beijing Hospital basement. Zhang Naiqi's memory was rehabilitated by Deng Xiaoping in 1980.

== Personal life ==
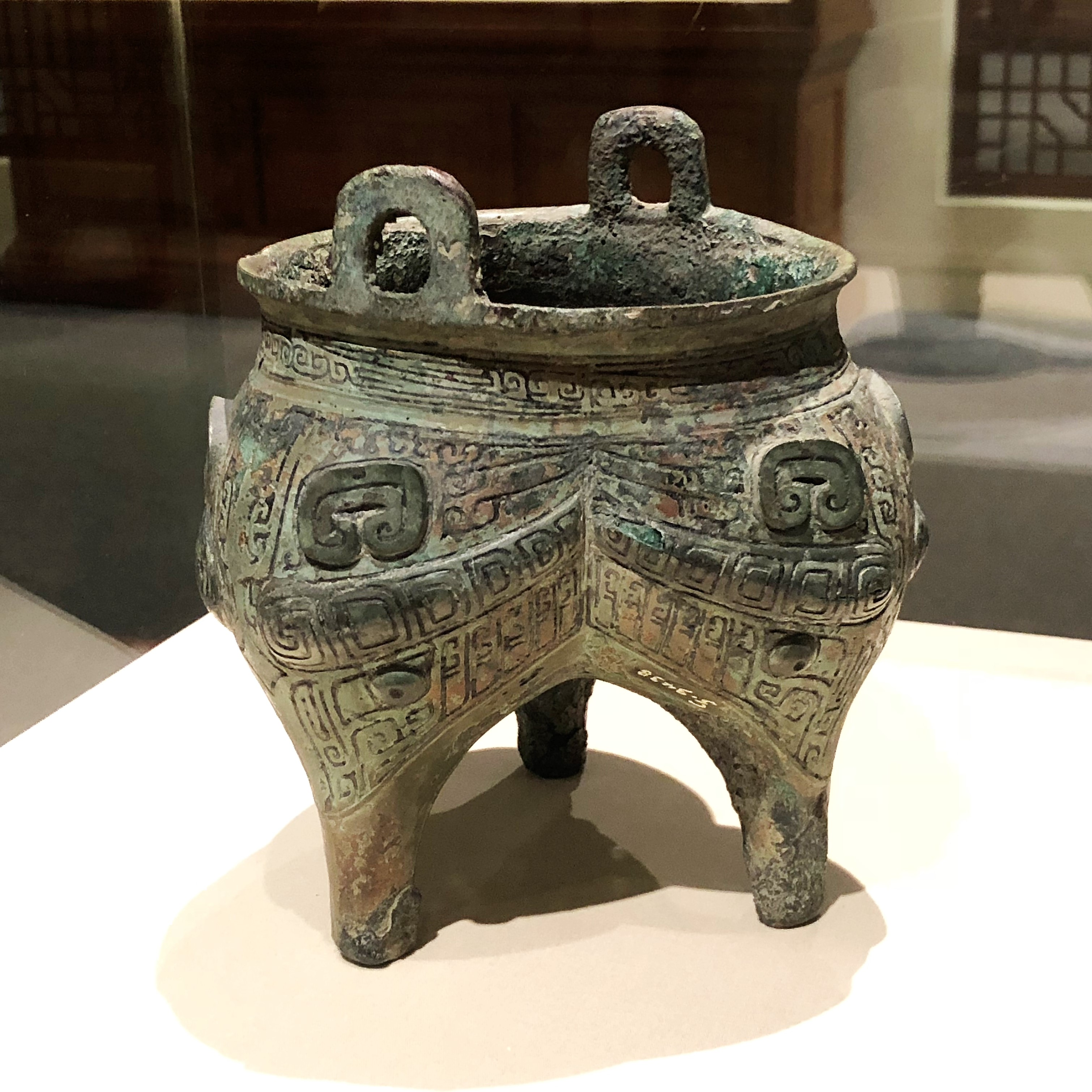
a Shang Dynasty Bronze Li (cooking vessel) donated by Zhang Naiqi to the National Museum of China.

Zhang Naiqi married four times during his life and had 8 children. He had five children (three sons and two daughters) by Wang Jing'e (蒋镜娥), one daughter by Hu Ziying (胡子婴), one daughter by Jiang Yan (蒋燕), and one son by Sun Caiping (孙彩萍).

By Jiang Jing'e:

- daughter Zhang Xianghua (章湘华)
- son Zhang Yijun (章翼军)
- daughter Zhang Wan (章畹)

By Hu Ziying:

- daughter Zhang Xianggu (章湘谷)

By Jiang Yan:

- daughter Dong Shuping (董淑萍)

By Sun Caiping:

- son Zhang Lifan

Government offices
| New title | Minister of Food; 1952–1957 | Succeeded by Chen Guodong |
