= Zhang Lifan =

- 章立凡
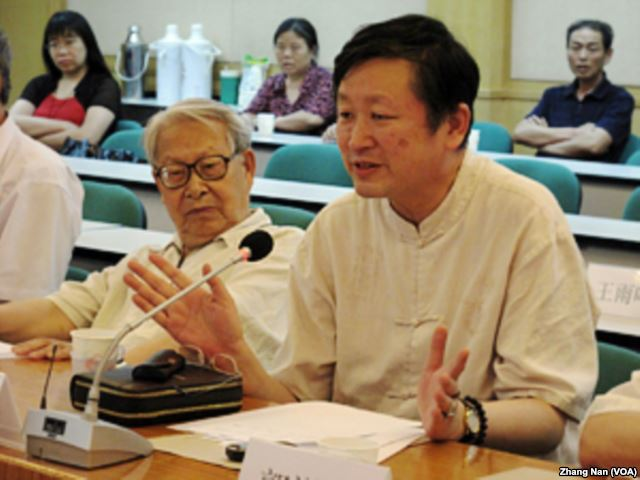
- Zhang Lifan
- Born: July 1950 (age 76); Beijing, China
- Education: Chinese Academy of Social Sciences
- Occupations: Writer, scholar, historian
- Years active: 1989–present
- Movement: Cultural Revolution
- Parent(s): Zhang Caiping; Zhang Naiqi

Zhang Lifan (Chinese: 章立凡; pinyin: Zhāng Lìfán, born July 1950), is a Chinese writer, scholar and historian.

== Biography ==
Zhang's father, Zhang Naiqi (章乃器), was one of the founders of the China National Democratic Association, Zhang's mother is Zhang Caiping (张彩萍). Zhang spent his childhood in his hometown of Beijing. He attended High School attached to Tsinghua University (清华附中). In 1957, Zhang Naiqi, Zhang Bojun (章伯钧), Chu Anping (储安平) and Luo Longji (罗隆基) were picked out as right wingers. On 8 June 1957, Zhang Naiqi was removed from his posts and taken to be prosecuted. Zhang Lifan was punished because of his father. On 13 May 1977, Zhang Naiqi died of illness in a Beijing Hospital basement. After the Cultural Revolution, Zhang Lifan was educated in the Institute of Modern History of Chinese Academy of Social Sciences (中国社科院近代史研究所).

== Views ==
Zhang Lifan is known as one of the most outspoken liberal-minded scholars in China and has often been critical of the Chinese Communist Party, which in 2013 lead to him being censored and removed from Chinese microblogging platform Sina Weibo, where he had 300k followers.

In an interview with NPR on the arrest of young Marxists fighting for workers rights, Zhang said "I think this shows China's Communist Party can no longer justify itself". Zhang said further that young Marxists in China pose a conundrum for the country's leadership, whom he says only feign interest in Marxism to "maintain a guiding principle".

In an interview with Deutsche Welle, Zhang said that the COVID-19 pandemic posed the greatest challenge in the Chinese Communist Party's 70-year history, after the Great Chinese Famine during Mao Zedong era and the Tiananmen Square Protests of 1989. Zhang said that the Chinese government did an excellent job censoring details of the pandemic and is exploiting it to strengthen its control over society.

Zhang contends that the display of Mao Zedong's preserved remains at Chairman Mao Memorial Hall is a moral and legal violation of Mao's expressed wish for a frugal socialist funeral.

== Book ==
- 君子之交如水 (in Chinese). Beijing: Writers Publishing House. 2007. p. 290. ISBN 9787506338585.
- 记忆：往事未付红尘 (in Chinese). Xi'an, Shaanxi: Shaanxi Normal University Press. 2004. p. 388. ISBN 9787561330586.
