= Chen Changzhi =

Chinese politician

- 陈昌智
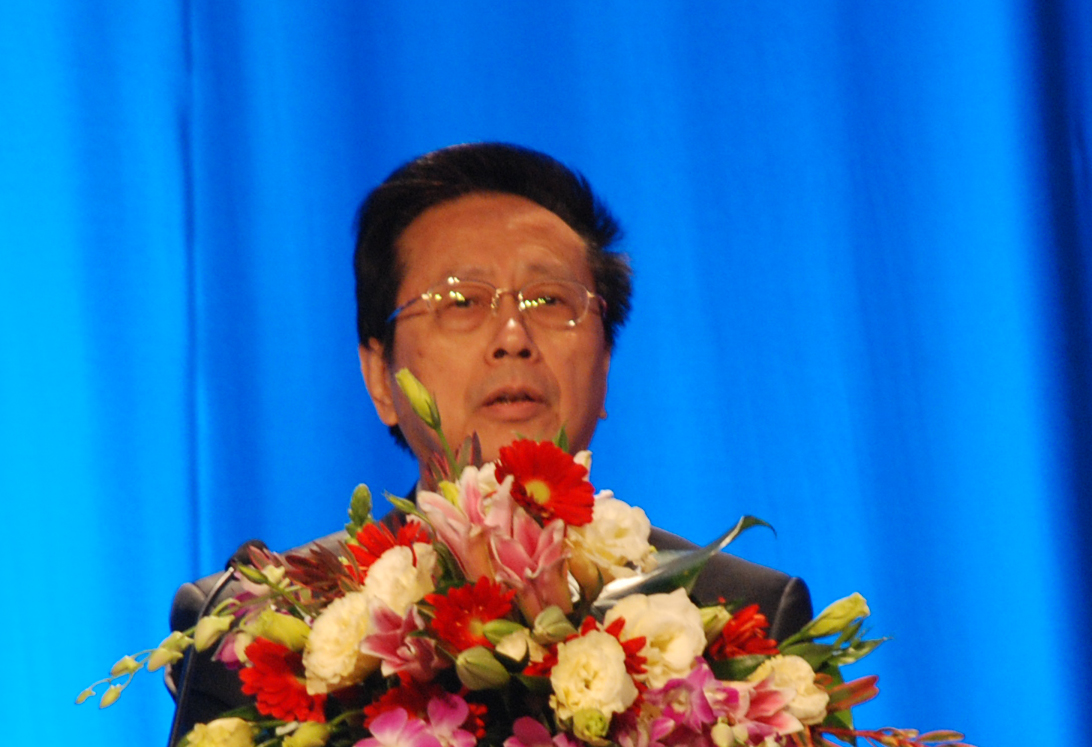

Vice Chairman of the Standing Committee of the National People's Congress
- In office 15 March 2008 – 17 March 2018
- Chairman: Wu Bangguo; Zhang Dejiang

Chairman of the China National Democratic Construction Association
- In office December 2007 – December 2017
- Preceded by: Cheng Siwei
- Succeeded by: Hao Mingjin

Personal details
- Born: July 1945 (age 81) Xiaogan, Hubei
- Party: China National Democratic Construction Association
- Education: Sichuan University

Chen Changzhi (Chinese: 陈昌智; born July 1945 in Hubei Province) is a Chinese politician who was the chairman of the China Democratic National Construction Association, a legally recognized non-Communist political party in China, and one of the vice chairmen of the Standing Committee of the National People's Congress of the People's Republic of China.
