= China National Democratic Construction Association =

Minor political party in China

China National Democratic Construction Association 中国民主建国会 Zhōngguó Mínzhǔ Jiànguó Huì
- Chairperson: Hao Mingjin
- Founded: 16 December 1945; 80 years ago
- Split from: China Democratic League
- Preceded by: Vocational Education Society; Qianchuan Factory Federation
- Headquarters: Beijing
- Newspaper: Economic Affairs; People's Information
- Membership (2024): 237,526
- Ideology: Socialism with Chinese characteristics
- National People's Congress (14th): 44 / 2,977
- NPC Standing Committee (14th): 4 / 175
- CPPCC National Committee (14th): 65 / 544 (Seats for political parties)

Website
- www.cndca.org.cn

China National Democratic Construction Association

Chinese name
- Traditional Chinese: 中國民主建國會
- Simplified Chinese: 中国民主建国会
Transcriptions
Standard Mandarin
- Hanyu Pinyin: Zhōngguó Mínzhǔ Jiànguó Huì

Abbreviation
- Chinese: 民建
Transcriptions
Standard Mandarin
- Hanyu Pinyin: Mínjiàn

Tibetan name
- Tibetan: ཀྲུང་གོ་དམངས་གཙོ་རྒྱལ་འཛུགས་ལྷན་ཚོགས
Transcriptions
- Wylie: krung go dmangs gtso rgyal 'dzugs lhan tshogs

Zhuang name
- Zhuang: Cunghgoz Minzcuj Gengoz Vei

Mongolian name
- Mongolian Cyrillic: Дундад улсын ардчилал улс байгуулах эвлэл
- Mongolian script: ᠳᠤᠮᠳᠠᠳᠤ ᠤᠯᠤᠰ ᠤᠨ ᠠᠷᠠᠳᠴᠢᠯᠠᠯ ᠤᠯᠤᠰ ᠪᠠᠶᠢᠭᠤᠯᠬᠤ ᠡᠪᠯᠡᠯ

Uyghur name
- Uyghur: جۇڭگو دېموكراتىك دۆلەت قۇرۇش جەمئىيىتى
Transcriptions
- Latin Yëziqi: Junggo démokratik dölet qurush jemiyiti
- Yengi Yeziⱪ: Junggo démokratik dölet qurush jemiyiti

Manchu name
- Manchu script: ᠮᡳᠨᠵᡳᠠᠨ
- Romanization: Minjian

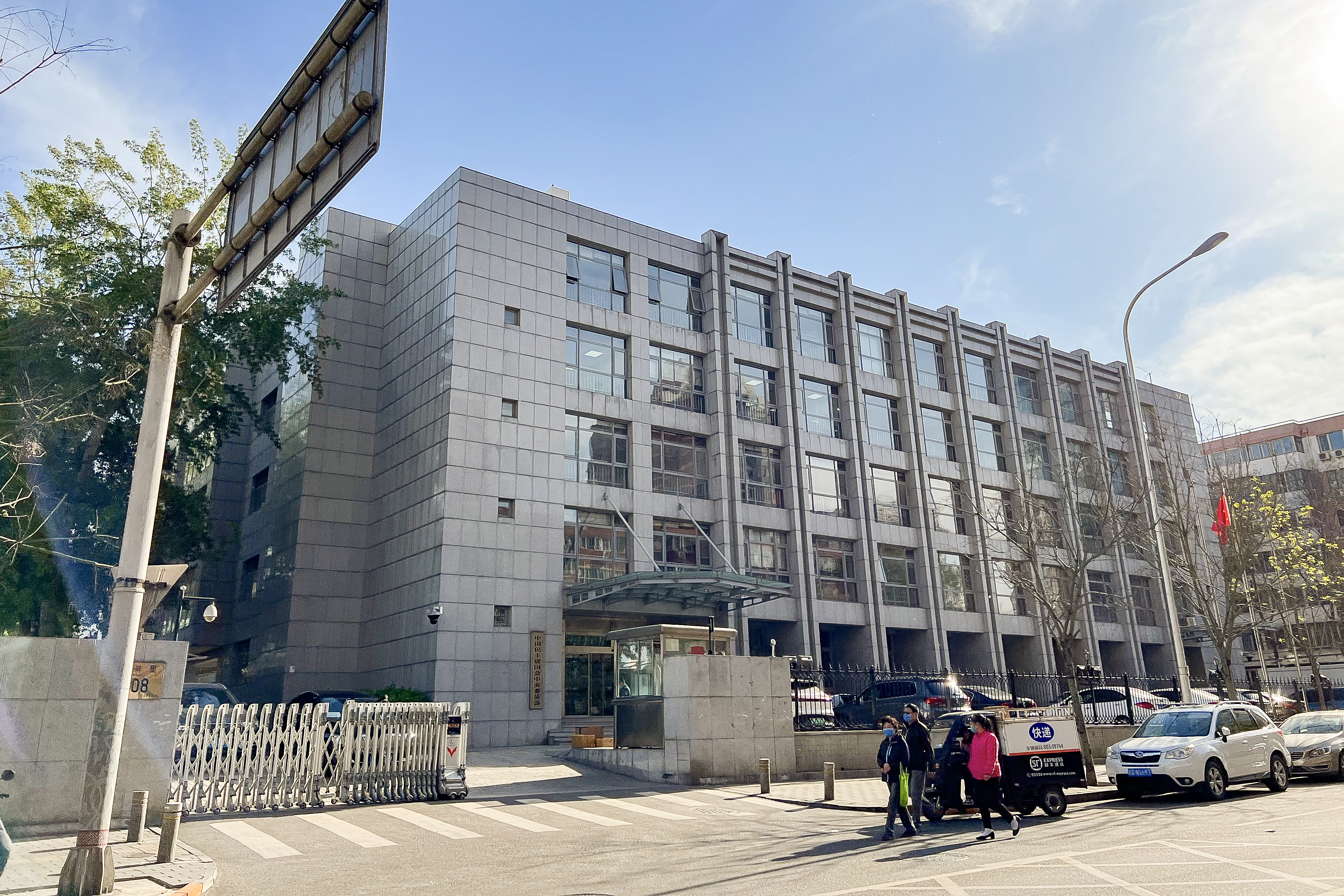
The headquarters of the Central Committee of the CNDCA

The China National Democratic Construction Association (CNDCA), (Note: sometimes translated as the China Democratic National Construction Association (CDNCA)) also known by its Chinese abbreviation Minjian (民建), is one of the eight minor non-oppositional political parties in the People's Republic of China, officially termed "democratic parties," led by the Chinese Communist Party.

The CNDCA was founded in Chongqing on 16 December 1945. The party's members are mainly entrepreneurs and others in the fields of economics. It is the third-ranking minor party in China. It currently has 44 seats in the National People's Congress, 4 seats in the NPC Standing Committee and 65 seats in the Chinese People's Political Consultative Conference. The current chairman of CNDCA is Hao Mingjin.

== History ==
After the end of the Second Sino-Japanese War, the Kuomintang and the Chinese Communist Party reached the Double Tenth Agreement. At that time, the China Vocational Education Association led by Huang Yanpei, the Sichuan-relocated Factories Federation (迁川工厂联合会) represented by Hu Juewen, together with a number of senior figures from the cultural and educational circles and from the national industrial and commercial community, began planning the establishment of a political organization to represent their shared interests. As a result, on 16 December 1945, the China Democratic National Construction Association was formally founded in the Southwest Industrial Building on Baixiang Street in Chongqing; the core of its basic political program was democracy and national development. The founding meeting elected Hu Juewen, Zhang Naiqi, Huang Yanpei, and others as members of the governing council.

In September 1949, representatives of the Association—including Huang Yanpei, Zhang Naiqi, Hu Juewen, Shi Fuliang, and Sun Qimeng—participated in the First Plenary Session of the Chinese People's Political Consultative Conference. Among them, Huang Yanpei was appointed one of the four Vice Premiers of the Government Administration Council.

In July 1952, it was renamed to the China National Democratic Construction Association. Its vice chairperson Rong Yiren served as the vice president of China from 1993 to 1998.

== Organization ==
According to its constitution, the CNDCA is officially committed to socialism with Chinese characteristics and upholding the leadership of the CCP. It is the third-ranking minor democratic party in the People's Republic of China. The chairman of the All-China Federation of Industry and Commerce has usually been a member of the CNDCA.

The highest body of the CNDCA officially is the National Congress, which is held every five years. The 12th National Congress, held in December 2022, was the most recently held Party Congress. The National Congress elects the Central Committee of the CNDCA. As of June 2024, has organizations in 30 province-level administrative divisions throughout China. It publishes the newspapers Economic Affairs (经济界) and People's Information (民讯).

=== Composition ===
Members of the party are chiefly entrepreneurs from the building, manufacturing, construction, financial, or commercial industries in both private and state sectors, and others in the field of economics. As of June 2024, the party has around 237,526 members, of whom 182,786 are from the economic sector, representing 77% of the total membership, 153,344 were from the business sector, representing 64.6% of the total membership, and 52,662 were from the private economy, representing 22.2% of the total membership.

=== Chairpersons ===
No.	Chairperson	Took office	Left office	Ref.
1	Huang Yanpei 黃炎培	16 December 1945	21 December 1965	
–	Li Zhuchen 李烛尘; Acting	21 December 1965	7 October 1968	
2	Hu Juewen 胡厥文	23 October 1979	December 1987	
3	Sun Qimeng 吴阶平	December 1987	December 1996	
4	Cheng Siwei 成思危	December 1996	December 2017	
5	Chen Changzhi 陈昌智	14 December 2007	20 December 2017	
6	Hao Mingjin 郝明金	20 December 2017	Incumbent	

== National People's Congress elections ==
Election year	Number of seats
2017–18	57 / 2,970
2022–23	44 / 2,977
