= Li Zhuchen =

Chinese politician

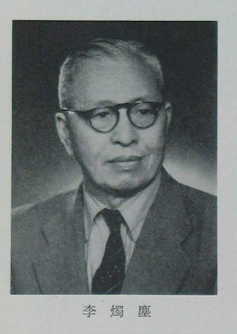
Li Zhuchen

Li Zhuchen (Chinese: 李烛尘; September 16, 1882 – October 7, 1968) was a Chinese male politician, who served as the vice chairperson of the Chinese People's Political Consultative Conference.
