= Hao Mingjin =

Chinese politician (born 1956)

- 郝明金
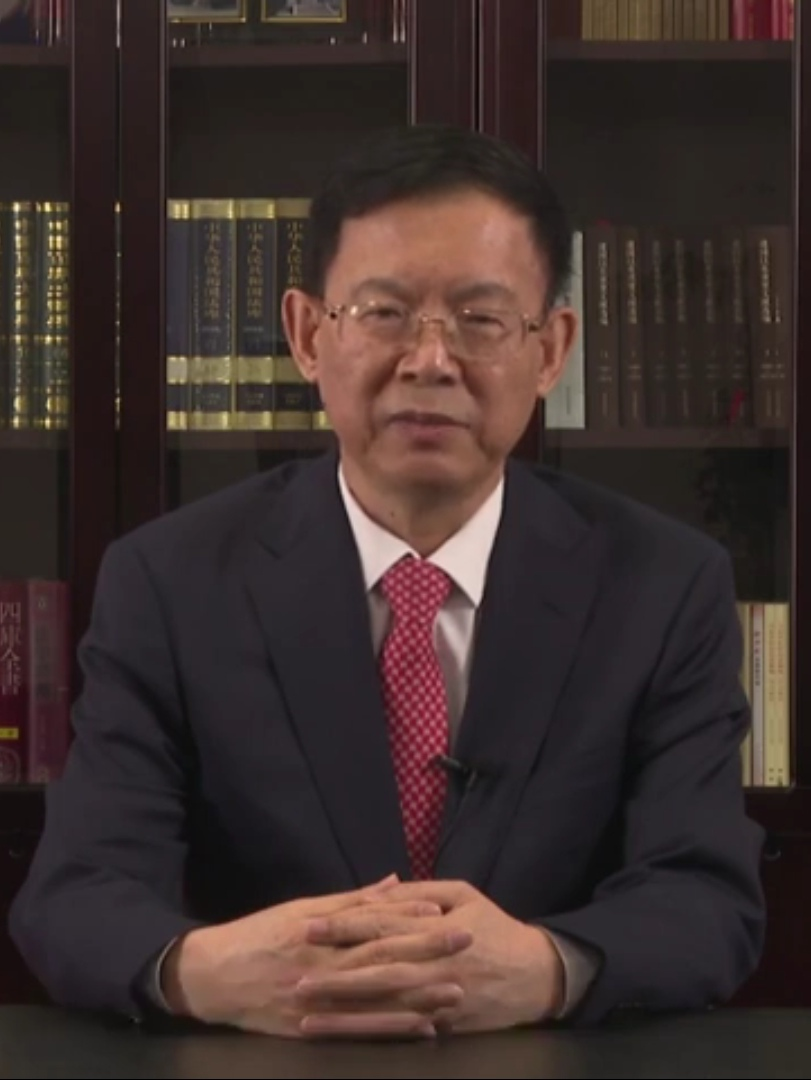

Vice Chairman of the Standing Committee of the National People's Congress
- Incumbent
- Assumed office 17 March 2018
- Chairman: Li Zhanshu; Zhao Leji

President of the Central Institute of Socialism
- Incumbent
- Assumed office August 2019
- Preceded by: Yan Junqi

Chairman of the China National Democratic Construction Association
- Incumbent
- Assumed office December 2017
- Preceded by: Chen Changzhi

Executive Vice Chairman of the China National Democratic Construction Association
- In office December 2016 – December 2017
- Chairman: Chen Changzhi
- Preceded by: Ma Peihua
- Succeeded by: Gu Shengzu

Vice Minister of Supervision
- In office January 2007 – January 2017
- Minister: Ma Wen; Huang Shuxian; Yang Xiaodu

Personal details
- Born: December 1956 (age 69) Jiaxiang County, Jining, Shandong Province
- Party: China National Democratic Construction Association
- Education: Shandong Normal University; Northeast Normal University; China University of Political Science and Law

Hao Mingjin (Chinese: 郝明金; pinyin: Hǎo Míngjīn; born December 1956), a native of Jiaxiang, Shandong, is a Chinese politician who is a vice chairman of the Standing Committee of the National People's Congress and chairman of the China National Democratic Construction Association.

== Biography ==
=== Shandong ===
Hao Mingjin began working in December 1971 as a newspaper clerk at the Heze District Post and Telegraph Bureau in Shandong Province. In February 1974, he took the same role at the Liangshan County Post and Telegraph Bureau before returning to the Heze District Post and Telegraph Bureau in December 1975. In October 1978, he pursued further studies in the Department of History at Shandong Normal University. By September 1982, he was enrolled in the Department of World History at Northeast Normal University, where he pursued a master's degree.

After earning his degree, he joined the Department of Law at Shandong University in July 1985 as a teacher. In September 1987, he was promoted to lecturer, and from January 1989 to June 1990, he attended Grambling State University in the United States for additional education. In January 1992, he was appointed assistant director while continuing as a lecturer. By December 1992, he had become an assistant professor and director of the associate degree program. In April 1993, he served as an assistant professor under the deputy director's leadership. Finally, in March 1994, he was promoted to associate professor and deputy dean of the Shandong University School of Law.

In December 1996, he assumed the role of Vice President of the Shandong Higher People's Court. From September 2001 to September 2004, he pursued doctoral studies at the Law School of China University of Political Science and Law, focussing on litigation law. In December 2003, he became a member of the China National Democratic Construction Association (CNDCA), and in February 2004, he was appointed a member of the Main Committee of the Shandong Provincial Committee of CNDCA. In May 2007, he was designated as Vice President of the Shandong Higher People's Court.

=== Ministry of Supervision ===
In December 2007, he was appointed Vice Minister of the Ministry of Supervision and became a member of the Standing Committee of the Central Committee of the CNDCA. In May 2008, he held the position of President of the China Supervisory Society. In December 2012, he assumed the roles of Vice Minister of the Ministry of Supervision, Vice Chairman of the Central Committee of the CNDCA, and President of the China Supervisory Society. In December 2016, he was designated as the Standing Vice Chairman of the Central Committee of the CNDCA.

In 2008, he was elected as a member of the 11th Chinese People's Political Consultative Conference (CPPCC). On 20 December 2017, he was elected as the chairman of the Central Committee of the China National Democratic Construction Association.

=== National People's Congress ===
On 17 March 2018, he was elected as a Vice Chairman of the Standing Committee of the 13th National People's Congress. In August 2019, he was appointed the President of the Central Institute of Socialism.

On 7 December 2020, Hao was sanctioned by the United States under Executive Order 13936 for his role in implementing the Hong Kong national security law.

On March 10, 2023, he was re-elected as vice-chairman of the Standing Committee of the National People's Congress (NPC) during the 14th NPC session. In January 2024, Hao headed a Chinese delegation to Kazakhstan and another to Turkmenistan to discuss collaboration between the countries. According to Chinese state media, he met with legislators and other leaders to discuss increasing bilateral ties, the 20th National Congress of the Chinese Communist Party, the Belt and Road Initiative and the one-China principle.
