= China Family Planning Association =

Organization in Beijing, China

- 中国计划生育协会
- Formation: May 29, 1980; 45 years ago
- Type: People's organization
- Purpose: Family planning
- President: Wang Gang
- Party Secretary: Yu Xuejun
- Website: www.chinafpa.org.cn

China Family Planning Association
- Simplified Chinese: 中国计划生育协会
- Traditional Chinese: 中國計劃生育協會
Transcriptions
Standard Mandarin
- Hanyu Pinyin: Zhōngguó Jìhuà Shēngyù Xiéhuì

The China Family Planning Association (CFPA) is a people's organization responsible for family planning in the People's Republic of China. It serves as a link between the Chinese Communist Party, the government and people of childbearing age and family planning families.

== History ==
The CFPA was founded on 29 May 1980 to help enforce the one-child policy.

== Functions ==
The CFPA is responsible for family planning. It officially serves as a "bridge and link between the Party and the government and the broad masses of people of childbearing age and family planning families".

== Organization ==
The CFPA is a member of the International Planned Parenthood Federation. It maintains branches in every province-level division of China.
