= Liu Qiao =

Liu Qiao may refer to:

- Liu Qiao (Jin dynasty) (劉喬; 249–311), military general of the Jin dynasty
- Liu Qiao (economist) (刘俏; born 1970)

== See also ==
- Liuqiao (disambiguation)
