= Gold Medal of the Hellenic Parliament =

The Gold Medal of the Hellenic Parliament is the highest distinction of the Hellenic Parliament. It is awarded by the President of the Hellenic Parliament. Pericles is depicted on the medal.

== Recipients ==
Year	Person	Position	References
2001	Vladimir Putin	President of Russia	
2002	Mary McAleese	President of Ireland	
2006	Somnath Chatterjee	Speaker of the Lok Sabha	
2006	Václav Klaus	President of the Czech Republic	
2007	A. P. J. Abdul Kalam	President of India	
2008	Ivan Gašparovič	President of Slovakia	
2008	Demetris Christofias	President of Cyprus	
2008	Archbishop Demetrios of America	Archbishop of America	
2009	Ilham Aliyev	President of Azerbaijan	
2009	Hans-Gert Pöttering	President of the European Parliament	
2010	Hovik Abrahamyan	President of the National Assembly of Armenia	
2010	Boris Tadić	President of Serbia	
2011	Serzh Sargsyan	President of Armenia	
2012	Shimon Peres	President of Israel	
2014	Li Keqiang	Premier of China	
2015	François Hollande	President of France	
2022	Milo Đukanović	President of Montenegro	
2022	Tiny Kox	President of the Parliamentary Assembly of the Council of Europe	
2022	Leonidas Kavakos	violinist, composer and conductor	
2022	Gianna Angelopoulos-Daskalaki	President of the "Greece 2021" National Committee	
2023	Nikos Christodoulides	President of Cyprus	
2024	Nikol Pashinyan	Prime Minister of Armenia	
2025	Igor Grosu	President of the Moldovan Parliament	
2026	Bartholomew I of Constantinople	Ecumenical Patriarch of Constantinople	
