= Guanghua School of Management =

Business school of Peking University

Guanghua School of Management, Peking University
- Type: Business school
- Established: 1985; 41 years ago
- Affiliations: Peking University
- Dean: Liu Qiao
- Faculty: 115
- Students: 3,723 (788 in Undergraduate ) (1187 in MBA) (1105 in EMBA) (312 in Master) (159 in Ph.D) (172 in MPAcc)
- Location: Beijing, China
- Website: www.gsm.pku.edu.cn

The Guanghua School of Management, Peking University (北京大学光华管理学院) is the business school of Peking University, a public university in Beijing, China.

The school offers undergraduate, master's, and doctoral programs, with a total enrollment of more than 3,000 students. In addition to full-time academic programs, the School runs an EMBA program and MPAcc program, as well as several other non-degree, customized Executive Education Programs. It has consistently been regarded as one of the top business schools in China, often recognized for faculty research, academic teaching, and admission selectivity. Notable members of the faculty include celebrated economists Li Yining and Zhang Weiying. The school's current dean is Liu Qiao.

The school is staffed with about 100 full-time teaching faculty members. Some universities represented by recently recruited faculty members are Harvard, Oxford, Yale, University of California, Berkeley, Stanford, Carnegie Mellon, Brown, and Purdue. The School offers Undergraduate, Specialized Master and Doctoral programs, with a total enrollment of more than 3,000 students. In addition to full-time academic programs, the School also runs an EMBA program and MPAcc program, as well as several other non-degree Executive Development Programs.

== History ==
In 1985 Peking University established the faculty of Economic Management and the Center of Scientific Management; in 1993 the faculty of Economic Management and the Center of Scientific Management merged to become Peking University's School of Business Administration. The school's name was changed in 1994 to honor the generous donation from the Guanghua Education Foundation in Hong Kong.

== Academics ==
The school comprises eight departments: Finance, Applied Economics, Marketing, Strategic Management, Accounting, Management Science and Information science, Business Statistics and Econometrics, It is regarded among academia as a leader among business schools in mainland China for research in the areas of finance, marketing, corporate strategy, financial accounting, human resources management, among others.

=== Degrees Offered ===
- Undergraduate
- MBA
- Executive MBA
- Master of Finance
- Master of Professional Accountancy (MPAcc)
- Doctor of Philosophy (Academic Postgraduate Program)
- Executive Education (ExEd)

=== Undergraduate degree program ===
As of September 12, 2012, the Guanghua School of Management has 848 full-time undergraduate students. The undergraduate business program at Guanghua is one of the most competitive in admissions nationwide, and each year the school recruits about 130 of the most promising high school seniors from across the country into its program. Admission to the Guanghua's undergraduate program is highly competitive, primarily on the basis of student performance on the National College Entrance Examination.

In 2012, the school began to employ an admissions system independent from the rest of the university as an effort to recruit the most talented scholars of economics and management from across the nation, regardless of urban or rural divide.

Undergraduate students complete their degree at Guanghua in four years. During the first two years of instruction, students enroll in intensive mathematics, English, and foundational disciplinary courses. At the end of the second year, students will select a major study area from three concentrations: Accounting, Finance, or Marketing. At the start of the third year, students will begin to take courses in their concentration area until their graduation theses are completed by the end of the fourth year.

Since 1997, Guanghua has provided undergraduate students with the ability to participate in international exchange programs along the principles of achieving economic globalization and internationalization in education. The school has signed student exchange agreements with a total of 96 universities in the United States, Canada, Europe, the Asia-Pacific region, Hong Kong, and Taiwan.

Undergraduate student research is heavily encouraged at Guanghua. The school has established a Dean's Fund, from which students may elect to apply for grants to conduct independent research under the guidance of a faculty member.

=== MBA program ===
The Guanghua School of Management offers a Full-time MBA program (taught in Chinese), an International MBA program (taught in English), and a Part-time MBA program (Taught in Chinese). Non-Chinese students can study in any of the programs, but the Full-time MBA and the Part-time MBA programs require a high level of Chinese language skills. The programs are two years long and incorporate both the case study method and corporate practice training into their teaching curriculum. The International MBA program places an emphasis on training non-Chinese students who wish to learn the realities of doing business in China.

MBA Specializations:

- Accounting and Financial Management
- Finance
- Decision and Information Management
- Marketing
- Human Resource Management
- International Business Strategy
- Innovation

Guanghua has extensive collaboration and exchange programs with leading international institutions such as the Kellogg Graduate School of Management of Northwestern University, the NYU Stern School of Business, INSEAD, the Schulich School of Business at York University, the Queen's School of Business at Queen's University, Warwick Business School, ESSEC, the Wharton School at the University of Pennsylvania, Seoul National University, the University of Mannheim, WHU – Otto Beisheim School of Management, the Zeppelin University, the Fuqua School of Management at Duke University, the McCombs School of Business at the University of Texas at Austin, the Foster School of Business at the University of Washington, Robert H. Smith School of Business at the University of Maryland and Stanford Business School. With the launching of an MBA program in Shenzhen and an international MBA program on the Beijing campus in 2000, Guanghua continues to expand its network worldwide.

=== Executive MBA ===
In 1999, Guanghua School of Management became the first mainland Chinese business school to offer an EMBA Program and has since expanded its program to Shanghai and Shenzhen. The program, designed for China's growing business elite, lasts two years, and students must complete all required coursework and pass their dissertation defense to receive their EMBA degree from Peking University.

The Executive MBA Program at Guanghua is a set of comprehensive and systematic courses in management designed for top-level executives. The most distinctive feature of the program is its integration between practical business management skills and advanced management theories. Guanghua's EMBA program has graduated over 4,000 alumni from various industries and maintains an active alumni network around the world through regular events, meetings, and industry associations.

=== Master of Finance ===
The Master of Finance program at Guanghua is one of the first of its kind in China, and aims to cultivate professionals with a solid foundation in financial theory. Within the program, students devote their training towards solving theoretical and practical issues in finance, economics, management science, and econometric analysis. In 2012, the Master of Finance program was ranked 8th in the world by the Financial Times.

=== Master of Professional Accountancy (MPAcc) ===
The Master of Professional Accountancy (MPAcc) program at the Guanghua School of Management is a part-time degree program, intended for working professionals who are college graduates with at least two years' experience in the accounting profession. Classes are held on weekday evenings and weekends, and are designed to equip students with financial expertise so that they are able to assume leading management roles in professional accounting organizations.

=== Academic postgraduate program ===
The academic postgraduate program at Guanghua is designed for students who wish to pursue masters or doctorate degrees and intend to become scholars who can conduct high-quality scientific research in mainstream research areas relating to management and economics.

The doctoral program covers seven specialties: national economy, industrial economy, finance, statistics, entrepreneurial management, management science and engineering, and accounting, among which entrepreneurial management consists of 3 directions—organizational behavior and human resources management, marketing, and strategic management.

=== Executive Education ===
The Executive Education Center at Guanghua offers a wide variety of short and long-term executive education programs for professionals and executives in senior management positions. The Center annually provides more than 100 open enrollment programs and customized programs designed to train students with skills to respond to the competitive business environment for senior corporate managers and their organizations.

Guanghua has its own residency facilities for executive development programs on campus. The new executive education center features 4 amphitheatre style classrooms, each with the capacity of 78 students; 3 regular classrooms, each with the capacity of 40 students; 3 classrooms with the capacity of 30, 12 breakout discussion rooms and an auditorium with a capacity of 300. The facilities also feature a residency complex of 82 elegant business guest rooms, dining areas, lounges, a fitness center, a pub, and a business center. The entire executive education center is equipped with state-of-the art technology for teaching, wireless communication and audio- visual conferencing.

== Departments and Program ==
Guanghua offers three academic degrees: bachelor's degree, master's degree and a doctorate degree. For its bachelor's degree, Guanghua offers 3 specializations, Finance, Accounting and Marketing. Its master's program offers 8 specializations: Finance, Industrial Economics, Enterprise Management, Accounting, Statistics, Management Science and Engineering. In the doctorate program, Guanghua has 4 specializations: National Economics, Finance, Industrial Economics and Enterprise Management. The National Economics specialization has been highly emphasized by the state as one of its "national key disciplines".

== Affiliated Research Centers ==
GSM researches actively in its disciplines, but is regarded widely as a leader among business schools in mainland China for research in the areas of finance, marketing, corporate strategy, financial accounting, and human resources management. Facilities that research under GSM include:

- Peking University's Center of Management Science
- Peking University Finance and Bond Research Center
- Peking University International Accounting and Financial Affairs Research Center
- Peking University Financial Mathematics and Financial Engineering Research Center
- Peking University Network Economy Research Center
- Peking University Business Administration Research Center
- Peking University International Operation Management Research Center
- Peking University Center of Chinese Medium-Small Enterprise Development
- Peking University Research Center of Investment in the 21st Century
- Peking University Enterprise Management Case Study Research Center
- Peking University Research Center of Economic Analysis and Forecast
- Peking University Complex Scientific Modeling Research Center
- Peking University China and WTO Research Center
- Peking University Guanghua School of Management Chinese Enterprise Management Research Center
- Peking University Guanghua School of Management International Finance Research Center
- Peking University Sociological Economic System Analysis and Modeling Laboratories
- Peking University National High Technology Estate Development Strategy Research Center

== Rankings and Reputation ==
Guanghua was ranked #54 in the top 100 Global MBA rankings by the Financial Times for its International MBA program, and #8 for its Master of Finance program in 2012. It has consistently been regarded as one of the top business schools in China, often recognized for faculty research, academic teaching, and admission selectivity.

Guanghua won first place as the most Influential MBA of China in a ranking conducted by the World Executive. In the 2009 QS Global 200 Business Schools Report the school was ranked 19th in the Asia Pacific region.

In 2020, Guanghua School was ranked 19th globally in the Times Higher Education Rankings by Subjects for "Economics and Business" subjects. It was ranked 23rd, 25th and 36th in the QS World University Rankings by Subjects for "Accounting and Finance", "Economics and Econometrics" and "Business and Management" subjects respectively, which are historical strengths for the school.

== Notable Administrators and Faculties ==
=== Li Yining ===
Professor Li Yining was the first dean of GSM. Li is a highly regarded economist who has been involved in economic reforms in China. He is credited as developing an imbalanced economy theory that used research on economic practices between China and other countries. Li later proposed an idea to reform the Chinese economy with a joint-stock system – this plan was later widely accepted in the country. As a result of his accomplishments, Li has received several honors for his work. He is the winner of the Sun Yefang Economics Award and the Golden Triangle Award. In addition, he was given the International Cooperation Award of Environment and Development, one of the highest honors in the Chinese economic world. In 1998, he was awarded an honorary social science doctorate degree by Hong Kong Polytechnic University. In April 2005, Professor Li Yining was awarded honorary dean by Peking University's vice principal and Party vice Party secretary, Professor Wu Zhipan.

=== Zhang Weiying ===
Professor Weiying Zhang graduated with a bachelor's degree in 1982, and a master's degree in 1984, from Northwestern University at Xi'an. He received his M.Phil. in economics in 1992 and D.Phil. in economics from Oxford University. His D.Phil. supervisors were James Mirrlees (1996 Nobel Laureate) and Donald Hay. Between 1984 and 1990, he was a research fellow of the Economic System Reform Institute of China under the State Commission of Restructuring Economic System. During this period, he was heavily involved in economic reform policy making in China. He was the first Chinese economist who proposed the "dual-track price system reform" (in 1984). He was also known for his contributions to macro-control policy debating, ownership reform debating, and entrepreneurship studies. After he graduated from Oxford, he co-founded China Center for Economic Research (CCER), Peking University in 1994, and worked with the Center first as an associate professor and then as a professor until August 1997. He then moved to Guanghua School of Management in September 1997.

=== Cai Hongbin ===
Cai Hongbin was the third dean of the Guanghua School of Management. From 1997 to 2005 he was an assistant economics professor at the University of California Los Angeles. Cai Hongbin has a bachelor's degree in mathematics from Wuhan University, a master's degree in economics from Peking University, and a PhD in economics from Stanford University. He is director of J. Mirrlees Institute of Economic Policy Research (IEPR) at Peking University, and director of Guanghua Center of Innovation and Entrepreneurship. He is a National Chang Jiang Scholar (awarded by the Ministry of Education of China) and a National Outstanding Young Researcher (awarded by National Science Foundation of China). He is a member of the Central Committee of China Democratic League and Vice Chairman of its Committee of Economic Affairs. He was the founding president of The Chinese Finance Association (TCFA, overseas). He serves on the boards of China Unicom and China Everbright Bank.
