= Liuqiao =

Liuqiao may refer to these places in China:

- Liuqiao Subdistrict, Xiangshan District, Huaibei, Anhui
- Liuqiao, Suixi County, town in Suixi County, Anhui
- Liuqiao, Guangxi, town in Fusui County, Guangxi

== See also ==
- Liu Qiao (disambiguation)
