= Li Keqiang =

Premier of China from 2013 to 2023

- 李克强
- Li in 2019

Premier of China
- In office 15 March 2013 – 11 March 2023
- President: Xi Jinping
- Vice Premier: Cabinet I (2013–2018): Zhang Gaoli; Liu Yandong; Wang Yang; Ma Kai; Cabinet II (2018–2023): Han Zheng; Sun Chunlan; Hu Chunhua; Liu He
- Preceded by: Wen Jiabao
- Succeeded by: Li Qiang

Vice Premier of China
- In office 17 March 2008 – 15 March 2013
- Premier: Wen Jiabao

Party Secretary of Liaoning
- In office 13 December 2004 – 29 October 2007
- Governor: Zhang Wenyue
- Preceded by: Wen Shizhen
- Succeeded by: Zhang Wenyue

Party Secretary of Henan
- In office 30 December 2002 – 13 December 2004
- Governor: Li Chengyu
- Preceded by: Chen Kuiyuan
- Succeeded by: Xu Guangchun

First Secretary of the Communist Youth League of China
- In office 10 May 1993 – 23 June 1998
- Preceded by: Song Defu
- Succeeded by: Zhou Qiang

Personal details
- Born: 3 July 1955 Hefei, Anhui, China
- Died: 27 October 2023 (aged 68) Shanghai, China
- Party: CCP (from 1974)
- Spouse: Cheng Hong (m. 1983)
- Children: 1
- Education: Peking University (LLB, MEc, PhD)
- Cabinet: 12th State Council; 13th State Council
- Scientific career
- Fields: Economics
- Thesis: On the ternary structure of Chinese economy (1991)
- Doctoral advisor: Li Yining (厉以宁)
- Li Keqiang's voice Li at the press conference during the National People's Congress discussing China–U.S. relations Recorded on 11 March 2021
- Central institution membership: 2007–2022: 17th, 18th, 19th Politburo Standing Committee; 2007–2022: 17th, 18th, 19th Politburo; 1997–2022: Full member, 15th, 16th, 17th, 18th, 19th Central Committee; 1993–1998: Delegate, 8th National People's Congress; Leading group posts: 2020–2022: Leader, leading group on the prevention and control of the novel Coronavirus pandemic; 2014–2023: Deputy Leader, Leading Group for Internet Security and Informatization; 2013–2023: Deputy Leader, Leading Group for Financial and Economic Affairs; 2013–2022: Deputy Leader, Central Leading Group for Comprehensively Deepening Reforms; 2013–2023: Leader, Leading Group for Climate Change and Emissions Reduction; 2013–2023: Leader, Leading Party Members Group of the State Council; 2008–2013: Leader, Leading Group for Health Care Reform; 2008–2013: Leader, Leading Group for Coordinating the South-North Water Transfer Project; 2008–2013: Leader, Leading Group for Coordinating the Three Gorges Dam Project; Other offices held: 2013–2023: Vice Chairman, National Security Commission; 2013–2023: Chairman, State Commission for Public Sector Reform; 2013–2023: Chairman, National Defense Mobilization Commission; 2013–2023: Chairman, National Energy Commission; 2013–2023: Chairman, Central Institutional Organization Commission; 2005–2007: Chairman, Liaoning Provincial People's Congress; 2003–2004: Chairman, Henan Provincial People's Congress; 1999–2003: Governor of Henan; 1998–2003: Director of the Yellow River Flood Response Headquarters; 1993–1998: Principal of the Chinese Youth Political Academy; 1982–1983: Communist Youth League Secretary, Peking University

Chinese name
- Simplified Chinese: 李克强
- Traditional Chinese: 李克強
Transcriptions
Standard Mandarin
- Hanyu Pinyin: Lǐ Kèqiáng
- Gwoyeu Romatzyh: Lii Kehchyang
- Wade–Giles: Li K'o-ch'iang
- IPA: [lì kʰɤ̂.tɕʰjǎŋ]
Yue: Cantonese
- Yale Romanization: Léih Hāk-kèuhng
- IPA: [lej˩˧ hɐk̚˥.kʰœŋ˩]

Li Keqiang (Chinese: 李克强; pinyin: Lǐ Kèqiáng; 3 July 1955 – 27 October 2023) was a Chinese politician and economist who served as premier of China from 2013 to 2023 and was the second-ranking member of the Chinese Communist Party (CCP)'s Politburo Standing Committee from 2012 to 2022.

Born in Hefei, Anhui province, Li rose through the ranks in the Communist Youth League of China, serving as its first secretary from 1993 to 1998. From 1998 to 2004, he served in Henan, including as governor and later as party secretary of the province. From 2004 to 2007 he served as the party secretary of Liaoning. From 2008 to 2013, Li served as the first-ranked vice premier (Note: Li's title has been variously translated as "Executive Vice Premier" or "First Vice-Premier", though the practice of making explicit reference to the Vice Premier's rank has gradually been phased out since Deng Xiaoping last assumed the title of "First Vice Premier" during the Cultural Revolution. In state media, Li was almost always been referred to as simply the "Vice Premier".) overseeing economy, under then-premier Wen Jiabao.

Initially seen as a candidate for the paramount leader, Li instead assumed the post of premier in 2013. During his tenure, he promoted a shift in China's economic priorities from export-led growth toward domestic consumption. He played a key role in the establishment of the Shanghai Free-Trade Zone in 2013 and championed the policy of mass entrepreneurship and innovation. Under his premiership, the State Council launched the Made in China 2025 strategic initiative in 2015. Li also oversaw China's response to the COVID-19 pandemic.

Owing to his experience in the Communist Youth League, Li was viewed as an ally of Hu Jintao and associated with the Tuanpai faction. With a scholarly background, he was often characterized as reform-minded and pragmatic, representing the technocratic wing of China's leadership. However, both he and the premiership itself were seen as increasingly hollowed out amid the so-called "dispute between the north and south houses" at Zhongnanhai, as the party–government co-governance of the previous leadership broke down under Xi Jinping. Li stepped down from the Politburo Standing Committee in October 2022 and was succeeded as premier by Li Qiang in March 2023. He died in October 2023 from a heart attack, several months after leaving office.

== Early life and education ==
Li was born on 3 July 1955 in Dingyuan County of Hefei, Anhui province. His father was a local official in Anhui. Li graduated from Hefei No. 8 Senior High School in 1974, during the Cultural Revolution, and was sent for rural labour in an agriculture commune in Fengyang County, Anhui. There, he joined the Chinese Communist Party (CCP) in 1976 and became the party head of the local production team. He was awarded the honor of Outstanding Individual in the Study of Mao Zedong Thought during this time.

Li refused his father's offer of grooming him for the local county's party leadership and entered Peking University Law School in 1978, where he became the president of the university's student council. He studied under Professor Gong Xiangrui, a well-known British-educated expert on Western political systems. Together with his classmates, he translated important legal works from English to Chinese, including Lord Denning's book The Due Process of Law. He received a Bachelor of Laws degree in 1982.

In 1982, Li became the Communist Youth League of China (CYLC) Committee Secretary at Peking University. He passed of a chance to study in the United States to stay as the Committee Secretary. He entered the top leadership of the national CYLC in 1983 as an alternate member of CYLC Central Committee's Secretariat, and worked closely with future Party General Secretary Hu Jintao, who also rose through the ranks of the CYLC. He was appointed as a secretary of the CYLC Secretariat in 1985.

In 1988, he returned to Peking University for graduate studies. He studied economics under prominent economist Li Yining, who was his doctoral advisor. He received a Master of Economics and a Doctor of Philosophy in Economics from Peking University in 1995. At the invitation of Li Yining, Li Keqiang's doctoral dissertation review committee was composed of well-known Chinese economists and researchers. Because of the high academic rigor of the committee, Li postponed the defense of his dissertation by six months. Described as being able to "withstand any kind of inspection" by his doctoral advisor, Li's doctoral dissertation, "On the ternary structure of Chinese economy", published in 1991, was awarded the Sun Yefang Prize, China's highest prize in economics, in 1996.

Li became the CYLC's first secretary in 1993 and served in that role until 1998. In 1993, Li proposed the CYLC's Youth Volunteers Operation, which recruits and channels volunteers into educational, social, and environmental projects. It is regarded as an important achievement of his tenure as CYLC first secretary. Li was a representative member of the first generation to have risen from the CYLC leadership. In 1997, he became a full member of the CCP Central Committee.

== Provincial tenures ==
=== Henan (1998–2004) ===
Li became the youngest Chinese provincial governor in June 1998 when he was appointed governor of Henan at the age of 43. He also became Henan's Deputy Party Secretary. According to provincial officials working with him at the time, Li refused to participate in any banquets or large fancy events not related to government activities. During his time as governor, a public sense of his "bad luck" grew due to the occurrence of three major fires in the province.

Li was known to be outspoken and led economic development in Henan, transforming the poor inland region into an attractive area for investment. He trekked through all regions of the province trying to search for a comprehensive solution to its growing problems. In December 2002, the Central Committee of the Chinese Communist Party decided to appoint Li to replace Chen Kuiyuan as the Secretary of the Henan Provincial Party Committee, and left his post as governor in 2003. Henan jumped in national GDP rankings from 28th in the early 1990s to 18th in 2004, when Li left Henan. However, his government was relatively ineffective at curbing the HIV/AIDS epidemic that was affecting the rural areas of the province.

=== Liaoning (2004–2007) ===
Li was transferred to work as the Party secretary of Liaoning in December 2004. There he was known for the "Five Points and One Line" project, where he linked Dalian, Dandong, and a series of other ports into a comprehensive network to improve trade flow. In January 2005, Li set a goal of tackling the slums in the province within three years, a project which he coordinated with the central government. The campaign led to the removal of more than 12 million square metres of slums in the province by 2007 and gained him popular support. During his leadership in Liaoning, Li designed the "Li Keqiang index", an unconventional economic indicator that aimed to bypass the often unreliable official provincial GDP numbers, which were often artificially inflated, and thus serve as a better indicator of economic health. Instead of gathering data on total economic output alone, he used railway cargo volume, electricity consumption, and total loans disbursed by banks to determine the health of the economy.

== Vice premiership (2008–2013) ==
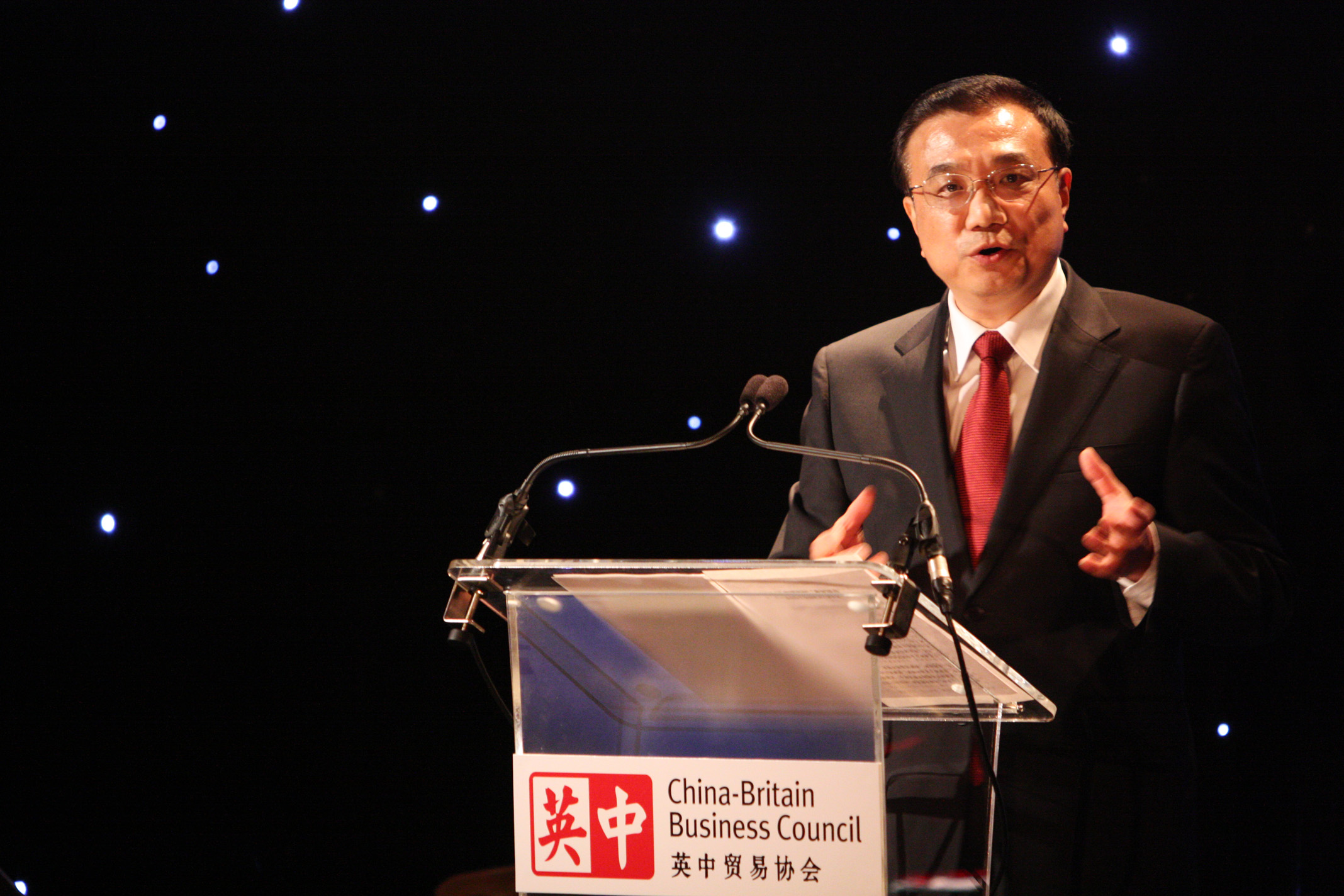
Li attends the China–Britain Business Council dinner and delivers a speech, January 2011.

Li joined the CCP Politburo Standing Committee after the 17th Party Congress held in October 2007 as its 7th-ranking member. He was succeeded in his Liaoning party secretary post by governor Zhang Wenyue. Given his Youth League experience and his association with then paramount leader Hu Jintao, Li was viewed from early on in Hu's term as a contender to succeed Hu when his term as party leader ended in 2012. While Li's political future seemed promising, he was outranked on the Standing Committee by Xi Jinping, who had just left his role as party secretary of Shanghai to join the central leadership ranks in Beijing. This rank order signaled that it would be Xi, not Li, who would eventually succeed Hu as party general secretary and president. In November 2007, Li met with European Commission President José Manuel Barroso, his first meeting with a foreign delegation in his new capacity.

At the 1st Session of the 11th National People's Congress, Li was elected as the first-ranking vice premier, reinforcing the speculation that Li would become premier and was being groomed to succeed Premier Wen Jiabao. Li's portfolio as vice premier included economic development, government budgets, land and resources, the environment, and health. He also became the head of central commissions overseeing the Three Gorges Dam and the South–North Water Transfer Project, as well as the leader of steering committees in charge of health care reform, food safety, and AIDS-related work. In addition, Li was the principal lieutenant to premier Wen Jiabao in the broad portfolios of climate change, energy, information technology, northeastern China revitalization, and developing the Chinese far west. He was also put in charge of restructuring the government.

In March 2008, Li gave his first public speech as vice premier. As vice premier, he was instrumental in pushing through an economic stimulus program in 2008, which was intended to help the economy to rebound from the Sichuan earthquake as well as the Great Recession. He appeared at the 2010 World Economic Forum in Davos, Switzerland, where he presented China's long-term vision for development in front of world business and political leaders. In particular, he briefed the WEF on China's commitment to sustainable development, green energy, decreasing the income gap and modernizing key strategic industries. While reiterating China's commitment to peaceful development and its focus in increasing domestic demand despite the external pressures of the 2008 financial crisis, Li also warned against protectionism, saying "opening up can be both bilateral and multilateral... in this sense, one plus one is more often than not bigger than two."

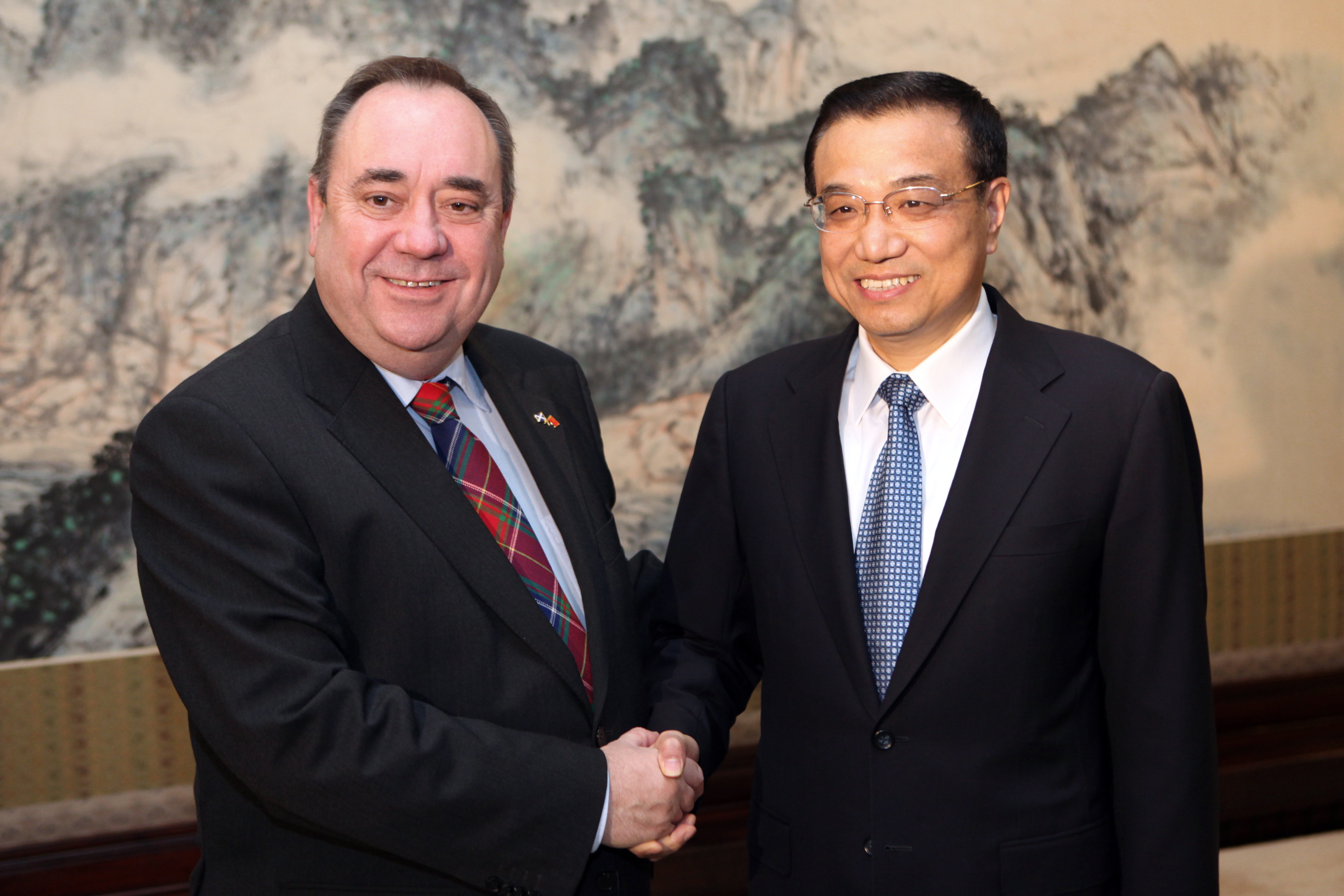
Keqiang with First Minister of Scotland, Alex Salmond, December 2011

In February 2010, Li gave a speech to ministerial and provincial-level leaders about the importance of changing the economic structure of the country in order to be better poised for future growth. The speech was published with minor omissions in the 1 June issue of Qiushi, the Communist Party's political theory publication. Li said that China had come to a critical historical inflection point where a fundamental shift in the structure of the economy must take place in order for the country to continue its path of growth. Li particularly emphasized the need to boost domestic consumption, and emphasized the importance of continued urbanization. Li also emphasized that China should be moving towards a more middle class-oriented society with an "olive"-shaped wealth distribution, with the majority of the country's population and wealth belonging to the middle class. He also reiterated the importance of industrialization, urbanization and agricultural modernization in China in order to improve its competitiveness, food security, energy security, affordable housing, and healthcare.

In August 2011, Li went on an official visit to Hong Kong, including a trip to the University of Hong Kong. The political sensitivities and heightened security surrounding the event resulted in the Hong Kong 818 incident, an event that caused controversy in the territory. In late 2011, at the national environmental protection working conference, Li called on China to have a "blue sky, clear water and uncontaminated soil". In November 2011, while visiting Hebei, Li said that policies introduced by the government to curb housing prices would be maintained and urged local governments to build affordable homes for low-income residents. In April 2012, at the opening ceremony of the Boao Forum for Asia, Li expressed confidence over China's economy, and said China would continue to stabilize economic growth while curbing inflation. In October 2012, Li said the government would replace business tax with a value-added tax for more companies, including those in postal, telecommunications, railways and construction, with the eventual aim to cover all of China. In November 2012, after it was revealed a hospital rejected a lung cancer patient after finding out he was infected with HIV, Li demanded health authorities to "ensure the rights" of HIV patients to "medical care without any discrimination".

== Premiership (2013–2023) ==
Li was elected as the second-ranking member of the Politburo Standing Committee by the first plenary session of the 18th Central Committee on 15 November 2012, held immediately after the 18th CCP National Congress in the November 2012. As he was expected to become premier, this was a shift from previous convention on the PSC set in 1997 whereby the premier ranked third, after the chairman of the Standing Committee of the National People's Congress, who ranked second. At a panel meeting of the Congress, Li emphasized that China must pursue "four new modernizations", referring to industrialization, information technology application, urbanization, and agricultural modernization. In November 2012, shortly after the Party Congress, Li spoke at a seminar organized by the State Council, where he emphasized reform to achieve a moderately prosperous society by 2020.

Li later met with HIV/AIDS activists 12 non-governmental organizations at the Ministry of Health. In December 2012, Li visited Jiangxi, his first inspection trip since becoming the second-ranking PSC member. On 15 March 2013, the first session of the 12th National People's Congress (NPC), Li was nominated by newly elected President Xi Jinping to be the premier. He was subsequently appointed as premier by the NPC, succeeding Wen Jiabao. Of the nearly 3,000 legislators assembled at the Congress, 2,940 voted for him, three against, and six abstained. On 16 March, the NPC appointed Zhang Gaoli, Liu Yandong, Wang Yang, and Ma Kai as vice premiers following their nominations by Li. He gave his first major speech 17 March at the conclusion of the NPC, calling for frugality in government, a fairer distribution of income and continued economic reform. Li focused his attention on China to move towards a consumption based economy instead of relying on export led growth.

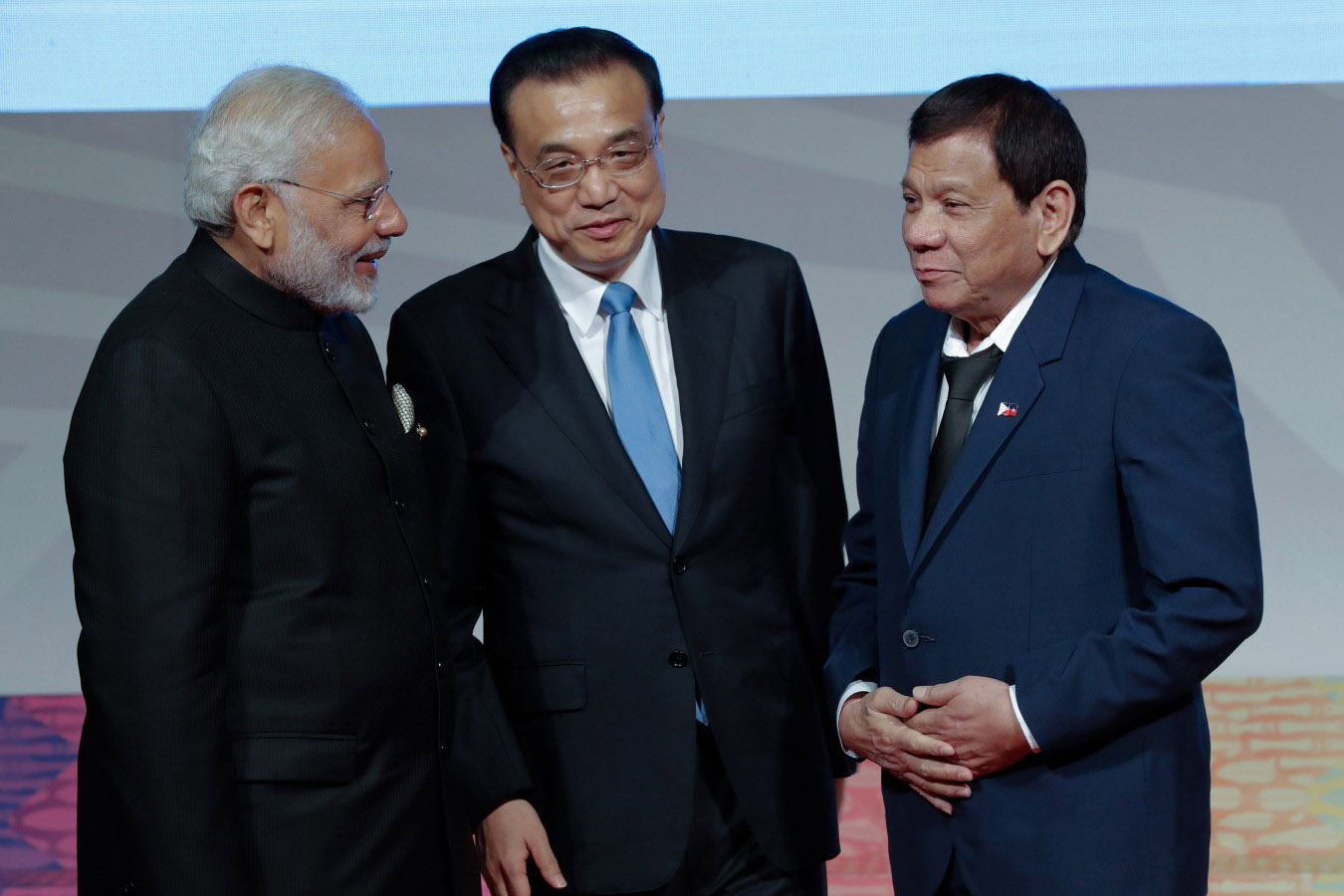
Li with Indian Prime Minister Narendra Modi and Philippine President Rodrigo Duterte

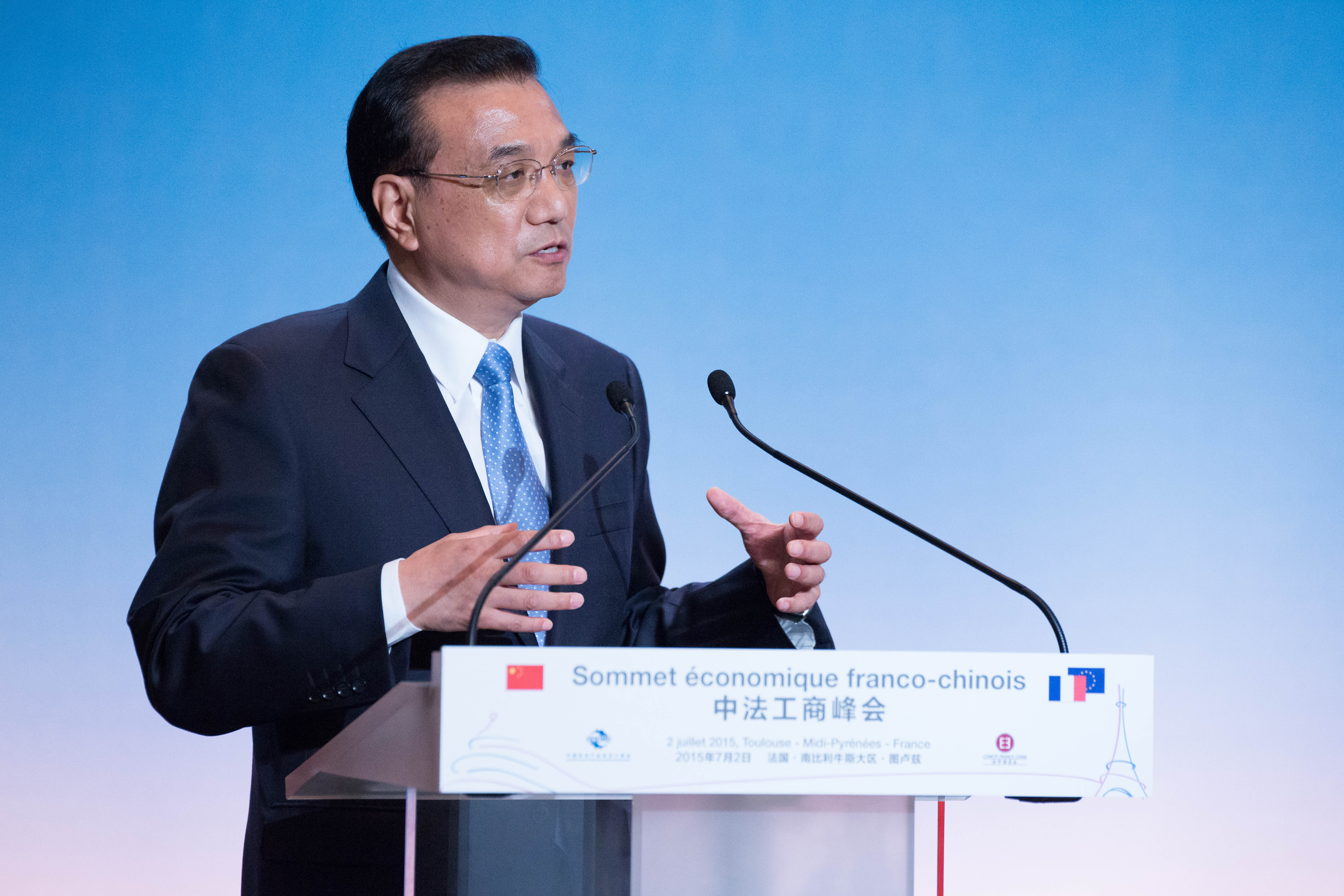
July 2015, Li attends the Franco-Chinese economic summit and delivers a speech.

On 18 March 2018, Li was reappointed premier after being nominated by President Xi Jinping and receiving 2,964 votes in favour and just two against by the NPC. There has been speculation that Li may have been sidelined by Xi Jinping's consolidation of power, with some calling him the "weakest premier" since the CCP took power in 1949. This has been seen as a "dispute between north and south houses", referring to the State Council (located in the north of Zhongnanhai) and the Party center (located in the Zhonanghai's south).

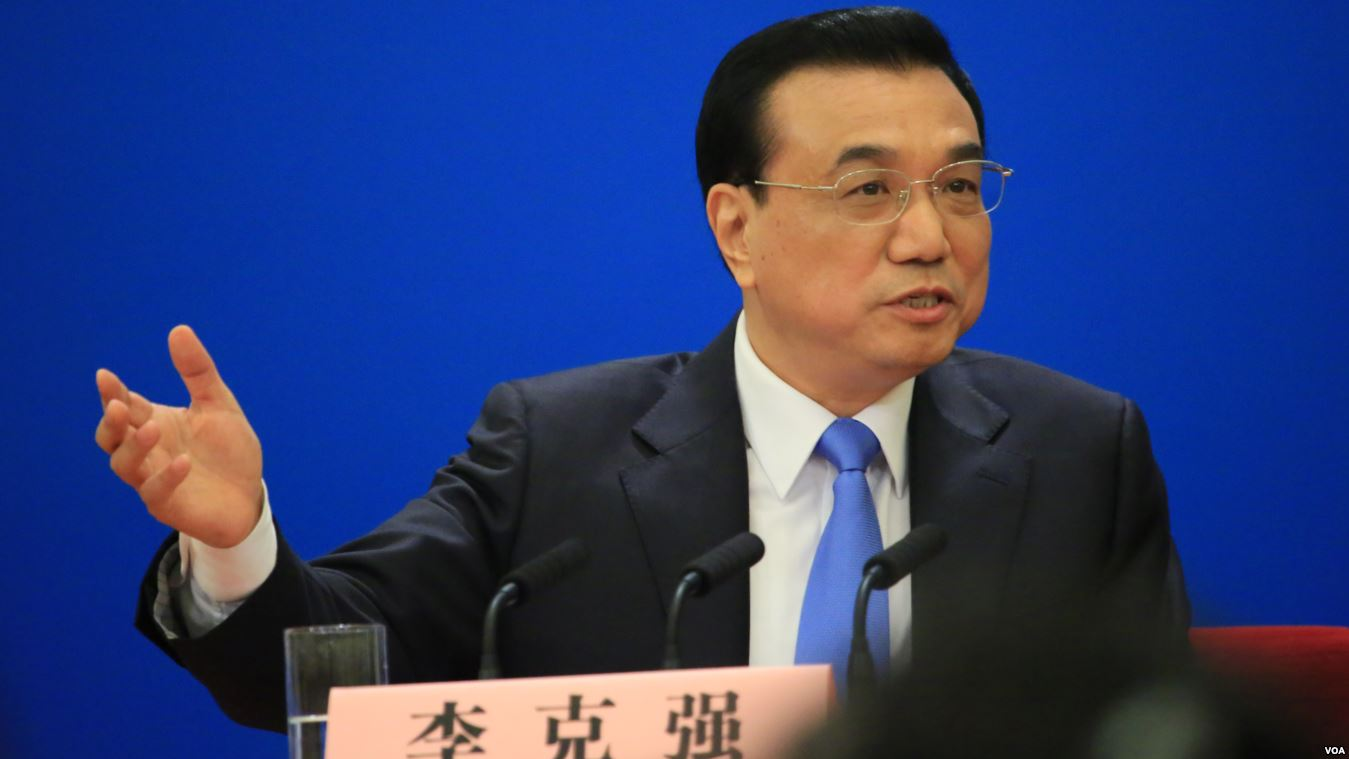
March 2015, Li attends the Chinese and foreign press conference.

=== Domestic policy ===
In March 2013, Li held his first State Council meeting as premier, where he called on officials to implement government directives. He also announced curbs on off-budget spending to fight corruption. In April 2013, Li said China would continue to increase investment at a "reasonable" pace. In the same month, Li visited Sichuan after the Lushan earthquake, emphasizing the need for quick action. He later also called on officials to decrease the fatality rate of the H7N9 bird flu. In June 2013, Li held the first meeting of the "Global CEO Advisory Council" which included the heads of 14 business leaders. In the same month, Li signaled China's financial system should curb credit expansion. In July 2013, Li was named the head of the Leading Group for Western Region Development of the State Council, the Leading Group for the Revitalization of Old Industrial Bases in Northeast China of the State Council, and the Leading Group for the National Response to Climate Change and Energy Conservation. In August 2013, Li ordered the National Audit Office to audit the debt held by local governments. In September 2013, Li attended a meeting of the World Economic Forum in Dalian, where he said China would pursue financial reform including interest rate and exchange rate liberalization, promoting the yuan's convertibility under the capital account, and easing barriers for newer and smaller actors to enter the financial industry.

Li was critical in the opening of the Shanghai Free-Trade Zone, which opened in September 2013, and fought opposition from the China Banking Regulatory Commission and the China Securities Regulatory Commission. South China Morning Post reported in October 2013 that Li preferred to keep a low-profile to not endanger his reform agenda. In November 2013, Li said China needed an economic growth rate of 7.2 percent to keep employment stable. At the third plenum of the 18th Central Committee held in the fall of 2013, the CCP announced far-reaching economic and social reforms. However, the document outlining the reforms was drafted under the leadership of Xi, Liu Yunshan and Zhang Gaoli, and Li was ostensibly not involved in preparing the document. This departure from convention (Wen was the principal drafter of documents behind the reforms announced at the Third Plenum of 2003) led to speculation that Li was becoming marginalized in the new administration, and that the widely touted "Xi–Li Administration" in fact did not exist, as power was increasingly being centralized under the hands of Xi as the general secretary of the Chinese Communist Party.

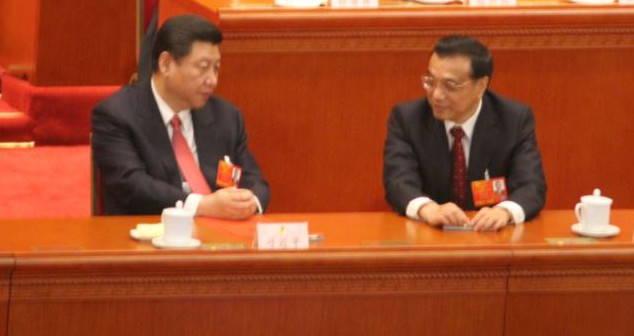
Xi Jinping (left) and Li Keqiang (right)

Following the third plenum of 2013, Xi amassed a series of leadership roles on four new powerful supra-ministerial bodies overseeing "comprehensively deepening reforms", the internet, military reform, and also the National Security Commission. The "deepening reforms" leading group was said to be encroaching on the affairs in the economic realm normally handled by the premier, and was seen as having the effect of reducing Li's institutional power. Li nevertheless appeared in official press releases as Xi's foremost lieutenant, being named Vice Chairman of the National Security Commission, in addition to becoming the deputy leader of leading groups on "deepening reforms", internet security, and the economy and finance. After the announcement of comprehensive reforms at the third plenum in 2013, Li became a leading figure of the government's reform implementation efforts. The third plenum called for market forces to play a "decisive" role in the allocation of resources, ostensibly looking to decrease government regulation on the market.

In December 2013, he visited Tianjin, where he called on young people to contribute to innovation and entrepreneurialism. In March 2014, at the annual government work report given by the premier to the NPC, Li said fiscal and financial reforms would eventually allow China to cut its dependence on fixed asset investment. In April 2014, Li visited Chongqing, the first by a state leader to the city since the Party Congress in November 2012 and the downfall of party secretary Bo Xilai. In July 2014, Li said that local governments were still ineffective at following the central government's reform directives, and that some governments meddle in affairs they shouldn't be involved in, and some don't pay attention to things they should be doing. Li emphasized that the success of reforms came down to "execution and implementation", and criticized local governments for failing to act in support of reforms. In October 2014, Li held a meeting of the State Council, where he pledged major investment projects.

In March 2015, Li told the NPC in his annual work report that China would take "painful reforms". He later held a State Council meeting, where he encouraged officials to give explanations to the public on social issues. He also proposed Internet Plus and urged telecoms companies to cut prices and increase their speeds and announced investment infrastructure improvements for this goal. In April 2015, he addressed officials and state-owned enterprise executives, where he called on companies to become more competitive. He then visited Jilin, and later visited the Industrial and Commercial Bank of China and the China Development Bank in April 2015, where he called on banks to support the real economy. He also visited the Fujian Free-Trade Zone in the same month, where he called for a cut on borrowing costs. In May 2015, Li initiated the Made in China 2025 strategic plan. In March 2016, Li attended the Boao Forum for Asia, where he said China would stabilize the property market and called on Asian countries to reject trade protectionism. In July 2016, Li told provincial officials to cut red tape and increase private investment. In October 2016, he visited Macau, where he praised the city as a "treasured lotus land, a beautiful and special place". In November 2017, Li said China must improve intellectual property rights. In January 2018, Li held a meeting with economic experts and entrepreneurs, where he called for reform and innovation. In March 2018, Li's government work report said China would continue fighting against financial sector risks. In July 2018, Li visited the Tibet Autonomous Region, the first trip to the region by a Chinese premier in decades. In November 2018, Li told a meeting of the State Council that loans to small and medium enterprises should not be "wilfully withdrawn".

In February 2019, after the People's Bank of China announced loans a record high, Li warned of "new potential risks". In April 2019, Li cut value-added tax, consumption tax and import duties to boost the economy. In May 2019, Li attended chaired the national conference on employment, where he called on officials to make job creation their top priority. In September 2019, Li attended a scientific seminar, where he invoked Isaac Newton and called on Chinese scientists to be given "more freedom to explore without fear". In November 2019, Li attended a 1+6 Roundtable with the leaders of institutions including the leaders of International Monetary Fund, World Bank and World Trade Organization, where he said China agreed "not to use all-out stimulus". In April 2020, Li announced during an executive meeting of the State Council that China would build 46 new integrated pilot zones for cross-border e-commerce, in addition to the already 59 existing ones. In May 2020, during the annual government work report, Li announced plans to delay loan repayments and interest payments, and increase bank loans. During the press conference of the NPC session, Li citing the National Bureau of Statistics (NBS) said that China still had 600 million people living with less than 1000 yuan ($140) a month, although an article from The Economist said that the methodology NBS used was flawed, stating that the figure took the combined income, which was then equally divided.

In June 2020, Li visited street vendors in Yantai, Shandong, where he described the vendor economy as the "fire" or China's economy. Afterwards, Beijing Daily published an editorial that said "Roaming vendors and roadside stalls will put visible pressure on urban management, the environment, hygiene and traffic." In August 2020, during a meeting of the State Council, Li urged local governments to allocate central government support to businesses and households. In October 2020, Li attended an innovation forum in Shanghai via video link, where he said China would increase "engagement in the global innovation network". In a video meeting with officials from five provinces in November 2020, Li called on officials to "tell the truth" about economic circumstances. He wrote an article in People's Daily in the same month, where he said China's economy faced "great pressure". In January 2021, Li held a meeting of the State Council, where he ordered ministries to bring forward measures to address existing problems in the economy. In March 2021, he announced China would increase the number of "inclusive" loans offered to micro and small businesses. In April 2021, during a State Council meeting, Li said the economy faced "new uncertainties". In the same month, he attended the annual national conference on clean governance where he said China's economy is facing challenges from government red tape and low efficiency. In June 2021, Li chaired a meeting of the State Council, which proposed changes to the Population and Family Planning Law to boost the birthrate. In August 2021, Li held a State Council meeting to approve of a plan to revitalize northeast China. In October 2021, held a meeting of the National Energy Commission to address power shortages. In the same month, he attended the Canton Fair in Guangzhou, where he said China has "adequate tools in our toolbox to cope with such challenges, including the energy and electricity supply strains". In November 2021, during a meeting with the State Administration for Market Regulation, Li said China needs to lower fees and taxes for businesses, especially small and medium-sized enterprises. He also held a meeting with 10 local government heads, where he urged them to prioritize small businesses.

In March 2022, Li announced China would introduce a digital version of the national identification card. In April 2022, he attended a symposium with multiple provincial leaders in Jiangxi, saying China must strengthen the "sense of urgency". In May 2022, Li told a teleconference of provincial leaders that the employment situation was "complicated and grim", urging them to take more action. In the same month, he visited Yunnan, where he promised "resolute efforts" to crackdown on electricity cuts. he held a video conference where he spoke to more than 100,000 government cadres, where he warned about the challenges facing the economy. In June 2022, Li held a symposium at the Ministry of Transport, talking about the importance of transport in the market economy. He also visited Gaobeidian and Zhuozhou, Hebei, in the same month, saying "China’s ample grain supply is vital to stabilize consumer prices". In July 2022, at a State Council meeting, Li called for new infrastructure projects to boost the economy. In the same month, he attended a symposium with local officials in Fujian, where he called on Shanghai, Guangdong, Jiangsu, Zhejiang and Fujian to stabilize production and employment. He later visited the Ministry of Civil Affairs and the Ministry of Human Resources and Social Security, later holding a seminar on employment problems and economic development. In August 2022, he visited Shenzhen, where he met in person with leaders from Guangdong and via video link with provincial leaders from Jiangsu, Zhejiang, Shandong, Henan and Sichuan. To stabilize the economy, Li also sent 16 provincial inspection teams in August. In September 2022, he held a special meeting of the State Council to "introduce policies and measures to boost consumption and investment".

==== Economy ====
Li was a firm believer in the use of robust economic data to aid in government decision making. When Li initially entered office, China was facing structural problems inherited from the previous administration, such as an abundance of non-performing loans from many of the giant infrastructure projects the country had embarked on after the 2008 financial crisis, was overloaded with crushing debt, lower than expected revenues, and the increasingly large wealth gap. Under these circumstances, Li was said to have responded with what became known as "Likonomics", a term coined by economists at the investment bank Barclays Capital. Likonomics consisted of a three-prong approach that included the across-the-board reduction of debt, an end to massive stimulus practices of the Wen Jiabao government, and structural reforms. However, by 2014, global economic pressures and a decrease in demand of Chinese exports led to lower than expected economic growth rates. Year-on-year GDP growth amounted to less than 7.5% for the first time since 1989. Li's government then responded with tax cuts for small businesses, renovation projects of poor urban areas, and another round of rail construction, particularly focused on the country's interior.

Li emphasized urbanization as a key driver of economic growth during his tenure. Li encouraged the policy of mass entrepreneurship and innovation, which sought to explore new avenues of economic growth, such as e-commerce, at a time when traditional models appeared to lose momentum. He also promoted tax cuts; from 2015 to 2020, the government cut 7.6 trillion yuan of taxes and fees, decreasing the ratio of government tax revenues to GDP down by 3 percent to 15.2 percent.

==== Bureaucracy ====
Li was critical of unnecessary government bureaucracy, particularly at the grassroots level. He stated his belief that many lower-level officials fail to provide services to the public in an effective manner. Regarding his disdain for the matter, Li's many quotable anecdotes have become viral. In May 2015, Li referred to a case in which a citizen filling out a form to travel overseas (normal in the PRC) had to write down an emergency contact (the citizen put down their mother as the contact), and the government official overseeing the matter asked the citizen to provide a notarized document to "prove your mom is your mom." Li called this incident "absolutely preposterous". In another case, he referred to a grassroots civil servant who asked for proof that a one-year old does not have a criminal record in order to deliver a government service. In yet another case, Li referred to a senior citizen applying for welfare benefits being forced by government employees to provide proof that "they are still alive." Regarding the latter two incidents, Li said, "this is not a joke, it's all real!"

==== COVID-19 ====
From January 2020, Li was in charge of the Chinese government's response to the COVID-19 pandemic as the head of the Central Leading Group on Responding to the Novel Coronavirus Disease Outbreak. On 27 January, Li visited Wuhan, the original epicenter of the pandemic, to direct outbreak prevention work. In March 2020, Li said China should focus on the economy and employment as it had brought COVID-19 under control. In April 2020, Li announced that due to the pandemic, China would extend unemployment benefits and other forms of emergency aid to migrant workers. The State Council announced state-funded infrastructure projects would use up to 15 percent of investment for a project, up from 10 percent. In January 2021, during a State Council meeting, Li said transparency was essential and warned against covering up outbreaks. In March 2022, he defended China's zero-COVID policy, while pledging to follow a more "scientific and targeted" approach.

=== Foreign affairs ===
In April 2013, during a meeting with US Secretary of State John Kerry, Li said that "Provocations on the Korean Peninsula will harm the interests of all sides". He made his first foreign visit to India on 18 May 2013 in a bid to resolve border disputes and to stimulate economic relations. He said the choice of India as the first international visit highlights Chinese importance in its relations with the country. Li also visited Switzerland and Germany on his first Europe trip, and met with the two countries' leaders. During his visit to Pakistan, Li met with the country's top leadership and expressed his views: "As Pakistan's closest friend and brother, we would like to provide as much assistance as we can for the Pakistani side". In June 2014, while visiting the United Kingdom, Li urged Scotland, which would hold an independence vote later that year, to remain part of the UK. During prime minister Narendra Modi's state visit to China in 2015, Li and Modi took a selfie together at the Temple of Heaven in Beijing.

United States lieutenant general H. R. McMaster wrote of Li that, "If anyone in the American group had any doubts about China's view of its relationship with the United States, Li's monologue would have removed them. He began with the observation that China, having already developed its industrial and technological base, no longer needed the United States."

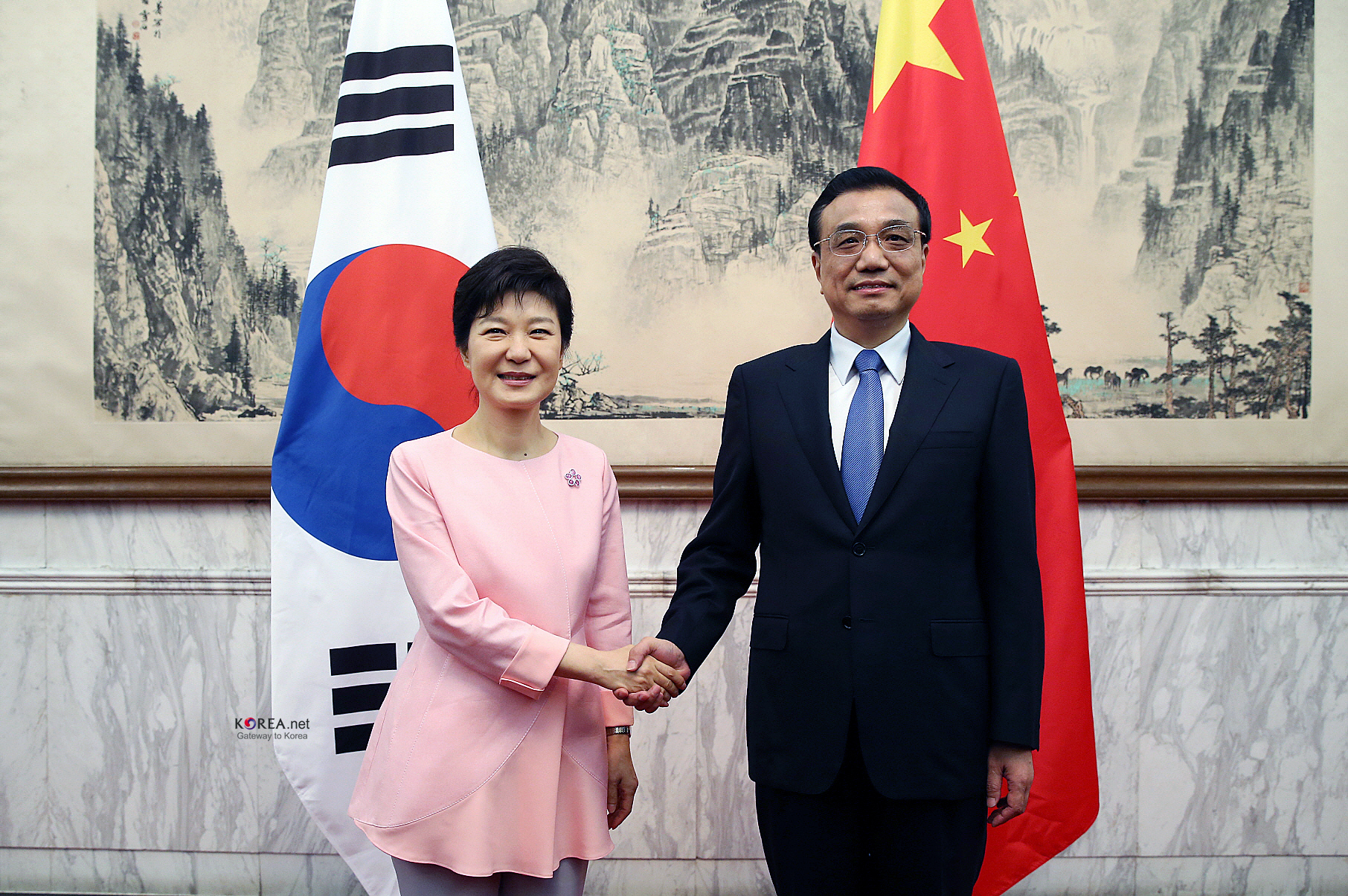
June 2013, Li meets the South Korean president Park Geun-hye.

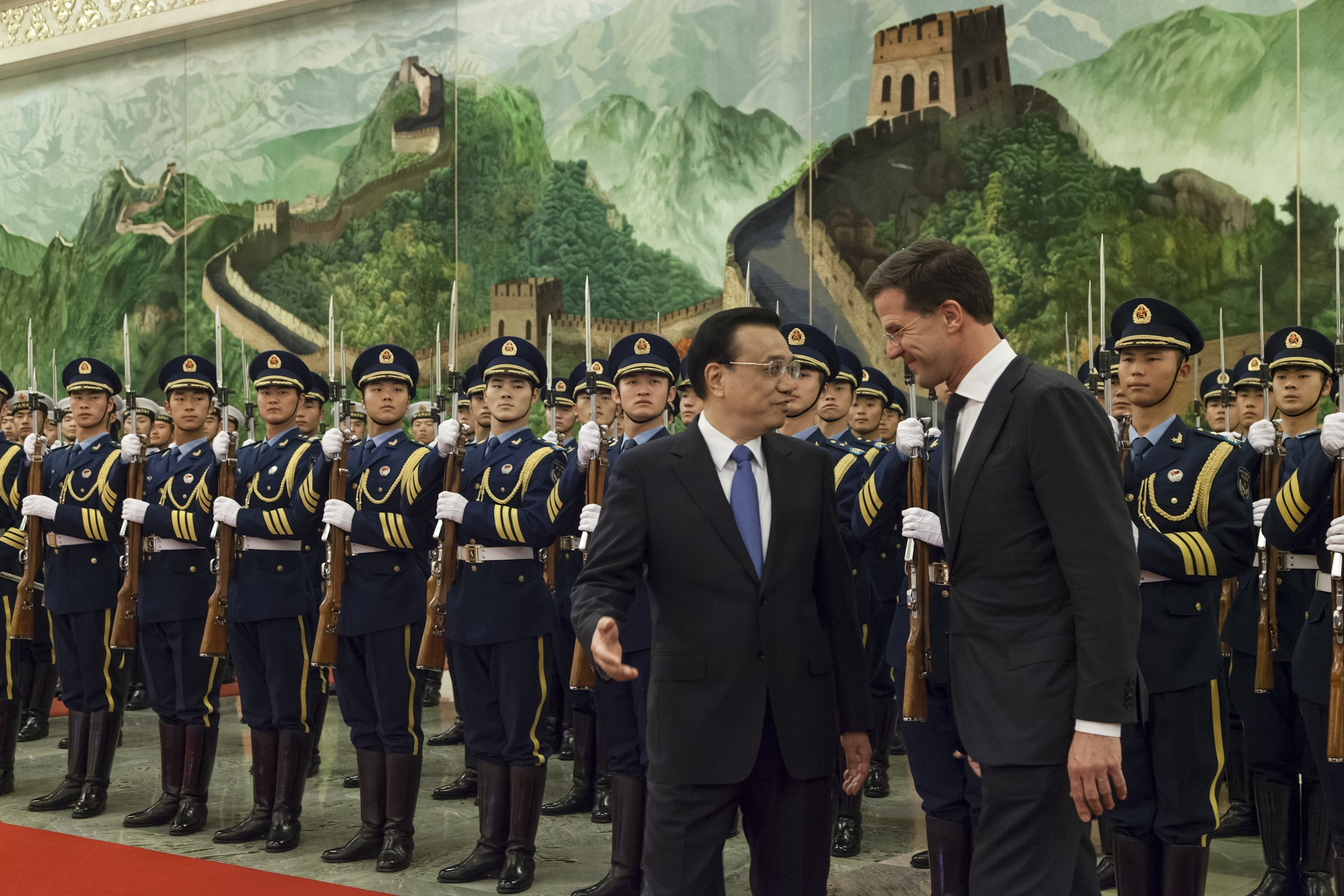
December 2013, Li meets the Dutch prime minister Mark Rutte.

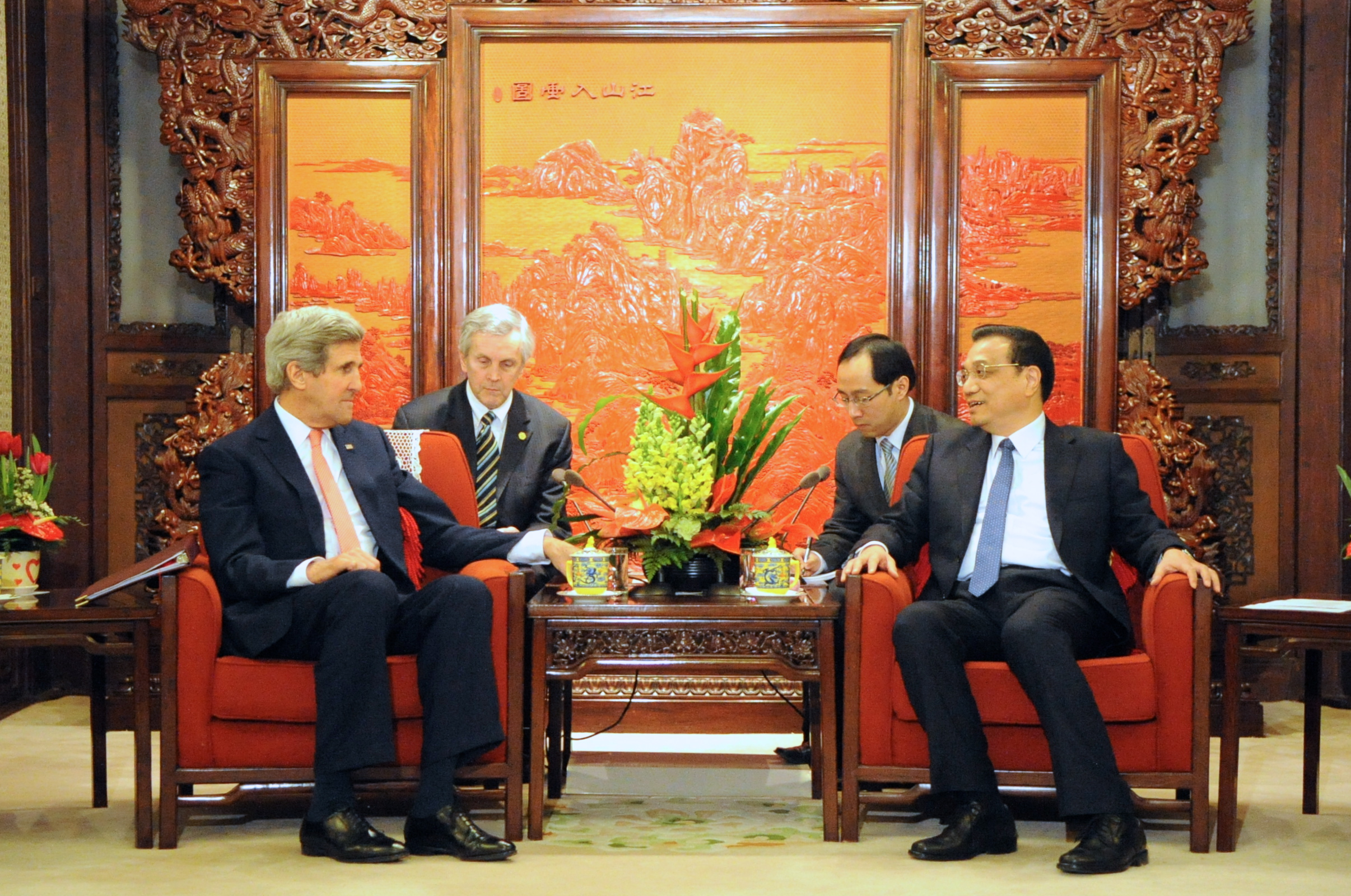
February 2014, Li meets the United States Secretary of State John Kerry.

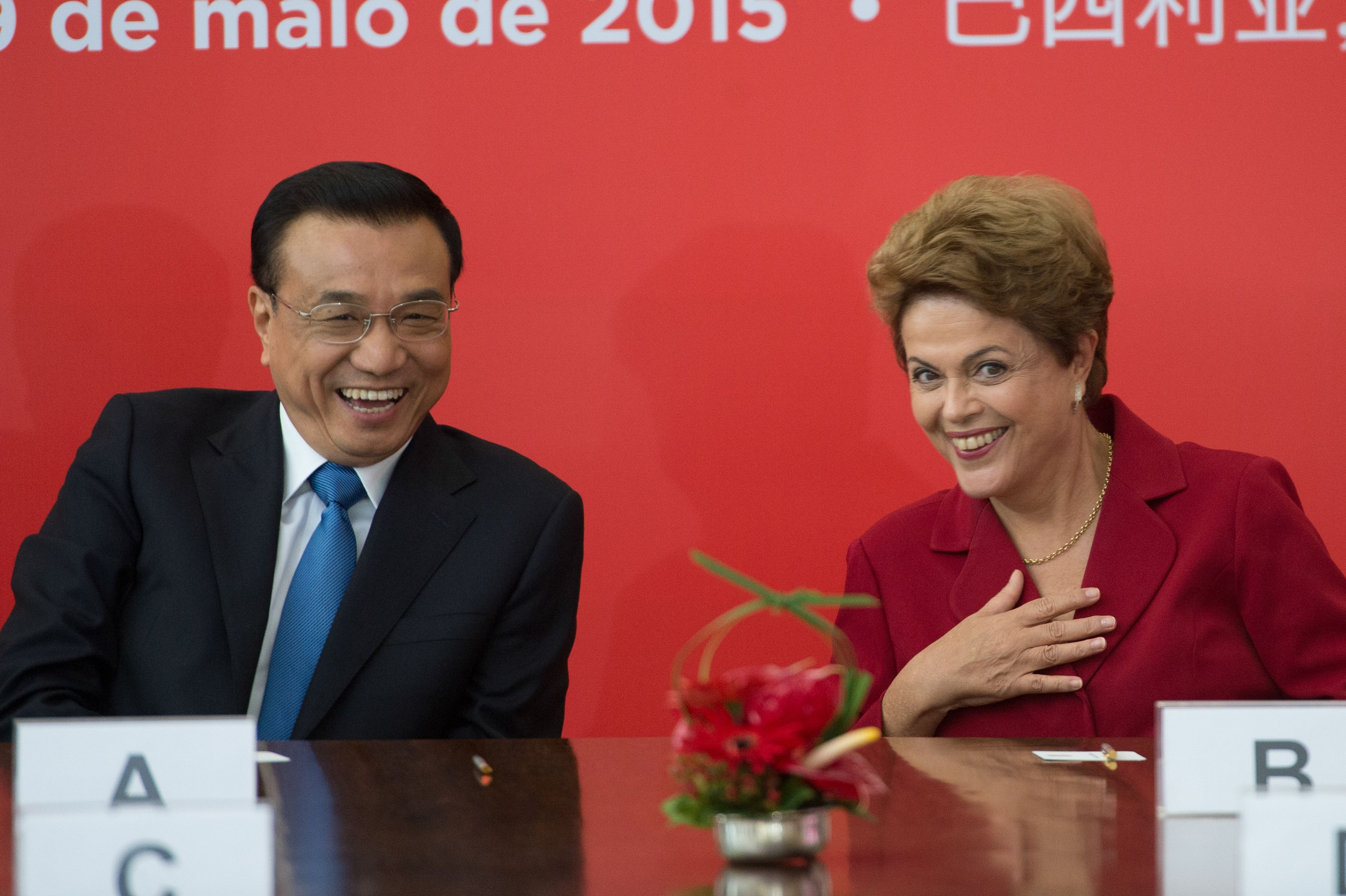
May 2015, Li meets the Brazilian president Dilma Rousseff.

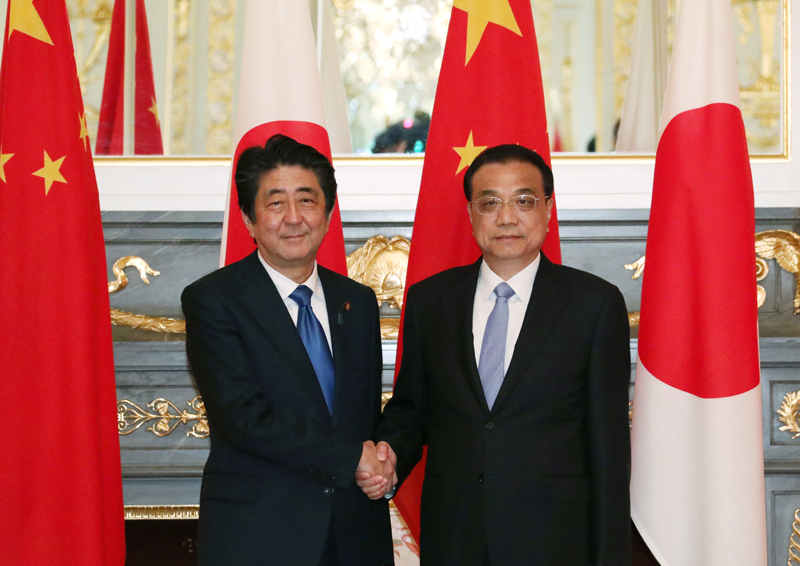
May 2018, Li meets the Japanese prime minister Shinzo Abe.

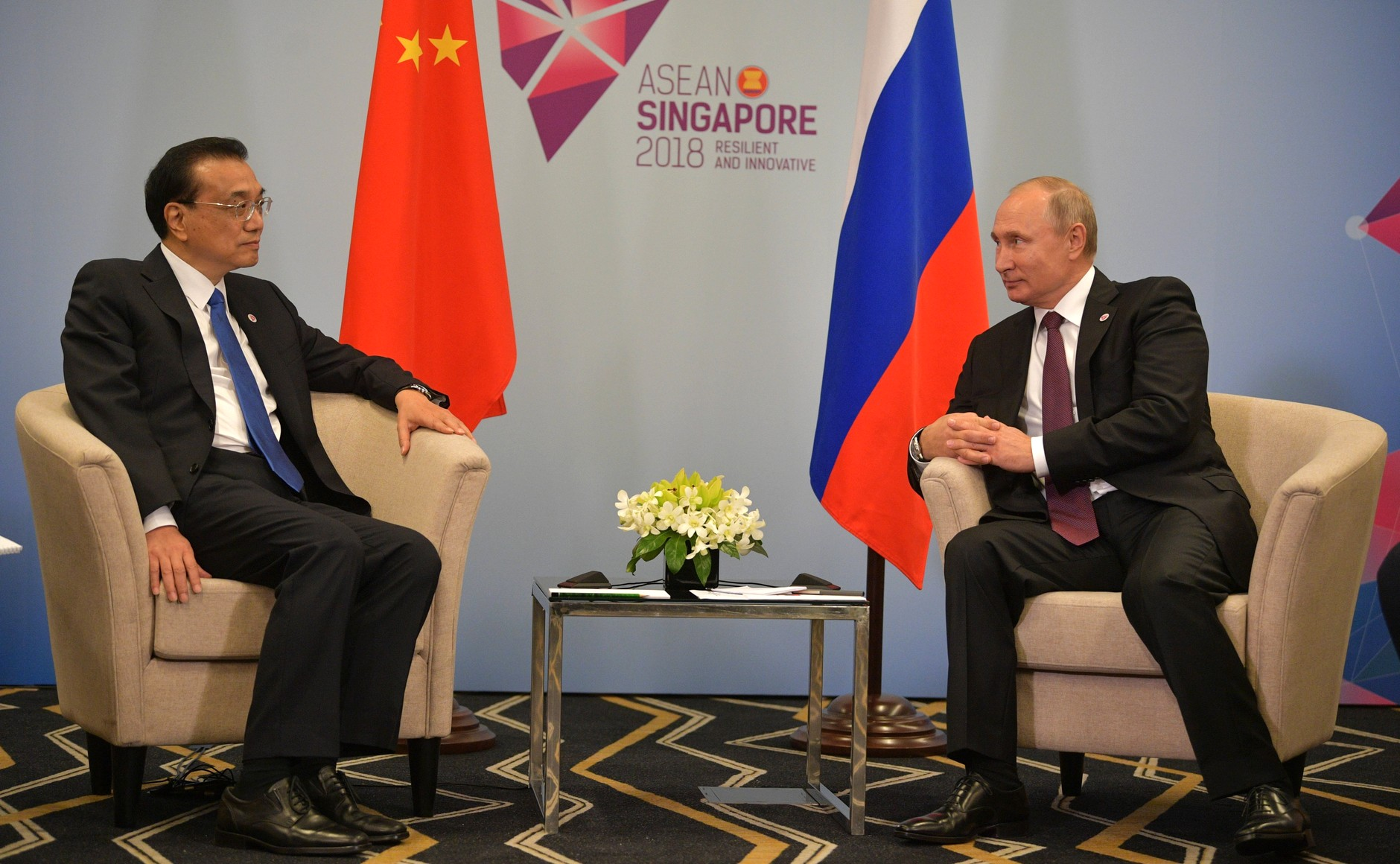
November 2018, Li meets the Russian president Vladimir Putin.

== Post-premiership (2023) ==
On 11 March 2022, Li confirmed that he would be stepping down as premier of China upon the expiry of his second term in March 2023. However, there was speculation that he might continue serving as Politburo Standing Committee member in another post, such as the chairman of the National People's Congress Standing Committee, which were ultimately without foundation. During the 20th National Congress of the Chinese Communist Party in October 2022, Li stepped down from the Central Committee. Li's term officially ended on 11 March 2023, and he was succeeded by Li Qiang, a close ally of Xi. Although it was excluded from the official transcript, his farewell speech included the remark: "While people work, heaven watches. It looks like that heaven has eyes."

After Li stepped down as Premier in March 2023, he visited Mogao Caves in Gansu in August 2023, which was his first public appearance after retirement and last public appearance before his death.

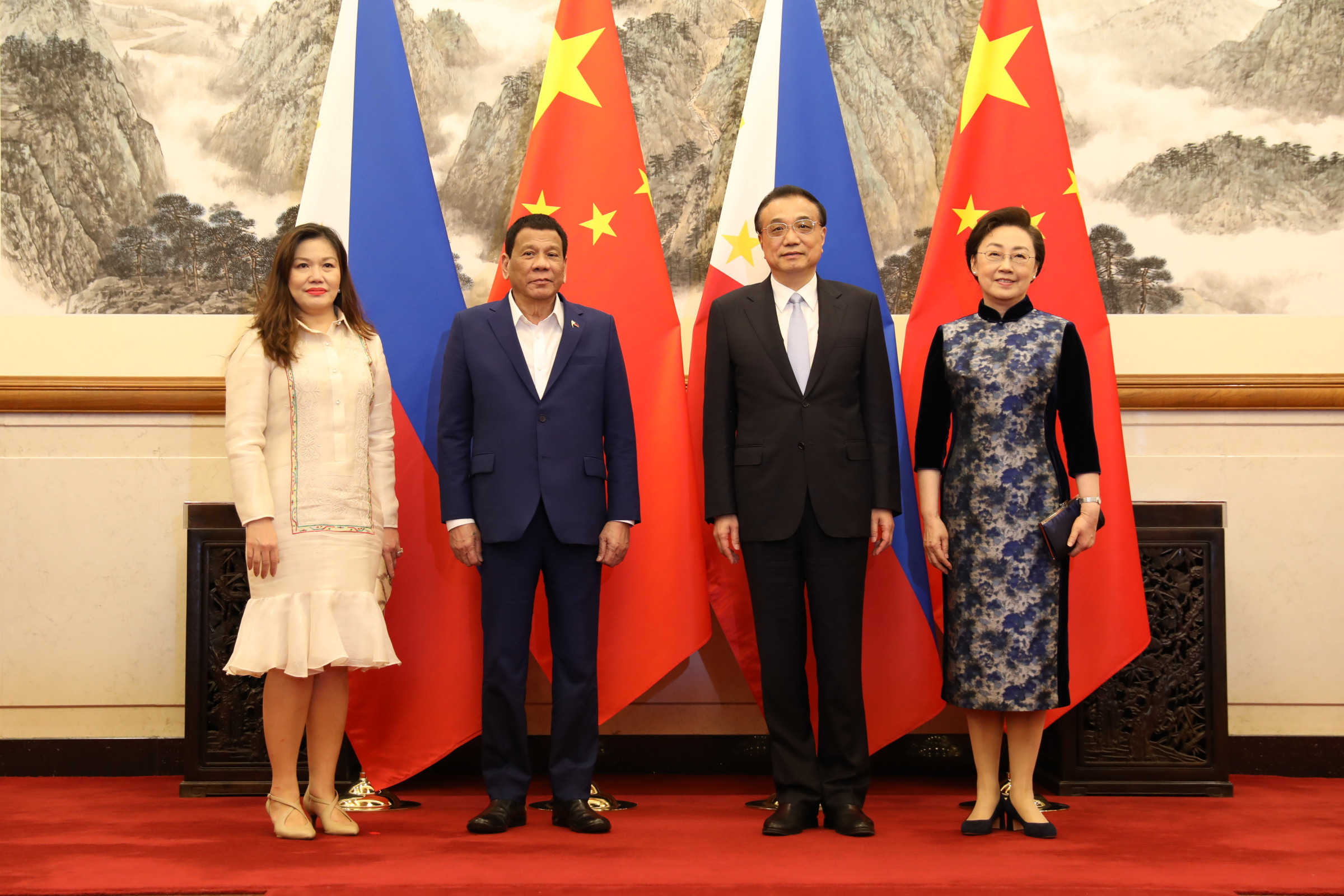
Li and his wife (far right) with Filipino president Rodrigo Duterte in 2019

== Death ==
Li died at Shuguang Hospital Affiliated to the Shanghai University of Traditional Chinese Medicine (上海中医药大学附属曙光医院) in Pudong at 00:10 CST on 27 October 2023 at the age of 68 after a heart attack the previous day. The South China Morning Post (SCMP) reported that the heart attack occurred as he swam at Shanghai's Dongjiao State Guest Hotel. The Standard reported that long-term use of anti-rejection drugs following a liver transplant were a contributing factor. SCMP reported that he had also undergone coronary artery bypass surgery.

Li's remains were flown to Beijing on 27 October. On 2 November, a memorial ceremony was held at the Babaoshan Revolutionary Cemetery and he was cremated. Attendees of the ceremony included Xi Jinping, his wife Peng Liyuan, Premier Li Qiang, all other members of the 20th Politburo Standing Committee, and Vice President Han Zheng. According to state media, former leader Hu Jintao sent flowers and did not attend. National flags were flown at half-mast at Chinese government buildings, diplomatic missions, and in Hong Kong and Macau.

On 3 July 2025, the Institute of Party History and Literature published an article in the People's Daily marking Li's 70th birth anniversary, saying Li "dedicated all his energy to the cause of the party and the state, and made significant contributions to it" and was an "outstanding member of the party, time-tested loyal communist fighter, outstanding revolutionary and politician, and exemplary leader", calling him "deeply devoted to the people".

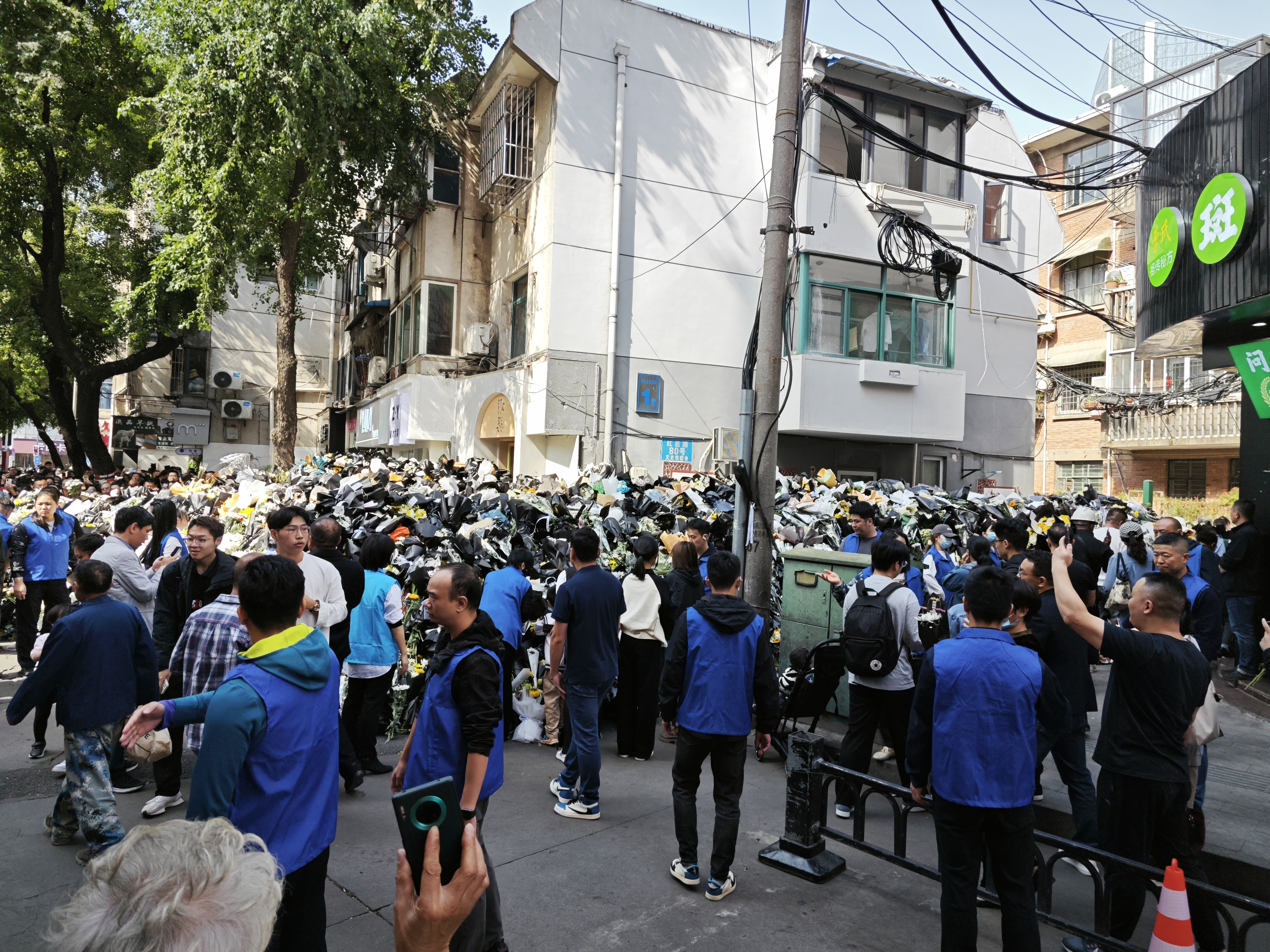
Mourners leaving flowers near Li's childhood residence in Luyang District, Hefei.

== Personal life ==
Li was married to Cheng Hong, a professor in English Language and Literature (especially American Naturalism) at the Capital University of Economics and Business in Beijing. His father-in-law was once the deputy secretary of the Communist Youth League Central Committee. Alongside Mandarin, he also spoke conversational English.

Li was ranked 14th of the 2013 Forbes list of the World's Most Powerful People, after taking the office of Chinese premier.

== Political views ==
Li was generally regarded as advocating economic reform and liberalization. He was described as representing the less ideological and more pragmatic and technocratic side of China's leadership. In August 2022, Li gave a speech in Shenzhen praising Deng Xiaoping and his economic reforms, which was later censored by the Chinese government. Wang Juntao, a Chinese dissident and former colleague of Li during his studies at the Peking University, said that Li was "very interested" in political reform.

=== Economy ===
In February 2012, Li wrote an article in Qiushi, Li wrote that too little of China's economy was driven by consumption, and that China should expand the share of middle-income earners by finding ways for low-income people to earn more, including through wage rises, expanding the social security network, business incentives, subsidizing housing and giving more affordable medical care.

== Awards and honors ==
- Gold Medal of the Hellenic Parliament (Greece, 2014)
- Nishan-e-Pakistan (Pakistan, 2013)

== Publications ==
- Li, Yining; Meng, Xiaosu; Li, Yuanchao; Li, Keqiang (December 2018). The Strategic Choice for China's Prosperity. Translated by Shi, Guangjun; Jiang, Hongxing (English ed.). Singapore: South Ocean Publishing House.

== See also ==
- Tuanpai

== Explanatory notes ==
Government offices
| Preceded by Wen Jiabao | Premier of the State Council; 2013–2023 | Succeeded by Li Qiang |
| Preceded by Wen Jiabao | Director of the National Defense Mobilization Commission; 2013–2023 | Succeeded by Li Qiang |
| Preceded by Wen Jiabao | Director of the National Energy Commission; 2013–2023 | Succeeded by Li Qiang |
| Preceded by Wen Jiabao | Director of the Three Gorges Project Committee; 2008–2013 | Succeeded by Zhang Gaoli |
| Preceded by Wen Jiabao | Director of the South–North Water Transfer Project Committee; 2008–2013 | Succeeded by Zhang Gaoli |
| Preceded by Wu Yi; Acting | First-ranked Vice-Premier of the State Council; 2008–2013 | Succeeded by Zhang Gaoli |
| Preceded by Ma Zhongchen | Governor of Henan; 1998–2003 | Succeeded by Li Chengyu |
Assembly seats
| Preceded by Ren Keli | Chairperson of the People's Congress of Henan Province; 2003–2005 | Succeeded by Xu Guangchun |
| Preceded by Wen Shizhen | Chairperson of the People's Congress of Liaoning Province; 2005–2007 | Succeeded by Zhang Xilin |
Party political offices
| Preceded by Song Defu | First Secretary of the Communist Youth League of China; 1993–1998 | Succeeded by Zhou Qiang |
| Preceded by Chen Kuiyuan | Provincial Committee Secretary of Henan; 2002–2004 | Succeeded by Xu Guangchun |
| Preceded by Wen Shizhen | Provincial Committee Secretary of Liaoning; 2004–2007 | Succeeded by Zhang Wenyue |
| Preceded by Wen Jiabao | Director of the Central Institutional Organization Commission; 2013–2023 | Succeeded by Li Qiang |
| New title | Deputy Leader of the Central Leading Group for Comprehensively Deepening Reforms; 2014–2023 | Succeeded by Li Qiang |
| New title | Vice Chairman of the National Security Commission; 2014–2023 | Succeeded by Li Qiang |
Order of precedence
| Preceded by Xi Jinping as Vice President of China | Rank of the Chinese Communist Party; 17th Politburo Standing Committee | Succeeded by He Guoqiang as Secretary of the Central Commission for Discipline Inspection |
| Preceded by Xi Jinping as CCP General Secretary and PRC President | Rank of the Chinese Communist Party; 18th Politburo Standing Committee | Succeeded by Zhang Dejiang as Chairman of the Standing Committee of the National People's Congress |
