= Li Yining =

Chinese economist (1930–2023)

- 厉以宁
- Born: 22 November 1930; Nanjing, Jiangsu, China
- Died: 27 February 2023 (aged 92); Beijing, China
- Education: Peking University
- Spouse: He Yuchun (何玉春) (m. 1958)
- Awards: Fukuoka Asian Culture Prize (2004); Sun Yefang Economics Prize
- Scientific career
- Fields: Economics
- Workplaces: Peking University Guanghua School of Management
- Notable students: Li Keqiang; Li Yuanchao; Lu Hao

Li Yining (Chinese: 厉以宁; pinyin: Lì Yǐníng; 22 November 1930 – 27 February 2023) was a Chinese economist. He voiced for the privatization of state-owned companies, and his advocacy led to the reestablishment of China's stock exchanges in 1990. For this reason, he was nicknamed "Li Gufen" ('Stock Li'), while Wu Jinglian is known as Wu Shichang ('Market Wu'). Along with Yu Guangyuan and Wu Jinglian, Li was credited with providing the theoretical basis for the reform and opening up that has propelled China's economic growth.

Li was a long-time professor at Peking University and founding dean of the Guanghua School of Management. Amongst his former students were Chinese Premier Li Keqiang and Vice President Li Yuanchao. In 2004, Li Yining was awarded the Fukuoka Asian Culture Prize of Japan.

Li died in Beijing in February 2023, at age 92.

== Early life ==
Li Yining was born 22 November 1930 in Nanjing, Jiangsu province, but is considered a native of his ancestral home Yizheng by Chinese convention. He was raised in Shanghai and Hunan province. In 1951, he entered the Economics Department of Peking University, where he studied under prominent economists such as Chen Daisun (陈岱孙) and Luo Zhiru (罗志如), and was hired as a faculty member after graduating in 1955. However, only two years later he was labeled as a "rightist" when Mao Zedong launched the Anti-Rightist Movement, and during the Cultural Revolution (1966–76) he was again persecuted for his ideas and banished to a rural village where he performed manual labour for six years.

== Reform era ==
After his political rehabilitation in 1978, Li Yining became a bold proponent of Deng Xiaoping's fledgling policy of economic reform. He insisted that the key first step of reform should be to privatize state-owned companies by introducing a shareholding system. However, the prevailing opinion among the reformers at the time was to first loosen price control. Li Yining unsuccessfully argued that ownership reform would initiate accountability for profits or losses and create a driving force for development, whereas price reform would only create a competitive environment for companies. For this theory he became known as "Mr. Stock Market Li". Li's vocal advocacy for the reform of state ownership, the bedrock of China's socialism, was supported by Yu Guangyuan (于光远) and Dong Furen (董辅礽), but met strong resistance from conservatives and exposed himself to significant political risk. In 1983 and 1984, his ideas were attacked as spiritual pollution and he could not have his articles published; in early 1987 he was again criticized in a campaign against "bourgeois liberalization".

Li Yining's theory was vindicated in 1988, when premature price liberalization resulted in severe inflation and social instability that endangered the entire reform process. In the early 1990s, the shareholding system that Li had been advocating was implemented by the central government of China. Shanghai Stock Exchange and Shenzhen Stock Exchange were established in 1990, and many state-owned companies have since become publicly traded. Li's economic theory is believed to be an important contribution to China's stunning economic growth that ensued. In 2004 Li was awarded the Academic Prize of the Fukuoka Asian Culture Prize by the Japanese city of Fukuoka, and in 2009 he was awarded a prize for innovation in economic theory by the Chinese government.

== Academics ==
Li Yining has spent his entire academic career at his alma mater Peking University. He formerly served as the dean of the Guanghua School of Management, the university's business school, and later was professor and dean emeritus of the school. In the late 1980s and early 1990s, he was the doctoral advisor of Li Keqiang and the advisor for the master thesis of Li Yuanchao. They co-authored the book Strategic Choices for Prosperity (走向繁荣的战略选择). In 2013 Li Keqiang became the Premier of China and Li Yuanchao became the Vice President. His other students include Lu Hao, Governor of Heilongjiang province and a former Vice Mayor of Beijing, Meng Xiaosu, CEO of China Real Estate Development Group, and Gong Fangxiong, CEO of JPMorgan Chase Bank China Region.

== Major publications ==
- Economics of Education, 1984
- System, Objective, and Human: Challenges Faced by Economics, 1986
- Political Economy of Socialism, 1986
- Management of the National Economy, 1988 (revised 1998)
- Ideas on China's Economic Reform, 1989
- Disequilibrium of Chinese Economy, 1990 (reprinted 1998)
- China's Economic Reform and Share-holding System, 1992
- Share-holding System and Modern Market Economy, 1994
- Development Theory of Transformation, 1996
- Transcending Market and Transcending Government: The Role of Moral Power in Economy, 1999
- The Origin of Capitalism: Comparative Studies of Economic History, 2003
- Li Yining's Collection of Lectures at Peking University, 2003
- The Strategic Choice for China's Prosperity (English version), 2018, with Meng Xiaosu, Li Yuanchao and Li Keqiang. Translated from Chinese by Shi Guangjun and Jiang Hongxing. ISBN 9789811181504.

Source: Fukuoka Prize.
