= Mass entrepreneurship and innovation =

Chinese government policy and slogan

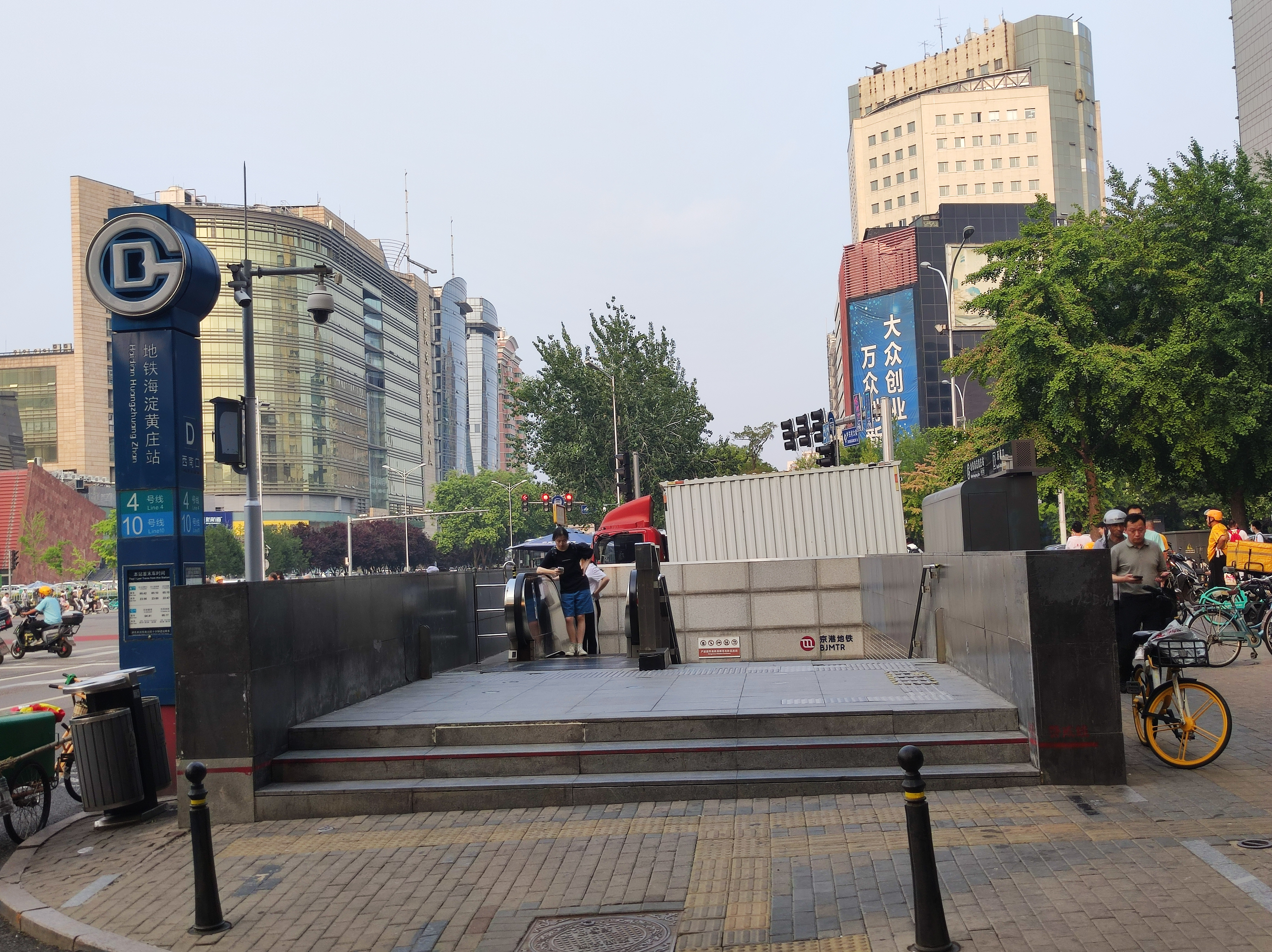
The entrance/exit of Haidian Huangzhuang station on Beijing Subway Lines 4 and 10, with the slogan "Mass Entrepreneurship and Innovation" visible in the background, July 2024

Mass entrepreneurship and innovation, abbreviated in Chinese as shuangchuang (Chinese: 雙創), is an innovation and entrepreneurship policy promoted by the government of the People's Republic of China since 2015. The State Council issued the Guiding Opinions on Supporting Platforms for Mass Entrepreneurship and Innovation on 26 September 2015, stating that in the context of the growth of the global sharing economy and the development of Internet innovation, it is necessary to promote a systematic policy of crowdsourcing, crowdfunding, crowd support and crowd-raising. Premier Li Keqiang, who led the policy, was praised by the Chinese state media as "Maker Li Keqiang" for promoting "mass entrepreneurship and innovation". Various provincial and municipal governments have launched policies to respond to "mass entrepreneurship and innovation" and build maker spaces, which to some extent has led to an oversupply of maker spaces and incubators.

== History ==
On 10 September 2014, Tianjin hosted the World Economic Forum Annual Meeting of the New Champions 2014. Following convention, Chinese Premier Li Keqiang, who attended the opening ceremony, said in his speech: "We should take advantage of the 'east wind' of reform and innovation to promote the scientific development of China's economy, and set off a new wave of 'mass entrepreneurship' and 'grassroots entrepreneurship' on the 9.6 million square kilometers of land, forming a new situation of 'mass innovation' and 'innovation by everyone'". This was the first time that Li Keqiang proposed the concept of "mass entrepreneurship and mass innovation".

On 20 November 2014, at the first World Internet Conference held in Hangzhou, Li Keqiang pointed out that the Internet is a new tool for mass entrepreneurship and innovation, and the Chinese government attaches great importance to and strongly supports the development of the Internet.

In 2015, at the 12th National People's Congress and the Chinese People's Political Consultative Conference, Li Keqiang proposed to make "mass entrepreneurship and innovation" one of the "dual engines" driving China's economy forward, especially encouraging scientific and technological personnel and college students to start businesses. The Wall Street Journal noted that Li Keqiang mentioned innovation 63 times in his government work report and analyzed that this move was a short-term remedy for the economic slowdown in the context of the sluggish traditional manufacturing and export industries. After the NPC and CPPCC, the enthusiasm for innovation and entrepreneurship in mainland China rose even higher.

On 11 June, the State Council officially issued the "Opinions on Several Policy Measures to Vigorously Promote Mass Entrepreneurship and Innovation". On 26 September, the State Council issued the "Guiding Opinions of the State Council on Accelerating the Construction of Support Platforms for Mass Entrepreneurship and Innovation". On 13 October, Li Pumin, Secretary-General of the National Development and Reform Commission, said that starting in 2015, the "National Mass Entrepreneurship and Innovation Week" will be held every October.

During the 2016 National People's Congress and Chinese People's Political Consultative Conference sessions, the Central Committee of the China Association for Promoting Democracy submitted a proposal pointing out that within a short period of one year after the "mass entrepreneurship and innovation" policy was proposed, the number of "makerspaces" in various places increased dramatically. Behind the bustling activity, there were also risks and crises, such as wasting financial investment and social resources, undermining public confidence in "mass entrepreneurship and innovation," and guiding the sustainable and healthy development of "makerspaces" became an urgent task. However, this proposal did not receive any feedback.

== Co-working space ==
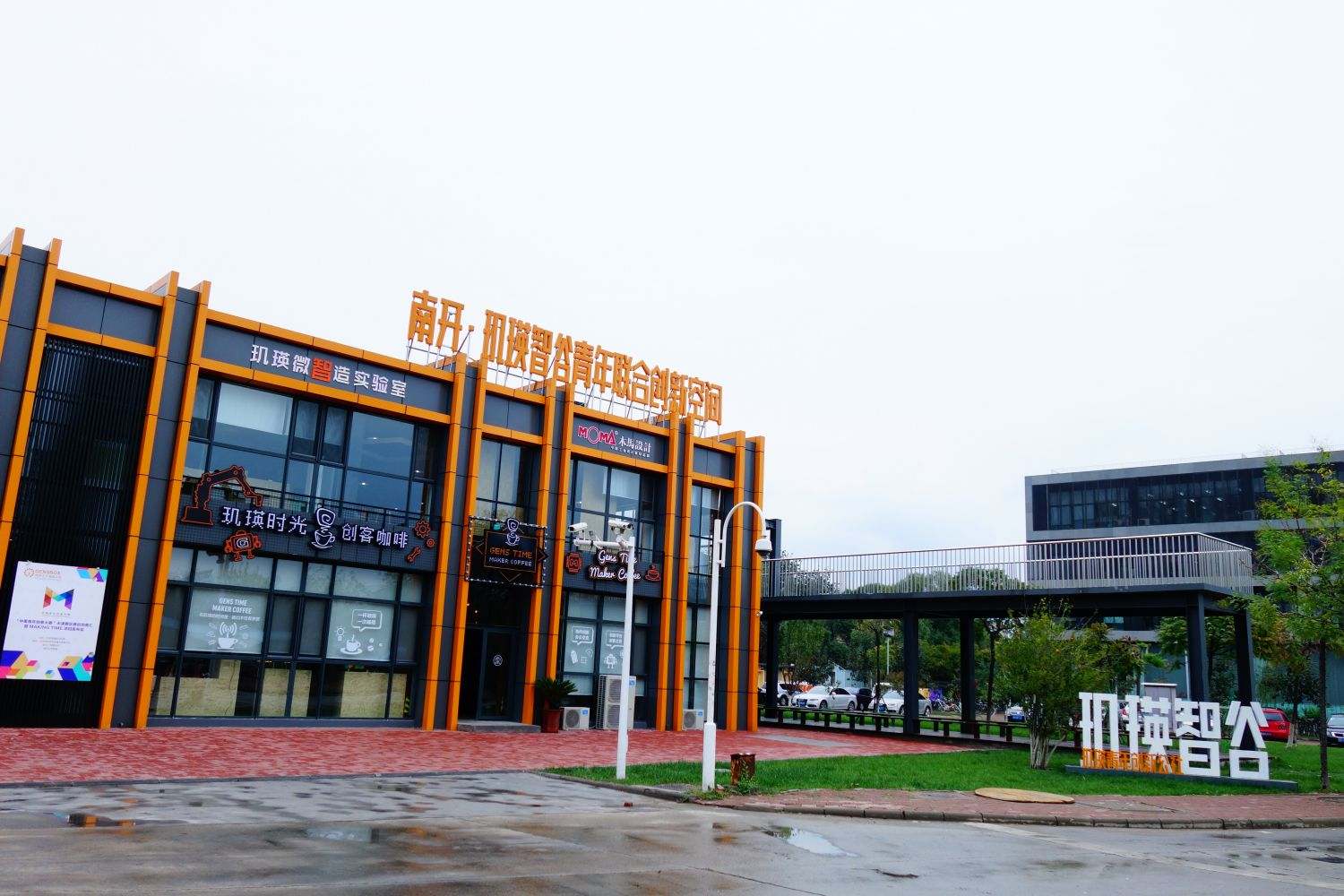
Hackerspaces as a platform for innovation and entrepreneurship

Co-working spaces are a general term for comprehensive service platforms that are low-cost, convenient, all-encompassing, and open, and play a guiding role in the implementation of the "mass entrepreneurship and innovation" policy. Co-working spaces are considered to be the carriers for implementing the "mass entrepreneurship and innovation" policy in mainland China and the micro-ecological environment of the regional innovation system. Therefore, many local governments, such as Beijing and Tianjin, have successively issued policy documents to support the construction of co-working spaces. For example, Tianjin proposed to build 100 co-working spaces in the city, while Suzhou planned to establish 300 co-working spaces and other incubators by 2020.
