= Liu Qiao (economist) =

Chinese economist

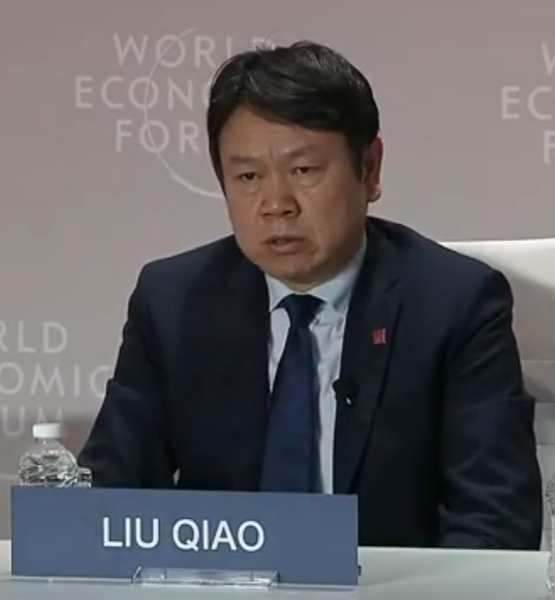
- At a WEF meeting in June 2024
- Born: c. 1970
- Education: Renmin University of China; Tsinghua University; University of California, Los Angeles
- Occupation: Academic

Liu Qiao (Chinese: 刘俏; born c. 1970) is a Chinese economist. He is the dean of the Guanghua School of Management of Peking University, where he is also a professor of finance.

== Early life ==
Liu was born circa 1970. He graduated from the Renmin University of China, where he earned a bachelor's degree in economics and mathematics in 1991. He earned a master's degree in international finance and economics from the Tsinghua University in 1994, and a PhD in economics from the University of California, Los Angeles in 2000.

== Career ==
Liu worked for McKinsey & Company from 2001 to 2003.

Liu was an assistant professor of economics at the University of Hong Kong from 2003 to 2010. He became a professor of finance at Peking University's Guanghua School of Management in 2011. He serves as its dean.

Liu serves on the boards of directors of ZH International Holdings and Hexie Health Insurance.

== Works ==
- Arner, Douglas W.; Lejot, Paul; Liu, Qiao; Park, Jae-Ha, eds. (2006). Asia's Debt Capital Markets : Prospects and Strategies for Development. New York: Milken Institute. ISBN 9780387250908. OCLC 804628313.
- Arner, Douglas W.; Lejot, Paul; Liu, Qiao (2013). Finance in Asia: Institutions, Regulation, and Policy. New York: Routledge. ISBN 9780415423199. OCLC 966059507.
